= Fisk =

Fisk may refer to:

== Places in the United States ==
- Fisk, Iowa
- Fisk, Missouri
- Fisk, Wisconsin
- Fisk University, Nashville, Tennessee
- Fisk Generating Station, a power station in Chicago, Illinois

== Other uses ==
- Fisk (surname)
- Fisk Tire Company
- Fria liberaler i Svenska kyrkan (FiSK), a nominating group in the Church of Sweden
- Fisk (TV series), a 2021 Australian TV series

== See also ==
- Fiske
- Fisker (disambiguation)
- Justice Fisk (disambiguation)
