= Fiske =

Fiske is a surname of Scandinavian origins.

According to Burke's Peerage, "The family of Fiske has long flourished in the counties of Norfolk (recorded as landowners in the Domesday Book) and Suffolk [in England], and derives from the old Norse name of Fiskr. Legend holds that they arrived with the invading forces of Olaf Tryggvason, King of Norway, at the Battle of Maldon on the Blackwater River in Essex in 991 A.D. Daniel Fisk, of Laxfield is mentioned in a document issued by King John, confirming a grant of land in Digneveton (Dennington), made by the Duke of Lorraine to the men of Laxfield 1 May 1208."

The name may refer to several people:

== In arts and entertainment ==
- Alexander Fiske-Harrison (born 1976), British writer
- Alison Fiske (1943–2020), English actress, daughter of Roger Fiske
- Anna Fiske (born 1964), Swedish illustrator
- Frank Bennett Fiske (1883–1952), American photographer
- George Fiske (1835–1918), American photographer
- Harrison Grey Fiske (1861–1942), American writer
- Irving Fiske (1908–1990), American playwright
- Lars Fiske (born 1966), Norwegian illustrator
- Minnie Maddern Fiske (1865–1932), American actress
- Reine Fiske (born 1972), Swedish musician
- Richard Fiske (1915–1944), American actor
- Robert Fiske (actor) (1889–1944), American actor
- Roger Fiske (1910–1987), English musicologist, broadcaster and author
- Willard Fiske (1831–1904), American librarian and writer

== In law and politics ==
- Bill Fiske (1905–1975), British politician
- Fiske Goodeve Fiske-Harrison (1793–1872), British judge and politician
- Robert B. Fiske (born 1930), American lawyer

== In science and academia ==
- Abigail Fiske (born 1994), British psychologist
- Alan Fiske (born 1946), American anthropologist
- Donald W. Fiske (1916–2003), American psychologist
- John Fiske (philosopher) (1842–1901), American philosopher
- Lewis R. Fiske (1825–1901), American university president
- Richard S. Fiske (1932–2025), American volcanologist
- Susan Fiske (born 1952), American psychologist
- Thomas Fiske (1864–1944), American mathematician
- Willard Fiske (1831–1904), American librarian and writer

== Places ==
- Fiske, Saskatchewan, hamlet in Saskatchewan, Canada
- Fiskdale, Massachusetts, a village of Sturbridge, Massachusetts, USA

== In other fields ==
- Amos Kidder Fiske (1842–1921), American journalist
- Billy Fiske (1911–1940), American athlete and fighter pilot
- Bradley A. Fiske (1854–1942), American admiral
- Catherine Fiske (1784-1837), American school founder
- Clive Fiske Harrison (born 1939), British banker
- Solveig Fiske (born 1952), Norwegian bishop
- Thomas W. Fiske (born 1954), American Episcopal Priest

== See also ==
- Fisk (surname)
- Fisker (disambiguation)
