= List of Spider-Man: The Animated Series characters =

This is a list of characters from the 1994 television series Spider-Man.

== Heroes and allies ==
=== Spider-Man ===
Peter Benjamin Parker (voiced by Christopher Daniel Barnes and briefly as an old man by Peter Mark Richman) is the main protagonist of the series. A one-time high school "science geek", Peter was the subject of much ridicule, especially at the hands of Flash Thompson. After his parents died in a plane crash, Peter lived with his Uncle Ben and Aunt May, who doted and worried endlessly about the reclusive boy suddenly placed in their midst. During a class field trip to see a demonstration of Neogenic radiation, carried on by Professor Farley Stillwell, a spider crawled into Stillwell's machine and became irradiated, biting Peter in the hand and granting him the proportionate abilities of a spider, including superhuman strength, durability, stamina, speed, agility, senses and a "Spider-Sense" that warned him of imminent danger.

Peter initially became Spider-Man for personal reasons, seeking the popularity that he never had at school. Constructing mechanical web-shooters in his bedroom, Parker set out to make a name for himself in show-business, making television appearances and starting a brief career as a professional wrestler.

It was after one such wrestling engagement that Peter's life changed for the worse; fame went to the idealistic Parker's head, and he refused to stop an escaping criminal, considering it "none of his business". A short time later, Parker returned home to find that his uncle Ben had been shot dead by a home invader, who had then escaped to an abandoned waterfront warehouse. Following the murderer, Parker was shocked and ashamed to discover that his uncle's death had been his fault; his uncle's killer was the same man that Parker had let escape earlier in the day.

Devastated by his own actions, Peter turned Spider-Man into a force for good, promising to protect the city and its occupants. In his civilian life, Peter got a job as a photographer at the Daily Bugle, working for J. Jonah Jameson (a man who passionately despises Spider-Man), and attending Empire State University as a college student. Spider-Man once told a little fangirl of his named Tiana about his origins (albeit not revealing his secret identity) and after she helped him defeat Dr. Octopus in a battle, he willingly revealed his identity to her - and unbeknownst to him, Madame Web had him do this because Tiana was terminally ill.

Peter would later discover that his parents were, spies for the American government, but were branded as Soviet double agents against the United States. However, he did manage to prove their innocence in story arc "Six Forgotten Warriors". During the course of the series, Peter would also marry his longtime, on-and-off love, a clone of Mary Jane Watson (unbeknownst to him until minutes before her death), and briefly dated the real Mary Jane before she disappeared into limbo during a pitched battle against the Green Goblin (she fell into a dimensional portal because of a machine the Green Goblin had that created portals leading into other dimensions called the Time Dilation Accelerator).

By the close of the series, Peter had been chosen by Madame Web and the Beyonder to prevent the creature known as Spider-Carnage from destroying all of reality, who was living in a different reality opposite from Peter's, leading a whole group of other Spider-Men from different realities to go against Spider-Carnage. In defeating Spider-Carnage using the uncle Ben who was alive in another reality that Peter and Spider-Carnage went into (it belonged to one of the Spider-Men who was rich and had his identity public), Madame Web fulfilled her promise to help Spider-Man find Mary Jane.

=== Blade ===
Eric Brooks (voiced by J. D. Hall) first appears in the episode entitled "Neogenic Nightmare Chapter 9: Blade the Vampire Hunter". In that episode, Spider-Man and Blade first meet each other, and it also marked the very first appearance of Whistler in any version of the Marvel Universe, as Whistler had never appeared in a comic book before. In this episode, Blade comes to New York to hunt down Morbius, after realizing it was not Spider-Man, who he was originally targeting, who was sucking the blood out of the citizens of New York. It was also revealed that Blade was the son of a vampire man with a human mother, but became orphaned after his mother left him in a foster home after she realized she, too, would become a vampire from her mate. Whistler, who was a vampire hunter at the time, had discovered Blade with his unique potential of having all the strengths of a vampire but none of their weaknesses, except for the thirst of human blood (plasma, as it is called in the series for censorship reasons). Whistler took Blade under his care, trained him to use his vampire powers for good and helped Blade's vampire urge for getting human blood by giving him a serum which would make him more human, but only if he wanted to be more human, and the serum always worked. By the end of the episode, after Blade was almost killed by Morbius in confrontation if it were not for Spider-Man, the latter teamed up with Blade so they could stop Morbius into turning all humans into vampires (Morbius told Blade this at the start of their confrontation).

In the following episode "The Immortal Vampire", Blade once again makes an appearance alongside Spider-Man. Morbius attempts to use the Neogenic Recombinator to turn everyone else into a vampire. Spider-Man and Blade manage to stop him (Morbius' love, Felicia Hardy, persuaded Morbius not to turn her into a vampire and for him to become a human again, but Spider-Man and Blade accidentally directed the active Recombinator at Felicia, but Morbius had thrown himself in the direction and became a full, incurable vampire). Blade also found a love interest in Police Lieutenant Terri Lee, who was a mutual ally to Spider-Man. In the show's fourth season, in the episode "Partners in Danger: Chapter 7: The Vampire Queen", Blade returns and hunts down the Vampire Queen, his mother.

=== Black Cat ===
Felicia Hardy (voiced by Jennifer Hale) and her alter-ego, Black Cat, were depicted as the first potential love interests for both Peter Parker and Spider-Man, respectively, rivaled only by Mary Jane Watson. Felicia is the daughter of business woman Anastasia Hardy, and had only vague memories of her father, John Hardesky, a career jewel thief known as the Cat, who had been imprisoned for years in the top secret and guarded prison of S.H.I.E.L.D. because he had memorized the super soldier formula, which would fall into enemy hands if he was kept free. As Felicia's civilian identity, she is a slightly petite (unlike her alter-ego) but nonetheless she is a very beautiful blonde girl with a crisp brogue and a sharp mind. In an episode where there was a charity ball, she danced with Peter and even kiss him. She briefly dated and fell in love with Michael Morbius. Morbius ended up becoming a vampire during a science experiment and disappeared. After Spider-Man rescued her mother from the Green Goblin, Felicia fell in love with him. Then she realized that she could not have a relationship with Spider-Man, she dated another man named Jason Philips. The latter was later revealed to be Hobgoblin, ending their relationship when he was sent to prison. The revelations left her devastated.

In the fourth season "Partners in Danger" arc, Black Cat was finally introduced, as Wilson Fisk, the Kingpin of crime (whose civilian identity regularly worked with Anastasia Hardy), learned of John Hardesky memorizing the supersoldier formula and had him abducted from the prison known as S.H.I.E.L.D., the Kingpin sent Dr. Octopus (who was blackmailing Anastasia at the time with Hardesky's criminal past) to kidnap Felicia and threatened John if he did not reveal the super soldier formula, Felicia would die. Hardesky told the Kingpin about the formula and it was tested on Felicia to make sure John was not lying. The formula gave her great physical strength, agility and dexterity, and the ability to alter her physical appearance, turning her hair white. She was originally a crook for the Kingpin to do his bidding, but soon teamed up with Spider-Man and broke her father free from the Kingpin, putting Hardesky back into S.H.I.E.L.D. on John's will, unbeknownst to either Felicia or her mother (the knowledge from Hardesky was kept secret with Spider-Man). Spider-Man and Black Cat were partners for the following four episodes until the fourth season's seventh episode, where she teamed up with Blade and Morbius to track down and kill Blade's vampire mother, Miriam. Black Cat returned three times after this, first in the fifth-season premiere, attending Peter Parker's wedding with the clone of Mary Jane Watson. In the process, she helped Spider-Man and Kingpin defeat Goblin Warriors that were created by Alistair Smythe. In her second return appearance, she helped Spider-Man save Mary Jane's clone from the clone of Hydro-Man in the two-part The Return of Hydro-Man episode. At this point, she explains to Spider-Man that she came back because she needed a break from vampire hunting and after Mary Jane was rescued, she says that she must return to Morbius and hunt down Blade's mother and that it is where she is needed. She then takes off to return to Europe.

Her final appearance was in the final two episodes of the three-part Secret Wars, joining Spider-Man's team as they fought the Red Skull, Dr. Doom and other villains. In the process, she met Captain America, sharing the origins of her powers (but not her identity) with him. In the end, she returns her feelings back towards Spider-Man. After the Secret Wars ended, she rejoined Blade and Morbius with no memory of her experiences in the Secret Wars.

=== Daredevil ===
Matthew "Matt" Michael Murdock (voiced by Edward Albert), the son of prize-fighter Jonathan "Jack" Murdock, was shocked to discover that his father had worked a deal with Wilson Fisk, the Kingpin of Crime. Running from his father in shame, the devastated youth was almost killed by a chemical truck hauling radioactive waste, which splashed into his eyes and blinded him. His father swore revenge against the Kingpin, for it was the Kingpin's truck that had almost killed Matt; however, the crime lord learned of Jack's intentions and had him killed before he could reveal the information to the authorities, for it was illegal to carry radioactive waste in New York.

Wanting revenge on the Kingpin, much as his late father, Matt discovered that his blindness somehow heightened his senses to superhuman levels, allowing him to navigate with ease in even the most unfamiliar environments.

Training with his mentor, a man known only as "Stick", Matt took on the identity of Daredevil, the "Man Without Fear", a vigilante who fought crime and whose primary priority was to defeat the Kingpin and bring down his criminal empire. Taking up the legal profession of an attorney, Murdock moved to New York's "Hell's Kitchen", a dingy, drug-strewn ghetto, bringing Daredevil's fight for justice to the place where justice was needed most.

Matt Murdock eventually took on Peter Parker as a client after the Kingpin had set up. Teaming up to clear both Peter and Spider-Man's names, Daredevil vowed to Spider-Man, who he revealed to him that Wilson Fisk was the Kingpin, that he would not rest until the Kingpin was brought to justice. Though the Kingpin himself escaped, Daredevil still roams the rooftops and alleys of Hell's Kitchen, making certain that the corrupt never again pray on the weak.

=== Nick Fury ===
Colonel Nicholas "Nick" Joseph Fury (voiced by Philip Abbott in "Day of the Chameleon", Jack Angel in later episodes), an eye patch wearing war veteran thought to have been killed in combat, became the leader of the secret police organization S.H.I.E.L.D., he and the rest of S.H.I.E.L.D. were involved in such adventures with Spider-Man such as stopping the Chameleon from killing two international delegates from signing a peace treaty, fighting against the Kingpin's forces to reacquire John Hardesky for Hardesky's super soldier formula knowledge and trying to stop the Kingpin and his rebranded Insidious Six from acquiring the Red Skull's Doomsday Device. The villain Electro destroyed S.H.I.E.L.D. during the five-part Six Forgotten Warriors story arc; Nick's whereabouts and present condition are unknown.

=== Kraven the Hunter ===
In this show, Sergei Kravinoff (voiced by Gregg Berger) has a more heroic personality than he did in the comics. He made his debut in the episode "Kraven the Hunter". He has a fiancée named Dr. Mariah Crawford. Sergei became Kraven the Hunter when Sergei saved Mariah from a group of jungle cats, and Sergei was seriously wounded. Crawford uses an immediate-health serum on him, given to her by a former colleague of hers who was mutated while missing in Africa, to save his life, which causes him to become insane, and giving him extraordinary strength and agility in the process. Mariah moved back to New York City to work on a cure for the serum but Sergei tracked her down, believing Crawford was cheating on him with another man. Mariah teamed up with Spider-Man to cure Sergei but Sergei even kidnapped Joseph Robbie Robertson, a friend of Spider-Man's, because Sergei believed Robertson was the man Mariah was cheating on him with. Sergei was cured by the end of the episode by Spider-Man to prevent him from attacking innocent people.

In "Morbius", he makes a cameo when Mariah calls him from New York to Africa about Spider-Man having his disease mutated. In "Duel of the Hunters", a mutative disease turned Spider-Man into a spider-like monster which went on a Hulk-like rampage, and Kraven was sent to track him down. His hunt was initially interrupted by the Punisher, who wanted to kill Spider-Man, but they eventually worked together to track down Spider-Man and restore his human form.

In "The Return of Kraven", he came back to New York to cure Mariah when Sergei gave the serum that made him become Kraven to his love because Mariah was dying from a disease that was plaguing Africa, turning her into Calypso. Sergei became Kraven again and tracked down Calypso throughout New York, with Spider-Man and newcomer superhero known as Black Cat on his tail, thinking he is Calypso. When Empire State University students Debra Whitman and Flash Thompson figured out Calypso's DNA, in which it was female, Spider-Man and Black Cat figured out about this and heard Kraven's story. The three of them teamed up and when they gave Calypso the curing serum, it only half-cured her, leaving her somewhere in between Dr. Mariah Crawford and Calypso. When Spider-Man wanted to cure her all the way back to Mariah, Mariah herself refused and she and Sergei ran off somewhere in an undisclosed location, where their fates are unknown.

In Spider-Man '94, a sequel comic series, he heard rumors about Morlun, an immortal being feasting on totems, tracking him back to New York and teams up with Spider-Man to stop him.

=== Lizard ===
Curt Connors (voiced by Joseph Campanella) first appeared in the episode "Night of the Lizard". Here, the Lizard was portrayed as possessing a genius level of intelligence but also having the savage mindset from the comics. His initial plot in his first appearance was to make the Neogenic Recombinator turn everyone around the world into humanoid lizards like him, but Spider-Man stopped him and reused the Recombinator to turn the Lizard back to his human form.

The non-mutated Curt Connors had many other appearances as a supporting character. In the Lizard's four appearances between "Night of the Lizard" and the "Secret Wars" 3-parter portray him as villainous and much more of a brute, even lacking signs of his intelligence that was displayed back in the pilot episode.

=== Doctor Strange ===
Dr. Stephen Vincent Strange, M.D. (voiced by John Vernon) used to be an expert surgeon and when he got into a car accident, he lost the ability to use his hands. He then went to a mystic figure known as the Ancient One, expecting that the Ancient One could help him out with his problems. When the Ancient One refused to do so, Stephen was left as a lonely and broken man but when he figured out the Ancient One's student, Baron Mordo, was planning to assassinate the mystic figure, Stephen tried to warn the Ancient One, but Mordo prevented him. Surprisingly, the Ancient One knew of Mordo's plan all along and foiled it, exiling Mordo for his assassination attempt. Despite Stephen's failure to warn the Ancient One, the Ancient One granted him mystic powers for being noble enough as to at least try to warn the One.

Doctor Strange and his sidekick Wong help Spider-Man rescue Mary Jane from Baron Mordo and Dormammu. After that, Stephen detected the presence of Madame Web.

==== Wong ====
Wong (voiced by George Takei) appeared along with Stephen Strange, in the episode "Doctor Strange" as Stephen's sidekick. Wong wielded twin swords that were mystically enhanced.

=== Madame Web ===
Madame Web (voiced by Joan Lee) had a recurring role in the third and fifth seasons, giving Spider-Man cryptic yet always vital advice in his adventures and battles against his foes and eventually led him to the Beyonder. Instead of being a mutant, Madame Web was a cosmic entity of great mystical power (dwarfing Stephen Strange's powers). Apparently, she had no human origin.

In the series, Web first appeared in a cameo in the third season's premiere episode, "Doctor Strange", where she spied on Spider-Man, Mary Jane, Stephen Strange and Wong after MJ was saved from Dormammu and Baron Mordo, and Stephen even sensed Web's presence.

She made a full appearance in the next episode, "Make a Wish", introducing herself and revealing her knowledge of Spider-Man's life and secret identity. In the series, her role was typically to act as cryptic adviser to Spider-Man, offering him strange clues and riddles that would ultimately help him, as well as supposedly training him for the upcoming "Ultimate Battle". Spider-Man's relationship with Madame Web was reluctant as he wanted to live his life autonomously, whereas she insisted he would need her knowledge for the upcoming difficulties. The pair did separate for a while because when Spider-Man was going to quit in the third-season finale, Web warned him that the two-headed monster will rise above from the underworld. What Web meant by that was that his enemy, the Green Goblin, would figure out his secret identity, and Spider-Man knew the Goblin was Norman Osborn, and the two identities would clash. When Web refused to bring Green Goblin and MJ from limbo, where they both got stuck into thanks to the Green Goblin's portal making Time Dilation Accelerator machine, under Spider-Man's insistence, that is when they separated.

At the end of "The Return of Hydro-Man" Pt. 2, she returned when the "Ultimate Battle" (analogous to the "Secret Wars") occurred, which was after Spider-Man's wife, Mary Jane's clone, had died off (due to her unstable cell structure which caused her to evaporate). After Spider-Man had won in the battle against evil in the entire three-part Secret Wars episode, this ultimately led to the two-part series finale of the show, Spider Wars, where it is revealed the "Secret Wars" was merely a test for Spider-Man to see how formidable for the "real" challenge he would be when he would have to lead Spider-Men from other dimensions to stop an insane Spider-Man villain known as Spider-Carnage from destroying all of reality. Spider-Man succeeded and Web carried out her promise to Spider-Man they would find Mary Jane throughout limbo.

=== Morbius the Living Vampire ===
Michael Morbius (voiced by Nick Jameson) first appeared in his human form in "Insidious Six" two-part episode. In these episodes, he has a romance with Felicia Hardy (a.k.a. Black Cat). In the episode entitled "Morbius", he stole a vial of Peter Parker's blood in the belief that this was part of Peter's entry in a science competition they were both competing in. While examining the blood in his laboratory, one of the vampire bats he was experimenting on escaped, and began to lap it up. When Michael tried to scare the bat away, it bit him. The bite infected him with Peter's irradiated blood, transforming him into a living vampire.

He appeared as a villain in the following four episodes, "Enter the Punisher", '"Duel of the Hunters", "Blade the Vampire Hunter" and "The Immortal Vampire", along with "The Awakening" and "The Vampire Queen" in Season 4. In his earlier appearances, he goes on a rampage to turn everyone into Vampires. However he was stopped by Spider-Man and Blade in "The Immortal Vampire". At the end of "The Vampire Queen", Morbius stopped becoming an evil blood sucker thanks to a serum created by Abraham Whistler which suppresses anyone who has a vampiric urge for human blood, but only if they wanted to be human and joined forces with vampire hunter Blade and superhuman Black Cat, who is Felicia's alter-ego that Morbius figured out in "The Awakening", to stop Blade's evil mother, Miriam.

Morbius made a cameo at the beginning and end of the second episode of the animated version of "Secret Wars", along with Blade, who were not only concerned about stopping Miriam but curious where Black Cat went (she was transported from Earth to the Secret Wars planet to fight alongside Spider-Man as one of the heroes to help him). That was the last appearance of Morbius in the show.

A notable thing about Morbius is that the censorship for the show did not allow vampires to appear. To allow the use of Morbius, he could not bite victims to drink their blood. Despite having fangs, and evidently being a vampire, he instead had to drain victims through blood suckers on his hands and blood is only referred to as "plasma".

=== Punisher ===
Frank Castle (voiced by John Beck) used to be a United States marine. Frank's wife and son were shot dead by a group of evil gangs and this caused Frank to seek vengeance towards criminals by killing every single one of them he could find around the world, with the help of his computer sidekick, Microchip. Frank believes he is not bringing himself vengeance, but punishing those who do wrong (hence the Punisher). Frank first appeared in the series when he believed Spider-Man was a murderer who kidnapped Empire State University student Michael Morbius, while Morbius ironically actually left the hospital all along. Frank had tried his best to hunt down and capture a mutated, six-armed Spider-Man. Suddenly, Spider-Man had mutated into the Man-Spider due to his life evolution, a giant man-sized spider and then Frank was even more determined to kill Spider-Man now, as well as with a challenge from Sergei Kravinoff. Eventually, Sergei and Frank teamed up to cure Spider-Man and Frank called off his manhunt for the persecuted superhero.

Later Frank returned in Season 4 when he felt like killing every single criminal was not working for his life and he wanted to do something good in one innocent person's life. Opportunity knocked for him and approached Anna Watson who was missing her niece, Mary Jane, who had been gone for some time in the series. Anna blamed Mary Jane's boyfriend, Peter Parker, for her disappearance. Frank began looking for Mary Jane with Peter at the top of his suspect list, tracking him down wherever he went. Frank then tracked the Green Goblin (Harry Osborn) but could not find out what he knows about Mary Jane's disappearance as Harry was too insane. Ironically at the time when Peter got back into his house and Frank got him cornered, the clone of Mary Jane appeared, even though no one realized it was not the real MJ, and after a short reunion between Peter and Mary Jane's clone, Frank gave the clone to Anna and he left, feeling good on the inside of himself now.

=== Abraham Whistler ===
Whistler (voiced by Malcolm McDowell in the first two appearances, Oliver Muirhead in later appearances) is a former vampire hunter. When he went to New York City one time, he discovered a lost child who is a human-vampire hybrid who has all of the strengths of a normal vampire but none of their weaknesses, except for their thirst of human plasma. Whistler then took the child under his wing, called him Blade and trained him to use his powers for good and hunt and kill vampires as he grew up, as well as giving him a serum that would suppress him of his vampire thirst for blood, but only if Blade wanted to. He told him how he discovered Blade to Spider-Man and detective Terri Lee in the show. Whistler had appeared first in the series in the episode, "Blade the Vampire Hunter" (which was also Blade's debut in the show) and last appeared in "The Vampire Queen" which told that Blade's mother is really now the evil vampire queen of Earth.

=== Iron Man ===
Tony Stark (voiced by Robert Hays) first appeared in the episodes "Venom Returns" and "Carnage" in which Dormammu orders Venom to steal the Time Dilation Accelerator from Stark Enterprises, which is capable of releasing Dormammu from his own far-off dimension. When Rhodey is too wounded to continue fighting, Tony teams up with Spider-Man and stops the Symbiotes and prevent Dormammu from leaving his dimension. Tony also makes a cameo in the episode called "The Spot", in which Tony fires Dr. Jonathon Ohn from the Time Dilation Accelerator project because Tony knows the project is dangerous after Carnage almost released Dormammu to Earth using Accelerator machinery.

Tony later appears in the three-part episode Secret Wars in which the Beyonder creates a war between good and evil to see who is better. He and Mister Fantastic work together to use a machine to awaken the dormant part of Lizard where Curt Connors' mind is located. In the end, the heroes win and everyone, except for Spider-Man who has to stop the evil Spider-Carnage from destroying all of reality in the following series finale, is sent back to Earth without any memory.

=== War Machine ===
Rhodey Rhodes (voiced by James Avery) is a friend of Tony Stark. Rhodey first appeared in the episodes "Venom Returns" and "Carnage" in which Dormammu orders Venom to steal the Time Dilation Accelerator from Stark Enterprises, which is capable of releasing Dormammu from his own far-off dimension. Venom is quickly defeated by Spider-Man and War Machine. However, Venom gets help from Cletus Kasady, his cellmate who has bonded with another symbiote, Carnage. After the Symbiotes steal the machine, Rhodey is too wounded to continue fighting, so Tony teams up with Spider-Man and stops the Symbiotes and prevent Dormammu from leaving his dimension.

=== X-Men ===
The X-Men from X-Men: The Animated Series appeared in the crossover episodes "The Mutant Agenda" and "Mutants' Revenge".

Cyclops (voiced by Norm Spencer), Wolverine (voiced by Cal Dodd), Rogue (voiced by Lenore Zann), Storm (voiced by Alison Sealy-Smith in "The Mutant Agent" and "Mutants' Revenge", Iona Morris in the "Secret Wars" three-parter), Beast (voiced by George Buza), Gambit (voiced by Chris Potter), Jubilee (voiced by Alyson Court), Jean Grey (voiced by Catherine Disher), and Professor X (voiced by Cedric Smith) were featured as the X-Men.

In the "Mutant Agenda" episode, Spider-Man's progressing neogenic mutation is making him ill and he seeks the aid of Professor X. In doing so, he meets the X-Men who attack him for trespassing until Professor X breaks up the conflict. Spider-Man is disappointed to learn that Xavier does not 'cure' mutancy, only helps those born that way to accept and control their abilities. Wolverine in particular took issue with Spider-Man viewing his mutation as a curse. Beast however was more sympathetic to the super-hero's plight and attempted an olive branch towards him. This meeting of heroes was soon followed by a plot by Herbert Landon and the Hobgoblin to destroy mutants everywhere. But Spider-Man and the X-Men work together to defeat them and end their plot.

Later, Storm appeared in the "Secret Wars" battle on the good side against the evil side.

=== Captain America ===
Captain America (voiced by David Hayter) first appeared in "The Cat" episode as a cameo, in which Peter Parker is narrating a flashback scene about how Captain America got his powers while reading an article of John Hardesky. Later, Captain America appeared in the five-part "Six Forgotten Warriors" episode. In this episode it is revealed that after Steve Rogers was turned into Captain America, the lab was blown up by a Nazi spy and the key scientist was killed in the explosion.

Captain America would later be paired up with six other people that were subjected to the remnants of the super soldier formula as they fight the Red Skull's forces. Captain America and Red Skull got trapped in a vortex as a result.

Some years later, Chameleon had released Red Skull and Captain America from the time dilation loop where neither of them have aged. Captain America, Spider-Man, and the Six American Warriors fight Red Skull even when he turns his son Rheinholt. However at the end of the five-parter Captain America, Electro, and Red Skull get trapped in the time dilation loophole, again.

Later, Captain America appeared in the three part "Secret Wars" episode in which Spider-Man choose Captain America along with some other heroes to defeat the villains involved in the Wars, which also included the Red Skull.

=== Six American Warriors ===
The remnant of the super-soldier formula were enough to create at least five more superhumans that make up the Six American Warriors, but their powers were temporary and were given rings that would keep their powers permanent, as long as they kept them on. Captain America and the Six American Warriors fought Red Skull's forces and defeated them at the cost of Captain America and Red Skull getting sucked into a vortex. The Six American Warriors took the rings needed for the device and went their separate ways.

In this episode, the Kingpin and the Insidious Six steal the rings from the five heroes to use the Red Skull's doomsday device with the final one claimed near the site of the doomsday device when it turned out that Thunderer was posing as a homeless man. The Chameleon tricks the Kingpin and releases the Red Skull and Captain America, who were trapped in a time dilation loophole and never aged a day because of it. Later, the Red Skull unleashes the Doomsday Device by turning his son Rheinholt Kragov into Electro. The Six Warriors reunite, along with Spider-Man, and defeat Electro and the Red Skull.

The Six American Warriors consisted of:

- Black Marvel (voiced by Paul Winfield) - Omar Moseley is a college professor who is an old friend and teacher of Robbie Robertson. He used to work for Dan Lyons as his chauffeur and assistant. When Dan Lyons was the original candidate, his father spoke against this and Omar offered to take his place. The experiment gave him enhanced strength, agility, and stamina as Omar wore a full costume to keep his heritage a secret.
- Miss America (voiced by Kathy Garver) - Madeline Frank possesses density manipulation.
- Whizzer (voiced by Walker Edmiston) - Robert Frank possesses super-speed.
- Destroyer (voiced by Roy Dotrice) - Keene Marlowe is an old friend of Uncle Ben who possesses super-strength and agility.
- Thunderer (voiced by Hansford Rowe) - Jerry Carstairs possess as super-sonic attack. He stayed close to the Doomsday Device by posing as a homeless man.

=== Fantastic Four ===
The Fantastic Four guest starred on the three part "Secret Wars" episode in which the Beyonder forces a team of heroes to battle a team of villains to see who is stronger: good or evil. The Beyonder had chosen Dr. Doom to be one of the villains, so Spider-Man chose the Fantastic Four since they had a past with Doctor Doom enabling the computer to bring Mister Fantastic (voiced by Cam Clarke), Invisible Woman (voiced by Gail Matthius), Human Torch (voiced by Quinton Flynn), and Thing (voiced by Patrick Pinney) to the planet.

At the end of the story, after the heroes won, the Beyonder sent the Fantastic Four back without any memories of the Secret Wars, which had occurred for every other person involved in the Wars except for Spider-Man, who had to deal with the evil Spider-Carnage's plans of destroying all of reality in the following series finale.

== Villains ==
=== Baron Mordo ===
Baron Mordo (voiced by Tony Jay) first appears in the episode "Sins of the Fathers Chapter 1: Dr. Strange". In the show, Mordo appears as Dormammu's minion. In his first appearance, he was ordered by Dormammu to steal the Wand of Watoomb to make a portal that would release him from his dimension. To do so, Mordo brainwashes Mary Jane Watson to become his servant by passing himself off as her long-lost father. His plan almost succeeded, but Spider-Man, Doctor Strange, his assistant Wong, and Mary Jane stopped him from freeing Mordo's master from his dimension. Mordo's origin is also revealed in this episode where he was once a student under the mystic figure known as the Ancient One's teachings. But when Mordo tried to kill the One, which was discovered by Strange who attempted to stop Mordo but Mordo in turn had stopped Strange, the Ancient One foils Mordo's assassination attempt and expels him, revealing that he had known about Mordo's plan all along.

Later in "Venom Returns" and "Carnage", Mordo was ordered by Dormammu to bring the Venom symbiote back to Earth to make Eddie Brock whole once more. Then, Dormammu orders Mordo to give Brock a message. At Stark Enterprises, Mordo disguises himself as Orden Bloom to get the portal. When Spider-Man and War Machine join forces to fight Venom, Dormammu tells Mordo that there is another symbiote, which Mordo then bestows to Cletus Kasady, naming the result into the evil "Carnage".

After retrieving the probe, Dormammu orders Carnage to steal the "life force" energy from humans, so he may gain enough strength to enter our world. When Carnage absorbs too much force, Mordo brings him back to his lair to drain the power into an urn. When Carnage moves to send the urn into Dormammu's portal, Spider-Man, Iron Man, and Venom interrupt. Mordo ordered Carnage to throw the urn to unleash Dormammu, but was thwarted. Sacrificing himself, Venom pulled Carnage into the dimension following Dormammu's reversion, after which Mordo made his escape.

=== Big Wheel ===
The Big Wheel (voiced by Michael Des Barres) is Jackson Weele, the head of a band of high-tech thieves, whose technology is stolen by the Rocket Racer. Weele goes after Rocket Racer. It takes the combined power of Spider-Man and the Rocket Racer to stop the Big Wheel and put him behind bars.

=== Carnage ===
Carnage is a symbiote who is the offspring of Venom. When the recently arrested Cletus Kasady (voiced by Scott Cleverdon) witnessed Brock's reunion with his symbiote, he was soon offered the chance to merge with the symbiote's spawn. Becoming Carnage, he was sent out to capture enough "life energy" from human beings to provide Dormammu the strength to enter our world. Because of the degree of censorship placed on the show, this version of Carnage is less violent than his appearances in the comics, merely draining life from his victims rather than killing them outright. He was eventually defeated by Spider-Man, Iron Man, and Venom, as he, Venom and Dormammu were sent hurling through a dimensional vortex.

In the series finale, the Carnage symbiote emerged from a dimensional portal into an alternate reality, and bonded with the emotionally-unstable Peter Parker of that world. The joining of the two created the insane Spider-Carnage, who was threatening to destroy all of reality, using an invention that combined the dimensional warp generator and an enormous bomb. The real Peter Parker, assisted by several other Spider-Men from other universes, were able to convince Spider-Carnage to fight off the symbiote. This was done by bringing in Peter's Uncle Ben from a reality where he was not murdered. Peter knew the symbiote was influencing Spider-Carnage to commit this genocide, since they were in fact the same person and Peter could never kill another human being. Uncle Ben was able to convince Spider-Carnage he could still be a hero as long as he had the courage to reject the symbiote. However, the Carnage symbiote was too powerfully bonded and despite Spider-Carnage's best efforts, he could not get rid of it, so he threw himself into a dangerously unstable warp hole where he was killed by vaporization.

=== Chameleon ===
Chameleon was an international hitman and spy. He also cannot (or does not) speak while he is in his true form, although in the episode "Framed" Richard Fisk indicates that Chameleon told them about Peter Parker's parents. Chameleon has a belt, which is capable of capturing an image of a person, so that he can turn into a person to disguise himself, and then makes a perfect imitation of his disguise's voice. In his debut episode "Day of the Chameleon", he attempts to kill two diplomats at a U.N. conference to start a war, but is foiled by Spider-Man who easily picks the Chameleon out from the crowd since he had taken the appearance of Peter Parker, secretly Spider-Man's alter ego.

In "The Insidious Six" and "Battle of the Insidious Six", Chameleon became a member of the Insidious Six.

Later in "The Cat", it was revealed that he was jailed in S.H.I.E.L.D. for his dangerous international activities and was assigned by the Kingpin to release John Hardesky from his cell. Chameleon was infused with techo-organic nanobots prior to his incarceration in S.H.I.E.L.D., giving him the ability to disguise himself without the belt. He successfully disguised himself as Felicia's father so no one would know the real Hardesky was abducted. Eventually, his ruse was uncovered by Nick Fury.

Later in "Six Forgotten Warriors" parts 1–5, he was rescued by the rest of the Insidious Six and became a member again, but would betray them and join forces with his foster father, the Red Skull (they have no relation in the comics), and his brother, Rhienholdt Kragov, who would later become Electro. In the end, Electro and the Red Skull, along with Captain America, were trapped in a time dilation loophole and the Chameleon apparently dies in an explosion after being captured by Spider-Man, never to be seen again.

=== Susan Choi ===
Susan Choi (voiced by Amy Hill) was a federal agent. She was working with Richard Fisk and Chameleon in a plot to frame Peter Parker for getting restricted government information. Terri Lee discovered the truth which led to the arrests and convictions of Choi, Fisk and Chameleon.

=== Doctor Doom ===
Doctor Doom (voiced by Tom Kane) is an enemy of the Fantastic Four.

The show re-imaged Doctor Doom's role in the "Secret Wars". In this episode, Doom turned part of the alien world he was on into New Latveria after driving Doctor Octopus out of the territory. However, he did not use his ruling powers for evil and had the aliens who lived in his country live in peace and harmony. He even kidnapped the Thing only to cure him of his deformity and powers with a special device turning him back to Ben Grimm. After tricking Grimm into revealing the knowledge provided by Spider-Man on how the Secret Wars began, Doom then stole the powers from the Beyonder and almost killed the superheroes that Ben fought aside with, but the Thing knocked Doom out and the powers of the Beyonder were returned to the mystic figure himself. Doom was then returned to Earth with no memory of these events, along with every other superhero and villain.

=== Doctor Octopus ===
Doctor Octopus (voiced by Efrem Zimbalist Jr.) made several appearances in the show. Doctor Octopus used to be Otto Octavius, who was Peter Parker's science teacher at Science Camp. This relationship of former mentor and pupil made Doctor Octopus fond of Peter even after his descent into villainy. One day, Octavius created a fusion experiment, using four metal tentacles. When the experiment exploded, Octavius' tentacles were permanently stuck on his back. In his first appearance, Doctor Octopus kidnaps Felicia Hardy and J. Jonah Jameson for ransom from Felicia's mother, as Felicia's mom did not have patience to fund Ock's experiments before he was a villain. When Peter calls him, Doctor Octopus decides to have Peter bring the ransom. But Doctor Octopus reveals he would not release Felicia and Jameson anyway but after he was defeated by Spider-Man, who Peter was secretly, after Ock threw Peter off into another part of the abandoned space lab Ock hid out in, Dr. Octopus was captured, and was taken to jail where his tentacles were anchored to the wall of his cell.

Later, he became a member of The Insidious Six in the first two episodes of Season 2 and the five-part episode, "Six Forgotten Warriors" in Season 5, and one of the Kingpin's enforcers after the first episodes of Season 2, helping him commit crimes. At one point during "The Insidious Six" episode, Kingpin swayed Doctor Octopus into the group by offering him his own laboratory. He even came far as unmasking Spider-Man with the Insidious Six. Since Spider-Man did not fight as good as he usually does because it was part of Spider-Man's lively evolution, Ock thought he was a fake and Peter Parker dressed as him when he could not find the real Spider-Man. He also came to wiping out Spider-Man's memory and making him think the two were partners-in-crime. But thanks to Spider-Man's fangirl Tiana and a cabbie named Mousie, he got his memory back and Octavius was sent back to jail.

Ock eventually became aware that Anastasia Hardy's husband John Hardesky was a cat burglar known as the Cat and used this information to blackmail Mrs. Hardy into giving him his money. He was abducted by the Kingpin with help from Chameleon and was forced to work for him and his plans were not to reveal to the world that Mrs. Hardy's husband was a crook but merely use John Hardesky because he was jailed for knowing the super-soldier formula that created Captain America during World War II. After Hardesky was kidnapped, Ock was sent to kidnap Felicia to blackmail Hardesky that if he did not reveal the super-soldier formula, she will die. Hardesky revealed the formula and it was tested on Felicia, turning her into the Black Cat.

His final appearance in the show was in the three-part "Secret Wars", in which he ruled an alien planet city renamed "Octavia". However, it was stolen by Doctor Doom and renamed it New Latveria, forcing Ock to work for the Red Skull. When Doom absorbed the Beyonder's powers, Doom transported Alistair Smythe, the Red Skull and Ock back to Earth with them getting amnesia from the events.

In the series finale of this show, despite Ock not appearing in it, Spider-Man was sent by Madame Web and the Beyonder to stop the evil Spider-Carnage from destroying all reality, and helping Spider-Man were other Spider-Men from different realities. One of them had metallic tentacles like Ock and that Spider-Man explained it was a "souvenir from my last fight with Doc Ock".

=== Dormammu ===
Dormammu (voiced by Ed Gilbert) first appears in the episode "Sins of the Fathers Chapter I: Doctor Strange". In the show, Dormammu is a demon from another dimension who must consume souls to sustain himself. In this episode, he orders Baron Mordo to steal the Wand of Watoomb to free him so he can enter this dimension and feed on the souls of New Yorkers. Dormammu is stopped by the combined efforts of Spider-Man and Dr. Strange.

Dormammu and Mordo appear again in the episodes "Venom Returns" and "Carnage". In these episodes, Dormammu orders Mordo to reunite Eddie Brock with his symbiote, releasing the threat of Venom once more. Mordo then orders Venom to retrieve a device from Stark Enterprises that can open portals from other dimensions, so that Mordo can bring Dormammu to this dimension. After seeing that Venom's hatred of Spider-Man is preventing him from retrieving the device, he orders Mordo to give the symbiote's recently born offspring to madman Cletus Kasady, which creates the composite villain Carnage. After retrieving the device, Carnage is tasked with collecting life energy for Dormammu in order for him to get enough strength to enter our world, which he does. However, in the end, Dormammu, Mordo, and Carnage are defeated by Spider-Man, Iron Man and Venom, and Spider-Man expels Dormammu back to his dimension. Carnage is pulled into Dormammu's dimension along with Venom, and with the device destroyed from Iron Man, Dormammu is stopped from entering our world again.

=== Electro ===
Electro (voiced by Philip Proctor) made an appearance in season five. In this show, he was Rheinholt Kragov, instead of Max Dillon. During the course of "Six Forgotten Warriors" in which he appears, it is revealed that this version of Electro is the Red Skull's son and the Chameleon's half-brother. Prior to his father's return, Rheinholt posed as the chief of police of a Russian city. While he posed as Red Skull, Rheinholt was unmasked by Kingpin to not be the real Red Skull as Kingpin noted that the real Red Skull would've broken free from Kingpin's grasp. In this portrayal, Electro is much more powerful than his comic book counterpart as he is seen taking over the circuitry of vast machines and essentially brings all of S.H.I.E.L.D. to its knees. He is only defeated when Spider-Man tricks him into connecting himself to a machine made to generate a void in the space-time continuum, which traps him inside a time loop.

Kragov appeared in most of the episode arc in the episodes, "Unclaimed Legacy", "The Secrets of the Six" and "The Six Fight Again" before he became Electro and as the villain, he only appeared in "The Price of Heroism".

Electro appeared so late and is different in the show because during the show's creation, a Spider-Man film helmed by James Cameron was in production. Electro was to be one of the film's villains, alongside the Sandman, who was the only major Spider-Man villain to never appear in the series. This is also why Spider-Man's origin story was not told until much later into the show.

=== Gibbon ===
Gibbon is a gibbon-like mutant using banana-shaped bombs. Debuting in the second issue of the comic sequel series Spider-Man '98, he, Grizzly, Leap-Frog and Kangaroo escape from prison and fight Spider-Man until Morlun interferes, forcing the criminals to retreat.

=== Green Goblin ===
Norman Osborn (voiced by Neil Ross), later known as the Green Goblin, is Spider-Man's archenemy and the father of Harry Osborn. Norman was indebted to the Kingpin for various shady loans that he was unable to repay, so the Kingpin asked Osborn to kill Spider-Man in return. Osborn then hires Spencer Smythe to build Spider-Slayers to kill Spider-Man. After the plan fails, Osborn hires Hobgoblin to kill Wilson Fisk. But the assassination is foiled by Peter Parker, and the Kingpin suspects a conspiracy against him. For his failure, Osborn fired the Hobgoblin. Hobgoblin then joins with Kingpin and kidnaps Norman's son Harry Osborn for the crime boss. When Hobgoblin sees that Kingpin will not pay him immediately, he eventually betrays the Kingpin by going to Norman for better weapons to kill the Kingpin and Osborn can have his company and son. Osborn gives him a better glider and weapons and by the time the Hobgoblin returned to the Kingpin, Hobgoblin realizes that the Kingpin knows he was going to double-cross him, causes the Kingpin to flee, having the Hobgoblin think he died and took over his empire. The story concludes with the Kingpin, Osborn, and Spider-Man all loosely allying themselves to defeat the Hobgoblin, who escapes after crash-landing into the water. In the end, Osborn sells 50% of his company to the Kingpin to repay his debt, Harry Osborn is returned safely, and the Kingpin rebuilds his headquarters.

Osborn later appears as the Green Goblin, kidnapping his stockholders one by one. Spider-Man uncovered an underwater base where the Goblin intended to kill everyone he had kidnapped. Fighting the Goblin, Spider-Man unmasked him, only to discover that the Green Goblin was Norman Osborn, rather than the suspected identity of his son, Harry. Amnesia ensued and Norman was unable to remember his dual identity. The following morning at Oscorp, he announced that he will no longer build chemical weapons, to the Kingpin's dismay.

=== Harry Osborn ===
In this adaptation, Harry Osborn (voiced by Gary Imhoff) was Peter Parker's roommate in college. Their friendship seemed less strained and Gwen Stacy was not featured. Harry played an overall minor role, though he did act as a something of a rival for Mary Jane Watson's affections in at least one episode.

After the original Green Goblin becomes trapped in limbo, he appears to Harry. Soon, Harry unwilling made into a replacement for and by the original Green Goblin, who contacted him while in a limo. Harry tried to kill Spider-Man numerous times while the Green Goblin promised to allow Harry to see his presumed deceased father, Norman Osborn. However, Harry always failed, once getting into some trouble with Punisher as well. In the end, Harry realized in horror that the Green Goblin was his father and instead of wanting to quit, he began to lose his sanity. Now acting as if he enjoys becoming the new villain, he continued to want Spider-Man dead. This led to a fierce confrontation where Spider-Man knocked him out while on the George Washington Bridge. He was then taken to Ravencroft by Spider-Man.

Later, when Peter Parker and the clone of Mary Jane Watson were getting married, Harry found out and grew insane, as he was in love with MJ. He interrupted the wedding and threatened to blow up the church the wedding was taking place, wanting Mary Jane to marry him instead of Peter. In the end, Liz Allan appealed to Harry, convincing him not to blow up the church nor marry Mary Jane's clone. Told by Liz that he is loved, he walked out peacefully and the wedding resumed as Green Goblin tries to contact Harry.

=== Grizzly ===
Grizzly is a supervillain wearing a bear themed suit. Debuting in the second issue of the comic sequel series Spider-Man '98, he, Kangaroo, Gibbon and Leap-Frog escape from prison and fight Spider-Man until Morlun interferes, forcing the criminals to retreat.

=== Hammerhead ===
Hammerhead (voiced by Nicky Blair) has a head that is made of an unbreakable steel known as adamantium, which is what Wolverine of the X-Men's skeleton is covered with. Hammerhead worked for the crime lord known as Silvermane and was with him when some of the other crime lords were plotting to overthrow the Kingpin.

When Silvermane sent Hammerhead and his men to steal the mystic Tablet of Time, which can reduce the user's age, when it was arriving in New York, Spider-Man foiled the attempt and the object was taken to Empire State University to be observed by Dr. Curt Connors. As for Hammerhead, Silvermane harassed Hammerhead for his failure and was thinking about replacing him with someone else. Hammerhead quit working for Silvermane and began to work for the Kingpin. When Alistair Smythe used his Mega Slayer robot to steal the Tablet of Time, Silvermane decided to blackmail the Kingpin after using the villain known as Tombstone to kidnap the crime lord's wife and Dr. Connors who knows how to operate the Tablet. Kingpin got back to Silvermane by sending Hammerhead to kidnap his daughter, Alicia, and a deal was made that if Kingpin give away the Tablet and Alicia to Silvermane, then his wife, Vanessa, would come back to him completely safe and sound. Kingpin refused to give the Tablet and Alicia away by the meeting where a brawl involving Spider-Man occurred and Silvermane had taken the Tablet, Dr. Connors and his wife, Margaret, while Vanessa came back to Kingpin unharmed. Hammerhead tried to kidnap Alicia, but Spider-Man stopped him and defeated Hammerhead, where Alicia subsequently took Spider-Man away while Hammerhead was out. After Spider-Man saved Dr. Connors and his wife, Silvermane was turned to a baby from overuse from the Tablet and though the mystical object was thought to have been destroyed in an explosion, Hammerhead had saved it and brought it back to the Kingpin so the crime lord could sell it for a large price. This however caused Vanessa to divorce him and afterward, Kingpin demanded Hammerhead to rid of the Tablet and sold it to Adrian Toomes.

=== Herbert Landon ===
Herbert Landon (voiced by David Warner) was a former friend of Hank McCoy. He first appears in season two as a scientist working for the Brand Corporation and the Kingpin. Landon despises mutants and develops a chemical that will destroy them, falsely claiming to the Kingpin that he is building a mutant army and to the public that he is creating a mutant cure. When the Hobgoblin attempts to steal Landon's formula, a fight ensues in which Landon is doused in the formula, turning him into a reptilian mutant who needs to feed on electrical energy to survive. The X-Men and Spider-Man reverse the procedure, but Landon remains mutated on the right side of his body.

=== Hobgoblin ===
The Hobgoblin (voiced by Mark Hamill) is a criminal-turned-assassin who, in his first appearance, gets hired by Norman Osborn to kill New York's most feared criminal mastermind, Wilson Fisk, also known as the Kingpin, in which the Hobgoblin himself did not know that Fisk was the Kingpin. Osborn was indebted to the Kingpin for various shady loans that Osborn was unable to repay. After the assassination is foiled by the appearance of Spider-Man and Peter Parker when they save Fisk when he was going to create a criminology school and cause the Hobgoblin to flee, the Hobgoblin demands Osborn to pay him and he will take another chance to kill Fisk, but Osborn refuses to pay him and fires him. This sets off a chain of events in which the Hobgoblin is curious about why Osborn wants Fisk dead and while snooping around Fisk's building, he is captured and realizes Fisk is the Kingpin.

Just when the Kingpin would kill the Hobgoblin, the Hobgoblin asks for a chance for a partnership with the Kingpin and defeat Norman Osborn, the man who hired the Hobgoblin to kill Fisk. Kingpin was so despised at hearing this news and Osborn for what he did that he aligns with the Hobgoblin and sends him to kidnap Harry Osborn, Norman's son, in order for the elder Osborn to make good on his payment. When Hobgoblin sees that Kingpin will not pay him immediately, he eventually betrays the Kingpin by going to Norman for better weapons to kill the Kingpin and so that Osborn can have his company and son.

=== Hydro-Man ===
Hydro-Man (voiced by Rob Paulsen) was portrayed as Mary Jane Watson's former high-school boyfriend, Morris "Morrie" Bench. In his self-titled episode, Hydro-Man stalked Mary Jane and Spider-Man tried to stop him, but Hydro-Man was too powerful in battle as he can create and control water. At the end of the episode, Spider-Man and Mary Jane worked together to defeat Hydro-Man. They led him away from any water source, weakening him so much that when he tried to attack Spider-Man, he collapsed and evaporated.

In "The Return of Hydro-Man", it is revealed that Dr. Miles Warren created a clone of Hydro-Man, using what was left of the original Hydro-Man from the ground he was killed on that had not evaporated yet. However, the clone was still in love with Mary Jane so it demanded that Warren make a clone of Mary Jane as well. Even though it was hard to clone Mary Jane (she fell into a dimensional portal in Episode #41), Warren succeeded but Mary Jane's clone decided to be with Peter Parker rather than Hydro-Man. When it escaped, Hydro-Man later attacked them at Niagara Falls on their honeymoon. When all that was revealed by Warren himself, the scientist discovered that the clones were not stable and would vaporize. The clone of Hydro-Man went first and then MJ's clone.

=== Iceberg ===
Iceberg (voiced by Lawrence Mandley) is an ice-covered crime lord. Hobie Brown used to work for him.

=== Kaine ===
Kaine Parker is the secondary antagonist of the Spider-Man '94 sequel comic series. He was sent by Morlun to hunt down Spider-Man. After his failure, his life force was absorbed by Morlun as punishment.

=== Kangaroo ===
Kangaroo is a supervillain wearing a kangaroo themed armor. Debuting in the second issue of the comic sequel series Spider-Man '98, he, Grizzly, Gibbon and Leap-Frog escape from prison and fight Spider-Man until Morlun interferes, forcing the criminals to retreat.

=== Kingpin ===
The Kingpin (voiced by Roscoe Lee Browne) is the main antagonist of the series, the archenemy of Daredevil, and one of Spider-Man's greatest adversaries. The character is fairly close to the comics version, but he is often occupied with manipulating super-powered characters to do his bidding. He serves as the criminal mastermind behind the creation of the Spider-Slayers and is responsible for the formation of the Insidious Six.

Initially he operated behind the scenes until a two-part episode where his identity was revealed to Spider-Man with the help of Daredevil, who was seeking revenge for his father's murder at Kingpin's hands.

The Kingpin's associates here was first Alistair Smythe. After Smythe almost betrayed the Kingpin because he believed Kingpin was going to kill him for his son being in jail in the two-part episode where his identity was revealed to Spider-Man, Dr. Herbert Landon replaced him.

This series also described an origin for the Kingpin, somewhat different from the comic-book version. As a boy, Wilson Fisk (born Wilson Moriarty) was influenced by his father, who sought employment as a mob criminal. When older, Fisk assisted his father in robbing banks and jewelry stores, culminating in one robbery where his father escaped but Fisk, hampered by his already-considerable weight, was captured by the police. In adulthood, after being released from prison, Fisk emulated his father's goal and climbed to a position of seniority within the mob, adopting the alias "Kingpin". He has had his police file destroyed, removing all record of his earlier arrest and imprisonment. He arranged for the arrest and conviction of his father, still an aspiring but minor criminal, and declared that he did this because "sacrifices must be made".

He maintains a strained relationship with his wife Vanessa, who is well aware of his activities, while his son Richard works for him.

The Kingpin has many enemies, other than Spider-Man, his most recurring enemy. Among these foes of his include opposing crime boss Silvermane, and the two supervillains, the Green Goblin and the Hobgoblin. Also unlike the comic book version mostly every supervillain works for him, or he forces them to work for him, like he did to Doctor Octopus in season 4. He was the most powerful criminal that Spider-Man faced.

In Spider-Man '94 #4, a sequel comic series, Kingpin became the new Mayor of New York City.

Two alternate versions of Kingpin appear in the series finale:

- The first version is from Ben Reilly's dimension in which Spider-Carnage had him use Hobgoblin and Green Goblin to destroy much of the city.
- The second version is a lawyer to the high-tech Spider-Man who was tricked by Spider-Carnage into helping him.

=== Lizard Warriors ===
The Lizard Warriors are a group of lizards that came in contact with Curt Connors' DNA in the sewers and mutated into humanoid forms. They revere Lizard as their father and want him to rule. Spider-Man was able use a special bomb made by Martha Connors and Debra Whitman to regress Lizard back to Curt Connors and the Lizard Warriors back to their original forms.

==== Monitor ====
Monitor (voiced by Rodney Saulsberry) is a Lizard Warrior and the de facto leader of the group who leads the Lizard Warriors into making Lizard their leader.

==== Gecko ====
Gecko (voiced by Roger Kern) is a Lizard warrior.

==== Gila ====
Gila (voiced by Kathy Garver) is a female lizard warrior.

=== Man-Spider ===
When Spider-Man was bitten by the radioactive spider that gave him his powers, it also had a terrible side effects of giving him a disease that was part of his evolutionary cycle. The cycle would eventually lead Spider-Man into becoming the sadistic beast known as the Man-Spider (vocal effects provided by Jim Cummings). When Man-Spider was terrorizing citizens in New York, the crime-killing vigilante known as the Punisher and one of Spider-Man's past enemies who was also one of his friends, Sergei Kravinoff, teamed up and temporarily cured Spider-Man of his disease. Spider-Man permanently got rid of the disease when he was fighting the villain known as the Vulture in the two-part second-season finale. One of the Vulture's powers was absorbing youth from people younger than he was and when Vulture absorbed Spider-Man's youth, he also absorbed his powers but consequently, he even absorbed his disease. Vulture demanded from Dr. Curt Connors, who was treating Spider-Man's disease at the time, to help cure him while at the same time teaming up with the Scorpion to defeat Spider-Man after draining the disease back into Spider-Man. However, Connors betrayed Vulture and only gave Spider-Man back his youth and powers, leaving Vulture with Spider-Man's condition. In the series finale, Spider-Man encounters an alternate universe version of himself who mutated and gained six arms without fully transforming into the Man-Spider. This Spider-Man later fully transforms and is returned to his home universe by the Beyonder.

=== Miranda Wilson ===
Miranda Wilson (voiced by Beverly Garland) was an actress who was nearly killed in an accident involving her movie that Quentin Beck caused. She had fallen into the river. When she reached the shore, she saw in the river's reflection that half her face was badly scarred. She went through the catacombs hiding her face. Mysterio found her collapsed on the ground and rebuilt her by making her part cyborg. When she learned that they remaking her movie, she kidnapped Mary Jane (who looked a lot like her) and tried to put her mind into Mary Jane's body but was stopped by Spider-Man and Mysterio. She and Mysterio were killed in an explosion after revealing their love for each other.

=== Miriam ===
In this show, Miriam (voiced by Nichelle Nichols) is Blade's mother. She was turned into a vampire by Blade's father while she was pregnant with Blade. She came to New York to turn Spider-Man, Detective Terri Lee, Black Cat, and Blade, along with many other people into vampires. This plan was thwarted with help from Morbius.

In the three-part "Secret Wars" episode, Blade, Black Cat, and Morbius tracked Miriam to a castle. The fight was interrupted when Black Cat was transported to another planet by Spider-Man.

=== Molten Man ===
Molten Man is a criminal who appears in Spider-Man '94 #1. He was one of many enemies who Spider-Man regularly fought. During one of their fights, Spider-Man threw him onto a fire hydrant to dampen his powers and gave him up to the police wrapped in an asbestos containment suit. It is currently unknown if he is related to Liz Allan like in the comics.

=== Morlun ===
Morlun is the main antagonist of the Spider-Man '94 comic series. Morlun was born in the kingdom of Lokka, being heir to the throne that his parents wanted him to take, though Morlun refused as he craved adventure. He wandered the Earth until when he came home, the kingdom got attacked by creatures named Totems, mystical human-animal hybrids, which he discovered he could consume the lifeforce of, extending his lifetime, which, however, came at a cost of him going into stasis inside a cocoon for a long time. Each time he reinstated himself, he was forced to change his names and identities, with the most recent being an Englishman named Gabriel Sims, who founded Sims & Company, which would transform into Sims Foundation, as Morlun also took the identities of his own descendants, eventually being known as Ezekiel Sims.

=== Mysterio ===
Mysterio (voiced by Gregg Berger) was a supervillain who blames Spider-Man for ruining his reputation. In his first appearance, Mysterio frames Spider-Man for various crimes, but his plan is exposed by Spider-Man and Detective Terri Lee, and he is jailed. Later, he becomes a member of the Insidious Six in the episodes "The Insidious Six" and "Battle of the Insidious Six", but the entire team fails and disbands to avoid being arrested.

In Mysterio's final appearance in the series, "The Haunting of Mary Jane", his ex, Miranda Wilson, creates a studio in secret and kidnaps the clone of Mary Jane Watson and Spider-Man teams up with Mysterio, battling robot versions of villains Spider-Man fought in the past in a deathtrap Mysterio had designed to one day lure Spider-Man to and kill him. Spider-Man discovers that Mysterio was in love with a woman named Miranda Wilson, a former actress who was disfigured and planned the entire kidnapping to swap bodies with the similar-looking Mary Jane. The studio exploded, Spider-Man saved Mary Jane, and Mysterio dies in the explosion, staying with Miranda to the end.

In the five-part "Six Forgotten Warriors" storyline in which the Kingpin hires the Insidious Six again, Vulture replaces the late Mysterio.

=== Owl ===
His only appearance was in the second-season premiere of the series, "The Insidious Six", where he is portrayed to be one of the crime lords with Silvermane and against the Kingpin. He did not have any spoken dialogue in this scene.

=== Red Skull ===
Red Skull (voiced by Earl Boen) made a cameo in the second episode of Season 4 in the episode "The Cat" where his men posed as allied operatives and sent John Hardesky into the building where Captain America was being created. After John realized who the real bad guys are, he avoided Red Skull and his minions.

Later on during the "Six Forgotten Warriors" story arc in Season 5, it was explained that after Red Skull and Captain America fought, they were trapped in a vortex. 50 years later, his son, Rhineholt, frees them both from the vortex, only for them to be trapped again.

Finally in "Secret Wars", the Skull was sent by Beyonder to an alien planet to fight Spider-Man and his team of superheroes after he was freed again, but was sent back to Earth with no memory of the events when Doctor Doom absorbed the powers of the Beyonder.

=== Richard Fisk ===
Richard Fisk (voiced by Nick Jameson) is loyal to his father and heads a company front called Fisktronics. In the two-part episode of "Framed" and "The Man Without Fear", Richard frames Peter Parker for selling government secrets, with the help of the Chameleon and federal agent Susan Choi. Spider-Man teams up with Daredevil in an attempt to clear his name. They capture Richard. At the trial, Richard, Susan Choi, and Chameleon are sent to prison for his figured crimes and after Peter was cleared of all charges.

Later on, Richard teams up with Tombstone in Ryker's Island Prison and agrees to frame Robbie Robertson in the episode "Guilty". They have him kidnapped, put a gun in his hand while he was unconscious and was sent to trial for a crime he did not mean to commit. He was originally supposed to go to New York State Penn but with the help of Richard's father, the Kingpin, Robbie was reassigned to Ryker's Island where he would be there for the next fifteen years. Spider-Man apparently figured out about Richard and Tombstone's plan and busted into Ryker's Island to save Robbie. Just when Richard and Tombstone would take off with their valuable cellmate in a helicopter, Spider-Man accidentally has the copter crash but not before saving Robbie (and the pilot, who was working for the Kingpin under Richard and Tombstone's interests) and have Richard and Tombstone fall back to Ryker's Island ironically.

Richard made his last appearance in the show in the Season 4 finale, "The Prowler", in a flashback appearance when he was saved by Hobie Brown from getting killed by bags of powder from another incarcerated criminal. Richard told his father of the news and got Hobie out of prison.

=== Rhino ===
Little is known about the past of Rhino (voiced by Don Stark). He first appeared as hired muscle for The Kingpin, and was ordered to steal the Promethean X from John Jameson's shuttle. After Spider-Man nearly killed him in his black symbiote costume, Rhino left their battle petrified of the wall-crawler.

What he lacks in intelligence, he makes up for with brute strength and a huge horn on the top of his head. Rhino is loyal to the Kingpin, and refused to reveal any information about his employer to Spider-Man, and chose to suffer prison rather than squeal on his boss. This loyalty was rewarded when Kingpin offered the Rhino a part in his Insidious Six, a team of supervillains he created for the sole purpose of killing Spider-Man.

=== Scorpion ===
Scorpion (voiced by Martin Landau in seasons 1–2, Richard Moll in seasons 4–5) works for J. Jonah Jameson as an investigator, but is nervous, plump, and balding. In an attempt to discover Spider-Man's real identity, Jameson hires a scientist to use Dr. Connors' Neogenic Recombinator to turn Gargan into a superhero called the Scorpion. This incarnation is similar to the original comics version of the Scorpion, with superhuman strength and agility resulting from his genetic enhancement, using the Neogenic Recombinator, with scorpion DNA - referred to by the scientist who carries out the experiment as "a natural predator of the spider" - and an externally mounted cybernetic weapon-tail. He encounters Spider-Man on a roof top, and after a short battle is able to defeat the wall crawler. However, when he is about to unmask Spider-Man, his body is overcome with pain, and he begins to mutate further, developing yellow eyes, green skin, and claws. At that point, madness at the horror of what he has become descend upon him and blamed Jameson for it. The Scorpion then attempts to gain access to a nuclear reactor, insanely believing it will restore him to normal. He bearhugs, and almost crushes Spider-man to death, until J. Jonah Jameson attacks Scorpion "because you're a greater evil". Spider-Man stops him, sending him to jail.

In later episodes however he appears without the later mutations (although, sometimes when he gets really angry and attacks Spiderman, he gets his green face with fangs and yellow eyes again in a few seconds).

In "The Insidious Six", Scorpion becomes a member of the Insidious Six, created by the Kingpin, to kill Spider-Man, so Kingpin can settle off his debt with his enemy, Silvermane, but Spider-Man survived in the end. In "The Final Nightmare", he makes a plan to find a cure for his mutation by kidnapping Dr. Stillwell, the scientist who is responsible for turning him into a freak. Stillwell destroys the Neogenic Recombinator to prevent any other beings like the Scorpion from existing again. Later, he meets Adrian Toomes, a.k.a. the Vulture, who is as smart as Stillwell, and when Toomes' lab was blowing up, Scorpion saved him. In "Partners", where Moll replaced Landau, he makes another attempt to cure himself, but fails when Spider-Man stops him (this attempt was a plot created by Spider-Man because he needed Scorpion to give to Alistair Smythe to save the Black Cat).

In "The Wedding", Scorpion makes a bank robbery and Spider-Man is defeated. Then, he takes the wedding rings, so that he and his girlfriend Sara can get married. In both conflicts, Scorpion's tail gets broken off and he had to have it replaced.

Scorpion appears in the "Six Forgotten Warriors" five-parter as his last appearance as a member of the Insidious Six.

=== Shocker ===
Shocker (voiced by Jim Cummings) is a villain for hire. Alistair Smythe created the wristbands and electro suit that gives Shocker his power. Like the Rhino, the Shocker is loyal to the Kingpin, and served as muscle for him, accomplishing whatever was asked of him. He was originally hired to retrieve potentially incriminating evidence about the Kingpin from Eddie Brock. He was almost defeated by Spider-Man and his alien costume when they fought in a belltower.

He later joined The Insidious Six and again worked for The Kingpin to try to kill Spider-Man. As one of Fisk's most loyal supervillains, he was called upon time and time again.

Herbert Landon enlisted the services of the Shocker to kidnap Morbius and use his DNA to cure his mutation and make himself and the Kingpin immortal. However, they also attempted to kill Felicia Hardy/the Black Cat, enraging Morbius, and are nearly killed.

=== Silvermane ===
Silvermane (voiced by Jeff Corey as an old man, Townsend Coleman as a young adult, Matthew McCurley as a child, and Cannon Young as a baby) is an elderly crime lord. Although he is a villain, he is not a supervillain, as he has no superhuman powers, but is extremely intelligent. Although he is an enemy of Spider-Man, he does not see eye-to-eye with the superhero's other foes. He is a hated rival of Wilson Fisk, another crime lord. Silvermane is also the father of Alisha Silver, a spy who wanted the research of Dr. Curt Connors. He first appeared in the "Insidious Six" arc, where he has Hammerhead hired to capture Spider-Man. In the end of "Battle of the Insidious Six", he was rescued by Spider-Man from the Kingpin who tried to kidnap him.

Silvermane never enjoyed a normal childhood, as he grew into old age, he became obsessed with finding the secrets to youth and immortality. He heard legends of an ancient tablet which allegedly was inscribed with the formula to rejuvenate an individual's youth, the Tablet of Time. When the Tablet was unearthed and brought to the United States, he arranged for Tombstone to steal the tablet and kidnap Dr. Curt Connors, who was studying its powers. Even with the intervention of Spider-Man, Silvermane was able to kidnap Connors' wife and force Connors to activate the tablet. In the comic book the formula is for a potion. Connors prepares the potion for him, while the lives of Connors' family were used as a motivator for him to successfully decipher the tablet. Spider-Man saved Connors but Silvermane took the potion anyway despite Connors warnings of it being unstable. In the animated series version of the story, Silvermane was transformed into a baby instead of being mildly rejuvenated. There, the tablet focuses the sun's rays into lasers which produce a greenish glow. Silvermane is initially turned into a young man, fights the Lizard then transforms further into a baby. The Lizard is bombarded by the rays and mutates back to human form. Dr. Connors concludes that they might be able to use the tablet to stabilize Spider-Man's mutations, but the tablet is stolen by Hammerhead, now working for Wilson Fisk (Kingpin) after Hammerhead quit Silvermane during an initial attempt at trying to steal the Tablet, foiled by Spider-Man.

In a later episode, "Baby" Silvermane was seen to have retained his adult intellect. He and Alisha got the cyborg Alistair Smythe to kidnap the Black Cat (Felicia Hardy), blackmailing Spider-Man to apprehend the Scorpion. Baby Silvermane believes that he can use the Scorpion, who had been created through the use of Neogenics, to combine his genetic structure with that of a scorpion to swap bodies with Spider-Man. The Scorpion, meanwhile, in an attempt to go straight, was living with the Vulture. The Vulture, one of the originators of the Neogenic technology, believes he himself can use Silvermane's lab to make himself permanently youthful. During the Neogenic transfer, the Vulture intervenes, allowing Spider-Man, the Black Cat and the Scorpion to escape. Silvermane and the Vulture exchange energies in the neogenic transfer allowing the Vulture to become semi-permanently young again and reverting Silvermane back to an old man.

The episode "The Return of Hydro-Man" Pt. 2 reveals that Silvermane is the benefactor of Miles Warren who he is keeping anonymous.

==== Alisha Silver ====
Alisha Silver (voiced by Leigh-Allyn Baker) is a former classmate of Peter Parker who briefly dated her. She was also the brilliant lab assistant of Dr. Connors. She was later revealed to be the daughter of Silvermane in this show. After her father used the Tablet of Time and was accidentally transformed into a baby, she took over her father's job as crime lord.

During her brief time as a crime boss she has hired and worked with Hammerhead, Tombstone, Ivonna, and Vulture.

=== Spencer and Alistair Smythe ===
Alistair Smythe (voiced by Maxwell Caulfield) is the son of Spencer Smythe (voiced by Edward Mulhare). Spencer worked for Norman Osborn to create the Spider-Slayers in exchange that Oscorp makes the hoverchair for his son. Alistair later witnessed his father's failure to destroy Spider-Man (which, as in the comics, caused his apparent death) and was convinced to create Spider Slayers to later attack Spider-Man as part of a deal made with the Kingpin.

Smythe became Kingpin's primary accomplice for some time, even after Smythe's Slayers failed to kill Spider-Man. His association with the Kingpin came to an end after the two-parter "Framed/The Man Without Fear", when Spider-Man and Daredevil teamed up to fight the Kingpin, resulting in the arrest of Richard Fisk. Angered at his son's arrest, Kingpin blamed the incident on Smythe's "incompetence" and turned him against his will into the Ultimate Spider Slayer Cyborg with the help of the Kingpin's current replacement partner Herbert Landon. Breaking free of Kingpin's programming and recovering his father's body (which had been kept alive in a stasis pod by the Kingpin who secretly saved him), Alistair found another employer in Silvermane who promised to fund research to revive his father. Smythe kidnapped the Black Cat for Silvermane to coerce Spider-Man into getting either Scorpion or Vulture, to have the de-aged Silvermane restored to an adult. However, this plan was foiled thanks to the team-up of Spider-Man, the Black Cat, the Scorpion and the Vulture.

Still under Silvermane's employment, he worked with Harry Osborn, the second Green Goblin, who had Smythe build an army of Goblin Warriors to attack Peter Parker and the clone of Mary Jane Watson's wedding, while Smythe also helped Scorpion with other activities. Harry's plan failed in the end thanks to Spider-Man, the Kingpin and the Black Cat.

In "The Return of Hydro-Man" Pt. 2, Smythe was contacted by Miles Warren to have Silvermane's men repair his laboratory. While holding a fragment of Spider-Man's costume, Warren tells him that he's got an idea for his next cloning experiment.

In the three-part "Secret Wars" episode, Smythe worked under Red Skull.

An alternate Smythe appeared in the two-part series finale of the series, working for the Kingpin and Spider-Carnage to build a mind-control device to take over the world. However, Spider-Carnage's real intentions were to destroy all reality. After Spider-Man foiled his plans, Spider-Carnage fled to another reality, leaving a bomb in the Kingpin's building. Though the Spider-Men and the Kingpin of that reality were saved by being teleported out of the exploding building, Smythe and most likely everyone else in the building were killed.

=== Tombstone ===
Tombstone (voiced by Dorian Harewood) was once Lonnie Lincoln, a friend of Joseph "Robbie" Robertson who was not an albino. When he was a child, he accidentally threw his basketball through the glass of a grocery store. After seeing the store was closed, Lonnie decided to rob the store to get ice cream with Robbie's help (when it ended up closed upon Robbie taking too long with his homework). Lonnie ended up failing when the police came and arrested him, whereas Robbie ran away prior to the police's arrival. After his release, Lonnie became a crook while Robbie graduated with honors at schools. Eventually, Lonnie made a break-in at the Spaulding Chemical Plant to contact Robbie. While there, it was revealed that Lonnie wanted to frame Robbie to get his revenge for abandoning him back at the grocery store as Robbie left his fingerprints on the ladder. After Lonnie fell into the vat of chemicals by accident, Robbie decided to stay behind to face the consequences to think about abandoning Lonnie at the grocery store. While the police have not found Lonnie's body, Robbie's fellow reporters helped corroborate Robbie's claim to the police. After the fall, Lonnie's skin turned white, his hair yellow, and his flesh tough and rock-like.

He was hired by Silvermane to steal the Tablet of Time in his first two appearances "Tablet of Time" and "Ravages of Time". During an altercation with Spider-Man in Dr. Conners's lab, poison gas was released, choking Spider-Man as Tombstone bearhugged him, who was unaffected because he claimed that he did not need to breathe anymore. In fact, it is implied that he is a walking corpse, a member of the undead.

Later on in his self-titled episode, Tombstone appeared again and became the leader of a gang that had Robbie Robertson's son Randy as a member. Tombstone promised to set Randy free to Robbie if he kills the Silvermane story. During one heist, Tombstone had Randy be the only one to not wear gloves to incriminate him. Robbie refuses and Spider-Man captures Tombstone, having him sent to jail while Robbie and Randy inform Tombstone's actions to the police.

Later in the series, in the fourth-season premiere "Guilty", it was revealed that the prison Tombstone went to was Ryker's Island with Richard Fisk (who was incarcerated two episodes before Tombstone). Fisk and Tombstone agreed to team up and frame Robbie Robertson and Robbie was sent to prison at Ryker's thanks to the machinations of Fisk's father Kingpin. There, Robbie would live for the next fifteen years. He also met Richard and Tombstone there again and they revealed their entire plot to him. Apparently, Spider-Man found out about this whole plan with the help of J. Jonah Jameson and rescued Robbie just when Richard and Tombstone would escape with their cellmate, also putting them back to jail.

=== Venom ===
Like the comics' version of Venom, this version is a reporter named Eddie Brock (voiced by Hank Azaria), but unlike the comic story, Brock is introduced as an antagonist to Spider-Man prior to becoming Venom. Also the series made much greater strides at establishing the rivalry between the two as well as exemplifying Brock's motives, and linking him to other notable characters.

In the series, Brock is an ambitious reporter, but demonstrates quite a lack of integrity, and blames Spider-Man for his failures instead of his own poor judgement. Brock's story begins under the employment of newspaper owner J. Jonah Jameson. When he discovers that Dr. Curt Connors was the monstrous Lizard, he was eager to expose him for a Pulitzer-worthy story, and paid no consideration for Connors' family. He was stopped by Spider-Man, who transformed Connors back to normal in time for Brock to look like a fool in front of Jameson. Later, Brock collaborated with Norman Osborn and Spencer Smythe to expose Spider-Man on live TV, by capturing and unmasking him. However, when the captured Spider-Man turned out to be Flash Thompson in his own costume for a prank, Jameson fires Brock due to the humiliation of faulty journalism and has two security guards throw him out.

Afterwards, Alistair Smythe attacks Brock, Osborn and Jameson with a newly rebuilt "Black Widow" Spider-Slayer, blaming them for the supposed death of his father Spencer. During this time, Brock was shown trying to get a job at another newspaper company where its editor-in-chief had gotten information from Jameson that Eddie was "nothing but trouble". Brock begged the editor-in-chief to give him a chance which had the editor-in-chief take a shot at it as he is in need of a reporter. Just then, a Spider-Slayer arrives and chases Brock while wrecking the newspaper building. Brock was rescued by Spider-Man. Despite this, the Slayer's destruction caused the editor-in-chief to quote to an approaching Brock "Jameson was right, you're fired!" Again Brock blames Spider-Man and swears revenge.

In "The Alien Costume" three-parter, Brock manages to shoot pictures of Spider-Man at a crashed space shuttle, who was there to rescue the astronauts, John Jameson and his co-pilot. He attempts to frame Spider-Man to robbing the shuttle, which was actually robbed by the Rhino for the Kingpin. Jameson gives Brock his job back, and campaigned aggressively for Spider-Man's capture, until John Jameson reveals to his father about the man in the Rhino costume. Jameson retracts his campaign against Spider-Man and furiously fires Brock once again while calling for security to throw Brock out. Brock is never seen working for anyone again, and once again blames Spider-Man for his misfortune.

Soon, Brock would become bonded to an alien symbiote that was once attached to Spider-Man. The symbiote's original origin from the comics is altered. In this series, the alien was inadvertently brought back by John Jameson from his Moon-based space exploration. During their return, the astronauts are assaulted by the symbiote and crash their ship in the center of New York where Spider-Man arrives to help, inadvertently collecting the symbiote on his costume when he leaves. Brock, seeking revenge, follows Spider-Man to a church tower. Realizing that the symbiote costume's benefits are outweighed by the negative emotions it is creating, Spider-Man uses the sound of bells in the church tower to force it to leave his body, where it bonds with Brock below.

Upon merging with the symbiote, Brock gains the knowledge of Spider-Man's secret identity as well as many of his abilities and declares that "from now on we're poison to you Spider-Man, that's why we call ourselves Venom". He also reveals to Spider-Man that he has vast knowledge of the universe but the symbiote's main goal is to survive. He seemingly has an advantage over Spider-Man during their conflict but Brock's plan to exact revenge on Spider-Man comes to a halt when he is separated from the symbiote by Spider-Man, and taken to prison. Despite this he would later be reunited with both his symbiote and Spider-Man.

As a series adaptation of the original comic book stories, Venom's activities in the show are drastically different from the original written material. Despite the fact that he is a popular character, Venom was only featured in a handful of episodes (although he appears at the very end of the opening credits for each episode, even in seasons where he is not present). Brock's role as an antagonist changes, when he finds himself teaming with Spider-Man. In the episode "Carnage", when his symbiote's offspring known as Carnage, tries to take his girlfriend through a portal, Venom tackles Carnage, and he loses his grip on her. Both Brock and Venom are sucked in, his last words were that he had always loved her.

In his last appearance, a robotic copy of Venom and Carnage, reappear in "The Haunting of Mary Jane", before being blasted.

=== Vulture ===
Adrian Toomes (voiced by Eddie Albert as an old man, Alan Johnson as a young man) is an inventor and engineer. In his first three appearances in "Ravages of Time, "Shriek of the Vulture", and "The Final Nightmare", he is an elderly man who develops strong grudge against Norman Osborn for rejecting and ridiculing his work. Later, he used his Vulture talons to suck youth out of people to temporarily make himself young. In "The Final Nightmare", after draining Spider-Man's youth, the Vulture unintentionally got Spider-Man's mutation disease. At the lab, Dr. Connors tricked him into holding this disease, which causes him to go into hiding.

In "Partners", it is shown that he somehow got rid of the mutation disease by unknown means but then started changing from his young to old self (and vice versa), without control over this transformation. He also becomes young full-time by stealing baby Silvermane's youth, reverting Silvermane back to an old man. In the "Six Forgotten Warriors", part 1–5, Vulture became a member of the Insidious Six where he replaced Mysterio who died in an earlier episode.

== Other characters ==
=== Beyonder ===
The Beyonder (voiced by Earl Boen) differs greatly from the comics, as he sports a goatee as opposed to having a clean-shaven face. In all his appearances he also wore the brief "super hero" costume from Secret Wars II instead of the more usual disco outfit. He is also actually more of a good guy than a villain. The Beyonder first appeared in the episode "Arrival" of Season 5, the first chapter of that "Secret Wars" in the series. The Beyonder worked with Madame Web to prepare Spider-Man for the Secret Wars. When Doctor Doom was defeated in "Doom" (the third and last chapter to the "Secret Wars") after the villain temporarily stole the Beyonder's powers, the Beyonder had all the heroes Spider-Man had summoned to assist him forget their actions, and sent them home.

Spider-Man, however, was needed for something bigger, so he was the only one whose memory was untouched. It was revealed that the evil Spider-Carnage had destroyed the entire multiverse with a giant bomb. However, when the destruction reached the Beyonder's own reality, he used all of his powers to roll back time. Though it tested him to the extreme, he sent his servant, Madame Web, into the past to train Spider-Men from many different realities to find out which one would be worthy enough to lead the others against Spider-Carnage. In the series finale, he was growing weak because he had stayed too long out of his own reality, but had managed to find enough strength to teleport the six-armed Spider-Man, who had mutated into a Man-Spider, away back into another reality with him.

=== Bruce ===
Bruce is a stone gargoyle on top of a building whom Spidey talks to whenever he doubts himself. It is often thought that he got his name from Bruce Wayne aka Batman. This is due to the fact that sometimes, Spider-Man mocks Bruce. However, John Semper revealed in an interview that Bruce was named after his good friend, Bruce Helper.

=== Billy Connors ===
Billy Connors (voiced by Toby Scott Ganger) is the son of Margeret Connors and Dr. Curt Connors. He only appeared in the series premiere "Night of the Lizard".

=== Margaret Connors ===
Margaret Connors (voiced by Giselle Loren) is the wife of Dr. Curt Connors. She first appeared in the show's very first episode, "Night of the Lizard" and her last notable appearance was in "The Lizard King". Throughout most of her appearances, Margaret has been involved in one way or another in changing her husband, Curt, back into his human form from being the Lizard.

=== Calypso/Dr. Mariah Crawford ===
Calypso (voiced by Susan Beaubian) was initially introduced as a research scientist named Dr. Mariah Crawford, who was engaged to Sergei Kravinoff before his mystic serum transformed him into Kraven the Hunter. She assisted Spider-Man in several episodes

In "The Return of Kraven", Crawford was given the serum herself by Kravinoff when she fell ill from an African plague that she was help fighting. This transformed her into a feral woman who greatly resembled the comic version of Calypso except for having a lioness-like face and ears, different colored eyes, and claws. She was eventually half-cured by Spider-Man, Black Cat, and Kraven the Hunter and she refused to be cured all the way back to Dr. Mariah Crawford, running away with Kraven with the both of them with unknown fates.

During her appearances, she was called Calypso by Kravinoff even before she became the beast. Crawford explained to Spider-Man in the episode "Duel of the Hunters" that in Greek mythology, Calypso was a goddess who granted King Odysseus the gift of life.

In Spider-Man '94 #4, a sequel comic series, she died because of the effects of the serum. She was buried by Kravinoff in Affrica.

=== Mrs. Farrel ===
Mrs. Farrel (voiced by Telma Hopkins) is Robert's mother and only appears in the episode "Rocket Racer". Mrs. Farrell is a deeply caring and good woman, especially as a mother, to her son among others. She runs a small-time grocery store. She worries about her son for becoming the Rocket Racer, considering his unfavorable past as a street punk, and she believes, correctly though, that her son is a good, kind-hearted but misguided person. Her son's ultimate redemption as a street thug is worrying about his mom's physical health, which points that she might be considerably sick. When her store was threatened by thugs demanding protection money or else they will burn it down, her store was saved by Spider-Man and Robert.

=== Vanessa Fisk ===
Vanessa Fisk (voiced by Caroline Goodall) is the ex-wife of the Kingpin / Wilson Fisk. Vanessa loved her ex, Wilson Fisk, but hated his alter ego, the Kingpin. When Vanessa was kidnapped by the Kingpin's enemy force by Silvermane and she was brought back by Alistair Smythe's robot (Smythe was the Kingpin's current assistant at the time), she decided that she had enough of her husband's criminal life and left him, saying goodbye to him. Her later fate is unknown. Both she and Wilson had a son named Richard.

=== John Hardesky ===
John Hardesky (voiced by John Phillip Law) appeared in the second and third episodes of Season 4. It is revealed that he is Felicia Hardy's father, and was a crook known as the Cat, who was captured and taken into S.H.I.E.L.D., unbeknownst to Felicia who thought her father was deceased. John also knew the supersoldier formula that created Captain America in World War II, when John was a child. He was nearly tricked into giving the information to Nazi operatives posing as Allied soldiers, but he gave them and their boss Red Skull the slip.

Later, Wilson Fisk found out that John Hardesky knew about the supersoldier formula and had Hardesky abducted and the Chameleon posed as Hardesky and went in his cell. Kingpin sent Doctor Octopus to kidnap Felicia and threaten John if he did not reveal the super soldier formula, Felicia would die. Hardesky told Kingpin about the formula and it was tested on Felicia off-screen where she became the Black Cat. She was originally a crook for the Kingpin to do his bidding, but she teamed up with Spider-Man and broke her father free from Kingpin and destroyed the files on the formula before Herbert Landon can replicate it. At the end of episode "The Black Cat", Hardesky chooses to return to S.H.I.E.L.D. custody, so that no one can force him to reveal the formula again.

=== Anastasia Hardy ===
Anastasia Hardy (voiced by Rue McClanahan in the first appearance, Dimitra Arliss in season three, Nita Talbot in season four) is the mother of Felicia. She is a businesswoman and a single mother as Felicia's father, a career jewel thief known as the Cat, had been imprisoned for years because he had memorized the super soldier formula.

=== J. Jonah Jameson ===
J. Jonah Jameson (voiced by Edward Asner) has a hatred of Spider-Man which is based less on his powers and more to his concealing his identity behind a mask; in this continuity, his wife was killed by a masked gunman. He also portrays his integrity as a journalist, refusing to cover up the truth even when it is in his best interests, and portrays his loyalty to those who work for him. He secretly hired attorney Matthew Murdock to defend Peter Parker when Peter was framed by Richard Fisk and personally uncovered evidence exonerating Robbie when he was framed by Tombstone and Richard Fisk.

In Scarlet Spider's reality, Jameson was trying to make contacts to any survivors.

In the high-tech Spider-Man's reality, Jameson does not hate Spider-Man and is more friendly towards him.

=== John Jameson ===
John Jameson (voiced by Michael Horton) appeared in The Alien Costume saga in which he unwittingly brings the Venom symbiote to Earth. While recuperating in the hospital, John told his dad about a guy in a rhino suit attacking the crashed shuttle which led to Jameson firing Eddie Brock again. Shocker later abducted him from the hospital to draw Spider-Man and Jameson to the church. While Spider-Man fought Shocker, Jameson evacuated his son.

=== Stan Lee ===
Stan Lee (voiced by himself) appeared in the series finale as himself in an alternate reality (intended to be the real world where the viewers live in). The powerless Spider-Man takes the Prime Spider-Man to his reality, in which he is an actor who plays Spider-Man. In this reality, Spider-Man is a comic book character and Stan Lee created him. The Prime Spider-Man takes him for a swing and then stop at the top of a building. Lee helps Spider-Man understand how the hero's life works are based from his point of view as a writer, and Spider-Man thanks Stan Lee for creating him and making him a hero, then leaves after the conversation. Stan Lee then wonders how to get down from the building and hopes that the Fantastic Four might make an appearance and get him down.

=== Detective Terri Lee ===
Det. Terri Lee (voiced by Dawnn Lewis) was part of the NYPD that investigated cases that involved Spider-Man and to an extent Peter Parker, yet is unable to figure out the two are one and the same. At first, she had little trust for the web slinger, but over the course of the series she began to accept him as a worthy ally. She has ties to Cletus Kasady and has fallen for Blade.

She is based on Captain Jean Dewolff.

=== Ned Leeds ===
Ned Leeds (voiced by Bob Bergen) appeared in a little cameo in the series. Peter Parker and Ned had no rivalry to win over Betty Brant, as in the series, she never appeared and her place was taken by Glory Grant. Also, Ned did not become hypnotized by the Hobgoblin into becoming a villain.

=== Microchip ===
Microchip (voiced by Robert Axelrod) is a man whose nickname was Chip rather than Micro. He acted as the Punisher's accomplice and conscience, constantly urging him to use the non-lethal weaponry.

=== Uncle Ben Parker ===
Uncle Ben (voiced by Brian Keith) appeared in the series as a spirit talking to Spider-Man whenever he was frustrated in a mission or missions. The spirit of Uncle Ben first appeared in Mysterio's debut episode. It was revealed, like in the comics, in the second episode of the third season that Ben was killed by a crook Peter let go from a wrestling ring, causing him to turn into Spider-Man.

In the series finale of the show when Spider-Man had to stop the evil Spider-Carnage from destroying all reality, they were in a reality where Uncle Ben did not die and Spider-Man used him to make Spider-Carnage reformed. Spider-Carnage turned good and prevented the destruction of reality, but could not get rid of the symbiote. He created a portal that would cause anything inside of it disintegrate and jumped in, committing suicide. Although they lived in different realities, Ben said that he is proud of his nephew and Spider-Man said that he will always have him in his heart, implying that Spider-Man had informed Ben of his counterpart's death.

=== Aunt May Parker ===
Aunt May (voiced by Linda Gary in the first three seasons, Julie Bennett in the final two seasons) strongly disliked Spider-Man but loved his alter ego, her nephew Peter Parker. As in the comic, she does not know that her nephew is really Spider-Man. She had many encounters with villains Spider-Man fought like Venom, Hobgoblin, Doctor Octopus, Morbius, Chameleon (who was imitating Anna Watson), Tombstone, Green Goblin, Scorpion, and Shocker. She has a past with Keane Marlow as friends and also, Keane was May's late husband, Ben's friend as well (and unbeknownst to her, he was also a member in the 1940s superhero team called the Six Forgotten Warriors being named the Destroyer). May has a friend relationship with Anna Watson, and despite they like each other and May has some kindness to Mary Jane, Anna has no respect for Peter and he has to tolerate her (though there was a time when Peter blurted out to her in anger where she blamed him for Mary Jane getting kidnapped by the clone of the dead Hydro-Man) and Anna even once had respect for him when he was with Mary Jane after she was saved from the Hydro-Man clone. May even gave Peter and Mary Jane her wedding rings when she had with Uncle Ben before his death when Peter and M.J. were getting married.

By the series finale of the show, it was revealed that when the Beyonder and Madame Web rounded up Spider-Men from different realities, that in the Scarlet Spider and Spider-Carnage's reality, Aunt May was dead with Uncle Ben, but her cause of death was unknown.

=== Richard and Mary Parker ===
Richard and Mary Parker (voiced by uncredited actors) are Peter Parker's parents who both died when he was very young. They are only rarely mentioned in the series and only once appear, to Peter in a vision caused by Baron Mordo in "Doctor Strange". In the fifth-season episode "Six Forgotten Warriors", it is revealed that they were spies investigating a machine called Doomsday Device created by Red Skull in Russia. After learning from Nick Fury that his parents were branded as traitors, Peter traveled to Russia and cleared their names. Although their ultimate fates were not explicitly described, it is possible that they were killed by Red Skull, similar to the comic version where the Red Skull (Albert Malik) indirectly killed them when Peter's parents, as a spies, were investigating his criminal operations in Algeria.

=== Prowler ===
Hobie Brown (voiced by Tim Russ) appeared in his self-titled episode. He first appeared working for a crime lord called Iceberg and was feeling he was not earning his fair cut for the work he was doing. When Iceberg found out, he had his boys attempt to kill Hobie. After narrowly escaping that fate, he knew he needed to get out of town. He stole a passer-by's purse to fund his new trip. It turned out to be Mary Jane's purse when she and Peter Parker are in the process of apartment hunting but was stopped by Spider-Man and Hobie was sent to jail for violating his parole. While in prison, he saves Richard Fisk from an attempt on his life. As payment, the Kingpin arranges for a hot shot lawyer to enable Hobie's release and gives him a special suit. He used the costume to get back at his old boss Iceberg.

There are strings attached however: the belt will detonate if he tampers with it as Prowler was being shocked. This was part of Kingpin's plan to maintain Prowler's loyalty to him. He and Spider-Man team up against the Kingpin and destroyed the controls to the belt so it would not detonate and Prowler's suit is recharged. Hobie gave up crime so he can have a chance at returning to a normal 'good' life.

=== Rocket Racer ===
Rocket Racer (voiced by Billy Atmore) only appears in the episode "Rocket Racer". Robert had great skill in gyro mechanisms due to working at the Science center taught by Peter Parker. He created a cybernetically controlled, rocket-powered magnetic skateboard which he travels with and can attain speeds of 60 miles per hour (97 km/h). He can also scale walls. After Robert broke into a jewelry store, ultimately having a change of heart, he was chased by Spider-Man. Rocket Racer escaped but Spider-Man planted a tracer on him and found out his identity.

A criminal leader, whose machines were stolen, created the Big Wheel, a giant wheel with lasers, missiles, and spikes that was able to roll onto buildings and higher grounds. Spider-Man and Rocket Racer were able to stop the Big Wheel when Rocket Racer had Spider-Man electrocute the Big Wheel with two electric wires. The criminal was arrested. This taught Robert that education, not crime, would help him in the world to overcome his problems. He even helped Spider-Man defeat some thugs that plotted to burn down his mother's store due to lack of protection money.

=== Joseph "Robbie" Robertson ===
Joseph "Robbie" Robertson (voiced by Rodney Saulsberry) was J. Jonah Jameson's right-hand man and the person trying to have Jameson see that Spider-Man is not evil. Like in the comics, he was a former friend of Lonnie Lincoln, also known as Tombstone. Back when Robbie and Lonnie were kids, they last see each other when they wanted to get some ice cream but it was closed. Then Lonnie accidentally threw his basketball through a window and he insisted that Robbie would help him get to the cold junk food. Robbie boosted him up but he knew the police would come. He quickly abandoned him while Lonnie was arrested. Robbie felt guilty about leaving Lonnie on that point on. By the time Robbie got a job at a local newspaper years later, he would investigate about the Spalding Chemical Plant. He found Lonnie, now a crook, there so Robbie can be put to jail so he can have his revenge for abandoning him at the grocery store. Robbie tried to catch him but Lonnie slipped and fell into a chemical pool where Robbie thought he died. To mend his mistakes back years ago at the grocery store, he decided to stay until he let the police hear his story and they let him go when the people at the newspaper company vouched for him.

By the time he became Jameson's right-hand man, Robbie was horrified to figure out his son Randy is in a thug gang called the Posse. He found out that Lonnie managed to survive falling into the chemical pool but turned into an ugly mutant known as Tombstone, who also led the Posse. In the end, Spider-Man and Robbie teamed up to put Tombstone in jail and also have Randy figure out the Posse was no place for him.

By the fourth-season premiere of Spider-Man, when Tombstone was incarcerated in Rooker's Island and wanted to get revenge on Robbie for what he did, he teamed up with Richard Fisk, who was also incarcerated in Rooker's and was jailed earlier before Tombstone, and with Richard's connections, they had Robbie framed and taken to the same prison they were so Tombstone can kill Robbie, but Spider-Man and J. Jonah Jameson saved Robbie and cleared his name.

By the Six Forgotten Warriors saga at the fifth (and final) season of this show, Peter Parker lied to J. Jonah Jameson that Spider-Man was going to Russia to rule the world. Jameson believed him and Robbie went with Peter to accompany him and make sure he gets some pictures. Robbie acted weird while in Russia because he knew some people who would explain about Peter's parents when they were thought to be traitors to Russia. Robbie even knew Omar Mosley, who knew the story about the Six Forgotten Warriors. One of the Six Forgotten Warriors' members was the Black Marvel (who was said to be dead) and Omar said he was the Black Marvel's sidekick (but secretly, Omar was the Black Marvel himself). Robbie even figured out that Wilson Fisk was the Kingpin.

By the series finale of the show, in the Scarlet Spider's reality, all of New York was destroyed with nearly everyone dead, thanks to the murderous rampage the Green Goblin and Hobgoblin have committed. The only survivors were J. Jonah Jameson and Robbie. Hobgoblin threatened Jameson if he did not give the broadcaster on the roof of J3 Communications, then he would drop Robbie off a ledge. Spider-Man saved Robbie but surprisingly, Robbie hated Spider-Man as much as Jameson did because here as he claimed that Jameson was right about Spider-Man.

=== Martha Robertson ===
Martha Robertson (voiced by Iona Morris) is Robbie Robertson's wife and the mother of Randy Robertson. She first appeared in the episode "Tombstone" where Randy had joined a crime gang called the Posse led by a childhood friend of Robbie's. She later appeared in the episode "Guilty" where Robbie had been framed by Tombstone and Richard Fisk, although Robbie was soon released after Spider-Man and Jameson found evidence to prove Robbie's innocence.

=== Randy Robertson ===
Randy (voiced by Alfonso Ribeiro) first appeared in the episode "Tombstone", where he began leading a life of crime in a gang led by Tombstone called the Posse. It later appeared that Tombstone had been a childhood friend of his father. Spider-Man discovered that Randy was in this gang and Tombstone later revealed this to Robbie, but in the end, Spider-Man managed to reassure Randy that the Posse was no place for him, and Tombstone was imprisoned. Randy appeared in the episode "Guilty" when Robbie had been framed and imprisoned by Tombstone and his cell-mate Richard Fisk, although Robbie was soon released after Spider-Man and Jameson found evidence to prove Robbie's innocence.

=== Silver Sable ===
Silver Sable (voiced by Mira Furlan) is the leader of the Wild Pack who has appeared in the "Six Forgotten Warriors" saga. The Wild Pack accompanied her, and she served as both an ally and enemy to Spider-Man against both the Kingpin and the Red Skull.

=== Spider-Slayer ===
The Spider Slayers were a line of robots being commissioned by Norman Osborn for hunting Spider-Man. This culminated in Alistair Smythe working for the Kingpin; he would go on to not only recreate the "Black Widow" Spider-Slayer, but also at the same time to unleash the "Tarantula" and "Scorpion" Spider-Slayers. In this depiction, the three Spider-Slayers could join as a massive engine of destruction.

Later, Alistair would build another Slayer called the "Mega Slayer", a heavily armed humanoid robot operated by remote.

As a punishment for repeated failures, the Kingpin had Herbert Landon mutate Alistair into the "Ultimate Spider-Slayer". In this form, Alistair was capable of walking again and was incredibly strong and resilient, enough to restrain Spider-man in two crushing bearhugs and even take on the Kingpin. He also had twin horns growing from his shoulders, both of which were organic laser guns.

=== The Spot and Dr. Silvia Lopez ===
The Spot (voiced by Oliver Muirhead) and Dr. Silvia Lopez (voiced by Wanda De Jesus) appear in the episode titled "The Spot". In this episode, Jonathan Ohn is fired from his work for his work involving in the creation of dimensional portals. Since the events of the episodes "Venom Returns" and "Carnage", Stark thought it would be best if Ohn's work was shut down.

Kingpin locates Ohn, pretending to be appreciate Ohn's job of creating portals, and gives him a job with a woman whom he loves, Dr. Silvia Lopez. As weeks pass, Ohn and Lopez finish their work but Ohn falls into one of his portals, becoming the Spot when a whole group of portals attached to him. He can create portals with his mind. The Kingpin was frustrated with Ohn and considered him and Lopez very vague. The Spot used his portal-creating abilities to rob banks and jewelry stores to get more money to fund his research. He then deduces that he works for a criminal like the Kingpin and wants to take over the empire. However, the Kingpin uses Lopez to have the Spot capture and kill Spider-Man. The Spot confronts Spider-Man but the hero defeats him. Spider-Man is aware that if the Spot fails, Lopez would die and the two start to work together. In a battle to defeat the Kingpin, Ohn opens a portal that grows so big it had the potential to engulf the Earth, starting with New York City. Spider-Man, the Spot, Lopez and Kingpin work together to take down the portal. However, the Spot cannot completely close the portal from the outside. He jumps in but not before Lopez expresses her love for him. They were both sucked in.

An alternate reality version of the Spot appears in part one of the series finale in a cameo as Dr. Ohn, when the Scarlet Spider explains the origin of Spider-Carnage. In this reality, Ohn works for the Kingpin and accidentally releases the Carnage symbiote through one of his portals.

=== Gwen Stacy ===
Gwen Stacy (voiced by Mary Kay Bergman) appears in the series finale, when Spider-Man visits a parallel universe, in which Peter Parker (Armored Spider-Man) is a wealthy industrialist similar to Iron Man. Gwen Stacy is his fiancée, and Spider-Man reflects that his alternate self is engaged to a woman he does not even know (as he never met his reality's Gwen Stacy). Spider-Carnage, who wants destroy every parallel reality, kidnaps her, threatening to everyone present if one of them follows him, she will die first before he destroys all reality.

Spider-Man then understands that Spider-Carnage is not truly evil as he is confused because in his reality, his Uncle Ben and Aunt May have died and he is believed to be a clone to the Scarlet Spider, also known as Ben Reilly. Spider-Man then goes to the Uncle Ben who was alive in this reality (since this world's Spider-Man has never failed at anything, Uncle Ben was still alive) and tells him everything about Spider-Carnage's plan. Meanwhile, Spider-Carnage tells Gwen on how he will destroy all reality. Spider-Man and Uncle Ben then arrive and Ben reforms Spider-Carnage while Spider-Man frees Gwen. Spider-Carnage prevents the destruction of all reality but cannot remove the Carnage symbiote. Gwen then witnesses as Spider-Carnage jumps into an unbalanced portal, killing himself.

In this universe, Gwen Stacy is alive and engaged to a very successful but arrogant Peter Parker, who boasts that he never fails. This is an opposite of her real fate in the iconic story arc, "The Night Gwen Stacy Died", from the Amazing Spider-Man comics, where Spider-Man fails to save Gwen's life in his battle against the Green Goblin.

=== Farley Stillwell ===
Farley Stillwell (voiced by Michael Rye) was the scientist that led the experiment involving neogenics, an accident during this enabled Peter Parker to become Spider-Man. He also took part in the creation of the Scorpion.

At the end of season two, he disappears into the shadows, never to be seen again.

=== Flash Thompson ===
Flash Thompson (voiced by Patrick Labyorteaux) appeared in the series as an Empire State University student. While he had a contentious dislike of Peter Parker he greatly admired Spider-Man, willing to defend him verbally and became invariably involved in his conflicts. Flash initially pursued a relationship with Felicia Hardy, which did not work out and he later found a new, more comfortable, relationship with the brainy Debra Whitman.

=== Taina and Mousie ===
Maria Taina Elizondo (voiced by Stephanie Eustase) first appeared in the "Make a Wish" episode in which she meets Spider-Man, who shares his origin with her. At the end of the episode, Spider-Man is captured and brainwashed by Dr. Octopus.

In the next episode, Taina, along with the help of a kind cab driver Mousie (voiced by Anne-Marie Johnson), tries to stop Spider-Man and help him realize who he truly is. At the end of the "Attack of the Octobot" episode, it shows Taina lives at the Wish Come True Foundation for Terminally Ill Children, implying that Taina is dying.

=== Miles Warren ===
Miles Warren (voiced by Jonathan Harris) is a scientist whose clones were banned by the government. He was given an underwater laboratory by Silvermane who he kept anonymous. Warren's clones keep dissolving into vapour, because of their DNA. Warren would take interest in the super-villain Hydro-Man, who had the ability to transform himself into water. After finding a sample of his water that has not evaporated yet, he creates a clone of Hydro-Man. But the clone becomes violent without Mary Jane Watson, and demands that Warren creates a clone of her. In the end of the final part of "The Return of Hydro-Man", the clones of Hydro-Man and Mary Jane Watson degenerated. Warren was able to steal a sample of Spider-Man's DNA, in a possible attempt to clone him, and contacts Alistair Smythe to have Silvermane's men repaire his underwater laboratories.

Spider-Man later visited an alternate universe in which Warren had managed to create a Spider-Man clone, which had escaped. In this reality, the current Spider-Man found out about the clone, a reason led himself to believe he was the clone. He dyed his hair blond and called himself the Scarlet Spider and changed his name to Ben Reilly. The other Spider-Man, the clone, was bonded with Carnage symbiote and became Spider-Carnage.

=== Mary Jane Watson ===
Mary Jane Watson (voiced by Sara Ballantine) first meets a 19-year-old Peter Parker in "The Return of the Spider-Slayers" (Season #1 Ep #4). Mary Jane gradually supplants Felicia Hardy as his primary love interest. She is last seen in Season #3 Episode #14, "Turning Point", in which the Green Goblin discovers Spider-Man's true identity. In a nod to "The Night Gwen Stacy Died", he takes her to the George Washington Bridge. Spider-Man tries to save her, but she falls into a dimensional portal created by his stolen time dilation accelerator, but Spider-Man did not know about her falling into it. In Season 4, a clone of Mary Jane created by Miles Warren appears, and after the death of Mysterio at the end of the ninth episode of Season 4, Spider-Man revealed he was Peter to her and M.J. and Peter marry in the first episode of Season 5. Later, her true nature is revealed and she and a clone of Hydro-Man dissolve due to their unstable cellular structure.

In the high-tech Spider-Man's reality, Mary Jane is still friends with Peter Parker.

At the end of the "Spider Wars" storyline, the series ends with Spider-Man going with Madame Web to search for the real Mary Jane so that he can finally be reunited. She reappears along Peter in the season finale of X-Men '97, implying that he managed to find her and bring her back, which is later confirmed by series creator Beau DeMayo.

=== Debra Whitman ===
Debra Whitman (voiced by Liz Georges) was a prominent supporting character and a love interest to Flash Thompson. An ESU genetics major, she is portrayed as an extremely sharp intellectual. Unlike her comic appearance, she has no romantic relationship with Peter Parker, who considered her as his sister, though he sometimes found her annoying.

=== Glory Grant ===
Glory Grant (voiced by Nell Carter) is the secretary of J. Jonah Jameson at the Daily Bugle.

=== Agent X ===
Agent X (voiced by Rachel Davies) is a S.H.I.E.L.D. intelligence agent. She took part in the mission to capture Chameleon when the latter was on a mission to disrupt an international peace treaty. The character is clearly Black Widow, likely renamed to avoid confusion with one of the Spider Slayer robots.
