= Charles Fisk =

Charles Fisk may refer to:

- Charles Brenton Fisk (1925–1983), American organ builder
  - C. B. Fisk, Inc., Fisk's organ building company
- Charles Joseph Fisk (1862–1932), American judge

== See also ==
- Charles Fiske (1868–1942), American bishop
- Fisk (surname)
