= Fisk (surname) =

Fisk is an English surname. Notable people with the surname include:

- Carlton Fisk (born 1947), American baseball player
- Charles Brenton Fisk (1925–1983), American organ builder
  - C. B. Fisk, Inc., the company he founded
- Eliot Fisk (born 1954), American classical guitarist
- Elizabeth Hubbell Fisk (1859–1927), American textile artist
- Eric Fisk (born 1931), English cricketer and Royal Air Force officer
- Erma Johnson Fisk (1905–1990), American nature writer and ornithologist
- Ernest Fisk (1886–1965), English Australian radio pioneer, entrepreneur, and businessman
- Fidelia Fisk (sometimes spelled Fiske; 1816–1864), American Congregationalist missionary
- Greenleaf Fisk (known as the "Father of Brownwood, Texas"; 1807–1888), American pioneer and politician
- Greg Fisk (1945–2015), American politician and fisheries consultant; mayor of Juneau, Alaska
- Jack Fisk (born 1946), American film production designer and director
- James Fisk (financier) (known as "Diamond Jim"; 1834–1872), American stockbroker and railroad executive
- James Brown Fisk (1910–1981), American physicist
- Jason Fisk (born 1972), American football player
- Jonathan Fisk (1778–1832), American lawyer and politician; US House Representative for New York
- Katherine Fisk (1860s–1926), American contralto singer and actor
- Martin Fisk (born 1946), British actor
- M. H. Fisk (1843–1906), Wisconsin physician and pioneer
- Molly Fisk (born 1955), American poet and radio commentator
- Nicholas Fisk (pseudonym of David Higginbottom; 1923–2016), British science fiction author
- Pauline Fisk (1948–2015), British children's author
- Pliny Fisk (1792–1825), American Congregationalist missionary
- Pliny Fisk III (born 1944), American architect
- Robert Fisk (1946–2020), British journalist and author
- Sari Fisk (born 1971), Finnish Olympic bronze medalist in women's ice hockey
- Schuyler Fisk (born 1982), American actress and singer
- Steve Fisk (born ?), audio engineer, record producer, and musician
- Steven Fisk (born 1997), American golfer
- Tucker Fisk (born 1999), American football player
- Wilbur Fisk, (1792–1839), American Methodist minister, educator, and theologian
- Zachary Fisk (born 1941), American physicist
- Herbert Fisk Johnson III (known as "Fisk" Johnson; born 1958), American business executive

Fictional characters:

- Helen Tudor-Fisk, the titular character of Australian comedy sitcom Fisk
- Richard Fisk, anti-hero from the Marvel Universe
- Vanessa Fisk, non-villainous wife of Wilson "Kingpin" Fisk
- Wilson Fisk (known as "Kingpin"), supervillain from the Marvel Universe; husband of Vanessa Fisk
