= Rose (Marvel Comics) =

- Cover of The Amazing Spider-Man #253 (Jun 1984). Art by Rick Leonardi.

Publication information
- Publisher: Marvel Comics
- First appearance: The Amazing Spider-Man #253 (Jun 1984)
- Created by: Tom DeFalco

In-story information
- Alter ego: Richard Fisk; Sergeant Blume; Jacob Conover; Philip Hayes
- Species: Human

The Rose is an alias used by several fictional characters appearing in American comic books published by Marvel Comics. The original Rose first appeared in The Amazing Spider-Man #253 (June 1984), and was created by writer Tom DeFalco.

== Publication history ==
Tom DeFalco recounted:

When I created the Rose, I wanted a character in middle management. We had all the big crimelords, and then the second-tier crimelords, and this guy was supposed to be second-tier. He doesn't fight, he hires people to do the fighting. I put him in a mask to make him distinctive. It was not a plan that he would have a secret identity. But at some point later on, I was reading something about the big mystery of "Who is the Rose?" I didn't realize there was a mystery! So I realized I'd have to come up with something for the Rose, and I figured I'd use Roderick Kingsley, because we'd already eliminated him as the Hobgoblin but he fit perfectly as the Rose.

DeFalco was fired from The Amazing Spider-Man by editor Jim Owsley before he could reveal the Rose's identity. A subsequent issue of Web of Spider-Man, written by Owsley, revealed the Rose to be Richard Fisk.

== Fictional character biography ==
The character of Rose is depicted as a well-dressed, calm, calculating and gentleman-like crime lord who favors roses and wears a leather, lilac-colored mask.

=== Richard Fisk ===
The first version of Rose was Richard Fisk, the son of Wilson Fisk, who sought to overthrow his father after learning the latter was the Kingpin of Crime. He later became a Punisher-like vigilante, calling himself Blood Rose. He was eventually shot dead by his own mother Vanessa Fisk. However, he is later brought back by his father using the tablet of life.

=== Sergeant Blume ===
The second version of Rose was Sergeant Blume (first name unrevealed), a police officer seeking revenge on the Kingpin for the death of his brother, another policeman. While Blume allied himself with Richard in hopes of doing good by breaking the Kingpin's hold on the city, he ended up implicated in several crimes while in the Kingpin's service. He ultimately was shot and killed in a confrontation with Richard's men in the Catskills after he had kidnapped Peter Parker's Aunt May and wife Mary Jane Watson, mistakenly thinking that Peter had discovered information that would blow the lid off of the Kingpin's organization, thus revealing Blume as a double agent.

=== Jacob Conover ===
The third version of Rose was Jacob Conover, a reporter at the Daily Bugle, who took up the Rose identity as payment for saving the life of crime lord Don Fortunato many years earlier. He was loyal solely to Fortunato, as the Kingpin had not returned to power at the time, and his principal enforcer was the cyborg powerhouse known as Delilah. Conover faced a repeated threat to his territory from the Argentinian crime lord known as the Black Tarantula, eventually being present without his Rose disguise when the Tarantula launched a direct assault on Fortunato's home. Preparing to gun down the Tarantula and a roomful of witnesses, Conover was stopped by Spider-Man and carted off to jail.

=== Phillip Hayes ===
The fourth version of Rose was Dr. Phillip Hayes. He took up the Rose persona after he lost his funding in gene-therapy research after an accident in the Phelcorps laboratory, a result of which was the new heroine Jackpot. He deals in "Ebony" shipments, a synthesized drug created from Corruptor's sweat glands. He managed to slip under the superhero radar for a while, but Jackpot was getting closer to discovering his involvement. After he discovered the secret identity of his opponent (through a coincidence resulting from being Sara Ehret's co-worker), he hires Boomerang to track Sara down at her house and murders her husband in front of her and her daughter. He is later arrested and unmasked, much to Sara's shock.

== Powers and abilities ==
The various interactions of Rose have no superhuman powers. Richard Fisk is trained in the use of guns and has some martial-arts training; Sergeant Blume is a trained police officer; and Jacob Conover is trained in the use of firearms and has a number of criminal contacts. These versions of Rose always carry a handgun and often a variety of mini-grenades.

== Reception ==
- In 2022, Screen Rant included The Rose in their "10 Spider-Man Villains That Are Smarter Than They Seem" list.

== Other versions ==
An Ultimate Marvel equivalent of Rose is a maskless associate of the Kingpin. He was present in the Ultimate Knights storyline where he auditioned Ronin to be a part of the Kingpin's organization and was ordered by the Kingpin to blow up Midtown High, but was arrested by the cops.

In Marvel Adventures continuity, the Rose is a criminal with enough financial resources to bid a fortune on highly sophisticated battlesuits.
