= Samuel Silke =

Sammy Silke
- Samuel Silke as depicted in Daredevil vol. 2 #27 (January 2002). Art by Alex Maleev.

Publication information
- Publisher: Marvel Comics
- First appearance: Daredevil vol. 2 #26 (December 2001)
- Created by: Brian Michael Bendis (writer); Alex Maleev (artist)

In-story information
- Full name: Samuel Silke
- Supporting character of: Daredevil

Samuel "Sammy" Silke is a fictional character appearing in American comic books published by Marvel Comics. The character debuted in the comic series Daredevil. The character is depicted as the son of one of the antagonist Kingpin's friends and associates. His appearance is based on artist Alex Maleev.

In other media, Silke has appeared in the Marvel Cinematic Universe series Daredevil, portrayed by Peter Gerety.

== Publication history ==
Samuel Silke first appeared in Daredevil Vol. 2 #26 and was created by Brian Michael Bendis and Alex Maleev.

== Fictional character biography ==
As a child, Samuel Silke was close friends with Richard Fisk, son of the Kingpin, Wilson Fisk. The two discovered that their fathers worked for the Mafia, but it was only when Richard was a young adult that he learned his father was the Kingpin. Following some serious, unknown error in Chicago, Silke was allowed by the organization to join the crew of the then-blind Kingpin as a favor to his father. Years later, Matt Murdock was giving Silke's father's organization problems, so Silke asked Fisk to take care of it for him. Fisk denied the request, saying Murdock was not to be touched and refused to elaborate any further. This angered Silke immensely. Richard Fisk revealed to Silke that he and the rest of the Kingpin's crew knew that the Kingpin knew that Murdock was in fact Daredevil. Silke orchestrated a coup with Richard Fisk, going against the Kingpin's rule by ordering an assassination attempt on Murdock in the Kingpin's name.

The climax of Silke's plan came was when he and the rest of Kingpin's men orchestrated a Julius Caesar-like attack on Kingpin, stabbing him several times and leaving him for dead. With Kingpin out of the way, Silke planned on uniting and running New York's underworld.

However, Silke bit off more than he could chew. Kingpin survived the assassination attempt and was carried out of the country by Vanessa Fisk, his wife. Vanessa then got back at Silke's men, having them killed and killing Richard herself.

Silke fled to the FBI, begging for protection. He would not give any info on his father, but he did give the one thing he had - Daredevil's identity. One of the FBI agents he told it to would later sell it to the tabloids, effectively destroying Daredevil's life.

Silke was brought to a minimum-security prison a bitter and sullen man, bemoaning to the other convicts about how he almost had everything at his fingertips. He was later told by a guard that his father had come to visit him. But when Silke got there, someone else was waiting for him: the Kingpin, who killed him by crushing his head to a pulp, finally getting his revenge.

== Powers and abilities ==
Silke was proficient in the knowledge and usage of various knives and guns.

== In other media ==
Samuel Silke appears in Daredevil, portrayed by Peter Gerety. This version is Roscoe Sweeney's right-hand man and responsible for Jack Murdock's death.
