= Molly Fisk =

American poet and radio commentator

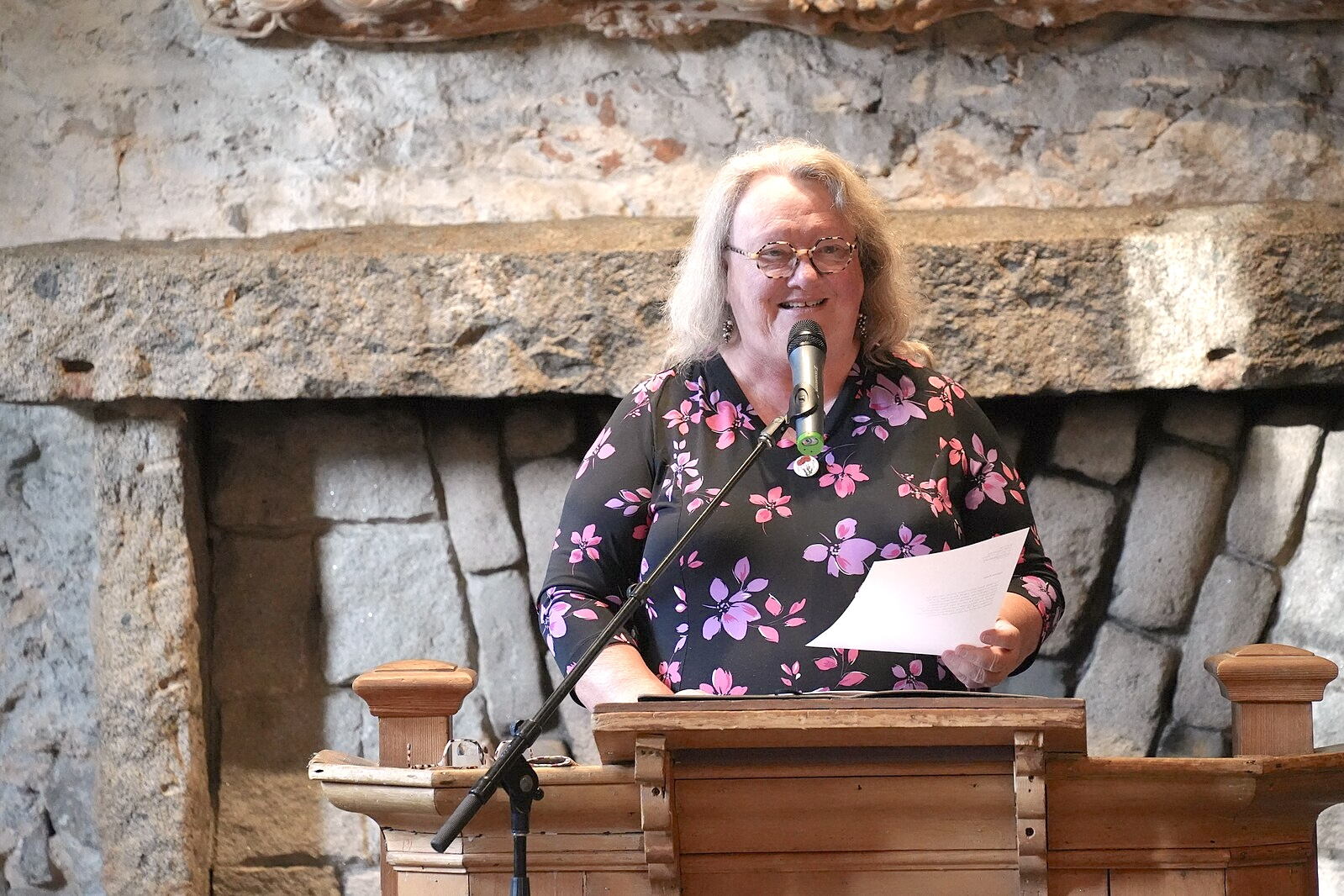
Molly Fisk at Sierra Poetry Festival 2025

Molly Fisk (born July 16, 1955) is an American poet and radio commentator. Her most recent book is Walking Wheel from Red Hen Press. She was honored as an Academy of American Poets Laureate Fellow in 2019.

== Biography ==
Mary (nickname, "Molly") Elizabeth Fisk was born July 16, 1955. Originally from San Francisco, Fisk earned her B.A. cum laude from Radcliffe College/ Harvard University in Folklore & Mythology, her M.B.A. with honors from Simmons College Graduate School of Management, and after working as a sweater designer/manufacturer (Northern Lights) and a Fortune-1000 lender (First National Bank of Chicago) began writing at the age of 35. Her previous work consists of the poetry collections The More Difficult Beauty (Hip Pocket Press, 2010), Listening to Winter (Roundhouse Press/Heyday Books, 2000), Terrain (with Dan Bellm and Forrest Hamer, Hip Pocket Press, 1998), and the letterpress chapbook Salt Water Poems (Jungle Garden Press, 1994), the essay collections Everything But the Kitchen Skunk; Naming Your Teeth; Houston, We Have a Possum; Using Your Turn Signal Promotes World Peace; and Blow-Drying a Chicken (all Story Street Press).

Fisk has received fellowships from the National Endowment for the Arts, the California Arts Council, and the Marin Arts Council. Her prizes include the Dogwood Prize, the Robinson Jeffers Tor House Prize in Poetry, the National Writers Union Prize, and a grant from the Corporation for Public Broadcasting. She serves as Poet Laureate of Nevada County, California (2017–2019), Hell's Backbone Grill in Boulder, Utah, radio station KVMR-FM, Nevada City, California, and has appeared at TEDxSanFrancisco and TEDxGrassValley.

Fisk's radio commentary is heard weekly on the News Hour of KVMR-FM (Fridays, 8:06 a.m. Pacific Time).

Fisk teaches creative writing classes on-line and works privately as a Life Coach in the Skills for Change tradition. She has taught Writing to Heal, a technique that boosts the immune system, to cancer patients at Sierra Nevada Memorial Hospital since 2000. She taught creative writing at U.C. Davis Extension from 1997 to 2003, and edited The Healing Woman, a newsletter for childhood sexual abuse survivors, from 1997 to 2000. She taught with California Poets in the Schools from 1993 to 2006, editing three of their statewide anthologies.

Fisk is the niece by marriage of the American novelist John Updike. Her mother Antoinette Pennington Fisk (1932–2000) was the sister of Updike's first wife, Mary Pennington Updike Weatherall. She is the daughter of Irving Lester Fisk, II (1928–1984) and the granddaughter of ornithologist Erma Johnson Fisk, U.S. Assistant Secretary of Commerce (1957–1961) Bradley Fisk, Unitarian minister Leslie Talbot Pennington, and Elizabeth Daniels Pennington. Fisk's maternal great-grandfather, William Colet Johnson, helped to found Paul Revere Insurance. She dated playwright Oakley Hall III in the 2000s; her poem A Theatrical Death is dedicated to him.

== Awards and honors ==
- 2019, Academy of American Poets Poet Laureate Fellow
- 2017, Inaugural Poet Laureate of Nevada County, CA
- 2010, Corporation for Public Broadcasting Grant, KVMR-FM
- 2007, Dogwood Prize (for "Washington Square — New York, 1941")
- 2005, Robinson Jeffers Tor House Prize (for "Little Songs for Antoinette")
- 1999, Fellowship from the National Endowment for the Arts
- 1997, Artists Fellowship in Poetry from the California Arts Council
- 1996, Billee Murray Denny Prize (for "The Dry Tortugas")
- 1995, Individual Artists Grant in Poetry from the Marin Arts Council
- 1992, National Writers Union, Santa Cruz/Monterey Local 7 Prize (for "Veterans")

== Works ==
Non-Fiction

- Everything But the Kitchen Skunk (Story Street Press, 2022)
- Naming Your Teeth (Story Street Press, 2018)
- Houston, We Have a Possum (Story Street Press, 2016),
- Using Your Turn Signal Promotes World Peace (Story Street Press, 2015)
- Blow-Drying a Chicken: Observations from a Working Poet (Story Street Press, 2013)

Poetry

- Walking Wheel (Red Hen Press, 2026
- The More Difficult Beauty (Hip Pocket Press, 2010)
- Listening to Winter, #4 in the California Poetry Series (Roundhouse/Heyday Books, 2000)
- Terrain, a collaborative chapbook with Dan Bellm and Forrest Hamer (Hip Pocket Press,1998)
- Salt Water Poems (Jungle Garden Press, 1994)
- Surrender (audio-tape, 1994)

Commentary

- Blow-Drying a Chicken (CD-KVMR, 2008)
- Using Your Turn Signal Promotes World Peace (CD-KVMR, 2005)

Editor

- 2020, California Fire & Water: A Climate Crisis Anthology, Story Street Press
- 2007, Open to All, Nevada County Library, with Steve Sanfield and Steve Fjeldsted
- 2001, California Poets in the Schools Statewide Anthology: Heart Flip
- 2000, California Poets in the Schools Statewide Anthology: 100 Parades
- 1997, California Poets in the Schools Statewide Anthology: Belonging to California

In other media

- Fisk appeared in the award-winning PBS documentary The Loss of Nameless Things in 2005.
