= Laxfield =

Coordinates: 52.3°N 1.367°E

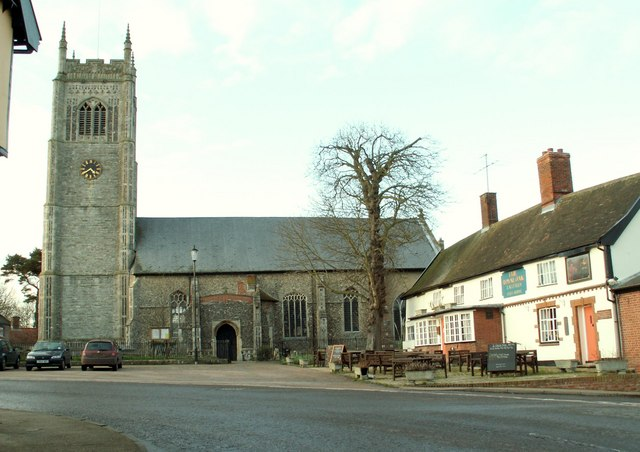
- Church of All Saints

- Location within Suffolk
- District: Mid Suffolk
- Shire county: Suffolk
- Region: East
- Country: England
- Sovereign state: United Kingdom
- Post town: WOODBRIDGE
- Postcode district: IP13
- Dialling code: 01986
- UK Parliament: Waveney Valley

Laxfield is a small ancient village in northern Suffolk, England. It is located at a distinct bend in today's B1117 road.

== History ==
Laxfield is believed to date from Saxon times as it is known that an early church was there, and the village itself appears in the Domesday Book of 1086. In 1226 Laxfield was given a charter to hold a market and Saturday was selected.

All Saints’ Church in Laxfield is largely of 14th-century construction, and was essentially complete by 1488.

The village and the surrounding area, like much of East Anglia, was a hotbed of Puritan sentiment during much of the 17th century. Being the birthplace of the iconoclast William Dowsing as well as the home of many of his kin, it was natural enough that Laxfield became a puritan parish. By the mid-1630s, the Fiske family and others had departed for the Massachusetts Bay Colony as part of the wave of emigration that occurred during the Puritan Migration to New England.

Laxfield was the final station on the Mid-Suffolk Light Railway, which ran from the Great Eastern Railway line at Haughley. The railway opened in 1904 and eventually closed in 1952. Eventually the line reached Cratfield.

== Laxfield today ==
The Village has local amenities such as a village shop (currently run by the Manchester Co-operative Society) and a primary school. It is home to All Saints' Church, the Royal Oak Pub, and the Kings Head Pub (known as the Low House). Laxfield has one of the biggest communal playing fields in Suffolk, at almost eight acres, which has a large children's play area and a bowls green. There is also a newly refurbished village hall at the centre of the village as well as a small museum in the Guildhall (ca. 1520). This building housed a doctor's surgery from the 1930s until it closed in 2018. The museum, open during the afternoon on summer weekends, has now taken over this space as an additional display area and a new office.

There is a friendly Produce, Craft and Flea market from 10am until 12.30pm on the first Saturday of each month. Over 20 stalls in and around All Saints’ Church and the Royal Oak offer a wide and ever-changing range of products including local foods, crafts, plants, books and collectibles.

The King's Head Pub, known locally as 'The Low House' due to its position below the church and the village centre, is unusual as it lacks a bar. Beverages are served from the pub's traditional tap room at the back.

There is a Baptist church in the centre of the village, with services every Sunday, both morning and evening. The church holds various activities for all age groups, weekly and throughout the year. On the front wall of the chapel there is a plaque commemorating the burning at the stake of John Noyes in the village on 22 September 1557.
