= Hell's Backbone Grill =

Coordinates: 37°54′8.842″N 111°25′26.097″W

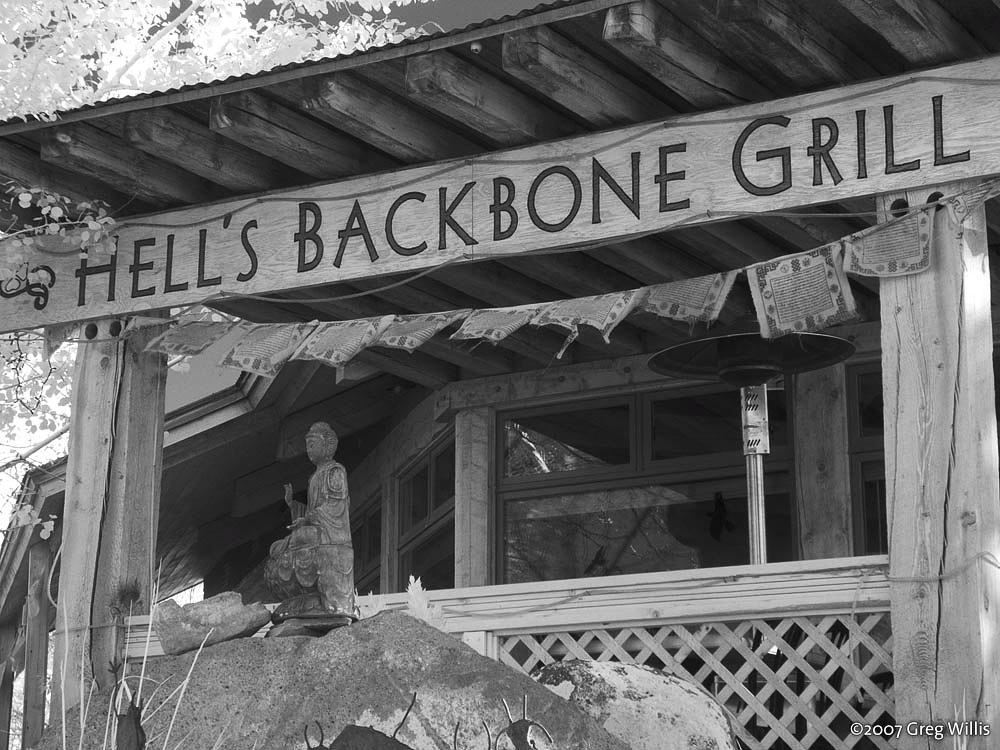
Hell's Backbone Grill in Boulder, Utah.

Hell's Backbone Grill is a restaurant located in Boulder, Utah near the Grand Staircase–Escalante National Monument. The restaurant serves a style of "Four Corners Cuisine": an updated combination of cowboy classics, Mormon recipes, and traditional Southwestern fare.

Hell's Backbone Grill espouses the values of farm-to-table and local food. The restaurant is supplied by the Hell's Backbone Farm, an organic farm which provides over 20,000 pounds of produce annually; other ingredients are obtained locally.

Despite the remote location, Hell's Backbone Grill has been Zagat rated, receiving a score of 26 for food.

It has received press coverage for both its improbable success and its owners' outspoken opposition to the shrinking of the Grand Staircase National Monument.

In 2020, the James Beard Foundation nominated Hell's Backbone for Best Chef in the Mountain region. The Foundation recognized the restaurant again in March 2022 with their most prestigious nomination to date. Their selection in the Outstanding Restaurant category was a first for any Utah restaurant in the history of the awards.
