= Amos Kidder Fiske =

US lawyer, journalist, & author (1842–1921)

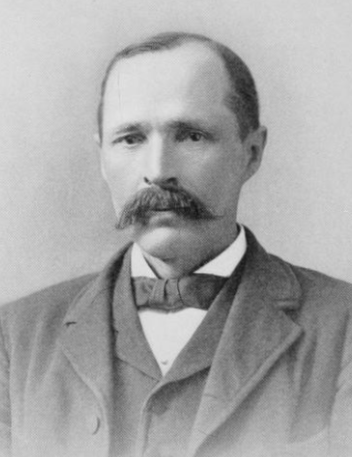
Fiske c. 1900

Amos Kidder Fiske (May 12, 1842 – September 18, 1921) was an American lawyer, journalist, and the author of several books. He was an editorial writer for The New York Times for 22 years.

== Biography ==
Amos Kidder Fiske was born in Whitefield on May 12, 1842. During his childhood in New Hampshire, he worked both on his parents' farm and in a nearby village as a factory hand at a cotton-mill. Orphaned at age sixteen, he continued his employment at the cotton-mill and saved enough money for his further education. After secondary education at Appleton Academy in New Ipswich, New Hampshire, he matriculated in 1862 at Harvard University, where he worked part-time to support himself. At Harvard, Fiske graduated with an A.B. in 1866. After graduation he went to New York City, where he taught school for the academic year 1866–1867 and then studied law for a year. One of the lawyers at the law office where he studied was George Ticknor Curtis. Fiske helped Curtis considerably in writing Curtis's biography of Daniel Webster, but was not mentioned in the biography's preface. Fiske was admitted to the New York state bar in 1868.

Fiske returned in 1868 to Cambridge and graduated in 1869 with an A.M. from Harvard. In Cambridge, Massachusetts, on October 27, 1870, he married Caroline Child (1837–1915), sister of Francis James Child.

Amos Fiske preferred journalism to the practice of law. He started as a reporter and worked his way to promotions as night copy editor, book reviewer, and, finally, to editorial writer. He was employed on the staff of the New York Times from 1869 to 1871 and from 1878 to 1897. He was an editor for the Boston Globe from 1874 to 1877. From 1900 to 1902 he was employed by New York's The Mail and Express. From 1902 to 1919 he was an associate editor for the Journal of Commerce and Commercial Bulletin. He made many contributions to the American Cyclopædia and the Annual Cyclopedia, as well as occasional contributions to Harper's Weekly.

He was a member of the Century Association, where he enjoyed the reading room and playing pool.

Amos and Caroline Fiske had a son and two daughters. Their son, Philip Sidney Fiske (1872–1928), was educated at Harvard. Their two daughters were educated at Radcliffe.

Amos Kidder Fiske died at his daughters' residence in Cambridge, Massachusetts on September 18, 1921.

== Selected publications ==
=== Articles ===
- Fiske, A. K. (1879). "Recent History and Biography". The North American Review. 129 (275): 404–411. JSTOR 25100803.
- —— (1880). "Profligacy in Fiction". The North American Review. 131 (284): 79–88. JSTOR 25100875.
- —— (1899). "Some Consecrated Fallacies". The North American Review. 169 (517): 821–828. JSTOR 25104915.
- —— (1912). "The Mythical Element in Christianity". The Open Court. XXVI: 48–60.
- —— (1912). "Literary Genius of Ancient Israel". The Open Court. XXVI: 654–661.

=== Books ===
- Fiske, Amos Kidder; Downer, W. H. (1877). My Mother-in-law. Boston: Lockwood, Brooks, and Company.
- —— (1890). Midnight talks at the club. New York: Fords, Howard, & Hulbert.
- —— (1891). Beyond the Bourn: Reports of a Traveller Returned from "The Undiscovered Country,". New York: Fords, Howard, & Hulbert.
- —— (1896). Jewish Scriptures; the books of the Old Testament in the light of their origin and history. New York: Scribner.
- —— (1897). The Myths of Israel: The Ancient Book of Genesis with Analysis and Explanation of Its Composition. Macmillan.
- —— (1898). Story of the Philippines: a popular account of the islands from their discovery by Magellan to the capture by Dewey. New York.
- —— (1899). The West Indies: A History of the Islands of the West Indian Archipelago, Together with an Account of Their Physical Characteristics, Natural Resources, and Present Condition. G. P. Putnam's Sons.
- —— (1904). The Modern Bank: A Description of Its Functions and Methods and a Brief Account of the Development and Present Systems of Banking. D. Appleton.
- —— (1911). The Great Epic of Israel: The Web of Myth, Legend, History, Law, Oracle, Wisdom and Poetry of the Ancient Hebrews. New York: Sturgis & Walton Company. ISBN 9780524047958.
- —— (1914). Honest business; right conduct for organisations of capital and of labour. New York and London: G. P. Putnam's Sons.
