= Erma Johnson Fisk =

Nature writer

- Born: Erma Johnson; 5 August 1905
- Died: 11 January 1990 (aged 84)
- Other name: "Jonnie" Fisk
- Education: Vassar College
- Occupations: Nature writer and amateur ornithologist
- Spouse: Bradley Fisk
- Children: Three

Erma Johnson "Jonnie" Fisk (5 August 1905 – 11 January 1990) was a nature writer and amateur ornithologist, noted for her study of the least tern.

== Biography ==
Erma Johnson graduated from Vassar College, where she participated in track and field as a long jumper. On August 7, 1926, she married the wealthy financier Bradley Fisk, lived in Buffalo, New York, and became the mother of three children. When Bradley Fisk was United States Assistant Secretary of Commerce from 1957 to 1961 in the Eisenhower administration, Erma J. Fisk was a hostess in Washington D.C.

After she was widowed at age 55, she became a full-time field naturalist and assisted ornithologists in various parts of the Western Hemisphere. When Fisk was 73, she briefly worked with the Nature Conservancy in Baboquivari Peak, Arizona.

At the age of 75, she began writing books and soon became a literary celebrity. She traveled the lecture circuit in her Volkswagen Rabbit to visit colleges and attend signings at bookstores and women's clubs.

In 1952, the Fisks first visited Guana Island in the British Virgin Islands and had a cottage built there. In 1952, Jonnie Fisk started sending ornithological reports from Guana Island to the ornithologist James Bond in Philadelphia.

== Family ==
The three children of Bradley and Erma Fisk were Bradley Jr. (1927–1997), Irving Lester (1928–1984), and Amanda (born 1936). The poet and radio personality Molly Fisk is a granddaughter of Erma J. Fisk.

== Selected books ==
- The Peacocks of Baboquivari. 1983.
- Parrots' Wood. 1985.
- A Birdwatcher's Cookbook. 1987.
- A Cape Cod Journal. 1990.
