= Richard S. Fiske =

American volcanologist (1932–2025)

Richard Sewell Fiske (September 5, 1932 – June 18, 2025; also known as Dick Fiske) was an American volcanologist and paleontologist. From 1980 to 1985, he was Director of the National Museum of Natural History.

== Early life and education ==
Fiske was born in 1932 and raised in Baltimore, where he attended the Baltimore Friends School. He later went to Princeton University, where he attained a BSE and MSE degree in geological engineering, and Johns Hopkins University, from which he received a Ph.D. in geology in 1960.

The fieldwork for his doctorate was completed at the University of Tokyo, though he also worked on a mapping project at Mount Rainier in Washington. Fiske returned to the university from 1960 to 1961 as a postdoctoral fellow supported by the American Chemical Society, and spent an additional two postdoctoral years back at Johns Hopkins.

== Career ==
From 1963 to 1976, Fiske was a geologist for the U.S. Geological Survey. During the period 1965 to 1968, he was posted at the Hawaiian Volcano Observatory. His research with the survey focused on Hawaii and the Sierra Nevada. In Hawaii, he established measurement stations to record the movement of faults at Kīlauea, some of which were still in use at the time of his death.

Fiske began working at the Smithsonian Institution in 1976 as a volcanologist in their Department of Mineral Sciences. There, he researched undersea volcanoes near Japan, using submersibles to explore submarine craters. In January 1980, Fiske was named Director of the Smithsonian's National Museum of Natural History. In 1985, he resigned his position and returned to research with the Department of Mineral Sciences.

Fiske was awarded the 2000 Distinguished Public Service Medal of the Mineralogical Society of America. The American Geological Institute awarded him in 2003 their Award for Outstanding Contribution to Public Understanding of the Geosciences. He retired in 2006.

== Personal life ==
While a graduate student at Johns Hopkins, Fiske became acquainted with Patricia Leach, whom he married in 1959. She was also a museum director, as she headed the Textile Museum from 1982 through 1986. Their son, Peter, was born c. 1966, and their daughter, Anne, c. 1963.

Dick Fiske died in from pneumonia in Seattle in 2025. He was 92 years old.
