= Justice Fisk =

Justice Fisk may refer to:

- Charles Joseph Fisk (1862–1932), associate justice of the North Dakota Supreme Court
- Isaac Fiske (1757–1824), associate justice of the Rhode Island Supreme Court
- James Fisk (politician) (1763–1844), associate justice of the Vermont Supreme Court
