= Fisker =

Fisker may refer to:

== People ==
- Fisker (surname), including a list of people with that name
- Henrik Fisker, a Danish-born car designer and businessman based in Los Angeles, California, US

== Companies ==
- Fisker Coachbuild (founded 2005), a car design firm based in Orange County, California, US
  - Fisker Automotive (2007–2014), a car company, based in Irvine, California, US, formed from a merger of Fisker Coachbuild and Quantum Technologies
    - Karma Automotive (founded 2014), a Chinese owned car company based in Irvine, California, US, formed from the assets of Fisker Automotive
- Fisker Inc. (founded 2016), a car company, based in Los Angeles, California, US, founded by Henrik Fisker

== Other uses ==
- Fisker Karma (production 2011-2012), a luxury plug-in hybrid sports sedan produced by Fisker Automotive

== See also ==
- Benetti Fisker 50, the "Fisker 50", a superyacht designed by Henrik Fisker and built by Benetti
- VLF Automotive (Villarreal-Lutz-Fisker Automotive), a car company founded in 2012.
