= Richard Fisk =

- Richard Fisk as depicted in Web of Spider-Man #30 (September 1987). Art by Steve Geiger.

Publication information
- Publisher: Marvel Comics
- First appearance: The Amazing Spider-Man #83 (April 1970)
- Created by: Stan Lee (writer); John Romita Sr. (artist)

In-story information
- Alter ego: Richard Fisk
- Species: Human
- Team affiliations: Hydra
- Notable aliases: The Schemer, Rose, Blood Rose
- Abilities: Martial artist High-level intellect Carries a handgun and a variety of mini-grenades As Rose: Wears a bulletproof suit

Richard Fisk is a character appearing in American comic books published by Marvel Comics. The character first appeared in The Amazing Spider-Man #83 (April 1970) and was created by Stan Lee and John Romita Sr. He is the son of Wilson and Vanessa Fisk. Although originally portrayed as a villain, he later became an antihero.

Richard Fisk appeared in Spider-Man: The Animated Series, voiced by Nick Jameson, and made a cameo appearance in Spider-Man: Into the Spider-Verse.

== Publication history ==
The character Richard Fisk first appears as The Schemer in The Amazing Spider-Man #83 (April 1970), created by Stan Lee and John Romita Sr. He first appeared as Rose in The Amazing Spider-Man #253 (June 1984), but was not revealed as Rose until The Amazing Spider-Man #286 (March 1987).

== Fictional character biography ==
Richard Fisk grew up as a child of privilege, believing that his father Wilson Fisk was a respectable and honorable businessman. Wilson was sometimes abusive to Richard, but Richard still loved him. At one point he and his childhood friend Samuel Silke saw Wilson roughing up someone. It was when he was attending a prestigious college in Switzerland that he discovered that his father was the Kingpin. Realizing the luxuries of his youth had been financed by a criminal empire, Richard was distraught and vowed to make atonement for his father's crimes. When his parents received word that Richard had perished in a skiing accident, they suspected that it was really a suicide after Richard learned the truth of his father's identity. Heartbroken and furious that his son could have acted so spinelessly, the Kingpin sunk into a spell of depression.

=== Operating as Schemer ===
Cover of The Amazing Spider-Man #83. Art by John Romita Sr.

Not long afterward, a new gang emerges in New York, led by a mysterious figure calling himself the Schemer. Unlike most gangs in New York, the Schemer's organization is bent solely on dismantling the Kingpin's empire. After a series of confrontations, the Kingpin and the Schemer finally meet face to face, and the Schemer reveals himself to be Richard Fisk. Richard explains that he had faked his death in the Alps and was striking back at his father using his own money. This final shock is too much for the Kingpin to bear, leaving him catatonic. Richard realizes how much he had hurt his father, and he set off to find a way to cure his comatose state. Richard joined the international terrorist group Hydra, becoming a leader of the Nevada fragment of Hydra and eventually rising to the rank of Supreme Hydra. Now with Hydra's expansive resources at his disposal, Richard returns his father to full health. The Kingpin, reconciled with his son, proved that he was back to normal by clandestinely taking over as ruler of Hydra. However, it was soon revealed that the true leader of Hydra was the Red Skull, and the Fisks are forced to work with Captain America and the Falcon to stop him.

=== Operating as Rose ===
Several years later, Richard joins his father's organization, calling himself Rose, a crime lord under the Kingpin's control. However, this was all a ruse to undermine the Kingpin's empire from within. However, Rose's subterfuge results in an explosive gang war in New York City. During a shoot-out, Richard kills a police officer, an act that became a turning point for him - no longer could he consider himself morally superior to his father. Richard and his friend Alfredo Morelli plot to make the Kingpin think that Richard was ready to inherit his father's position. Alfredo undergoes plastic surgery to make himself look just like Richard and begins climbing the ladder of power. However, when the Kingpin is overthrown by the combined forces of Daredevil and Hydra, Alfredo betrays Richard and takes over as the new Kingpin. Richard then becomes Blood Rose, a Punisher-like vigilante, and begins killing criminals in a bloody purge of the city. After being caught by Spider-Man and arrested, Richard enters the Witness Protection Program.

Years later, Wilson Fisk once again regains the mantle of the Kingpin. Richard works with Samuel Silke in an attempt to kill the Kingpin, but only manage to wound him. Richard's mother Vanessa stops the rebellion and sells her husband's territory so he can travel to Europe and recover. Richard corners Vanessa, who shoots and kills him.

During the "Dead No More: The Clone Conspiracy" storyline, Richard Fisk is among those revived in a cloned body by Ben Reilly's Jackal alias. He later dies from clone degeneration when the Carrion virus was unleashed.

After Wilson Fisk becomes the mayor of New York, he obtains the Tablet of Life and Destiny and the Tablet of Death and Entropy and uses them to resurrect Richard Fisk, who reassumes the Rose persona and later becomes an independent crime lord.

== Powers and abilities ==
Richard Fisk has no superhuman powers. However, he is trained in the use of guns and has some martial arts training. He is highly intelligent and also has a number of criminal contacts.

=== Equipment ===
As Rose, he wears a bulletproof three-piece suit. He always carries a handgun and often a variety of mini-grenades as well.

== Other versions ==
An alternate universe variant of Richard Fisk from Earth-200111 appears in the Punisher Max story arc "Kingpin". This version is a child who was killed by mob boss Rigoletto.

== In other media ==
Richard Fisk (left) and Tombstone (right) as depicted in Spider-Man: The Animated Series.

- Richard Fisk appears in Spider-Man: The Animated Series, voiced by Nick Jameson. This version is loyal to his father, Wilson Fisk / Kingpin, and heads a front company called Fisktronics.
- A young Richard Fisk briefly appears in Spider-Man: Into the Spider-Verse. This version grew up not knowing of his father's criminal activities until he and Vanessa Fisk witnessed him fighting Spider-Man. While fleeing, they were killed in a car accident, which leads to Wilson creating a Super-Collider to find alternate versions of his family throughout the multiverse.
