= Vanessa Fisk =

Marvel Comics character

- Vanessa Fisk; Art by John Romita Sr.

Publication information
- Publisher: Marvel Comics
- First appearance: The Amazing Spider-Man #70 (March 1969)
- Created by: Stan Lee (writer); John Romita Sr. (artist)

In-story information
- Full name: Vanessa Marianna Fisk
- Species: Human
- Partnerships: Wilson Fisk
- Supporting character of: Daredevil; Spider-Man
- Notable aliases: Vanessa Marianna

Vanessa Fisk (née Marianna) is a fictional character appearing in American comic books published by Marvel Comics. She is the first wife of Wilson Fisk and the mother of Richard Fisk. Despite her husband's position as the Kingpin of New York City, Vanessa herself is not portrayed as a villain and is disapproving of Wilson's criminal activities.

The character has been featured in a number of stories about the Kingpin, usually in those featuring the superheroes Daredevil or Spider-Man. She has been adapted in non-comics media, such as the Marvel Cinematic Universe (MCU) television series Daredevil (2015–2018) and Daredevil: Born Again (2025–26), in which she is portrayed by Ayelet Zurer.

== Publication history ==
Created by writer Stan Lee and artist John Romita Sr., Vanessa Fisk first appeared in The Amazing Spider-Man #70 (March 1969).

== Fictional character biography ==
Little is known about Vanessa's personal life and early years other than her maiden name "Marianna". Despite being married to Wilson Fisk, the "Kingpin" of New York's criminal underworld, she did not approve of his criminal activities. At one point their son Richard Fisk became involved in a plot to overthrow his father's criminal syndicate after discovering he was the Kingpin.

After the Kingpin has a near-death experience, Vanessa threatens to leave him within twenty-four hours. Kingpin is about to kill Spider-Man when the deadline passes, and Vanessa forces him to choose between Spider-Man's life or their life together. He chooses Vanessa and spares Spider-Man as a result.

Kingpin prepares to settle his remaining business with his fellow mobsters by cooperating with the authorities and leaving the world of crime forever. This infuriates one of Kingpin's closest advisors, Lynch, who believed that Vanessa was a liability to him. When Kingpin's former lieutenants in New York learn of his plans to sell them out in exchange for immunity, they kidnap Vanessa. Lynch fires an explosive at Vanessa in an attempt to kill her. Vanessa is buried alive, leaving her amnesiac and mentally unstable. Daredevil uses Vanessa as leverage to force Kingpin to order Randolph Cherryh, newly elected to the office of mayor, to resign and to confirm to the media that he was working with Kingpin. Vanessa, now-catatonic, is sent to a sanitarium in Europe for treatment.

Vanessa recovers from her injuries and remains in Europe. After Kingpin survives an assassination attempt, Vanessa arranges for him to be shipped out of the country to recover and makes a deal with his fellow mob bosses to divide up his recently rebuilt crime syndicate in exchange for a truce. Vanessa then murders her son Richard, who admitted to Vanessa that his motivation was to rid the family of his father.

Murdering her son had a physical toll on Vanessa, causing her to lose the will to live, which along with the injuries she sustained when she was buried alive, causes her to sustain terminal organ failure. Before dying, Vanessa fakes the death of Foggy Nelson in an attempt to provoke Matt Murdock into killing Kingpin. When that fails, Vanessa manipulated the superhero Iron Fist into posing as Daredevil, which drives Murdock to break out of prison to find Foggy's murderer.

== Other versions ==
=== Batman & Spider-Man: New Age Dawning ===
An alternate universe version of Vanessa Fisk appears in Batman & Spider-Man: New Age Dawning #1.

=== Marvel Zombies ===
An alternate universe version of Vanessa Fisk appears in Marvel Zombies 3 #2. This version was secretly kept alive by a zombified Kingpin, who is initially able to control his hunger for human flesh in her presence. After Machine Man and Jocasta destroy his clone factory, the Kingpin consumes Vanessa.

=== Punisher Max ===
An alternate universe version of Vanessa Fisk appears in Punisher Max. This version's marriage with Wilson Fisk collapsed after his takeover of the mob results in their eight-year-old son Richard being killed. Blaming Wilson for not saving him, she mounts an unsuccessful assassination attempt, only to be evicted for it. Sometime later, she falls in love with Elektra and hires her to infiltrate Wilson's operations. Following Wilson's death, Vanessa has him cremated and takes over his criminal empire before she is killed by Nick Fury.

=== Ultimate Marvel ===
An alternate universe version of Vanessa Fisk from Earth-1610 appears in Ultimate Spider-Man. This version was rendered comatose.

== In other media ==
=== Television ===
- Vanessa Fisk appears in Spider-Man, voiced by Caroline Goodall. This version goes on to divorce Wilson Fisk; unable to tolerate his criminal lifestyle.
- Vanessa Marianna, later Vanessa Marianna-Fisk, appears in television series set in the Marvel Cinematic Universe (MCU), portrayed by Ayelet Zurer. Introduced in Daredevil (2015; 2018), she returns in Daredevil: Born Again (2025–2026). When Born Again was announced in March 2023, Sandrine Holt was originally cast to replace Zurer in the role due to scheduling conflicts. However, Zurer returned following a creative overhaul of the series in late 2023.

=== Film ===
Vanessa Fisk briefly appears in Spider-Man: Into the Spider-Verse, voiced by Lake Bell. This version was unaware of her husband's criminal activities until she and Richard Fisk witnessed him fighting Spider-Man. After they flee in horror and are killed in a car accident, Wilson spearheads the creation of the "Super-Collider" to find alternate versions of his family in the multiverse.

=== Miscellaneous ===
Vanessa Fisk appears in the novel Spider-Man: Forever Young, written by Stefan Petrucha. Two years after the "Tablet" storyline, Vanessa considers using the Tablet to heal a comatose Kingpin. In return for Peter Parker's help in finding the tablet, she offers to use her family's resources to assist an ailing May Parker. Though Vanessa later abandons the idea of using the tablet after witnessing its effects on Silvermane, she honors her agreement with Peter and pays for May's medical care.
