= The Other (comic book storyline) =

Comic book story arc

- Cover of Friendly Neighborhood Spider-Man 1 (Dec 2005), art by Mike Wieringo
- Publisher: Marvel Comics
- Publication date: December 2005 – March 2006
- Genre: Superhero; Crossover
Title(s)
The Amazing Spider-Man #525–528
Friendly Neighborhood Spider-Man #1–4
Marvel Knights Spider-Man #19–22.
- Main character: Spider-Man

Creative team
- Writer: Peter David; Reginald Hudlin; J. Michael Straczynski
- Penciller: Mike Deodato; Pat Lee; Mike Wieringo
- Hardcover: ISBN 0-7851-2188-9

"The Other" is a comic book crossover story arc published by Marvel Comics from October 2005 to January 2006. It was the first Spider-Man crossover since 2001, and was published in Friendly Neighborhood Spider-Man #1–4, Marvel Knights Spider-Man #19–22 and The Amazing Spider-Man #525–528.

== Publication history ==
The storyline was divided into four months, or "acts", and each month's issues had a different cover tint. The story is in 12 parts. The first act has red tinted covers, the second has blue tinted covers, the third has gray-black covers, and the final act has orange-yellow tinted covers.

The acts are divided as follows:

- Act One, written by Peter David, is told in Friendly Neighborhood Spider-Man #1, Marvel Knights Spider-Man #19 and The Amazing Spider-Man #525.
- Act Two, written by Reginald Hudlin, is told in Friendly Neighborhood Spider-Man #2, Marvel Knights Spider-Man #20 and The Amazing Spider-Man #526.
- Act Three, written by J. Michael Straczynski, is told in Friendly Neighborhood Spider-Man #3, Marvel Knights Spider-Man #21 and The Amazing Spider-Man #527.
- Act Four/Finale is told in Friendly Neighborhood Spider-Man #4, Marvel Knights Spider-Man #22 and The Amazing Spider-Man #528; all three titles were written by their regular writers.

The books continued to be illustrated by their regular artists throughout the crossover:

- Mike Wieringo in Friendly Neighborhood Spider-Man.
- Pat Lee in Marvel Knights Spider-Man.
- Mike Deodato Jr. in The Amazing Spider-Man.

== Plot synopsis ==
The first five chapters loosely followed the Kübler-Ross model of the stages of grief.

=== Act One ===
Peter Parker (A.K.A. Spider-Man) has recently been having black outs, dizzy spells, and enigmatic dreams, which includes Morlun, Kraven the Hunter, frogs, Uncle Ben, and spidery imagery. In confronting a new villain calling himself Tracer who is robbing a bank, Spider-Man suffers a bullet wound to the shoulder. Tracer escapes, while Peter goes to see Dr. Castillo, a doctor recommended to him by Captain America, who treats Peter's wound and takes a blood test. Castillo later informs Peter that he is dying, which Peter relates to his wife, Mary Jane Watson.

Later, May Parker, who wakes up from a strange dream and, after being yelled at by an emotional Peter, goes to the kitchen and finds Tracer. Tracer tells her that he is a reserve Avenger who is there to watch over her. During their conversation, he tells May that he is a machine god; in the same way that humans created gods, machines created him. Meanwhile, Spider-Man is fighting Tracer's robot followers in the city when his powers start to fail. Morlun confronts him and tells Peter that he would rather watch Peter deteriorate than fight him. Spider-Man returns home and, finding Tracer, attacks him. However, Tracer assesses his health and refuses to fight him in his current state. Peter becomes enraged at Tracer's nonchalant attitude about his plans to kill Aunt May, and strangles Tracer to death. His skin melts away to reveal a machine body. After this, Peter tells Aunt May what is wrong with him.

=== Act Two ===
Peter goes to see Mister Fantastic, who tells him that his condition is not caused by cancer or a viral or bacterial infectious disease. He is informed by Yellowjacket that the illness was caused by a radiation-based disease. Peter goes to see Bruce Banner, an expert on radiation-based mutation, who informs him that the disease is spreading too fast to be cured. Peter then sees the Black Panther on Banner's suggestion, but he also cannot find the source of Peter's illness. Back in New York City, Peter encounters the Enforcer Ox and, thinking him to be Morlun, fights him. In his anger, Peter almost kills him before Daredevil stops him. Later, Peter goes to Doctor Strange, who tells him he cannot use his magic to cure Peter and tells Peter to prepare himself for death.

Peter, Mary Jane and Aunt May go to Latveria to use Doctor Doom's Time Machine to see past scenes in his life, like the day Richard and Mary Parker left Peter in the care of his Uncle Ben and Aunt May. After returning to Stark Tower, Peter plans a trip to Las Vegas with Mary Jane, namely in Tony Stark's penthouse suite. As he thinks of what it would be like in Las Vegas, Peter thinks about using his spider-sense to win at blackjack, in the hopes of making enough money for his family after he is gone, but of course, even Vegas would most likely be hit by super villains he would have to fight. In New York, Morlun is looking for Spider-Man (in vain) as Peter and Mary Jane are in one of Stark's space pods, looking down upon the Earth.

Later, Peter tries to clear his head with web slinging. Not expecting to be attacked, Peter is caught off-guard when Morlun attacks him. The ensuing fight sends Spider-Man flying through J. Jonah Jameson's office. Spider-Man then moves the fight away from civilians and to Empire State University, where he was bitten by the spider that gave him his powers. The fight intensifies as momentum swings from Morlun's side to Spider-Man's side. After an exhausting array of punches and kicks, Spider-Man starts to think that he has emerged victorious in a brutal fight. However, Morlun tears Spider-Man's left eye out and pummels Spider-Man, leaving him beaten and unconscious.

=== Act Three ===
Before Morlun can kill Spider-Man, the police show up and Morlun leaves Spider-Man's bloody, unconscious body, planning to finally drain his life force when the hero is alone. Paramedics take the near-dead Spider-Man to the hospital, with the Avengers and Mary Jane Watson on the way as well when they hear what happened on television, and they learn that Spider-Man's injuries are too severe. Morlun goes to the unconscious Spider-Man's hospital bed to finish him off, but MJ attempts to stop Morlun, who effortlessly throws her across the room and also breaks her arm. Peter suddenly wakes up, and using the last of his strength, the savage, animalistic spider-side of himself takes over (granting him sharp teeth and stingers in his wrists), and he attacks Morlun, pinning the villain and impaling his arms to the floor. Peter then violently bites and tears out Morlun's neck, killing him. Reverting to normal, Peter says goodbye to MJ and falls to the floor, seemingly dead. As Aunt May and Mary Jane break down over the news, Iron Man takes Spider-Man's body, so that the public will not know that Spider-Man is dead.

Spider-Man is thought to be dead, and Iron Man transports his body away from the hospital. Mary Jane, Aunt May, and Jarvis, Iron Man's butler, meet together to grieve over Spider-Man's/Peter's death. After inspecting the body, Mary Jane talks to both Captain America and Iron Man over how to divulge the secret identity of Spider-Man. Later Wolverine flirts with MJ but to no avail as Mary Jane conceives it as another one of Wolverine's attempts to seduce her into an affair; it turns out that Wolverine only did so in an attempt to deflect her mind from the loss of her husband. After being unable to sleep, Mary Jane has a conversation with another New Avengers member, Spider-Woman (Jessica Drew), who tells her that her own and Peter's powers both derived from the spider, and that she could sense when Peter was going down; this obviously is through the mystical side of their powers. Both Spider-Woman and Spider-Man got their powers via radiation involving some form of spider DNA, and thus their powers are extremely similar. In the middle of the talk, there is an audible crash from the chamber where Peter Parker's body is kept. Mary Jane and the New Avengers arrive at the scene, to find that Peter's body has been hollowed out. Judging by the amount of glass outside the window, Captain America judges that the intruder escaped but not entered through the window. Mary Jane discovers the secret: all that is left is a skin. The scene cuts to a teacher explaining about spiders to her class and how a few rare species can shed their skin and begin anew. As the class goes to leave, we see a cocoon of webbing fastened to the Brooklyn Bridge.

Several days have passed since Peter shed his skin and begins with Iron Man flying around searching for him. Under the Brooklyn Bridge, Peter sleeps inside his cocoon and has a strange dream. A voice tells him he never understood what he was, accusing him of being too scared to truly be a "Spider-Man", only focusing on the human part and neglecting the spider part. Morlun managed to kill the human part of Peter, but the spider in him survived and killed Morlun, saving them both. The voice tells him that he will only be reborn if he accepts both parts, and warns him that Peter could be reborn very differently. Peter's soul agrees and is reborn, naked but outwardly human. He goes to the Avengers Tower and swears to Mary Jane and Aunt May that he will never leave them again. Later in the night, Peter goes to the lab where his husk is and recalls the final warning of the voice: "Are you the man who dreamed of being a spider? Or the spider who dreamed of being a man? Are you the one...or are you the other?" Shaking off the warning, Peter removes the wedding ring from the husk and heads back to bed.

=== Act Four ===
Peter gets a check up from Stark. As it turns out, Peter's wounds from his old enemies have been healed, including his missing left eye, and even the tonsils he lost in fourth grade have reappeared. As Stark puts it, Peter's "odometer had been reset" (this would be the first time he had an exoskeleton processed). Before the test could continue, Aunt May stopped it and told Peter to "go play." So Peter and Mary Jane go out and swing throughout the city, talking about how they feel about the recent events that have occurred. Meanwhile, in Stark Tower, pirate spiders have started to eat Peter's old dead body. When Spider-Man returns, he finds the top of Stark Tower covered in webbing. Inside the tower, Spider-Man finds the pirate spiders with Peter's old body. Using Peter's skin as a base, they have formed a body of their own. Engaging in battle, Spider-Man finds that the stingers he used to fight Morlun appear once again, but he is confused because "Spiders do not have stingers!" Before anything else can happen, the pirate Spider punches through the walls of Stark Tower and runs off. Spider-Man chases it down, but then it heads into the sewer. It forms a cocoon in a church. Spider-Man tells the New Avengers he has no idea about it and they want to run some more tests on him.

In a subplot, Flash Thompson, awakened from a coma, attempts to get a job at the school where Peter teaches. He is missing some memories, as he still calls Peter "puny Parker" and says that he has not seen him since high school.

Peter follows the otherworldly being (who may be "The Other"), only for it to inform him that they are both parts of the same whole, that spider-based cosmic forces are vying for control of his life and that she (the being possesses recognizably female build) is his opposite. Apparently, although a spider-deity known as "The Great Weaver" (also seen and mentioned in Araña: The Heart of the Spider) thought that Spidey's death was premature and pulled him back from his fate, others disagreed – and Peter feels his life being pulled in different directions as a result, at the center of a metaphorical spider's web where he is unsure if he is the predator or the prey.

Peter is still in a state of confusion and is having some sort of an identity crisis after his rebirth. With no time to contemplate the events of days past, Spider-Man rushes to the scene of an explosion where a building was just demolished and people are trapped under the debris. Spider-Man quickly begins to "dig" into the remains of the building, and in his attempt to find survivors, he discovers that his soul was imbued new powers from the dream, including night vision, the ability to feel vibrations through his webbing, and the ability to adhere to objects via the skin on his back, allowing him to securely carry items such as the small girl he found and rescued.

Spider-Man successfully rescues a few survivors and learns that his new powers have appeared because he is now "embracing the Other." Peter then returns home to be with Mary Jane, and they watch the nightly news which portrays Spider-Man as a hero. The issue and this storyline conclude with Tony Stark beginning work on a new costume for Spider-Man.

== Variant covers ==
Each issue had a variant cover drawn by Mike Wieringo, featuring a different incarnation of Spider-Man.

- Friendly Neighborhood Spider-Man #1 – Classic outfit
- Marvel Knights Spider-Man #19 – Black, symbiote outfit
- The Amazing Spider-Man #525 – Ben Reilly as Spider-Man
- Friendly Neighborhood Spider-Man #2 – The "Amazing Bag-Man" costume, consisting of a Fantastic Four outfit with a paper bag over the head
- Marvel Knights Spider-Man #20 – The Scarlet Spider costume, as worn by Ben Reilly, and briefly by Peter Parker
- The Amazing Spider-Man #526 – The six-armed Spider-Man, from The Amazing Spider-Man #100–102
- Friendly Neighborhood Spider-Man #3 – The "Cosmic Spider-Man"/Captain Universe outfit
- Marvel Knights Spider-Man #21 – The "Spider-Armor", from Web of Spider-Man #100
- The Amazing Spider-Man #527 – Spider-Man 2099
- Friendly Neighborhood Spider-Man #4 – The outfit Peter Parker wore in Amazing Fantasy #15 when he tried out for wrestling
- Marvel Knights Spider-Man #22 – Peter Parker in street clothes, with his costume visible under his open shirt
- The Amazing Spider-Man #528 – Spider-Ham, as voted for by retailers and fans
- The Amazing Spider-Man #529's third printing featured the new "Iron Spider" costume.

== Promotional material ==
As in Da Vinci's Vitruvian Man, there is Latin written backwards on Joe Quesada's promotional image for the crossover.

When reversed and translated, it reads: "(Top, by Richard Isanove): Rest in peace / The play is over / The fat lady has sung / Death equals all things / Death is everything's final limit / Never despair! / Not all of me will die / It ain't over until it's over / Everything changes, nothing perishes / You have a big piece of spinach in your front teeth."

(Bottom, by Joe Quesada): While I breathe, I hope / Nature does nothing in vain / Look around you, remember that you are mortal / It is said that for a sick man, there is hope as long as there is life / While we have the time, let us do good / I am broken, I am not deflected / Anything said in Latin sounds profound / Get a life / How fearful is this hour / A precipice in front, wolves behind / Be patient and tough; some day this pain will be useful to you / For those in misery perhaps better things will follow / We do not fear death, but the thought of death / After the darkness, light / You're from New York, aren't you? / Royally screwed."

== Collected editions ==
Material collected	Pages	Format	Released	ISBN
Amazing Spider-Man #525–528; Friendly Neighborhood Spider-Man #1–4; Marvel Knights Spider-Man #19–22	288	Oversized HC	25 Oct 2006	978-0785121886
Amazing Spider-Man #525–528; Friendly Neighborhood Spider-Man #1–4; Marvel Knights Spider-Man #19–22	288	TPB (Red Costume)	4 Apr 2007	978-0785117650
Amazing Spider-Man #525–528; Friendly Neighborhood Spider-Man #1–4; Marvel Knights Spider-Man #19–22	288	TPB (Black costume)	4 Apr 2007	978-0785128120

== Aftermath ==
Peter David continued The Other in Friendly Neighborhood Spider-Man with the character of Miss Arrow, a nurse that attended Midtown High School and became romantically involved with Flash Thompson. Early on, David dropped hints that Arrow was not as innocent as she seemed; she had the ability to extend stingers from her wrists much like Spider-Man and to control spiders. Later on, it was revealed that she was in fact The Other from the previous storyline, and "Arrow" was a play on the word "ero", a genus of pirate spider.

== Continuity ==
Many of the new powers Peter developed during "The Other" (and the powers obtained from his incident with the Queen) have not been used or referenced in several years. His night vision and arthropod communication powers were rarely ever mentioned after the storyline in which they were introduced, and his stingers were stated to only come out during special circumstances, such as when he was confronting a magical threat. Following the One More Day storyline, he apparently lost his ability to create organic webbing, although no explanation has been given for why. He still retains his boosted levels of strength, speed, and agility, his enhanced healing factor and spider-sense, and his connection to the "Web of Life."

In the last issue of the "Spider-Island"'s last storyline, "The Other" was confirmed to still have happened in a conversation between Peter and Kaine. Kaine said that 'he died and came back with all these new powers', to which Peter responded that he had "been there."

The supernatural aspects of Kaine's revival have since been revisited in the Scarlet Spider vol 2, where Kaine sporadically uses some of his "Other"-induced powers. In the fourteenth issue, Kaine is killed by the Lobo Brothers and is visited in the afterlife by Ero, who reveals it is the Spider-God and offers to return him to life as "The Other" if he embraces the spider within him, because Peter had rejected it. Though initially resistant, Kaine soon considers that he has people to protect and accepts, restoring him to life though with a more monstrous appearance, Kaine later managed to control his new instincts and return to his human appearance.

Following the "Spider-Verse" storyline, Kaine's powers of the Other was no longer after the previous battle with Morlun and the Inheritors.

== Other versions ==
A What If? story about Spider-Man: The Other, written by Peter David (who had originally written a third of the story), was released on November 15, 2006. Diverging from Amazing Spider-Man #527 (Part 9), Spider-Man rejects the rebirth and attacks the spider that offered it to him. The Venom symbiote sensed what was happening, and left Mac Gargan to seek out Peter Parker in his cocoon under the Brooklyn Bridge. It seeks him out and takes him over, filling the gap left by an incomplete metamorphosis. The new creature calls itself "Poison" and breaks into Stark Tower and confronts Aunt May and Mary Jane. His intention is to replicate himself within Mary Jane. Wolverine and Luke Cage fight Poison and are soon defeated, but then Mary Jane convinces him to leave. Poison eventually unearths the body of Gwen Stacy and replicates, implanting the newly spawned symbiote in Gwen's body, resulting in a female Carnage lookalike.
