= Flash Thompson =

Marvel Comics fictional character

Eugene "Flash" Thompson
- Artwork of Flash Thompson for Web of Spider-Man Annual #3 (October 1987). Art by Alex Saviuk.

Publication information
- Publisher: Marvel Comics
- First appearance: As Flash Thompson: Amazing Fantasy #15 (August 1962); As Agent Venom: The Amazing Spider-Man #654 (April 2011); As Agent Anti-Venom: Amazing Spider-Man/Venom: Venom Inc. Alpha #1 (December 2017)
- Created by: Stan Lee (writer); Steve Ditko (artist)

In-story information
- Full name: Eugene "Flash" Thompson
- Species: Human cyborg
- Team affiliations: United States Army; Project Rebirth; Secret Avengers; Thunderbolts; Guardians of the Galaxy; New Warriors; S.H.I.E.L.D.; Agent of Cosmos
- Supporting character of: Spider-Man; Eddie Brock
- Notable aliases: Agent Venom; Agent Anti-Venom; Venom Space Knight; White Knight
- Abilities: Anti-Venom symbiote granting: Superhuman strength, speed, agility, durability, stamina, and reflexes; Organic webbing generation; Regenerative healing factor; Immunity to "Spider Sense"; Shapeshifting; Wall-crawling; Skilled hand-to-hand combatant; Trained marksman

Eugene "Flash" Thompson is a character appearing in American comic books published by Marvel Comics. Created by writer Stan Lee and artist Steve Ditko, the character first appeared in Amazing Fantasy #15 (August 1962).

Flash Thompson is a star high school football player, who mercilessly bullies his high school classmate Peter Parker, but greatly admires Spider-Man, an irony in which the superhero takes some gratification. In time, they become close friends in college after Flash matures and he later discovers Peter is Spider-Man. After graduation, he joins the United States Army, but becomes haunted by his combat experiences, leading to alcoholism. After losing both of his legs in the Iraq War, Flash Thompson turns into the superhero Agent Venom after being bound to the Venom symbiote, which he controls via drugs, as the protagonist of Venom and Venom: Space Knight and a member of the Guardians of the Galaxy. After nearly being killed by Red Goblin, Flash recovers using the Anti-Venom symbiote, assuming his current alias of Agent Anti-Venom.

Thompson has appeared in several other media adaptations. Notably, he was portrayed by Joe Manganiello in the Sam Raimi Spider-Man trilogy, Chris Zylka in The Amazing Spider-Man, and Tony Revolori in the Marvel Cinematic Universe.

== Publication history ==
Created by writer Stan Lee and artist Steve Ditko, Flash Thompson made his first appearance in the debut Spider-Man story in Amazing Fantasy #15 (August 1962) as one of Peter Parker's classmates. Ditko based the design of Thompson on a classmate of his who bulied other students.He was a regular character in The Amazing Spider-Man series for its first four years. In The Amazing Spider-Man #47 (April 1967) he left to serve in the Vietnam War. Though he reappeared in the comic a few times while on leave from army duty, he did not return to the regular as a regular character until issue #105 (Feb. 1972).

Though the relationship between Flash Thompson and Spider-Man's alter ego Peter Parker gradually became more cordial over the years, the major turning point towards their becoming friends was in The Amazing Spider-Man #138 (Nov. 1974), in which Thompson lets Parker room with him after all his other friends and acquaintances turned him away.

Thompson's childhood is explored in The Spectacular Spider-Man #-1 (July 1997), titled "That Thompson Boy". Writer J. M. DeMatteis commented, "Despite our human tendency to want to fit people into convenient pigeonholes, no one is any one thing all the time. The main point of 'That Thompson Boy' was to show that there were other sides to Flash, to look behind the curtain and see the vulnerability, and depth, that was there. 'Flash' is a mask. Eugene is a complex, wounded human being. I think the character's history, even going back to Stan [Lee]'s stories, is a constant battle between the two, a seeking to find balance."

The character made his first appearance as the new incarnation of Venom in The Amazing Spider-Man #654 (February 2011). A second volume of Venom started in May 2011 with Flash Thompson as the titular character. As Venom, he appeared as a regular character in the 2010–2013 Secret Avengers series, from issue #23 (April 2012) through its final issue, #37 (March 2013). As Venom, he appears in the 2012 Thunderbolts series by Daniel Way and Steve Dillon. After the Superior Spider-Man event, Agent Venom is seen in space in The Guardians of the Galaxy vol. 3, #14. He was eventually spun off into his own solo series, Venom: Space Knight, written by Robbie Thompson and drawn by Ariel Olivetti. It was canceled after 13 issues. In the premier issue of Venom volume 3, Flash Thompson is seen without the symbiote.

== Fictional character biography ==
=== High school ===
Flash Thompson as he appeared in Amazing Fantasy #15 (Aug. 1962). Art by Steve Ditko.

Eugene "Flash" Thompson is the nephew of actress Lea Thompson and a bully of high school classmate Peter Parker. Flash was physically abused by his alcoholic father Harrison Thompson, leading to Flash's own violent, bullying nature. Thompson dubs Peter with the derogatory nickname "Puny Parker" and humiliates Parker daily at school. Not knowing that Parker is Spider-Man, he forms the first "Spider-Man Fan Club" and vocally supports his idol, even criticizing and insulting J. Jonah Jameson in person for the Daily Bugle's anti-Spider-Man editorials. When Spider-Man is seen committing robberies, Flash is one of the few to stand up for him claiming that he could still be innocent. When it is revealed that Spider-Man was framed by Mysterio, Flash boasts about how he is always right. Peter, who openly states that he would not "trust [Spider-Man] any further than I can throw him", takes some secret pleasure in that Flash supported his alter-ego.

In a very early issue, Flash and Peter squared off for a boxing match in the school gym. Initially expecting an easy victory, Flash was astonished to discover that he simply could not lay a hand on Peter (due to his opponent's enhanced speed and reflexes), and a single tap from Parker's fist knocked him clear out of the ring. After this episode, Flash's bullying was restricted mostly to verbal harassment. Over the next few years, as the two became rivals for Liz Allan's affections, Flash was willing to confront Peter only when backed up by his friends. Peter began to laugh off his threats with good-natured comebacks (much to Flash's annoyance as well as bewilderment). This subtle reversal of their positions was typical of Lee-Ditko character developments in the title.

Towards the end of Ditko's run on the title, Flash was employed mainly as comic relief, more a local buffoon than a serious threat. Major changes in his personality took place subsequently to 'The Amazing Spider-Man #39, when John Romita, Sr. took over as artist for The Amazing Spider-Man. Following Romita's take in place, Flash was made into a more sympathetic character and his clean-cut image was similarly emphasized to give him an "All-American" persona.

=== College and adulthood ===
After Flash Thompson entered Empire State University, his relationship with Peter Parker became progressively less hostile. While the two still traded the occasional insult, Flash had grown to respect Peter's intelligence and was surprised by his popularity with women, particularly Gwen Stacy and Mary Jane Watson. Both Flash and Peter were friends with the wealthy Harry Osborn. Harry's presence served to defuse the tension between the former rivals.

While in university, Flash joined the United States Army and serves in the Vietnam War (although this was later retconned to unspecified overseas conflict due to Marvel's floating timeline). Unlike many students of the time, Flash was never conscripted—instead, he volunteers for service of his own free will. Although Flash was absent from the strip for months at a time, his frequent stateside visits kept him familiar with the readers. He returned from the war a decorated hero. Flash's tour of duty profoundly changed him from a reckless and immature youth to a tormented and conflicted man. Finding no comfort in his military decorations, Flash turned to alcohol for years.

While in Vietnam, Flash's unit bombed an ancient temple whose acolytes had earlier sheltered Flash when he was wounded. Flash tried and failed to stop them. When he returned to America, he dropped his antagonism toward Peter. Peter, in turn, began to respect Flash's newfound maturity and the two became close. However, Flash soon finds himself tailed by mysterious assassins, former acolytes of the temple who thought that Flash had betrayed them. Spider-Man held off the assassins long enough for Flash to explain his side of the story. Sha Shan, the leader of the assassins, forgave Flash and even dated him for a while, but left him when she found out he was cheating on her. When Sha Shan was attacked by the Hobgoblin, Flash made the mistake of insulting the villain on television. Hobgoblin took revenge by abducting Flash and framing him as Hobgoblin's true identity. Spider-Man was aghast that his old friend was a villain, but Flash was legally exonerated when Hobgoblin's true identity was revealed. It was around this period that Flash Thompson would serve as best man at the wedding of Parker and Mary Jane.

After a bout of severe depression, Flash went drunk-driving and was badly injured in a car crash. Soon afterward Norman Osborn offered him a job at Oscorp as his personal aide to annoy Peter. Not knowing the reasons behind this, Flash became loyal to Norman for giving him a second chance and turning his life around. During this time, Flash met the hero Prodigy, not realizing he was also Spider-Man in disguise. Later, as part of a plan of driving Spider-Man to murderous violence by attacking his family and friends, Osborn kidnapped Flash (under the pretense of picking him up from an Alcoholics Anonymous meeting), force-feeds him whiskey and has him crash a truck into Midtown High School, where Peter works. Flash survived, thanks to his excellent physical condition, but he suffered severe brain damage that left him in a coma. Liz, although widowed and raising her son Normie all on her own, became Flash's caretaker, and hired a full-time nurse to care for him. May Parker had come up with the idea to have Flash moved into Peter's apartment building so he could be among friends in the hopes it would aid in his recovery. Peter, blaming himself for what happened to Flash, was eager to help and started spending his free time with him, lending emotional support and companionship. Although Flash remained in a largely unresponsive state after coming out of the coma, Peter's constant companionship led to his condition slowly improving over time.

Flash awakens from his coma during "The Other" story arc. Flash takes a job as the physical education teacher at Midtown High School, where Peter teaches science. However, Flash suffers from severe memory gaps and again treats Peter like a nerd and picks on him, as he did in their high school days. Flash also flirts with Miss Arrow, unaware that she is a villain there to attack Peter. When Peter unmasks himself as Spider-Man, Flash dismisses it as a trick. But after witnessing Peter fighting with Daniel Berkhart and Francis Klum, Flash's memories come back to him and he re-establishes his friendship with Peter. Flash briefly appeared at the beginning of the "Brand New Day" story arc, attending a welcome home party for Harry. Flash and the rest of the world's population no longer remembers that Peter is Spider-Man, due to the machinations of the demon Mephisto.

=== Iraq War ===
After the events of "One More Day", Flash Thompson willingly leaves his place as a P.E. instructor to rejoin the Army and fight in the Iraq War out of patriotic zeal, inspired by the selfless life of his lifelong idol Spider-Man. He is still in a close friendship with Peter Parker, as he is seen, lying in his hospital camp bed, with a greeting card by his best friend, and an iPod loaded by Peter himself with "Christmas in Fallujah".

Flash's platoon is ambushed, and Flash suffers several bullet wounds in both legs but continues on in an attempt to save his superior officer from danger. He willingly endangers himself, reasoning that Spider-Man had often committed the same sacrifices for everyone else, and glad to have had the opportunity to imitate him. His actions further damage his legs. This results in the need for them to be amputated below the knees. Flash's sacrifice is enough to earn him a recommendation for the Medal of Honor. He returns to New York, only to shock Peter with the loss of his legs. He reveals to Peter that Spider-Man was his inspiration in Iraq. Harry rents a condo just for Flash, to help him out. He later competes in a disabled athletes sporting event at the local YMCA, managing to come in first place.

Flash later accepts an offer to join Mayor Jameson's office of veteran's affairs. He attends the wedding of May Parker. When the Chameleon (disguised as Peter) meets Flash at the subsequent press conference, he cruelly mocks him, calling him "puny Flash". Flash is seen going through the so-called "stages of grief" backwards, even so far as to use dangerous experimental procedures to regain his legs, but seems to come to terms with his condition, thanks to the support of his friends, family, and his new rehabilitation trainer Sha Shan.

=== Agent Venom ===
Flash Thompson as Agent Venom on the cover of Secret Avengers #23 (April 2012). Art by Arthur Adams.

In a January 2011 interview with Newsarama, Flash Thompson was revealed "by accident" as the new host of Venom. Marvel confirmed Flash was to have his own comic using a military style version of Venom. Despite previously seeming to come to terms with the loss of his legs, Flash jumps at the dangerous offer of being bonded to the Venom symbiote, as the alien will be able to replace his legs with its own bio-mass, allowing him to walk again. He was written as a hero working for the military, and encountered many heroes and villains of the Marvel Universe. He made his premiere as Agent Venom in The Amazing Spider-Man #654 (Feb. 2011), and continues in his own Agent Venom ongoing series following the special The Amazing Spider-Man #654.1.

He cannot stay bonded to the Venom symbiote for more than 48 hours at a time, or the symbiote may gain complete control over him. The consequences of this are first seen when the suit causes Flash to go berserk and brutally slaughter a group of enemy operatives during his second mission, and again during a brawl with the Jack O'Lantern, ending with the suit putting a grenade in Jack O'Lantern's mouth. While on a mission in the Savage Land, Flash is hunted by Kraven the Hunter, who mistakes him for Spider-Man.

During the 2011 "Spider-Island" storyline, Agent Venom is sent in to capture the Spider-King, who is battling Firestar and Gravity. Agent Venom manages to capture the Spider-King who he later discovers is Steve Rogers under the influence of The Queen. Flash uses the symbiote to reform himself as the Spider-King to track the infestation to its source. The Queen and the Jackal send him to kill Anti-Venom because he is curing people who have gained spider-powers, but his superiors order him to take him to Reed Richards to help develop a cure. Flash and the Venom symbiote fight each other because Flash wants to bring Anti-Venom to Richards and the symbiote wants to kill Anti-Venom for previously rejecting it. This leads to Venom and Anti-Venom fighting. Venom wins the fight and delivers Anti-Venom to Richards. Venom teams up with Red Hulk, X-23, Ghost Rider, and Johnny Blaze to fight Blackheart.

He joins the Secret Avengers as Agent Venom. As an Avenger, Flash apprehends the Human Fly, but the Human Fly escapes via a prisoner transport to the Raft when the new Hobgoblin attacks the transport trying to kill the Human Fly for stealing money from the Kingpin. Flash tries to assassinate the third Crime Master for threatening his family, but Eddie Brock attacks him as he is about to fire. This causes the Crime Master to have his new Savage Six attack Flash and Betty Brant. While trying to protect Betty from Jack O'Lantern he reveals his identity to her. Thunderbolt Ross recruits Venom to be part of his Thunderbolts team.

Flash relocates to Philadelphia after fighting the U-Foes there. While trying to capture a serial killer infected with some of the alien technology the U-Foes were trying to sell, so Beast could try to cure the man, he is attacked by Toxin. While in Philadelphia, he adopts a protege in his teenage neighbor Andrea "Andi" Benton, who upon bonding to a duplicate of the symbiote becomes the antiheroine Mania.

Flash returns to New York when Betty Brant contacts him with information that the Crime Master has resurfaced. Flash infiltrates and attacks Crime Master and his men until the Superior Spider-Man (Otto Octavius's mind in Spider-Man's body) and his Spiderlings intervene. Crime Master then reveals himself to be a small-time hood who had purchased the name and mask from Hobgoblin and turns himself in. Superior Spider-Man then turns his attention to Agent Venom with the intent on destroying him. Flash escapes in a puff of smoke and hides in a hospital before going to Peter's apartment. Seizing opportunity, "Peter Parker" invites Flash to his company to give Flash prosthetic legs. After doing so, Superior Spider-Man detains the symbiote in a cage from which it soon breaks free and bonds to Superior Spider-Man to be the Superior Venom. The symbiote tries to flee back to Flash, but Superior Spider-Man keeps it for himself, even going as far as to injure Cardiac when Cardiac tries to separate them. Iron Man arrives to Parker Industries to assist both Cardiac and Flash to take him to the battle-zone and reunite him with the symbiote. The Avengers are starting to fall against the power of Superior Venom who boasts about his superiority until Iron Man arrives to distract him allowing Flash (wearing Iron Man's armor) attack from behind and attempt to retake the symbiote. With the unexpected assistance from Spider-Man's conscience, the Venom symbiote finally leaves Superior Spider-Man's body and reunites with Flash, bonding together again. The Avengers are still in disbelief about Superior Spider-Man's argument until they ask Flash to check his mind-link with the symbiote to see anything wrong about Superior Spider-Man's motives. Flash replies that he sees "two different radio stations playing in the same frequency".

Following the conclusion of The Superior Spider-Man and the return of Peter Parker as Spider-Man, the latter learns that his friend Flash is Venom and became angry at the Avengers that they did not tell him. The Avengers confess that because Flash was a good soldier and the secret identities in the Avengers' rules goes both ways.

Seeking to maintain a connection with the Guardians of the Galaxy, the Avengers placed Venom on said team as their new envoy. At a point the Symbiote began to act strangely considering anyone as an enemy as something was tapping into its mind signalling it. Flash became extremely worried and, since he was left behind when the other Guardians were captured, he began to try to find a way back to Earth which the Symbiote encouraged. However, in its fear it killed people if they refused. Eventually Gamora found them but they attacked her thinking her as an enemy. Star-Lord manages to subdue the Symbiote but Flash goes into a coma. The Symbiote breaks out on the ship and takes the ship to its planet of origin. The planet of Symbiotes explains to the Guardians the origins of the Klyntar. However, Flash and the Venom Symbiote have created the perfect savior the Symbiotes want. This heals the Symbiote and allows Flash to tap into the full potential of the Symbiote.

Venom then becomes the new intergalactic ambassador of Earth and an Agent of the Cosmos.

During the 2016 "Civil War II" storyline, Flash is called back to Earth along with the other Guardians, during which he comes into conflict with Spider-Man, and repeatedly subdues him for not being the Spider-Man he knows. Prompting Miles to electrocute him with the Venom Blast, which blasted him into the open. Andrea, who is host to the Mania symbiote, becomes more ruthless in her actions to the point of killing everyone she encountered. Venom manages to separate the symbiote from Mania, and absorb it into the Venom symbiote, though Andrea is corrupted by a demonic sigil called the Hell-Mark. Flash resolves to remain on Earth to care for Andi until he can find a way to remove the Hell-Mark permanently.

Venom is later shown to have been separated from Flash and it finds a new host in Lee Price. It is eventually revealed that Flash was separated from Venom during a fight with an FBI agent outfitted with high-tech battle suit. The agent used a special weapon that agitated the Symbiote and sent it into a crazed state, which led to it fleeing into the city, where it eventually encountered Price, then reunites with Eddie Brock.

=== Agent Anti-Venom and death ===
Flash Thompson's debut as Agent Anti-Venom on Amazing Spider-Man: Venom Inc. Alpha#1 (Oct. 2017). Art by Ryan Stegman.

After Flash, Mania, Spider-Man, Black Cat, and Venom defeat Price, Flash entrusts the Venom symbiote to Eddie and goes back to heroics as Agent Anti-Venom.

In the Go Down Swinging storyline, Norman Osborn returns with the Carnage symbiote bonded to him, making him the Red Goblin. He attacks New York City, and Silk, Clash, Spider-Man, Human Torch and Agent Anti-Venom tried to stop him. Flash uses his Anti-Venom to heal any of Peter's friends and family that were infected by the Carnage symbiote, and discovers Spider-Man's secret identity in the process. Norman critically wounds Flash, who can no longer heal due to using the Anti-Venom to save the others. Peter offers to use the Venom symbiote to heal him, but Flash refuses, worrying that it would die with him and knows Peter needs an edge over Norman's new powers. He dies in Peter's arms and is honored by Peter and his friends at his funeral.

Maker later obtains a piece of the symbiote taken from Flash's time as Agent Venom, which contains a copy of his consciousness. The sample is dubbed as a codex by the Maker. The brain dead symbiote absorbs the sample during Venom's escape from Project Oversight, and with Eddie Brock's permission the copy takes control and transforms into Agent Venom. Flash's consciousness burns out shortly after.

=== King in Black ===
It was later revealed however, that Flash still existed within the Symbiote hive-mind. He joined Rex Strickland's army of former symbiote hosts when the dark symbiote god Knull started invading Earth, recovering his Anti-Venom symbiote replica. When Eddie Brock died and joined Rex's army, Flash was there to greet him. When Eddie's son Dylan and Thor began freeing hosts from their symbiotes and fighting Knull, a red gash appeared - formed from the dissolved symbiotes of the recently freed hosts - and Flash followed Eddie and Rex through it into the core of the Hive-Mind, the place where they were before having been a "purgatory" for codices. The three of them noticed that the symbiotes freed from Knull's control were being imprisoned and formulated a plan to bond to them the way Flash once had the Venom symbiote. Despite Eddie's protests, Flash volunteered to free the imprisoned symbiotes and "download" himself into one of them, acknowledging this was his mission from the beginning and that Eddie was a hero. Their plan worked, and Flash was incarnated in the world of the living as a symbiote dragon resembling his Anti-Venom symbiote. Informed by Eddie of what had happened when Cletus Kasady's corpse had bonded to a symbiote-dragon, Flash flew to the cemetery where his body had been buried and reanimated himself, bursting from his grave in a recreation of his human form.

== Powers and abilities ==
The Venom symbiote grows a pair of legs for him while he has on the suit. Due to his military training and former boxing career, Flash is an experienced hand-to-hand fighter and a trained marksman. After later gaining the power of the Anti-Venom symbiote, Flash inherits the healing abilities of this suit as well, along with the ability to heal others' physical injuries, and the original Anti-Venom's cleansing powers.

== Reception ==
=== Accolades ===
- In 2012, IGN ranked Flash Thompson's Venom persona 27th in their "Top 50 Avengers" list.
- In 2016, ComicBook.com ranked Flash Thompson's Venom persona 1st in their "Every Venom Host In The Marvel Universe Ranked" list.
- In 2021, Screen Rant included Flash Thompson in their "10 Most Powerful Hosts Of The Venom Symbiote" list.
- In 2022, CBR.com ranked Flash Thompson 10th in their "Most Wholesome Spider-Man Characters" list.

== Other versions ==
=== Amalgam Comics ===
In the Amalgam Comics universe, Flash is a member of the New York Special Crimes Unit. He is also highly distrustful of Spider-Boy, believing him to be in league with the villains he fights.

=== Heroes Reborn ===
An alternate universe version of Flash Thompson appears in Heroes Reborn. This version unintentionally stopped Peter Parker from becoming Spider-Man by pushing him out of the way of the radioactive spider right before it bites him. After attending Capitol University, he ran for a seat in the U.S. House of Representatives, but lost to Kyle Richmond. While attending Capitol University, Thompson falls in love with Gwen Stacy. His obsession with her results in Thompson becoming mentally unstable, killing Miles Warren, and succeed him as Jackal. Gwen eventually defeats Thompson and has him committed to Ravencroft.

=== House of M ===
An alternate universe version of Flash Thompson appears in "House of M". This version is a commentator for the program Sapien Deathmatch.

=== MC2 ===
An alternate universe version of Flash Thompson appears in the MC2 This version is a basketball coach and ex-husband of Felicia Hardy.

=== Spider-Man: Life Story ===
An alternate universe version of Flash Thompson appears in Spider-Man: Life Story. This version was killed in action during the Vietnam War.

=== Spider-Man Loves Mary Jane ===
An alternate universe version of Flash Thompson appears in Spider-Man Loves Mary Jane.

=== Spider-Verse ===
- On Earth-51412, Flash's counterpart Gene is in a relationship with Sarah Jane (this universe's Mary Jane) and bullies Patton Parnell (this universe's Peter Parker).
- Earth-11's Flash Thompson starts off having a friendly relationship with Penelope Parker (Earth-11's Peter Parker), even before the spider bites her and after she becomes Spider-Girl.
- A version of Captain Spider appears as one of the spider-themed heroes recruited by Spider-UK to help combat the Inheritors. He is killed by Morlun.

=== Spider-Island ===
Flash Thompson (as Agent Venom) is the main protagonist in this Secret Wars Warzone version of Spider Island. He leads the resistance after most of the heroes and citizens have been mutated into spider monsters by the Spider Queen. Inspired by the sacrifice of Spider-Man, he leads the resistance (consisting of Werewolf by Night, Jessica Drew, and Vision) into stopping the Queen. His plans to release some heroes from the Spider Queen's control by mutating them into other monsters (such as Curt Connors' Lizard formula and Morbius' vampire formula) succeed and he is able to get monstrous versions of Captain America, Captain Marvel, the Hulk, and Iron Man on his side. When they go get Stegron to help in the cause, they discover Spider-Man's alive and Flash finds out he's Peter Parker. They rescue both to help in their cause. Flash eventually leads the rebellion to successfully stop the Spider Queen, but at the cost of his own life (due to requiring the symbiote to possess the Spider Queen to take her down). Peter becomes the new baron of the place and plans to honor Flash's memory.

=== Marvel Adventures ===
An alternate universe version of Flash Thompson appears in Marvel Adventures.

=== Venomverse ===
In Venomverse a version of Agent Venom is part of the Venoms army gathered by a Venomized Doctor Strange to fight the Poisons. He tries to calm down both Eddie (from the main universe) and Spider-Man (from a universe who didn't get rid of the symbiote), but they are attacked by the Poisons and Flash is killed by a Poison Hulk.

=== Ultimate Marvel ===
Frederick "Flash" Thompson, art by Mark Bagley

The Ultimate Marvel incarnation of the character is Fredrick "Fred" Thompson, a high school jock who bullies Peter Parker and is friends with fellow student Kenny "Kong" McFarlane. Unlike most versions, he does not idolize Spider-Man (something that Kenny does instead) and is generally portrayed unsympathetically. When Flash challenges Peter to a fight, Peter merely blocks a punch from Flash and manages to break his hand. When Peter joins the basketball team, Flash's attitude changes, on account of his tendency towards loyalty to his teammates. When Flash suddenly wants to talk to Peter alone for a moment on at least two occasions, Peter turns him down rather furiously, believing he just wanted to bully in private. After Gwen Stacy's death, it is revealed that Flash had a crush on Gwen and was actually trying to ask Peter for help in approaching Gwen for a date. During Silver Sable's hunt of Spider-Man, Flash is kidnapped after being mistaken by the Wild Pack for Spider-Man, having only moments before disappeared into an alley Flash happened to be standing in. After realizing their mistake, the group considers killing him but Flash is able to escape. This experience gives Flash a new level of popularity within the school, especially after a TV movie is made about his ordeal. After Peter's apparent death as Spider-Man, Flash realizes that he is the only one who did not know that his former bullying victim and the young hero are the same person.

=== What If? ===
In "What if the Radioactive Spider Had Bitten Someone Else?", Flash is one of three characters bitten by the radioactive spider which is behind the Spider powers; the other two are Betty Leeds and John Jameson. After inadvertently killing Crusher Hogan in the ring due to his underestimation of his new strength, Flash begins to fight crime under the name Captain Spider, but his career comes to a brutal stop when he fights Vulture, is knocked out of the sky. Without any web-shooters to save him, he falls to his death.

In "What if Peter Parker Had to Destroy Spider-Man?" a darker twist to the "Captain Spider" story is depicted, with Flash still possessing his aggressive, selfish bully attitude from his early appearances. As Peter witnessed the spider-bite, he becomes Flash's confidant, and Flash pressures Peter to make Flash a costume and weapons. Not wanting Flash to harm anyone permanently, and motivated by his concern for innocents after Mary Jane Watson is killed in a botched burglary, Peter devises the web-shooters, but Flash uses his powers to become a super-criminal called The Spider. A pep talk from Aunt May and Uncle Ben inspires Peter to do something, beginning with him inadvertently saving Otto Octavius from the accident that transformed him into Doctor Octopus in canon. With Octavius's aid, Peter uses his scientific genius to create a robotic exo-skeleton similar to Doc Ock's familiar tentacles, along with other methods that allow him to counter Flash's powers and incapacitate him. Later, Mister Fantastic removes Flash's powers and remarks that Peter has a bright future ahead, using technology rather than biological powers.

In "What if J. Jonah Jameson Adopted Spider-Man?", JJJ adopts Peter after Chameleon's attempt to hijack a NASA shuttle resulted in the deaths of Aunt May, John Jameson, and Chameleon himself. Jameson hires Flash to be Peter's bodyguard, writing off their antagonism as youthful energy. Because Jameson remains convinced that Spider-Man is to blame for the shuttle accident, he hires Spencer Smythe to create the Spider-Slayer, only for Peter to sabotage it in secret. At the demonstration, Flash notices that Smythe has also created the Scorpion suit and takes it for himself, hoping to protect Spidey and possibly become a hero in his own right. However, the serum affects Flash's mind, causing him to go berserk, and Peter (now maskless) goes to try to bring him down. Blinded by rage and addled by the serum, Flash refuses to believe that "Puny Parker" could be Spider-Man and attacks, nearly killing Peter until Jameson intervenes using a remote-controlled Spider-Slayer robot and shoots Flash with an antidote dart.

In What if Flash Thompson became Spider-Man?, the Unseen depicts another example of a timeline in which Flash Thompson is Spider-Man. In this timeline, just as Peter did, Flash starts out in wrestling before taking on a 'heroic' role when he stops the burglar who would have killed Ben Parker, with J. Jonah Jameson finding solace in praising Spider-Man as a hero after the existing system fails to save his son from the shuttle accident that Peter would have saved him from in canon. Flash eventually drops out of school to act full-time as Spider-Man, living in a trailer park with no apparent official income. Peter still becomes Spider-Man's photographer through more conventional methods, but when May Parker suffers serious complications and requires a rare drug to treat her disease, Peter tracks down Flash to ask for his help, only for Flash to accidentally kill Peter when he throws him into the wall of his trailer in a rage in the blind belief that Peter was making him look bad out of jealousy due to their history. Forced to face the fact that he is actually a brutal criminal rather than his perceived role as a hero after seeing the error of his ways, Flash takes action to confront Doctor Octopus and acquire the medicine for May, but subsequently turns himself in for Peter's death.

== In other media ==
=== Television ===
Flash Thompson as he appears in The Spectacular Spider-Man.

- Flash Thompson appears in Spider-Man and His Amazing Friends, voiced by Frank Welker.
- Flash Thompson appears in Spider-Man: The Animated Series, voiced by Patrick Labyorteaux. This version tries to pursue a relationship with Felicia Hardy before entering one with Debra Whitman.
- Flash Thompson appears in Spider-Man: The New Animated Series episode "Flash Memory", voiced by Devon Sawa. This version is more violent and willing to endanger others' lives. He receives an intelligence-enhancing serum from Dr. Zellner, but quickly suffers from its side effects before helping Spider-Man defeat the scientist.
- Flash Thompson appears in The Spectacular Spider-Man, voiced by Joshua LeBar. This version was Peter Parker's childhood friend and a fan of Spider-Man who earned his nickname due to his habit of streaking as a child and starts off as a bully before mellowing out as the series progresses.
- Flash Thompson appears in Ultimate Spider-Man, voiced by Matt Lanter as a young adult and Logan Miller as a child. This version is an acquaintance of Harry Osborn and Mary Jane Watson. As the series progresses, he eventually reforms and becomes the Venom symbiote's second major host, dubs himself Agent Venom, and joins the New Warriors and Web Warriors.
- Flash Thompson appears in Spider-Man (2017), voiced by Benjamin Diskin. Over the course of the series, he mellows out as a bully due to traumatic encounters with the Venom symbiote.
- Flash Thompson makes a non-speaking cameo appearance in the X-Men '97 episode "Tolerance is Extinction – Part 3".

=== Film ===
- In James Cameron's aborted script treatment for Spider-Man, the character of Eugene "Flash" Thompson is renamed Nathan McCreery.
- Flash Thompson appears in Sam Raimi's Spider-Man trilogy, portrayed by Joe Manganiello.
  - Introduced in Spider-Man (2002), this version is initially Mary Jane Watson's boyfriend in addition to being Peter Parker's rival and bully. While the film does not reveal what sport Thompson plays, the tie-in novelization reveals him to be a football quarterback. The novel also states he is from a rich family and borderline abusive towards Mary Jane, unique to this version. After Parker accidentally uses his newly acquired superpowers to humiliate Thompson, a fight between them breaks out at school, which Parker wins due to his powers. During their graduation, Thompson has an argument with Watson, causing her to reject his proposal and break up with him.
  - Thompson makes a cameo appearance in Spider-Man 3, in which he attends Harry Osborn's funeral following the latter's death while saving Parker from Venom.
- Flash Thompson appears in The Amazing Spider-Man duology, portrayed by Chris Zylka.
  - Introduced in The Amazing Spider-Man (2012), this version is a basketball captain and is friends with Gwen Stacy, who serves as a voice of reason for him, in addition to being Peter Parker's bully. Upon gaining superpowers, Parker humiliates Thompson during a basketball practice session. Following Ben Parker's death, Thompson sympathizes with Peter, ceases bullying him, expresses admiration for Spider-Man, and gradually becomes a better person.
  - Thompson makes a minor appearance in The Amazing Spider-Man 2. Additionally, a deleted scene titled "Flash Forward" depicts Thompson and Peter having become friends and the former expressing a desire to attend military school. Prior to the franchise's cancellation, there were slated plans for Thompson to become Agent Venom in spin-off films, which Zylka was eager for.
- Eugene "Flash" Thompson appears in the Marvel Cinematic Universe (MCU) Spider-Man trilogy, portrayed by Tony Revolori. Due to Revolori not being white, as the character is traditionally portrayed, an online contingent sent hate mail and death threats to the actor.
  - Introduced in Spider-Man: Homecoming, this version is a "smug, rich kid", a student of the Midtown School of Science and Technology, a classmate of Peter Parker, whom he verbally bullies, and a practicing DJ on the side. After being saved by Spider-Man, Thompson's admiration for him starts to develop.
  - In Spider-Man: Far From Home, Thompson is revealed to have been a victim of the Blip and become a minor social media star with followers he dubs the "Flash Mob". Following his attendance in a school summer trip, Thompson's difficult home life is alluded to as his father is ill and his mother is distant; having sent a chauffeur to pick him up from the airport rather than do so personally.
  - As of Spider-Man: No Way Home, Thompson has dyed his hair blonde, supports Parker after his identity as Spider-Man is outed, and is later accepted into MIT.
- Flash Thompson / Captain Spider makes a non-speaking cameo appearance in Spider-Man: Across the Spider-Verse as a member of Miguel O'Hara's Spider-Society.

=== Video games ===
- Flash Thompson as Agent Venom appears as a playable character in Marvel Avengers Alliance.
- Flash Thompson as Agent Venom appears as a playable character in Marvel Super Hero Squad Online.
- Flash Thompson as Captain Spider, Agent Venom, and Agent Anti-Venom appear as separate playable characters in Spider-Man Unlimited.
- Flash Thompson as Agent Venom appears as a playable character in Marvel: Contest of Champions.
- Flash Thompson as Agent Venom appears in Marvel Heroes, voiced by Crispin Freeman.
- Flash Thompson as Agent Venom appears as a playable character in Marvel Puzzle Quest.
- Flash Thompson as Agent Venom appears as a playable character in Marvel: Future Fight.
- Flash Thompson as Agent Venom appears as a playable character in Lego Marvel Super Heroes 2.
- Flash Thompson as Agent Venom appears as a playable character in Marvel Avengers Academy.
- Flash Thompson as Agent Venom appears in Marvel Snap.

=== Miscellaneous ===
Flash Thompson appears in Spider-Man: Turn Off the Dark, originally played by Matt Caplan.

== Collected editions ==
Title	Material collected	Release date	ISBN
Venom by Rick Remender Vol. 1	Venom (vol. 2) #1–5	October 2011	0-7851-5811-1
Spider-Island	Venom (vol. 2) #6–9, along with other material	January 2012	0-7851-5104-4
Venom: Circle of Four	Venom (vol. 2) #10–14, 13.1–13.4	June 2012	0-7851-6450-2
Venom: The Savage Six	Venom (vol. 2) #15–22	October 2012	0-7851-5812-X
Venom by Rick Remender: The Complete Collection Vol. 1	Venom (vol. 2) #1-12, Venom/Deadpool: What If? #1	June 2015	978-0785193524
Venom by Rick Remender: The Complete Collection Vol. 2	Venom (vol. 2) #13, 13.1-13.4, 14-22	August 2015	978-0785193531
Venom: Devil's Pack	Venom (vol. 2) #23–25, 28–30	April 2013	978-0785161240
Minimum Carnage	Minimum Carnage: Alpha; Venom (vol. 2) #26–27; Scarlet Spider (vol. 2) #10–11, 12.1; Minimum Carnage: Omega	January 2013	0-7851-6726-9
Venom: Toxin With a Vengeance!	Venom (vol. 2) #31–35	September 2013	978-0785166924
Venom: The Land Where Killers Dwell	Venom (vol. 2) #36–42, 27.1	January 2014	978-0785166931
Venom by Cullen Bunn: The Complete Collection	Venom (vol. 2) #23–42, #27.1; Minimum Carnage: Alpha, Omega; Scarlet Spider (vol. 2) #10–11	September 2018	978-1302913649
Venom: Space Knight Vol. 1: Agent of the Cosmos	Venom: Space Knight #1–6	July 2016	978-0785196549
Venom: Space Knight Vol. 2: Enemies and Allies	Venom: Space Knight #7–13	December 2016	978-0785196556
