= The Other (comics) =

Publication information
- Publisher: Marvel Comics
- First appearance: Friendly Neighborhood Spider-Man #4 (January 2006)
- Created by: Peter David (writer); Mike Wieringo (artist); Todd Nauck (artist)

In-story information
- Alter ego: Ero
- Team affiliations: Web Warriors
- Supporting character of: Earth-616 Peter Parker (mate); Earth-616 Kaine Parker (host); MC2 Peter Parker (host)
- Notable aliases: "The Other" "Miss Arrow"
- Abilities: Envenomed stingers extended from her wrists, transformation into a swarm of spiders, control of spiders

The Other (Ero) is a fictional character appearing in American comic books published by Marvel Comics. A nigh-omnipotent physical embodiment of Spider-Man's spider-powers, it initially takes the form of Miss Arrow, before the reality alternation of "One More Day" leads it to take Kaine Parker and MC2 Peter Parker as hosts, opposing Morlun, the Inheritors, and Shathra.

== Publication history ==
The Other was created by Peter David, Mike Wieringo, and Todd Nauck, and first appeared in Friendly Neighborhood Spider-Man #4 (Jan 2006).

== Fictional character biography ==
=== The Other ===
During the events of The Other, Spider-Man is killed in battle with Morlun. However, his body is later discovered as a sack of skin; Spider-Man had shed his skin and created a 'cocoon' under the Brooklyn Bridge, which he later emerged from, completely healed of his prior wounds. Thus, Spider-Man had 'conquered' death.

Meanwhile, in Stark Tower, pirate spiders begin eating Peter's old dead body. When Spider-Man returns, the top of Stark Tower is covered in webbing. Inside the tower, Spider-Man discovers that pirate spiders had consumed his skin. Sated on his flesh, the spiders form into a body of their own, female in opposition to Spider-Man's male.

=== Miss Arrow ===
After Peter injures Flash Thompson during a dodgeball game, Ero, taking on the form of the African American Miss Arrow, treats to Thompson's injury while explaining that she was the new Midtown High School nurse. When the school is attacked by the three Mysterios, Arrow quickly shows that she was not all she appeared to be. Quentin Beck sees through her guise and tells her that their "superiors" want to keep Peter at the school, while Francis Klum sees firsthand what Arrow is capable of.

Arrow later convinces Spider-Man to stay at the school. When Peter becomes a fugitive for opposing Iron Man during the events of "Civil War", he uses an image inducer to pose as Ben Reilly and continue his career at the school. Later, Arrow began to show her sinister nature little by little, most notably when Flash Thompson begins dating Betty Brant. As the two are going on a date, Betty is frightened by thousands of spiders. When Thompson and the restaurant manager come to the scene, only some cocaine and a straw is found, making the manager think Betty had used cocaine.

Arrow was revealed as the being composed of pirate spiders first seen in "The Other". She had disguised herself as a human and decides to set into motion her plan to have Thompson become her "host". Meanwhile, Brant and Peter begin to suspect that Arrow is hiding something especially since Peter realizes that she does not set off his spider-sense when she is near to discovering his secret identity. Arrow, in the meantime, has tracked Flash Thompson down at a bowling alley where he has gone with his friend, professional bowler Kelly Kulick. Not wanting to waste anymore time, Arrow reveals her true nature to the surrounding bystanders. While Spider-Man arrives in time to stop the carnage and save Kulick, Arrow makes off with Thompson.

Ero takes Thompson to the church where she emerged from her cocoon and removes an egg sac from her stomach, intending to impregnate him with her eggs. Spider-Man arrives in time once again to stop her. Ero then manages to stab Spider-Man in the shoulder, drugging him and slowing him down. Having the upper hand, Ero decides to impregnate Spider-Man instead. As Ero is about to implant her egg into Spider-Man, Betty Brant arrives and destroys it. Enraged at the loss of her eggs, and vowing revenge against Brant, Ero tries to escape. Spider-Man lures Ero into an aviary, where she is eaten by birds. Only a single spider remains, which Spider-Man steps on.

=== Return ===
After being killed by the Lobo Brothers, Kaine Parker is resurrected as the avatar of the Other, giving him a spider-like appearance. However, the Other makes Kaine's mind unstable, causing him to attack his friend Hummingbird. The Other is later revealed to still be alive and chooses the Peter Parker of Earth-982 as its new avatar.

== Powers and abilities ==
The Other is composed of thousands of spiders that possess a hive mind. The Other possesses wrist stingers that are poisonous to anyone who was stabbed by them, an ability later demonstrated by Spider-Man and Kaine Parker. It is also shown to possess night vision.

== In other media ==
Miss Arrow appears in Spider-Man: Turn Off the Dark, portrayed by Alice Lee.
