= One Moment in Time (comics) =

2010 Spider-Man comic books storyline

- Cover to The Amazing Spider-Man #638. Art by Paolo Rivera.
- Publisher: Marvel Comics
- Publication date: September – October 2010
- Genre: Superhero
- Title(s): The Amazing Spider-Man #638–641 (4 issues)
- Main character(s): Spider-Man; Mary Jane Watson

Creative team
- Writer: Joe Quesada
- Artist: Paolo Rivera

"One Moment in Time" is a 2010 comic book storyline published by Marvel Comics starring Spider-Man. Written by Joe Quesada and illustrated by Paolo Rivera, it was originally published in The Amazing Spider-Man #638–641, and immediately follows "The Gauntlet" storyline. It is notable for revealing what changes the villain Mephisto made to save the life of Peter Parker/Spider-Man's aunt, May Parker, and dissolve the wedding of Parker and Mary Jane Watson at the end of the 2007 "One More Day" storyline.

The name of the storyline forms the acronym O.M.I.T., which Quesada explained was an intentional reference to how Parker and Watson's wedding was removed from continuity.

== Storytelling ==
In The Amazing Spider-Man #638, the story is told as a mixture of flashbacks and current events. The flashbacks are from the end of "One More Day" or Amazing Spider-Man Annual #21. The flashbacks use actual pages from the original comics, and are mixed in with new pages that illustrate how events were changed by the villainous demon Mephisto.

In Amazing Spider-Man #639, the story is told as a mixture of flashbacks and current events. The flashbacks are from "Civil War" and Amazing Spider-Man #539-543. These flashbacks are only panels from the original comics and not full pages.

In Amazing Spider-Man #640, the story is told as the altered events of "Back in Black" and "One More Day", as well as other events contemporaneous with those storylines.

== Plot ==
Mary Jane Watson whispers to Mephisto that Peter will not trade his marriage for Aunt May's life unless Mary Jane tells him to accept the agreement, and that Mephisto will leave Peter alone forever when the deal is done. Mephisto agrees to these terms. At present time MJ shows up at Peter's door. They talk about how they have been acting towards each other lately and both agree they want to be friends with each other. Then they reminisce about what happened on what was supposed to be their wedding day. Spider-Man stops Electro and his gang. One of the gang members, Eddie, makes note of the arresting officer's name. Then Mephisto, as a red pigeon, swoops down and unlocks the door of the police car Eddie is in, allowing him to escape while the officers are occupied with cuffing Electro. Spider-Man is out patrolling that night and hears the gunshots of Eddie shooting at the arresting officer and his wife. While saving the policeman and his wife, Spider-Man gets hit in the head with a cinder block. He chases after Eddie and tackles him off the side of a building. Though Spider-Man foils the murder, during his struggle, he and Eddie fall from a building to the ground, with Spider-Man absorbing most of the impact. Eddie escapes, declining to kill Spider-Man because he saved Eddie's life. On the wedding morning, Mary Jane shows up but Peter does not as he is lying unconscious in an alleyway.

After Peter misses his wedding he tries to explain what happened to Mary Jane, but she knows that it is because of his crimefighting, and says she will only marry him if he gives up being Spider-Man. Peter declines, and Mary Jane leaves him. After Mary Jane's aunt Anna urges her to reconsider, Mary Jane goes to Peter, and tells him that she always imagined having a daughter with him that took after both of them. She adds that she cannot have children with him because his life as a superhero would not be fair to them. They are still together when Aunt May gets shot during the events related to Civil War. Refusing to accept her death, Peter performs CPR, miraculously bringing her back to life.

Wilson Fisk, informed of May's survival by a disguised Mephisto, decides to send a masked hitman after Anna Watson. The assassin is interrupted by Mary Jane, who then becomes his target, and then by Spider-Man, who dispatches and unmasks him, revealing him to be Eddie. Spider-Man brings the wounded Mary Jane to Doctor Strange, who performs a healing spell on her. Peter insists that Doctor Strange should make people forget he is Spider-Man. Doctor Strange contacts Tony Stark and Reed Richards for advice on the matter, because they are partially responsible for Peter's identity becoming public.

Both Richards and Stark agree with Strange, but it takes some convincing. They decide that nobody, including themselves and Mary Jane, will remember anything. Peter enters a protective shell to shield himself from the changes. At the last moment, he leaps out of the shield and pulls Mary Jane in with him so she will not forget either. They wake up in the motel and Peter explains what has happened. Mary Jane asks why he could not just let her forget. She explains that she cannot be with him because it is only a matter of time before somebody rips off his mask and they go after her family, a danger she cannot allow. Back in the present, Mary Jane explains that he has to move on and find somebody who can be with him. Spider-Man, standing on a rooftop, says that the best person he has ever known has set him free, that he can face anything in life and that today feels like a brand new day.

== Reception ==
- The first issue received a rating of 5.5 out of 10 from IGN, and a 3.5 out of 5 from Comic Book Resources.
- The second issue received a 6.0 out of 10 from IGN, and a 3.5 out of 5 from Comic Book Resources.
- The third issue received a 6.5 rating out of 10 from IGN, and a 3 out of 5 from Comic Book Resources.
- The fourth issue received a 6.5 rating out of 10 from IGN, and a 2.5 out of 5 from Comic Book Resources.

== In other media ==
The 2021 film Spider-Man: No Way Home borrows aspects from the storyline such as Peter Parker initially asking Doctor Strange to erase people's memory of his identity as Spider-Man with the exception of Michelle Jones, Ned Leeds and Aunt May after it was revealed to the world by Mysterio who also incriminated him at the end of the 2019 film Spider-Man: Far From Home. In the film's climax, however, Parker has Strange cast a new spell to make his existence completely forgotten to the entire world, including his friend and girlfriend.

== See also ==
- Spider-Man Collected Editions
