= Back in Black (comics) =

2007 Marvel Comics storyline

- Cover of The Amazing Spider-Man vol. 3, 539 (Apr, 2007), art by Ron Garney
- Publisher: Marvel Comics
- Publication date: April – October 2007
- Genre: Superhero
- Title(s): The Amazing Spider-Man #539–543
- Main character(s): Spider-Man; Mary Jane Watson; Aunt May; Kingpin

Creative team
- Writer: J. Michael Straczynski
- Artist: Ron Garney
- Penciller: Ron Garney
- Inker: Bill Reinhold
- Letterer: VC's Cory Petit
- Colorist: Matt Milla
- Editor: Joe Quesada

"Back in Black" is a 2007 Marvel Comics storyline written by J. Michael Straczynski and illustrated by Ron Garney (penciler). It was published in the comic book series The Amazing Spider-Man #539–543.

It takes place immediately after Marvel's Civil War event and depicts what happened to Spider-Man, Mary Jane Watson, and Aunt May during and after the event. The story is about Spider-Man's anger and determination to find Aunt May's shooter. Hence, he wears the black suit, modeled after the Venom symbiote, to emphasize his humorless aggression. He is often seen in action without his mask on, as well, showing his rage and thirst for vengeance.

== Plot ==
=== Part 1 ===
Peter Parker, Mary Jane, and Aunt May are outside reminiscing about Uncle Ben and Peter when he was a kid when an assassin shoots May. Mary Jane attempts to contact 911, but they have no time, so Peter (without taking the time to change into his Spider-Man costume) transports May to the hospital via web-slinging. Peter hides from the hospital staff but still hears that May has lost a lot of blood. Meanwhile, in prison, the Kingpin is given a message by a police officer, Charlie. He quotes Euripides, who wrote "Whom the gods would destroy, they first make mad." (from Medea, citing it as his favorite saying).

MJ meets Peter in Times Square, and Peter tells her to do anything she can to keep Aunt May alive while Peter will find evidence of the assassin. He visits the shooter's perch – restraining a police officer with a thick coat of webbing. Inside, he finds a sniper scope there. He leaves without freeing the police officer. He then breaks up an illegal weapons sale (still in the same "civilian" clothing since the shooting) and interrogates the criminals about the unusual sniper scope. When a gun-runner hesitates to answer Peter correctly, Peter breaks the man's hand in his grip. MJ visits May in the hospital and a doctor tells her that May is not going to survive. Peter swears that he will not stop until he finds who is responsible, and puts on his black suit.

=== Part 2 ===
Peter begins hunting down more sniper scope sellers. While beating up the last one, Peter throws the seller out of the window, but then catches him with a line of webbing to his foot. The dealer then tells Peter that the assassin who purchased the scope was named Jake Martino. Peter (still in the black suit) looks for Martino in a police laptop and finds his address. He goes to Martino's apartment but Martino has already left. The apartment owner talks to him, tells him two men were looking for Martino as well, and tells him that Martino has left for the subways. Spider-Man confronts Martino, beats him brutally, breaks his arm, unmasks again, then questions him about who hired him. Just when Martino is about to tell the name, he is shot through the chest. Peter attaches one of his spider-tracers to the second assassin before he escapes. The police arrive to help Martino and Spider-Man goes along with Martino's ambulance, which takes them to the same hospital where Aunt May is staying. MJ meets Peter and tells him that May's not going to make it. Martino succumbs to his injuries. Spider-Man finds the second shooter, who appears to be calling someone. Peter webs up the mouth of the assassin and hears who is on the phone. He realizes the caller is Wilson Fisk, the Kingpin.

=== Part 3 ===
Peter figures out that Martino was hired to kill him, not May. He asks the assassin about why they decided to kill Martino. The man merely replies that he knew something Fisk did not know, and that is the only information he knows.

Charlie visits Fisk again and Fisk asks if Charlie could do something for him. Charlie agrees, as long as the request doesn't break any rules. The Kingpin replies that it's beyond the rules, and then destroys his table, which is stacked with millions of dollars in cash – a king's ransom. He tells the police officer to share it with his fellow policemen, and Charlie releases Fisk. Fisk then asks Charlie to bring his traditional clothes.

Peter ties the second shooter, Jim, in a sewer where he is attacked by rats. Peter threatens the shooter by talking about the food chain. Jim says he will do anything and Peter tells him that he could let no one get close to his family.

Peter travels to the hospital and transfuses some of his blood to May to cure her. He then goes to the prison to confront the Kingpin.

=== Part 4 ===
Peter breaks into the penitentiary for the showdown. Surrounded by the prison's inmates, The Kingpin and Spider-Man face off and Fisk calls Peter a "chump" for believing in the greater good. Fisk's taunts enrage Spider-Man to the point of nearly killing Fisk. Spider-Man tells him that he is not going to kill him, but Peter Parker is, then removes his mask. He effortlessly topples Fisk for a time, taunting how easy it would be to finish him until Fisk says that if he is going to kill him, he should do it now. Spider-Man says that he will not kill Fisk yet, but he will if May dies. He leaves the prison, while a defeated Fisk and all the inmates return to their cells.

Peter visits May, and MJ tells him that they have to let May get transferred to a less expensive hospital. Peter says his reason for placing May in that hospital is that it is the best, but agrees that they can no longer afford it.

=== An incident on the fourth floor ===
Peter chats with an unconscious May while MJ sleeps. Peter suspects that May may have built a resistance in her body to counter his earlier blood transfusion. The hospital reverend arrives, and asks if they have any plans for a funeral.

After the nurses complete a blood test for May, Peter steals the report and sees that it did not work. A second report is given to a police officer named Delint. They have a short conversation, at the same time the head nurse talks with Delint about the missing first report, radiation in May's blood, and them paying in cash. She also tells her opinion of the story, then tells Delint that MJ is still upstairs. Delint goes up to May's room and Peter, sensing him, hides. MJ opens the door for Delint (who reveals himself as Lieutenant Detective Robert Delint) and the lights go out. Peter appears and knocks the officer out.

The two realize that, with Delint suspicious, they have to transfer May immediately. Peter finds himself breaking the law to facilitate the transfer of his aunt, which causes him to doubt his own beliefs.

== Prequels, sequels, and tie-ins ==
- Aunt May was shot in The Amazing Spider-Man #538. Jake Martino's motives, as well as Kingpin's, were also revealed.
- Friendly Neighborhood Spider-Man featured a tie-in storyline "Sandblasted" in #17–19 and additional tie-ins in #20–23
- The Sensational Spider-Man volume 2 featured tie-ins "The Strange Case of..." (in #35–37), "The Last Temptation of Eddie Brock" (#38–39), and "The Book of Peter" (#40)
- Spider-Man Family includes tie-in stories in #1–2.
- The story is concluded in Spider-Man: One More Day. After One More Day, Spider-Man: Brand New Day begins.

== Collected editions ==
"Back in Black" storylines ran through the three Spider-Man titles that were being published in 2007: The Amazing Spider-Man, Friendly Neighborhood Spider-Man, and The Sensational Spider-Man volume 2. They were later collected as:

- Spider-Man: Back in Black – reprints Amazing Spider-Man 539–543 and Friendly Neighborhood Spider-Man #17–23 and Annual #1 (hardcover, 2007, ISBN 0-7851-2904-9; trade paperback, 2008, ISBN 0-7851-2996-0)
- Spider-Man, Peter Parker: Back in Black – reprints Sensational Spider-Man #35–40 and Annual #1, Spider-Man Family #1–2, Spider-Man: Back in Black Handbook and Marvel Spotlight – Spider-Man: Back in Black (hardcover, 2007, ISBN 0-7851-2920-0; trade paperback, 2008, ISBN 0-7851-2997-9)

== Other versions ==
=== What If? ===
An issue of What If? revolving around Spider-Man: Back in Black had asked "What If Mary Jane Was Shot Instead of Aunt May?". While in the main continuity Aunt May did not die instantly, the What if explores the consequences of Mary Jane actually dying from the shot. After MJ dies, Peter is shot in the back. The sniper believes him dead and begins to leave, only to be caught by a very much alive Peter who kills him with his own gun. Peter then tells Aunt May what he has done, and dons the black suit. From then on, he begins a vendetta against Wilson Fisk, going through Iron Man and S.H.I.E.L.D. to get to him. It ends with a standoff between Peter and Fisk, with Aunt May being used as a bargaining chip: she'll be killed if Peter attacks Fisk. Peter kills Fisk by shoving his arm through the Kingpin's chest, then quickly disarms one of two guards. He scares the other one into laying down his weapon. Aunt May disowns him as her nephew after witnessing that, then Tony Stark has Peter arrested and comforts her.

== In other media ==
The storyline's title is used in the eighth episode of the first season of Ultimate Spider-Man.
