= Friendly Neighborhood Spider-Man =

Comic book series by Marvel Comics

- Friendly Neighborhood Spider-Man vol 1, #1. Art by Mike Wieringo.

Publication information
- Publisher: Marvel Comics
- Schedule: Monthly
- Format: Ongoing series
- Genre: Superhero
- Publication date: (vol. 1) December 2005 – November 2007; (vol. 2) March 2019 – February 2020
- No. of issues: (vol. 1) 24 + annual issue; (vol. 2) 14
- Main character: Spider-Man

Creative team
- Written by: (vol. 1) Peter David, J. Michael Straczynski; (vol. 2) Tom Taylor
- Pencillers: (vol. 1) Mike Wieringo, Todd Nauck; (vol. 2) Juan Cabal, Ken Lashley
- Editors: (vol. 1) Tom Brevoort, Axel Alonso, Stephen Wacker; (vol. 2) Nick Lowe

Friendly Neighborhood Spider-Man is a comic book series that was published by Marvel Comics. The title is derived from a trademark self-referential comment often made by Spider-Man (as in "just another service provided by your friendly neighborhood Spider-Man!"). The first series began in October 2005 and was primarily written by Peter David. Friendly Neighborhood Spider-Man was canceled after issue #24, part 2 of J. Michael Straczynski and Joe Quesada's controversial "One More Day" storyline. Kurt Busiek has revealed that in 1995 he originally suggested "Friendly Neighborhood Spider-Man" as the title of the series which was eventually published as Untold Tales of Spider-Man.

In March 2019 a new volume was launched by writer Tom Taylor and artist Juan Cabal and lasted 14 issues, ending in February 2020.

== Storylines (Volume 1) ==
=== "The Other" (issues #1–4) ===
The first story arc is the twelve-part crossover, "Spider-Man: The Other", one-third of which was told in Friendly Neighborhood Spider-Man (the other two-thirds told in Marvel Knights Spider-Man and The Amazing Spider-Man).

=== "Web Log" (issue #5) ===
Vanna Smith becomes convinced that Spider-Man has been stalking her since high school. She continually updates her blog, critiquing Spider-Man, even obtaining a restraining order against the hero. Approximately 50 years into the future, Mary Jane meets up with Vanna in a park. Mary Jane informs Vanna that Spider-Man has died, and chides her for having done nothing with her life. Vanna admits she misses Spider-Man before Mary Jane walks away.

=== "Masks" (issues #6–7) ===
Spider-Man struggles with the combination of both science and magic in his origin, using scientific means to take down a magic foe.

=== "Jumping the Tracks" (issues #8–10) ===
In an alternative, future timeline, the daughter of Spider-Man 2211 becomes the Hobgoblin. Hobgoblin uses bombs that erase its victims from existence to kill alternative versions of Spider-Man, but accidentally kills herself using one. Earlier, Hobgoblin brought an alternative Uncle Ben to the 616 reality to manipulate Peter. As Spider-Man 2211 prepares to return Uncle Ben to his proper reality, Uncle Ben shoots and kills him, revealed to be the Chameleon of 2211.

=== "I Hate a Mystery" (issues #11–13) ===
Faced with the consequences of having revealed his identity to support Iron-Man's Pro-Registration movement, Peter plans to resign his position as a science teacher at Midtown High once the day ends. Miss Arrow, a nurse who is capable of shooting stingers from her wrist, falls in love with Flash Thompson. Flash, angry at Peter for "pretending" to be Spider-Man, challenges Peter to a dodgeball game, but loses. Francis Klum returns as the new Mysterio, trapping the school with noxious gas. Daniel Berkhart, the second Mysterio, appears and offers to help defeat Klum.

Spider-Man seeks Klum while Flash and Miss Arrow help the remaining students escape the school. Berkhart reveals that he is only there to assume the role of the sole Mysterio and fights Klum before being subdued by Spider-Man. Flash admits to himself that Peter is Spider-Man, helping him save the students and defeat Klum, saving Spider-Man's life in the process. Quentin Beck, the original Mysterio, kidnaps Miss Arrow, instructing her to convince Peter to remain as a science teacher.

=== "Taking Wing" (issues #14–16) ===
Vulture is recruited to kill Spider-Man for operating outside the law. Meanwhile, Spider-Man is given a cloaking device from Beast and obtains a job at Midtown as Ben Reilly. Spider-Man defeats Vulture and takes him to the hospital. Vulture, who has become paralyzed, pleads for Spider-Man to kill him. Although he initially refuses to do so, Vulture uses Uncle Ben's death to taunt Spider-Man, and Spider-Man begins to smother Vulture to death before stopping. Spider-Man tells Vulture how compassion is a good thing before leaving.

=== "Sandblasted" (issues #17–19) ===
A continuation of the "Back In Black" storyline, Spider-Man hides using his Ben Reilly alias and takes a job as Flash Thompson's assistant coach. Flash soon discovers Peter's identity and offers him shelter at this apartment. While resting, Peter is visited by Sandman, whom he had earlier helped to break Floyd Baker out of prison, who Sandman claimed killed Ben Parker. They meet Dennis, who has Spider-Man 2211's helmet after witnessing him be murdered by Baker. Spider-Man, Sandman, and Dennis use the helmet to discover that Chameleon had taken Ben Parker's identity. Spider-Man and Sandman defeat Chameleon before he can kill Floyd, but are unable to figure out how the helmet registered 11,000 targets in the school with Chameleon.

== Collected editions ==
=== Volume 1 ===
| # | Title | Material collected | Released | Format | Pages | ISBN |
|---|---|---|---|---|---|---|
| | Spider-Man: The Other | Amazing Spider-Man #525-528; Friendly Neighborhood Spider-Man #1-4; Marvel Knights Spider-Man #19-22 | 25 Oct 2006 | HC | 288 | 978-0785121886 |
| | Spider-Man: The Other | Amazing Spider-Man #525-528; Friendly Neighborhood Spider-Man #1-4; Marvel Knights Spider-Man #19-22 | 4 Apr 2007 | Red costume TPB | 288 | 978-0785117650 |
| | Spider-Man: The Other | Amazing Spider-Man #525-528; Friendly Neighborhood Spider-Man #1-4; Marvel Knights Spider-Man #19-22 | 4 Apr 2007 | Black costume TPB | 288 | 978-0785128120 |
| 1 | Derailed | Friendly Neighborhood Spider-Man #5-10 | 27 Sep 2006 | TPB | 144 | 978-0785122166 |
| 2 | Mystery Date | Friendly Neighborhood Spider-Man #11-16 | 4 Apr 2007 | TPB | 136 | 978-0785122173 |
| | Civil War: Spider-Man | Friendly Neighborhood Spider-Man #11-16, Amazing Spider-Man #529-538, Sensational Spider-Man #28-34 | 26 Jan 2011 | OHC | 544 | 978-0785148821 |
| | Spider-Man: Back In Black | Amazing Spider-Man #539-543; Friendly Neighborhood Spider-Man #17-23, Annual #1 | 24 Oct 2007 | HC | 336 | 978-0785129042 |
| | Spider-Man: Back In Black | Amazing Spider-Man #539-543; Friendly Neighborhood Spider-Man #17-23, Annual #1 | 27 Feb 2008 | TPB | 336 | 978-0785129967 |
| | Spider-Man: One More Day | Amazing Spider-Man #544-545; Sensational Spider-Man #41; Friendly Neighborhood Spider-Man #24 | 9 Apr 2008 | HC | 136 | 978-0785126331 |
| | Spider-Man: One More Day | Amazing Spider-Man #544-545; Sensational Spider-Man #41; Friendly Neighborhood Spider-Man #24 | 27 Aug 2008 | TPB | 136 | 978-0785126348 |
| | Friendly Neighborhood Spider-Man by Peter David - The Complete Collection | Friendly Neighborhood Spider-Man #5-23 and Annual #1 | 19 Apr 2017 | TPB | 480 | 978-1302904364 |

=== Volume 2 ===
| # | Title | Material collected | Released | Format | Pages | ISBN |
|---|---|---|---|---|---|---|
| 1 | Secrets And Rumors | Friendly Neighborhood Spider-Man (vol. 2) #1-6 | 23 Jul 2019 | TPB | 144 | 978-1302916909 |
| 2 | Hostile Takeovers | Friendly Neighborhood Spider-Man (vol. 2) #7-14 | 28 Jan 2020 | TPB | 176 | 978-1302916916 |
| | Spider-Man by Tom Taylor | Friendly Neighborhood Spider-Man (vol. 2) #1-14, material from FCBD 2019: Spider-Man / Venom | 28 Nov 2023 | TPB | 360 | 978-1302953485 |

== See also ==
- List of Spider-Man titles
