= Tracer (Marvel Comics) =

Publication information
- Publisher: Marvel Comics
- First appearance: Friendly Neighborhood Spider-Man #1 (October 2005)
- Created by: Peter David; Mike Wieringo

In-story information
- Notable aliases: Tommy
- Abilities: Mental control over seemingly all mechanical or machine based devices no matter how simple or elaborate.; Analyzing sensors can protract from fingertips that puncture a person's flesh to gain DNA samples.

Tracer is a supervillain appearing in American comic books published by Marvel Comics. The character is usually depicted as an enemy of Spider-Man. His first appearance was in Friendly Neighborhood Spider-Man #1.

== Fictional character biography ==
Tracer claims to be a "machine god" that the artificial intelligences of other machines created to worship, alleging that he becomes stronger over time since the more machines worship him the longer he operates. Testing his increasing powers, Tracer robs the Bank of New York, holds off Spider-Man and escapes. Soon after, Tracer takes to the skies in his Flying Wing, claiming he had a bomb he would detonate if New York City fails to pay him a fortune. Spider-Man and Iron Man (Tony Stark) foil his scheme, but Tracer escapes again.

The next night, Tracer infiltrates Stark Tower planning to kill Spider-Man after learning from his machine worshipers that Spider-Man is living there. At the same time, Tracer uses his powers to cause cars to swerve out of control, entire computers grids to crash, and a giant robot to rampage throughout New York as a diversion. Posing as a reserve Avenger named "Tommy" on monitor duty while the other Avengers were busy dealing with Tracer's "machine revolt", Tracer converses with Aunt May until Spider-Man returns and attacks him. During the battle, Tracer analyzes Spider-Man's DNA and determines that Spider-Man is in no condition to fight him. Vowing to rein in his mechanical worshipers and step off the path of divinity for the time being, his skin melts away, revealing his robotic body.

== Powers and abilities ==
Tracer is a robotic life form capable of controlling virtually any machine. He can metamorphose his hand into a gun which fires homing bullets capable of zeroing in on specified targets and avoiding all other targets in their pursuit.

He is also equipped with telescopic infrared vision and scanners which can estimate the age, weight, power and threat level of his targets. His fingertips contain hypodermic probes which can obtain DNA, tissue, skin and blood samples, instantly analyzed by his internal systems. He masks his true appearance with an unidentified flesh-like material.
