= Morlun =

- Morlun; Art by John Romita Jr.

Publication information
- Publisher: Marvel Comics
- First appearance: The Amazing Spider-Man vol. 2 #30 (June 2001)
- Created by: J. Michael Straczynski; John Romita Jr.

In-story information
- Species: Psychic vampire
- Place of origin: Loomworld (Earth-001)
- Team affiliations: Inheritors
- Notable aliases: Devourer of Totems
- Abilities: Superhuman strength, speed, durability, stamina, agility, and reflexes; Life force energy absorption; Extended longevity; Teleportation; Power absorption (only for people with Spider-Powers

Morlun (/ˈmɔːrlən/) is a supervillain appearing in American comic books published by Marvel Comics. Created by J. Michael Straczynski and John Romita Jr., the character first appeared in The Amazing Spider-Man vol. 2 #30 (June 2001).

Morlun is a central foe of all the themed versions of Spider-Man, being one of their most powerful and dangerous adversaries. He is an entity from Earth-001 that hunts all the Spider-Totems by traveling to the many universes of Marvel Comics. He is best known as the temporary killer of the Earth-616 Spider-Man in the storyline "Spider-Man: The Other", and is also the main antagonist of the "Spider-Verse" storyline in which he and his estranged family, the Inheritors, attempt to kill all the versions of Spider-Man, as prophesied by him.

== Publication history ==
Morlun first appeared in The Amazing Spider-Man vol. 2 #30 (June 2001), created by writer J. Michael Straczynski and penciler John Romita Jr. This story is collected in Amazing Spider-Man Vol. 1: Coming Home.Regarding Morlun's design, Romita Jr. has stated that he initially designed Morlun to resemble what he had envisioned as a inter-dimensional biker. It was only after Straczynski's request to make him more "British-looking" that Romita Jr. gave him what he has regarded as the "aristocratic British-look" that Morlun sports, having based his design on the movie portrayals of Dracula by actors Bela Lugosi, John Carradine and Christopher Lee.

== Fictional character biography ==
=== First encounter with Spider-Man ===
When Spider-Man met a similarly powered man named Ezekiel Sims, Ezekiel explained to him that Spider-Man's powers were not an accident, and that the spider that had bitten him did so voluntarily to pass its abilities onto Peter before it died. This made Spider-Man a "totem", a bridge between man and beast, with the properties of both. Ezekiel then warned Spider-Man that as a totem, he was in danger from those who would seek to destroy such beings. One of those, who showed up soon after, was Morlun.

Little is known about exactly what Morlun is and where he comes from. According to Ezekiel, as long as totemistic forces have walked the earth, there have also been those who have fed on them. While Morlun and his brothers (it is unknown how many there are in existence, but it is known that Morlun is not the only one) can subsist on the life forces of normal humans and non-totemistic superhumans for a time, they always crave a pure host and Peter fits the bill perfectly.

After Peter's meeting with Ezekiel, Morlun and his hapless minion Dex subtly began tormenting Peter from the shadows, stalking him and wreaking havoc with his spider-sense. Morlun finally revealed himself when Spider-Man was investigating a fire at the wharfs, punching him with what Spider-Man claimed was the hardest punch he had ever felt. Morlun then told Spider-Man that he would eventually kill him, and now that they had made physical contact, he could find Spider-Man wherever he went. Though Spider-Man fought back, Morlun continually regained the upper hand. Peter tried to flee, but Morlun was able to find him easily and resume the fight. Spider-Man finally got away after Morlun burned down the building they were fighting in, but Ezekiel told him it was no use. Morlun would find him once again, and kill him.

Morlun continually attacked Spider-Man over the next few days, endangering the lives of innocent citizens if Peter tried to flee. With Ezekiel's help, Peter managed to briefly escape with a sample of Morlun's blood, which he discovered contained the DNA of every genus in the animal kingdom. Realizing that Morlun's DNA was pure, Peter found a weakness he could exploit. Luring Morlun to a nuclear power plant, Spider-Man injected himself with a dose of radiation that would kill a normal human being, but was only enough to weaken him due to the radiation already in his blood. When Morlun arrived, he prepared to feed, only to be burned instead by the radiation in Peter's blood. Peter explained that he was not a pure spider totem as Morlun had guessed due to the spider that bit him having been previously subjected to a dose of radiation, and that while Morlun could feed on the spider, he could not digest the radiation. Absorbing the radiation rather than his spider-powers with every punch Peter threw at him, Morlun began to disintegrate, and he negotiated with Spider-Man to spare his life, saying he was merely doing what was necessary for his survival, and that it was nothing personal. While Peter debated whether or not to let a monster like Morlun continue to live, Dex suddenly appeared and shot Morlun, causing him to crumble to dust.

=== The Other ===
In the Spider-Man: The Other storyline Morlun plagues Spider-Man by sudden and mysterious appearances, warning him that he is going to finish him. Spider-Man, for a reason not explainable by science, was dying, and Morlun wished to watch the causes and effects of his ailment. In a climactic battle, Morlun beats Spider-Man badly, ripping out one of his eyeballs, but leaves when the police arrive, opting for a more appropriate time to absorb Spider-Man's life force, leaving the web slinger on the verge of death.

Returning soon thereafter, Morlun enters Spider-Man's room in the Emergency Ward and prepares to feast, apparently unconcerned about the presence of the Avengers in the hospital. Mary Jane, who arrives at Peter's room just as Morlun is about to feed, tries to stop him, but he casually breaks her forearm and throws her off to one side. Spider-Man suddenly springs to life in a ferocious display of new powers, including stingers sprouting from his arms that he used to pin Morlun down, and fangs that he uses to rip Morlun's throat out. Morlun apparently dies once again, crumbling to dust.

=== Dark Reign ===
During the "Dark Reign" storyline, a secret group resurrects Morlun so that he can devour the Panther totem in danger with the Black Panther gravely injured and in turn weaken the nation of Wakanda. As a start, Morlun slays the long-term Panther adversary Man-Ape. He was defeated by the new Black Panther Shuri, who, with the help of a witch-doctor, sent Morlun into limbo as a sacrifice to ensure that T'Challa could be safely restored to health, where he was forced to battle the endless hordes of Death.

=== Original Sin ===
During the Original Sin storyline, Morlun senses the opening of the vault into which a girl named Cindy Moon was imprisoned, following her being bitten by the same spider that gave Spider-Man his superhuman abilities. Morlun refers to Moon as the Spider-Bride and the spinner at the center of the web.

=== Staging Ground ===
In the 2014 book Spider-Man: Staging Ground, Morlun later appears alive, as he travels to Earth-311 and kills and drains the life essence of that universe's Spider-Man, Peter Parquagh.

=== Spider-Verse ===
During the Spider-Verse storyline, Morlun's mysterious past was revealed that he is from a universe designated Earth-001 and that Morlun and his estranged family known as the Inheritors took part in a battle against the Master Weaver and succeeded in capturing it at the cost of the life of the Inheritors unnamed matriarch. With the power of the Master Weaver, they conquer Earth-001. They then used the Master Weaver's powers to travel between dimensions and hunt all Spider-Totem avatars. Morlun, along with the Inheritors, have been shown killing several alternate universe versions of Spider-Man, some of which are witnessed by Spider-UK, a spider-themed member of the Captain Britain Corps. Spider-UK sets out to travel through the web of life in order to save all the remaining Spider-Men from the Inheritors. Later, Morlun kills Spider-Man 2099's counterpart, and as he tries to arrive on Earth-616, the portal closes and Morlun expresses fear of the Earth-616 Spider-Man following their last fight. Spider-Man 2099 leaves and warns Peter Parker to let him know what happened. Meanwhile, the Inheritors massive dinner-table laden with crippled Spider-Totems are waiting for Morlun as he returns carrying Spider-Totem. Morlun is furious with his brother, Daemos had hunting on Earth-616 tells him it is his Spider-Totem as they fight until their father, Solus, intimidates them. Solus reminds them that he has known all along where the Bride, the Other, and the Scion are located, and about a prophecy that will bring the downfall of the Inheritors. He asks his son what is his desire. Morlun responds that his wish is to be his father's chosen heir, the Great Web is his legacy and obligation. Solus corrects him stating that the Web is all things and everywhere and that it is their kingdom making them the Inheritors of all creation.

Morlun and the Inheritors invade Earth-13, where a large group of Spider-Men are gathered to battle. The Inheritors cannot face the power of Captain Universe's version Spider-Man, who destroys the Inheritors members, but reveal that all the Inheritors members can regenerate from a cloning process on alternate universe Earth-802, which explains Morlun's mysterious resurrections from the dead twice. When his father, Solus, depowered, kills Captain Universe, the safe zone is eventually compromised, Morlun then grabs Spider-Girl's infant brother, Benjy and proclaims him as the Spider-Scion.

While Morlun is heading toward the teleporter with Benjy, Solus attacks the Spider-Men on Earth-13 while all Spider-Men flee to find the new safe zone. Later, Morlun asks his twins Bora and Brix to hold Benjy as he had other work to do. Morlun, expected at the dinner-table with his servant version of Jessica Drew, was unaware that she is actually Earth-616's Spider-Woman and had infiltrated and was permanently in Earth-001. Spider-Woman confronts the Master Weaver in prison and he gives the scroll of prophecy to her that may hold the key to stopping the instigated Inheritors. She then teleports the scroll to the Spider-Men. Kaine and Spider-Man's clone versions destroy the clone facility on Earth-802 so that the Inheritors cannot revive from clones again. The Inheritors sense that Silk and Kaine arrived on Earth-001 as they pursue Spider-Totems for the ritual. Morlun and the Inheritors battle Kaine and transforms into a spider monster of the Other and kills their father, Solus. Morlun and Daemos look on in horror as they manage to subdue him and then take him to the ritual.

In the final confrontation, the Spider-Men had overpowered the Inheritors and stop the ritual to end them all, although Superior Spider-Man kills the Master Weaver so that the Inheritors cannot travel between dimensions with their powers. Enraged, Morlun tries to attack Peter Parker of Earth-616, but he uses the teleporter to trap Morlun on Earth-3145, a world decimated by a nuclear explosion arguing that he is not killing Morlun as he is prepared to die there as well and Morlun could reach a nearby fallout bunker erected by the local Ezekiel Sims to keep the local Spider-Totem safe for protection. However, Peter is subsequently rescued by Silk, leaving Morlun and the other Inheritors trapped on Earth-3145. Before all Spider-Men can return to their home dimensions, Silk asks Karn (who became the new Master Weaver) if Morlun and the Inheritors will be able to survive without Spider-Totems. The Master Weaver remarks that Morlun and the Inheritors are feeding on only surviving life-forms on Earth-3145 which happens to be mutated spiders.

=== Spider-Geddon ===
As the Master Weaver and Spider-Man UK monitored from the former Loomworld (Earth-001), they realized that providing robots to check in on the Inheritors have allowed Jennix to generate an inter-dimensional transmitter and that the simultaneous detection of a clone generation engine with personality transference has appeared on Earth-616 enabling the potential for the Inheritors to escape. The clone generation engine was designed by Dr. Octopus of Earth-616, who perfected both Earth-616 Miles Warren's cloning technology with the Ultimate Template (that created his new body at the end of the Clone Conspiracy) and Jennix of the Inheritors' clone engine.

After sending in the Web Warriors consisting of Spider-Gwen, Spider-Ham, Spider-Man UK, Spider-Man Noir, Miles Morales/Spider-Man of Earth-616 and Octavia Otto of Earth-1104 to confront Superior Octopus, it became apparent that Jennix bested Doctor Octopus by creating an endless loop monitoring the clone generator enabling a mutagen to override the clone templates that were initially infused with Doctor Octopus and Peter Parker's current genetic make-up. The transmission allowed Morlun to escape from Earth-3145 and to regenerate his new body on Earth-616. Morlun immediately drained the life force and killed Spider-Man Noir, before Jennix and their sister Verna also appeared through the clone regeneration engine onto Earth-616 where Verna killed Spider-UK. The Inheritors declared that they plan to make Earth-616, as the new epicentre of their empire. Rather than rebuild, Morlun's immediate focus is to avenge his three losses to Earth-616 Peter Parker much to the dismay of Jennix. Verna tells Jennix to let Morlun have his fun.

Morlun travels to Earth-616, where he attacks Spider-Man when he's tired. While fighting, Spider-Man calls J. Jonah Jameson to get a wrist watch that will signal reinforcements. Morlun catches up to Spider-Man, and is about to kill him when Miles Morales arrives, and helps fend off Morlun. Spider-Man tells Miles to go away, and that he will meet him soon. After Miles leaves, Spider-Man tricks Morlun into entering a cage and shoots him with tranquilizer darts. With Morlun defeated, Spider-Man tells Morlun that he lost because he is too arrogant, and will never beat him. At the end of Spider-Geddon, Morlun is the only Inheritor left due to his family being turned into babies.

=== Last Remains ===
During the "Last Remains" storyline, Morlun has escaped from his imprisonment and is feeding off the spiders in the sewers. After stealing the spider-virus that Spider-Queen once used to turn Manhattan into Spider-Island, Sin-Eater exposes some of his remaining followers with the Spider-Virus turning them into Man-Spiders. This was enough to attract Morlun to their location. Sin-Eater confronts Morlun and shoots him, stealing his powers and knocking him out. After Sin-Eater is defeated, Morlun regains his powers.

=== Sinister War ===
During the "Sinister War" storyline, Kindred resurrects Sin-Eater. Several demonic centipedes emerge from Sin-Eater's body, with one of them possessing Morlun. However, he is knocked out by Doctor Octopus' machine, which disposes of the centipedes.

=== End of the Spider-Verse ===
Morlun wakes up and decides to go back to Loomworld to free his family. However, Morlun finds out Spider-Ma'am ate his family and kills her in a rage. He confronts Shathra, but is easily defeated and is forced to team up with Julia Carpenter and Anya Corazon. He meets up with Peter Parker and after a misunderstanding where Miles Morales, Silk, Jessica Drew had to help Peter, they eventually let Morlun join their side. Morlun plans to stab Shathra with a totem dagger, which will erase her connection to the Great Web of Life and Destiny. When Morlun confronts Shathra and tries to stab her, it does not work because the totem dagger only works on spider totems. The Inheritors are revealed to be Totems themselves, imbued with the power to drain the life force of others and representing the leech. Morlun tries to kill Silk to gain more power, but Silk slashes him with the totem dagger, which resurrects all the spider totems he had killed. Morlun, heavily weakened, escapes to regain his strength.

== Powers and abilities ==
Morlun has the ability to drain the life force from other beings through physical contact. Depending on the power of the individual he drains, his powers and vitality can increase substantially.

Morlun possesses superhuman attributes, such as superhuman strength, speed, durability, stamina, agility, and reflexes. Spider-Man states that Morlun hits harder than any foe he had ever battled. When facing the Black Panther, Morlun survived vibranium-core nuclear-tipped shells fired at him and tore through an adamantium net, while in his fight with Spider-Man he survived being inside an exploding building with the only sign he had been present at the explosion being that his clothing and hair were incinerated, his hair returning to its usual length by the time the sun rose a few hours later. Morlun's physical speed, stamina, agility, and reflexes are sufficiently heightened to enable him to keep up with Spider-Man, as well as allowing him to climb several flights of stairs and cover several blocks in only slightly more time than it takes Spider-Man to reach the same destination by web-swinging.

Morlun has existed for centuries, if not longer, and is a relentless and remorseless stalker. Once Morlun has physically touched somebody, that person is permanently "imprinted" in Morlun's senses, allowing him to track them down from anywhere on Earth.

== Reception ==
=== Accolades ===
- In 2020, CBR.com ranked Morlun 9th in their "Marvel: 10 Famous Villains From The 2000s To Bring Back" list and included him in their "Spider-Man: The Best New Villains of the Century" list.
- In 2022, Screen Rant ranked Morlun 1st in their "10 Most Powerful Silk Villains In Marvel Comics" list and included him in their "15 Most Powerful Black Panther Villains" list.
- In 2022, CBR.com ranked Morlun 2nd in their "Spider-Man's 10 Coolest Villains" list and 4th in their "10 Most Violent Spider-Man Villains" list.

== Other versions ==
- In the 5-issue limited series continuation of Spider-Man: The Animated Series titled Spider-Man '94, written by J. M. DeMatteis with art by Jim Towe, Morlun appears as the main antagonist. This version is the sole survivor and heir to the ancient kingdom of Lokka, who has wondered the Earth for millennia, and having adopted numerous identities, the latest being Ezekiel Sims. This version is also the creator of Kaine.

== In other media ==
- Morlun appears as a boss in Spider-Man Unlimited, voiced by Travis Willingham.
- Morlun appears as a boss in Marvel: Avengers Alliance.
