= One More Day (comics) =

2007 four-part Spider-Man comic book crossover storyline

- Cover for The Amazing Spider-Man #545, the final chapter of the story arc. Art by Joe Quesada.
- Publisher: Marvel Comics
- Publication date: November 2007 – January 2008
- Genre: Superhero; Crossover
Title(s)
The Amazing Spider-Man #544–545
Friendly Neighborhood Spider-Man #24
Sensational Spider-Man (vol. 2) #41
- Main character(s): Spider-Man; Mary Jane Watson; Aunt May; Mephisto

Creative team
- Writer(s): J. Michael Straczynski; Joe Quesada (The Amazing Spider-Man #545)
- Penciller: Joe Quesada
- Inker(s): Danny Miki; Joe Quesada (The Amazing Spider-Man #545)
- Letterer: Chris Eliopoulos
- Colorist(s): Richard Isanove; Dean White (The Amazing Spider-Man #545)
- Editor(s): Axel Alonso; Daniel Ketchum; Joe Quesada
- Hardcover: ISBN 0-7851-2633-3
- Softcover: ISBN 0-7851-2634-1

"One More Day" (OMD) is a four-part 2007 comic book crossover storyline, connecting the three main Spider-Man series published by Marvel Comics at the time. Written by J. Michael Straczynski and Joe Quesada, with art by Quesada, the story arc concludes the fallout of Spider-Man's actions during the 2007 Civil War crossover. "One More Day" starts in The Amazing Spider-Man #544, continues in Friendly Neighborhood Spider-Man #24 and The Sensational Spider-Man (vol. 2) #41, and concludes in The Amazing Spider-Man #545.

After Aunt May had been shot by a stray bullet from a goon of the Kingpin meant for Spider-Man, Spider-Man seeks help to save her life. He encounters the demon Mephisto, who offers to save her life if Spider-Man gives him his marriage. Spider-Man and his wife, Mary Jane Watson, agree, and this part of their history is erased so that, effectively, they have never been married. The storyline set the stage for a restructuring of the Spider-Man titles, resulting in the cancellation of Friendly Neighborhood Spider-Man and The Sensational Spider-Man, with The Amazing Spider-Man revamped as a thrice-monthly publication.

The events of "One More Day" regarding Peter Parker and Mary Jane's marriage was met with highly negative criticism, although the artwork received praise. Elements of the storyline were adapted in the feature film Spider-Man: No Way Home (2021), set in the Marvel Cinematic Universe (MCU).

== Publication history ==
Marvel Comics editor-in-chief Joe Quesada felt dissolving Peter Parker and Mary Jane Watson's marriage and returning Spider-Man to his roots was necessary to preserve the longevity of the character for the next 20 or 30 years. Quesada said he and other previous editors-in-chief had long been seeking an opportunity to begin a new methodology in which to tell Spider-Man stories, but had not found a reasonable way to do so. Quesada said "It's very easy to un-marry a character, or fix something like that: you just do a huge universal retcon, and say a few events in history didn't happen. But that's really not the way we do it here at Marvel." Quesada found an opportunity to address this in the events of the 2007 Civil War mini-series, which resulted in the unmasking of Spider-Man's identity to the public. Quesada knew J. Michael Straczynski was planning to end his run as a Marvel writer, so he personally approached Straczynski to propose "One More Day" as his final project.

The ideas for "One More Day" began to develop almost two years before its release, at one of Marvel's creative summits for creators and editors. Quesada, Straczynski, Brian Michael Bendis, Mark Millar, Jeph Loeb, Tom Brevoort and Axel Alonso developed the concept between them, and Ed Brubaker and Dan Slott added more at the next summit. "One More Day" was announced as the concluding storyline of Straczynski's run on Amazing Spider-Man in early 2007, and Quesada was named as the artist for the storyline. Although Quesada had become more selective in choosing projects to do as an artist since becoming editor-in-chief, he felt compelled to do the art for "One More Day" because he felt very close to the story, and because since he had been talking about the project for so long, he felt he "needed to put my money where my mouth is."

While no plot details were given, Marvel issued a promotional image in February that consisted solely of the line "What would you do... with one more day?" against a background of spider webbing. At a panel at San Diego Comic Con in June 2007, Joe Quesada gave few details about the story, but described it as "a Peter-MJ story." At the same panel, Marvel editor Tom Brevoort announced that Amazing Spider-Man would become the sole main Spider-Man title, and would be published three times a month.

Due to Quesada's known dislike of Mary Jane and Peter Parker's marriage, fans began to speculate he intended to dissolve their marriage in one form or another. Quesada felt that 1987's "The Wedding!" story happened due to an editorial decision, and that Jim Shooter mirrored events Stan Lee had planned for the Spider-Man comic strip in order to maximize any publicity generated.

Straczynski surprised many when he publicly revealed: "There's a lot that I don't agree with, and I made this very clear to everybody within shouting distance at Marvel, especially Joe Quesada... there was a point where I made the decision, and told Joe, that I was going to take my name off the last two issues of the OMD arc. Eventually, Joe talked me out of that decision because at the end of the day, I don't want to sabotage Joe or Marvel, and I have a lot of respect for both of those." Quesada explained this disagreement with Straczynski, stating that their rift was primarily over the "methodology" of how to erase Peter and Mary Jane's marriage, but Straczynski was on board with the editorial mandate of undoing the Parkers' marriage.

Various Marvel writers, including Brian Michael Bendis, Mark Millar, Ed Brubaker and incoming Amazing Spider-Man writer Dan Slott had a hand in developing the story. During the course of the story's development, Quesada claims that he and Straczynski made plans to resurrect Gwen Stacy alongside Harry Osborn in the final chapter. This plot twist was discarded after numerous Marvel editors and writers lobbied for the character to remain dead. According to Quesada, Straczynski's original script for the storyline's fourth issue involved changes to continuity going as far back as 1971. Peter would have helped Harry Osborn get into rehab for his drug addiction immediately, which would have allowed a number of rewrites. Mary Jane would have remained in a relationship with Harry, Gwen would not have been killed and ultimately Peter's marriage to Mary Jane would not have taken place. Quesada realized that these changes would have far-reaching consequences for both historical and forthcoming storylines, so he made the decision to change Straczynski's story. While Peter and Mary Jane were to have remained a couple for the purposes of back-story, they were simply not a married couple. Quesada also described "One More Day" as an emotional climax of sorts and resolution for the relationship between Peter Parker and Tony Stark, who had developed a father-son-like bond during the "Civil War" storyline. However, Quesada hinted the paths of the two characters could cross again in the future due to planned storylines for Iron Man.

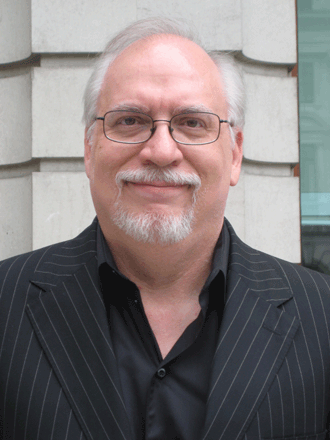
Co-writer J. Michael Straczynski. Straczynski disagreed with the direction the series ultimately took.

Quesada, answering questions for Comic Book Resources, said every story that happened in the Spider-Man canon still "counted", with the only change being that, due to the world's newly revised memories, Peter and Mary Jane did not marry due to some unknown incident and the official unmasking of his identity to the public during the 2007 Civil War mini-series has been forgotten. A "back and forth" developed between Quesada and J. Michael Straczynski in separate interviews and messages, with Straczynski outlining some of his original plans for the "retcon", and conversations he had with Quesada about the storyline. Quesada said "We're committed to preserving as much of these stories as is humanly possible," but he added the changing of certain elements is inevitable. For example, he sees the storyline in which Mary Jane was pregnant as never having happened. Also, Spider-Man lost the organic webshooters that he gained in the "Avengers Disassembled" storyline, and the other spider-like powers that he gained in the 2005–2006 storyline "The Other". Quesada commented that in removing those powers and bringing back Spider-Man's mechanical webshooters, he was returning "an element that [he] felt needed to be brought back into Peter's world," and that the "mechanical webshooters demonstrate Peter's ingenuity and overall smarts."

Quesada sees Peter's making a "deal with the Devil" as a villain (Mephisto) taking advantage of someone at his weakest moment. This, he feels, is a better resolution than Peter and Mary Jane getting divorced, which would indicate "they gave up on their love, that their life in love together was so awful, so stressful, so unfulfilling that they had to raise a red flag and walk away from it. They quit on their marriage and even more tragic, (they) quit on each other. Instead, we had them make a deal with the devil. 'Cause that isn't as bad." Quesada went on to say "Peter and MJ didn't quit on their love, they sacrificed it to save a life, that to me is a pretty heroic story."

=== Release and delays ===
The four issues that comprised "One More Day" were originally scheduled to ship weekly in August 2007. The story encountered delays due to Quesada's art duties conflicting with his job as editor-in-chief. Sensational Spider-Man (vol. 2) #41 was rescheduled for release in late October, and the concluding chapter of the story, Amazing Spider-Man #545, was rescheduled for November. The issues were again delayed in late October, with Sensational Spider-Man (vol. 2) #41 and Amazing Spider-Man #545 resolicited for release on November 28 and December 27, respectively.

== Plot ==
The infamous panel where Mephisto reveals he wants to remove Peter and Mary Jane's marriage.

The events of "One More Day" began in Amazing Spider-Man #544, where Peter Parker's Aunt May is shown slowly dying from a gunshot wound sustained during the events of Civil War and Back in Black. Peter is forced to ask Tony Stark for financial assistance as he is unemployed and then seeks counsel with Doctor Strange. The latter informs Peter that he can do nothing to grant Aunt May her life back. However, he helps Peter seek the aid of several others including Doctor Doom, the High Evolutionary, Reed Richards, and Doctor Octopus; none are able or willing to help him. A desperate Peter attempts to go back in time using a magic spell without Strange's approval, harming himself in the process. Strange heals his wounds and convinces him that all he can do is be by his aunt's side before she dies.

On his way to the hospital, Peter is confronted by a little girl who says she holds the answer to his problem before running off. While pursuing her, Peter encounters a group of men; a woman in red informs him that these are alternate versions of himself, from alternate timelines where he never became Spider-Man. The woman in red transforms into the demon Mephisto, who tells Peter he can save Aunt May. As payment, Mephisto wants not Peter's soul, but his marriage to Mary Jane Watson. Peter and Mary Jane are given until midnight the following night to decide their answer and, after several hours agonizing over the choice, they agree to the deal. Mary Jane also whispers to Mephisto another, unspecified offer. Before completing the deal, Mephisto spitefully reveals that the little girl was in fact Peter and Mary Jane's future daughter, who will now never exist because of the choice they made.

As Mephisto begins to change history, the two embrace for a final time. When the deal is complete, Peter wakes up alone in bed, once again living with Aunt May. He attends a party being held for his best friend Harry Osborn (previously thought to have died in Spectacular Spider-Man #200), who introduces Lilly Hollister and Carlie Cooper. Peter glimpses Mary Jane sadly leaving the party. The guests all toast to a "Brand New Day".

== Reception ==
"One More Day" was widely panned by both fans and critics alike. IGN reviewer Jesse Schedeen described Amazing Spider-Man #545 as "undoubtedly the worst comic Marvel published in 2007" and a "deus ex machina of the highest order." He did admit that writer Straczynski "had a great handle on the Peter/Mary Jane dynamic," making their potentially final moments mean something, and that Quesada's artistic style made sense given the dark tone. However, he also dismissed the story as "infuriating and downright disrespectful to anyone who has come to love Spider-Man comics over the years." IGN published two "Additional Take" reviews for Amazing Spider-Man #545. Bryan Joel said that he had been a "vocal supporter" of "Brand New Day", but summarized the OMD story as "flip, weightless, and painfully brief." Richard George stated that "One More Day" "could prove to be the best example of editorial influence gone horribly, horribly wrong" and "in trying to preserve the appeal of Peter Parker, Joe Quesada has actually managed to fundamentally undermine the character." Both Joel and George agreed with their colleague in complimenting Quesada's artwork. Tim Marchman of The Wall Street Journal stated that having Spider-Man make a deal with the devil-like Mephisto is "the rough equivalent of having Z-movie director Uwe Boll film a studio-funded prequel to Martin Scorsese's Taxi Driver."

Spider-Man co-creator Stan Lee praised the storyline and what he perceived as the courage its creators showed in so drastically changing a popular and well-established character. Lee said changes are needed to keep a series fresh and compared the criticism from fans to the backlash Marvel Comics received when Peter Parker and Mary Jane Watson married in the first place. The Spider-Man newspaper strip adopted the "One More Day" retcon in its version of "Brand New Day" (along with "The Wedding!", one of just three stories to appear in both the Spider-Man comic book and newspaper strip), but reader reaction to the erasing of Peter and Mary Jane's marriage was so negative that Lee, who wrote the strip, opted to conclude the story by revealing that it was in fact a bad dream. As such, Peter remains married to Mary Jane in the newspaper strip continuity.

In a roundtable review at Newsarama, J. Caleb Mozzocco agreed that Spider-Man was easier to relate to while young and single, but that retconning the marriage of Spider-Man was unnecessary due to the existence of titles such as Ultimate Spider-Man and Marvel Adventures Spider-Man. He found the story confusing, wondering how this retcon made sense in the larger Marvel Universe, as Spider-Man played important roles in New Avengers and "Civil War". Kevin Huxford claimed, "you can feel editorial mandate dripping from this" and called the story "utterly ridiculous," while Lucas Siegel criticized Quesada's decision to have heroic Peter Parker make a "deal with the Devil" for selfish reasons. Richard Renteria felt that the story's conclusion was a missed opportunity "to add a new layer of guilt to Peter's already rocky life by allowing May to finally have the send off she deserves," while Troy Brownfield felt that the storyline damaged Marvel continuity and Spider-Man's decision was "selfish and childish," not to mention "a big middle finger to the idea of marriage in comics." He speculated preferable endings to the story before concluding, "As it stands, Peter, MJ, May ... and the readers ... all got a raw deal." A more positive view came from Brandon Thomas, who felt that "One More Day" was "an incredibly well-told story." He praised the writing, in particular the morally ambiguous decision Peter has to make and the way he and Mary Jane deal with it together, as well as Quesada's art, which he felt set the tone of "guilt, regret, and despair." In regards to the change made in Spider-Man canon, he said, "Peter Parker being married really isn't a vital component of the mythos" and that it allowed Marvel to make "big, sweeping changes to bring things slightly more into focus and back on message."

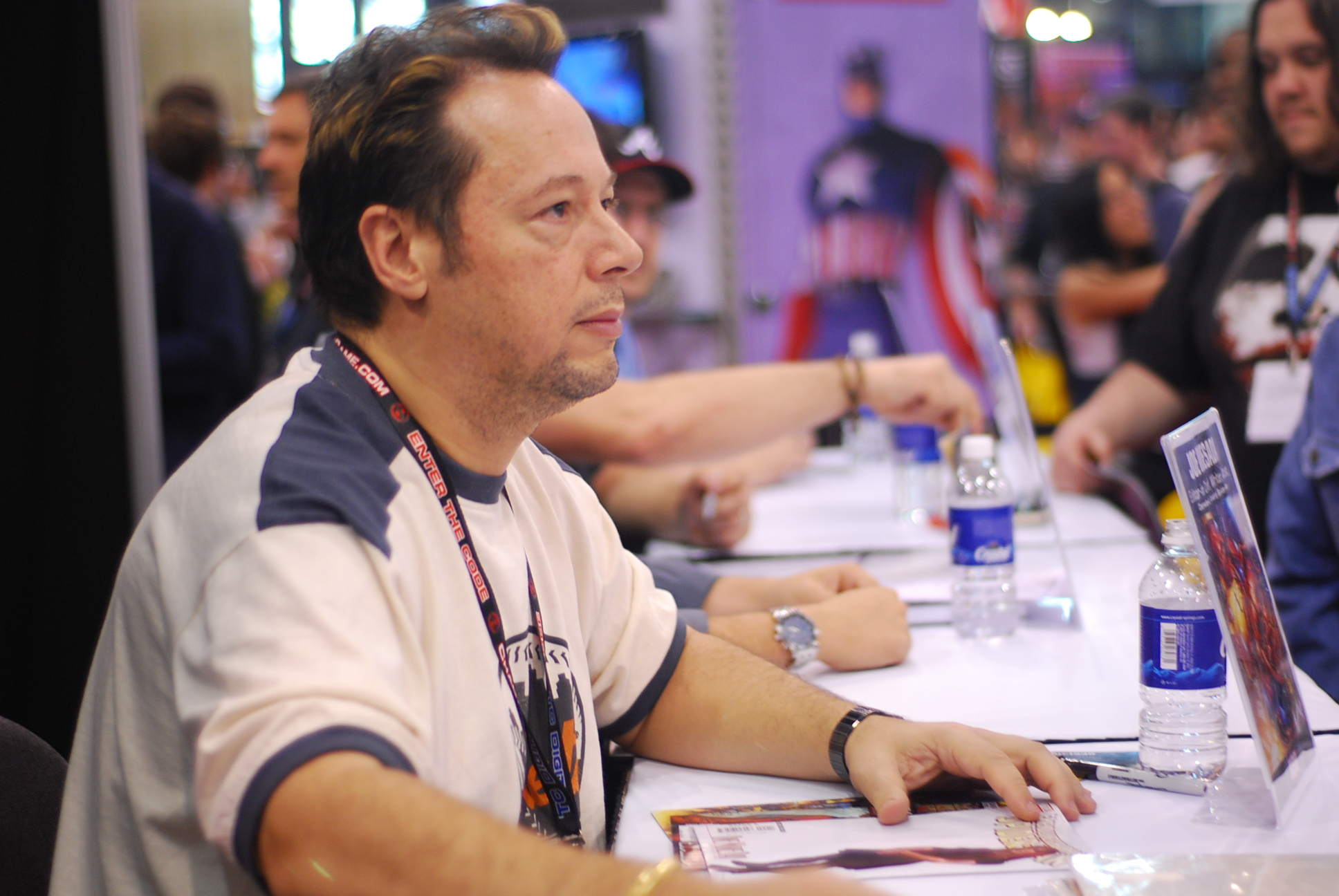
Joe Quesada, co-writer and penciller. Wizard felt his artistic decisions enhanced the series.

Wizard praised the artwork, specifically the way Quesada differentiated visually between the dark and light tones before and after the retcon. However, they felt "the entire set up and execution just doesn't make sense" and failed to empathize with the characters and their decisions. They criticized the use of magic in a largely science-based book, calling it "the biggest cheat since Dallas." They also felt that the concept of making Spider-Man more accessible was undermined by the new and unfamiliar characters.

In their coverage of the storyline, UK Television's Channel 4 News also compared the reaction to "One More Day" to that of Dallas, claiming, "This controversial issue of the comic has been flying off the shelves but reaction from readers has been venomous." Channel 4 speculated that the reason for the storyline was to make the comics more similar to the financially successful films and merchandise.

Comic book historian Peter Sanderson criticized the story for using a supernatural element to retcon the marriage and not maturely dealing with the issue of divorce, arguing the writers had forgotten stories where Spider-Man dealt with his causing the death of Uncle Ben, drugs and child abuse. He wrote, "I expect there are people who are professional comics writers and editors, and people who will someday become professional comics writers and editors, who are outraged that Marvel had Spider-Man make a deal with the devil. And these present and future writers and editors will be determined to undo it. We shall see whether it takes twenty years this time, or much less." He found the story better than the Clone Saga in the respect that it altered an aspect of canon, instead of erasing it entirely. He also criticized the idea of a hero making a deal with one as evil as Mephisto, effectively the devil.

The direct sales estimates for the initial month of publication for the first issue of the storyline, Amazing Spider-Man #544, was 146,215, putting it in second place after "World War Hulk". This dropped to 110,405 with Friendly Neighborhood Spider-Man #24, 100,300 (and seventh position in number of sales) for The Sensational Spider-Man #41 and the conclusion to the storyline, The Amazing Spider-Man #545, was ranked second with estimated sales of 124,481.

== Subsequent direction ==
=== Immediate aftermath ===
Marvel posted a sneak peek at the final pages of the first post-"One More Day" issue, Amazing Spider-Man #546, and a two-page spread penciled by John Romita Jr. entitled "Spider-Man: The New Status Quo!", which established the new continuity of Spider-Man. The retcon brings back Harry Osborn from the dead (in this new continuity, instead of having been dead he had been living in Europe for many years), and explains that although Spider-Man unmasked himself during the events of the "Civil War" storyline, no one remembers who was behind the mask. Although Quesada would initially take the position that the changes to the timeline did not have to be explained since they were the result of magic, subsequent writers would, in short order, provide detailed, in-continuity explanations for the changes.

In 2010, Quesada wrote a sequel storyline, "One Moment in Time". This story established that the only actual change Mephisto wrought upon the timeline was allowing a criminal to escape custody, causing a butterfly effect that prevented Peter and Mary Jane's marriage as Peter was delayed in reaching the wedding, prompting Peter and MJ to reconsider marriage. The storyline also established that May was saved by Doctor Strange, despite Strange saying during "One More Day" that it was beyond his power to save her, who also worked with Iron Man and Mister Fantastic to create a mass mind-wipe across the globe to protect Peter's identity, using Extremis as a dispersal system to simultaneously erase Spider-Man's identity and establish a 'psychic blindspot' that prevents anyone from realizing that Peter Parker is Spider-Man, regardless of the evidence they might discover, unless Peter is unmasked in front of them. This 'blindspot' was lost during the events of the "Spider-Island" storyline, in which Peter used his powers publicly. Peter explained this by saying that he was one of many people infected with a virus that gave them Spider-Man's powers, Strange noting that this loophole means that people can now deduce Peter's identity even if they do not remember Peter's prior unmasking.

The 2015 miniseries The Amazing Spider-Man: Renew Your Vows, which ties into the Secret Wars storyline, depicts Spider-Man and Mary Jane married with a daughter named Annie (who is developing Spider powers of her own). In the post-Secret Wars Marvel Universe, Mary Jane and Peter appear to retain some memory of their Renew Your Vows counterparts even as the timeline continues.

Having been killed twice by Deadpool in Spider-Man/Deadpool #5, Peter Parker finds himself face-to-face with Mephisto. "I am the architect of your ultimate fall," the supernatural villain whispers in Peter's ear. "And I'm going to tell you a secret about your life... about why you'll never find true happiness..." "You will always be missing something," "Incomplete. Unfinished. And ultimately, no matter how hard you fight, which cause you choose, the battle will always end with your facing... emptiness."

In Amazing Spider-Man #795, when Loki offers Spider-Man the chance to bring back his deceased loved ones, Spider-Man argues, "Yeah, well, I can't shake the feeling that at some point I said yes to an offer like this from someone like you. And lost something... important... because of it." Mephisto appears behind Spider-Man when he states this.

As part of the Fresh Start relaunch event, Peter Parker and Mary Jane began to reconnect.

=== Developments in the early 2020s ===
The 2020 storyline "Last Remains" and its subsequent fallout furthered the One More Day connections in the storylines, as the mysterious demon, a.k.a. Kindred, shows his hand and uses his powers to revive the Sin-Eater and possess several of Spider-Man's allies, turning them against him and all of New York City. Peter goes to Doctor Strange for assistance, but Strange discovers something is wrong with Peter's soul.

Peter ultimately travels to Kindred's lair, where his foe is revealed to be Harry Osborn. Harry tortures Peter, determined to force a confession out of him for some unknown sin, which Peter has no recollection of. Mary Jane, working in tandem with Norman Osborn, helps to capture Kindred. Despite Harry's capture, questions still remain as to precisely what he wanted. Mary Jane tells Peter they will face these problems together.

Meanwhile, Doctor Strange, determined to uncover what has tampered with Peter's soul, seeks answers from Mephisto himself. The conversation is followed up on during the events of the Sinister War, where Strange argues that Peter would 'never' strike a bargain with the devil and demands he undo the deal. Mephisto states that his hands are presently tied, and then challenges Stephen to a game of chance, with potentially more information revealed if Stephen wins.

The Sinister War story provided further revelation, connecting Mephisto to the backstories of the Osborn family. Norman at an early stage of his career was finding himself frequently in debt and losing money, Mephisto agrees to help Norman out in exchange for his son's soul. Norman gives Mephisto what he wants, and in doing so subjects Harry to a lifetime of mental instability that ultimately costs him his life, and, per Mephisto's claim, ultimately condemns him to hell.

In a final battle with Gabriel and Sarah Stacy as the Kindred, Peter fights against them which results in the death of Harry Osborn's clone while saving Norman. Meanwhile, Doctor Strange decides to gamble with Mephisto to free Harry Osborn's soul, selecting Peter and MJ as his champions, and succeeds; the show of unbreakable love between Peter and MJ ultimately exorcises Mephisto from the twins, allowing them to degenerate and pass on for a final time freed from Mephisto's grasp. The conclusion of the overall Kindred Saga reveals Mephisto's true motivation for the events of "One More Day", the demon is haunted by visions of his inevitable reign over the Earth being thwarted by the heroic efforts of either Peter Parker or his daughter, Spider-Girl. His deal with the Parkers was intended to prevent at least one version of this future from happening.

In 2022's sixth volume of Amazing Spider-Man written by Zeb Wells, the decision to dissolve Peter and MJ's relationship once again was met with criticism from fans and critics. During the run, Marvel editor Nick Lowe responded to multiple fan requests to undo "One More Day". In Vol. 6 #35, when a fan asked if they got a lot of hate mail from the storyline, Lowe claimed, "We get fan mail, but we certainly don't get a lot of mail about "One More Day". That came out fifteen years ago... Most months, we don't get any letters about "One More Day". When we do a story with Peter and MJ, we sometimes get a dozen emails from fans who want them married again, like you. We get more letters from people talking about other things altogether!" In #38, he responds to a fan complaint about their relationship with, "I wouldn't hold your breath for "One More Day" to be undone anytime soon. I'll never say never, of course, because life is life."

=== 2026 and onwards ===
Mephisto went onto be a central figure in a story arc for Chip Zdarsky's run on Captain America and was teased to be of importance at the end of his Avengers Armageddon event, which ended with Tony Stark using Doctor Doom's What-If Machine to see what will happen if the Avengers refuse to change—in response, the machine shows him a sword-wielding Mephisto holding up a battered Spider-Man. Stark declares the vision before him to be "the key to everything." Meanwhile to Armageddon in Captain America Vol 14 #15, as Steve Rogers finds himself caught between Doctor Doom and Mephisto in Hell as part of the former's machinations, Mephisto attempts to tempt Rogers into making a deal with him to sell him his soul. In exchange for his soul, Mephisto offers to fill the world with democracies and, as he speaks alludes to One More Day, remarking that Rogers "wouldn't be the first good man to make a deal with me," which the comic pairs with an image of Spider-Man in New York.

In Captain America Vol 14 #16, Doctor Doom manages to overthrow Mephisto as the ruler of Hell, declaring in the process that all of Mephisto's contracts are null and void. As the world begins to change, Spider-Man is seen on Earth, feeling that something is happening. Fans quickly began to speculate that, between the ending of Amageddon and the events of Captain America #16, Marvel was preparing to 'undo' One More Day in some form. Indeed, Marvel had teased at New York Comic Con a new event entitled "1 Day" for June 2027 with a tagline that read in part "TOMORROW IS ONE DAY AWAY," which fueled speculation. Further fueling speculation were reveals that Spider-Man, Mary Jane, Aunt May, and Mephisto would all be involved in Zdarsky's run on The Avengers. In an interview, Zdarsky ultimately confirmed that the deal from One More Day had been impacted by Doom's actions, teasing "There's going to be some ripples there." However, he reminded his readers that he was not writing Amazing Spider-Man and was focused on writing an Avengers story in which he "was playing with it [One More Day] a little bit."

== In other media ==
=== Film ===
Elements of "One More Day", alongside the 2010 "One Moment in Time" and the 2014–15 "Spider-Verse" story arcs, are adapted in the 2021 Marvel Cinematic Universe (MCU) feature film Spider-Man: No Way Home, which features Peter Parker (Tom Holland) attempting to have Stephen Strange (Benedict Cumberbatch) wipe the world's collective knowledge of his secret identity (revealed by Mysterio) from their minds using a spell, only to unleash various villains from the wider multiverse when he tries to alter it so his friends and family remember he is Spider-Man. Though Mary Jane does not appear and is not married to Peter in this version, the spell Peter has Strange use in the climax to instead have the world forget about Peter in general costs him his relationships with his best friend Ned Leeds, and girlfriend Michelle "MJ" Jones-Watson. While Aunt May (Marisa Tomei) does die in the film, her death is not reversed from the spell since it didn't change history like Mephisto did in the comics.

=== Video games ===
- In Ultimate Marvel vs. Capcom 3, if Spider-Man defeats Firebrand from the Ghosts 'n Goblins games, he says, "You know, you sort of look like the guy who ruined my marriage...".
- In Marvel Rivals, when Spider-Man talks to an alternate Daredevil about his decision to free Yinglong to help him control the Beast, Daredevil mentions that his version of Spider-Man made a deal with Mephisto to save his marriage and his daughter.

== Collected editions ==
The story has been collected into a single volume, One More Day, with an afterword by Stan Lee. The 112-page volume collects Amazing Spider-Man #544–545, Sensational Spider-Man #41, Friendly Neighborhood Spider-Man #24 and Marvel Spotlight: "Spider-Man - One More Day/Brand New Day". The hardcover was published April 2008 (ISBN 0-7851-2633-3), and the softcover in August 2008. (ISBN 0-7851-2634-1).

== In popular culture ==
In Action Comics #1050, Lex Luthor became convinced that the world needs a Superman, but he doesn't believe Superman should be seen on the same level as humans. He uses telepath Manchester Black's hypnotic powers to broadcast a worldwide mental message resulting in most of the world losing their knowledge of Superman's civilian identity and the death of Manchester Black. When confronted by Superman, Luthor references the Marvel story, by commenting that he at least was nice enough to let Superman keep his marriage after wiping the world's memories, but questioning the existence of his son, infuriating him more.
