= Spider-Man/Black Cat: The Evil that Men Do =

American comic book

Spider-Man and the Black Cat: The Evil That Men Do
- Cover of Spider-Man and the Black Cat: The Evil That Men Do #1, art by Terry and Rachel Dodson

Publication information
- Publisher: Marvel Comics
- Schedule: Irregular
- Format: Limited series
- Genre: Superhero
- Publication date: August 2002 – March 2006
- No. of issues: 6
- Main character(s): Felicia Hardy / Black Cat; Peter Parker / Spider-Man

Creative team
- Written by: Kevin Smith
- Penciller: Terry Dodson
- Inker: Rachel Dodson
- Colorist: Lee Loughridge

Spider-Man and the Black Cat: The Evil That Men Do, also written as Spider-Man/Black Cat: The Evil That Men Do and known simply as Spider-Man and the Black Cat or Spider-Man/Black Cat, is a six-issue comic book limited series published by Marvel Comics starring the superhero Spider-Man and the Black Cat. The series was written by Kevin Smith and drawn by Terry Dodson and his wife Rachel. The series was notorious for its delays, with a three-year gap between the publication of the third and fourth issues, and has received criticism for its shift in tone following the hiatus.

== Publication history ==
Following his acclaimed runs on Daredevil and Green Arrow, Marvel Comics were eager to work with Kevin Smith, and he was planned to take over as writer on The Amazing Spider-Man. Terry Dodson, his profile growing after well-received stints on Generation X and Harley Quinn, would be the title's artist. While J. Michael Straczynski finished his work on Amazing Spider-Man, the new team were commissioned to work on a six-issue mini-series for the summer of 2002, planned to reintroduce Black Cat to readers after scant recent appearances. The first two issues shipped as planned in August, and September 2002. Smith intended to do his Marvel work alongside the Bennifer film Jersey Girl. However, there was a two-month delay before the third came out, and then as Smith moved onto preparing for Clerks II fell off the schedule entirely, and Straczynski instead remained as Amazing Spider-Man writer.

Smith was instead planned to switch to an ongoing Spider-Man title under the Marvel Knights banner in 2004, but after further scheduling differences this was given to Mark Millar. Instead Smith would eventually continue Spider-Man/Black Cat: The Evil That Men Do in 2005, with the fourth issue reaching stands in December - over three years after the previous edition. Ahead of the new material, Marvel published a reprint of the three issues to allow readers to catch up with the story. Smith expressed contrition for the script's late delays. Due to a clerical error, Smith was not paid in 2002 for issues #4-6, and was unaware until 2005; in an apology on his blog for the series' late delivery he wryly reflected "Justice, in some weird manner, has been served, I guess".

== Synopsis ==
The Black Cat, the former lover of Spider-Man, returns to New York City. Spider-Man himself is looking for a missing woman named Tricia, and investigating the death of Donald Phillips. Phillips was an honour roll student who died from a heroin overdose, despite a lack of evidence that he had ever used heroin. Spider-Man confronts a drug dealer, and learns of Mr. Brownstone - who is rumoured to molest teenaged boys - and a lackey, Hunter Todd. Felicia Hardy, the vigilante and thief Black Cat, is also looking for Tricia and meets up with Spider-Man. The two confront Hunter, whose girlfriend dies of a drug overdose. At the same moment, Brownstone is revealed as a concert violinist named Garrison Klum. Klum is on stage at Carnegie Hall. Spider-Man and Black Cat crash a party being held there as they confront and defeat the villain Scorpia. While Klum mugs for the camera, Spider-Man begins to suspect he is Brownstone. Spider-Man and Black Cat learn that Scorpia was hired by Alberto Ortega, the head of a local drug syndicate, to assassinate Klum. However, Klum kills the Ortega gang via heroin overdoses. Black Cat leaves Spider-Man after a disagreement on how to handle the case, but when she confronts Klum herself it is revealed that he is a mutant as he uses his powers to teleport a small quantity of heroin directly into her heart. Klum then starts cutting open her costume with the intention of raping her.

Black Cat waits in prison at Riker's Island, accused of Klum's murder. Matt Murdock, also known as Daredevil, tries to convince Felicia to undergo a rape kit; if she had been raped, Klum's death would be ruled as self-defence but Felicia denies being raped. Spider-Man and Daredevil decide to break Felicia out of prison; but Francis Klum - Garrison Klum's lackey and younger brother as well as a low-level psychic and teleporter - has already done so. He forces Daredevil and Spider-Man to fight, then teleports away with Felicia, leaving Daredevil and Spider-Man dazed. Spider-Man and Daredevil decide to contact Nightcrawler of the X-Men to consult him about Klum's potential nature as a mutant, since he possesses similar teleportation powers. Francis, elsewhere, explains his past to Felicia. Over the years, Francis was sexually abused by his older brother, who used him and his own talents to gain power. Garrison's main focus was to deliver drugs into his client, who paid heavily for no needle tracks. Francis had killed Garrison by teleporting inside his body and blowing him up out from the inside out to save Felicia. In attempting to persuade Francis to turn himself in, Felicia reveals she too had once been raped. Flashbacks reveal that Felicia was raped by her boyfriend, Ryan, as a freshman at Empire State University. She did not report the rape, not wanting to become "just another statistic" and trained in fighting techniques, intent on revenge on her attacker. Ryan died in a car accident before she could do anything, however. The story nearly convinces Francis, but Spider-Man and Daredevil show up at an inopportune moment, and a fight erupts. Francis falls from a great height but teleports away before hitting the water. Later, a disfigured Francis swears his revenge on Spider-Man as well as Black Cat, enlisting the aid of the Kingpin, who sells him the suit formerly worn by Mysterio.

== Collected editions ==
Title	ISBN	Release date	Issues
Spider-Man and the Black Cat: The Evil that Men Do	978-07851-1079-8	May 9, 2007	Spider-Man/Black Cat: The Evil that Men Do #1-6

== Reception ==
The series has received mixed reviews. ComicsAlliance named it among the worst comics of the decade, with Nick Nadel especially criticising the post-hiatus shift in tone, the reductive retconned origin of Black Cat, and the lack of coherence in the final issues, surmising that "if you ever need an example of just how far off the map superhero comics went in their forced attempts to go "dark" during this decade, look no further than "Spider-Man/Black Cat." Several pointed out the juxtaposition of Terry Dodson's art with the grim subject matter; Comic Book Resources criticised the overly-sexual cover for the first issue, while Ian Keogh of Slings & Arrows wondered if Smith was merely adding elements to later issues for shock value, and expressed discomfort that the story trivialised serious issues. Mark Ginocchio noted the series seemed to represent Smith's status as a one-trick pony. In a 2014 Vulture article expressing reservations about a planned Black Cat film, Abraham Josephine Riesman noted the character's "raison d’etre in the form of sexual violence is more than a little questionable when analyzed through a feminist lens".
