= Adrienne Frost =

- Adrienne Frost as the White Queen of the Hellfire Club

Publication information
- Publisher: Marvel Comics
- First appearance: Generation X #48 (February 1999)
- Created by: Jay Faerber (writer); Terry Dodson (artist)

In-story information
- Species: Human mutant
- Team affiliations: Generation X Hellfire Club
- Notable aliases: White Queen
- Abilities: Psychometry

Adrienne Frost is a supervillain appearing in American comic books published by Marvel Comics. Created by Jay Faerber and Terry Dodson, Adrienne Frost first appeared in Generation X #48 (February 1999). The character appeared in stories set in the Marvel Universe, commonly in association with the X-Men. She is the older sister of Emma Frost, Christian Frost, and Cordelia Frost.

== Publication history ==
Adrienne Frost made her debut in Generation X #48 (February 1999), and was created by writer Jay Faerber and artist Terry Dodson.

== Fictional character biography ==
=== Early years ===
Adrienne is the first-born child of Hazel and Winston Frost. Her siblings, Christian, Emma, and Cordelia, were born later. Adrienne established herself as the "perfect child" and was the favorite of their father, with her hoping to gain his favor and inherit the Frost family fortune.

Adrienne is a power monger and shows little remorse or emotion when hurting her siblings, both emotionally and physically. At an early age, Adrienne discovers her mutant ability of psychometry: the ability to touch an object and instantly know the object's history in terms of events surrounding its past, present, and future owners. Her power reveals to her what she had always known: Winston, her father, intended to pick the child whom he perceived as being able to guide his company into a state of growth and prosperity.

Adrienne becomes cold and distant from the world, seeing others as her pawns. Her powers allow her to become a top 'A' student, excel in all her endeavors, and continue to earn her father's favor. However, Emma's rebellion against Winston leads to Winston developing a profound new interest in her. To demoralize her, Adrienne outs Christian, to whom Emma is closest, causing Christian to attempt suicide.

Despite her plans, Adrienne has no control over the fact that her father saw Emma as akin to him when he was young. Confident, Adrienne and her siblings meet with Winston, who chooses Emma as his heir. Emma has grown sick of her father's manipulation and leaves to succeed on her own, leaving Adrienne as the second choice.

=== Headmistress of Generation X and revenge ===
Emma approaches Adrienne seeking to borrow money after her Massachusetts Academy falls into debt. Initially turning Emma down because of their history, Adrienne accepts her offer after learning that the academy is secretly the home of Generation X. She becomes co-headmistress of the Massachusetts Academy and convinces Emma to re-open the school to the public to raise the funds necessary to keep the school open. As a result of the new human student body, the members of Generation X are forced to hide their identities.

Using a combination of her powers and the Danger Room, Adrienne traps Generation X in a simulation recreating the deaths of the Hellions, Emma's original group of students, at the hands of Trevor Fitzroy. While Emma and Generation X escape this illusion, Adrienne, now calling herself the new White Queen, escapes.

Adrienne travels to London, where she embezzles millions of dollars from the Hellfire Club. She plots revenge on Emma by returning to the school, demanding that she be reinstated as headmistress, or she will expose the school as a mutant sanctuary. She reveals the school's mutant students regardless, starting riots among the human students and planting bombs at the school. The bombs are stopped by Synch, who dies containing the blast.

Emma later confronts Adrienne, who makes it clear that she intended to escalate the violence and endanger more students. Recognizing that her powers do not work on Adrienne, Emma shoots and kills her. Emma initially hides Adrienne's death from her students, going so far as to wipe the mind of an investigating policeman. Generation X's eventual discovery of Adrienne's murder causes them to no longer trust Emma.

== Powers and abilities ==
Adrienne had the mutant ability of psychometry. She was able to touch an object and instantly know a history of many events concerning the object, such as all of its previous owners, events that took place around the object, and the possible future of the object and its future owners. It allowed Adrienne to gather otherwise private information which she turned towards investigation, extortion, and espionage. Emma could not user her powers on Adrienne as the two were sisters, cancelling each other's powers.

Adrienne was also an exceptionally skilled and intelligent businesswoman and expert manipulator.
