= Silver and Black (disambiguation) =

Silver and Black is a nickname for the Las Vegas Raiders.

Silver and Black may also refer to:

- Silver & Black (album), by Luniz, 2002
- Silver & Black (unproduced film), an unproduced superhero film by Gina Prince-Bythewood
