= The Sensational Spider-Man (vol. 2) =

Comic book series from 2004 to 2007

Marvel Knights Spider-Man The Sensational Spider-Man (vol. 2)
- Cover art for Marvel Knights Spider-Man No. 1. Art by Terry and Rachel Dodson.

Publication information
- Publisher: Marvel Comics
- Schedule: Monthly
- Format: discontinued
- Publication date: Marvel Knights Spider-Man #1–22 (June 2004 – March 2006); The Sensational Spider-Man (vol. 2) #23–41 (April 2006 – November 2007)
- Main character(s): Spider-Man; Black Cat

Creative team
- Created by: Mark Millar; Terry Dodson
- Written by: Mark Millar; Reginald Hudlin; Roberto Aguirre-Sacasa
- Artist(s): Terry Dodson; Rachel Dodson; Angel Medina; Clayton Crain

The Sensational Spider-Man (vol. 2) is an American comic book series starring Spider-Man and published monthly by Marvel Comics for 41 issues between 2004 and 2007. It was originally published under the Marvel Knights imprint (as Marvel Knights Spider-Man, vol. 1, issues #1–22).

The underlying difference between this title and the other Spider-Man titles was that Marvel Knights Spider-Man was done with a more mature slant (in style if not content), thus the "Marvel Knights" prefix.

Intended to replace the canceled Spider-Man's Tangled Web series, Marvel Knights Spider-Man was originally supposed to be written by Kevin Smith, but due to scheduling problems he was replaced by Mark Millar. When Millar completed his year-long story arc, he was followed by writer Reginald Hudlin.

With the consolidation of the Marvel Knights line, Marvel Knights Spider-Man was renamed The Sensational Spider-Man as of issue 23. At this time, Roberto Aguirre-Sacasa took over writing duties on the book.

The Sensational Spider-Man was canceled after issue 41.

A second volume of Marvel Knights: Spider-Man, written by Matt Kindt, was published as a limited series in late 2013 and early 2014.

== Storylines ==
=== "Down Among the Dead Men" (issues 1–4) ===
- Writer: Mark Millar
- Penciler: Terry Dodson
- Inker: Rachel Dodson

When Spider-Man finally sends the Green Goblin to jail, an unknown enemy, knowing that Peter Parker is Spider-Man, kidnaps Aunt May. After an embarrassing trip to the Avengers, Spidey visits the Owl, who says that Electro and the Vulture kidnapped her. This turns out to be a ploy by the Owl, who is after the two villains for stealing from him. Spidey goes through a brutal fight with a newly powered up Electro and is hospitalized. He is photographed (with most of his mask torn away) and is ambushed by the Vulture, only to be saved by the Black Cat who leaves Vulture in a bad physical condition due to her foul mood at the time of their fight. The photos are brought to J. Jonah Jameson, who says he thinks the partial face looks familiar.

=== "Venomous" (issues 5–8) ===
- Writer: Mark Millar
- Penciler: Terry Dodson and Frank Cho
- Inker: Rachel Dodson

The pictures of the unmasked Spider-Man are published by the Daily Bugle, but Parker's face is too mangled to be identified. Jameson issues a $5 million reward for Spidey's alias. Meanwhile, Doctor Octopus goes on a rampage and Eddie Brock auctions off the Venom costume, which is bought by the Fortunato family for the baby of the family, Angelo. Spidey visits the X-Men, where Rachel Summers tells him she thinks Aunt May is dead. Parker goes to his high school reunion and is attacked by Venom. During a grueling battle, the suit abandons Angelo, who falls to his death. Eddie Brock is discovered to have slit his own wrists. May's kidnapper then calls Parker and asks him to lunch.

=== "The Last Stand" (issues 9–12) ===
- Writer: Mark Millar
- Penciler: Terry Dodson
- Inker: Rachel Dodson

The kidnapper turns out to be the Scorpion, who is working for Norman Osborn. They blackmail Spidey to break Norman out of jail for his Aunt's safety, and after apologising to his Uncle Ben at his grave, he goes through with it. During the breakout, Spidey (along with the Black Cat) is attacked by the new Sinister 12, which includes the Scorpion as the new Venom. The 12, with the exclusion of the Goblin and Venom, battle the two heroes until many of the Marvel heroes come to save the day. Spidey chases after the Goblin, but is ambushed by Venom, whom he defeats. Spidey finds the Goblin on the Brooklyn Bridge with his wife, Mary Jane Watson. The two battle, but are interrupted by Doctor Octopus, who has been brainwashed to kill the Goblin by a shadowy organization. Spidey defeats them both, saves MJ, and rescues his Aunt, who is buried alive and unharmed in the grave of his Uncle Ben.

=== "Wild Blue Yonder" (issues 13–18) ===
- Writer: Reginald Hudlin
- Penciler: Billy Tan
- Inker: Jonathan Sibal

After all the trauma of finding Aunt May and once again defeating the Green Goblin, Spider-Man is now a full member of the Avengers, living in Stark Tower with May and Mary Jane Watson. His summer-school job falls through, so he looks to the Daily Bugle for work. The Owl has placed a bounty on Spider-Man and the Absorbing Man and his unnamed female consultant are looking to collect. After a fight the unnamed woman stole Peter's wallet and starts looking for him at May and Peter's houses which are destroyed, so they leave none-the-wiser.

At the Daily Bugle, Peter meets the new star reporter from Iowa, named Ethan Edwards. Ethan possesses a variety of superpowers, such as flight, super human strength, ability to see in every light spectrum, energy projection and even healing powers. Ethan's fundamentalist parents raised him to believe that "with power there must also come great responsibility" in life. Ethan asks Peter to train him and Peter agrees, so he takes him with the Fantastic Four to run some tests, which later on lead him to discover what he really is.

Meanwhile, the Absorbing Man was critically wounded by the Punisher shortly after escaping from a robbery, and turns into steel to avoid bleeding to death. He absorbs the properties of cocaine (actually an unnamed drug, but the reference is clear enough) so the slug can be removed. The Owl's men use a high-powered electric fan to blow the Absorbing Man apart after he had turned into cocaine.

The cocaine remains of the Absorbing Man are sold on the streets, and the users temporarily gain the powers of the Absorbing Man.

=== "The Other" (issues 19–22) ===
- Writer: Peter David, Reginald Hudlin, J. Michael Straczynski
- Penciler: Pat Lee
- Inker: Dream Engine

These issues are part of the twelve-part crossover, Spider-Man: The Other, one-third of which is told in Marvel Knights: Spider-Man (the other two-thirds told in Friendly Neighborhood Spider-Man and The Amazing Spider-Man).

The second chapter of The Other, "Denial", focuses on Mary Jane, who overhears that Spider-Man might be getting killed on television. She rushes to a bar to see the live coverage on TV, and she sees Spider-Man fighting Tracer, who is controlling Iron Man's armor and forcing him to attack Spider-Man. Later, at home, Mary Jane confronts Peter, telling him she thinks he has a death wish, but Peter interrupts her to tell her the news from the doctor.

The fifth chapter of The Other, "Retreat", Peter, Mary Jane and Aunt May go to Latveria to use Doctor Doom's time machine to see past scenes in his life, like the day Richard and Mary Parker left Peter in the care of his Uncle Ben and May. After returning to Stark Tower, Peter briefly considers a trip to Las Vegas with Mary Jane, namely in Tony Stark's penthouse suite. He ultimately rejects the idea, assuming even if he managed to win big at the blackjack tables, some super-villain or other would end up disrupting the whole vacation. Later, Morlun searches for Spider-Man, in vain, as Peter and Mary–Jane are in one of Stark's space pods, looking down upon the Earth.

=== "Feral" (Issues 23–27) ===
- Writer: Roberto Aguirre-Sacasa
- Penciller: Angel Medina, Clayton Crain
- Inker: Scott Hanna

Curt Connors takes a look at "The Rock of Life" which causes a mysterious disease and causes many characters to become very angry, including Man-Wolf, Vermin, Connors as the Lizard, Black Cat, Puma and others. Black Cat has the hardest time controlling her anger, almost killing Lizard in a fury. Mary Jane also finds herself with a knife in a fit of rage. It is soon discovered that the rock was brought to New York by the villain Stegron with the aim of regressing all of humanity. Spider-Man, who has been able to show the most resistance to the rock, stops him.

=== "My Science Teacher is Spider-Man!!" (Issue 28) ===
- Writer: Roberto Aguirre-Sacasa
- Penciller: Clayton Crain
- Inker: Scott Hanna

Due to the events in Civil War No. 2, Spider-Man has unmasked to the world. Jordan Harrison, one of Peter's students, is shocked to learn this. When Doctor Octopus discovers that Spider-Man was only fifteen when he first defeated him, he goes on a rampage through New York. Jordan Harrison distracts Doctor Octopus so Spidey can knock him out.

This story was included in the second compilation of Civil War involving Spider-Man, entitled "Peter Parker, Spider-Man".

=== "The Deadly Foes of Peter Parker"(Issue 29–31) ===
- Writer: Roberto Aguirre-Sacasa
- Penciller: Angel Medina
- Inker: Scott Hanna

Now that the world knows Spidey's identity, Chameleon arranges his deadliest foes to go after his loved ones. Black Cat is angry that Spider-Man has gone public, but she teams up with him to stop his foes all the same.

=== "The Husband or the Spider?," "Wounds," and "Nothing Can Stop the Rhino" (Issues 32–34) ===
- Writer: Roberto Aguirre-Sacasa
- Penciller: Sean Chen

These three issues deal with how the women in Spider-Man's life are affected by his unmasking. The issues deal with Mary Jane Watson, Aunt May, and the Black Cat respectively. The storyline focuses on each of the women reacting to not only Peter's public unmasking, but also a brutal beating that Peter receives at the hands of the Rhino.

=== "The Strange Case Of..." (Issues 35–37) ===
- Writer: Roberto Aguirre-Sacasa
- Penciller: Angel Medina (#35), Ramon Bachs (#36-#37)

Spider-Man copycats start turning up in Manhattan, with some of them having the same powers as Peter. After Spider-Man finds one of them and sees that something is seriously wrong, he takes him to see Mr. Fantastic while Curt Connors investigates the strange fluids on a blanket the doppelganger had been in contact with.

=== "The Last Temptation of Eddie Brock" (Issues 38–39) ===
- Writer: Roberto Aguirre-Sacasa
- Penciller: Lee Weeks

Eddie Brock, wasting away from cancer, finds that Peter's Aunt May is in the very same hospital, and he hatches one final plan to take his revenge against Spider-Man.

=== "The Book of Peter" (Issue 40) ===
- Writer: Roberto Aguirre-Sacasa
- Penciller: Clayton Crain
- ISSN 1932-8923

Peter's guilt deepens as he fears that his Aunt May will die from injuries sustained during an attack that was targeted at him. Peter reflects on the amount of death and tragedy he has encountered (Uncle Ben, Gwen Stacy, etc.) due to his leading a double-life as Spider-Man. As despair consumes him, he is visited by a mysterious stranger (God) who conveys to him that in life tragedy affects everyone in some form or another. Also, he explains that due to Spider-Man's heroic efforts, many people are alive and well, and that should bring him some comfort. While alleviating some of Peter's guilt, the information doesn't change the helplessness that Peter feels towards his situation. The story concludes with the stranger telling Peter to have faith, and that he has asked a lot more from people much closer to him, a possible reference to Jesus Christ. The last page is Peter living as an old man with his wife, giving Spider-Man a happy ending.

=== "One More Day" Part 3 of 4 (Issue 41) ===
- Writer: J. Michael Straczynski
- Penciller: Joe Quesada

See "One More Day" article for synopsis.

NOTE: Issue #41 marked the final The Sensational Spider-Man (vol. 2) issue. At the conclusion of the "One More Day" storyline, this book and Friendly Neighborhood Spider-Man were merged into The Amazing Spider-Man which began publication three times a month starting in 2008.

== Collections ==
#	Title	Material collected	Released	Format	Pages	ISBN
Trade Paperbacks
1	Down Among The Dead Men	Marvel Knights Spider-Man #1-4	13 Oct 2004	TPB	96	978-0785114376
2	Venomous	Marvel Knights Spider-Man #5-8	2 Feb 2005	TPB	96	978-0785116752
3	The Last Stand	Marvel Knights Spider-Man #9-12	25 May 2005	TPB	96	978-0785116769
	Spider-Man by Mark Millar Ultimate Collection	Marvel Knights Spider-Man #1-12	28 Dec 2011	TPB	284	978-0785156406
4	Wild Blue Yonder	Marvel Knights Spider-Man #13-18	23 Nov 2005	TPB	144	978-0785117612
	Spider-Man: The Other	Amazing Spider-Man #525-528; Friendly Neighborhood Spider-Man #1-4; Marvel Knights Spider-Man #19-22	25 Oct 2006	HC	288	978-0785121886
	Spider-Man: The Other	Amazing Spider-Man #525-528; Friendly Neighborhood Spider-Man #1-4; Marvel Knights Spider-Man #19-22	4 Apr 2007	Red costume TPB	288	978-0785117650
	Spider-Man: The Other	Amazing Spider-Man #525-528; Friendly Neighborhood Spider-Man #1-4; Marvel Knights Spider-Man #19-22	4 Apr 2007	Black costume TPB	288	978-0785128120
	Sensational Spider-Man: Feral	Sensational Spider-Man (vol. 2) #23-27	1 Nov 2006	HC	128	978-0785123187
	Sensational Spider-Man: Feral	Sensational Spider-Man (vol. 2) #23-27	25 Apr 2007	TPB	128	978-0785121268
	Civil War: Peter Parker, Spider-Man	Sensational Spider-Man (vol. 2) #28-34	23 May 2007	TPB	168	978-0785121893
	Peter Parker, Spider-Man: Back in Black	Sensational Spider-Man (vol. 2) #35-40, Annual #1; Spider-Man Family #1-2; Marvel Spotlight: Spider-Man; Spider-Man: Back in Black Handbook	28 Nov 2007	HC	336	978-0785129202
	Peter Parker, Spider-Man: Back in Black	Sensational Spider-Man (vol. 2) #35-40, Annual #1; Spider-Man Family #1-2; Marvel Spotlight: Spider-Man; Spider-Man: Back in Black Handbook	19 Mar 2008	TPB	336	978-0785129974
	Spider-Man: One More Day	Amazing Spider-Man #544-545; Sensational Spider-Man #41; Friendly Neighborhood Spider-Man #24	9 Apr 2008	HC	136	978-0785126331
	Spider-Man: One More Day	Amazing Spider-Man #544-545; Sensational Spider-Man #41; Friendly Neighborhood Spider-Man #24	27 Aug 2008	TPB	136	978-0785126348
Oversized Hardcovers
	Marvel Knights Spider-Man	Marvel Knights Spider-Man #1-12	16 Nov 2005	OHC	304	978-0785118428

== See also ==
- List of Spider-Man titles
