= Infinite Destinies =

2021 Marvel Comics event

- Publisher: Marvel Comics
- Publication date: June – August 2021
- Genre: Superhero
- Main character(s): Spider-Man; Avengers; Black Cat; Fantastic Four; Guardians of the Galaxy; Miles Morales

Creative team
- Writer: Jed MacKay
- Penciller: Marco Castiello
- Inker: Ibraim Roberson
- Letterer: Clayton Cowles
- Colorist: Ruth Redmond
- Editor: C. B. Cebulski

"Infinite Destinies" is a 2021 storyline published by Marvel Comics. It deals with Spider-Man, the Avengers, Black Cat, and Miles Morales dealing with individuals who have acquired the Infinity Stones. The crossover event received mixed reviews from critics who criticized the inconsistent art and underwhelming endings.

== Publication history ==
On March 18, 2020 Marvel Comics that it would be releasing Infinite Destinies, a story where the heroes meet new heroes and villains who acquire the Infinity Stones that will shake up the Marvel Universe. However, due to the COVID-19 pandemic, the event was delayed for a full year.

== Plot ==
Iron Man arrives in Brooklyn where he sees Miles Morales fighting against a clone army of Mole Man. Iron Man helps de-escalate the situation and learns that a villain named Assessor tortured Miles. Iron Man goes to confront the Assessor where he overcomes trials until he meets a villain named Quantum. Quantum and Iron Man fight until Quantum escapes, revealing he has the Space Stone lodged in his chest.

During the events of Infinity Wars, a man named Hector Bautista, who was wrongfully accused of murder, acquired the Time Stone, which allowed him to freeze and restart time. Hector then calls himself Overtime and is hiding in Texas. Captain America and Black Widow confront Overtime, but he manages to escape while causing collateral damage. Captain America then meets with Nick Fury Jr. to talk about the recent events.

Black Cat meets up with a Korean heroine named White Fox and her team of superheroes called the Tiger Division to take down a group of criminals led by a man named Mongul. Nick Fury Jr. is investigating the mystery between the Infinity Stones being stuck to different people when he is attacked by a mysterious figure.

Spider-Man meets a person named Star who has access to the Reality Stone. Spider-Man tries to give her a pep talk, but she escapes. The mysterious figure injects Nick Fury Jr to bring his world back. Thor is having a party in Asgard with Hawkeye when he is suddenly captured by an enemy named Valg, who wants to destroy the universe. Hawkeye frees Thor and Valg disappears. Meanwhile, the mysterious figure reveals to Nick Fury Jr. that he is Nighthawk of the Squadron Supreme of America. Hercules is out drinking in a bar where he meets an individual who swallowed the Power Stone and they deal with enemies, with Hercules being angry that the individual kept on talking about his backstory.

Miles Morales meets a superhero named Amulet where they defeat a Cyclops by destroying an artefact and destroy a villain's pet, which causes the villain to commit suicide. Meanwhile, Nighthawk kidnaps Star and wants her to change reality to bring his world back, but Nick Fury Jr. pulls a gun on Nighthawk. Iron Man and Captain America deal with a robot who managed to be possessed by the Soul Stone, but the individual soon leaves to take care of his injured friend. Fury breaks out of his mind control thanks to his training in S.H.I.E.L.D. and Nighthawk escapes.

== Issues involved ==
=== Main issues ===
- Iron Man Vol. 6 Annual #1
- Captain America Vol. 9 2021 Annual #1
- Black Cat Annual Vol. 2 Annual #1
- Amazing Spider-Man Vol. 5 Annual # 2
- Thor Vol. 6 Annual #1
- Miles Morales: Spider-Man Annual #1
- Guardians of the Galaxy Annual Vol. 4 #1
- Avengers Annual Vol. 8 #1

=== Tie-in issues ===
- Black Cat Vol. 2 #8-10

== Critical reception ==
According to Comic Book Roundup, Iron Man Volume 6 Annual #1 received a score of 7.7 out of10 based on 5 reviews. Charles Hartford from But Why Tho wrote: "When all is said and done, Iron Man Annual #1 delivers a multifaceted story that serves a lot more than I expected. It does a good job as a starting point for something bigger, while also providing a fulfilling narrative of its own."

According to Comic Book Roundup, Captain America Volume 3 Annual #1 (2021) received a score of 6.9 out of 10 based on 7 reviews. Lia Galanis from AIPT wrote: "Widow and Cap have fun banter, but the book feels less like a Cap book overall and more like an Avengers story. And quite frankly, an Avengers story that should have been told earlier considering the event in question happened in 2018. To go this route with the Annual is a bit odd, but Steve has some standout moments in the title."

According to Comic Book Roundup, Black Cat Annual #1 received a score of 7.4 out of 10 based on 5 reviews. Russ Bickerstaff from You Don't Read Comics wrote "The continuation of the cross-annual “Infinite Destinies” event continues to lumber its way through the summer in the third instalment of a story that doesn’t really have anything to do with Black Cat."

According to Comic Book Roundup, Amazing Spider Man Annual #2 received a score of 6.4 out of 10 based on 4 reviews. Jimmy Hayes from Comic Watch wrote: "Not the best book I've ever read. Give any number of high-quality indie books a look instead!"

According to Comic Book Roundup, Avengers Annual #1 received a score of 6 out of 10 based on 2 reviews. M.R. Jafri from Comic Crusaders wrote "There is always a place for humor and parody in comics, but this book is so poorly done that it feels like a waste of everyone's time and threatens to derail the entire crossover."

== Collected editions ==
Title	Material collected	Published date	ISBN
Infinite Destinies	Iron Man Annual #1, Captain America Annual #1, Thor Annual #1, Black Cat Annual #1, Avengers Annual #1, Miles Morales: Spider-Man Annual #1, Guardians of the Galaxy Annual #1, Amazing Spider-Man Annual #2	November 2021	978-1302931506
Black Cat Vol. 6: Infinity Score	Black Cat (vol. 2) #8-10, Giant-Size Black Cat: Infinity Score #1	January 2022	978-1302931384
