= Generation X (comic book) =

1994–2018 Marvel comic series

Publication information
- Publisher: Marvel Comics
- Format: Ongoing series
- Genre: Superhero
- Publication date: (vol. 1); Nov. 1994–Feb. 2018 (vol. 2); Jul. 2017–Jan. 2018
- No. of issues: (vol. 1): 80 (vol. 2): 9
- Main character: Generation X

Generation X is the name of several comic book titles featuring the team Generation X and published by Marvel Comics, beginning with the original Generation X comic book series which debuted in 1994.

Generation X debuted during the 1994 "Phalanx Covenant" storyline, and appeared in their own monthly series in September 1994 with Generation X #1 (November 1994).

Generation X consisted of teenage mutants designed to reflect the cynicism and complexity of the series' namesake demographic.

The book's original creators left it in 1997. The series was cancelled with issue #75 in 2001. Sixteen years after the original series had ended, a second volume debuted in 2017 as part of ResurrXion, with Jubilee mentoring a group of students in the rechristened Xavier Institute.

== Publication history ==
Many members of Generation X debuted during the "Phalanx Covenant" storyline, a crossover spanning across every X-Men-related comic book in the summer of 1994. The Phalanx, an extraterrestrial collective intelligence, attempted to absorb many of Earth's mutants into its matrix and captured several of the young mutants who would make up Generation X as "practice" before moving on to the X-Men.

In September of that year, Generation X #1 was published, establishing the team at Emma Frost's Massachusetts Academy. It also introduced their nemesis Emplate, a vampire-like mutant who sucked the bone marrow of young mutants. As the series continued, fans and critics praised Bachalo's quirky, complex artwork and Lobdell's realistic teenage characters. The series soon became one of the most popular X-Men books.

Lobdell and Bachalo departed in 1997, leaving writer Larry Hama and artist Terry Dodson to reveal the long-standing mysteries behind M, Penance, and Emplate. Hama revealed that M was in fact an amalgamation of Monet St. Croix's two younger sisters, who could merge as part of their mutant powers; Emplate was their brother who, after experimenting with black magic, was caught in a strange limbo and needed mutant bone marrow to escape; and Penance was the actual Monet St. Croix, transformed by one of Emplate's spells. This information was revealed in Generation X #35–40 (1997–1998) and greeted with disapproval by most fans. Lobdell's original plan had involved the twins, but did not include a "real" Monet.

The saga ended with the actual Monet St. Croix taking on the role of M, but fans' reactions did not get much better and sales began to dip. Hama's successor, Jay Faerber, attempted to revive the title, bringing in a regular human student population at the school and making Emma's sister Adrienne Frost another headmistress in Generation X #50 (1999).

In 2000, writer Warren Ellis, known for his dark, sarcastic style, was hired to revamp Generation X, as part of the Counter-X rebranding of several second-tier X-titles (the others being X-Force and X-Man). Ellis acted as 'plotmaster', while Brian Wood handled the actual scripting chores and later acted as sole writer of the series. Fan response was positive, largely because Ellis and Wood dealt with the teenaged cast without resorting to cliché. However, in early 2001, Marvel editor-in-chief Joe Quesada cancelled Generation X, in addition to five other X-Books, arguing that so many mutant superhero books had become redundant. Also, X-Men writer Grant Morrison wanted to add a new cast of teenage mutants to the Xavier Institute in New York. In Generation X #75, the team disbanded and the Massachusetts Academy closed.

== Contributors ==
=== Writers ===
- Scott Lobdell: Generation X #1-28
- Larry Hama: Generation X #33-44, #46-47, & 1/2
- Jay Faerber: Generation X #45, #48-62, & Annual '99
- Brian Wood: Generation X #63-75

=== Artists ===
- Chris Bachalo: Generation X #1-6, #17-22, #25, #27-31, & -1
- Terry Dodson: Generation X #38-40, #42-45, #48-50, #52-57, & #59-60
- Steve Pugh: Generation X #63-68, #70-72, #74

== Publications ==
=== List of titles ===
- Generation X Collector's Preview (October 1994, Marvel Comics)
- Generation X #−1 & 1–75 (July 1997 & November 1994 – June 2001, Marvel Comics)
- Generation X Annual 1995–1997, 1999 (September 1995 – November 1999, Marvel Comics)
- Generation X/Dracula Annual 1998 (October 1998, Marvel Comics)
- Generation X 1/2 (July 1998, Marvel Comics & Wizard Magazine)
- Generation X San Diego Comic Con 1/2 (July 1994, Marvel Comics, Overstreet)
- Generation X Holiday Special (February 1998, Marvel Comics)
- Generation X Underground Special (May 1998, Marvel Comics)

== Collected editions ==
=== First Series ===
Title	Material collected	Publication date	ISBN
The Origin of Generation X	Generation X #1; Cable #16; Excalibur #82; The Uncanny X-Men #316- 317; Wolverine #85; X-Factor #106; X-Force #38; X-Men #36–37	June 2001	978-0785102168
Generation X Classic: Vol. #1	Generation X #1–4; The Uncanny X-Men #316- 318; X-Men #36–37	December 2010	978-0785149675
Generation X Classic: Vol. #2	Generation X #5–11; Generation X Annual '95; Generation X San Diego Preview	January 2013	978-0785166863
Generation X Epic Collection: Back To School	Uncanny X-Men (1981) 316–318, X-Men (1991) 36–37, Generation X (1994) 1–9, Wolverine (1988) 94, Generation X Collectors' Preview (1994) 1, Generation X Ashcan Edition (1994) 1	August 2021	978-1302930769
Generation X Epic Collection: Emplate's Revenge	Generation X (1994) 10–23, Generation X Annual '95-'96, Generation X San Diego Preview (1994) 1, material from Incredible Hulk Annual '97	May 2022	978-1302946494
Generation X Epic Collection: The Secret of M	Generation X (1994) 23–32, Generation X Annual '97, Generation X Underground (1994) 1, X-Men Unlimited #16, Spider-Man Team-Up #1, Daydreamers #1-3	June 2023	
Generation X Epic Collection: Pride and Penance	Generation X 33–47, 1/2, Generation X/Dracula Annual '98; X-Men Unlimited #20; Generation X Christmas Special	June 2024	
X-Men: Operation Zero Tolerance	Generation X #26–31, X-Force vol. 1 #67–70, X-Men #65–70, Uncanny X-Men #346, Wolverine #115–118, Cable #45–47, X-Man #30	August 2012	0785162402
Counter-X Vol. 2	Generation X #63–70	September 2008	978-0785133056
Counter-X: Generation X – Four Days	Generation X #71–75	February 2013	978-0785167303

=== Second Series ===
Title	Material collected	Publication date	ISBN
Generation X, Volume 1: Natural Selection	Generation X #1–6	November 14, 2017	Paperback: 978-1302907365
Generation X, Volume 2: Survival of the Fittest	Generation X #6–9, #85–87	April 3, 2018	Paperback: 978-1302907372
