= Rachel Dodson =

American comic book inker and colorist

- Area: Inker
- Notable works: Wonder Woman; Spider-Man; Spider-Man/Black Cat: The Evil that Men Do; Harley Quinn

Rachel Dodson is an American comic book inker, who often works with her husband, Terry Dodson. Her work includes Marvel Knights: Spider-Man, Spider-Man/Black Cat: The Evil that Men Do and Avenging Spider-Man for Marvel Comics and Wonder Woman and Harley Quinn for DC Comics.

== Bibliography ==
Dodson has been inking comics since 1994.

=== Variant covers ===
- Action Comics #17
- Poison Ivy: Cycle of Life and Death #1
- He-Man and The Masters of The Universe #1
- Superwoman #1 - 3
- Wonder Woman #38, 44, 46
- The Amazing Spider-Man (Vol. 6) #14, 19-20

=== Covers ===
- Catwoman #21 - 22, 24 - 26, 28 - 34
- Catwoman: Vol. 5: Race of Thieves
- Catwoman: Future's End #1
- Coloring DC: Harley Quinn and the Suicide Squad Vol. 1
- DC Comics Bombshells Annual #1
- Harley Quinn: Night and Day
- Harley Quinn: Welcome to Metropolis
- Teen Titans: Earth One

=== Artist ===
- Harley Quinn: Night and Day
- Harley Quinn: Welcome to Metropolis
- Teen Titans: Earth One
- The Art of DC Comics Bombshells

=== Inker ===
- Teen Titans: Earth One

== Marvel Comics ==
=== Inker ===
- Avengers (2010) #33
- Defenders (2011) #5
- Point One (2011) #1
- The Uncanny X-Men (1963) #504 - 507, 511, 513, 518–520, 529
- Dark Avengers/Uncanny X-Men: Exodus (2009) #1
- Secret Invasion: X-Men (2008) #1-4
- Young X-Men (2008) #3-7
- Spider-Man/Black Cat: The Evil That Men Do (2002) #1-6
- Marvel Knights Spider-Man (2004) #2-4, 6–7, 9-12
- The Amazing Spider-Man (Vol. 6) #14, 19-20
- Wolverine (1988) #186
- Wolverine Legends Vol. 3: Law of the Jungle tpb
- Daredevil (1998) #40
- Deadpool (1997) #-1

=== Artist ===
- Avengers (2010) #34
- Defenders (2011) #1 - 3
