= Terry Dodson =

American comic artist

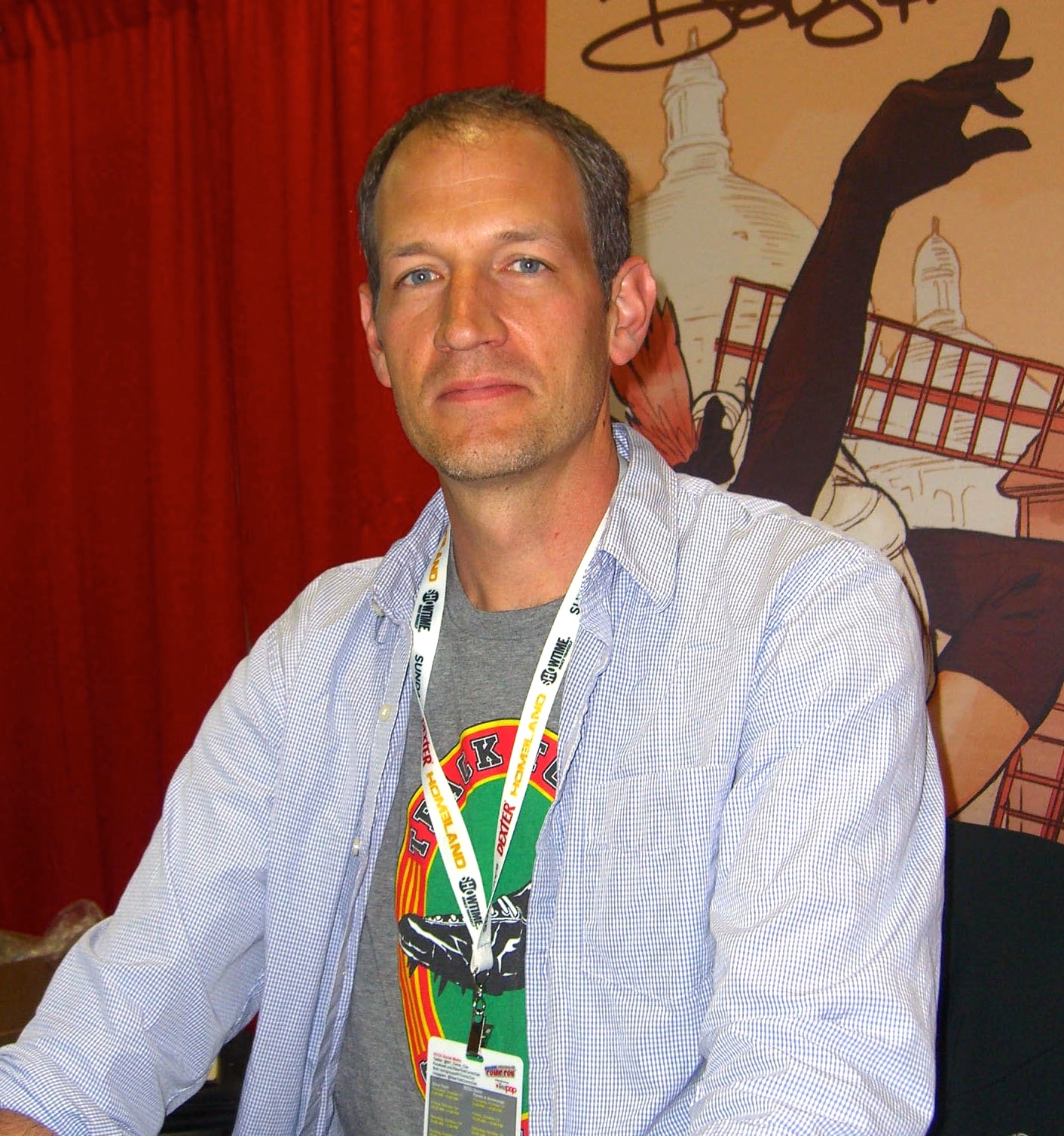
- Dodson at the 2012 New York Comic Con
- Area: Artist
- Notable works: Harley Quinn; Spider-Man/Black Cat: The Evil that Men Do; Marvel Knights: Spider-Man; Uncanny X-Men; Wonder Woman (vol. 3)

Terry Dodson is an American comic book artist and penciller. He is best known for his work on titles such as Harley Quinn, Trouble, Spider-Man/Black Cat: The Evil that Men Do, Marvel Knights: Spider-Man, Wonder Woman and Uncanny X-Men. His pencils are usually inked by his wife Rachel Dodson, who is a comic book inker and colorist.

== Career ==
Dodson began his illustration career in 1991 at Revolutionary Comics, drawing issues of Rock 'N' Roll Comics that featured illustrated bios of performers like Rod Stewart (#38) and others. He first came to mainstream prominence as the artist on Malibu Comics' Ultraverse title Mantra in 1993. He co-created the character with writer Mike W. Barr.

In early 1996, he drew a four issue Storm mini series (starring the X-Men character of the same name), which was written by Warren Ellis, inked by Karl Story and published by Marvel Comics.

Harley Quinn #1 cover by Terry and Rachel Dodson

Later that same year this creative team reunited for another X-Men-related limited series — the three-issue Pryde and Wisdom title, starring Kitty Pryde and Pete Wisdom.

In 1998, he became the regular penciller of Marvel's Generation X, where he remained until 2000 (#38-60).

In 2000, Dodson left Marvel for DC Comics where he pencilled a Harley Quinn ongoing series written by Karl Kesel. He left the title a year later.

Dodson returned to Marvel in 2002 to draw Spider-Man and the Black Cat: The Evil that Men Do, a limited series which was not completed until 2006 due to delays.

In 2003, Dodson and writer Mark Millar produced a controversial limited series titled Trouble, which was published through Marvel's Epic Comics imprint. The series which was supposedly aimed at a teenage girl audience, featured suggestive photo covers of girls in bikinis and seemed to reveal details about Peter Parker (Spider-Man)'s true parentage.

In 2004, Dodson and Millar reteamed to launch a new ongoing Spider-Man series, Marvel Knights Spider-Man. They left after a 12-issue arc.

Dodson provided covers and interior art for DC Comics' 2006 relaunch of Wonder Woman. He has also completed the first volume of Songes: Coraline, a comic strip which is edited and published in France and Spain.

Dodson and artist Greg Land alternated story arcs on Marvel's Uncanny X-Men, with drawing issues #504 to #538.

In 2014, General Mills enlisted the help of DC Comics to create new designs for its monster-themed cereals in time for Halloween. The designs, revealed on August 6, consisted of a Count Chocula design by Dodson, a Boo Berry design by Jim Lee, and a Franken-Berry design by Dave Johnson.

Other projects in the 2010s include pencilling issues of Defenders, X-Men, Avengers & X-Men AXIS and Star Wars: Princess Leia for Marvel Comics and Red One for Image Comics.

== Bibliography ==
=== Interior art ===
==== DC ====
- Legends of the DC Universe #10-11: "Folie a Deux" (with Kelley Puckett, 1998)
- Gen^{13} #66: "Meanwhile..." (with Adam Warren and various artists, Wildstorm, 2001)
- Harley Quinn #1-7, 10–12, 14-19 (with Karl Kesel, Craig Rousseau and Phil Noto, 2000–2002)
- Silver Age: "Pawns of the Invincible Immortal!" (with Mark Waid, one-shot, 2000)
- Showcase '96 #8: "Limited Resources" (with Peter David, 1996)
- Adventures of Superman #540: "Curtain Call" (with Karl Kesel and Jerry Ordway, 1996)
- Team Titans #17-20, 22-23 (with Jeff Jensen and Phil Jimenez, 1994)
- The Titans #25: "This is Your Life" (with Jay Faerber, Marv Wolfman and various artists, 2001)
- WildC.A.T.s: Covert Action Teams #18-19: "Savant" (with James Robinson, Wildstorm, 1995)
- Wonder Woman, vol. 3, #1-4, Annual #1, 8–9, 14-17 (with Allan Heinberg, Jodi Picoult and Gail Simone, 2006–08)
- Teen Titans: Earth One Volume 1 (with Jeff Lemire, 2014)

==== Marvel ====
- Age of Apocalypse (Marvel, 1995):
  - Factor X #3-4 (with John Francis Moore and Steve Epting, 1995)
  - X-Universe #2 (with Scott Lobdell, Terry Kavanagh and Carlos Pacheco, 1995)
  - X-Men Chronicles (with Howard Mackie, one-shot, 1995)
  - X-Men Prime (with Scott Lobdell and Fabian Nicieza and various artists, one-shot, 1995)
- Daredevil, vol. 2, #40: "Trial of the Century: Part Three" (with Brian Michael Bendis, Marvel, 2002)
- The Defenders, vol. 3, #1-3, 7 (with Matt Fraction, 2011–12)
- Excalibur #83: "Bend Sinister" (with Warren Ellis and Bill Sienkiewicz, 1994)
- Generation X #38-40, 42–45, 48–50, 52–57, 59-60 (with Larry Hama, Jay Faerber, Dan Lawlis, Derec Aucoin, Karl Kerschl and Chris Renaud, 1998–2000)
- Uncanny X-Men (Marvel, 1998–2011):
  - "In Sin Air" (with Steven T. Seagle and various artists, in #352, 1998)
  - "SFX, Part One" (with Ed Brubaker, Matt Fraction and Greg Land, in #500, 2008)
  - "Lovelorn" (with Matt Fraction, in #504-507, 2009)
  - "Sisterhood, Part Four" (with Matt Fraction and Greg Land, in #511, 2009)
  - "Dark Avengers/Uncanny X-Men: Utopia, Parts Two & Four" (with Matt Fraction, in #513-514, 2009)
  - Dark Avengers/Uncanny X-Men: Exodus (with Matt Fraction and Mike Deodato, Jr., one-shot, 2009)
  - "Nation X, Parts Four & Five" (with Matt Fraction, in #518-519, 2010)
  - "Second Coming, Parts Two, Six & Ten" (with Matt Fraction, in #523-525, 2010)
  - "Breaking Point" (with Kieron Gillen, in #535-538, 2011)
- The Incredible Hulk, vol. 1, #433: "Over the Edge" (with Peter David, 1995)
- Princess Leia, vol. 1, #1-5 (with Mark Waid, 2015)
- Pryde and Wisdom #1-3 (with Warren Ellis and Karl Story, 1996)
- Marvel Knights: Spider-Man #1-4, 6–7, 9-12 (with Mark Millar, Marvel, 2004–2005)
- Spider-Man and the Black Cat: "The Evil that Men Do" #1-6 (with Kevin Smith, 2002–2006)
- The Amazing Spider-Man (Vol. 6) #14 (with Zeb Wells, 2022), 19-20 (with Joe Kelly, 2023), 50 (with Marv Wolfman, 2024)
- Storm #1-4: "Nocturnes" (with Warren Ellis, Marvel, 1996)
- Trouble #1-5 (with Mark Millar, Marvel, 2003–2004)
- X-Men (Marvel, 1994–1995):
  - "Birds of a Feather" (with Fabian Nicieza, in #39, 1994)
  - "A Sinister Heart" (with J.M. DeMatteis, Ralph Macchio and John Paul Leon, in Annual '95, 1995)
- X-Force (Marvel, 1995):
  - "A Lie of the Mind" (with Fabian Nicieza, in #42, 1995)
  - "Target: X-Force" (with Jeph Loeb, in #49, 1995)
- Wolverine, vol. 1, #186: "See Ya Around, Frankie" (with Frank Tieri, 2003)
- X-Man (1996–97):
  - "Mind Games" (with Ralph Macchio, in Annual '96, 1996)
  - All Saints' Day (with Ben Raab, graphic novel, 1997)

==== Other publishers ====
- Rock 'n' Roll Comics #38: "Rod Stewart" (with Jay Allen Sanford, Revolutionary, 1991)
- Mantra #1-3, 5–7, 12, 21 (with Mike W. Barr, Malibu, 1993–1994)
- Will to Power #7-9: "Main Story" (with Barbara Kesel, Dark Horse, 1994)
- Ghost #5: "Trophy Ghost" (with Eric Luke and Lee Moder, Dark Horse, 1995)
- Star Wars: Dark Force Rising #1-6 (with Mike Baron and Timothy Zahn, Dark Horse, 1997)
- Judgment Day Omega: "The Trial" (with Alan Moore and various artists, Awesome, 1997)
- Witchblade #92 (with Ron Marz and various artists, Top Cow, 2005)
- Songes (with Denis-Pierre Filippi, graphic novel, Les Humanoïdes Associés, 2006–2012)
  - Coraline (#1, 2006)
  - Célia (#2, 2012)
  - Songes, sketchbook (2007)
  - Songes, complete edition (2013)
- Red Skin (with Xavier Dorison, Glénat, 2014)
  - Welcome to America #1, 2014
  - Jacky #2, 2016
- Red One #1-4 (with Xavier Dorison, English version of Red Skin, Image, 2015–2016)

=== Covers ===
- Mantra #4, 9 (with Mike W. Barr, Malibu, 1993–1994)
- Team Titans #21, 24 (DC Comics, 1994)
- Excalibur #92 (Marvel, 1995)
- C.H.I.X. #1 (Image, 1998)
- Generation X #37, 41, 46–47, 51, 58, 61–62, Annual '99 (Marvel, 1998–2000)
- C.H.I.X.: That Time Forgot #1 (Image, 1998)
- X-Man #50 (Marvel, 1999)
- Adventures of Superman #578 (DC Comics, 2000)
- Xena: Warrior Princess #10, 12, 14 (Dark Horse, 2000)
- Gen-Active #2 (Wildstorm, 2000)
- Harley Quinn #8-9, 20-23 (DC Comics, 2001–2002)
- Hopeless Savages: Ground Zero #1-4 (Oni Press, 2002)
- Rawhide Kid #3 (Marvel MAX, 2003)
- The Amazing Spider-Man v2 #54 (Marvel, 2003)
- Marvel Knights Spider-Man #8 (Marvel, 2005)
- Black Panther #5 (Marvel, 2005)
- House of M #2 (Marvel, 2005)
- Witchblade #88-91, 94, 96 (Top Cow, 2005–2006)
- The Amazing Spider-Man #523 (Marvel, 2005)
- ABC: A-Z, Tom Strong and Jack B. Quick #1 (America's Best Comics, 2005)
- ABC: A-Z, Greyshirt and Cobweb #1 (America's Best Comics, 2006)
- ABC: A-Z, Terra Obscura and Splash Brannigan #1 (America's Best Comics, 2006)
- ABC: A-Z, Top 10 and Teams #1 (America's Best Comics, 2006)
- Action Comics #837-840 (DC Comics, 2006)
- Superman #650-653 (DC Comics, 2006)
- Birds of Prey #92-94 (DC Comics, 2006)
- Wonder Woman v3 #5-7, 10–13, 18 (DC Comics, 2007–2008)
- Countdown to Final Crisis #43-40 (DC Comics, 2007)
- Aquaman: Sword of Atlantis #54 (DC Comics, 2007)
- Ms. Marvel #25 (Marvel, 2008)
- Captain Marvel #4 (Marvel, 2008)
- Young X-Men #1-7 (Marvel, 2008)
- Secret Invasion: X-Men #1-4 (Marvel, 2008–2009)
- Daredevil v2 #111 (Marvel, 2008)
- Uncanny X-Men #520, 522, 526-529 (Marvel, 2009–2010)
- X-Men: Legacy #226-227 (Marvel, 2009)
- What If? Spider-Man: House of M #1 (Marvel, 2010)
- New Mutants #11 (Marvel, 2010)
- Atlas #1 (Marvel, 2010)
- Ultimate Doom #1 (Marvel, 2011)
- X-Men v3 #7-10 (Marvel, 2011)
- Fear Itself #4 (Marvel, 2011)
- Moon Knight #7 (Marvel, 2011)
- Ghost #1-3 (with Rachel Dodson, Dark Horse, 2014)
- Vampirella Volume 2 #1-6 (with Rachel Dodson, Dynamite, 2014)
- X-O Manowar #25 (Valiant, 2014)
- How to Pass As Human: A Guide to Assimilation For Future Androids (with Rachel Dodson, graphic novel, Dark Horse, 2015)

Preceded by none	Harley Quinn artist 2000–2002	Succeeded by Mike Huddleston
Preceded by Rags Morales	Wonder Woman artist 2006–2008	Succeeded by Aaron Lopresti
