= Revolution (Marvel Comics) =

Comics title and X-Men storyline

"Revolution" thematic stories

Publication information
- Publisher: Marvel Comics
Title(s)
Cable #79
Gambit #16
Generation X #63
Magneto: Dark Seduction #1
Uncanny X-Men #381
Wolverine #150
X-Force #102
X-Man #63
X-Men #100
- Formats: Multiple, thematically linked individual issues from multiple ongoing series.
- Genre: Superhero
- Publication date: May – June 2000
- Number of issues: 9

Creative team
- Writer(s): Warren Ellis; Chris Claremont; Ian Edginton

Reprints
- Collected editions
- Counter-X: Volume 1: X-Force: ISBN 0-7851-3304-6
- Counter-X: Volume 2: Generation X: ISBN 0-7851-3305-4
- Counter-X: Volume 3: X-Man: ISBN 0-7851-3306-2

"Revolution", known colloquially as "X-Revolution", was the title given to the May 2000 revamp of Marvel Comics' X-Men-related comic books, released at a time coinciding with the publication of X-Men vol. 2 #100.

== Publication history ==
In each series, the "Revolution" issue represented a jump of six months after the previous issues of events. In most cases, "Revolution" also marked an attempt to send each title in a new creative direction. To this end, new creative teams were assigned to the titles. Many costumes of the characters were redesigned, and a "Revolution" logo was printed along the right-hand side of each issue.

The most publicized of the changes was the return of writer Chris Claremont to the flagship titles X-Men vol. 2 and Uncanny X-Men, after nearly a decade's absence.

The event also included nods to early-1990s marketing strategies, such as printing variant covers and including trading cards.

The excitement of the event was dampened by Marvel Comics' timing, as most of the series involved had launched with the new creative teams a month before the real event—even though the "Revolution" logo was still printed on the May issues. Uncanny X-Men did not join the "Revolution" event until its June 2000 issue. Furthermore, Claremont stated in later interviews that he had ghostwritten several issues of various X-Men titles before the event.

=== Counter-X ===
As part of the Revolution event three X-titles, X-Man, X-Force, and Generation X were to be show-run by a longstanding creator working with new writers and artists. Rob Liefeld was originally approached to take over the titles, but he turned down the offer when he found out he would be unable to hire his own colorists. Warren Ellis was then approached, and the Counter-X line was born. Ellis plotted the general direction for each of the Counter-X books, and initially co-wrote each title with Steven Grant on X-Man, Ian Edginton on X-Force, and Brian Wood on Generation X.

=== Aftermath ===
The "Revolution" event was poorly received by fans and critics, leading to Claremont leaving X-Men and Uncanny X-Men after nine months. The X-Men line of books were revamped again in July 2001 with Grant Morrison writing New X-Men, Joe Casey writing Uncanny X-Men, and Claremont writing the new title X-Treme X-Men.

== Bibliography ==
The included issues, in order of publication, were:

- Cable #79, with new writer Robert Weinberg and recently arrived penciller Michael Ryan and inker Andrew Pepoy.
- Gambit #16, with recently arrived penciller Yanick Paquette and inker Sean Parsons.
- Generation X #63, with new co-writers Warren Ellis and Brian Wood, new penciller Steve Pugh, and new inker Sandu Florea.
- X-Men #100, with returning writer Chris Claremont, new penciller Leinil Francis Yu, and new inker Mark Morales
- Wolverine #150, with new writer/penciller Steve Skroce and new inker Lary Stucker (with "special thanks to" Lana Wachowski, and limited to a four-month story arc).
- X-Force #102, with new co-writers Warren Ellis and Ian Edginton, new penciller Whilce Portacio, and new inker Gerry Alanguilan.
- X-Man #63, with new co-writers Warren Ellis and Steven Grant and new artist Ariel Olivetti.
- Uncanny X-Men #381 (June 2000), with returning writer Chris Claremont, new penciller Adam Kubert, and new inker Tim Townsend.
- Magneto: Dark Seduction #1 (June 2000), the first issue of a mini-series by Fabian Nicieza, Roger Cruz, and Andy Owens.

=== Collected editions ===
The Revolution stories by Chris Claremont have been collected in a Marvel Omnibus

- X-Men: Revolution by Chris Claremont Omnibus (collects X-Men (1991) #100–109; X-Men Annual 2000; Uncanny X-Men #381–389; X-Men Unlimited (1993) #27–29; X-Men: Black Sun #1–5; Bishop: The Last X-Man #15–16; Cable (1993) #87, 904 pages, August 14, 2018 978-1-302-91214-7)

Other titles were collected as trade paperbacks

- Cable: Revolution (collects Cable #79–96, 440 pages, April 25, 2018, 978-1-302-91217-8)
- Wolverine: Blood Debt (collects Wolverine #150-153, 112 pages, July 30, 2001, 978-0785107859)

The Counter-X run was collected with its own sub-branded trade paperback:

- Volume 1: X-Force (collects X-Force #102-109, 192 pages, July 2008, ISBN 0-7851-3304-6)
- Volume 2: Generation X (collects Generation X #63-70, 192 pages, October 2008, ISBN 0-7851-3305-4)
- Volume 3: X-Man (collects X-Man #63-70, 192 pages, December 2008, ISBN 0-7851-3306-2)
- Volume 4: X-Force (collects X-Force #110-115, 102; Rough Cut, 176 pages, August 2012, ISBN 0-7851-5973-8)
- Volume 5: Generation X - Four Days (collects Generation X #71-74, February 26, 2013, ISBN 0785167307)
- Volume 6: X-Man: Fearful Symmetries (collects X-Man 71-75, material from X-Men Unlimited (1993) 31, 152 pages, April 23, 2013, ISBN 0785167315) * This volume was solicited for release but cancelled in March 2013 before being published.

== See also ==
- "One Year Later", a similar DC Comics event
