= Harley Quinn (comic book) =

American comic book series

- Cover of Harley Quinn #1; Art by Terry & Rachel Dodson

Publication information
- Publisher: DC Comics
- Format: Ongoing series
- Genre: Superhero
- Publication date: List: (vol. 1) December 2000 – January 2004 (vol. 2) January 2014 – September 2016 (vol. 3) October 2016 – October 2020 (vol. 4) May 2021 – present
- No. of issues: List: (vol. 1): 38 and one Special (vol. 2): 31 (issues #1-30 plus an issue numbered 0) and one Annual and eight Special (vol. 3): 75 (vol. 4): 56 and three Annuals (as of November 2025 cover date)
- Main character: Harley Quinn

Creative team
- Written by: List: (vol. 1) Karl Kesel A.J. Lieberman (vol. 2) Amanda Conner Jimmy Palmiotti (vol. 3) Amanda Conner Jimmy Palmiotti Frank Tieri Christopher Sebela Sam Humphries (vol. 4) Stephanie Phillips Tini Howard
- Penciller: List: (vol. 1) Terry Dodson Brandon Badeaux Craig Rousseau Mike Huddleston Nathan Fox Steve Yeowell
- Inker: List: (vol. 1) Rachel Dodson Rodney Ramos Dan Davis Troy Nixey Charles Adlard Nathan Fox Steve Yeowell (vol. 2)

Harley Quinn is an ongoing American comic book series featuring the DC Comics character Harley Quinn as its protagonist.

== Publication history ==
=== Volume 1 ===
While pursuing new assignments at DC Comics' offices in New York City, Karl Kesel was approached by former DC editor Matt Idelson to create a pitch for Harley Quinn's first ongoing series, which Kesel accepted, being a fan of the character after having read Paul Dini's Mad Love. Kesel chose Terry Dodson as the artist for the series, whose art Kesel thought complemented the character's cartoonish roots and worldview. Kesel called Dodson and asked him if he was interested on working on the comic, to which Dodson agreed, and the two worked for a month on their proposal for the series, which was to make a comic about "love gone horribly, terribly wrong". The proposal was accepted by DC Comics, and the pair began work on the series, with Kesel and Dodson both being involved in the storytelling, and Dodson bringing in his wife, Rachel Dodson, to ink. Kesel's run on the series began being published in December 2000, and was about Harley Quinn leaving the Joker and becoming a solo criminal, alongside a supporting cast of henchmen named the Quinntets. Because of underwhelming sales, his 25-issue run ended in December 2002, and DC decided to change the creative team; the series was given to writer A.J. Lieberman and artists Mike Huddleston and Troy Nixey by Idelson, and took on a grittier and darker direction, contrasting Kesel's run. The decision renewed interest in the character, but the sales remained lackluster and the series was cancelled in 2003.

=== Volume 2 ===
A second ongoing series as part of The New 52 was launced, written by husband and wife Jimmy Palmiotti and Amanda Conner, with the interior art illustrated by Chad Hardin and John Timms, explored Harley Quinn leaving Gotham City and starting her own life in her hometown of Brooklyn, depicting her as a landlord in Coney Island, where she shares an apartment building with a supporting cast of "sideshow freaks". Considered to be the most defining writers to work on the character since Dini and Bruce Timm, Palmiotti and Conner reinvented Harley Quinn as an antihero who has left her controlling relationship with the Joker behind.

In contrast to Harley Quinn's depiction in Adam Glass' run on Suicide Squad, Palmiotti and Conner wrote Harley Quinn with a lighthearted, cartoonish, and humorous tone. Harley was given a roller derby-inspired costume designed by Conner, which incorporates Conner's favorite aspects of Harley Quinn's early costume and her costume in Glass' run of Suicide Squad. The series also brought back Harley Quinn's red and black motif.

The New 52 Harley Quinn series received positive reception, and was also one of DC Comics' top-selling series, inspiring multiple spin-offs. The series was ended for the DC Rebirth relaunch of DC's titles.

=== Volume 3 ===
Harley Quinn's relaunched ongoing series is a direct continuation of the former, with Conner and Palmiotti still writing for the character, and Hardin and Timms illustrating the interior art. After having written 64 issues of Harley Quinn's ongoing series, Conner and Palmiotti's five-year run ended with the 34th issue of the series in December 2017, with writer Frank Tieri and artist Inaki Miranda taking over the title. Tieri's run on the series ended with the series' 42nd issue, followed by a two-issue storyline written by Christopher Sebela and illustrated by Mirka Andolfo. By issue #45 in July 2018, Sam Humphries was the new writer for the series, with John Timms returning to provide art. The series ended in August 2020.

=== Volume 4 ===
In DC's 2021 relaunch of its monthly comics titles, Infinite Frontier, Harley Quinn moves back to Gotham City as a superheroine, where she frequently interacts with and aids the Batman family, and she is given a new design by Riley Rossmo. Harley Quinn's fourth ongoing series, written by Stephanie Phillips and illustrated by Rossmo, depicts her "actively looking to make up for her past sins", alongside a former Joker henchman named Kevin. Harley Quinn also has a prominent role in the "Fear State" crossover event.

In January 2022, Phillips confirmed Harley would be resuming her previous career as a psychologist.

== Collected editions ==
Vol. #	Title	Material collected	Pages	Publication date	ISBN
Harley Quinn (2007–2014)
1	Preludes and Knock Knock Jokes	Harley Quinn #1–7	192	December 2007	978-1401216573
2	Night and Day	Harley Quinn #8–13 and Harley Quinn: Our Worlds at War	190	June 2013	978-1401240417
3	Welcome to Metropolis	Harley Quinn #14–25	288	March 2014	978-1401245955
4	Vengeance Unlimited	Harley Quinn #26–38	314	September 2014	978-1401250683
5	Harley Quinn by Karl Kesel and Terry Dodson: The Deluxe Edition Book One	Harley Quinn #1–8	224	September 2017	978-1401276423
6	Harley Quinn by Karl Kesel and Terry Dodson: The Deluxe Edition Book Two	Harley Quinn #9–19	288	November 2018	978-1401285098
Harley Quinn (vol. 2) (2014–2016)
1	Hot in the City	Harley Quinn (vol. 2) #0–8	224	October 2014	978-1401254155
2	Power Outage	Harley Quinn (vol. 2) #9–13; Harley Quinn Futures End #1; Harley Quinn Invades Comic-Con International San Diego; material from Secret Origin #4	208	April 2015	978-1401257637
3	Kiss Kiss Bang Stab	Harley Quinn (vol. 2) #14–16, Annual #1; Harley Quinn Holiday Special #1; Harley Quinn Valentine's Special #1	168	December 2015	978-1401262525
4	A Call to Arms	Harley Quinn (vol. 2) #17–21 and Harley Quinn Road Trip Special #1	176	June 2016	978-1401269296
5	The Joker's Last Laugh	Harley Quinn (vol. 2) #22–25 and Harley Quinn: Be Careful What You Wish For	144	September 2016	978-1401271992
6	Black, White and Red All Over	Harley Quinn (vol. 2) #26–30	144	January 2017	978-1401272593
7	Harley Quinn Omnibus by Amanda Conner and Jimmy Palmiotti Vol. One	Harley Quinn (vol. 2) #0–16, Annual #1; Harley Quinn: Futures End #1; Harley Quinn Invades Comic-Con International San Diego; Harley Quinn Holiday Special #1; Harley Quinn Valentine's Special #1; Harley Quinn and Power Girl #1–6; material from Secret Origin #4	768	September 2017	978-1401276430
8	Harley Quinn Omnibus by Amanda Conner and Jimmy Palmiotti Vol. Two	Harley Quinn (vol. 2) #17–30, Harley Quinn Road Trip Special #1, Harley Quinn: Be Careful What You Wish For – Special Edition, Harley Quinn and Her Gang of Harleys #1–6 and Harley's Little Black Book #1–6	864	October 2018	978-1401284565
Harley Quinn (vol. 3) (2016–2018)
1	Die Laughing	Harley Quinn (vol. 3) #1–7	168	March 2017	978-1401268312
2	Joker Loves Harley	Harley Quinn (vol. 3) #8–13	144	June 2017	978-1401270957
3	Red Meat	Harley Quinn (vol. 3) #14–21	168	September 2017	978-1401273699
4	Harley Quinn: The Rebirth Deluxe Edition Book 1	Harley Quinn (vol. 3) #1–13	304	September 2017	978-1401273682
5	Surprise, Surprise	Harley Quinn (vol. 3) #22–27 and Harley Quinn 25th Anniversary Special	168	January 2018	978-1401275266
6	Vote Harley	Harley Quinn (vol. 3) #28–34	168	May 2018	978-1401278823
7	Harley Quinn: The Rebirth Deluxe Edition Book 2	Harley Quinn (vol. 3) #14–27 and Harley Quinn 25th Anniversary Special	384	July 2018	978-1401280659
8	Angry Bird	Harley Quinn (vol. 3) #35–42	192	August 2018	978-1401281526
9	Harley vs. Apokolips	Harley Quinn (vol. 3) #43–49	168	December 2018	978-1401285074
10	Harley Quinn: The Rebirth Deluxe Edition Book 3	Harley Quinn (vol. 3) #28–42	392	January 2019	978-1401285531
11	Harley Destroys the Universe	Harley Quinn (vol. 3) #50–54 and 56	160	April 2019	978-1401288099
12	The Trials of Harley Quinn	Harley Quinn (vol. 3) #55 and 57–63	208	October 2019	978-1401291914
13	Harley Quinn Omnibus by Amanda Conner and Jimmy Palmiotti Three	Harley Quinn (vol. 3) #1–34, Harley Quinn 25th Anniversary Special #1 and material from Batman Day Special #1	800	October 2019	978-1401294465
14	The Final Trial	Harley Quinn (vol. 3) #64–69 and Harley Quinn: Villain of the Year #1	208	March 2020	978-1401294557
15	Hollywood or Die	Harley Quinn (vol. 3) #70–75	176	April 2021	978-1779503091
Harley Quinn (vol. 4) (2021–present)
1	No Good Deed	Batman: Urban Legends #1 and Harley Quinn (vol. 4) #1–6	168	December 2021	978-1779513465
2	Keepsake	Harley Quinn (vol. 4) #7–12, Annual 2021	168	August 2022	978-1779516633
3	Verdict	Harley Quinn (vol. 4) #13-17 and Harley Quinn 30th Anniversary Special	144	March 2023	978-1779521170
4	Task Force XX	Harley Quinn (vol. 4) #18-21, 2022 Annual #1 and material from Shadow War Zone #1	168	September 2023	978-1779521187
5	Who Killed Harley Quinn?	Harley Quinn (vol. 4) #22-27	168	March 2024	978-1779524799
1	Girl In A Crisis	Harley Quinn (vol. 4) #28-31 and Knight Terrors: Harley Quinn #1-2	196	September 2024	978-1779528230
2	Eye Don't Like Me?	Harley Quinn (vol. 4) #32-37	176	November 2024	978-1779528421
3	Clown About Town	Harley Quinn (vol. 4) #38-43	176	March 2025	978-1799500872
1	Destructive Comics	Harley Quinn (vol. 4) #44-49	152	July 2025	978-1799502210
2	Friends with Detriments	Harley Quinn (vol. 4) #50-57	216	March 2026	978-1799502531

=== DC Finest ===
Title	Material collected	Pages	Publication date	ISBN
DC FInest: Harley Quinn: Birth of the Mirth	Harley Quinn (vol. 1) #1-8; Action Comics #765; Batman: Legends of the Dark Knight #126; The Batman Adventures #12; Azrael: Agent of the Bat #60; Batman #570, 573–574; Batman: Shadow of the Bat #93; Detective Comics #737, 740–741; Catwoman #82–84, 89; The Batman Adventures: Mad Love #1; Batman: Harley Quinn #1; Batman: Gotham Knights #14	624	February 18, 2025	978-1799500483
The Ballad of Harley Quinn	Harley Quinn (vol. 1) #9-25; Harley Quinn: Our Worlds at War #1; Harley and Ivy: Love on the Lam #1; Gotham Girls #1-5	616	September 1, 2026	978-1799509127

== Other books ==
Title	Material collected	Writer and artist	Pages	Publication date	ISBN
Batman: Harley and Ivy	Batman: Harley and Ivy #1–3; Harley and Ivy: Love on the Lam; a story from Batman: Black and White Vol. 2	Paul Dini, Judd Winick (story); Bruce Timm, Joe Chiodo (art)	136	July 2007	978-1401213336
Batman: Mad Love and Other Stories	The Batman Adventures: Mad Love, Batman Adventures Annual #1–2, Batman Adventures Holiday Special, Adventures in the DC Universe #3 and Batman Black and White #1	Paul Dini, Bruce Timm, Glen Murakami (story); Bruce Timm, Mike Parobeck, Matt Wagner, Dan DeCarlo, Klaus Janson, and Glen Murakami (art)	208	September 2011	978-1401231156
Batman Adventures: Mad Love Deluxe Edition	The Batman Adventures: Mad Love	Paul Dini (story); Bruce Timm (art)	144	April 2015	978-1401255121
Harley and Ivy: The Deluxe Edition	Batman: Harley and Ivy #1–3, Batman Adventures Annual #1, Batman Adventures Holiday Annual #1, Batman: Gotham Knights #14 and Batman: Black and White #3	Various	176	February 2016	978-1401260804
Harley Quinn and Power Girl	Harley Quinn and Power Girl #1–6	Amanda Conner and Jimmy Palmiotti (story); Stéphane Roux (art)	144	March 2016	978-1401259747
Harley Quinn's Gang of Harleys	Harley Quinn and Her Gang of Harleys #1–6	Frank Tieri and Jimmy Palmiotti; Mauricet (art)	152	February 2017	978-1401267858
Harley's Little Black Book	Harley's Little Black Book #1–8	Amanda Conner and Jimmy Palmiotti (story); Amanda Conner, John Timms, Mauricet, Joseph Michael Linsner, Billy Tucci, Flaviano, Neal Adams, and Simon Bisley (art)	256	November 2018	978-1401273606
Harley Loves Joker	Harley Loves Joker #1–2 and backstories from Harley Quinn (vol. 3) #17–25	Paul Dini and Jimmy Palmiotti (story); Bret Blevins and J. Bone	128	December 2018	978-1401283490
Old Lady Harley	Old Lady Harley #1–5 and Harley Quinn (vol. 3) #42	Frank Tieri (story); Inaki Miranda, Tom Derenick, and Mauricet (art)	152	July 2019	978-1401292164
Harley & Ivy Meet Betty & Veronica	Harley & Ivy Meet Betty & Veronica #1–6	Marc Andreyko and Paul Dini (story); Laura Braga (art)	160	September 2019	978-1401292751
Harley Quinn and Poison Ivy	Harley Quinn and Poison Ivy #1–6	Jody Houser (story); Adriana Melo, Wade Von Grawbadger, and Mark Morales (art)	152	May 2021	978-1779505989
Harley Quinn Black + White + Red	Harley Quinn Black + White + Red #1–17 and two new original stories published here for the first time ever	Various	224	June 2021	978-1779509956
Harley Quinn: The Animated Series Vol. 1: The Eat. Bang! Kill. Tour	Harley Quinn: The Animated Series Vol. 1: The Eat. Bang! Kill. Tour #1–6	Tee Franklin (story); Max Sarin and Erich Owen (art)	144	August 2022	978-1779516640

=== DC Black Label ===
Harley Quinn stars in various series under DC Comics' adult-oriented Black Label imprint.

Title	Material collected	Writer and artist	Pages	Publication date	ISBN
Harleen	Harleen #1–3	Stjepan Šejić (story and art)	200	February 2020	978-1779501110
Harley Quinn & the Birds of Prey: The Hunt for Harley	Harley Quinn & the Birds of Prey #1–4; a short story from Harley Quinn Black + White + Red #12	Amanda Conner and Jimmy Palmiotti (story); Amanda Conner and Chad Hardin (art)	160	March 2021	978-1779504494
Joker/Harley: Criminal Sanity	Joker/Harley: Criminal Sanity #1–8 and Joker/Harley: Criminal Sanity Secret Files (the 2022 edition adds a story from Harley Quinn 30th Anniversary Special #1)	Kami Garcia (story); Mico Suayan, Jason Badower, and Mike Mayhew (art)	304 312	September 2021 September 2022	978-1779512024 978-1779517203
Harley Quinn & the Gotham City Sirens Omnibus	Gotham City Sirens #1–26 and Catwoman #83	648	April 2018 September 2022	978-1401278397 978-1779516763	
Harley Quinn: 30 Years of the Maid of Mischief Deluxe Edition	The Batman Adventures #12, Detective Comics #831, The Batman and Robin Adventures #18, Batman: Gotham Adventures #10, Batman: Gotham Knights #14, Harley Quinn #3, Gotham City Sirens #20–21, Harley Quinn Holiday Special #1, Harley Quinn: Be Careful What You Wish For Special Edition #1, Harley Quinn 25th Anniversary Special #1, Harley Quinn: Make 'em Laugh #3, Harley Quinn Black + White + Red #14, Batman #98 and a story from Harley Quinn 30th Anniversary Special #1	336	September 2022	978-1779517180	

== See also ==
- Batman (comic book)
- Catwoman (comic book)
- Gotham City Sirens
- Harley & Ivy Meet Betty & Veronica
- The Joker (comic book)
- Poison Ivy (2022 comic book)
