= Black Cat (Marvel Comics) =

Fictional character in Marvel Comics

- Cover art from The Amazing Spider-Man #25 (March 2017). Art by Stanley "Artgerm" Lau.

Publication information
- Publisher: Marvel Comics
- First appearance: The Amazing Spider-Man #194 (July 1979)
- Created by: Marv Wolfman; Dave Cockrum

In-story information
- Alter ego: Felicia Sara Hardy
- Species: Human mutate
- Team affiliations: Avengers; A-Force; Black Cat's Gang; Heroes for Hire; Defenders
- Partnerships: Spider-Man
- Notable aliases: Felicity Harmon; Felicia Harmon; Party Hardy; Black Cat; Queenpin; Cat Hardy (Spider-Noir)
- Abilities: Psionic ability to alter probability fields to cause bad luck toward others; Expert burglar; Highly skilled martial artist, gymnast, and acrobat; Utilizes retractable claws, grapnel, and contact lenses granting the ability to see in various ranges of the electromagnetic spectrum

Altered in-story information for adaptations to other media
- Partnerships: Michael Morbius (Spider-Man: The Animated Series); Spider-Noir: Spider-Man Noir; Flint Marko; Silvermane

Black Cat is a fictional character appearing in American comic books published by Marvel Comics. Created by Marv Wolfman and Dave Cockrum, the character first appeared in The Amazing Spider-Man #194 in July 1979 as an adversary of the superhero Spider-Man, although she later becomes his on-off love interest and ally.

In the Marvel Universe, Black Cat is the alter ego of Felicia Sara Hardy, the daughter of renowned cat burglar Walter Hardy. Trained in martial arts and acrobatics, she follows in her father's footsteps and initially comes into conflict with Spider-Man until the two fall in love, leading to a brief partnership in crime-fighting. Their relationship is complicated when it becomes apparent that Black Cat has no interest in Spider-Man's civilian identity as Peter Parker. Despite their break-up, Spider-Man's positive influence motivates Black Cat to remain an antiheroine willing to do the right thing when push comes to shove, and routinely returns to the hero's life as one of his most trusted allies. Black Cat has gained and lost superhuman powers several times throughout her comic book history, most notably possessing a "bad luck" aura capable of inflicting people in her vicinity with misfortune.

Since her original introduction in comics, the character has been featured in various other Marvel-licensed products, including solo series, video games, animated television series, and merchandise. Felicia Hardy made her live-action debut in the film The Amazing Spider-Man 2 (2014), portrayed by Felicity Jones, and an alternate version of the character based on the Marvel Noir incarnation named Cat Hardy appears in the television series Spider-Noir, portrayed by Li Jun Li.

== Publication history ==
Black Cat from the Spider-Man/Black Cat: The Evil That Men Do miniseries.

In 1979, creator Marv Wolfman was looking for a female foil for Spider-Woman. He decided to base a character on Bad Luck Blackie, a cartoon directed by Tex Avery for MGM, in which a black cat brought misfortune to anyone in close proximity but uses this to protect a kitten. The Black Cat's costume and appearance were designed by Dave Cockrum.

When Wolfman changed writing assignments within Marvel Comics to The Amazing Spider-Man, he brought his character with him. He and Cockrum made considerable changes to the character and her appearance over this time; the Black Cat intended to debut in Spider-Woman had only her name and powers in common with the one who finally appeared in The Amazing Spider-Man. On the bottom of the letters page of The Amazing Spider-Man #194 (July 1979), a thumbnail of the intended cover for Spider-Woman #9 (December 1978) appears along with a rejected cover for The Amazing Spider-Man #194. Wolfman said in an interview:

I didn't plan Black Cat to be in Spidey. I created her for Spider-Woman (look at the letter column of the first B.C. story and you'll see). I then decided to leave Spider-Woman and moved her over. So, I never even thought of Catwoman when I did her. I got the idea for her from a Tex Avery cartoon, Bad Luck Blackie".

Black Cat's first comic book appearance was drawn by Amazing Spider-Man's (at that time) regular penciller Keith Pollard. For her first couple decades the Black Cat was primarily a supporting character, but she starred in the 8-page story "The Crown Jewel Caper" in Marvel Comics Presents #57 (August 1990), written by Dwight Jon Zimmerman and pencilled by Mike Harris. According to Zimmerman, the story did not appear in the issue it was originally scheduled for, and when he asked why it had not been published yet, Marvel Comics Presents's editor Terry Kavanaugh told him that the inker had murdered his wife, in the process spilling blood on the pages he was inking, and consequently the artwork for the story was being held as state's evidence for the murder trial. As was his habit, Zimmerman had saved full-size photocopies of the pencilled pages, so the story was re-inked by Josef Rubenstein and published.

Writer/director Kevin Smith began writing the Spider-Man/Black Cat: The Evil That Men Do miniseries in 2002. After the third issue the series went on a hiatus until 2005, when Smith revealed he had finally finished writing the scripts. Smith has stated, "While I have zero defense for my lateness (particularly when folks like [Brian Michael] Bendis turn out great stories in multiple books on a monthly basis), I will say this: it's a much better story now than it would've been had I completed it back in '02."

In the mid-2000s, she starred alongside Spider-Man in Spider-Man/Black Cat and Spider-Man: Black Cat, and with Wolverine in a limited comic book miniseries titled Claws. A sequel to this miniseries, entitled Claws II, began publication in July 2011. Black Cat was a lead character in the 2006–2007 Heroes for Hire series. The Black Cat ongoing series written by Jed MacKay debuted in June 2019, a relaunch following in 2020, as well as the team-up series Iron Cat, Mary Jane & Black Cat, and Jackpot & Black Cat. A new Black Cat series, written by G. Willow Wilson and drawn by Gleb Melnikov, was announced in May 2025 to begin publication in August 2025.

== Characterization ==
=== Fictional character biography ===
Felicia Hardy grew up believing that her father, world-famous cat burglar Walter Hardy, had died in a plane crash; in truth, her mother, Lydia, concealed from her that he had been imprisoned. As a freshman at Empire State University, Felicia was date raped by her boyfriend, Ryan, and channeled the trauma into martial arts and acrobatics training with the intent of killing him, but he died in a drunk driving accident before she could act on her revenge. Turning to crime in her father's image, Felicia adopted the costumed identity of the Black Cat and broke into a police precinct to plan a jailbreak, freeing the terminally ill Walter so that he could die at home rather than in prison; Walter died shortly afterward, despite Spider-Man's attempts to stop the escape.

Continuing her career as a cat burglar, Felicia developed a fixation on Spider-Man, amassing a collection of romance-themed stolen objects and building a shrine to him in her apartment. When Spider-Man tracked her down, she initially allowed him to believe she was psychologically unstable so that he would have her committed to a mental hospital rather than jail, later revealing the breakdown had been a ruse to facilitate her escape. A romance between the two developed after the Black Cat was critically injured by Doctor Octopus; while she recovered, Spider-Man unmasked himself to her, but Felicia reacted with dismay, telling him to put his mask back on, as she preferred the mystery of Spider-Man to the ordinariness of Peter Parker.

Feeling that her lack of superhuman abilities made her a liability to Spider-Man, Felicia sought out powers of her own and was granted a "bad luck" ability by a mysterious benefactor who turned out to be the Kingpin. When the power began to endanger Spider-Man as well as her enemies, and Felicia proved unwilling to disclose its source, Spider-Man ended their relationship. Doctor Strange later removed the lingering effects from Spider-Man, inadvertently transforming Felicia's bad-luck power into heightened feline physical abilities, including claws and enhanced agility. She subsequently allied with, and then betrayed, the assassin the Foreigner in a scheme against Spider-Man, fleeing to Europe afterward.

Upon returning to New York, Felicia was devastated to learn that Peter had married Mary Jane Watson in her absence. Seeking to make him jealous, she began dating his friend Flash Thompson, only to develop genuine feelings for him; Flash ultimately ended their relationship, revealing that he had known her secret identity all along. During the Civil War, Felicia registered under the Superhuman Registration Act and joined Misty Knight's Heroes for Hire, later aiding the Fearless Defenders. After the Superior Spider-Man treated her as a common criminal, Felicia became the leader of a criminal organization, regaining enhanced bad-luck powers through her association with Mr. Negative before eventually returning to vigilantism.

In later years, Felicia infiltrated Stark Industries to construct her own "Iron Cat" armor, joined other heroes in repelling the symbiote god Knull's invasion of Earth, and became entangled in a conflict involving her mentor, the Black Fox, and the international Thieves Guild, led by her rival Odessa Drake. She also teamed with Mary Jane Watson to steal the mystical Soulsword from the demon lord Belasco in the dimension of Limbo, splitting its power between them to thwart his plans.

=== Powers and abilities ===
Initially, the Black Cat had no superhuman abilities. Later, a test induced by the Kingpin gave her the psionic ability to affect probability fields; essentially, she could produce "bad luck" for her enemies. The "bad luck" power entails that under stress she is subconsciously able to cause anyone in her immediate vicinity that she perceives as a threat to be susceptible to freak accidents, like guns jamming and exploding, or tripping on objects. This ability also had the side effect of eventually causing problems for anyone spending long periods of time around her.

Doctor Strange eventually tampered with her powers that briefly removed her bad luck abilities, along with the unwanted side effect. However, this magical tampering temporarily endowed her with cat-like abilities, giving her night vision, retractable talons in her fingertips, superhuman speed, strength, agility and endurance, proportionate to a cat. Her psionic "bad luck" powers and former temporary abilities were eventually restored by Doctor Tramma through the use of cybernetics.

The Black Cat has reflexes, agility, and stamina of an Olympic level acrobat. She is physically very strong and athletic and has great physical endurance. She is an excellent street fighter capable of taking on several armed assailants and incapacitating them without being injured herself. She is trained in several martial arts styles, including Judo and Goju Ryu Karate. Hardy is a talented photographer; while dating Spider-Man she takes pictures of the hero that he admits are better than his own work.

=== Equipment ===
The Black Cat has also acquired several devices from the Tinkerer that increase her agility and heighten her strength. She wears earrings that interact with the balance centers of her brain to grant her enhanced agility. She has contact lenses that let her see in various ranges of the electromagnetic spectrum, such as infrared and ultraviolet. Her costume contains micro-servos that enhance her strength above normal human levels. The gloves of her costume contain steel micro-filaments, which form retractable claws at the fingertips when she flexes her fingers (triggering a magnetic surge which condenses the filaments into polarized talons) which enable her to tear through most surfaces and easily scale walls. Using this equipment, the Black Cat has been able to beat enemies who have superhuman abilities.

The Black Cat has a miniature grappling hook device hidden in the "fur" of each glove, designed by her father Walter Hardy which enables her to swing from buildings in a manner similar to Spider-Man, though not quite as fast. She can also use the cable from this device as a tightrope, wall scaling device, swing line, or as a weapon in combat.

== Cultural impact and legacy ==
=== Critical response ===
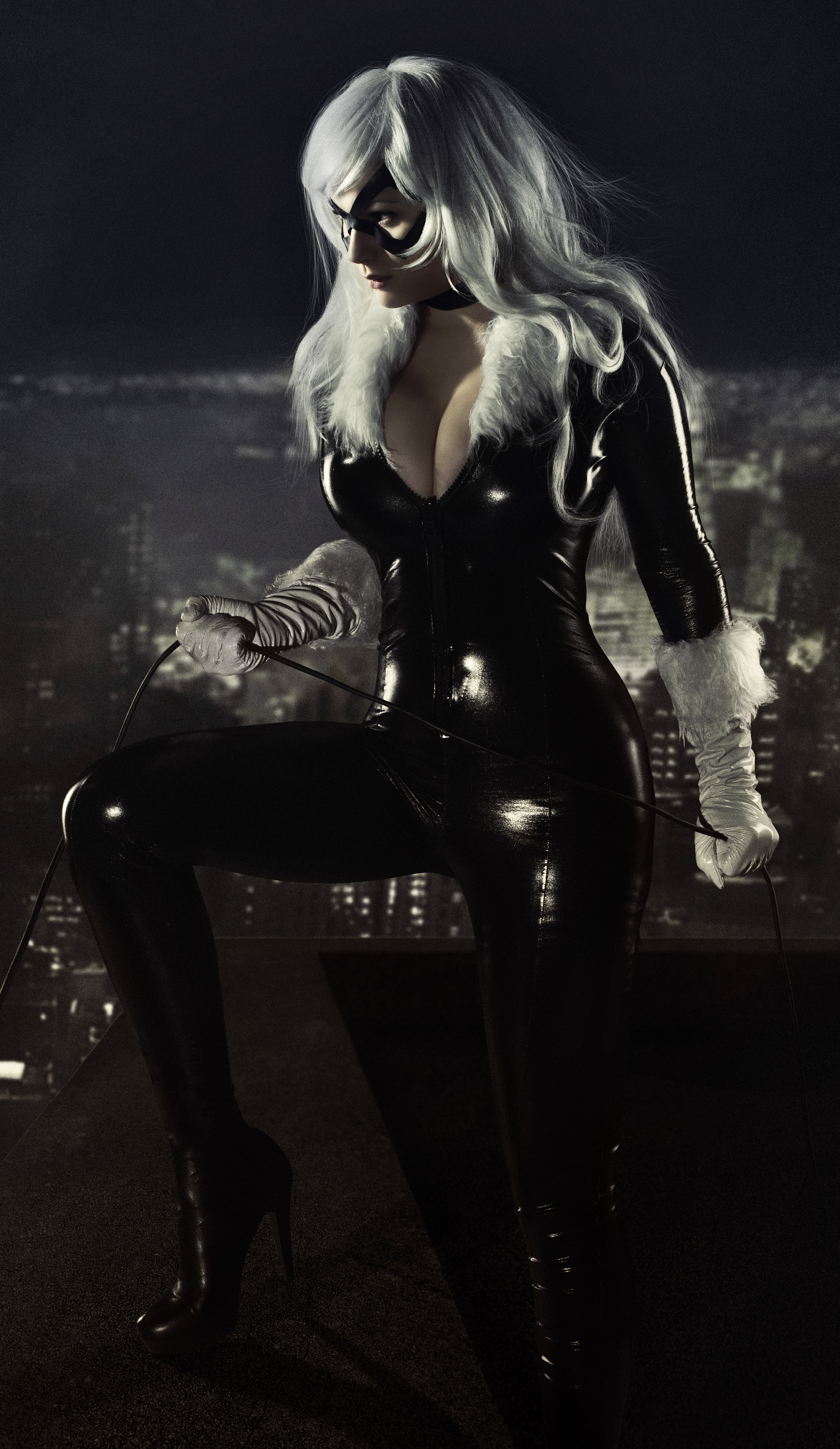
A cosplayer dressed as Felicia Hardy / Black Cat

Liam McGuire of Screen Rant referred to Black Cat as a "fan-favorite figure in the comics", writing, "The character has become an A-list character in the comics, as her costume, personality, and playfulness - all displayed in the piece - have captured the attention of readers and turned Black Cat into an antihero they are thrilled to see pop up in stories." Elliot Swan of Comic Book Resources called Black Cat "interesting and complex", saying, "She has proven herself as a hero worthy of the chance to develop outside the web of Spider-Man and has developed beyond being a footnote in the life of Marvel's iconic web-slinger. [...] Jed Mackay has been instrumental in igniting a new era of passionate fanfare for Black Cat, and she is very deserving of the acclaim. Felicia Hardy has not only been loyal to Spider-Man, but she continues to be an exciting three-dimensional heroine who shines outside the shadows of her male counterparts." Joseph Baxter of Den of Geek described Black Cat as an "A-list Spider-Man character", stating, "Felicia initially arrived as a formidable-fighter of a thief in the web-thwipping crosshairs of Spidey, having learned the trade from her legendary thief of a father. However, she eventually proved that she possesses a moral fiber, which resulted in Felicia becoming an ally against evil and on-again-off-again romantic interest for Spidey (in a dynamic that one could argue too closely mirrors DC's Batman and Catwoman). Regardless, the character has remained a staple in Spidey's comic book universe." Peyton Hinckle of ComicsVerse referred to Black Cat as "the shining example in comics of an independent woman who can find happiness outside of relationships," asserting, "Thankfully, we somehow, against the odds, have Black Cat, who completely defies those norms. She's a bluntly sexual character who is also hilarious. She doesn't have to be a man to crack a joke about body parts or to banter with Spider-Man about the Green Goblin's latest hair cut. Her willingness to be sexually appealing doesn't mean she can't snort when she laughs. She can be smart, sexy, funny, and creative and still be the same woman."

Deirdre Kaye of Scary Mommy called Black Cat a "role model" and a "truly heroic" female character. Eric Diaz of Nerdist wrote, "Although initially created as a Catwoman-like, sexy cat burglar villain for Spider-Man to fight back in 1979, much like her DC counterpart, Felicia Hardy had a soft spot for the hero she battled the most. Eventually, Felicia got romantically involved with Spidey, and she learned his true identity long before his main squeeze Mary Jane ever did. Over the years, she has had several stories which focused on her and developed her backstory, making her way more than just Marvel's Catwoman." Dana Forsythe of Syfy stated, "Beloved as one of the Marvel Universe's best burglars and foil to the amazing Spider-Man, Felicia Hardy has walked the fine line of anti-hero and villain since she made her debut in Amazing Spider-Man #194." Susana Polo of Polygon stated, "Catwoman predates Black Cat by several decades, and they're both infamous female cat burglars who wear black, skintight costumes. They both have "cat" in their name. And they both enjoy a will-they-won't-they relationship with an urban male superhero — Batman and Spider-Man, respectively — who feels conflicted about dating them because of their illegal activities. But the unlikely truth is that all of those similarities are pure coincidence — or maybe just Felicia Hardy's bad luck to be created second [...] Stories of deliberate ripoffs and open inspiration are so common in the comics world that nobody could be faulted for thinking there was some funny business going on in Black Cat's creation. But what actually happened is even more interesting. Black Cat and Catwoman are a rare, genuine example of convergent evolution."

Anthony Orlando of BuzzFeed said, "Now that Peter and MJ have officially separated, now is the perfect time for him to meet the Black Cat. Born Felicia Hardy, this cat burglar became Spider-Man's partner/girlfriend, and she has repeatedly fought alongside him over the years, making her increasingly popular with fans. Though she may seem like a copycat of Catwoman, Hardy is still a fascinating and complex character all her own, and she could provide much-needed support to Spider-Man in his new, lonely life." Rachel Leishman of The Mary Sue called Black Cat "incredibly interesting", writing, "For a character who is beloved in the world of comics, Felicia Hardy hasn't really had her time. By that, I mean her time in the live-action world. With three separate movie franchises built around Peter Parker, you'd think that we'd have more of her in our films. Instead, we have Felicity Jones in The Amazing Spider-Man 2, and … that's pretty much it. (Granted, we were supposed to have her in one of the Raimi films, but alas.) So now, with a plethora of rumors surrounding the Spider-Verse (like the fact that we could be getting a show led by Silk and the Olivia Wilde movie heading our way) and who we're going to get in the live-action form, my pitch is for a Black Cat anything Whether it's just in the Tom Holland movies or in a franchise all her own, Felicia Hardy deserves her time." Nahila Bonfiglio of The Daily Dot asserted, "One of the things that many viewers love about the current iteration of Spider-Man is his charming innocence, something that doesn't mesh well with a character like Black Cat. While every iteration of Peter Parker carries some degree of good-natured naiveté, at his current age, he's better equipped to handle adversaries who don't utilize their sex appeal. In the future, however, Black Cat would make a welcome addition to the MCU, as a cameo or full movie. Fans of the comics and films alike would love to see Peter Parker mature, and the inclusion of such an engaging, complicated antiheroine would no doubt delight viewers. We don't know if it will ever happen, but here's hoping the future sees plenty more Black Cat on the big—and small—screen." Joshua Medina of MovieWeb stated, "With Tom Holland's Spider-Man having fantastic success in the MCU and possibly getting a second trilogy of movies, fans can only hope to see the stunning and cunning Black Cat in action. She is quite literally Spider-Man's Kryptonite in human form; she is such a pure and seductive beauty," while Chance Arradondo ranked her 9th in their "Anti-Heroes That Deserve Their Own Movie" list.

Anthony Orlando of Digital Trends included Black Cat in their "12 new Marvel Characters We Want To See In The Spider-Man 4 Movie" list. Jesse Schedeen of IGN asserted, "Spider-Man doesn't have a lot of iconic female villains (Peter Parker isn't the type to punch a girl if he can help it), but he does have Black Cat. Black Cat is similar to Catwoman, both in the sense that she's a skilled thief who dresses with a cat motif and because she has a complicated and sometimes romantic relationship with Spidey. That's not to say Felicia Hardy is a carbon copy of Selina Kyle. She's a complex character who looks out mostly for herself and struggles to move forward from a rough youth," included Black Cat in their "Marvel's Femme Fatales" list, and ranked her 24th in their "Top 25 Spider-Man Villains" list. Sideshow ranked Black Cat 3rd in their "Top 10 Cat-Themed Comic Book Characters" list. Mark Ginocchio of ComicBook.com ranked Black Cat 7th in their "7 Best Female Characters from the Spider-Man Multiverse" list. Bust ranked Black Cat 7th in their "13 Female Marvel Characters Who Kick Ass" list, saying, "With training in aerobics and stunts, she is no stranger to slinking from roof to roof. Black Cat dates Spider-Man, and is basically the coolest bad girl in town."

Screen Rant included Black Cat in their "10 Best Marvel Characters Who Made Their Debut In Spider-Man Comics" list, in their "10 Spider-Man Villains That Should Get A Solo Movie" list, in their "10 Most Powerful Vigilantes In Marvel Comics" list, and in their "10 Best Spider-Man Comics Characters Not In The MCU" list, and ranked her 3rd in their "10 Best Relationships in Spider-Man Comics" list, 10th in their in their "Spider-Man: 10 Best Female Villains" list, 10th in their "10 Most Powerful Silk Villains In Marvel Comics" list, and 10th in their "10 LGBTQ+ Marvel Heroes That Should Join The MCU" list. Comic Book Resources ranked Black Cat 2nd in their "Spider-Man's 10 Coolest Allies" list, 3rd in their "Spider-Man: His 10 Best Sidekicks" list, 3rd in their "10 Best Spider-Man Villains Missing From No Way Home" list, 5th in their "10 Most Attractive Marvel Villains" list, 9th in their "10 Best Cat-Themed Superheroes In Comics" list, 10th in their "10 Spider-Man Villains Fans Grew To Love" list, 10th in their "Marvel's 10 Best Heroes Who Use Luck To Their Advantage" list, and 11th in their "25 Best Anti-Heroes In Marvel Comics" list.

== Literary reception ==
=== Volumes ===
==== Spider-Man/Black Cat: Evil That Men Do (2002) ====
According to Diamond Comic Distributors, Spider-Man/Black Cat: The Evil That Men Do #1 was the 2nd best selling comic book in June 2002. Spider-Man/Black Cat: The Evil That Men Do #1 was the 14th best selling comic book in 2002.

Shawn S. Lealos of Screen Rant ranked the Spider-Man/Black Cat: The Evil That Men Do comic book series 1st in their "10 Must-Read Comics Written By Clerks Creator Kevin Smith" list, writing, "One of the most controversial comic book storylines Kevin Smith ever wrote came with Marvel Comics' series Spider-Man/Black Cat: The Evil That Men Do. The controversy here was part of the Women in Fridges concept, as Smith had someone sexually assault Black Cat as a kickoff for the story. The series attempted to look at how this assault turned Felicia into the woman she became, but the problem is that this was not a series that fans liked reading at the time because it took Smith four years to finish it. The first issue hit in 2002, and he didn't release the sixth and final issue until 2006. Now, fans can pick up the entire series and read it all the way through for one of Smith's more thoughtful comic book stories." Spider-Man and Black Cat find themselves begrudgingly working together again when their cases overlap. But things take a dark turn when Felicia is arrested for the murder of rapist, Garrison Klum: A crime she didn't commit. Facing the death penalty, Peter hires Matt Murdock to act as her lawyer, with the pair dedicated to saving their feline friend. It's not a series for the faint-hearted, as Smith tackles some difficult and disturbing subject matter, revealing the tragic past of not one but two infamous Spider-rogues."

==== Claws (2006) ====
According to Diamond Comic Distributors, Claws #1 was the 60th best selling comic book in August 2006. Claws #2 was the 69th best selling comic book in September 2006. Claws #3 was the 71st best selling comic book in October 2006.

Craig Lines of Den of Geek stated, "The tone of Jimmy Palmiotti and Justin Gray's script, although quite violent, is very much classic romantic adventure, with Wolverine and Black Cat trading flirtatious banter and saucy body language as they splat bad dudes. It's the sort of naughty comedy-action romp that Kevin Smith started and should've finished with his failed The Evil That Men Do mini-series (as opposed to the jumbled, misogynistic angst-fest it became). Whilst not exactly challenging, there are some good laughs and even a touch of suspense. In addition to zippy writing, the artwork is also consistently nice. I liked Joe Linsner's interpretation of the Black Cat costume and, having seen her drawn so atrociously in recent years (come on down, Clayton Crain), Claws scores points on that front alone. On the down side, the mini-series is maybe an issue too short and I personally felt it lost its pace a little in Issue Three with an extended (and utterly unnecessary) flashback sequence, but otherwise, Claws is a sharp little critter and well worth getting your paws on." Kirsten Murray of Comic Book Resources ranked the Claws comic book series 5th in their "10 Greatest Black Cat Stories Ever" list, saying, "An unlikely duo teamed up in three-part miniseries, Claws. Wolverine and the Black Cat find themselves held captive in cages on a mysterious island, confronted by a group of hunters led by someone claiming to be Kraven the Hunter. If the pair make it to a boat waiting to take them to their rescue on the other side of the island, they can go free. However, they have to evade the huntsmen. An action-packed adventure ensues, with Wolverine and Black Cat working together effectively as they dodge bullets, rockets, and even killer robots. Their sharp back-and-forth and willingness to get their hands dirty made this series so popular, it spawned a sequel."

==== Claws II (2011) ====
According to Diamond Comic Distributors, Claws #1 was the 130th best selling comic book in July 2011.

Jesse Schedeen of IGN gave Wolverine & Black Cat: Claws #1 a grade of 6.5 out of 10, asserting, "Jimmy Palmiotti and Justin Gray offer up another rollicking adventure that's heavy on action and laughs and light on anything resembling substance. There's really no deep connection to exploit between the title heroes, so this story plays out like another take on the Wolverine/Domino dynamic from X-Force: Sex + Violence. It would have been nice to see the writers throw a new batch of villains into the mix rather than Arcade and White Rabbit. The humor also borders on being too silly and simplistic at times, such as the scene where a villain crashes into a hot dog cart and elicits a stereotypical New Yorker reaction from those around him. Again, the story is good, dumb fun, but too heavy on the dumb at times. In any case, the main appeal with either volume of Claws lies in seeing Joseph Linsner try his hand at Marvel's stable. For the most part, that's enough to sell the book. Linsner's work is sexy, playful, and dynamic - an all-around perfect fit for the script. Sure, his Wolverine is some bizarre amalgamation of hairless ape and furry were-beast, but at least he's back to being short and ugly. Lighthearted romps are all good and well. Where Claws II will find its greatest challenge is in competing with books like Astonishing Spider-Man & Wolverine. That series has proven a comic can offer simple, unfettered fun and still rank as one of the best of the year. Claws can't get by with coasting on the bare minimum."

==== Black Cat (2019) ====
===== Issue 1 =====
According to Diamond Comic Distributors, Black Cat #1 was the best selling comic book in June 2019, with over 250 000 sold units. Black Cat #1 was the 4th best selling comic book of 2019.

Sam Stone of Comic Book Resources compared Black Cat #1 to Ocean's 11 and The Thomas Crown Affair, writing, "Fun, true to the character, and action-packed, the inaugural issue of Black Cat is a top-down joy to read both for longtime fans of the character while being completely accessible to new readers. The creative team seamlessly mixes genres and explores the possibilities of the character without shying away from Felicia Hardy's recent villainous history. Reestablishing the character as a cool, confident burglar with her own checkered past, Black Cat #1 sets the stage for a heist-oriented adventure in the heart of the Marvel Universe for its eponymous protagonist." Charlie Ridgely of ComicBook.com called Black Cat #1 a "surprisingly enjoyable read", saying, "Black Cat #1 is a simple and grounded, but exciting series that gives an underutilized character the chance to shine on her own. It's not perfect, but it gets better as it goes along and is certainly well-worth your time, if you're looking for a new series to try out."

===== Issue 2 =====
According to Diamond Comic Distributors, Black Cat #2 was the 8th best selling comic book in July 2019. Black Cat #2 was the 89th best selling comic book in 2019. Charlie Ridgely of ComicBook.com gave Black Cat #2 a grade of 4 out of 5, asserting, "Color me surprised once again, but Black Cat is a good book. It's a caper-heist comic that continues to be better than you'd think it has any right to be, turning a supporting character like Felicia Hardy into an effortlessly compelling leading force. It's almost impossible not to be captured by her, as well as the characters around her. Everything at work in this book was already great, but adding in a crazed Merlin and a trip to the Sanctum Santorum make it even better. It's time to add this one to your pull list."

==== Black Cat (2020) ====
According to Diamond Comic Distributors, Black Cat #1 was the 29th best selling comic book in December 2020.

Sam Stone of Comic Book Resources described Black Cat #1 as a "solid relaunch", stating, "MacKay and Villa reunite to take springboard Black Cat's latest comic off the back of "King in Black", staying true to the spirit of the character and their previous series while managing to complement the bombastic crossover event. MacKay and Villa succeed in making this opening issue feel more like a tie-in to the crossover's story than several of the previous issues bearing the "King in Black" tie-in banner. Despite the new #1, Black Cat's relaunch keeps very much in line with what came before it while inviting new readers to jump on for a thrill ride as Felicia rises as the Marvel Universe's unlikely greatest savior." Tanner Dedmon of ComicBook.com called Black Cat #1 an "excellent jumping-on point", asserting, "Black Cat also has a surprisingly reserved presence in her own debut issue, but that's again owed to everything occurring around her. Seeing Black Cat slay symbiote dragons might have been memorable, but considering how other heroes have performed against similar threats, it never would've been believable. As such, Black Cat sometimes gets overshadowed during the more explosive moments of Black Cat #1. That type of action was never her game anyway—"above my pay grade", she says at one point in the issue—so her sacrifice of the spotlight was a necessary one to set her up for an opportunity to do what she does best. Like Captain America's confidence imbued in her, Black Cat's resolve is infectious, easily carrying whatever comes next in her new series."

==== Giant-Size Black Cat: Infinity Score (2021) ====
According to Diamond Comic Distributors, Giant-Size Black Cat: Infinity Score #1 was 24th best selling comic book in December 2021.

Dustin Holland of Comic Book Resources called Giant-Size Black Cat: Infinity Score #1 the "perfect ending for Black Cat and the Infinite Destinies Crossover," asserting, "Giant-Size Black Cat: Infinity Score #1 gives Felicia the heroic ending she deserves. The issue delivers a fun, action-packed story that addresses numerous characters and storylines without rushing anything. MacKay and Villa give Black Cat the opportunity to finish one of the most important jobs of her storied career. Felicia definitely still has some unfinished business, but this ending encapsulates the spirit of the Black Cat series perfectly." Adam Barnhardt of ComicBook.com gave Giant-Size Black Cat: Infinity Score #1 a grade of 4.5 out of 5, saying, "Jed MacKay's time with Black Cat has already been exceptional enough—then you factor in a stellar one-shot like Infinity Score, and it takes everything to a whole other level. Here, you have Felicia Hardy using half of the Infinity Stones for a relatively small purpose in the cosmic scheme of things—but it's an extremely personal and heartfelt reason as to why she does. And that's where MacKay often succeeds most: making these bombastic heroes as human as they can be. Hardy sets out to do her biggest score, regardless of the costs and she aces it, in more ways than one. As far as finales go, it's hard to imagine Infinity Score being a better endcap. For a street-level character that oftentimes aligns herself with the slimiest characters in the entire Marvel stable, Black Cat: Infinity Score #1 is packed to the brim with heart and a certain warmth that's perfect for the holiday season."

==== Mary Jane & Black Cat: Beyond (2022) ====
According to Diamond Comic Distributors, Mary Jane & Black Cat: Beyond #1 was the 21st best selling comic book in January 2022.

Sayantan Gayen of Comic Book Resources referred to Mary Jane & Black Cat: Beyond #1 as a "thrilling tale peppered with drama and intrigue," writing, "It is not an exaggeration to say that Mary Jane & Black Cat: Beyond #1 features one of the best Marvel crossovers in recent history. Jed MacKay writes an equally beautiful team-up of Black Cat and Ben Reilly in the Death of Doctor Strange: Spider-Man #1. Needless to say, MacKay has a good grasp on the character of Felicia Hardy and has found a seamless way to connect her with other characters across the Spider-Man mythos. Mary Jane and Black Cat may look at each other as romantic rivals, but the instant bonding between the two and the comfort they feel in each other's company is heartwarmingly beautiful to see. Mary Jane & Black Cat: Beyond #1 is an enthralling and charming tale." Hannibal Tabu of Bleeding Cool gave Mary Jane & Black Cat: Beyond #1 a grade of 8 out of 10, saying, "Jed MacKay has done some great work in building the legend of the Black Cat over the last few years, and this issue carries through the fruits of those labors in a Felicia Hardy that's quick to improvise but just as considerate and calculating."

==== Iron Cat (2022) ====
According to Diamond Comic Distributors, Iron Cat #1 was the 11th top advance-reordered comic book between May 23, 2022, and 29, 2022.

I-J Wheaton of Comic Book Resources called Iron Cat #1 a "neon-tinted team-up comic", saying, "Iron Cat #1 draws together many elements of the mythos that have been steadily building around Black Cat. It is very exciting to see a relative newcomer like Black Cat being pushed further into the mainstream with a team-up with a prominent Marvel character like Iron Man. With any luck, we'll see a whole new generation of readers checking out Black Cat and her previous solo comics. That being said, Iron Cat #1 is as much about the future as it is the past, and this first issue sets the stage for a thrilling adventure." Logan Moore of ComicBook.com gave Iron Cat #1 a grade of 4 out of 5, asserting, "Iron Cat gets off to a very fun start here in issue #1. In short, this series sees Black Cat and Iron Man coming together to go after a common enemy known as Iron Cat. This opening issue does a great job of quickly introducing all the major players in this story while also catching readers up on important aspects of previous Black Cat storylines. I'm curious to see what kind of legs Iron Cat has, but for now, I'm very excited to see how this series develops."

== Other versions ==
=== Age of Revelation ===
A possible future version of Black Cat appears in "Age of Revelation". This version was mutated into a cat-like form by the X-Virus, a mutagenic virus created by Revelation.

=== Earth-194 ===
An alternate universe version of Felicia Hardy from Earth-194 appears in End of the Spider-Verse. This version is a spider-powered heroine called Night-Spider whose abilities are derived from a Delvadian spider idol statue.

=== House of M ===
An alternate universe version of Felicia Hardy from Earth-58163 appears in House of M. This version is an assassin who works for the Kingpin before eventually becoming a double agent for the Avengers.

=== Marvel Adventures Spider-Man ===
An alternate universe version of Felicia Hardy from Earth-20051 appears in Marvel Adventures Spider-Man, romancing Peter before later joining the Blonde Phantom Detective Agency with Peter's new girlfriend Sophia "Chat" Sanduval.

=== Marvel Mangaverse ===
The Marvel Mangaverse incarnation of Black Cat as depicted in New Mangaverse #1(January 2006). Art by Tommy Ohtsuka.

An alternate universe version of Felicia Hardy from Earth-2301 appears in the Marvel Mangaverse continuity. This version is a cyborg who was transformed by the Kingpin, who implanted a failsafe mechanism to kill her if she attempted to leave him.

=== Marvel Noir ===
An alternate version of Felicia Hardy appears in the Marvel Noir continuity. This version is the primary love interest of Spider-Man Noir and the owner of "The Black Cat", a speakeasy that caters to the most powerful and corrupt in New York City, who later becomes the White Widow.

=== Marvel Zombies ===
A zombified alternate universe version of Felicia Hardy from Earth-2149 appears in Marvel Zombies. Unlike the main continuity version, this Felicia Hardy is depicted as an identical twin, with her sister Felicity Hardy having operated as the costumed adventurer Night Cat (in an identical costume of Felicia's) before the zombie apocalypse begun, surviving the apocalypse and joining Nick Fury's resistance.

=== MC2 ===
An alternate universe version of Felicia Hardy from Earth-2149 appears in MC2. This version is a detective who was formerly married to Flash Thompson, whose daughter Felicity Hardy (who suspects Spider-Man to be her real father, and in-turn Spider-Girl to be her half-sister) becomes the Scarlet Spider.

=== Next Avengers: Heroes of Tomorrow ===
An alternate universe version of Felicia Hardy appears in the continuation of the Next Avengers: Heroes of Tomorrow continuity featured in Brian Michael Bendis's and John Romita Jr.'s Avengers (vol. 4). This version is Spider-Man's primary love interest, and the mother of their daughter Felicity Hardy / Spider-Girl, who inherited her father's spider-powers and her mother's white hair (cut short), helping the Next Avengers survive Ultron's rule along with Iron Man and Maestro after her parents' deaths, across the split timelines Earth-10943 and Earth-10071.

=== Secret Wars (2015) ===
The Cat Lady, a funny animal-themed alternate universe version of Felicia Hardy from Earth-82081, appears in Secret Wars.

=== Spider-Gwen ===
An alternate version of Felicia Hardy from Earth-65 appears in Spider-Gwen. This version is a French musician.

=== Spider-Man: Fairy Tales ===
An alternate universe version of Felicia appears in Spider-Man: Fairy Tales. This version is a normal cat and Mary Jane Watson's pet.

=== Spider-Man Loves Mary Jane ===
An alternate universe version of Felicia Hardy appears in Spider-Man Loves Mary Jane.

=== Superman/Spider-Man ===
An alternate universe version of Felicia Hardy from a 1960s-era universe inhabited by the heroes of both the Marvel and DC Universes appears in Superman/Spider-Man. This version is dating Peter Parker at the same time as Mary Jane Watson, with the trio going out on a date together.

=== Supernaturals ===
An alternate universe version of Felicia Hardy appears in Supernaturals. This version is a member of a team led by Brother Voodoo with enchanted vocal abilities that allow her to alter the outcomes of events by speaking certain phrases aloud.

=== Ultimate Marvel ===
Ultimate Black Cat on the cover to Ultimate Spider-Man #152 (January 2011). Art by Jeff Scott Campbell.

An alternate universe version of Felicia Hardy from Earth-1610 appears in the Ultimate Marvel imprint. This version seeks revenge against Wilson Fisk / Kingpin for killing her father. Additionally, she has brown hair and wears a white wig as part of her costume.

=== Ultimate Universe ===
An alternate universe version of Felicia Hardy from Earth-6160 appears in Ultimate Spider-Man (vol. 3). This version is Felicia Hardy Jr., a teenager who possesses black wavy hair. After her father Walter Hardy / Black Cat is injured while fighting the Green Goblin and Spider-Man, he passes the mantle of Black Cat and his place in Wilson Fisk's Sinister Six to her. Felicia would later attempt to seek revenge on Spider-Man for her father, only to encounter and bond with Spider-Man's son Richard Parker, with whom she forms a romance.

=== What If? ===
Alternate timeline versions of Felicia Hardy appear in What If?:

- In "What if... The Alien Costume had Possessed Spider-Man?", Felicia discovers an alien symbiote that feeds on adrenaline permanently bonded to Spider-Man before killing him to bond with the Hulk. Amidst her efforts to kill him, she receives help from the Kingpin to develop a weapon capable of killing the symbiote in exchange for her working under him. After several heroes defeat the symbiote, Felicia kills it.
- In "What If... The Amazing Spider-Man Had Not Married Mary Jane?" and "What If... Spider-Man Married the Black Cat?", Peter Parker rekindles his relationship with Felicia after Mary Jane Watson is injured. However, the pair are unable to live together due to his desire to protect his secret identity. Felicia later inadvertently reveals his identity to an informant and becomes jealous of Parker's continued friendship with Mary Jane before Felicia is killed by Paladin.

== In other media ==
=== Television ===
- Felicia Hardy / Black Cat appears in the Spider-Man (1981) episode "Curiosity Killed the Spider-Man", voiced by Morgan Lofting.
- Felicia Hardy / Black Cat appears in Spider-Man: The Animated Series, voiced by Jennifer Hale. This version was Peter Parker's first love interest before he met Mary Jane Watson, leading to Felicia dating Michael Morbius and later Jason Phillips. Additionally, Felicia comes from a wealthy background as her mother is the head of the lucrative Hardy Foundation while her father, John Hardesky, was tricked by the Nazis into sneaking into an American lab during World War II to memorize the super-soldier formula that created Captain America and report back to the Red Skull. At the last moment, Hardesky realized the deception and ran away to a life of crime. In the present, he was held in a S.H.I.E.L.D. prison before the Kingpin breaks him out. On the Kingpin's behalf, Doctor Octopus kidnaps Felicia as leverage and to use her as a guinea pig for an improved super-soldier formula and introduce her to the father that she never knew. The formula proves a success, enhancing her overall physical prowess and granting her the ability to transform between her normal blonde form and her empowered white haired form at will. Using her new power, she recruits Spider-Man to help her rescue Hardesky and destroy the super-soldier formula. After Morbius turns himself into a vampiric entity, Felicia grapples with her feelings for him while trying to stop him. Along the way, she joins forces with him, Spider-Man, and Blade to stop the Vampire Queen from creating an army of vampires. Following this, Felicia leaves New York to work with Blade and Morbius, though she returns to help Spider-Man defeat Hydro-Man, attend Spider-Man and Watson's wedding, and help him and a group of superheroes combat a group of supervillains assembled by the Beyonder.
- A planned TV series based on the character was supposed to be made in 2001 by Marvel Studios and Tribune Entertainment, but never came to fruition.
- Felicia Hardy / Black Cat appears in The Spectacular Spider-Man, voiced by Tricia Helfer. This version does not have superpowers. She frequently flirts with Spider-Man until she tries and fails to break her father Walter Hardy out of prison, souring her relationship with Spider-Man.
- Felicia Hardy / Black Cat appears in Spider-Man (2017), voiced by Grey DeLisle.
- Sony canceled its planned female team-up film Silver & Black (see below) in August 2018 to rework it as two separate solo films focusing on each of the title characters — Felicia and Silver Sable. Silver & Black's planned director Gina Prince-Bythewood was expected to remain involved as a producer. By January 2020, the project was believed to be in development as a television series, which Prince-Bythewood confirmed in April 2020. She suggested that it could be a limited series, and had the potential to be released on Disney+.
- Felicia Hardy / Black Cat appears in Spidey and His Amazing Friends, voiced by Jaiden Klein. This version is significantly younger than other incarnations and is primarily obsessed with shiny objects. Additionally, she hates being called by her real name.
- Felicia Hardy / Black Cat appears in Lego Marvel Avengers: Strange Tails, voiced by Sammy Sullivan.
- The Marvel Noir incarnation of Felicia Hardy, renamed Cat Hardy, appears in Spider-Noir, portrayed by Li Jun Li. This version is a singer for the Alcove nightclub, which is owned by Silvermane. After Silvermane killed her first fiancé, Thomas, she falls in love with his enforcer, Flint Marko. When Marko's body begins turning to sand, she hires Ben Reilly aka the Spider to find him while attempting to get Silvermane killed. After Ben helps cover up her tracks and Marko leaves her to work for Silvermane, she begins a romance with Ben. The two plan to leave the city together, but after learning Dr. Faber could cure Marko's condition if she had Ben's blood, she reveals his secret to the doctor, resulting in Ben getting kidnapped and experimented on. Despite her betrayal, Ben helps her get the cure to Marko right after she kills Silvermane.

=== Film ===
- Felicia Hardy / Black Cat appeared in early scripts for Spider-Man 2 as part of a subplot in which she tries to convince Spider-Man to give up being Peter Parker. This idea was to contrast with the other subplot of Peter giving up being Spider-Man. Though she was removed in later scripts, the Black Cat and her subplot are used in the film's tie-in video game. Felicia Hardy was then supposed to appear in Sam Raimi's Spider-Man 4 as a secondary love interest of Parker's, though she would not have transformed into the Black Cat, as in the comics. Instead, Raimi's Felicia was expected to become a new super-powered figure called the Vulturess. In March 2013, Raimi stated that Anne Hathaway would have played Black Cat if Spider-Man 4 had been made.
- Felicia Hardy appears in The Amazing Spider-Man 2, portrayed by Felicity Jones. This version works for Oscorp as a secretary; after Harry Osborn takes control of the company, he promotes Felicia over members of Norman Osborn's former inner circle. The character was not conceived as a counterpart to any character from the comics, and is not even named Felicia in the film's script; Sony Pictures studio heads had her renamed to Felicia, with the intent of having her become the Black Cat in ultimately unmade sequels.
- In March 2017, it was officially reported that Sony Pictures was developing a Black Cat and Silver Sable-centered film with writer Christopher Yost, a project previously revealed following the Sony Pictures hack in 2014. It was intended to be a part of a shared universe called Sony's Spider-Man Universe, which is centered on characters from the Spider-Man mythology and began with the live-action film Venom in 2018. The films were to be more adult-oriented and despite taking place in the "same reality" as the Marvel Cinematic Universe, would not crossover with each other. In May 2017, it was announced that Gina Prince-Bythewood would direct the film, now titled Silver & Black. Production was supposed to begin in March 2018, but has since been delayed "indefinitely". Prince-Bythewood said the cause of the delay was script issues. While the film was initially scheduled to be released on February 8, 2019, Sony removed the release date from their schedule. Production was now slated to begin in 2019. In August 2018, Sony announced that Silver & Black was canceled in favor of having both characters starring in their own feature films. Black Cat was reportedly a re-worked version of the Silver & Black script while the studio were searching for screenwriters for Silver Sable. Prince-Bythewood would have served as a producer on both projects, before both were again cancelled by April 2020.

=== Video games ===
- Felicia Hardy / Black Cat appears as a playable character in Spider-Man: The Video Game.
- Felicia Hardy / Black Cat appears as an assist character in Spider-Man and Venom: Maximum Carnage.
- Felicia Hardy / Black Cat appears in Spider-Man (2000), voiced by Jennifer Hale.
- Felicia Hardy / Black Cat appears in Spider-Man 2 (2004), voiced by Holly Fields.
- Felicia Hardy / Black Cat appears as a playable character in Spider-Man: Friend or Foe, voiced by Audrey Wasilewski. She joins S.H.I.E.L.D. to help stop the P.H.A.N.T.O.M. invasion shortly before Spider-Man was sent to investigate the P.H.A.N.T.O.M.s' presence in Tokyo. There, Spider-Man encounters Black Cat trying to break into Doctor Octopus' lab and persuades her to join his team.
- Felicia Hardy / Black Cat appears as a boss and assist character in Spider-Man: Web of Shadows, voiced again by Tricia Helfer in the Microsoft, PlayStation, Wii, and Xbox versions and by Valerie Arem in the Nintendo DS version. After Spider-Man sees her leaving Fisk Tower, he assumes she is working for the Kingpin and gives chase. Following her defeat, Black Cat reveals that she is actually a double agent trying to thwart the Kingpin's illegal activities in an attempt to impress Spider-Man, for whom she still has feelings. The player is then presented with the choice of rejecting or returning her feelings. If the latter choice is made, Spider-Man will work with Black Cat against the Kingpin. Regardless of the choice made, Black Cat will become an ally. Later in the game, amidst a symbiote invasion, Black Cat is infected by one of the creatures and attacks Spider-Man, who defeats her with Mary Jane Watson's help. However, Black Cat is left grievously wounded, forcing Spider-Man to choose between leaving her in Watson's care or infecting her with another symbiote to heal her. If the latter choice is made, Black Cat will become Spider-Man's "queen" in one of the game's two black suit endings, in which he takes over the symbiote army.
  - In the PlayStation 2 and PlayStation Portable versions of the game, Black Cat is placed under mind control by Spencer Smythe before Spider-Man defeats her and is faced with the choice of either destroying the mind-control device to free her or allowing it to kill her so he can claim the device for himself.
- A Marvel 2099-inspired clone of Felicia Hardy / Black Cat appears as a boss in Spider-Man: Edge of Time, voiced by Katee Sackhoff. According to her in-game profile, Alchemax acquired the original Black Cat's DNA when she came to the company looking for a way to halt or reverse the aging process. Though she escaped after realizing the extent of Alchemax's corruption, they created clones of her as a security force. One clone in particular was given the Vanisher's teleportation powers, instilled with extreme agoraphobia so that she would not be tempted to escape their corporate headquarters, upgraded with cybernetic weaponry, given claws on her fingers, and led to believe they force-fed her anti-aging pills. After defeating several other Black Cat clones, Spider-Man encounters and fights the special clone. Following her defeat, Black Cat implies that she still has feelings for him before disappearing. Later, when Spider-Man 2099 sets off to confront Alchemax's CEO, he is forced to fight the remaining Black Cat clones along with other Alchemax guards.
- Felicia Hardy / Black Cat appears as a playable character in Marvel Super Hero Squad Online, voiced by Tara Strong.
- Felicia Hardy / Black Cat appears as a playable character in Marvel: Avengers Alliance.
- Felicia Hardy / Black Cat appears as a boss in The Amazing Spider-Man film tie-in game, voiced by Ali Hillis. This version is initially a patient at Beloit Psychiatric Hospital who escapes after Spider-Man's attempt to break out Curt Connors accidentally releases the other patients. Following this, Felicia forms a small gang of hired thugs, mercenaries, and urban commandos to rob St. Gabriel's Bank. When Spider-Man arrives to foil the heist, he fights and defeats Felicia in the bank's underground levels before handing her over to the police. In a side mission, it is revealed that Felicia escaped once again, taken on the Black Cat persona, and mysteriously gained superpowers.
- Felicia Hardy / Black Cat appears in LittleBigPlanet via the "Marvel Costume Kit 6" DLC.
- Felicia Hardy / Black Cat appears in Marvel Heroes.
- Felicia Hardy / Black Cat appears as a playable character in Lego Marvel Super Heroes, voiced by Laura Bailey.
- Felicia Hardy / Black Cat appears as a boss in The Amazing Spider-Man 2 film tie-in game, voiced again by Ali Hillis. It is revealed that the Kingpin broke Felicia out of prison, gave her super-powers through Ravencroft's illegal cross-species experiments, and ordered her to kill Spider-Man. Adopting the Black Cat alias, she makes two attempts on Spider-Man's life and is defeated in the second, whereupon she reveals the Kingpin's identity as Wilson Fisk to Spider-Man and what he did to her. She also claims she never wanted to hurt Spider-Man and that she willingly took part in the experiment so that she could be like him and be with him. After Spider-Man rejects her advances and offers to protect her from the Kingpin, Black Cat refuses and escapes. In the mobile version of the game, Black Cat is a supporting character and ally who informs Spider-Man of various crimes taking place around the city and helps him fight enemies in several missions.
- Felicia Hardy / Black Cat appears in Disney Infinity 2.0, voiced again by Tara Strong.
- Felicia Hardy / Black Cat appears as a playable character in Spider-Man Unlimited, voiced once again by Tara Strong.
- Felicia Hardy / Black Cat appears as a playable character in Marvel: Future Fight.
- Felicia Hardy / Black Cat appears as a playable character in Marvel Avengers Academy, voiced by Mel Gorsha.
- Felicia Hardy / Black Cat appears as a playable character in Marvel Puzzle Quest.
- Felicia Hardy / Black Cat appears in Spider-Man (2018) and its DLC The City That Never Sleeps, voiced by Erica Lindbeck. This version is the successor to her father and previous Black Cat, Walter Hardy, and was previously in a relationship with Spider-Man years prior. In the base game, she sets up various cat dolls around the city for Spider-Man to collect while claiming she wants to go straight. When Spider-Man collects them all, she activates them at the police station to retrieve her equipment. In the DLC, she deceives Peter into believing he had a illegitimate son with her to help her steal a hard drive from the Maggia. After faking her death, she returns in the climax to save Spider-Man from a cybernetic Hammerhead.
- Felicia Hardy / Black Cat appears in Marvel Snap.
- Felicia Hardy / Black Cat appears in Spider-Man 2 (2023), voiced again by Erica Lindbeck. In the sequel, she steals the Wand of Watoomb from the Sanctum Sanctorum to escape Kraven the Hunter and return to her girlfriend in Paris. With the help of the newer Spider-Man, Miles Morales, she succeeds.
- Felicia Hardy / Black Cat appears as a purchasable cosmetic outfit in Fortnite.
- Black Cat appears as a playable character in Marvel Rivals.

=== Merchandise ===
- In 2018, Diamond Select Toys released a Felicia Hardy / Black Cat figurine.
- In 2022, Hasbro released a Felicia Hardy / Black Cat action figure as part of the Marvel Legends action figure line.

=== Miscellaneous ===
- Felicia Hardy / Black Cat appears in Spider-Man: The Darkest Hours, by Jim Butcher.
- Felicia Hardy / Black Cat appears in the novel Spider-Man and The Incredible Hulk: Rampage, by Danny Fingeroth and Eric Fein.
- Felicia Hardy / Black Cat appears in Marvel Universe Live! as a member of the Sinister Six.

== Collected editions ==
Title	Material collected	Published date	ISBN
Spider-Man vs. Black Cat	Amazing Spider-Man #194–195, 204–205, 226–227	November 2015	978-0785115595
Marvel Divas	Marvel Divas #1–4	January 2010	978-0785131779
Wolverine & Black Cat: Claws	Wolverine & Black Cat: Claws #1–3	February 2010	978-0785142850
Wolverine & Black Cat: Claws II	Wolverine & Black Cat: Claws II #1–3 and Killraven #1	May 2012	978-0785151869
Spider-Man/Black Cat: The Evil That Men Do	Spider-Man/Black Cat: The Evil That Men Do #1–6	May 2007	978-0785110798
Spider-Man: Black Cat	Amazing Spider-Man Presents: Black Cat #1–4, and material from The Many Loves of the Amazing Spider-Man and Amazing Spider-Man #612	January 2011	978-0785143185
Marvel's Spider-Man: The Black Cat Strikes	Marvel's Spider-Man: The Black Cat Strikes #1–5	September 2020	978-1302919252
Black Cat Vol. 1: Grand Theft Marvel	Black Cat (vol. 1) #1–5	March 2020	978-1846533914
Black Cat Vol. 2: On The Run	Black Cat (vol. 1) #6–10	September 2020	978-1302919214
Black Cat Vol. 3: All Dressed Up	Black Cat (vol. 1) #11–12, Black Cat Annual (vol. 1) #1, material from Free Comic Book Day 2020 (Spider-Man/Venom) #1 (Spider-Man story)	February 2021	978-1302922924
Black Cat Vol. 4: Queen in Black	Black Cat (vol. 2) #1–4 and material from X-Men: To Serve and Protect #4	June 2021	978-1302927585
Black Cat Vol. 5: I'll Take Manhattan	Black Cat (vol. 2) #5–7, Black Cat Annual (vol. 2) #1	September 2021	978-1302927899
Black Cat Vol. 6: Infinity Score	Black Cat (vol. 2) #8–10, Giant-Size Black Cat: Infinity Score #1	January 2022	978-1302931384
Amazing Spider-Man: Beyond Vol. 3	Mary Jane & Black Cat: Beyond #1 and Amazing Spider-Man (vol. 5) #86–88, 88.BEY	April 2022	978-1302932589
Mary Jane & Black Cat: Dark Web	Mary Jane & Black Cat #1–5	July 2023	978-1302947996
Iron Cat	Iron Cat #1–5	January 2023	978-1302946975
Black Cat by Jed Mackay Omnibus	Black Cat (vol. 1) #1–12, Annual (vol. 1) #1, Black Cat (vol. 2) #1–10, Annual (vol. 2) #1, Iron Cat #1–5, Giant-Size Black Cat: Infinity Score #1 and material from Free Comic Book Day 2020 (Spider-Man/Venom)	May 2023	978-1302952013
Jackpot & Black Cat	Jackpot #1 and Jackpot & Black Cat #1–4	November 2024	978-1302957544
