= Silver & Black (unproduced film) =

Unproduced superhero film by Gina Prince-Bythewood

Silver & Black is an unproduced American superhero film based on the Marvel Comics characters Silver Sable and Black Cat. It was to be produced by Columbia Pictures in association with Marvel and distributed by Sony Pictures Releasing. The film was intended to be an installment of Sony's Spider-Man Universe (SSU), with Gina Prince-Bythewood directing from a screenplay she co-wrote with Lisa Joy, Chris Yost, and the writing team of Lindsey Beer and Geneva Robertson-Dworet.

Black Cat was first to be included in a film with the unproduced Spider-Man 4, before being introduced in The Amazing Spider-Man 2 (2014). Development of a female superhero spin-off from the Spider-Man film franchise first began in October 2014; by March 2017, it was set to feature Black Cat and Silver Sable, with Yost writing. Prince-Bythewood joined in May, with filming set to take place in Atlanta, Georgia and Mexico. Pre-production work began, with Prince-Bythewood intending to cast a black actress in one of the title roles. However, the director was unhappy with the film's script which led to an indefinite delay in production while she and Sony re-developed the project.

In July 2018, Prince-Bythewood chose to direct a different comic book adaptation, The Old Guard, and a month later Sony canceled Silver & Black. The studio began development of two new solo films, focusing on each of the title characters, with Prince-Bythewood expected to remain as a producer on both projects. By January 2020, Sony was instead developing the project as a television series. That July, Prince-Bythewood expressed interest in returning to the project following the release of The Old Guard.

== Background ==
In December 2009, the Marvel Comics character Felicia Hardy was set to be introduced in Spider-Man 4, with Anne Hathaway being looked at to play the role. Julia Stiles, Rachel McAdams, and Romola Garai were also considered. Director Sam Raimi had differences with the producers regarding taking the character in a different direction from the comics in which she becomes the cat burglar known as Black Cat. While Raimi intended for the character to still utilise the Black Cat moniker, the studio reportedly desired to have her become a supervillain named "Vulturess", to partner with John Malkovich as the Vulture. The next month, Sony announced that the Spider-Man franchise would be rebooted after Raimi decided to no longer pursue direct sequels to Spider-Man 3 (2007). In January 2013, Felicity Jones was in talks to join the second film in the reboot series, The Amazing Spider-Man 2 (2014), as Hardy. The character does not take on the Black Cat persona in the film.

In December 2013, Sony revealed plans to use The Amazing Spider-Man 2 to establish their own expanded universe based on the Marvel properties the studio had the film rights to. Avi Arad and Matt Tolmach would produce the films as part of a franchise brain trust that also included Alex Kurtzman, Roberto Orci, Jeff Pinkner, Ed Solomon, and Drew Goddard, as well as The Amazing Spider-Man (2012) and The Amazing Spider-Man 2 director Marc Webb. However, after The Amazing Spider-Man 2 underperformed and with Sony "under tremendous pressure to perform [that had them taking] a hard look at their most important franchise", the direction of the new shared universe was rethought. Development of a female superhero spin-off film set in the expanded universe had begun, with Lisa Joy writing the screenplay and a 2017 release eyed. Potential characters to be featured in the film included Hardy, Silver Sable, Stunner, Firestar, and Spider-Woman. By October 2014, the planned film was known by the working title Glass Ceiling, and was set to be a team-up film featuring more than one of the female superhero characters connected to the Spider-Man comics. In January 2015, Jones expressed interest in reprising her role of Hardy and exploring the Black Cat side of the character, but stated that there were no plans for her to do so. The next month, Sony and Marvel Studios announced a new partnership that would see the latter produce the next Spider-Man film for Sony, and integrate the character into their Marvel Cinematic Universe. Sony still planned to produce the spin-off films, including the female superhero film, but would do so without Marvel's involvement. Despite this, the spin-off films were canceled by November 2015.

== Development ==
When Sony revived a Spider-Man spin-off featuring the character Venom in March 2017, the company was also believed to be "fast at work" on a female superhero spin-off as well, with Chris Yost rewriting Joy's script. Tolmach and Amy Pascal were set to produce the film, which would feature both Silver Sable and Black Cat. It would be set in Sony's own shared universe, Sony's Spider-Man Universe, and would not crossover with the Marvel Studios film Spider-Man: Homecoming (2017).

It's so up my alley in terms of these two female characters and who they are and what they're about. It's the perfect way for me to dive into the Marvel universe, to focus on these two women who I really respect and can't wait to bring to life.

— Gina Prince-Bythewood on joining Silver & Black

Gina Prince-Bythewood signed on to direct in May 2017, and it was officially titled Silver & Black. Emily Carmichael was also considered to direct the film. A fan of big-budget genre films, Prince-Bythewood had been planning to take on such a film, despite suggestions that female directors were not interested in working on such projects. She was already focused on a different project at the time, but when she was shown the script for Silver & Black by Sony she immediately "saw the movie in [her] head" and chose to pursue this film instead. Prince-Bythewood was able to be specific about her vision for the project in meetings with the studio, saying, "It was exciting in those meetings because everything I was talking about, they loved." Filming for Silver & Black was expected to begin in late 2017.

== Pre-production ==
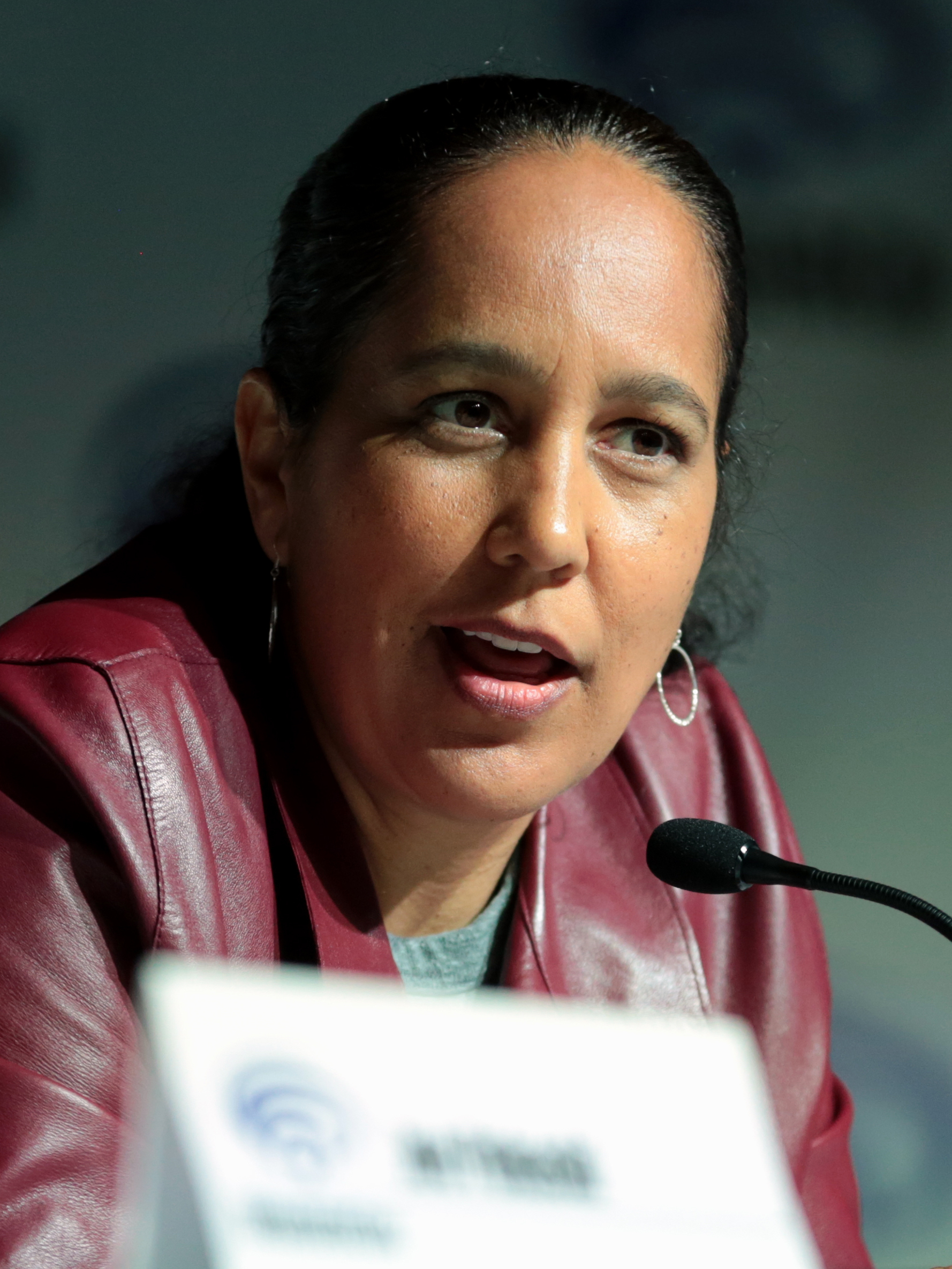
Gina Prince-Bythewood was attached to direct the film and contribute to the screenplay in May 2017.

In June 2017, Pascal said that Sony now intended to have their new Marvel-based films take place in "the same world" as Spider-Man: Homecoming, describing them as "adjunct" to that world. She said that Silver & Black would have connections with Venom, and that there was potential for Tom Holland's Spider-Man to appear in both films. By that point, Prince-Bythewood was writing a new draft of the script herself, and had begun planning the visuals and music for the film, which she hoped to begin casting for shortly. Prince-Bythewood was inspired by Patty Jenkins' superhero film Wonder Woman (2017), which had been released soon after she had signed on to direct Silver & Black. Prince-Bythewood met with Jenkins several times to discuss Wonder Woman, and to get advice on directing a big-budget female superhero film.

In July, Columbia Pictures president Sanford Panitch explained that Sony was not interested in producing "conventional comic-book movies" and was looking to give each film in their MU a distinct style. Silver & Black was considered a dark buddy film, compared to Thelma & Louise (1991) and Midnight Run (1988). Prince-Bythewood wanted to explore "the story of two damaged women who are at war with each other but need each other to survive", and noted that both characters are haunted by the deaths of their parents in the comics. The film was officially set for release on February 8, 2019, with the villains Chameleon, Tombstone, and Tarantula being considered. In December, Ruth E. Carter joined as costume designer after doing so for Marvel's Black Panther (2018), and Kristi Zea signed on as production designer in January 2018.

Also in January 2018, production on the film was expected to begin on March 5, 2018, and run through mid-June. Filming was set to primarily take place in Atlanta, Georgia, under the working title Tri-Border. Additional filming was set to take place in Mexico, which was believed to be for scenes depicting the Triple Frontier area bordering Brazil, Argentina, and Paraguay. Lindsey Beer and Geneva Robertson-Dworet had written a new draft of the screenplay by mid-February 2018, which they had handed back to Prince-Bythewood to polish. At that point, Prince-Bythewood had developed looks for the film's sets and costumes, scouted locations, storyboarded action sequences, and begun working with the visual effects team.

== Indefinite delay ==
Plans to begin filming were delayed indefinitely at the end of February because Prince-Bythewood was not yet happy with the script. Additional pre-production work, such as costume design, was also delayed until re-writes were completed, with Carter explaining that she was "waiting to get the signal" that she could continue work on the film. In May, Prince-Bythewood said she was "really looking to do something different within the [superhero] genre", wanting to elevate the two characters from the comics and "put them out in the world." She added that though both characters are white in the comics, she intended to play with this by casting a black actress in one of the lead roles, wanting to "get a good black female up on screen in that genre". By the end of the month, Prince-Bythewood was still working on the script, explaining that "it all starts with the script. You gotta have a great script so we want to make sure that's right before we jump in." Shortly after, at the start of June, Sony removed the film from its February 2019 release date and began actively looking for a new date to release the film which could accommodate the new re-writes and delayed production start.

Discussing her role as director of the pilot episode for Marvel's Cloak & Dagger series, Prince-Bythewood said in June 2018 that she was excited to have entered the Marvel world and learned by doing "such cool, innovative things" with Marvel Television which she could then apply to the "bigger sandbox" of the films. She reiterated her commitment to "telling a good story" which is why she decided to delay filming until she was happy with the script. The director added that she may begin production on a different project before filming Silver & Black if the script is still not ready; a month later, she signed on to direct another comic book adaptation, The Old Guard, which was set to begin filming by the end of 2018. After placing her work for Silver & Black on hold, Prince-Bythewood ultimately took two years to develop and complete The Old Guard. The director later attributed her success with The Old Guard to her work on Silver & Black, believing that she only got the chance to direct the former because of the time she spent on the latter, and adding that she learned a lot of lessons about making a big budget film while developing Silver & Black which she was able to apply to the making of The Old Guard.

== Cancellation and future ==
In August 2018, Sony officially canceled Silver & Black, with the intention to instead rework the project as two separate solo films focusing on each of the title characters. An official decision had not been made at the time, but Prince-Bythewood was not expected to direct either of the new films. A month later, Tolmach was asked about the progress of the Silver & Black project and did not acknowledge the decision by Sony to cancel and rework the film, simply saying that they were "still working on the script". A solo film focused on Black Cat was expected first, as Sony believed she was "enough of her own character with a great backstory and a canon of material to draw from to justify her own film." That would be followed by a Silver Sable film. Prince-Bythewood would remain involved as a producer, and Sony was adamant that she would be replaced with another female director.

Sony Pictures Entertainment chairman Tony Vinciquerra revealed in March 2019 that the Sony's Spider-Man Universe would be expanding to television with a set of Marvel characters developed specifically by Sony Pictures Television, and a network partner yet-to-be-determined. By January 2020, one of these series was believed to be a version of Silver & Black. Prince-Bythewood confirmed this in April 2020, explaining that first the two characters were going to be in a film together before a decision was made by Sony to split the two characters into their own films, and then another decision had been made to tell their story with a potential limited series which she suggested could be released on Disney+. Prince-Bythewood stated that her preference would be to include both characters in a single feature film, and she still hoped to be able to make that film one day.

Prince-Bythewood stated in July 2020 that she would return to discussions with Sony about Silver & Black following the release of The Old Guard that month. She added that she wanted the film to be "edgier" than other Marvel films, saying, "It was a question of how far could I push it in that Marvel universe." She also felt that they had devised an organic reason for having Black Cat and Silver Sable together in a film during her work on the script, and she wanted to keep the two characters together. Discussing the impact of the successful Spider-Man films on the project, Prince-Bythewood said, "There's a question of, 'Can you really have these films with Spider-Man not in them?'"

== See also ==
- Gambit (unproduced film), an unproduced film based on the Marvel character of the same name
- Blade (unproduced film), an unproduced film based on the Marvel character of the same name
- List of unproduced Marvel Comics projects
- List of unproduced films based on Marvel Imprints
