= List of Spider-Man: The Animated Series episodes =

Spider-Man: The Animated Series, also known as Spider-Man, is an American animated television series based on the Marvel Comics superhero of the same name. The show ran on the Fox Kids Network for five seasons, consisting of 65 episodes, from November 19, 1994, to January 31, 1998. The series also aired in syndication on Fox Family Channel, Toon Disney and ABC Family. It is currently available on Disney+.

== Series overview ==
Season	Story arc	Episodes		Originally released	
Season	Story arc	Episodes		First released	Last released
1	—	13		November 19, 1994	June 11, 1995
2	Neogenic Nightmare	14		September 9, 1995	February 24, 1996
3	The Sins of the Fathers	14		April 27, 1996	November 23, 1996
4	Partners In Danger	11		February 1, 1997	August 2, 1997
5	The Wedding	13	1	September 12, 1997	
5	Six Forgotten Warriors	13	5	September 19, 1997	October 17, 1997
5	The Return of Hydro-Man	13	2	October 24, 1997	October 31, 1997
5	Secret Wars	13	3	November 7, 1997	November 21, 1997
5	Spider Wars	13	2	January 31, 1998	

== Episodes ==
=== Season 1 (1994–95) ===
No. overall	No. in season	Title	Directed by	Written by	Original release date
1	1	"Night of the Lizard"	Bob Richardson	Gerry Conway, Stan Berkowitz & John Semper	November 19, 1994
Peter Parker, who fights crime as the masked superhero Spider-Man, discovers that his science teacher, Curt Connors, has been turned into a lizard-like mutant due to an experiment gone wrong, and is abducting people throughout Manhattan. As J. Jonah Jameson wants a picture of the lizard, Peter competes with rival reporter Eddie Brock to obtain it.
2	2	"The Spider Slayer"	Bob Richardson	Story by : John Semper; Teleplay by : Stan Berkowitz	February 4, 1995
Norman Osborn hires Spencer Smythe to capture Spider-Man in exchange for building a hoverchair for his son Alistair. Spencer creates his deadliest weapon, the Spider-Slayer, to accomplish this. Brock works with Norman and Spencer to unmask Spider-Man. When it all fails and Spencer is supposedly dead in the scene, Brock is fired by Jameson and Felicia Hardy scolds both Flash Thompson and Peter for their actions as Peter's aunt May plans to introduce him to Anna Watson's niece. In the final scene, Alistair is approached by Wilson Fisk, also known as Kingpin.
3	3	"Return of the Spider Slayers"	Bob Richardson	Story by : John Semper; Teleplay by : Mark Hoffmeier	February 11, 1995
Kingpin offers to provide Alistair with the funds he requires to build more of Spencer's Spider-Slayer robots, claiming that Spider-Man is responsible for the death of his father. Alistair fails in his bid to kill Spider-Man, Jameson, Flash, Brock, and Norman, whom he holds responsible for his father's death. As a consequence, Kingpin makes him work for him until he does kill Spider-Man. Peter finally meets Anna's niece Mary Jane Watson.
4	4	"Doctor Octopus: Armed and Dangerous"	Bob Richardson	Story by : Avi Arad; Stan Lee; Teleplay by : Brooks Wachtel & Cynthia Harrison	February 18, 1995
When Peter arrives for a date with Felicia, she is kidnapped by the corrupt scientist Doctor Octopus to force her mother Anastasia to provide him with the money she promised to fund his experiments. Complicating things, Peter recognizes the threat as Otto Octavius, who was once his science teacher.
5	5	"The Menace of Mysterio"	Bob Richardson	Marv Wolfman; Stan Berkowitz and John Semper	February 25, 1995
Jameson and many others believe that Spider-Man is responsible for robberies that have been happening recently. Peter thus decides to search for clues to prove that these robberies were caused by a Spider-Man impostor. He teams up with detective Terry Lee and confronts Mysterio, a self-proclaimed master of the mystic arts who is posing as a superhero.
6	6	"The Sting of the Scorpion"	Bob Richardson	Story by : John Semper; Teleplay by : Robert Skir & Marty Isenberg and John Semper	March 11, 1995
Mac Gargan, a small-time crook hired by Jameson to follow Peter and find out how he is able to get pictures of Spider-Man, strikes a deal with Jameson to eliminate Spider-Man. Gargan is taken to the lab of Farley Stillwell where he is transformed into the supervillain Scorpion.
7	7	"Kraven the Hunter"	Bob Richardson	Story by : John Semper and Jan Strnad; Teleplay by : Mark Hoffmeier	April 1, 1995
As Peter goes to an interview with scientist Mariah Crawford, she is under attack by the villain Kraven the Hunter. After Spider-Man is able to elude him, Crawford explains that she and Kraven used to be in love but when he was seriously injured by lions, she had no choice but to give him a wonder drug called the Calypso Serum, which she got from a former associate of hers. The serum can heal all wounds but made Kraven into a hunting crazed superhuman. When Robbie Robertson is kidnapped, Spider-Man and Crawford must rescue him and administer the antidote to Kraven.
8	8	"The Alien Costume, Part 1"	Bob Richardson	Story by : Avi Arad and Stan Lee; Teleplay by : Len Wein, Meg McLaughlin, Stan Berkowitz and John Semper	April 29, 1995
Astronauts John Jameson and Paul Stevens are sent to a newly discovered asteroid and discover a rock, known as "Promethium X", which is said to be more powerful than plutonium. Unbeknown to them, however, the Promethium X also contains a black, ooze-like creature, which manages to break free and tries to consume the two astronauts. The space shuttle crashes on the George Washington Bridge where the Rhino is sent by Kingpin to steal the Promethium X. Spider-Man manages to save John and Stevens, yet unbeknown to Spider-Man, Brock is also on the bridge and takes photos of him and Rhino as well. Brock uses propaganda and frames Spider-Man for stealing something from the shuttle, which leads to a $1 million bounty on Spider-Man's head by John's father, J. Jonah Jameson, who rehires Brock. However, Brock fails to mention having seen Rhino at the scene also. Meanwhile, the black fluid hitches a ride on Spider-Man's costume and forms over him while he sleeps. Spider-Man then finds himself with a black suit hanging upside down in the middle of the city with no memory of how he got there.
9	9	"The Alien Costume, Part 2"	Bob Richardson	Story by : John Semper and Brynne Stephens; Teleplay by : Brynne Stephens	May 6, 1995
Peter, with his powers enhanced by his new suit, focuses his attention on Brock and Jameson and warns the latter to call off his reward, also mentioning Rhino and how Brock neglected to mention him. Jameson finds out from John of Brock's lies. Livid, Jameson fires him and calls off the manhunt for Spider-Man. Noticing that he is becoming more hostile and aggressive, Peter seeks the assistance of Connors, who studies the suit and realizes that it is a symbiote. Peter then uses the symbiote's powers to find a clue in Brock's apartment, only to run into the Shocker, sent by Alistair to destroy the evidence Brock has of the crash site. Following Shocker leads Peter to Alistair and the Promethium X, which he steals. Kingpin and Shocker form a plan to kidnap Jameson in an attempt to gain the Promethium X back. The effects of the symbiote lead to Peter literally fighting it to get it off him.
10	10	"The Alien Costume, Part 3"	Bob Richardson	Story by : John Semper and Mark Hoffmeier; Teleplay by : Mark Hoffmeier	May 13, 1995
Returned to his old costume, Spider-Man soon comes across the Rhino and the Shocker, who manage to get the upper hand on him. However, an unknown "ally" arrives and defeats the two supervillains himself. The new "ally" is Brock, now known as Venom, who has bound to the discarded symbiote and wants revenge on Spider-Man.
11	11	"The Hobgoblin, Part 1"	Bob Richardson	Story by : John Semper; Teleplay by : Larry Brody	May 20, 1995
Norman hires the Hobgoblin to assassinate Kingpin because of the crime lord's continuous threats against him. During a public unveiling, Peter saves Kingpin just as the Hobgoblin attempts an attack on him. After eluding Spider-Man, the Hobgoblin is fired by Norman as of his unsuccessful assassination of Kingpin and begins to work for Kingpin in his revenge on Norman.
12	12	"The Hobgoblin, Part 2"	Bob Richardson	Stan Berkowitz	May 27, 1995
The Hobgoblin double-crosses Kingpin and declares himself the city's new top crime lord. Kingpin then asks Norman to assist him in reclaiming his position, but the Hobgoblin kidnaps Norman's son Harry in response, forcing Spider-Man to step in and face the villain again.
13	13	"Day of the Chameleon"	Bob Richardson	John Semper	June 11, 1995
Chameleon, an international spy, attempts assassination on two diplomats to derail the signing of a peace proposal. S.H.I.E.L.D. director Nick Fury enlists Jameson's help to prevent the Chameleon's crime while Spider-Man begins his own hunt against the assassin.

=== Season 2: Neogenic Nightmare (1995–96) ===
Each individual title had the "Neogenic Nightmare" chapter prefix to it.

No. overall	No. in season	Title	Directed by	Written by	Original release date
Neogenic Nightmare
14	1	"Chapter I: The Insidious Six"	Bob Richardson	Story by : John Semper; Teleplay by : John Semper and David Lee Miller	September 9, 1995
With Alistair causing a jailbreak, Kingpin hires the Rhino, the Shocker, Doctor Octopus, Mysterio, the Scorpion, and the Chameleon to take down Spider-Man as the Insidious Six as Kingpin deals with Silvermane planning to lead Hammerhead, Owl, and other crime lords against him. Meanwhile, Peter has been experiencing brief periods of time where his powers temporarily vanish.
15	2	"Chapter II: Battle of the Insidious Six"	Bob Richardson	Story by : John Semper; Teleplay by : Doug Booth	September 16, 1995
Spider-Man walks into the trap of the Insidious Six at a warehouse. Spider-Man attempts to battle the six, but is captured and unmasked, although he manages to convince the six supervillains that he is a fraud as Doctor Octopus notes that he didn't have the fighting skills like last time. Displeased with seeing the outcome after the crime lords have been patient long enough, Silvermane starts to have Hammerhead begin the plans on the war on Kingpin causing the latter to have his Insidous Six go on the offensive against Silvermane. After the Insidious Six are defeated and Silvermane is rescued, Connors reveals that Spider-Man has begun to mutate further, which is the cause of his powers briefly vanishing.
16	3	"Chapter III: Hydro-Man"	Bob Richardson	Story by : John Semper; Teleplay by : Jim Krieg	September 23, 1995
While dealing with the stunning revelation of his condition, Spider-Man finds himself dealing with the rash of mysterious robberies happening across town. As Peter, he tries to get closer to Mary Jane and discovers that she is being stalked by her evil ex-boyfriend who reveals himself to be the super-thief Hydro-Man, who is obsessed with winning her back.
17	4	"Chapter IV: The Mutant Agenda"	Bob Richardson	Story by : John Semper and J. M. DeMatteis; Teleplay by : Michael Edens	September 30, 1995
Spider-Man begins to worry about his growing mutation. In order to seek a cure, he heads to the Xavier mansion where he encounters the X-Men. A brief fight occurs, but Spider-Man explains his plight to Charles Xavier, who tells Spider-Man that he cannot cure him. Beast tells Spider-Man to go to Dr. Herbert Landon, who is working on a cure for mutants. Afterward, Landon's henchmen capture Beast, leaving Spider-Man terrified. While Spider-Man is watching Landon's demonstration, the facility is attacked by the Hobgoblin. However, a mysterious telekinetic force holds the ceiling in place long enough for Spider-Man to escape. Wolverine begins to worry about Beast's disappearance. He discovers that Beast spoke with Spider-Man before he disappeared and sets out to find Spider-Man.: Note: The events of this episode take place during the fourth season of X-Men: The Animated Series.
18	5	"Chapter V: Mutants' Revenge"	Bob Richardson	Story by : John Semper and Michael Edens; Teleplay by : Francis Moss and Ted Pedersen	October 7, 1995
Wolverine catches up with Spider-Man, who is hot on the trail of the missing Beast. Meanwhile, the Hobgoblin steals the mutant technology information that the villainous Herbert Landon had prepared for Kingpin. Meanwhile, Landon's assistant Genevieve struggles with keeping her secret of being a telekinetic mutant, who saved Spider-Man from the collapsing ceiling. This is revealed after the Hobgoblin causes an accident that transforms Landon into a lizard-like mutant.: Note: The events of this episode take place during the fourth season of X-Men: The Animated Series.
19	6	"Chapter VI: Morbius"	Bob Richardson	Story by : John Semper; Teleplay by : Brynne Stephens and Lydia Marano	October 28, 1995
Crawford has developed a cure for Spider-Man's disease, but she is reluctant to give an untested serum to him because it may result in permanent loss of his powers or worse. After an angry outburst from Spider-Man, she hands it over. At the ESU lab, Peter is secretly observed by Felicia's latest love interest, Michael Morbius, who then swipes the infected blood sample after Peter leaves for the night. An accident turns him into a vampire. An increasingly desperate Spider-Man drinks the serum designed to cure him, but it makes him grow four extra arms.
20	7	"Chapter VII: Enter the Punisher"	Bob Richardson	Story by : John Semper and Carl Potts; Teleplay by : Carl Potts	November 4, 1995
The antihero Punisher thinks Spider-Man is a crook and chases him around. Spider-Man finds out that Morbius has turned into a vampire and is draining people's plasma to survive. Spider-Man wants to help Morbius, but Punisher is trying to get rid of Spider-Man at the same time. However, the next part of Spider-Man's mutation is about to happen.
21	8	"Chapter VIII: Duel of the Hunters (Note: This episode originally aired in primetime.)"	Bob Richardson	John Semper	November 11, 1995
Spider-Man's mutation reaches its culmination as he transforms into the monstrous Man-Spider as Jameson learns from Robertson about Punisher's background. Crawford, unaware of the monstrous transformation, summons Kraven to help her track down Spider-Man and cure him of his mutation with a newly developed antidote. Kraven rescues Punisher as they work together to subdue Spider-Man's Man-Spider form.
22	9	"Chapter IX: Blade, the Vampire Hunter"	Bob Richardson	Stephanie Mathison, Mark Hoffmeier, and John Semper	February 3, 1996
The vampire hunter Blade arrives in New York City to destroy Morbius, but Spider-Man wants to revert Morbius back to his human form.
23	10	"Chapter X: The Immortal Vampire"	Bob Richardson	John Semper and Meg McLaughlin	February 10, 1996
Spider-Man and Blade put aside their differences in an attempt to prevent Morbius from using the Neogenic Recombinator to transform everyone into vampire-like creatures like himself. They team up with Lee, who falls for Blade. During one attempt to stop the supervillain, he kidnaps May and Felicia, causing Spider-Man and Blade to have a brief falling out of the scene.
24	11	"Chapter XI: Tablet of Time"	Bob Richardson	Mark Hoffmeier, Stan Berkowitz, and John Semper	November 18, 1995
An ancient artifact known as the Tablet of Time has been uncovered. Kingpin wants to sell it, while an elderly and frail Silvermane wants to use it to restore his youth. After getting fired for failing Silvermane, Hammerhead sides with Kingpin. Silvermane dispatches Tombstone to abduct Kingpin's wife Vanessa Fisk. Spider-Man deals with the Lizard again as Tombstone is sent to abduct Connors.
25	12	"Chapter XII: Ravages of Time"	Bob Richardson	Mark Hoffmeier, Stan Berkowitz and John Semper	November 25, 1995
Tombstone has defeated Spider-Man and made off with Dr. Connors. Silvermane and Kingpin have an exchange where the former gets Alisa back and the latter gets Vanessa back. With the Tablet of Time, Silvermane's youth is restored, but he continues to grow younger until he finally becomes an infant. Surprisingly, the Tablet is also able to revert the Lizard back to Connors. As the ordeal has caused Vanessa to leave him, Kingpin orders the Tablet gotten rid of as Hammerhead gives it to Adrian Toomes.
26	13	"Chapter XIII: Shriek of the Vulture"	Bob Richardson	Story by : John Semper, Gilles Wheeler and Eyelyn A-R Gabai; Teleplay by : Evelyn A-R Gabai	February 17, 1996
When Norman attempts to take over Toomes Aeronautical, Toomes becomes furious. He uses the Tablet of Time technology to steal youth from anyone he touches, becoming the Vulture to destroy Norman.
27	14	"Chapter XIV: The Final Nightmare"	Bob Richardson	Story by : John Semper and Sandy Fries; Teleplay by : Sandy Fries	February 24, 1996
Spider-Man seeks Connors' aid to help reverse the aging effects of the Vulture's talons. After absorbing Spider-Man's youth and DNA, the Vulture mutates into the monster spider that Spider-Man transformed into earlier. Meanwhile, the Scorpion goes to Farley Stillwell to seek a cure for his own mutation.

=== Season 3: The Sins of the Fathers (1996) ===
Each individual title had "The Sins of the Fathers" chapter prefix to it.

No. overall	No. in season	Title	Directed by	Written by	Original release date
The Sins of the Fathers
28	1	"Chapter I: Doctor Strange"	Bob Richardson	Story by : John Semper; Teleplay by : Mark Hoffmeier and John Semper	April 27, 1996
Mary Jane has now become evil and joined a villainous cult under the control of the magician Baron Mordo, being led to believe that she has a relationship with her father. As Spider-Man investigates the truth behind the cult's intentions, he has a meeting with Doctor Strange and Wong and aids them in preventing Mordo from unleashing Dormammu from the Dark Dimension. After the two are defeated and their plan is foiled, Strange tells Wong that he is sensing someone who is more powerful than he is.
29	2	"Chapter II: Make a Wish"	Bob Richardson	Story by : John Semper; Teleplay by : Mark Hoffmeier, Elliot S. Maggin and Meg McLaughlin	May 4, 1996
In a battle with Doctor Octopus, a medical research building is destroyed. Blaming himself, Peter is considering giving up being Spider-Man, when he meets an inter-dimensional being named Madame Web and his biggest fan, a little girl named Taina, with whom Spider-Man shares his origin story. While working for Kingpin, Doctor Octopus attacks with his new invention, the Octobot.
30	3	"Chapter III: Attack of the Octobot"	Bob Richardson	Story by : John Semper; Teleplay by : Meg McLaughlin and John Semper	May 11, 1996
During Spider-Man's battle with Octobot, Doctor Octopus uses a nerve-nullifying blaster to give Spider-Man amnesia, convincing him that he is his partner in crime, and Spider-Man goes on a crime spree. Taina manages to get Spider-Man to remember his true self; he then takes her back to her room, where he even reveals his true identity to her. Taina promises never to tell anyone. Spider-Man thinks that Taina was a bigger hero than himself. It is revealed that Taina is in a facility for terminally ill children and meeting Spider-Man was her last wish.
31	4	"Chapter IV: Enter the Green Goblin"	Bob Richardson	Story by : John Semper; Teleplay by : Marty Isenberg and Robert Skir	May 18, 1996
While developing a new gas for Kingpin to use as a weapon with help from Wardell Stromm, a mistake triggers an explosion and Norman disappears in the chaos. Soon after, a new super-strong villain utilizing the Hobgoblin's equipment, known as the Green Goblin appears and kidnaps Oscorp's stockholders, including Jameson, Anastasia and Kingpin. Spider-Man suspects that Norman's son Harry might be the culprit as he blamed them for causing his father's death. Eventually, Spider-Man rescues everyone and discovers that Green Goblin is Norman under the influence of a psychotic split personality seeking vengeance. In the ensuing chaos, an accident causes Norman to lose his memory of being Green Goblin as Spider-Man and Norman are rescued by Harry. Felicia later meets with Spider-Man, tells him that she is in love with him, and passionately kisses him.
32	5	"Chapter V: Rocket Racer"	Bob Richardson	Story by : John Semper; Teleplay by : Doug Booth and Mark Hoffmeier	September 14, 1996
Spider-Man tells Felicia that he can't have a girlfriend. She understands this, but wants Spider-Man to know how she feels about him. Meanwhile, Jackson Weele leads a gang of thieves armed with jet-pack technology. Weele has developed a large gyro-wheel in which he uses to plunge through the city. Peter wants to ask Felicia to a date, but she refuses because she is in love with Spider-Man. Robert Farrell tries to help his ailing mother by using science and the gang's technology to arm himself as the Rocket Racer as thugs threaten his mother for protection money. Peter later meets Felicia's latest love interest Jason Macendale.
33	6	"Chapter VI: Framed"	Bob Richardson	Story by : John Semper and Mark Hoffmeier; Teleplay by : Brooks Wachtel and Cynthia Harrison	September 21, 1996
After his first day in court, Peter recaps on how Kingpin's son Richard Fisk gave him a job at his company, how he has been framed for selling government secrets to foreign organizations, and is arrested by federal agent Susan Choi, who is working with Lee. Peter meets with Matt Murdock, a blind but talented defense attorney who secretly masquerades as the vigilante Daredevil. Back in the present, Peter is abducted by Spider-Man. It turns out that Richard Fisk had framed him and that the Spider-Man who abducted him is Chameleon in disguise as Daredevil rescues Peter.
34	7	"Chapter VII: The Man Without Fear"	Bob Richardson	Story by : John Semper and Mark Hoffmeier; Teleplay by : Sean Catherine Derek	September 28, 1996
Spider-Man and Daredevil attempt to clear Peter's name. Daredevil informs Spider-Man of Kingpin's true identity as a crime lord. Richard is also shown to be in collaboration with Choi. As Spider-Man battles the Chameleon, the stage is set for a fateful showdown between Daredevil and Kingpin, which leads to Peter being cleared of all charges and to the convictions of Richard, Choi, and Chameleon.
35	8	"Chapter VIII: The Ultimate Slayer"	Bob Richardson	Story by : John Semper; Teleplay by : Doug Booth and Mark Hoffmeier	October 5, 1996
Angry over his son's arrest and conviction as well as Spider-Man now knowing his secret identity to which he blames Alistair, Kingpin attempts to kill Spider-Man by turning Alistair into a cyborg. He pulls off this experiment with help from a half-mutated Landon, whom Kingpin brought in as Alistair's replacement. Thanks to Madame Web's cryptic riddle on why Alistair is working for Kingpin, Spider-Man finds that Alistair's father Spencer survived the explosion, with Kingpin placing him in cryogenic suspension to manipulate Alistair.
36	9	"Chapter IX: Tombstone"	Bob Richardson	Story by : John Semper; Teleplay by : Larry Brody, Marty Isenberg & Robert Skir and John Semper	October 12, 1996
Tombstone is hired by Alisa to destroy the story planned for the Daily Bugle revealing that she had taken over her father's criminal organization. Tombstone attempts to use Robertson, whom he was childhood friends with, to kill the story, using Robbie's son Randy to do it. With cryptic information from Madame Web, Spider-Man helps Robertson by setting Randy straight and defeating Tombstone.
37	10	"Chapter X: Venom Returns"	Bob Richardson	Story by : John Semper; Teleplay by : Stan Berkowitz, Len Wein, and John Semper	November 2, 1996
The symbiote returns to Earth and travels to Ravencroft to reunite with Brock, who then escapes as Venom. He is ordered by Dormammu and Mordo, to whom the symbiote owes its earthly return, to steal a machine from Stark Enterprises capable of releasing Dormammu from his own far-off dimension. After Madame Web's cryptic advice to "keep your friends close, but your enemies closer", Spider-Man fights Venom with help from War Machine.
38	11	"Chapter XI: Carnage"	Bob Richardson	Story by : John Semper; Teleplay by : Stan Berkowitz, James Krieg, and John Semper	November 9, 1996
When Brock refuses to continue to work for Dormammu and Mordo, they turn the psychotic Cletus Kasady into Carnage to collect life-force, which is essential for Dormammu to enter Earth. Carnage kidnaps Ashley Kafka, whom Brock has fallen in love with. Brock then reluctantly teams with Tony Stark / Iron Man and Spider-Man to save her.
39	12	"Chapter XII: The Spot"	Bob Richardson	James Krieg	October 26, 1996
Jonathon Ohn is a brilliant scientist who created the time dilation accelerator portal-making machine for Stark. Following the battle against Venom and Carnage, Stark shut down the accelerator project. Ohn is then approached by Kingpin, who funds Ohn's research, to have him continue the accelerator project, while Ohn falls in love with his assigned partner Dr. Silvia Lopez, who wants to seek greater reward for her efforts. After they complete the machine, Ohn is accidentally sucked into a portal, where numerous other portals attach to him, allowing him to create and recall the portals. Ohn calls himself the Spot and starts stealing money to help fund his project.
40	13	"Chapter XIII: Goblin War!"	Bob Richardson	Story by : John Semper; Teleplay by : Robert N. Skir & Marty Isenberg, Mark Hoffmeier, and John Semper	November 16, 1996
Norman returns as the Green Goblin where he and the Hobgoblin, whom he considers an impostor, clash over Ohn's time dilation accelerator. Meanwhile, Felicia is engaged to Jason, of whom Peter is very suspicious. This is confirmed as Jason is revealed to be the Hobgoblin as both of them are captured by the Green Goblin. The Green Goblin gets away while Jason is arrested.
41	14	"Chapter XIV: Turning Point"	Bob Richardson	Story by : John Semper; Teleplay by : Marty Isenberg & Robert N. Skir, James Krieg, and John Semper	November 23, 1996
Madame Web cryptically warns Spider-Man about a two-headed monster that will emerge soon. Norman, still with the Green Goblin in control, tries to use the time dilation accelerator to find out Spider-Man's secret identity. In the ensuing battle, Mary Jane and Green Goblin disappear into a portal. As Spider-Man gets angry at Web, she states that she will return one day as Spider-Man is still the "chosen one".

=== Season 4: Partners in Danger (1997) ===
Each individual title had the "Partners in Danger" chapter prefix to it.

No. overall	No. in season	Title	Directed by	Written by	Original release date
Partners In Danger
42	1	"Chapter I: Guilty"	Bob Richardson	Story by : John Semper; Teleplay by : Larry Brody and Meg McLaughlin	February 1, 1997
Spider-Man grieves over Mary Jane's loss following his battle against the Green Goblin. Meanwhile, Tombstone, whilst incarcerated in Ryker's Island, plots revenge on Robertson for previously causing his arrest. In exchange for assisting cellmate Richard in a few brawls in prison, Richard requests that his father frame Robertson as a criminal mastermind. Jameson works with Spider-Man to clear Robertson's name.
43	2	"Chapter II: The Cat"	Bob Richardson	Story by : John Semper; Teleplay by : Sean Catherine Derek	February 8, 1997
Doctor Octopus attempts to blackmail Anastasia into paying him ransom money to fund his experiments, by threatening to reveal to the world that Felicia's father John Hardesky was the crook known as "The Cat". Spider-Man finds that Hardesky is in S.H.I.E.L.D. custody as he tries to get information about him from Fury. Hardesky is revealed to have witnessed the creation of Captain America as a boy and fled from the Nazis working for Red Skull, who were posing as Allied agents. With some upgrades to his abilities, the Chameleon infiltrates the S.H.I.E.L.D. Helicarrier and hands Hardesky off to Kingpin while posing as Hardesky. Then Doctor Octopus abducts Felicia as Kingpin introduces Felicia to her father.
44	3	"Chapter III: The Black Cat"	Bob Richardson	Story by : John Semper; Teleplay by : Marty Isenberg & Robert N. Skir and Sean Catherine Derek	February 15, 1997
Kingpin and Doctor Octopus blackmail Hardesky into revealing the ingredients to the super-soldier formula by making threats against Felicia. After Hardesky reveals his secrets, Landon is able to recreate and improve the formula for Kingpin. He uses the serum to transform Felicia into the "Black Cat" and forces her to carry out his crimes until Landon can create more serum. Meanwhile, Fury finds out that the Hardesky they have is an impostor.
45	4	"Chapter IV: The Return of Kraven"	Bob Richardson	Meg McLaughlin	February 22, 1997
Spider-Man and the Black Cat attempt to confront Kraven. After the latter eludes the two heroes, there are various reports of attacks. Debra Whitman decides to investigate and she, Black Cat, Flash, and Curt Connors succeed in identifying the DNA as female. It turns out that Crawford had been given the same serum that empowered Kraven to heal her from an African plague. However, Crawford is mutated into a feral werecat before Connors creates a serum that restores to normal.
46	5	"Chapter V: Partners"	Bob Richardson	Story by : John Semper; Teleplay by : Cynthia Harrison and Brooks Wachtel	May 3, 1997
Alistair, currently working as Silvermane's top scientist, kidnaps the Black Cat and has her as his bound and gagged captive. He then bribes Spider-Man into capturing either the Scorpion or the Vulture, who both have unique DNA samples which are essential for Silvermane to restore his youth, in exchange for her release. But things get complicated during this rescue mission for the Black Cat.
47	6	"Chapter VI: The Awakening"	Bob Richardson	Story by : John Semper; Teleplay by : Sean Catherine Derek	May 10, 1997
Morbius is found by scientists and taken back to New York to have his condition studied. The Shocker kidnaps Morbius for Landon, who manages to revert Morbius back to his previous vampire form. In the confusion, Morbius escapes while Spider-Man fights his foes.
48	7	"Chapter VII: The Vampire Queen"	Bob Richardson	Story by : John Semper; Teleplay by : Meg McLaughlin and John Semper	May 17, 1997
After a confrontation with Miriam the Vampire Queen, Blade is horrified to learn that she was once his human mother. Using a psychic link, Miriam finds Morbius, who is fighting his vampire hunger, to find out what unconventional means he used to become one of her kind. Learning of the Neogenic Recombinator, Miriam plans to use the device to create more vampires to serve her.
49	8	"Chapter VIII: The Return of the Green Goblin"	Bob Richardson	Mark Hoffmeier	July 12, 1997
Trapped in the limbo between portals, the Green Goblin telepathically calls out to Harry. Keeping his true identity a secret, he promises Harry that he will see his father soon if he becomes the second Green Goblin. Meanwhile, thinking Peter knows where Mary Jane is, Anna unknowingly passes this information to the Punisher, who decides to help. When confronted by Spider-Man about the truth, during the skirmish between them and the Punisher, Harry is shocked when the Green Goblin shows him that he is his father, Norman. This, however, causes Harry to collapse, making him decide to truly take after his father by continuing on as the second Goblin, but is knocked out, with Spider-Man taking him to get help. An angry Norman watches from limbo but is more shocked as just when the Punisher confronts Peter, Mary Jane reappears.
50	9	"Chapter IX: The Haunting of Mary Jane Watson"	Bob Richardson	Story by : John Semper and Virginia Roth; Teleplay by : Meg McLaughlin and John Semper	July 19, 1997
After a brief fight with Mysterio, Peter learns that Mary Jane finally got her big break in recreating the film role made famous by actress Miranda Wilson. However, it was a trap set by Miranda, who had survived the accident on the filming of her movie that left her face burned on one side. Mysterio had taken on his supervillain identity to gather funds to rebuild her body as a cyborg. Miranda had the mistaken assumption that the machinery would transfer her mind into Mary Jane's body. Unable to let the world see what became of her, Miranda starts a self-destruct sequence for the studio, while Mysterio chooses to die with her. Watching from a distance, Spider-Man reveals his identity to Mary Jane.
51	10	"Chapter X: The Lizard King"	Bob Richardson	Story by : John Semper; Teleplay by : Gordon Kent	July 26, 1997
Peter proposes to Mary Jane and she accepts, much to Anna's discomfort. Peter and Mary Jane ask Connors to give her away at the wedding, when they are interrupted by three giant lizards who claim Connors is their father and kidnap him and Mary Jane. They are taken into the sewers, with Spider-Man in pursuit, and Connors becomes the Lizard again where the lizards want Connors to lead them.
52	11	"Chapter XI: The Prowler"	Bob Richardson	Story by : John Semper; Teleplay by : Terence Taylor	August 2, 1997
Peter finds Hobie Brown in his apartment where he wants him to enlist Spider-Man as Peter learns his origin. When the crime lord Iceberg finds out that Hobie doesn't feel that he is getting a fair cut, he has his boys attempt to kill him. After narrowly escaping that fate, Hobie steals a passer-by's purse in order to fund his new trip. It turns out to be Mary Jane's purse when she and Peter are in the process of apartment hunting, but Hobie is stopped by Spider-Man and sent to jail for violating his parole. While in jail, he saves Richard from an attempt on his life. As payment, Kingpin arranges for a hot shot lawyer to enable Hobie's release, and gives him a special suit as the Prowler. He uses the costume to get back at Iceberg. It soon causes him problems after the Kingpin finds that he defeated Iceberg and offers to fix it. Back in the present, Spider-Man thinks that Kingpin might be tampering with Prowler's suit.

=== Season 5 (1997–98) ===
This season has four main story arcs: "Six Forgotten Warriors" (episodes 2 to 6), "The Return of Hydro-Man" (episodes 7 and 8), "Secret Wars" (episodes 9 to 11), and "Spider Wars" (episodes 12 and 13).

No. overall	No. in season	Title	Directed by	Written by	Original release date
53	1	"The Wedding"	Bob Richardson	Story by : John Semper; Teleplay by : Meg McLaughlin and John Semper	September 12, 1997
Peter and Mary Jane are ready to tie the knot. Their plans are interrupted, however, when the Scorpion kidnaps May. Spider-Man gives chase and rescues May, but wonders if the fates are trying to tell him something. Meanwhile, Kingpin is paying for Peter and Mary Jane's wedding. When the wedding finally takes place, Harry shows up as the Green Goblin in the middle of the ceremony, grabs Mary Jane and threatens to blow up the church if the priest does not marry him and Mary Jane.
Six Forgotten Warriors
54	2	"Chapter I"	Bob Richardson	John Semper	September 19, 1997
In Moscow, Silver Sable surprises Dr. Grotizick. In America, Keene Marlow surprisingly visits May, who introduces him to her nephew, Peter, explaining Keene was an old friend of his uncle Ben. Peter finds the old passports of his parents Richard and Mary Parker. He subsequently shows them to May, who orders Peter to put them away. Peter, however, eavesdrops on his aunt and Keane's conversation. He discovers that May was being forced to reveal something to him sooner or later. He then leaves, wondering how the conversation continued. Peter then decides to leave America for Moscow, so that he could learn more about his parents' past. Robertson, having secret affairs to deal with in Russia, convinces Jameson to send both of them overseas because Peter lies about Spider-Man wanting to take over the Russian government and they need to cover the story. Meanwhile, Kingpin has reunited the Insidious Six with the Vulture replacing Mysterio to track down a doomsday weapon that could be connected to the situation. Spider-Man follows Robertson to an informant's house, where Silver Sable and the Wild Pack attack. They make off with the informant, leaving unconscious Spider-Man and Robertson with a quickly counting-down bomb.
55	3	"Chapter II: Unclaimed Legacy"	Bob Richardson	John Semper	September 26, 1997
Spider-Man is able to rescue Robertson and escape the explosion. The following day, Peter and Robertson visit the latter's friend, Moscow police officer Boris Pushkin, who claims to have known Peter's parents. Police chief Rhienholdt Kragov interrupts and threatens that Peter and Robertson will be arrested if they do not leave. Boris gave Robertson the address to Grotizick's daughter address and they visit, learning that Peter's parents were not Russian spies. The daughter's husband takes the evidence and Spider-Man learns he is actually the Chameleon who leads him to a trap. Spider-Man is then defeated, rendered unconscious, and taken to Kingpin by the Insidious Six, who reveals his plans to use the Doomsday Device. Spider-Man, the Six, and Kingpin are then kidnapped by Silver Sable and the Wild Pack who attack the building. Later, they find themselves at Chernobyl Nuclear Power Plant in Ukraine at the clutches of the Red Skull. Turns out, it is actually his son Kragov as Kingpin noted that the real Red Skull would have escaped from his grasp. He causes the fortress to crumble and escapes. Kingpin and the Six flee, leaving Sable and the Wild Pack in their shackles. Spider-Man frees them and they escape as well.
56	4	"Chapter III: Secrets of the Six"	Bob Richardson	John Semper	October 3, 1997
Peter and Robertson visit Omar Mosely, who tells them about the story of the Six American Warriors. During World War II after the creation of Captain America, five more heroes were made: Whizzer, Miss America, the Thunderer, the Destroyer, and the Black Marvel. They fought alongside Captain America. Due to the super-soldier formula not being the same as the one that was used to make Captain America, its members wears special rings to activate their powers. Now in the present, Spider-Man must find the former heroes before Kingpin does.
57	5	"Chapter IV: The Six Fight Again"	Bob Richardson	John Semper	October 10, 1997
As former sidekick of the late Black Marvel, Omar had hidden the Black Marvel's keys after his death. Now aware of the Insidious Six's theft of the majority of the keys, he was sure that they would search for them. Omar shows Robertson where the last keys are hidden. However, it unfolds to be the Chameleon impersonating Robertson and snatches the keys whilst the real Robertson, Kingpin, the Insidious Six, Spider-Man, and the Destroyer arrive. The Black Marvel also appears as Omar leaves. Spider-Man and the five members of the Six American Warriors fight the Insidious Six and Kingpin for the last ring. Kingpin wins custody of the keys and escapes with them, but the Chameleon betrays him and helps Kragov release their father the Red Skull. Spider-Man and the five other heroes meet up on a building and the Black Marvel reveals himself to be Omar. Omar reveals that when the original candidate for Black Marvel was taken away by his father, Omar replaced him. Thunderer was revealed to have kept an eye on the building while posing as a homeless man. Spider-Man and the Six Warriors are apprehended by Kingpin and the Insidious Six. Both sides are trapped by Red Skull as Silver Sable shows up to help Spider-Man.
58	6	"Chapter V: The Price of Heroism"	Bob Richardson	John Semper	October 17, 1997
Spider-Man and Silver Sable track down Kragov, the Chameleon, and the Red Skull, but are caught in a force field. Apparently, the Doomsday Device the Skull created in the past was made to have Kragov turn into a "god", being injected with electricity which allows him to create and manipulate electricity into doing his bidding. He wears a green suit and a lightning bolt mask, dubbing himself Electro.
The Return of Hydro-Man
59	7	"Part 1"	Bob Richardson	Story by : John Semper; Teleplay by : Eileen Fuentes and James Krieg	October 24, 1997
Peter and Mary Jane arrive in Niagara Falls for their postponed honeymoon, but it is soon interrupted when Hydro-Man returns and kidnaps Mary Jane. With Black Cat's help, Spider-Man sets off in pursuit.
60	8	"Part 2"	Bob Richardson	Story by : John Semper; Teleplay by : Meg McLaughlin and John Semper	October 31, 1997
Mary Jane is revealed to have new-found water-based powers like Hydro-Man. Spider-Man follows Hydro-Man to an underwater lab, where he discovers that scientist Miles Warren has used his controversial cloning technology to create a clone of the original Hydro-Man while working for someone whom he is keeping anonymous. He is even more shocked to learn that Warren then used a drop from Hydro-Man to clone Mary Jane. It turns out both clones are unstable and perish. Peter says goodbye to Mary Jane's clone. After Spider-Man leaves, Warren contacts Alistair to have Silvermane's men repair his laboratory as he is shown to have a sample of Spider-Man's costume. While mourning Mary Jane on a bridge, Spider-Man is visited by Madame Web who states that the time has come for him to do his part. In exchange, she will take Spider-Man to find Mary Jane.
Secret Wars
61	9	"Chapter I: Arrival"	Bob Richardson	John Semper and Karen Milovich	November 7, 1997
Madame Web brings Spider-Man to another dimension where he is brought before a being known as the Beyonder, who has chosen Spider-Man to be part of an experiment to see if good is more powerful than evil. He finds a paradise planet and chooses Doctor Octopus, Doctor Doom, Alistair, the Lizard, and the Red Skull as the villains to invade it. After speeding up the time there, the planet has been taken over. Spider-Man must lead a team of superheroes to save the planet. Using the abandoned laboratory and a transporter device, Spider-Man summons the Fantastic Four (consisting of Mister Fantastic, Invisible Woman, Human Torch, and the Thing), Iron Man, Captain America, and Storm of the X-Men. The Lizard appears and attacks Spider-Man, but the heroes knock him unconscious as alien worms attack. Storm and Invisible Woman combine their abilities to recharge the laborartory. They manage to agree to a team up as Iron Man and Mister Fantastic use the alien tech to reactivate the part of the Lizard's mind in which Connors' consciousness is. Now in control of himself, Connors sides with Spider-Man's team as Madame Web and the Beyonder are impressed so far.
62	10	"Chapter II: The Gauntlet of the Red Skull"	Bob Richardson	Virginia Roth	November 14, 1997
Doctor Octopus and Alistair join forces with the Red Skull. It is mentioned that Doctor Octopus' domain was taken over by Doom. Spider-Man brings Black Cat to the planet to help him just as she, Morbius, and Blade were battling Miriam and her vampires. The team cross a wasteland to attack the Red Skull's empire. Later, Spider-Man and Black Cat share a kiss.
63	11	"Chapter III: Doom"	Bob Richardson	John Semper, Mark Hoffmeier, and Ernie Altbacker	November 21, 1997
After defeating the Red Skull, Spider-Man and the team attempt to rendezvous with the Fantastic Four only to discover that they have been ambushed and that Doom has kidnapped the Thing. The heroes all go to rescue him, entering Doom's empire which they discover is a peaceful paradise. Doom used the technology of the planet to not only dethrone Doctor Octopus, but make his New Latveria a place of good. He even gave Thing a watch to switch him back to his human form, having accomplished something that Mister Fantastic has been unable to do. After learning of the Beyonder's powers, Doom decides to absorb him to ensure eternal peace by banishing the other villains back to Earth. However, demons pop out of his dreams as he sleeps. With Spider-Man's help, heroes are able to defeat Dr. Doom, proving good is superior. The Beyonder erases the others' memories and sends them back to Earth. He then reveals to Spider-Man that this was a test to show if he was worthy of the true challenge.
Spider Wars
64	12	"Chapter I: I Really, Really Hate Clones"	Bob Richardson	Story by : John Semper; Teleplay by : James Krieg, Mark Hoffmeier, and John Semper	January 31, 1998
Spider-Man is taken to an alternate dimension where due to a series of events, its native Peter has bonded with the Carnage symbiote to become Spider-Carnage, who has devastated and demolished New York City with the aid of Kingpin, Alistair, the Hobgoblin, and the Green Goblin. That world's Jameson tried to make contact to any survivors while Robertson was proven that Jameson was right about Spider-Man. The Beyonder tells Spider-Man that his deranged counterpart plans to use a matter-disintegrator bomb powered by the Time-Dilation Accelerator to destroy the multiverse, and the only way to stop him is for Spider-Man to lead a group of Spider-Men from different dimensions to prevent the blast. Allied with Spider-Carnage's brother through cloning, Scarlet Spider, as well as a high-tech Spider-Man, a six-armed Spider-Man, a Spider-Man with a copy of Doctor Octopus' tentacles, and an actor dressed as Spider-Man, the primary Spider-Man assaults Spider-Carnage's gang at the Kingpin's base. However, the six-armed Spider-Man turns into the Man-Spider mid-mission.
65	13	"Chapter II: Farewell, Spider-Man"	Bob Richardson	John Semper	January 31, 1998
The Spider-Men stop Spider-Carnage in his home dimension, but he escapes to the high-tech Spider-Man's dimension. After they save everyone, the Beyonder disappears after teleporting Man-Spider away while Madame Web sends the alternate Kingpin to a prison on his Earth. With limited power, Madame Web sends the main Spider-Man to this dimension since the high-tech Spider-Man is still paralyzed for his actions. Once there, he finds out his alternate counterpart started the Peter Parker Science Foundation where his identity is known, he is engaged to Gwen Stacy, Jameson doesn't hate Spider-Man, Kingpin is Peter's lawyer, and finds Mary Jane alive. Spider-Carnage arrives and dupes this reality's Kingpin into helping him until the truth is revealed. Peter then finds this reality's Ben, who is still alive and manages to bring the real Peter's personality out of Spider-Carnage. However, the symbiote is too strong and Spider-Carnage jumps into an unstable portal that destroys him. All the Spider-Men have been returned home. The Spider-Man who was just an actor explains that in his world, Spider-Man is a fictional character. Spider-Man travels to that world where he meets his creator Stan Lee and takes him web-swinging as thanks for creating him. Madame Web then takes Spider-Man to find where Mary Jane is as a reward for saving reality. Notes: The X-Men '97 first season finale "Tolerance is Extinction – Part 3" (2024) reveals that Spider-Man successfully found Mary Jane.

== Sources ==
- "Season 1 episode order, and Original Airdates". marvel.toonzone.net. Archived from the original on Dec 27th, 2025.
- "Season 2 episode order, and Original Airdates". marvel.toonzone.net. Archived from the original on Dec 29th, 2025.
- "Season 3 episode order, and Original Airdates". marvel.toonzone.net.
- "Season 4 episode order, and Original Airdates". marvel.toonzone.net. Archived from the original on January 17th, 2026.
- "Season 5 episode order, and Original Airdates". marvel.toonzone.net.
