= Spider-Man: Fake Red =

Japanese manga series

- Cover of the Japanese volume

スパイダーマン / 偽りの赤 (Supaidāman: Itsuwari no Aka)
- Manga
- Written by: Yusuke Osawa
- Published by: Kodansha
- English publisher: NA: Viz Media
- Imprint: Shōnen Magazine Comics
- Magazine: Magazine Pocket
- Original run: July 26, 2019 – March 6, 2020
- Volumes: 1

Spider-Man: Fake Red (スパイダーマン / 偽りの赤, Supaidāman: Itsuwari no Aka) is a Japanese manga series written and illustrated by Yusuke Osawa and "supervised" by Marvel Comics, based on the Spider-Man brand by Stan Lee and Steve Ditko. Published by Viz Media, and set in its own continuity within the Marvel Multiverse, the series follows teenage high school student and amateur rock climber Yu Onomae who is compelled to fill in for the missing Peter Parker as Spider-Man on finding the hero's suit in an alley. Over the course of his journey, he faces off against the supervillains Scorpion, Screwball, Mysterio, and Venom, and teams up with the original Spider-Man's partner Silk in an effort to find him.

The series, originally published across fourteen chapters in Magazine Pocket between July 2019 and March 2020 (following the original three-part one-shot), was published as a graphic novel, Spider-Man: Fake Red: Phase 1 in Japanese on April 9, 2023, and in English on June 13, 2023, although a second volume has not been ordered. In April 2024, the series was digitally published to the mobile applications Viz Media and Marvel Unlimited. The series has received a universally positive critical reception.

== Premise ==
Yu Onomae is an unpopular high school student, who has no friends and is failing his classes. All that changes when he finds Spider-Man's suit abandoned in an alleyway, which he uses to impersonate the hero. Only when Spider-Man's enemies attack and it becomes clear the superhero has vanished (and that due to Yu having been wearing the suit, no one else had realised the original Spider-Man to be missing), Yu uses his amateur rock-climbing skills and can-do attitude to attempt to fill in for the hero, having to use his mind to outmanoeuvre supervillains who mostly outmatch him physically, assisted by his best friend Emma and Spider-Man's partner Silk. Meanwhile, a flashback storyline shows what happened to the original Spider-Man, Peter Parker.

== Characters ==
- Yu Onomae – A Japanese-American high school student and would-be amateur rock climber who is compelled to become a new, powerless Spider-Man on finding the original's suit abandoned in an alleyway.
- Emma Pearson – A classmate of Yu's and a fellow rock climber who discovers him close to the Spider-Man suit and, believing him to have always been Spider-Man, decides to assist him as his "girl in the chair". While Yu is reluctant to tell Emma the truth due to nursing a crush on her, he relents when she comes out to him, and she becomes his gay best friend.
- Cindy Moon / Silk / Spider-Woman – Peter's best friend and a fellow spider-themed superhero who is searching for the missing hero, as the only person other than Yu to know he is missing. While insisting to Yu that Peter is "just like a brother" to her, Cindy is revealed to have a crush on Peter.
- Peter Parker / Venom – The former superhero Spider-Man, who unbeknownst to anyone else has been overtaken by the Venom symbiote, now living as a mindless cannibal in the sewers of New York.
- Screwball – A supervillain and would-be influencer who threatens to set off bombs across New York lest "Spider-Man" attend her livestream.
- Quentin Beck / Mysterio / Venom – A supervillain who pursues Yu, thinking him to be Peter, whose secret identity he has uncovered. Having adapted his illusions to overwhelm Peter's spider-sense, Mysterio is surprised when the powerless Yu is unaffected, and he beats Mysterio (disguised as MJ Watson), whom Yu does not recognise) as a result. After Peter is freed from the Venom symbiote, it takes Mysterio as a host, and he fights Parker and Yu.
- Mary Jane "MJ" Watson – Peter's ex-girlfriend, who is oblivious to his disappearance due to Yu's activities.
- Sarah Jane Watson – MJ's younger cousin and one of Yu's classmates, on whom Emma has a crush.

== Reception ==
Spider-Man: Fake Red has received a universally positive critical reception, with the characterisation of its original Spider-Man incarnation Yu Onomae being praised, CBR praising the "great story [and] lovable main characters".
