= Screwball (character) =

Publication information
- Publisher: Marvel Comics
- First appearance: Amazing Spider-Man #559 (July 2008)
- Created by: Dan Slott (writer); Marcos Martín (artist)

In-story information
- Species: Human
- Team affiliations: Deadpool Inc.
- Notable aliases: Screwball
- Abilities: Expert gymnast

Screwball is a supervillain appearing in American comic books published by Marvel Comics. Created by writer Dan Slott and artist Marcos Martín, the character first appeared in Amazing Spider-Man #559 (July 2008). Screwball is depicted as the first "live-streaming supervillain", an influencer who records her crimes and battles in an attempt to gain internet fame as a recurring antagonist of the superhero Spider-Man.

Natalie Lander voices an original incarnation of Screwball, Liz Allan, in the 2017 animated series Spider-Man, while Stephanie Lemelin voices an adaptation of the anonymous comic-book Screwball in the 2018 video game Spider-Man and its DLC, The City That Never Sleeps.

== Publication history ==
Screwball debuted in Amazing Spider-Man #559 (July 2008), and was created by writer Dan Slott and artist Marcos Martín. She subsequently appeared in several Marvel series, including Superior Spider-Man (2013), Marvel Action: Spider-Man (2021), Spider-Man: Fake Red (2021), and Amazing Spider-Man (2022).

== Fictional character biography ==
Not much is known about Screwball's past, including her real name or even what she looks like due to her always making sure to cover her face. A narcissistic internet personality with sociopathic tendencies, Screwball has a live film crew record her as she carries out incredibly dangerous stunts, with no regard for who gets hurt or how much damage she causes so long as it pleases her fanbase. She first encounters Spider-Man while he is tracing the "Spider-Tracer Killer" and quickly becomes obsessed with him and his fame as a superhero, which she tries to exploit by manipulating him into participating in her live feed.

Screwball later poses as Spider-Man to help Bookie, with the two filming Spider-Man fighting the villain Basher. The fight is uploaded on YouTube and watched by the patrons of the Bar with No Name. The Enforcers recognize what is happening and attack Bookie, only for him to be rescued when the real Spider-Man appears. During a later fight with Screwball, Spider-Man is humiliated, causing Ben Reilly to refuse to buy Peter Parker's photos.

Following the "Gang War" storyline, Screwball uses drones to pull off a pique to gain more followers. These drones end up attacking Spider-Woman and Spider-Boy. Screwball later speaks through the drones, who combine into a giant robot. When the robot is defeated, Spider-Woman and Spider-Boy use one of the drones to track down Screwball. They defeat Screwball and leave her for the police.

== Powers and abilities ==
Screwball is a skilled gymnast with extensive parkour training, enabling her to navigate environments with ease. Her abilities are typically centered around her parkour expertise, which she uses to her advantage in maneuvering through New York City's urban landscape. She also manages a team of cameramen and technicians who capture footage and maintain her website. While relying on her crew to document her exploits, Screwball also keeps an additional camera in her helmet.

== Reception ==
Joshua Kristian McCoy of Game Rant described Screwball as an ideal character for a "meta-comedy film about filmmaking or social media." Leah Bernstein of Comic Book Resources characterized Screwball as having an irritating charm, similar to the Riddler in the Batman: Arkham series of games. She noted that Screwball's confident yet abrasive personality fits her role as a thrill-seeking influencer wannabe, making her unlikable in a way that is refreshingly different from some of the literal monsters Spider-Man face.

== Other versions ==
An alternate universe version of Screwball from Earth-19759 appears in Spider-Man: Fake Red. When Screwball threatens to bomb a building, Yu pushes himself to his physical limits to pursue her, nearly dying from exhaustion as he swings several stories above the ground before finally confronting her face-to-face.

== In other media ==
=== Television ===
- An original incarnation of Screwball, Liz Allan, appears in the Spider-Man (2017) episode "Screwball Live!", voiced by Natalie Lander.
- Screwball makes a cameo in Your Friendly Neighborhood Spider-Man. During one of Peter Parker's livestreams, her username appears in the comment feed, where she urges viewers to watch her own stream instead of his.

=== Video games ===
Screwball appears in Spider-Man (2018), voiced by Stephanie Lemelin. She appears in a side mission, faking her own kidnapping to get Spider Man to appear on her live-stream. She returns in The City That Never Sleeps DLC., where she tasks Spider-Man with combat and stealth challenges to boost her live-stream views. After completing all of her challenges, Screwball challenges Spider-Man to a "chase" across New York; after he manages to catch up to her, Screwball is taken into custody by the police while trying to live-stream her own arrest.

=== Miscellaneous ===
In 2017, Diamond Select Toys released a Screwball action figure inspired by the Liz Allan incarnation of the character.
