= Mysterio =

Marvel Comics fictional character

- Mysterio as depicted in The Amazing Spider-Man Annual #1 (October 1964). Art by Steve Ditko.

Publication information
- Publisher: Marvel Comics
- First appearance: The Amazing Spider-Man #13 (June 1964)
- Created by: Stan Lee; Steve Ditko

In-story information
- Alter ego: Quentin Beck
- Species: Human
- Team affiliations: Sinister Six; Maggia
- Notable aliases: Dr. Ludwig Rinehart; Cage McKnight; Gerdes; Mysty
- Abilities: Master illusionist; Expert in special effects and robotics; Uses suit embedded with advanced technology and gadgetry

Mysterio is the alias of several supervillains appearing in American comic books published by Marvel Comics. Created by Stan Lee and Steve Ditko, the character first appeared in The Amazing Spider-Man #13 (June 1964). He is one of the superhero Spider-Man's most enduring enemies and belongs to the collective of adversaries that make up his rogues gallery. He is also a founding member of the supervillain team the Sinister Six, and has fought other heroes, including Daredevil. In Wolverine: Old Man Logan, an alternate Mysterio serves as the archenemy of Old Man Logan, an elderly Wolverine tricked by Mysterio into killing the rest of the X-Men, with another alternate Mysterio serving as the villain of Spider-Man: Fake Red, becoming Venom.

The first and best-known version of the character is Quentin Beck, a former special effects artist, illusionist and actor who turns to crime. The second incarnation of the character, Daniel Berkhart, is a stuntman initially hired by J. Jonah Jameson to pretend to be Mysterio's ghost before assuming the mantle for real. The third incarnation of the character, Francis Klum, is a mutant with the ability to teleport who blames Spider-Man for the loss of his leg. The fourth incarnation of the character, Mysterion, is a black man who buys the Mysterio identity from Roderick Kingsley, opposing the Superior Spider-Man and Squirrel Girl.

The character has been adapted in various media incarnations, including feature films, television series and video games, with Mary Kate Wiles voicing an original composite incarnation of Mysterio named Frances Beck in Ultimate Spider-Man in 2016. Jake Gyllenhaal portrayed Mysterio in the Marvel Cinematic Universe (MCU) film Spider-Man: Far From Home (2019).

== Publication history ==
Mysterio was created by Stan Lee and Steve Ditko and first appears in The Amazing Spider-Man #13 (June 1964). It was later retconned that the aliens seen in The Amazing Spider-Man #2 had been Mysterio and his men in disguise. It was revealed that he had been hired by the Tinkerer to disguise himself as an extraterrestrial and uncover military and industrial secrets. Like the Kingpin, he has crossed over and been a major villain of Daredevil. In the story arc "Guardian Devil", he crossed into Daredevil's territory, almost pushing Daredevil over the edge.

== Fictional character biography ==
=== Background and first appearances ===
Quentin Beck is a special effects master and stunt man working for a major Hollywood studio with dreams of making a name for himself in the film industry. However, he came to see his career in special effects as a dead-end job. His attempts to become an actor were poorly received, but he realized that his expertise in illusions could make him an effective criminal. In his first battle with Spider-Man, after he frames Spider-Man for robbing the Midtown Museum, Mysterio obstructs the hero's spider-sense with gas and dissolves Spider-Man's webbing with a chemical abrasive. However Spider-Man tricks Mysterio into revealing he robbed the museum, then Spider-Man revealed he had captured it on tape. Mysterio was then jailed, blaming Spider-Man for his ruined career.

Mysterio later joins the Sinister Six in an attempt at revenge on Spider-Man. In an elaborate scheme, Doctor Octopus gives each member of the Sinister Six a card with the location of the next battle written on it. Each location was carefully selected to best suit that member's particular talents and Spider-Man will have to fight them one after the other. Only once Spider-Man has defeated each opponent, will he be able to obtain the card that will identify the next location. Doctor Octopus believed that with this plan, each of the Sinister Six would weaken Spider-Man a little bit more so that his chances would grow slimmer after each battle. When Spider-Man reaches Mysterio, his third opponent, he is immediately attacked by a group of highly developed robot replicas of the X-Men controlled by Mysterio. After successfully defeating the robots and Mysterio, Spider-Man gets the next card that enables him to go on to battle the Sandman.

=== Further appearances and decline ===
Cover of The Amazing Spider-Man #618 (March 2011 Marvel Comics), art by Marcos Martín

Mysterio later creates the alias of world-renowned psychiatrist Dr. Ludwig Rinehart, using technology and hypnosis in an attempt to make Spider-Man lose his mind, and nearly convincing him to unmask himself, though ironically Spider-Man was helped by J. Jonah Jameson suddenly bursting into the house. Spider-Man then unmasked Mysterio. Mysterio then establishes a brief partnership with the Wizard in a plot to kill Spider-Man and the Human Torch on a Hollywood movie set by pretending to enroll them in a film. However, they were both defeated and arrested. He threatens to destroy the city while on TV, and goes on to convince Spider-Man he is 6 inches (15 cm) tall using a post-hypnotic suggestion and a miniature funfair, but Spider-Man sees through the illusion and captures Mysterio yet again.

While Beck is incarcerated, his cellmate Daniel Berkhart briefly becomes Mysterio on the original's behalf. Out of prison, Beck resumes his Ludwig Rinehart identity to manipulate Spider-Man's Aunt May into revealing the whereabouts of a lost fortune hidden in her house. Beck used bogus alien disguises to frighten May into revealing the location of the fortune, but then learned that the money had long ago been eaten by silverfish. In his next appearance, Mysterio tricks Spider-Man into believing that he had caused the death of a bystander. Mysterio then attempts to scare the tenants from an apartment complex in a real estate scam thwarted by the Power Pack, much to his later humiliation. He is recruited by Doctor Octopus to form the second Sinister Six, and battles Spider-Man. In other encounters, Mysterio has faked the death of Spider-Man's Aunt May, and made deals with demons from Limbo. Despite this, however, Mysterio was constantly beaten by Spider-Man and usually arrested. He joined Doctor Octopus' Sinister Six on several occasions, but this never gave him the edge against his foe that he desired. Eventually, he began to lose credibility as a supervillain, with his defeat at the hands of Power Pack being a particularly humiliating moment.

=== "Guardian Devil" and death ===
After his final imprisonment during the "Guardian Devil" story arc, Mysterio was given an early release, as he had been diagnosed with a brain tumor and lung cancer, both caused by the chemicals and radiation from his equipment. He was given one year to live, but this imminent death caused prison psychiatrists to grant him an early release. Obsessed with exacting his final revenge on Spider-Man, he was disappointed when he deduced from newspaper articles that the current Spider-Man was just a clone and saw no dignity in overpowering a "copy" of the real thing (even though by then, the clone had been killed and the current Spider-Man was indeed the original). Mysterio decided to change his plan and focus on Daredevil, whom he had encountered recently during an insurance scam that the hero had thwarted; Mysterio believed that he had found a 'kindred spirit' in Daredevil, in the sense that both were second stringers with little reputation outside their homes.

After the Kingpin gave Mysterio information about Daredevil's past, Mysterio developed an elaborate plot to drive Daredevil insane using a special designed drug to influence Daredevil's mood, presenting him with a baby girl and conflicting reports that she was the second coming of Christ or the Antichrist, with the drug rendering Daredevil violent if anyone suggested that the child was innocent. In the course of the scheme, Karen Page was killed by Bullseye after Mysterio had convinced her that she was suffering from HIV due to her time as a porn star, Matt Murdock's partner Foggy Nelson was framed for murder after cheating on his current lover, and Daredevil nearly lost his mind while tormented by a demonic figure who was in fact Gabriel, an agent of Mysterio.

However, Daredevil's will proved stronger than Mysterio expected, and once Doctor Strange discovers and magically removed the drug from Daredevil's bloodstream, Daredevil unmasked Mysterio as the mastermind, shattering the villain's helmet in fury and revealing his now-languishing appearance. Beck had thought Daredevil would kill him upon discovery, which in his eyes, was a "grand way to end his final show". Daredevil denied him this and instead dismissed Mysterio's scheme as a basic 'B-movie' plot and calling Mysterio a 'human Xerox', incapable of having an original thought in his life; if nothing else, the Kingpin had already attempted to drive Daredevil insane and he had used the 'supernatural intruding on our world' idea in a previous attack on J. Jonah Jameson. Mysterio, saying he was stealing an idea from Kraven the Hunter, commits suicide. While Mysterio has faked his own death several times in the past, this act was apparently legitimate, as Mysterio had nothing left to live for.

=== Resurrection ===
Mysterio unmasked in Friendly Neighborhood Spider-Man #12, art by Todd Nauck

Sometime later, Quentin Beck suddenly appears in the Midtown High School auditorium in a dark red version of his costume during a three-way battle between Spider-Man and the two successor Mysterios. He confronts Francis Klum before leaving him for Berkhart to deal with. Beck confronts Miss Arrow, revealing that half his head is missing from the gunshot wound and explains that, having gone to Hell for suicide, his "superiors" in the afterlife sent him back to Earth to maintain a cosmic balance. His superiors want Spider-Man to continue working at the school and Beck knows Miss Arrow has a similar role for the "other side". Berkhart and Klum briefly battle one another before Spider-Man captures Berkhart. While trying to escape, Klum runs into Arrow and tries to take her as a hostage, only to be stabbed by one of her stingers. He then teleports away, badly bleeding.

Mysterio reappears during The Gauntlet story line, which re-introduces several past Spider-Man villains with new twists. This Mysterio claims to be a returned Quentin Beck who had faked his death. He is under the employ of Maggia crime member Carmine, creating androids of various deceased Maggia (including their dead leader Silvermane) to give them a credibility boost in their gang war with Mister Negative. Beck controls the Silvermane robot himself and plants seeds of rebellion in Hammerhead, who had left the Maggia under the belief that Silvermane was deceased. He also tries to drive Spider-Man mad by making him think he's accidentally killed several gang members, while trying to convince him that a returned Captain George Stacy, who claims to have always been the gangster known as the Big Man, also faked his death years earlier. This turn makes Spider-Man realize that Mysterio must be behind the recent mysterious return of so many deceased individuals, and he vows to have Mysterio pay for making it personal. Shortly after, Mysterio uses the Silvermane robot to murder Carmine in an attempt to secretly seize control of the Maggia and its fortune. Spider-Man eventually exposes and confronts Mysterio, who flees. He later runs into the Chameleon, who tells him that he has some friends who are "dying" to meet him. The "friends" the Chameleon was talking about happens to be the Kravinoffs. He was present at the ritual where Spider-Man is seemingly sacrificed to revive Kraven the Hunter.

During the Origin of the Species story line, Mysterio is among the supervillains invited by Doctor Octopus to join his villains' team where he is promised that he will receive a reward. Mysterio went after Spider-Man for Menace's infant. He manages to trick Spider-Man into giving him the child by projecting an image of Avengers Mansion and uses his illusions to try to frighten Spider-Man. Ultimately, Spider-Man recovers the baby from Mysterio after figuring out the villain's involvement. Mysterio is next seen as part of the new Sinister Six organized by Doctor Octopus. He first works with Chameleon to distract Spider-Man and the Future Foundation, faking an attack in the Caribbean by zombie pirates while the rest of the Six steal something from the Fantastic Four's headquarters. He also participates in an attack by the Six on the Avengers Academy. When the Sinister Six launch an attack on the Intelligencia and their new doomsday weapon, Mysterio is responsible for taking down the Red Ghost and his Super-Apes.

=== Subsequent schemes ===
Doctor Octopus and Mysterio later coordinate the Octobots that have infiltrated the Apogee 1 Space Station. When Mysterio notices that some of the Octobots were disabled, Doctor Octopus orders the Octobots to finish their mission and then destroy the space station. Spider-Man, the Human Torch and John Jameson later discover that some of the space station's crew members have been taken over by the Octobots, making them Octobot-controlled zombies that obey Doctor Octopus's commands. While in their undersea base, Doctor Octopus and Mysterio discover that their Octobot-controlled zombies have passed out. After Apogee 1 Space Station is destroyed and the crew is evacuated by Spider-Man, the Human Torch and John Jameson, Doctor Octopus tells the rest of the Sinister Six that his master plan is about to begin.

Although Mysterio aids Doctor Octopus in his attack against the Avengers and his plan to "heal" the world during the "Ends of the Earth" story line, he agrees to help Spider-Man, Silver Sable and the Black Widow defeat Doctor Octopus's plans after Spider-Man convinces him that Doctor Octopus will not honor any deal he has made with the Six, as he will almost certainly scorch Earth if his plan succeeds. Mysterio leads Spider-Man and his allies to a Mayan temple where Doctor Octopus's base is located (claiming that he was responsible for the choice of location due to the supposed Mayan prophecies of the world ending in 2012), leaving them to face the mind-controlled Avengers. After disabling the Octobots that were controlling the Avengers, Mysterio lends Spider-Man and Silver Sable his vehicle and provides them with the location of Doctor Octopus' base. He then disappears in a cloud of smoke and leaves the heroes to deal with Octavius.

During the Spider-Men story line, it is revealed that Mysterio has crossed over to the Ultimate Marvel universe multiple times.. Mysterio later appears in Ultimate Comics Spider-Man #1, blasting the Ultimate version of the Kingpin out the window of a skyscraper following the "Ultimatum". He publicly confesses to Wilson Fisk's murder and threatens the city, stating that he is now in charge. He releases a fear hallucinogen across Manhattan to rob the Federal Bank. Spider-Man stops him and Mysterio's personal hatred for the web slinger increases. Creating an illusion of the Hulk to lure Spider-Man to him, Mysterio ambushes and severely wounds the hero. Before Mysterio can unmask and kill Spider-Man, a mysterious vigilante rescues him and together they defeat Mysterio, revealing his true face. Mysterio finds Spidey's blood on his broken armor and designs a Spider-Slayer that personally targets Peter. Spider-Man defeats it. Before Mysterio can do anything else, the police rush to his hideout which they found by tracking a piece of Mysterio's tech. Mysterio curses and proceeds to blow up his hideout. He encounters the mainstream Spider-Man after his last travel. In the struggle, Spider-Man is transported to the Ultimate Universe, where Mysterio reveals that his Ultimate counterpart is a remotely controlled robotic avatar. Despite his best efforts to throw Spider-Man and the Ultimates off with their worst fears, Mysterio is quickly defeated. Nick Fury decides to keep Mysterio prisoner due to his knowledge of Peter's secret identity.

Eight months after the events of Secret Wars, Mysterio attacks Parker Industries with the intention of using the company's Webware technology to cause mass hysteria by beaming imagery directly into the minds of the product's users. The plot is thwarted by Deadpool, who runs Mysterio over with his "Dead-Buggy". While recovering in the hospital, Beck is visited by an unknown figure, who leaves a Mysterio bust on the supervillain's bedside table while declaring that he is "not out of the game yet". After Deadpool is manipulated into killing Spider-Man, Mysterio tortures the hero's Limbo-bound soul by projecting his own spirit into the realm using power provided by a mysterious benefactor. Deadpool enters Limbo and help Spider-Man overpower Mysterio, who is afterward shown to have disappeared from his hospital bed.

=== Retirement and return to villainy ===
After being beaten by the likes of Deadpool and other superheroes, Quentin Beck left the supervillain business and relocated to Las Vegas. His daughter Misty Beck shows up to persuade him to become Mysterio again. Dusk shows some awareness of this, as she warns the Scarlet Spider about Mysterio, but when Reilly visits the villain, he accepts Beck's explanation that he has decided to retire. Misty later involves her father in a ritual that would grant her great power if she sacrificed something she truly loved in exchange. But when she attempted to kill Beck, Reilly's intervention distracted her long enough for Beck to accidentally stab her resulting in him gaining the power himself as he places his left hand on the altar while shedding Misty's blood. Now possessing power drawn from Cyttorak, Beck recreates his Mysterio costume and attacks the Scarlet Spider. The Scarlet Spider defeats his foe by cutting off the hand that touched the altar, taking away Beck's power.

Mysterio later created the illusion of an alien invasion that lured every superhero team to fight them. Spider-Man discovered Mysterio's plot and defeated him. Mysterio stated that he wanted to become more than a lesser criminal as Spider-Man webbed him up for the police. When in court, Janice Lincoln appeared as Mysterio's lawyer as the vision of an unidentified entity with centipedes on him appeared in the courthouse, claiming to be the one who revived Mysterio.

In the series "Dead Man Logan," Miss Sinister coaxes Quentin Beck into becoming Mysterio again in exchange for keeping him safe from Old Man Logan. Miss Sinister informed him that his counterpart tricked Wolverine into killing the X-Men. To take over the world, Miss Sinister and Mysterio side with Neo-Hydra. Mysterio would later find out that Miss Sinister and Neo-Hydra would dispose of him once he has served his purpose. This led to Mysterio taking Logan to Neo-Hydra's base. During the battle between Logan and Neo-Hydra, Mysterio used an illusion to make Logan think that he killed him. Quentin then makes his way back to Bedford Hills Psychiatric Hospital while tossing out his Mysterio costume.

=== Dealings with Kindred ===
Mysterio is later shown attending a meeting with psychiatrist Dr. Winhorst, where he affirms his old story that he was sent to Hell after his suicide and was released by some demonic entity whose name he fears to say. Winhorst attempts to convince Beck that he actually faked his suicide and his belief in the demon is just his former illness causing him to hallucinate. But when the demon that brought Beck back to life appears in the psychiatrist's office, it affirms that the "demon" is real. When Winhorst flees, Mysterio begs forgiveness from the entity. Although initially prepared to spare Mysterio, the entity realizes that Peter is somehow witnessing these events in a dream. The entity adopts the temporary alias of Kindred and kills Beck again so that he cannot reveal his identity to Spider-Man before Kindred is ready. However, it is soon established that the "Mysterio" who died was actually Winhorst, who was brainwashed by Mysterio to believe that he was the supervillain to give Mysterio a chance to escape from Bedford Hills Psychiatric Hospital. Although Kindred is angered that Mysterio shared his real name with Winhorst to increase the reality of the delusion, he notes that Mysterio keeps running from his purpose and gives him a script to stick to.

More recently, Mysterio had begun production on a film with Mary Jane Watson on a remote set he used to torment Spider-Man, to make a play for a girl he wronged while under the alias of Cage McKnight. After being discovered by Mary Jane, they cooperated in the project, but the filming was turned tumultuous by the Savage Six when the Vulture felt insulted by the "unauthorized use" of his person in the film's plot. Nevertheless, thanks to an authentic recording of their attack, the movie became a rousing success.

=== Sinister War ===
In a prelude to the "Sinister War" story line, Mysterio is still in Kindred's servitude as he places Mysterio in Doctor Octopus' latest incarnation of the Sinister Six. Peter and Mary Jane Watson are attending the premiere of MJ's new movie, which she worked on with Mysterio under the alias of Cage McKnight. Peter is planning to publicly propose to Mary Jane, but is attacked by the Savage Six. Mysterio comes to Mary Jane's rescue, exposing his identity to Peter and the Savage Six. Doctor Octopus then attacks the theater with Electro, Kraven the Hunter, the Lizard, and the Sandman as Doctor Octopus states to the Vulture that they need Mysterio. Mary Jane confesses to a concerned Peter that she knew who Mysterio was all along and vouches for him. Mysterio tries to tell Peter that he and Mary Jane's deal with Mephisto is to blame for everything that is presently happening, but Peter is far too distracted by the warring factions. Doctor Octopus offers Mysterio the opportunity to join the Sinister Six as long as he helps them capture Mary Jane. Mysterio complies and teleports away taking MJ with him while promising her that the "devil will get his due".

Mary Jane is transported to Mysterio's old studios where Beck reveals what happened to him after his suicide, transported to hell, and tortured there until Harry Osborn made him a deal. Taking it, Beck was revived around the time Peter's identity was public knowledge, his adventures in the Spider-Men crossover are referenced, and over time Harry stopped communicating with him until recently. Mysterio also reveals to Mary Jane that he was the therapist who helped her come to terms with Harry's death, but Mary Jane barely remembers this. Mary Jane pleas with Beck, reminding him he has changed, but Mysterio remains loyal to the deal he struck and tells Mary Jane that he knows what fate awaits him. Mysterio rejoins the teams of villains while leaving Mary Jane to the mercy of Kindred. It is later revealed that Mysterio used his time as Mary Jane's therapist to implant false memories of Gwen Stacy confessing to a brief affair with Norman Osborn, thus justifying the existence of Gwen's adult children, Gabriel and Sarah (actually clones created by an A.I. Harry, the trio together being Kindred), with A.I. Harry also having faked an affair with Norman (posing as Gwen himself) to back up the deception.

== Other characters named Mysterio ==
Other characters named Mysterio

Publication information
- Publisher: Marvel Comics
- First appearance: Daniel Berkhart: The Amazing Spider-Man #141 (February 1975); Francis Klum: Spider-Man/Black Cat: The Evil that Men Do #6 (August 2002); Mysterion: Avenging Spider-Man #22 (June 2013)
- Created by: Daniel Berkhart: Gerry Conway; Ross Andru; Francis Klum: Kevin Smith; Terry Dodson; Mysterion: Christopher Yost; David Lopez

In-story information
- Alter ego: Daniel Berkhart; Francis Klum; Unknown
- Species: (Klum); Human Mutant
- Team affiliations: (Berkhart); Sinister Six
- Partnerships: (Berkhart); J. Jonah Jameson
- Notable aliases: (Berkhart); Jack O'Lantern; Mad Jack; (Unknown); Mysterion
- Abilities: (Klum); Teleportation; Telepathy; Telekinesis

After Quentin Beck, there have been several other characters who became his successors after taking his mantle as Mysterio. The second Mysterio (Daniel Berkhart) was created by Gerry Conway and Ross Andru and first appeared in The Amazing Spider-Man #141 (February 1975). The third Mysterio (Francis Klum) was created by Kevin Smith and Terry Dodson, and he first appeared in Spider-Man/Black Cat: The Evil That Men Do #1 (August 2002), and became Mysterio in the final issue of the miniseries. The fourth Mysterio (an unknown man named "Mysterion") was created by Christopher Yost and David Lopez and first appeared in Avenging Spider-Man #22 (June 2013).

=== Daniel Berkhart ===
After the original Mysterio seemingly dies in prison during an escape attempt, J. Jonah Jameson hires Daniel Berkhart, a stuntman who had previously worked with Beck and Beck's cellmate, to torment Spider-Man while claiming to be Mysterio's ghost. After he is defeated by Spider-Man, Berkhart explains that Beck had bequeathed some of his equipment to him after his "death", and he felt he owed it to Beck to get revenge. The story leaves it ambiguous whether there is any truth to Berkhart's story or if he was simply covering up Jameson's role in the affair. Berkhart is arrested, despite there being no witnesses to his harassing Spider-Man. He tries to force Jameson to get a lawyer for him by threatening to reveal his involvement to the police, a plot thread which is never resolved.

Later, after Beck's suicide, someone claiming to be Mysterio appears with the revised Sinister Six, making references to his "death", stating how after fighting Daredevil he had exited in a "most spectacular fashion". There was some confusion to this Mysterio's identity until the miniseries Spider-Man: The Mysterio Manifesto hinted that it was again Daniel Berkhart. This issue was not addressed again until a Mysterio briefly fought Spider-Man and was captured. Berkhart was later confirmed to be this second Mysterio by Quentin Beck. This Mysterio appeared during stories published between the original's death and subsequent return.

The Jack O'Lantern fought by Agent Venom claims to have killed off all of the surviving previous Jack O'Lanterns, leaving Berkhart's status uncertain.

=== Francis Klum ===
Francis Klum, a mutant with the ability to teleport, was sexually abused by his older brother Garrison (Mr. Brownstone) and forced to use his powers to assist Garrison's illegal activity as a heroin dealer. When Garrison dosed the Black Cat with heroin and attempted to rape her, Francis decided to stop his brother's cruelty for good, teleporting within and blowing up Garrison's body.

Eventually learning the details of Francis' abusive relationship with Garrison and his role in his brother's death, Felicia nearly convinced Francis to turn himself into the authorities; but Spider-Man, believing that Francis was trying to throw Black Cat from the bridge on which they were talking, brutally attacked Klum. Believing that Felicia set him up, he fell from the bridge, teleported in mid-fall and sustained severe physical injuries, losing his left leg below the knee.

Hungry for revenge against Spider-Man, he contacted the Kingpin and purchased the paraphernalia of the currently-deceased Mysterio (Quentin Beck). He reasoned that by using an old enemy's costume, he could put Spider-Man off-guard; Spider-Man would assume he knew who he was dealing with until Klum demonstrated his powers and it was too late for the wall-crawler to do anything about it.

However, Klum's plans to kill Spider-Man at Midtown High were interrupted when he was stabbed in the chest by school nurse Miss Arrow's stingers after an altercation with the other two Mysterios (Quentin Beck having returned from the dead). Klum teleported to safety, although Arrow (who was later revealed to be Ero, a being composed of hundreds of spiders) would later state that her stingers were fatal to anyone except Spider-Man.

Klum later died from his wounds as revealed in the "Dead No More: The Clone Conspiracy" storyline, but was resurrected in a cloned body (with his soul intact) by Ben Reilly. He died again soon after from cell degeneration.

=== Mysterion ===
An unknown African American individual purchases the suit of Mysterio from Roderick Kingsley and calls himself Mysterion. He fights the Superior Spider-Man (Doctor Octopus's mind in Spider-Man's body) and the Punisher. The Superior Spider-Man captures Mysterion and places him in containment with Sandman, Electro, and Chameleon in his hidden underwater lab. He is later forcibly put under mind control by the Superior Spider-Man and forced to join his Superior Six superhero team. Mysterion escapes with the other members after being freed from the Superior Spider-Man's influence.

== Powers and abilities ==
Mysterio does not possess superhuman abilities. He is an expert designer of special effects devices and stage illusions, a master hypnotist and magician and an amateur chemist and roboticist. He has extensive knowledge of hand-to-hand combat techniques learned as a stuntman, allowing him to engage in combat with Spider-Man despite his foe's superior physical abilities and using his skills at misdirection as a further method of self-defense.

=== Equipment ===
Mysterio's suit includes many devices to aid him. His helmet is made of one-way plexiglass, meaning he can see out but no one can see in. The helmet also includes an air supply to protect him from his own gases, sonar to navigate within his mist cloak and a holographic projector to create 3D illusions. His boots contain magnetic coil springs which allow him impressive leaps as well as the ability to cling to surfaces. Mysterio's costume contains nozzles in the boots and wrists that can release a constant stream of smoke that shields his movements. He can mix other chemicals into this smokescreen for various effects, including a gas that dulls and inhibits Spider-Man's spider-sense, a gas that causes paralysis for 30 minutes, an abrasive that eats away Spider-Man's webbing, hypnogens that make those around him more susceptible to his will and hallucinogens to cause vivid hallucinations. A combination of the hypnogens and hallucinogens, along with his holographic projectors, are how Mysterio achieves most of his illusions. The costume sometimes also includes offensive weaponry, such as lasers or knockout gas nozzles in the eye emblems on his shoulders, or electric coils within his cape to electrocute those who touch it.

== Other versions ==
=== Amazing Spider-Man: Renew Your Vows ===
An alternate universe version of Mysterio from Earth-1811 appears in Amazing Spider-Man: Renew Your Vows. This version is a member of Regent's Sinister Six.

=== Earth-31250 ===
An alternate universe version of Mysterio from Earth-31250 appears in the series Spider-Society as a member of the Sinister Squadron. This version has a fiery head and hands.

=== Marvel 1602 ===
An alternate universe version of Mysterio from Earth-311 appears in Marvel 1602. This version is a member of the Sinister Sextet who is also known as Magus.

=== Marvel Noir ===
An alternate universe version of Mysterio from Earth-90214 appears in Marvel Noir. This version is a stage magician also known as "The Magnificent Mysterio".

=== Marvel Zombies ===
A zombified alternate universe version of Mysterio from Earth-2149 appears in Marvel Zombies.

=== Spider-Gwen ===
An alternate universe version of Mysterio from Earth-65 appears in Spider-Gwen. This version is the founder of the theme park "The Cursed Carnival of Mysterio". After the park shut down, Mysterio remained in the area and used his illusions to scare outsiders away from the area.

=== Spider-Man: Fake Red ===
An alternate universe version of Mysterio from Earth-19759 appears in Spider-Man: Fake Red. This version uncovered Peter Parker's secret identity and adapted his illusions to counter him accordingly. However, Peter is possessed by a symbiote while powerless rock climber Yu Onomae assumes the Spider-Man identity. After being defeated by the latter, Mysterio bonds with the symbiote and becomes Venom, only to be defeated by Peter and Yu.

=== Spider-Man: Reign ===
An alternate universe version of Mysterio from Earth-70237 appears in Spider-Man: Reign.

=== Spider-Verse ===
Several alternate universe versions of Mysterio appear in Spider-Verse.

- The Mysterio of Earth-14512 appears in Edge of Spider-Verse #5. This version is a member of an illegal biological enhancement ring and an enemy of SP//dr who pilots an enormous flying orb.
- The Mysterio of Earth-803 appears in Spider-Verse #1. This version is a member of the Six Men of Sinestry and enemy of Lady Spider.

=== Ultimate Marvel ===
An alternate universe version of Mysterio from Earth-1610 appears in the Ultimate Marvel universe. This version is later revealed to be a series of robotic avatars created by the Mysterio of Earth-616 that serves as a probe for him.

=== Ultimate Universe ===
An alternate universe version of Mysterio from Earth-6160 appears in Ultimate Spider-Man. This version is a lieutenant of Wilson Fisk who controls Brooklyn on his behalf and later joins his Sinister Six to combat the Green Goblin and Spider-Man.

"Mysterio" is later revealed to be a moniker shared by five individuals who derive their powers from a magical amulet, alternate between each other on a weekly basis, and are aware of the Maker tampering with their world. At present, Gwen Stacy, Quentin Beck, Robbie Robertson, James Wesley, and Mister Negative's sister Aihan are among the group's ranks, while Gwen's father George Stacy appears as a previous member.

=== Wolverine: Old Man Logan ===
An alternate universe version of Mysterio from Earth-807128 appears in Wolverine: Old Man Logan. This version tricked Logan into murdering the X-Men.

== Reception ==
=== Accolades ===
- In 2009, IGN ranked Mysterio 85th in their "Top 100 Comic Book Villains.
- In 2014, IGN ranked Mysterio 13th in their "Top 25 Spider-Man Villains" list.
- In 2019, CBR.com ranked Mysterio 16th in their "25 Deadliest Spider-Man Villains" list.
- In 2021, Screen Rant included Mysterio in their "10 Best Spider-Man Comic Villains" list.
- In 2022, The A.V. Club ranked Mysterio 15th in their "28 best Marvel villains" list.
- In 2022, Newsarama ranked Mysterio 9th in their "Best Daredevil villains of all time" list.
- In 2022, Screen Rant included Mysterio in their "Marvel: The 10 Most Dangerous Villains Without Superpowers" list and in their "15 Most Powerful Daredevil Villains" list.

== In other media ==
=== Television ===
- Quentin Beck / Mysterio appears in Spider-Man (1967), voiced by Chris Wiggins.
- Quentin Beck / Mysterio appears in Spider-Man (1981) episode "The Pied Piper of New York Town", voiced by Michael Rye.
- Quentin Beck / Mysterio appears in the Spider-Man and His Amazing Friends (1981) episode "Spidey Goes Hollywood", voiced by Peter Cullen.
- Quentin Beck / Mysterio appears in Spider-Man: The Animated Series (1994) voiced by Gregg Berger. This version was a former special effects crew member who blames Spider-Man for getting him arrested. After battling Spider-Man several times, with some seeing him join the Kingpin's Insidious Six, Mysterio eventually joins forces with Spider-Man to save Mary Jane Watson from Mysterio's lover Miranda Wilson, an actress who had been mortally wounded during Mysterio's first fight with Spider-Man, saved by the former's technology, and intended to use it to switch bodies with Watson. When Mysterio reveals his machinery is incapable of doing so, a devastated Wilson sets the studio to self-destruct. Though Spider-Man and Watson escape, Mysterio stays behind to be with Wilson and they are both killed in the explosion.
- Quentin Beck / Mysterio appears in The Spectacular Spider-Man, voiced by Xander Berkeley. This version was a film special effects expert and stuntman who initially works for the Chameleon before breaking off to become Mysterio and join the Master Planner's Sinister Six.
- Quentin Beck / Mysterio appears in the Ultimate Spider-Man episode "The Moon Knight Before Christmas", voiced by Paul Scheer. This version is a former stage magician and an old enemy of Spider-Man who was presumed dead after falling off the Brooklyn Bridge sometime prior to the series, though his body was never found. Following the incident, Spider-Man gave his helmet to Doctor Strange for safekeeping. However, Beck's daughter Frances Beck (voiced by Mary Kate Wiles), emerges in the present to steal Quentin's helmet and use it to exact revenge on Spider-Man as the new Mysterio, only to run afoul of Moon Knight and discover that her father's soul was trapped within the helmet after he made a deal with Dormammu. After Spider-Man and Moon Knight enter the helmet and discover what happened to Quentin, they free the Becks and spend Christmas Eve together.
- Quentin Beck / Mysterio appears in Spider-Man (2017) episode "Bring on the Bad Guys" Pt. 2, voiced by Crispin Freeman. This version is a failed stage magician.

=== Film ===
- Storyboard artist Jeffrey Henderson, who worked on the cancelled Spider-Man 4, stated in 2016 that Bruce Campbell was planned to appear as Mysterio in the film's opening montage of Spider-Man defeating several minor villains.
- Two alternate universe versions of Mysterio, "Mooseterio" and "Missterio", make non-speaking cameo appearances in Spider-Man: Across the Spider-Verse as prisoners of the Spider-Society.

=== Marvel Cinematic Universe ===
Quentin Beck / Mysterio appears in media set in the Marvel Cinematic Universe (MCU), portrayed by Jake Gyllenhaal.

- Introduced in the film Spider-Man: Far From Home (2019), this version is a former Stark Industries scientist who developed holographic technology that Tony Stark showcased in the film Captain America: Civil War (2016) and dubbed B.A.R.F. (Binary Augmented Retro-Framing). After losing his job due to mental instability, the humiliated scientist recruited other embittered ex-Stark employees to take advantage of Stark's death in Avengers: Endgame (2019). To this end, they manufactured the Elementals using drones equipped with the scientist's technology and fabricated a backstory claiming the entities and himself were from another universe. To legitimize himself as an "Avengers-level" hero, Beck joins forces with an unknowing Talos disguised as Nick Fury and Spider-Man—whose classmates gave Beck the "Mysterio" moniker—to "defeat" the Elementals around the world while bonding with the latter to gain his trust and acquire a device Talos gave him on Stark's behalf called E.D.I.T.H.. Despite successfully getting it, he learns Spider-Man broke off a holographic projector from one of the drones and reluctantly decides to kill him along with anyone who could potentially reveal his secret. Using a fight in London between his holographic persona and an Elemental Fusion monster as a distraction, Beck attempts to act on this plan but is foiled when Spider-Man destroys his drones and retrieves E.D.I.T.H. from him. During the fight, Beck is accidentally shot and killed by one of the drones. Unbeknownst to Spider-Man, Mysterio had planned for his defeat and has doctored footage of the fight sent to the media, exposing Spider-Man's identity while framing him for murder and ensuring that the public remembers Beck as a hero.
- Beck reappears in the film Spider-Man: No Way Home (2021), portrayed again by Gyllenhaal via archive footage. Though Spider-Man's lawyer Matt Murdock convinces law enforcement to drop the murder charges against him, the former and his friends struggle with negative publicity from the press, J. Jonah Jameson, and people who believe Beck was a hero, resulting in Spider-Man seeking Stephen Strange's help to make the world forget his identity.
- The full footage of Beck exposing Spider-Man's secret identity reappears in the web series The Daily Bugle, with Gyllenhaal reprising his role via archive footage.
- An alternate universe variant of Beck appears in the What If...? episode "What If... the Emergence Destroyed the Earth?", voiced by Alejandro Saab. Years after the Earth was destroyed during the Emergence, this version spent the intervening decades using Stark Industries technology to build an army of drones called the Iron Federation, gaining control of the Vision to lead them, and utilizing nanites to better control his illusions. Due to the nanites gradually killing him however, he attempts to manipulate Riri Williams into helping him merge with Vision. However, the Watcher breaks his oath and motivates Williams to defeat Beck.

=== Video games ===
- Quentin Beck / Mysterio appears in Questprobe featuring Spider-Man; The Amazing Spider-Man (Game Boy 1990) and its sequel The Amazing Spider-Man 2 (1992); the Sega CD version of Spider-Man vs. The Kingpin; Spider-Man: Mysterio's Menace; The Amazing Spider-Man (Oxford Digital Enterprises 1990); both the Super NES and Sega Genesis versions of Spider-Man (1995); The Amazing Spider-Man: Lethal Foes; and Spider-Man 2: The Sinister Six.
- Quentin Beck / Mysterio appears in Spider-Man: Return of the Sinister Six, voiced by Dan Kamin.
- Quentin Beck / Mysterio appears in Spider-Man (2000), voiced by Daran Norris.
- Quentin Beck / Mysterio appears as a boss in Spider-Man 2 (2004), voiced by James Arnold Taylor.
  - In the home console versions, Beck first appears as a former special effects artist who seeks to prove that Spider-Man is a fraud by challenging him to a series of "games", which he ultimately loses. Humiliated and in trouble with the police because his games allowed several criminals to escape, Beck assumes the identity of Mysterio, an alien who has come to conquer New York City with his army of robots. However, Spider-Man foils his schemes and reveals his charade. Later, while trying to rob a convenience store, Mysterio is easily defeated by Spider-Man and unmasked, leading to his arrest.
  - In the PC version, Mysterio is hired by Doctor Octopus to distract Spider-Man by creating a massive illusion of a floating New York. Although he is eventually defeated by the web-slinger, he avoids capture via an illusion of himself.
  - In the PSP version, after being accidentally broken out of prison by the Rhino, Mysterio takes hostages, but is eventually defeated by Spider-Man and arrested.
- Quentin Beck / Mysterio appears as a mini-boss in Marvel: Ultimate Alliance, voiced again by James Arnold Taylor. This version is a member of Doctor Doom's Masters of Evil.
- Quentin Beck / Mysterio appears as the final boss of Spider-Man: Friend or Foe, voiced by Robin Atkin Downes. He combines shards from the meteor that originally brought the Venom symbiote to Earth with his nanotechnology and hard-light holograms to create an army of Perpetual Holographic Avatar Nano-Tech Offensive Monsters (P.H.A.N.T.O.M.s). To ensure he has enough shards to strengthen his P.H.A.N.T.O.M.s and eventually take over the world, he also kidnaps and brainwashes other supervillains, whom he sends across the globe to retrieve more shards. After Spider-Man frees the villains from his control, they join forces with him to defeat Mysterio and his P.H.A.N.T.O.M.s.
- Quentin Beck / Mysterio appears as an assist character in the PS2 and PSP versions of Spider-Man: Web of Shadows, voiced by Greg Baldwin.
- Quentin Beck / Mysterio appears as the final boss of Spider-Man: Shattered Dimensions, voiced by David Kaye. He attempts to steal an artifact called the Tablet of Order and Chaos and sell it on the black market, but Spider-Man arrives to stop him. After a brief battle between the two, the tablet is shattered into 17 fragments, most of which get sent to three alternate realities. After escaping with one, Mysterio discovers it grants him real magic powers. While seeking out the other fragments, he takes Madame Web hostage and forces Spider-Man and three of his alternate counterparts to find them. Once they do so, Mysterio absorbs the recreated tablet and becomes a god-like being before destroying reality so he can recreate it in his image. However, he inadvertently allows Madame Web to bring the four Spider-Men together and defeat him; de-powering him and restoring reality before his universe's Spider-Man takes Mysterio to prison.
- Quentin Beck / Mysterio appears in Marvel Super Hero Squad Online, voiced by Dave Boat.
- Quentin Beck / Mysterio appears as a playable character in Lego Marvel Super Heroes, voiced by David Sobolov.
- Quentin Beck / Mysterio appears as the final boss of Disney Infinity 2.0, voiced again by David Kaye.
- Quentin Beck / Mysterio appears as a boss in Marvel: Avengers Alliance, voiced again by David Kaye.
- Multiple alternate reality versions of Mysterio appear as bosses in Spider-Man Unlimited, voiced by Fred Tatasciore. They appear as members of a multiversal Sinister Six.
- Quentin Beck / Mysterio makes a cameo appearance in the end credits of Disney Infinity 3.0, voiced again by David Kaye.
- Quentin Beck / Mysterio appears as a boss in Marvel: Avengers Alliance 2.
- Mysterio appears as a playable character in Marvel: Future Fight.
- Quentin Beck / Mysterio appears as a playable character in Lego Marvel Super Heroes 2.
- Quentin Beck / Mysterio appears in Marvel Strike Force as a member of the Sinister Six.
- Quentin Beck / Mysterio, based on the Marvel Cinematic Universe (MCU) incarnation, appears as a playable character in Marvel Puzzle Quest.
- Quentin Beck / Mysterio appears as a boss in Marvel Ultimate Alliance 3: The Black Order, voiced again by David Kaye. This version is a member of the Sinister Six.
- Quentin Beck / Mysterio appears in Marvel Snap.
- Quentin Beck / Mysterio appears as a boss in Marvel's Spider-Man 2 (2023), voiced by Noshir Dalal. This version has reformed and used his expertise to open virtual reality entertainment venues across New York called "Mysteriums" with business partner Betsy Schneider and technologist Cole Wittman. However, Miles Morales discovers that the Mysteriums are trapping people in life-threatening illusions. Additionally, Schneider claims Beck might be returning to his criminal ways. After closing down the Mysteriums, Morales foils Schneider and Whittman's attempt to frame Beck for their scheme to steal the Mysterium users' personal information and sees the women arrested.

=== Merchandise ===
- Mysterio received two action figures produced by Toy Biz under their Spider-Man: The Animated Series and Spider-Man Classics lines. The Toy Biz Mysterio was also repainted for the first wave of Spider-Man figures by Hasbro.
- Mysterio has been reproduced as a mini-bust and as a 13-inch (330 mm) statue by Bowen Designs. He has likewise been crafted as a mini-bust by Art Asylum as part of their Rogues Gallery line. He also makes up 1/7th of the "Sinister Six" statue set from Diamond Select.
- Hasbro has made various action figures of Mysterio over the years, including a Spider-Man 2 game version of Mysterio for their Spider-Man 3 movie figures series. In 2018, a new Marvel Legends figure of the character was released, based on his comic book version. Two versions of this figure was released, one featuring a green translucent head and a variant featuring a white translucent head. In 2019, another Marvel Legends figure was released based on his appearance in Spider-Man: Far From Home.
