= Spider-Man: The Animated Series =

American superhero animated television series

- Genre: Superhero
- Based on: Spider-Man by: Stan Lee; Steve Ditko
- Written by: John Semper
- Voices of: Christopher Daniel Barnes; Edward Asner; Jennifer Hale; Saratoga Ballantine; Linda Gary; Rodney Saulsberry; Joseph Campanella; Gary Imhoff; Neil Ross; Roscoe Lee Browne; Efrem Zimbalist Jr.; Hank Azaria; Mark Hamill; Julie Bennett
- Theme music composer: Kussa Mahchi; Jeremy Sweet; Shuki Levy; Joe Perry
- Composers: Shuki Levy; Kussa Mahchi; Udi Harpaz; David Ari Leon
- Country of origin: United States
- Original language: English
- No. of seasons: 5
- No. of episodes: 65 (list of episodes)

Production
- Executive producers: Avi Arad; Stan Lee
- Producers: John Semper; Bob Richardson
- Running time: 21 minutes
- Production companies: Marvel Entertainment Group; Marvel Films; TMS-Kyokuichi Corporation (Note: Credited as Tokyo Movie Shinsha until season 2); Saban Entertainment (seasons 4–5)

Original release
- Network: Fox Kids Network
- Release: November 19, 1994 – January 31, 1998

Related
- X-Men: The Animated Series; X-Men '97

Spider-Man: The Animated Series, also known as Spider-Man, is an American superhero animated television series based on the Marvel Comics character of the same name. The series aired on the Fox Kids Network from November 19, 1994, to January 31, 1998, and later aired in reruns on Toon Disney's Jetix block and on Disney XD. The series was produced by Marvel Films, and animated by TMS-Kyokuichi.

The series finale was the first to introduce the "Spider-Verse" storyline, also known as the "Spider-Man Multiverse", which later inspired similar narratives in various Spider-Man comics, cartoons, and films in the early 21st century. People magazine described the show as one of the best animated comic book adaptations of all time. The show was presented in Dolby Surround for Fox Kids.

== Synopsis ==
The series follows Peter Parker, a college student at Empire State University who struggles to balance his responsibilities as the costumed hero Spider-Man with the problems of his personal life. In addition to fighting crime, Peter must navigate his romantic affections for love interests Felicia Hardy and Mary Jane Watson; maintain his friendship with Harry Osborn; focus on his academic performance as Dr. Curt Connors' student; and help to support his Aunt May after the death of his Uncle Ben by working as a freelance photographer for the Daily Bugle. The Bugle is owned by loudmouth publisher J. Jonah Jameson, who often uses Peter's pictures of his alter-ego to discredit and carry out a smear campaign against Spider-Man. Peter's peers at ESU include football star Flash Thompson, popular barista Liz Allan, scientific genius Debra Whitman, and research rival Michael Morbius.

As Spider-Man, Peter faces various supervillains who threaten New York City, including criminal masterminds such as the Kingpin and the Hobgoblin, scientific mishaps like Doctor Octopus and the Green Goblin, and the extraterrestrial symbiotes Venom and Carnage. Spider-Man is occasionally aided in his fight against crime by other superheroes, including the X-Men, the Punisher, Blade, Doctor Strange, Daredevil, Iron Man, Captain America, and the Fantastic Four.

=== Adaptations ===
A large number of storylines and events from the comics are loosely adapted in the series, such as:

==== Season 1 ====
- The first episode, "Night of the Lizard", is loosely based on the comic story "Face-to-Face with... the Lizard!" from The Amazing Spider-Man #6 (November 1963).
- The episode "The Spider Slayer" is loosely based on the comic story "Captured by J. Jonah Jameson!" from The Amazing Spider-Man #25 (June 1965), with the subplot of Flash Thompson dressing up as Spider-Man to scare Peter Parker being taken from "Marked for Destruction by Dr. Doom!" from The Amazing Spider-Man #5 (October 1963).
- The episode "Return of the Spider Slayer" borrows elements from the comic books including the way Alistair Smythe treated Spider-Man and Jameson in a very similar way to how his father Spencer Smythe treated them in the comic story "24 Hours till Doomsday!" in The Amazing Spider-Man #192 (May 1979), the three spider slayers are from "Invasion of the Spider Slayers Part 5: Arachnophobia Too!" from The Amazing Spider-Man #372 (January 1993) and Mary Jane uses her famous line from her first comic appearance: "Face it, Tiger. You just hit the jackpot", in the comic story "The Birth of a Super-Hero!" from The Amazing Spider-Man #42 (November 1966).
- The episode "Doctor Octopus: Armed and Dangerous" is loosely based on the comic story "Spider-Man Versus Doctor Octopus" from The Amazing Spider-Man #3 (July 1963).
- The episode "The Menace of Mysterio" is loosely based on the comic story "The Menace of... Mysterio!" from The Amazing Spider-Man #13 (June 1964).
- The episode "The Sting of the Scorpion" is based on the comic story "Spidey Strikes Back!" / "The Coming of the Scorpion! OR: Spidey Battles Scorpey!" in The Amazing Spider-Man #19-20 (December 1964–January 1965).
- The episode "Kraven the Hunter" is loosely adapted from the comic story of the same name from The Amazing Spider-Man #15 (August 1964).
- The dream sequence from the episode "The Alien Costume, Part One" where the symbiote and the Spider-Man costume fight over Peter Parker is adapted from the comic story "The Sinister Secret of Spider-Man's New Costume!" from The Amazing Spider-Man #258 (November 1984).
- The end of the episode "The Alien Costume, Part Two" where Spider-Man uses the bell to get free from the symbiote is adapted from the comic story "'Til Death Do Us Part!" from Web of Spider-Man #1 (April 1985).
- The beginning of the episode "The Alien Costume, Part Three" where Eddie Brock has a wall covered with newspaper clippings of Spider-Man and turns into Venom swearing vengeance on Spider-Man is adapted from the comic story "Chance Encounter" from The Amazing Spider-Man #298 (March 1988), while the scene where Eddie menaces Peter at Aunt May's home is adapted from the story "The Sand and the Fury" from The Amazing Spider-Man #317 (July 1989).
- "The Hobgoblin" two-parter is loosely adapted from the comic stories "Secrets!" / "Confessions!" / "Endings!" from The Amazing Spider-Man #249-251 (February–April 1984).
- The episode "Day of the Chameleon" is loosely adapted from the comic story "Spider-Man Vs. the Chameleon!" from The Amazing Spider-Man #1 (March 1963).

==== Season 2 ====
- The episode "The Insidious Six" "and "Battle of the Insidious Six" are both based on the comic story "The Sinister Six!" from The Amazing Spider-Man Annual #1 (October 1964).
- In "Battle of the Insidious Six" the scene where Peter is unmasked by the Insidious Six, after Aunt May is kidnapped by them, but they believe he was just standing in for the real Spider-Man, is from the comic story "Unmasked By Doctor Octopus!" from Amazing Spider-Man #12 (May 1964) but instead of Aunt May, it's Betty Brant who is kidnapped by Doctor Octopus by himself.
- The episode "Hydro-Man" is based on the comic story "The Coming of Hydroman!" from The Amazing Spider-Man #212 (January 1981).
- The episodes "The Mutant Agenda" and "Mutants' Revenge" are based on Spider-Man: The Mutant Agenda #1-3 (March–May 1994).
- The episodes "Morbius" and "Enter the Punisher" are both based on the comic stories "The Spider or the Man?" / "A Monster Called Morbius!" / "Vampire at Large!" from The Amazing Spider-Man #100-102 (September–November 1971). The Man-Spider plot is loosely adapted from "Fast Descent into Hell!" / "To Sacrifice My Soul..." from Marvel Fanfare #1-2 (March–May 1982).
- "Enter the Punisher" is also based on the comic story "The Punisher Strikes Twice!" from The Amazing Spider-Man #129 (February 1974).
- The episode "Tablet of Time" is based on the comic story "The Web Closes!" from The Amazing Spider-Man #73 (June 1969) with Smythe's robot originating from "Invasion of the Spider Slayers Part 4: One Clue Over The Cuckoo's Nest" from The Amazing Spider-Man #371 (December 1992).
- The episode "Ravages of Time" is based on the comic stories "If This Be Bedlam!" / "Death Without Warning!" from The Amazing Spider-Man #74-75 (July–August 1969) and "Lifetheft Part One: The Wings of Age" / "Lifetheft Part Two: The Thief of Years" / "Lifetheft Part Three: The Sadness of Truth" from The Amazing Spider-Man #386-388 (February–April 1994).
- The episode "Shriek of the Vulture" is based on the comic stories "Duel to the Death with the Vulture!" from The Amazing Spider-Man #2 (May 1963) and "The Wings of Age!" from The Amazing Spider-Man #386 (February 1994).
- The episode "The Final Nightmare" is loosely based on "The Thief of Years" from The Amazing Spider-Man #387 (March 1994).

==== Season 3 ====
- The episode "Make a Wish" is based on the comic stories "Doc Ock Wins!" from The Amazing Spider-Man #55 (December 1967) and "The Kid Who Collects Spider-Man!" from The Amazing Spider-Man #248 (January 1984). A flashback to Spider-Man's origin is shown and is adapted from the comic story "Spider-Man!" from Amazing Fantasy #15.
- The episode "Attack of the Octobot" is based on the comic stories "Disaster!" from The Amazing Spider-Man #56 (January 1968) and "The Kid Who Collects Spider-Man!" from The Amazing Spider-Man #248 (January 1984).
- The episode "Rocket Racer" is based on the comic stories "The Fiend from the Fire!" from Amazing Spider-Man #172 (September 1977) and "The Rocket Racer's Back in Town!" / "...And Where the Big Wheel Stops, Nobody Knows!" from The Amazing Spider-Man #182-183 (July–August 1978).
- The episode "The Ultimate Slayer" is loosely based on the comic story "Invasion of the Spider Slayers Part 6: The Bedlam Perspective" from The Amazing Spider-Man #373 (January 1993).
- The episode "Tombstone" is loosely based on the comic stories "Grave Memory" from The Spectacular Spider-Man #139 (June 1988) and "Will!" from The Spectacular Spider-Man #142 (September 1988).
- The episode "Venom Returns" is blended from several different comics including "Hearts and Powers" / "Gun From the Heart" from The Amazing Spider-Man #344-345 (February–March 1991) and "Toy Death!" from The Amazing Spider-Man #359 (February 1992).
- The episode "Carnage" is loosely based on the comic stories "Savage Genesis" / "Savage Alliance" / "Savage Grace!" from The Amazing Spider-Man #361-363 (April–June 1992).
- The episode "The Spot" is based on the comic story "True Confessions!" / "Spider on the Spot!" from Peter Parker, the Spectacular Spider-Man #98-99 (January–February 1985).
- The episode "Goblin War!" is based on the comic story "The Goblin War" from The Amazing Spider-Man #312 (February 1989).
- The episode "Turning Point" is based on the comic stories "How Green Was My Goblin!" from The Amazing Spider-Man #39 (August 1966) and "The Night Gwen Stacy Died" / "The Goblin's Last Stand!" from The Amazing Spider-Man #121-122 (June–July 1973).

==== Season 4 ====
- The episode "Guilty" is based on "Guilty!" / "Lock-Up" from The Spectacular Spider-Man #150-151 (May–June 1989) and "Crash Out!" from The Spectacular Spider-Man #155 (October 1989).
- The episode "The Black Cat" is based on "Never Let the Black Cat Cross Your Path!" from The Amazing Spider-Man #194 (July 1979).
- The episode "The Return of the Green Goblin" is based on "The Green Goblin Lives Again!" / "The Green Goblin Strikes!" from The Amazing Spider-Man #136-137 (September–October 1974).

==== Season 5 ====
- The episode "The Wedding" is loosely based on "The Wedding" from The Amazing Spider-Man Annual #21 (September 1987).
- The "Six Forgotten Warriors" saga is loosely based on "The Parents of Peter Parker!" from The Amazing Spider-Man Annual #5 (November 1968) and "The Assassin-Nation Plot" storyline from The Amazing Spider-Man #320-325 (September 1989–November 1989).
- The "Secret Wars" trilogy adapts the 1984 limited series Marvel Super Heroes Secret Wars (May 1984–April 1985).
- The "Spider Wars" duology adapts the second "Clone Saga" (October 1994–December 1996). John Semper would later claim that this arc inspired Dan Slott's "Spider-Verse" storyline.

== Episodes ==
Season	Story arc	Episodes		Originally released	
Season	Story arc	Episodes		First released	Last released
1	—	13		November 19, 1994	June 11, 1995
2	Neogenic Nightmare	14		September 9, 1995	February 24, 1996
3	The Sins of the Fathers	14		April 27, 1996	November 23, 1996
4	Partners In Danger	11		February 1, 1997	August 2, 1997
5	The Wedding	13	1	September 12, 1997	
5	Six Forgotten Warriors	13	5	September 19, 1997	October 17, 1997
5	The Return of Hydro-Man	13	2	October 24, 1997	October 31, 1997
5	Secret Wars	13	3	November 7, 1997	November 21, 1997
5	Spider Wars	13	2	January 31, 1998	

== Cast and characters ==
=== Main voice cast ===
- Christopher Daniel Barnes – Peter Parker / Spider-Man
- Edward Asner – J. Jonah Jameson
- Jennifer Hale – Felicia Hardy / Black Cat
- Saratoga Ballantine – Mary Jane Watson
- Linda Gary (seasons 1–3) & Julie Bennett (seasons 4–5) – May Parker
- Rodney Saulsberry – Joseph "Robbie" Robertson
- Joseph Campanella – Dr. Curt Connors / Lizard
- Gary Imhoff – Harry Osborn / Green Goblin
- Neil Ross – Norman Osborn / Green Goblin
- Roscoe Lee Browne – Wilson Fisk / Kingpin
- Efrem Zimbalist Jr. – Dr. Otto Octavius / Doctor Octopus
- Hank Azaria – Eddie Brock / Venom
- Mark Hamill – Jason Philips / Hobgoblin

== Production ==
While Fox Kids' X-Men animated series was being produced by Saban, Spider-Man was produced by the newly formed Marvel Films Animation; it was the only series that in-house studio produced, but was animated by TMS-Kyokuchi Corporation. The series ran for 65 episodes and was the longest-running Spider-Man animated series by episode count until Ultimate Spider-Man surpassed its record with 104 episodes.

For years, it was believed that the show had been heavily censored. In some episodes, realistic guns were depicted, but only in flashbacks, such as the showing of guns being fired during a flashback about the Punisher's origins where his wife and children were killed in the crossfire during a crime. Rules for the production of the show included no punching, throwing through glass, putting children in jeopardy or vampires as well as no usage of the word sinister. In November 2014 podcasts, Semper clarified that the show was not censored more than any other show at the time and that every time this has been brought up to him, he feels it has been blown out of proportion. Semper also admitted that the decision for Spider-Man not to use his fists was his own idea, because although the censors probably would have allowed it, Semper believed that Spider-Man should use more tactical methods and didn't want to teach children, the main target audience of the show, to solve problems through simple violence. Semper said that Marvel had no creative control on the TV series as the company was going through a tough time and was close to bankruptcy. In addition, Semper stated that Stan Lee had influence on the show in the first thirteen episodes.

=== Writing staff ===
Producer John Semper was the primary credited writer on the show, receiving some sort of writing credit (usually a story, co-story or co-writing credit) on 60 of the 65 produced episodes. He wrote 8 episodes solo; many of his story credits were actually adaptations of previously published comic book stories. Mark Hoffmeier was a frequent contributor, receiving credits on 16 episodes, while Stan Berkowitz was credited on 9. Many of the other series writers had previously worked on Batman: The Animated Series, including Brynne Stephens, Marv Wolfman, Gerry Conway, Marty Isenberg and Robert N. Skir, Len Wein, and Sean Catherine Derek.

Semper watched previous Spider-Man adaptations for inspiration, but he was not impressed by most of them. The only previous adaptation that impressed him was the live-action Japanese Spider-Man (1978), which he thought was a "great" show and "goofy fun". Japanese Spider-Man's giant mecha robot influenced the final multi-part parallel universe arc where Spider-Man's wealthy alter-ego has a robot.

=== Animation ===
To reproduce New York City's appearance, background illustrators undertook a large amount of visual research by using photo archives from above New York, particularly rooftops. Maps were consulted for references and buildings were faithfully reproduced. The animation cels depicting Manhattan's Pan Am Building (recently renamed the MetLife Building) were scrapped after being complete because the California-based art staff learned the Midtown landmark had been given a new sign more than a year earlier. The animation staff were directed to populate the city with cars and crowds on the street level. Semper believed that was one of the limitations of earlier Spider-Man animated projects. Originally, Marvel Films planned to make the backgrounds completely CGI while Spider-Man swung around New York, yet due to budget constraints were forced to use traditional cel based animation while occasionally using CGI backgrounds by video game developer Kronos Digital Entertainment. Reuse of animation became more common as the series progressed, which also included reuse of animation involving a character speaking (these scenes were sometimes slowed down in order to better match the actor's voice to the animation).

=== Music ===
Marvel outsourced the show's music to Saban Entertainment, who were also responsible for the music in the concurrent X-Men cartoon airing on Fox Kids. Shuki Levy, Haim Saban and Udi Harpaz are credited as composers of the orchestral background score. In the closing credits, Haim Saban was credited under the alias "Kussa Mahchi", which he also used in the credits of other shows such as Mighty Morphin Power Rangers, X-Men and the English dub of Dragon Ball Z. The background music was conducted with a live orchestra in Israel.

The theme for the series was written and performed by Joe Perry of the hard rock band Aerosmith (although it is sometimes credited to Levy and Saban). The theme song only came about after producer Avi Arad met Perry on a plane flight from New York to Los Angeles, with Perry telling Arad that he'd love to do the theme for a Spider-Man show. The theme was created midway through the production of the first season. A reason the show's producers were open to using an aggressive opening song like the one Perry came up with was since Saban had experienced success by using Ron Wasserman's rock/metal theme as the opening for Mighty Morphin Power Rangers in 1993, with the company having previously been hesitant to use music such as this for children's programming. Aerosmith were later referenced in a 1995 episode of the series titled "The Alien Costume, Part One", in which Peter briefly turns into a member of Aerosmith.

=== Rights ===
In January 1997, News Corporation's 20th Century Fox acquired the rights to the show and all of Marvel's other animation assets, via News Corporation's acquisition of Marvel's production partner New World International. News Corporation already had acquired a stake in New World International in July 1995, with the January 1997 transaction being a full buyout. That year, News Corporation and 20th Century Fox spun off Marvel's animation assets into their children's division Fox Family Worldwide. In September 1996, Saban Entertainment also merged with Fox's children division, with this deal giving the combined Fox Family Worldwide and Saban distribution rights over the Marvel animation catalog. During the late 1990s, the show was released onto VHS by Fox and Saban as a result of their ownership, and Saban's involvement with the production also increased during the fourth and fifth seasons. Their control over the show ended in October 2001, when Saban Entertainment and Fox Family Worldwide were sold to Disney, who themselves subsequently took over Marvel in 2009. The Fox Family Worldwide/Saban sale also included cable network the Fox Family Channel, which was renamed to ABC Family, and which started airing reruns of the series in the following years.

In 1998, Marvel sold the film rights for the Spider-Man IP to Sony. This deal gives Sony exclusive film and live action television rights to over 900 Spider-Man characters, including several characters created specifically for the 1994 Spider-Man animated series, and other pre-1999 Spider-Man cartoons.

== Merchandising ==
=== Comics ===
Similarly to X-Men: The Animated Series, the series inspired a number of comic books. The first one was Spider-Man Adventures, published for 15 issues between December 1994 and February 1996, which loosely adapted the plot from the series' episodes. It was followed by Adventures of Spider-Man, a 12-issue series with original stories, published from April 1996 to March 1997.

Additionally, Marvel published a second series inspired by the animated series titled Spider-Man Magazine, that went on for 19 issues from March 1994 to March 1997. Two special issues were also published in 1995.

A tie-in series titled Marvel Adventures went on for 18 issues from April 1997 to September 1998.

Bibliography

- Spider-Man Adventures (December 1994 to February 1996): the first 13 issues each adapted one episode from the first season, and the last two issues were original stories. Spider-Man Adventures #1–4 was later reprinted in Kellogg's Froot Loops Mini-Comics #1–4.
- The Adventures of Spider-Man (April 1996 to March 1997): featuring new stories based on the series. Adventures of Spider-Man was later reprinted in Spectacular Spider-Man (UK Magazine) #11–21 from August 1996 to May 1997.
- Marvel Adventures (April 1997 to September 1998): anthology featuring various animated versions of Marvel characters—Spider-Man only appeared sporadically.

=== Video games ===
A number of video games based on the series were also produced:

- Spider-Man Cartoon Maker for the PC (1995)
- Spider-Man (1995) for the Super NES and Genesis

Electronic versions of classic Spider-Man comics were released by Marvel that included narration by Christopher Daniel Barnes and featured animation and theme music from this series. Spider-Man novels inspired by selected episodes were also released. A wide variety of themed merchandise (lunch boxes, cereals, clothing, etc.) was produced. McDonald's produced a themed line of Happy Meal toys for the show.

=== Release availability ===
After the success of the Spider-Man films, the series began to air in reruns through its new owners, The Walt Disney Company. This show had been shown streaming entirety on Disney+ service since November 12, 2019.

== Home media ==
=== Region 1 ===
A single VHS volume containing the "Hobgoblin" two-part episode was released on July 2, 1997 by 20th Century Fox Home Entertainment.

From November 1996 until October 1999, Telegenic Entertainment released ten VHS volumes of the series in Canada. They were compilations that featured episodes edited into 70–80, 90-100 minute movies based on the particular story arc. The releases were "The Venom Saga", "Revenge of the Goblins", "Spider-Slayer", "Insidious Six", "Mutant Agenda", "Tablet of Time", "Neogenic Nightmare", "Forgotten Warriors", "The Sins of the Fathers" and "Secret Wars". The tapes also contained bonus episodes of other Marvel cartoons.

From April 2002 until June 2005, Buena Vista Home Entertainment released several VHS and DVD compilations of the series. The first BVHE release - "The Ultimate Villain Showdown" contained episodes 2-5 of the "Sins of the Father" arc (Season 3) and special features such as a bonus episode from the 1967 series. "The Return of the Green Goblin" contains episodes 12-14 of the "Sins of the Father" arc and the first episode of the "Partners in Danger" arc (Season 4) with special features including the eighth episode of the arc, while the DVD also included a bonus episode from the 1967 series. "Daredevil vs. Spider-Man" contains episodes 6-9 of the "Sins of the Father" arc with special features including a 1967 series episode featuring Kingpin while the DVD has a bonus episode from the second season of Fantastic Four that guest stars Daredevil. "Spider-Man vs. Doc Ock" contained a Season One episode and episodes 2, 3 and 5 of the "Partners in Danger" arc, with a 1967 series episode as an extra. The fifth BVHE release - "Spider-Man: The Venom Saga", contains the three-part "The Alien Costume" saga from Season 1 and Episodes 10-11 of "The Sins of the Fathers".

A compilation release containing "The Ultimate Villain Showdown", "The Return of the Green Goblin" and "Daredevil vs. Spider-Man" was also released.

=== Region 2 ===
Buena Vista Home Entertainment released the compilations on VHS and DVD in the United Kingdom and select other territories. While the main content was the same, they contained different bonus features from the North American release.

In April 2008, Liberation Entertainment secured the home media rights to select Marvel shows from Jetix Europe in select European territories, including Spider-Man. The company however shuttered their UK division at the end of October 2008, leaving releases of the show in limbo.

Clear Vision later took over rights in the UK, Sweden, and Germany and released the complete series in season sets. Season 1 on June 22, 2009, Season 2 on August 3, 2009, Season 3 on August 17, 2009, Season 4 on September 14, 2009 and Season 5 on October 19, 2009. The company followed this off with a complete series boxset released on November 11, 2011.

=== Other releases ===
- A Canadian DVD containing three episodes from the "Mutant Agenda" episodes. This is a reissue of the 1997 Marvel-New World/Telegenic VHS release (and it was mastered from one of those VHS releases); as a "Bonus" two episodes from the 1990s Iron Man TV series are included, just like on the VHS release. There are no audio/subtitle selections.
- Canadians also received another DVD release of the first season two-parter "The Hobgoblin". This was a re-release of the 1997 VHS release from Fox Video; the video quality of the episodes on the DVD is that of a VHS transfer. There are no bonus features or audio/subtitle selections on this DVD either.
- A VCD release by Magnavision Home Video.
- A boxed set of all the DVDs was released in Poland, simply entitled "Spider-Man: 5 DVD Set". The front of the box features the same graphics as "The Ultimate Villain Showdown". DVDs including random assortments of episodes were also distributed with various magazines, ranging from entire story arcs to two or three episodes per DVD.
- Several two-episode DVDs were released by Marvel in 2002 prior to the acquisition by Disney.
- 3 DVDs with 2 episodes each were released regionally for Serbia and Montenegro, Croatia, Slovenia, Bosnia and Herzegovina and Macedonia with Serbian, Croatian and Slovenian dubs on them in 2005.
- The entire first season was available on Xbox Live and iTunes through Disney XD.
- All five seasons are currently available for digital purchase on Vudu and Amazon under the title 'Marvel Comics Spider-Man'.
- The entire series was available on Disney+ but was subsequently removed. Later on May 2 it made its return to the service.
- There were also unlicensed DVDs that had The Adventure Continues on them that contained two episodes from most of the movies that were released by Marvel Films/New World Entertainment. For example, one was Spider-Man - Blade the Vampire Hunter which contained two episodes which were "Blade, the Vampire Hunter" and "The Immortal Vampire", a two-part story episode from the second season, making it like a movie based on the toy line, Spider-Man: Vampire Wars.
- In France, all episodes were released on DVD from local Editor TF1 video, but only with French tracks voices and no subtitles available.

Bootleg DVDs of the show have become popular among fans due to a lack of official DVD releases. The bootlegs feature all of the episodes but some of them have low video quality and watermarks. This is likely to change as the entire series becomes available in the UK. The series is currently the 9th most wanted unreleased DVD at TVShowsOnDVD.com.

== Legacy ==
=== Spider-Verse ===
The last two episodes of Spider-Man: The Animated Series, about multiple Spider-Man characters crossing dimensions to different universes, was the first Spider-Man story involving parallel universes. This inspired the Spider-Verse, which later appeared in various Spider-Man comics, cartoons and films in the early 21st century, the most notable of which being the animated Spider-Verse feature films produced by Sony Pictures Animation.

=== Spiritual successor and possible revival ===
On November 1, 2014, at the Comikaze Expo, where the show's 20th anniversary was celebrated, John Semper Jr. revealed that much of the cast and crew of Spider-Man, himself included, had agreed to reunite for a new crowdfunded series entitled "War of the Rocket Men". In addition, in late 2014, Semper Jr. started a website (cartoonspiderman.com) that features behind-the-scenes content, podcasts about the show, a link to the Facebook page that Semper regularly posts on and more. In April 2016, Semper's YouTube account posted a video in which he revealed that he had written a short story following up on the series, detailing Peter finding Mary Jane with Madame Web's help in a Victorian-age setting, referring to the story as "an autobiographical fan-fiction" in which he reminisced on what it was like writing the last episodes of the series, as well as detailing how Peter and Mary Jane would have been reunited, adding one could think of it as "the lost episode of Spider-Man: The Animated Series". Semper explained that he would be releasing this as a perk on a crowd-funding campaign for "War of the Rocket Men". The video also featured the returning voices of Christopher Daniel Barnes and Sara Ballantine as Spider-Man/Peter Parker and Mary Jane Watson respectively in an audio promo prologue entitled "Peter Finds Mary Jane".

After X-Men '97 was announced as a revival of the X-Men TV series by Marvel Studios for the streaming service Disney+, it marked a possibility that Spider-Man could be revived for Disney+ as well. In July 2022, Semper addressed this, stating that he would happily do it if he had the same creative freedom he had on the series:

I think, right now, they're doing an updated Spider-Man. They've done a number of [television] shows since mine and they're doing [Your Friendly Neighborhood Spider-Man] right now, I don't think that the politics of the situation will allow for [Spider-Man: The Animated Series] to be revived. If they did revive it, I don't know if I'd get to be involved. I was in a very good position because I was really able to have a lot of creative control over that show after [season one]. I don't know if I'd ever have that situation again, so it would really make it a different kind of thing. I don't know if I'd get that on a Spider-Man revival given it's now a property that's owned by [Disney and Sony] and there's a lot of politics involved, but hey, if someone wants to call me and say, 'Hey, we're gonna do more episodes and we're going to leave you alone', I'd be there in a heartbeat.
—John Semper, showrunner of The Animated Series

In February 2024, Semper expressed interest that he would consider reviving the series on Disney+, if Marvel Studios Animation reaches out to him. Christopher Daniel Barnes also expressed interest in reprising his role as Spider-Man if asked. In March 2024, Brad Winderbaum later commented on the possibility of a revival for the series:

We're doing that right now. We're in production on Daredevil: Born Again in New York, they're shooting as we speak. I'm seeing text messages come up from set," Winderbaum said. "That's probably the next show that is going to kind of revisit and revive a really strong, and one of my favorite pockets of our universe and our fandom. And… you never know, is the answer!
—Brad Winderbaum, head of Marvel Studios Animation

Spider-Man made a non-speaking cameo appearance in the X-Men '97 episode "Tolerance is Extinction – Part 1," being among the witnesses to the electromagnetic pulse (EMP) wave sent out across the world by Magneto. He appears again in the season finale, "Tolerance is Extinction – Part 3," this time as Peter Parker, as he, Mary Jane, and Flash watch Asteroid M hurtle towards Earth on a TV in the window of an electronics store. Series head writer Beau DeMayo later confirmed that the character is the same iteration from The Animated Series, and that he successfully rescued Mary Jane after the events of the series cliffhanger ending from season five. Christopher Daniel Barnes acknowledged the cameo, expressing interest in returning as Spider-Man in a potential revival, though no one has contacted him about it.

==== Spider-Man '94 ====
In June 2025, Marvel Comics announced that The Animated Series would receive a 5-issue limited series continuation titled Spider-Man '94 written by J. M. DeMatteis with art by Jim Towe. The comic series picks up with the cliffhanger ending of "Farewell, Spider-Man" in season five, with Peter searching for and rescuing Mary Jane Watson within the multiverse, before returning to New York to resume his heroics. The series will also debut two major Spider-Man villains who had been previously unadapted in The Animated Series. Spider-Man '94 began publication in September 2025. Semper Jr. confirmed that he had no involvement in the series and that he did not find out about the series until it was announced. In September 2026 it was announced that Semper will write a comic annual that will resolve the cliffhanger from the last episode of TV series, it will be released in December 2026.

== See also ==
- Spider-Man Unlimited
- The Spectacular Spider-Man
- Ultimate Spider-Man
- Marvel's Spider-Man
- Your Friendly Neighborhood Spider-Man
