= Debra Whitman =

- Debra Whitman, as depicted in a pin-up art by John Romita Jr. of The Amazing Spider-Man Annual #16 (December 1982)

Publication information
- Publisher: Marvel Comics
- First appearance: The Amazing Spider-Man #196 (September 1979)
- Created by: Marv Wolfman (writer); Al Milgrom (artist)

In-story information
- Species: Human
- Team affiliations: Empire State University
- Supporting character of: Spider-Man

Debra Whitman is a fictional character appearing in American comic books published by Marvel Comics. Introduced in The Amazing Spider-Man #196 (September 1979), she served as a brief love interest for Peter Parker in the Spectacular Spider-Man and The Amazing Spider-Man comic titles in the late 1970s and early 1980s. She is also one of the first characters to determine that Peter was Spider-Man, although she was later convinced she was delusional.

The character has appeared in Spider-Man media adaptations, most notably in Spider-Man: The Animated Series.

== Fictional character biography ==
Debra Whitman was a secretary in the biophysics department of Empire State University. While there, she met Peter and they started dating. However, things kept coming up in his secret life as Spider-Man and he kept giving her excuses to get out of the date. Because of Peter's rejections, she started to date Biff Rifkin for emotional support, but her infatuation with Peter did nothing but grow.

Debra also suffered from a mental instability that led her to idealize people and invert values. With Peter it grew further into her hallucinating that he was Spider-Man. When she told her psychiatrist, Dr. Baily Kuklin, about her hallucinations, he asked Peter to wear the Spider-Man suit to give her a shocking confrontation with reality to get her out of the hallucination. Peter refused, and indicated Biff Rifkin as a more reliable source of information. However, Biff already knew Debra when she was married to Mark Whitman. One day he asked her about her black eye and she gave evasive answers. That night he went to their house and saw Mark beating her. He rescued her and took her to the hospital, but she insisted Mark was a kind and gentle husband, locked in denial. Peter then wore the suit and told her he was Spider-Man. The shock made her come to her senses and decided to leave New York to get a divorce. During the superhero "Civil War", Peter reveals his identity as Spider-Man to the world. Thereafter, Debra is seen on the phone speaking to her co-writer about her new book, entitled "TWO FACED: How Spider-Man Ruined My Life". She seems discouraged about the title and tone of the book, but is committed to a book signing later in the day. Enraged, she then hurls items around the room to get out her anger before the signing. At the book signing, Spider-Man and the newly released Vulture are both seen planning to crash.

After Spider-Man defeats the Vulture, Debra reveals to Betty Brant the editors had forced her to exaggerate the mental damage that Peter had "done" to her in order to make for a better book. Debra's mother had been sick and the medical bills were far more than she could pay for, so when the Daily Bugle dug up all of Peter Parker's past relationships to get dirt on him, she jumped on the chance to write the book. Betty talked Debra into telling the truth to the Daily Globe, confidentially.

To save the life of May Parker, Peter and his wife Mary Jane Watson agree to allow the demon Mephisto to alter history. In the new timeline, Peter and Mary Jane were never married, and his identity as Spider-Man was forgotten. Consequently, Debra's knowledge of Peter's identity is erased as well.

== In other media ==
Debra Whitman as she appears in Spider-Man: The Animated Series

- Debra Whitman appears in Spider-Man: The Animated Series, voiced by Liz Georges. This version is a scientific genius, love interest for Flash Thompson, and rival of Peter Parker. After Morbius becomes a pseudo-vampire, Debra attempts to cure him, but her failure leads to her becoming a party girl until Flash steps in, helping her return to normal.
- Debra Whitman makes non-speaking appearances in The Spectacular Spider-Man. This version is Miles Warren's African-American secretary who is older than her comic book counterpart.
