= The Venom Saga =

Story arc from the 1994 animated series Spider-Man that focused on Venom

- Cover to the 2005 DVD release.
- Based on: Spider-Man by: Stan Lee; Steve Ditko
- Production company: Marvel Films Animation
- Release date: 2005
- Running time: 100 minutes
- Country: United States
- Language: English

"The Venom Saga" is a story arc from the 1994 animated series Spider-Man that focused on Venom. The description of the name and chosen episodes debuted in home media by Buena Vista Home Entertainment. The first three episodes are the three-part episode entitled "The Alien Costume" from the first season. The last two are the two-part episode entitled "Venom Returns" and "Carnage", which debuted in the third season. These certain episodes are responsible for debuting the symbiotic characters Venom and Carnage outside of comic books. The arc was released on DVD as Spider-Man: The Venom Saga.

== "The Alien Costume" ==
=== Production ===
There were many difficulties with bringing Venom to television because everyone had different ideas for the Venom story. Len Wein wrote the first draft, which was rejected. In a later meeting the creative team came up with a scene by scene plot for the show. The show took a different approach to bringing the alien costume to Earth from the comic books. In this episode, the alien costume is brought by a space shuttle, while in the comics, Spider-Man first wore the symbiote during the Secret Wars storyline on an alien planet called Battleworld, and later brought back to Earth. The ending of the second part is loosely based on Web of Spider-Man #1, in which Spider-Man removes the symbiote costume using the loud noise created by a church bell. The symbiote flees and merges with Eddie Brock, transforming him into Venom.

John Semper took the idea of Eddie Brock following Spider-Man on a train in the third part from Alfred Hitchcock's Strangers on a Train.

"The Alien Costume" is the only three-part episode from the first season of the animated series Spider-Man. Venom was one of Spider-Man's most popular villains at the time the episode aired. Originally, the episode was going to be two parts; however, the fans wanted to see more of the black costume, so a new second part was added into the middle of the episodes.

=== Part One ===
John Jameson and fellow astronaut Paul Stevens discover a rock known as Promethium X, which is said to be more powerful than plutonium. Unknown to the two, Promethium X also contains a mysterious life form, which manages to break free and tries to consume them. The space shuttle crashes on the George Washington Bridge over the Hudson River, where Rhino is sent by Kingpin to steal the Promethium X. Spider-Man arrives on the scene and manages to save Jameson and Stevens, yet unknown to Spider-Man, Eddie Brock is on the bridge too, and takes photos of him (and Rhino as well). However, when J. Jonah Jameson arrives on the scene, Eddie uses propaganda and frames Spider-Man for stealing something from the shuttle, which leads to a $1 million bounty on Spider-Man's head. However, Eddie deliberately does not mention to have seen Rhino at the scene also. Meanwhile, at home, Peter throws his costume in a laundry bin, as it is now useless to him. When he returns from the crash site, his suit carries what appears to be Hudson River pollution. The substance bonds to Peter as he sleeps, enhancing his abilities but making him more violent.

=== Part Two ===
The story continues where it last left off, with the whole city hunting Spider-Man for Jonah's $1 million bounty. Spider-Man manages to fight them off until he is shot with a Sonic Blaster device, which weakens him. Despite this, Spider-Man manages to escape, and focuses his attention on Brock and J. Jonah Jameson and warns him to call off his reward, also mentioning Rhino and how Brock neglected to mention him. After Jonah visits his hospitalized son, Jameson finds out from him that Brock was lying and fires him. He also calls off the manhunt for Spider-Man.

Noticing another disturbing change in his behavior, Spider-Man seeks the assistance of Curt Connors, who studies the suit and realizes that it is an alien symbiote. Spider-Man then uses the symbiote's powers to find a clue in Eddie's apartment, only to run into the Shocker, sent by Kingpin to destroy the evidence Brock has of the crash site. The two fight, and Shocker gains the advantage, and flees, but Spider-Man follows him. Shocker leads him to Alistair Smythe and the Promethium X, which Spider-Man steals. Kingpin and Shocker form a plan to kidnap John Jameson in an attempt to gain the Promethium X back. Using John as bait, they manage to lure Spider-Man to an old church. There, Shocker attacks Spider-Man, but is defeated. Eddie Brock tries to intervene, but is webbed up for his efforts. With Shocker at the mercy of Spider-Man, he begs for his life as Spider-Man is about to push him to his death. Spider-Man's conscience gets to him and he relents, only to have the symbiote push Shocker off the bell tower, but Spider-Man uses two web lines to save him. Spider-Man, remembering how the symbiote was unusually weakened when he was earlier attacked with a Sonic Blaster, realizes that it is particularly sensitive to loud noises. Spider-Man then uses the church bells and the noise weakens the symbiote, and it sloughs off Peter and slinks away. Peter Parker leaves, relieved to be away from the symbiote. Back at Kingpin's headquarters, Smythe discovers why Spider-Man was so willing to trade the Promethium X back to them: Promethium X has a short half-life and has already decayed into a harmless lump of lead. However, the symbiote was still alive and found a new host in Eddie Brock and transformed him into Venom.

=== Part Three ===
Spider-Man has returned to his old costume. He encounters Rhino and Shocker, who are defeated by Brock as Venom. Spider-Man attempts to reason with Brock, but he webs him up and unmasks him. After Venom ruins Peter's date with Mary Jane Watson and menaces Aunt May, he decides to fight back. He lures Brock to a space shuttle, where the symbiote is separated from him by the rocket's afterburners and blasted into space. In the aftermath, Brock is imprisoned at Ravencroft.

== "Venom Returns" and "Carnage" ==
=== Production ===
"Venom Returns" and "Carnage" are the eleventh and twelfth episodes from the third season of Spider-Man, also marking the thirty-eighth and thirty-ninth episodes.

=== "Venom Returns" ===
The symbiote returns to Earth and travels to Ravencroft to reunite with Eddie Brock, who then escapes as Venom. He is ordered by Dormammu, to whom the symbiote owes its earthly return, to steal a machine from Stark Enterprises capable of releasing Dormammu from the Dark Dimension. When Venom battles Spider-Man and War Machine, he is easily defeated by the two heroes. Baron Mordo and Dormammu help Eddie Brock's insane cellmate Cletus Kasady bond with another symbiote, dubbed Carnage. Carnage then assists Venom in his task to retrieve the technology from Stark Enterprises, though when Carnage attempts to destroy Spider-Man, Venom attacks him, telling him that Spider-Man is his and his alone.

=== "Carnage" ===
When Venom refuses to continue to work for Dormammu, Carnage is considered sufficient to collect life-force which is essential for Dormammu to enter Earth. Carnage kidnaps Ashley Kafka, whom Eddie has fallen in love with. Eddie then reluctantly teams with Iron Man and Spider-Man to save her. They are forced to send Carnage as well as Dormammu into the other dimension, as it appears he has formed a link between himself and Carnage. Carnage, unwilling to leave Earth alone, attempts to drag Ashley with him, though Venom sacrifices himself for the woman he loves.

== Cast ==
=== Main cast ===
- Christopher Daniel Barnes – Peter Parker / Spider-Man
- Hank Azaria – Eddie Brock / Venom
- Roscoe Lee Browne – Wilson Fisk / Kingpin
- Don Stark – Aleksei Sytsevich / Rhino
- Jim Cummings – Herman Schultz / Shocker
- Maxwell Caulfield – Alistair Smythe
- Scott Cleverdon – Cletus Kasady / Carnage
- Robert Hays – Tony Stark / Iron Man
- Tony Jay – Karl Mordo / Baron Mordo
- Ed Gilbert – Dormammu
- Joan Lee – Cassandra Webb / Madame Web
- Barbara Goodson – Ashley Kafka

=== Minor cast ===
- Ed Asner – J. Jonah Jameson
- Michael Horton – John Jameson
- Linda Gary – Aunt May
- Rodney Saulsberry – Robbie Robertson
- Sara Ballantine – Mary Jane Watson
- Patrick Labyorteaux – Flash Thompson
- Jennifer Hale – Felicia Hardy
- Joseph Campanella – Curt Connors
- Dawnn Lewis – Terri Lee
- James Avery – Jim "Rhodey" Rhodes / War Machine
- Majel Barrett – Anna Watson

== Reception ==
When the episodes were released in DVD as Spider-Man: The Venom Saga, Filip Vukcevic of IGN stated that while Venom "would ultimately suffer from over-exposure and endure too many misinterpretations on the printed page, all of his viciousness remained intact on the TV show."

== In other media ==
The Venom Saga, as well as the comic book story arc "Maximum Carnage" (1993), would be primarily adapted for the basis for the plot of the 2021 film Venom: Let There Be Carnage.

== Sources ==
- Cockburn, Paul (1996). The alien costume. London: Pan Boxtree Sapling. ISBN 9780752201627.
- Spider-Man: The Venom Saga [DVD]. Buena Vista Home Entertainment.
