= Peni Parker =

Marvel Comics superhero

- Peni Parker and SP//dr, from the cover of Edge of Spider-Geddon #2 (October 2018), by Jake Wyatt

Publication information
- Publisher: Marvel Comics
- First appearance: Edge of Spider-Verse #5 (October 2014)
- Created by: Gerard Way (writer); Jake Wyatt (artist)

In-story information
- Alter ego: Peni Parker
- Species: Peni: Human mutate; SP//dr: Spider / Robot
- Place of origin: Earth-14512
- Team affiliations: Spider-Army / Web-Warriors
- Abilities: Peni: Spider-Sense; Genius intellect; Psychic connection with SP//dr; SP//dr: Superhuman strength; Psychic connection with Peni; Web shooters on the wrists

Altered in-story information for adaptations to other media
- Partnerships: Spider-Man (Miles Morales); Spider-Man (Peter Parker); Spider-Man Noir; Spider-Ham; Spider-Gwen

Peni Parker is a superhero who appears in American comic books published by Marvel Comics. She was created by writer-musician Gerard Way and artist Jake Wyatt, and first appeared in the 2014 comic book series Edge of Spider-Verse. A second-generation spider-hero from an alternative universe, Peni is a Japanese American high school student possessing a psychic link with a radioactive spider named SP//dr with whom she jointly pilots a mech suit of the same name, a mantle inherited from her deceased father.

The character was significantly inspired by the 1995 anime television series Neon Genesis Evangelion. Both Peni Parker and SP//dr have made appearances in other media, most significantly the animated film Spider-Man: Into the Spider-Verse (2018) and its sequels Across the Spider-Verse (2023) and Beyond the Spider-Verse (2027), where she is voiced by Kimiko Glenn, and the video game Marvel Rivals, where she is voiced by Sally Amaki as a young adult from 2099.

== Publication history ==
Sometime after completing work on their debut solo album Hesitant Alien and following the hiatus of their band My Chemical Romance, comic writer and musician Gerard Way was contacted by Marvel Comics editor Nick Lowe, asking if they were interested in creating a custom Spider-Man for the then-upcoming Spider-Verse comic series. Lowe, a fan of Way's prior comics work, had previously approached Way about an X-Men annual series which ultimately never materialized. Enamored by the idea that they could do whatever they wanted without fear of being burdened by any prior continuity, Way ultimately agreed to the offer and began working with comic artist Jake Wyatt on their new creation.

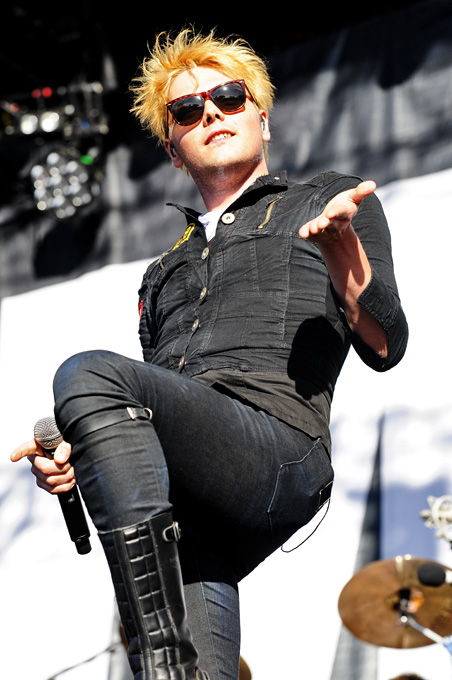
Gerard Way, Peni Parker's co-creator, performing with My Chemical Romance in 2012

Way "took the basic concepts of Spider-Man and then (…) looked deeper into it" while conceptualizing Peni, recalling in a 2014 interview with Rolling Stone, "I thought about the radioactive spider: 'What if it was more than just a bite? What if a bite was a psychic link and the spider stayed part of the story?' That brought up a little girl who loses her dad. Then I drew the spider suit." According to Way, SP//dr "is comprised of three vital components: a pilot, a machine, and a radioactive sentient spider acting as one half of the brain that makes it all work." Way opted to make their character female as they were more interested in creating female characters, stemming from both their past, and their prior work The Umbrella Academy. They also decided to include Daredevil in their story, deciding "[I]f I'm only getting going to get to write one Marvel comic, I'm going to put Daredevil in it as well."

Peni and SP//dr's comics were largely inspired by mecha anime, with Neon Genesis Evangelion singled out as an influence. As an easter egg, the main characters of Evangelion—Shinji Ikari, Rei Ayanami, Asuka Langley Soryu, and Kaworu Nagisa—make cameo appearances as Peni's classmates in her premiere issue, along with Simon from Gurren Lagann and Kei from Dirty Pair.

Peni Parker and SP//dr debuted in Edge of Spider-Verse #5, released on October 15, 2014. SP//dr's story was continued in the Spider-Geddon comic book Edge of Spider-Geddon #2 by Alberto Albuquerque, released on August 29, 2018. The same year, Peni and SP//dr appeared in the animated film Spider-Man: Into the Spider-Verse. The filmmakers, who initially considered a different Asian American Spider-Woman, Cindy Moon / Silk, for the film, chose Peni as her unique abilities contrasted with the film's other characters. At the suggestion of production designer and future Across the Spider-Verse co-director Justin Thompson, Peni was given a Sailor Moon-inspired redesign after the filmmakers, including director Bob Persichetti, found her initial design "iffy".

In 2022, Eisner Award-winning comic author Ken Niimura created Peni Parker: After School as part of the Spider-Verse Unlimited series exclusive to Marvel Unlimited, Marvel's digital comic service. The six-part story follows a younger Peni, delving into her relationship with her "Uncle Ben", how she feels about her father, and her struggles to juggle both school and being a superhero, also going into depth about her struggles to fit in with her fellow students due to her responsibilities as a hero. Niimura largely conceived of the story as an entry point to the character "for veterans and newcomers alike" as "(...) being a relatively new character, there's still not much published yet."

== Fictional character biography ==
=== Edge of Spider-Verse ===
Peni's father acted as the original pilot of the SP//dr mecha, in which he protected New York on Earth-14512 from crime and other dangers. After her father died, Peni is approached by her father's handlers, "Aunt May" and "Uncle Ben", who force her to become the new pilot of the SP//dr, releasing the sentient spider that controls part of the suit into a room with her to bite and bond with her, a process they describe as being incredibly painful. Soon after being bitten, Peni becomes the new protector of the city.

Five years later, a more solemn and matured 14-year-old Peni battles her universe's version of Mysterio – an obsessed fanboy of hers, while listening to music to help her focus. Peni eventually teams up with "D" (her universe's version of Daredevil) – who had known her father, and tells her that she is "too young" to feel "tired" as she says she is – though noting he felt her father's use of SP//dr caused it so that "even through the machine, you could feel a sadness, like something was missing from him", although seeming "pretty cool" – to battle a group of criminals given up by Mysterio (a fan of the various numerous "Gene-Pop" magazines about Peni) before being approached by Spider-Ham and Old Man Spider to join the Spider-Army to fight the Inheritors. Agreeing to join them, Peni states: "We're called SP//dr and we protect the city. Like my father, a soldier––who died in service of his people––we will be this, until terminal failure."

=== Edge of Spider-Geddon ===
Two years after the events of "Spider-Verse" in her home reality, a now-16-year-old Peni is approached by Addy Brock, asking if she was the pilot of SP//dr and her experiences as the SP//dr pilot. Peni ignores her, but Addy follows up by saying she is not as special as she thinks, before clarifying that she doesn't mean as an insult, and just wants to talk to her. At home, Peni tries to talk to Ben and May about being special, but her worries get pushed aside, which causes her to be annoyed and expresses her feelings of sadness towards the fact she isn't acknowledged as she should be.

While improving the SP//dr's web shooters, she notices Addy walking in the base and follows her. Peni finds another mech-suit similar to the SP//dr, but in black and powered by a "sym-engine" called VEN#m, with Addy as its pilot. Peni becomes furious at Ben and May for not telling her about this.

When a kaiju-like creature named M.O.R.B.I.U.S. starts to drain the city's electrical energy, Peni goes after it as SP//dr, only to be temporarily disabled due to her frustration clouding her judgement. In order to defeat M.O.R.B.I.U.S., Peni's aunt and uncle send VEN#m to defeat the creature. It is successful, but the SYM Engine inside it, which is shown to not be fully developed and is later revealed to still have unresolved issues, causes VEN#m to malfunction, causing the mech suit to attain sentience and start to consume Addy. When May flies in to fix the problem manually, VEN#m consumes her and Addy. SP//dr defeats VEN#m, but is unable to save May and Addy.

=== Spider-Verse: Spider-Zero ===
A now-17 year old Peni returns in the Spider-Verse: Spider-Zero chapter "SP//dr Reactivated", where as Miles Morales travels to her reality on behalf of Spider-Zero to investigate multiverse mishaps, he assists her in facing Kraven the Hunter, an old enemy of her father's who was incarcerated and assumed dead before being broken out by Nathan Essex to join his Weapon Six. Equipped with a red diamond implant, Kraven seeks revenge on SP//dr for arresting him, unaware the mech has a new pilot, while Essex seeks revenge on Ben, his old co-worker. After noticing Kraven refusing to attack Miles due to his age and seeing that he still had a moral code, Peni disembarks from SP//dr, and, realizing his revenge is moot, Kraven allows himself to be subdued. Later, after Nathan is arrested, he swears to Ben that he will send the rest of Weapon Six after Peni in the future.

=== End of the Spider-Verse ===
A now-18-year-old Peni returns in End of the Spider-Verse operating her larger SP//dr mecha, alongside Takuya Yamashiro and his mech, Leopardon.

== Alternate versions ==
=== Future SP//dr ===
An alternate-universe version of Peni Parker from an unidentified Earth appears in Spider-Gwen and Cosmic Ghost Rider. This version is a member of the Amazing Eight until she is killed by the Cosmic Ghost Rider.

=== Peni Parker: After School ===
An alternate-universe version of Peni Parker, based on the Spider-Man: Into the Spider-Verse iteration, appears in the Marvel Unlimited webtoon Peni Parker: After School. This version has a secret identity.

=== Peni Porker ===
An alternate-universe version of Peni Parker from an unidentified Earth related to Spider-Ham's named Peni Porker makes a cameo appearance in the graphic novel Spider-Ham: A Pig in Time.

== In other media ==
=== Television ===
SP//dr makes a non-speaking cameo appearance in the Ultimate Spider-Man episode "Return to the Spider-Verse".

=== Film ===
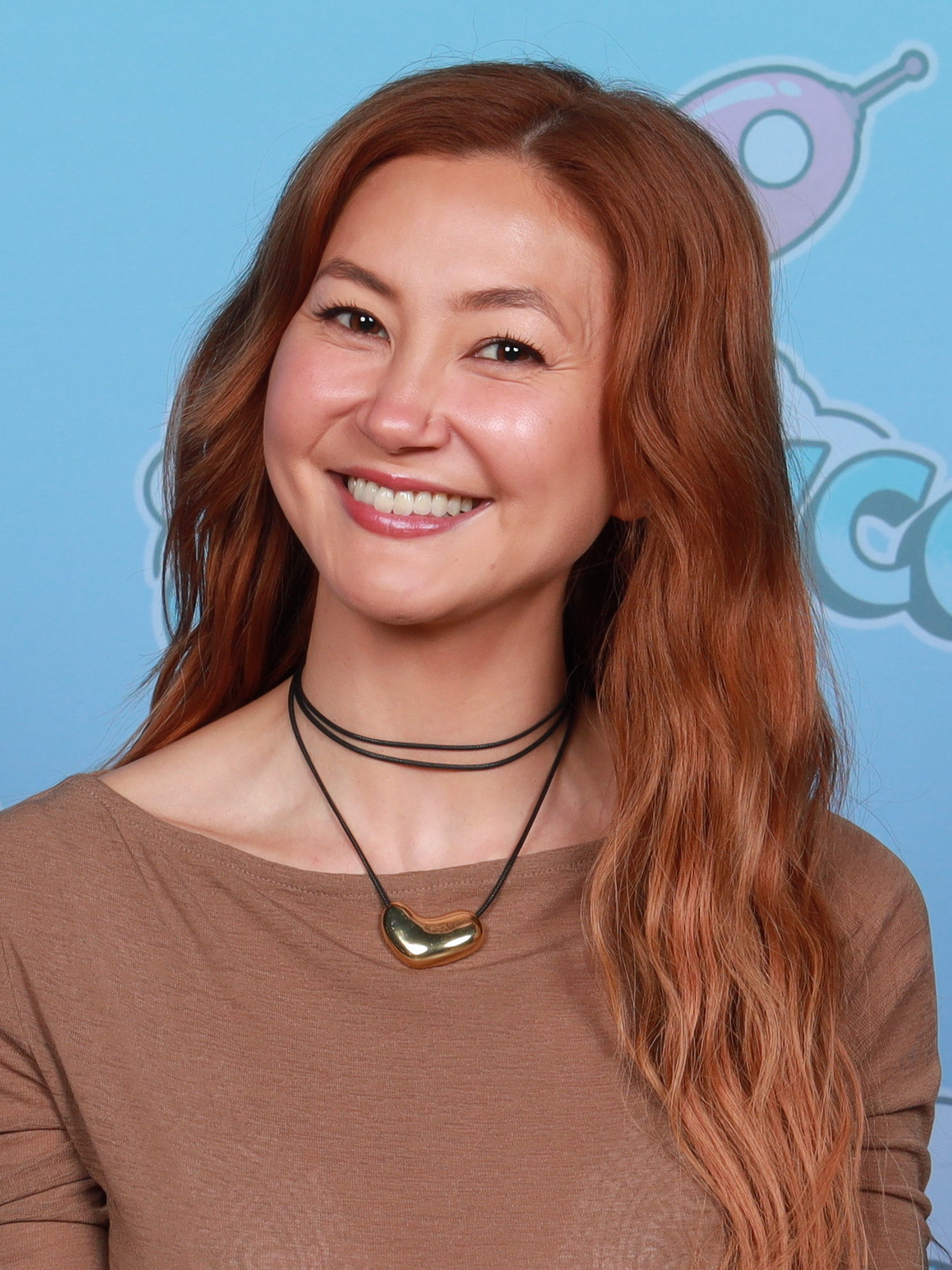
Kimiko Glenn voices Peni Parker in the Spider-Verse film series.

- Peni Parker and SP//dr appear in Spider-Man: Into the Spider-Verse (2018), with the former voiced by Kimiko Glenn in English and Rie Takahashi in Japanese. Sporting a Sailor Moon-inspired design, Peni is presented as a perky and energetic individual while SP//dr is a one-piece capsule cockpit with a dome-shaped one-way visor that provides Peni with a HUD-style view, magnetically manipulated appendages, and various tools in its fingers. After arriving in Miles Morales' universe along with Spider-Ham and Spider-Man Noir due to the Kingpin's machinations, Peni and SP//dr join forces with them, among other "Spider-People", to return to their respective home universes. While SP//dr is severely damaged by the Scorpion, Peni rescues the radioactive spider within it before returning to her universe to rebuild SP//dr.
- Peni Parker and SP//dr appear in Spider-Man: Across the Spider-Verse (2023), with the former voiced again by Kimiko Glenn. As of this film, Peni has successfully rebuilt SP//dr, with its design now resembling its comics counterpart, and joined Miguel O'Hara's Spider-Society.
- Glenn will reprise her role as Peni Parker in Spider-Man: Beyond the Spider-Verse (2027).

=== Video games ===
- SP//dr appears as a playable character in Spider-Man Unlimited.
- Peni Parker and SP//dr appear as playable characters in Marvel Puzzle Quest, Marvel Duel, Marvel Snap and Marvel Strike Force.
- Peni Parker and SP//dr appear as playable characters in Marvel Contest of Champions. Additionally, alternate universe versions of Peni appear in a promotional video, such as a powerless Peni from Earth-51778 and a magical girl from Earth-23, among others.
- Peni Parker and SP//dr appear as a hybrid playable character in Marvel Rivals, with Sally Amaki voicing the former in the English and Japanese versions. This version of Peni is an 18-year-old Parker descendant from 2099.
- Peni Parker and SP//dr appear as a hybrid playable character in Marvel Tokon: Fighting Souls, voiced by Risa Mei in English and again by Rie Takahashi in Japanese. In the game's story, the Champion causes timespace distortions that pull her and SP//dr to Spider-Man's Earth, where he recruits her to the Amazing Guardians alongside Ms. Marvel and Star-Lord for the Champion's fighting tournament.

=== Miscellaneous ===
- Peni Parker and SP//dr appear as playable characters in Marvel Champions: The Card Game.
- Peni Parker and SP//dr appear as a playable character in the card game Magic: The Gathering.

=== Merchandise ===
- SP//dr received a Build-A-Figure in Hasbro's Marvel Legends toy line.
- The Into the Spider-Verse incarnations of Peni Parker and SP//dr received figures in Hasbro's film tie-in toy line and Sentinel's SV-Action series.
- Peni Parker and SP//dr received Nendoroids from the Good Smile Company.
