= Spider-Geddon =

Spider-Man comic book series

- Cover of Spider-Geddon #1 (October 2018) by Jorge Molina

Publication information
- Publisher: Marvel Comics
- Format: Limited series
- Genre: Superhero; Crossover
- Publication date: October – December 2018
- No. of issues: 6
- Main character(s): Spider-Man (Peter Parker); Superior Octopus/Superior Spider-Man; Scarlet Spider (Ben Reilly); Scarlet Spider (Kaine Parker); Silk (Cindy Moon); Spider-Bitch (Ashley Barton); Spider-Girl (Anya Corazon); Spider-Girl (May Parker); Spider-Man (Miles Morales); Spider-Man (Pavitr Prabhakar); Spider-Man 2099 (Miguel O'Hara); Spider-Man Noir; Spider-Man of Earth-1048; Spider-Man (Takuya Yamashiro); Spider-Punk (Hobart Brown); Spider-Woman (Jessica Drew); Spider-Woman (Gwen Stacy); Inheritors

Creative team
- Written by: Christos Gage
- Penciller: Jorge Molina

Spider-Geddon, also known as Revenge of the Spider-Verse, is a 2018 comic book limited series and crossover storyline published by Marvel Comics featuring multiple alternative versions of Spider-Man that had appeared in various media, and his supporting cast. In this sequel to Spider-Verse, the Inheritors have found a way out of the decimated world they were imprisoned on and are now determined to take their revenge on the Spider-Army and feed on them once again. A sequel, titled End of the Spider-Verse, was released in October 2022.

== Publication history ==
The story was first announced with blank teaser posters, with the tagline "Spider-Geddon is nigh". It was eventually revealed that the story would feature several alternate versions of Spider-Man and his related characters, like the previous crossover event, Spider-Verse. The creative team, writer Christos Gage and artist Jorge Molina, was announced on June 29 in a press release. Editor Nick Lowe explained that "Spider-Verse took the multitudes of Spider-Characters and put them all on the same stage and we've been playing with it ever since. Spider-Geddon straps dynamite to that stage and blows it to smithereens. The most dangerous spider-villain ever, Morlun, and his family of Inheritors were trapped in the perfect prison at the end of Spider-Verse. But like in any super hero story, there's always a way out and you won't believe how these Spider-Eaters get out. But they're out and they want revenge."

Gage had previously worked for Dan Slott in the Spider-Verse comic, and became the lead writer because Slott was busy writing the Tony Stark: Iron Man and Fantastic Four comic books. The publishers also clarified in the New York Comic Con that the lead character would be Miles Morales, and not Peter Parker.

The event began with a 5-issue Edge of Spider-Geddon miniseries, featuring side stories of alternate versions of Spider-Man. Spider-Geddon #0 introduced the character from the Spider-Man 2018 video game into comics, and set up the plot for the game's sequel. Both the video game and the comic are written by Gage, who said that "Since I have been writing for the video game for the past three years (along with the ever-amazing Dan Slott, Jon Paquette, and Ben Arfmann), it seemed like a perfect time to bring that Pete into the mix". The first illustrated teaser poster featured a black silhouette of a Spider-Man character, who was revealed to be the one from the game in a later full version of the poster.

Superior Octopus #1 introduced the main theme, and the main Spider-Geddon started to be published after it. One of the tie-in comics is a third volume of the Spider-Gwen comic book, named Spider-Gwen: Ghost-Spider. It is written by novelist Seanan McGuire and pictured by artist Rosi Kampe.

== Plot ==
Superior Octopus establishes himself as a local hero of San Francisco. He has invented a machine using technology of the Inheritors that makes clones of himself, allowing his consciousness to jump to one of those in case of death. Spider-UK, Spider-Woman of Earth-982, Spider-Gwen of Earth-65, Doctor Octopus (Octavia Octo) of Earth-1104, Spider-Ham, Spider-Punk of Earth-138, and Spider-Man Noir gather at the lab to warn him of the risk. Morlun, Verna and Jennix emerge from one of the machines and kill Spider-Man Noir and Spider-UK. Morlun departs to target Peter Parker.

As the Inheritors continue to emerge, the spiders suggest that Octavius trigger the base's self-destruct, with Spider-Gwen apparently sacrificing herself to trap the Inheritors in the base as the others retreat. With the Inheritors now restricted to their current bodies, Octavius and Spider-Punk suggest killing the Inheritors while Miles, Spider-Woman and Spider-Ham vow to adhere to their old philosophies. Octavius returns to the Superior Spider-Man costume, and both groups start to recruit allies from alternate dimensions. Verna takes a detour in her mission and absorbs the life force of Karn. Spider-Gwen finds herself on Earth-3109.

Arriving on Earth-51778, Superior Spider-Man and Spider-Man of Earth-1048 warn Takuya Yamashiro of the Inheritors. On Earth-50101, Miles Morales and Pavitr Prabhakar talk about Superior Spider-Man's group plan to kill the Inheritors as they stop a group of robbers. The two meet up with Spider-Man and Spinneret from Earth-18119, Spider-Ham, Silk, SP//dr, and Spider-Pete and Spider-Ben of Earth-91918. Back on Earth-51778, Superior Spider-Man, Spider-Man of Earth-1048, Spiders-Man of Earth-11580, Takuya Yamashiro, Spider-Man of Earth-138, Octavia Otto, Web-Slinger of Earth-31913, and Norman Osborn of Earth-44145 talk about how to destroy the Inheritors while Kaine's group (Ashley Barton, Jessica Drew, Astro-Spider, and Spider-Kid) pursues Verna before she can find the crystal containing Solus' soul. Octavia has found that Ben Reilly has followed them as he is familiar with New U Technology's cloning technology. At New U Technologies, Solus' body is restored as Daemos, Brix, Bora, and Jennix await Verna's return with the crystal. As Jennix tries to speed up the construction of the body banks, Spider-Ham reports back to the rest of his group. Before Miles can detonate the support beams, they are attacked by Brix, Bora, and Daemos. As Bora works to drain the life force from Miles, SP//dr is advised by Miles to activate the detonators in her suit. SP//dr reluctantly does so until Superior Spider-Man's group arrives and the other Spiders retreat. Osborn has a talk with Spiders-Man about his vision on the Web of Life and Destiny as they have a secret strategy to keep the Inheritors on Earth-616.

Spider-Woman makes it back to Earth-616 with the crystal containing Solus' life force, but is captured by Jennix. Jennix uses the crystal in tandem with the cloning machine, which resurrects Solus. Spider-Punk informs the rest of Superior Spider-Man's group of Solus' resurrection. Osborn takes Spiders-Man to Loomworld, where they find Karn dead and the Web of Life and Destiny unguarded. Spiders-Man has his spiders eat Karn's corpse as Osborn destroys the Web of Life and Destiny to prevent inter-dimensional travel. On Takuya Yamashiro's mecha Leopardon, Superior Spider-Man figures out that someone has trapped them on Earth-616 with the Inheritors. As Pavitr and Octavia work on a way to fix it, Superior Spider-Man takes Ben Reilly to the Transamerica Pyramid, where they find that Jennix has cobbled together more cloning vats. Superior Spider-Man knocks out Ben Reilly and hands him over to the Inheritors as part of a deal that includes Solus sparing Earth-616. Solus agrees to show Earth-616 mercy with no promises towards anyone who displeases the Inheritors. As Superior Spider-Man leaves, the Inheritors close in on an unconscious Ben Reilly and Miles Morales summons the Enigma Force.

The Enigma Force states that it is a tool to be used by humans who are worthy. When it asks if they have all made unforgivable mistakes, those on Miles' team face their regrets while Miles states that the Inheritors killed a version of Captain Universe from Earth-13. As Solus dismisses Superior Spider-Man, Spider-Man of Earth-1048 is revealed to have secretly followed Superior Spider-Man and thinks that he has betrayed him. Ben Reilly awakens as Daemos advises Jennix to eat him. As Jennix feeds on Ben, he absorbs some of his memories, including his previous death and resurrection and knowledge of New U Technologies' cloning banks. Just then, Solus is shot in the back by Miles Morales, who has been transformed into Captain Universe by the Enigma Force. Miles attacks Solus, Brix, Bora, and Daemos with Leopardon's Sword Vigor attack. Later, Superior Spider-Man reveals to the others that he revived the Inheritors as babies, intending for them to be raised to not become villains. Spider-Ma'am takes in the baby Inheritors as foster children.

== Issues ==
=== Lead-up ===
- Edge of Spider-Geddon #1–4
- Superior Octopus #1

=== Main plot ===
- Spider-Geddon #0–5

=== Tie-ins ===
- Peter Parker, The Spectacular Spider-Man #311–313
- Spider-Force #1–3
- Spider-Geddon Handbook #1
- Spider-Girls #1–3
- Spider-Gwen: Ghost Spider #1–3
- Superior Spider-Man Vol. 2 #1
- Vault of Spiders #1–2

=== Aftermath ===
- Spider-Gwen: Ghost Spider #4

== Collected editions ==
| Title | Material collected | Publication date | ISBN |
|---|---|---|---|
| Edge of Spider-Geddon | Edge of Spider-Geddon #1–4, Superior Octopus #1 | January 15, 2019 | 978-1302914745 |
| Spider-Geddon | Spider-Geddon #0–5, Spider-Geddon: Vault of Spiders #1–2 | February 19, 2019 | 978-1302914752 |
| Spider-Geddon: Covert Ops | Spider-Force #1–3, Spider-Girls #1–3 | February 27, 2019 | 978-1302914974 |
| Peter Parker: The Spectacular Spider-Man, Vol. 5: Spider-Geddon | Peter Parker: The Spectacular Spider-Man #311–313, Spider-Geddon: Spider-Man Noir Video Comic #1, Spider-Geddon: Animated Video Comic #1 | February 19, 2019 | 978-1302914530 |
| Spider-Verse/Spider-Geddon Omnibus | Edge of Spider-Verse #1–5; Spider-Verse (2014) #1–2; Superior Spider-Man (2013) #32–33; Amazing Spider-Man (2014) #7-15; Spider-Man 2099 (2014) #5-8; Scarlet Spiders #1–3; Spider-Woman (2014) #1–4; Spider-Verse Team-Up #1–3; Edge of Spider-Geddon #1–4; Spider-Geddon #0–5; Superior Octopus #1; Spider-Force #1–3; Spider-Girls #1–3; Peter Parker, The Spectacular Spider-Man (2017) #311–313; Spider-Gwen: Ghost Spider #1–4; Vault of Spiders #1–2; Spider-Geddon: Spider-Man Noir Video Comic; Spider-Geddon: Spider-Gwen – Ghost Spider Video Comic; Spider-Geddon: Spider-Man Video Comic; Spider-Geddon Handbook, and material from Free Comic Book Day 2014 (Guardians of the Galaxy) | September 14, 2022 | 978-1302947422 |

== Reception ==
The series as a whole received mixed reviews, with critics criticizing the plot, treatment of characters, and pacing. Critics noted that the lack of the main Spider-Man made the story feel hollow. However, critics praised the artstyle as well as the relationship between Insomniac's Spider-Man and Superior Spider-Man. According to Comicbook Roundup, the series has an average score of 7.1 out of 10.

According to Comic Book Roundup, Spider-Geddon Issue 0 received a score of 6.7 out of 10 based on 11 reviews.

According to Comic Book Roundup, Issue 1 received a score of 7.5 out of 10 based on 16 reviews.

According to Comic Book Roundup, Issue 2 received a score of 7.4 out of 10 based on 8 reviews.

According to Comic Book Roundup, Issue 3 received a score of 7.2 out of 10 based on 11 reviews.

According to Comic Book Roundup, Issue 4 received a score of 7.4 out of 10 based on 9 reviews.

According to Comic Book Roundup, Issue 5 received a score of 6.6 out of 10 based on 10 reviews.
