= Marvel Champions: The Card Game =

Card game published by Fantasy Flight Games

- Designers: Michael Boggs, Nate French, Caleb Grace
- Publishers: Fantasy Flight Games
- Publication: 2019
- Players: 1-4
- Playing time: 45-90 minutes
- Media type: Card game

Marvel Champions: The Card Game is a cooperative, living card game published by Fantasy Flight Games since 2019. Players control decks representing heroes from the Marvel Universe, and work together to defeat a villain that is attempting to complete a "Scheme". Players can customize their hero's deck, and the game includes various modular encounters to customize villain scenarios.

The core set was originally released in 2019. Expansions to the game are released in the form of hero decks, villain scenarios, or larger campaign boxes that include both hero and villain scenario content.

== Gameplay ==
Marvel Champions is played over a series of rounds, which consist of all of the players taking turns, followed by the villain. The game is cooperative, meaning that players work as a team toward a shared goal and there is no competition among them. Each player chooses one hero, which is represented by a 40–50 card deck. Each deck includes cards specific to that hero; cards from one of four Aspects: Justice, Leadership, Aggression, and Protection; and "basic" cards. During a player's turn, they can play cards, activate card abilities, use their basic abilities to attack the villain and their minions or reduce the number of threat tokens on a scheme, and switch between their hero and alter-ego forms. Some cards and abilities require players to be in either their hero or alter-ego form to use. Cards are used to activate superpowers, recruit allies, upgrade the hero and their allies, or provide new abilities. Players discard cards from their hand to pay the resource cost of the cards they wish to play.

On their turn, the villain has an activation against each player. If the player is in their hero form, the villain attacks them. If the player is in their alter-ego form, the villain adds threat counters to their main scheme. Players have the option to defend incoming attacks with their hero or allies under their control. Once the villain has activated against each hero, the players are all dealt a card from the encounter deck. Encounter cards may cause the villain to attack players again, advance their scheme, or add minions, enemy upgrades, or side-schemes to the play area.

In the game's standard mode, the villain has two forms which the players must reduce to zero health in order to win. Each form beyond the first is more difficult. The game ends when the players win by reducing the villain's second form to zero health, or the villain wins by knocking all of the players' heroes unconscious or completing the final stage of their scheme.

Between games, players can customize their hero's deck. Each hero comes with cards unique to their deck that must be included. Players then choose from one of four kinds of Aspects, which represent how the hero behaves. The four Aspects in the game are: Justice, Leadership, Aggression, and Protection. Justice cards focus on preventing the villain from advancing their scheme, Leadership cards focus on allies, Aggression cards are damage based, and Protection cards are primarily meant to prevent incoming damage. The game also include basic cards, which can be used in any deck.

Villain scenarios are also customizable and consist of the villain's character card, their main scheme, and an encounter deck which contains a mix of cards unique to that villain, as well as smaller encounter sets that the players choose to add. Players can adjust each villain's difficulty by choosing different encounter sets, using the villain's second and third forms instead of the first and second, using only one of the villain's forms, or dealing themselves extra encounter cards during the encounter phase.

== Components ==
Marvel Champions is played using player cards, which consist of hero decks, aspect cards, and basic cards; villain cards made up of villain decks, main schemes, encounter sets; status cards used to track when characters have the games various conditions applied to them; various tokens to track damage to minions and allies, villain progress toward completing a scheme, or other resources generated by cards; and dials to track hero and villain health.

=== Core set heroes and villains ===
The Marvel Champions core set includes five heroes: Iron Man, Black Panther, Spider-Man, Captain Marvel, and She-Hulk. The villains included are Rhino, Klaw, and Ultron. It also included several encounter sets to customize villain scenarios, additional basic and Aspect cards to customize hero decks, and enough tokens and dials to support up to four players.

== Expansions ==
Fantasy Flight releases content expansions for Marvel Champions in three forms: Hero packs that include a prebuilt hero deck, as well as additional Aspect cards; Scenario packs, which include a new villain and encounter sets; and larger campaign expansions that include new heroes, as well as villains and encounter sets.

=== Hero packs ===
Hero Releases
Hero Expansion	Hero 1	Hero 2	Hero 3	Hero 4
Hero Expansion 1	Captain America	Hulk	Doctor Strange, Ms. Marvel	Black Widow (Natasha Romanova), Thor
Hero Expansion 2	Ant-Man	Wasp	Quick Silver	Scarlet Witch
Hero Expansion 3	Star-Lord	Gamora	Drax	Venom
Hero Expansion 4	Nebula	War Machine	Valkyrie	Vision
Hero Expansion 5	Nova	Ironheart	Spider-Ham	SP//dr
Hero Expansion 6	Cyclops	Phoenix	Wolverine	Storm Gambit Rogue
Hero Expansion 7	Psylocke	Angel	X-23	Deadpool
Hero Expansion 8	Iceman	Jubilee	Nightcrawler	Magneto
Hero Expansion 9	Black Panther (Shuri)	Silk	Falcon	Winter Soldier
Hero Expansion 10	Wonder Man	Hercules		

=== Scenario packs ===
- Green Goblin
- Kang the Conqueror
- Wrecking Crew
- The Hood
- MojoMania
- Trickster Takeover
- Synthezoid Smackdown

=== Campaign boxes ===
Campaign boxes
Campaign name	Heroes included	Villains included
The Rise of Red Skull	Hawkeye and Spider-Woman	Crossbones, Absorbing Man, Taskmaster, Arnim Zola, and Red Skull.
Galaxy's Most Wanted	Rocket Raccoon and Groot	Drang, Collector, Nebula, and Ronan the Accuser.
The Mad Titan's Shadow	Spectrum and Adam Warlock	Loki, Hela, Ebony Maw, Corvus Glaive, Proxima Midnight, and Thanos.
Sinister Motives	Spider-Man (Miles Morales) and Ghost-Spider	Sandman, Venom, Mysterio, The Sinister Six, and Venom Goblin.
Mutant Genesis	Shadowcat and Colossus	Sabretooth, a Sentinel, Master Mold, The Brotherhood of Mutants, and Magneto.
NeXt Evolution	Cable and Domino	Marauders, Juggernaut, Mister Sinister and Stryfe.
Age of Apocalypse	Bishop and Magik	Unus, The Four Horsemen, Dark Beast and Apocalypse.
Agents of S.H.I.E.L.D.	Maria Hill and Nick Fury	Black Widow (Yelena Belova), Batroc, M.O.D.O.K., Thunderbolts and Baron Zemo.
Civil War	Hulkling and Tigra	Iron-Man (Villain/Leader), Captain America (Villain/Leader), Captain Marvel (Villain/Leader), and Spider-Woman (Villain/Leader)

== Reception and recognition ==
- Marvel Champions was Board Game Quest's 2019 Cooperative Game of the Year.
- Board Game Hits rated Marvel Champions a Smash Hit (10/10) for solo gamers, praising it for its "careful blend of theme, mechanics, and flexibility."
