= Gwen Stacy (Spider-Verse) =

Character in the Spider-Verse franchise

Gwen Stacy Spider-Woman
- Spider-Verse character
- Gwen Stacy as she appears in costume in Spider-Man: Across the Spider-Verse
- First appearance: Spider-Man: Into the Spider-Verse (2018)
- Based on: Gwen Stacy (Earth-65) by; Jason Latour; Robbi Rodriguez; Gwen Stacy (Earth-616) by; Stan Lee; Steve Ditko
- Adapted by: Phil Lord; Rodney Rothman
- Voiced by: Hailee Steinfeld; Kelley Mack (voice double, commercials)

In-universe information
- Full name: Gwendolyn Maxine "Gwen" Stacy
- Alias: Spider-Woman
- Species: Human mutate
- Occupation: Vigilante; Student; Drummer; Ballet dancer (formerly)
- Affiliation: Brooklyn Visions Academy; The Mary Janes (formerly); Spider-Society (formerly)
- Weapon: Web-shooters
- Family: George Stacy (father)
- Religion: Catholic
- Origin: Chelsea, New York City, Earth-65
- Nationality: American
- Abilities: Ability to cling to most surfaces; Precognitive Spider-Sense; Shoot strong spider-web strings (via web-shooters); Interdimensional travel (via watch)

Gwendolyn Maxine "Gwen" Stacy, also known by her alias Spider-Woman, and colloquially as Spider-Gwen, is a character appearing in the Spider-Verse film franchise, based on the Marvel Comics Multiverse character of the same name by Jason Latour and Robbi Rodriguez, in-turn inspired by the original Gwen Stacy comic book character by Stan Lee and Steve Ditko. In her origin story, Gwen gets her superhuman spider-powers and abilities after being bitten by a radioactive spider. These powers include superhuman strength, agility, reflexes, stamina, durability, coordination, and balance; clinging to surfaces and ceilings like a spider; and detecting danger with her precognition ability called "spider-sense", using wrist-mounted "web-shooter" devices to shoot artificial spider-webs of her own design, which she uses both for fighting and for web-swinging across New York City. Gwen initially used her powers recklessly, but after accidentally killing her best friend Peter after he was transformed into the Lizard, she began to use her powers more carefully, closing herself off from others in an attempt to avoid the same mistake. She thereafter learns to reconnect with others on meeting Miles Morales, Peni Parker, and alternate versions of Peter, later joining the Spider-Society.

Voiced by Hailee Steinfeld, the character first appears in Spider-Man: Into the Spider-Verse (2018). Steinfeld reprised her role in the sequel Spider-Man: Across the Spider-Verse (2023), and is expected to reprise her role in the upcoming films Spider-Man: Beyond the Spider-Verse (2027) and Spider-Woman (TBA).

The character has been received positively by audiences and critics alike, who consider her as helping transform the Gwen Stacy character into having a more prominent role in Spider-Man lore. Her expanded role in Across was particularly commended, with much discussion about her arc in the film being a queer coded allegory for the transgender experience. (Note: Sources citing such audience interpretations include:) Those who asserted this interpretation praised Gwen as a positive media portrayal of a trans allegory, even if the character is not depicted as trans.

== Appearances ==
=== Into the Spider-Verse ===
Gwen is introduced as a teenager in Spider-Man: Into the Spider-Verse, explaining that she has been Spider-Woman for two years. She also mentions that she failed to save her universe's Peter Parker, who was her best friend, blaming herself for his death. Due to feeling responsible for Peter's death, Gwen decided to cut herself off from others, in order to not hurt anyone further.

She explains that during battle with Doctor Octopus, she was pulled in another dimension. Her "spider-sense" led her to Brooklyn Visions Academy, where she would meet Miles, who is unaware of her identity as Spider-Woman. In an awkward exchange with him, she introduces herself under the alias "Gwanda". When first speaking to her, Miles is depicted as extremely anxious. Their meeting is awkward and Miles, not having a handle on his powers yet, gets his hand stuck in Gwen's hair, resulting in her distinctive undercut later in the film. At one point, Gwen webs up Miles and Peter B. Parker, taking the briefcase they had stolen from Alchemax.

Gwen, along with the other Spider-people (Peter, Spider-Ham, Spider-Man Noir, and Peni Parker), are seen returning to their respective dimensions. Right before the credits of Into the Spider-Verse, a flash featuring the color scheme of Gwen's dimension is seen, with her voice also heard calling to Miles.

=== Across the Spider-Verse ===
Gwen Stacy as she appears out of costume in Into the Spider-Verse (top) and Across the Spider-Verse (bottom)

Set over a year after the events of Into the Spider-Verse, the sequel gives Gwen more screen time and adds more depth to her backstory. In Across the Spider-Verse, her connection with Miles begins to be explored, with producer Amy Pascal calling the film a "love story" about the two. While mutual romantic feelings between the two characters are explored, Gwen keeps Miles at a distance throughout the film, fearing that Gwen Stacy falling for Spider-Man can never end well.

The film's opening is centered on Gwen, with its narrative crosscut with visuals of her drumming intensely for her band, the Mary Janes. The narrative element of the opening focuses on her backstory and struggling relationship with her father, police captain George Stacy. It is revealed that Earth-65's Peter Parker turns into the Lizard after experimenting on himself. As the Lizard, Peter crashes a high school dance to attack his bullies. Gwen battles the Lizard as Spider-Woman, unaware that she's fighting Peter. During the battle, Peter is fatally wounded by debris and reverts to his human form before dying. Gwen is guilt-ridden upon realizing she inadvertently killed her best friend. Captain Stacy sees Spider-Woman at the scene and, thinking she is responsible for Peter's death, dedicates himself to arresting her.

Wrongly accused of murdering Peter, Gwen becomes a fugitive while continuing to fight villains as Spider-Woman; she is seen fighting an interdimensional Italian Renaissance-themed version of the Vulture. During the fight, she meets Miguel O'Hara (known as Spider-Man 2099) and another Spider-Woman, Jess Drew. The latter is based on the Jessica Drew from Spider-Woman comics lore; in Across the Spider-Verse, she serves as Gwen's mentor and urges to include her in the Spider-Society, despite Miguel's initial push back. At the end of their battle with the Vulture, Gwen is again confronted by her father and in this moment, reveals her identity to him. He remains committed to arresting Spider-Woman, completely destroying his relationship with her. Reluctantly, Miguel allows Gwen to join the Spider-Society and she departs alongside him and Jess.

Gwen later travels to Earth-1610, to reconnect with Miles, visiting him in his room and stumbling upon his sketchbook which includes various sketches of her. She also serves as a sort-of guide for Miles, discussing the wider Spider-Verse with him. Later, Gwen meets Miles' parents who get a sense of Miles' feelings for her.

The film also introduces Spider-Punk (Hobart "Hobie" Brown), based on the comics character of the same name, who she becomes "best buddies" with. Miles perceives Gwen as being "starry-eyed" for Hobie and is jealous of their close friendship; she joined his band, wears shoes he gifted her, and often leaves "a lot of stuff at his house". The relationship between Gwen and Hobie is somewhat ambiguous, potentially placing Hobie into a love triangle with Miles. Hobie is shown to be a member of the Spider-Society in part to support Gwen and later Miles.

The Spider-Society asserts theories involving "canon events" and anomalies to the canon, which Jess and Miguel share with Gwen, who had reluctantly accepted as facts when she joined. Miguel and the Spider-Society assert that Miles is the original anomaly and that his father, who will become a police captain as well, must die as a "canon event" that all Spider-heroes experience. Miles is hurt that Gwen did not reveal this information to him prior. Set on saving his father, Miles escapes from Miguel and the Spider-Society. Seeing Gwen as a liability, Miguel dismisses Gwen from the Spider-Society, with him and Jess aware that Gwen may be apprehended upon her return to her home universe.

Upon returning to her home dimension, she reconnects with her father, who tells her he has resigned from his position as captain and will no longer pursue her arrest. Due to his resignation not causing the collapse of her universe, Gwen appears to realize that Miles may have been correct that the canon can be broken. Upon returning to Miles' dimension, Gwen's spider–sense alerts her that Miles is trapped in another universe, hinting at their strong bond. After speaking with Miles' parents and promising them that she will bring their son home, Gwen assembles a new team consisting of Spider-Punk, Spider-Man India, Spider-Byte, Peter B. Parker, Peni Parker, Spider-Ham, and Spider-Man Noir to go help Miles.

=== Beyond the Spider-Verse ===
In June 2023, Lord and Miller stated that Gwen would meet variants of herself in Beyond the Spider-Verse, calling one particular variant "plot-integral" to the film. In January 2024, Lord stated that the film would further explore the emotional connections of Miles' relationships with the other characters in the film, including Gwen, Peter B. Parker, and his parents. During Sony's CinemaCon panel in late March 2025, a preview of Beyond featured Gwen riding a motorcycle with Miles. Additionally, Sony released 5 images in early April 2025, one of them featuring Gwen talking to Miles in Hobie's dimension. In early April 2026, Sony showed footage at CinemaCon of Gwen crossing an interdimensional bridge.

=== Spider-Woman ===
In November 2018, Sony began developing a spin-off film under the name Spider-Woman, focused on three generations of female, Spider-related characters. Gwen was expected to be one of these characters, though no final decision had been made. The project's female focus was attributed to the #MeToo movement and the successful DC Comics film Wonder Woman (2017), which already inspired other female superhero films. The next month, Pascal confirmed that Gwen would be featured in the film alongside Cindy Moon / Silk and Jessica Drew, and said that Across the Spider-Verse would serve as a "launching pad" for the film since it also includes Gwen. Pascal and producer Avi Arad reaffirmed that the film was in development in May 2023, when Arad said it would be made sooner than expected, to star Steinfeld as Gwen in the lead role.

In February 2026, Kristine Belson and Damien de Froberville reconfirmed that Spider-Woman was being developed alongside another spin-off starring Spider-Punk. It was reportedly referred to as Spider-Gwen and predicted to be released after Beyond the Spider-Verse.

== Development ==
=== Background ===
Gwen is based on the character of the same name who debuted in 2014, in the second issue of the Edge of Spider-Verse comic title. Each issue of the title had a different creative team, with Gwen's issue being helmed by Jason Latour and Robbi Rodriguez. Part of the larger "Spider-Verse" storyline, the issue portrayed an alternate universe version of Gwen Stacy, who was killed in Marvel Comics' main universe continuity, known as Earth-616. The alternate universe in which Gwen becomes Spider-Woman is designated as Earth-65. Readers of the character's comics commonly refer to her as Spider-Gwen, though the character is officially known as Ghost-Spider.

Instead of an origin story, Latour and Rodriguez opted to explore the character's history in a two-page "Previously" spread. In it, Gwen was established as a teen drummer who was bitten by a radioactive spider, before taking on the Spider-Woman persona to indulge in an adrenaline buzz. Peter Parker, meanwhile, is Gwen's best friend in this continuity. She defends Peter from bullies, but he creates a serum that transforms him into the Lizard, wishing to be "special" like her. Not realizing Peter is the Lizard, she accidentally kills him in battle.

As the "Spider-Verse" storyline proved popular, demand for a title centered on Earth-65's Gwen Stacy was high, leading to the Spider-Gwen ongoing comic book series beginning in February 2015, and concluding in July 2018 (since followed by a succession of stand-alone limited-run miniseries).

=== Adaptation ===
Shortly prior to the launch of Spider-Gwen, the November 2014 hack of Sony Pictures—the studio owning the film rights to Spider-Man characters—revealed emails among Sony executives discussing a planned animated Spider-Man comedy film to be written by Phil Lord and Christopher Miller. At CinemaCon in April 2015, Sony Pictures chair Tom Rothman announced the animated film's release date as being set for July 20, 2018. Before Gwen's appearance in the Spider-Verse films, the character was adapted in the animated television series Ultimate Spider-Man, making her screen debut in 2016.

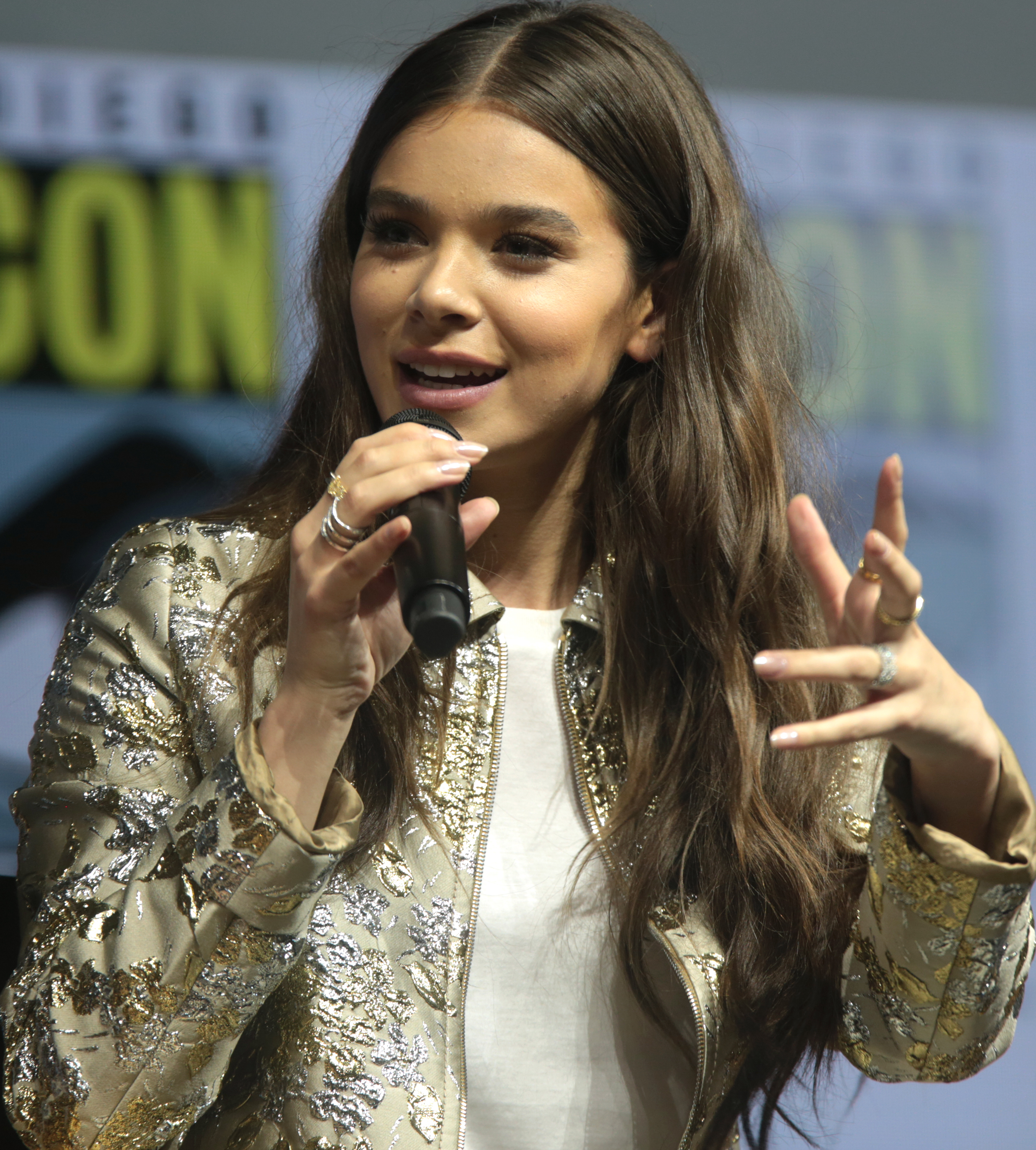
Hailee Steinfeld (pictured in 2018) voices Gwen in the films

Gwen was originally set to appear in the film as a love interest of Miles Morales', but this idea was scrapped as her character transitioned into becoming friends with him in the film, as well as having a more prominent role as a hero, though the credible expressed interest in the concept being returned to in a future sequel. A co-producer on Into the Spider-Verse, Christina Steinberg was noted by Vanity Fair as responsible for this development, with Lord being quoted stating, "I will say that [Steinberg] kept us honest. As five boys making a movie, it was really good to have another filmmaker there going, 'I don't think you guys want to do it like this'".

In December 2017, the film's first teaser was released, officially unveiling its title as Spider-Man: Into the Spider-Verse. Sony later released the film's official trailer on June 6, 2018, which included Gwen at the end, confirming Hailee Steinfeld was cast as Spider-Gwen. Steinfeld had already been linked to the film, but her role in the project was previously unknown. Following this, Gwen further appeared in the film's marketing material including TV spots.

Gwen's return in a potential sequel was indicated, according to Polygon via the flash of her dimension's color scheme at the end of the first film. Development for the sequel was announced in November 2018, prior to the first film's release, and its release date was originally confirmed for April 2022. This was ultimately pushed back to June 2, 2023. Though not being given a full script during the sequel's production, Steinfeld shared she recorded voice lines for it over a period of four years beginning shortly after Into's release. For Across, the character's role was expanded to the point many outlets considered her a "second lead" or "full-fledged protagonist" in her own right. Indeed, the beginning and end of the films are narrated by Gwen, with much of the film presented from her perspective. For scenes involving Gwen and her father, Steinfeld was able to record in the same room with the latter's voice actor, Shea Whigham. Steinfeld specifically asked to record in the same room as her co-stars, not having done so for Into the Spider-Verse but hearing that Miles' voice actor Shameik Moore had. Being able to record with Whigham, Moore, and Issa Rae (voice of Jess Drew), Steinfeld commented "There's nothing like that real-time banter and human interaction, and bless our sound department, but a little overlap never hurt anybody too bad. So it was really special to have the authenticity of a real-life conversation". Lord and Miller also noted the process Steinfeld employed during production, stating she would offer detailed lists of edits and improvements she could make to line recordings. Regarding Gwen's expanded role in Across, Chris Miller explained that the team wanted the audience to better understand her psychologically through her vulnerabilities, struggles and issues, noting that in the first movie she appeared "cool and confident and got it all figured out" from Miles's point of view.

=== Design ===
Spider-Verse's Gwen deliberately draws much inspiration from the comics. Production designer on Into and director on Across Justin K. Thompson was "adamant that Gwen had to reflect the Robbi Rodriguez art style from the comic", stating that he wanted her to be "the most capable of all the Spider-People", adding that "there's a power and sophistication and poise in her". Into the Spider-Verse's art director, Dean Gordon, elaborated on Gwen being "like a ghost when she's in her costume", stating "she does react to light, but much less so than other characters do. She maintains an almost white silhouette with black accents."

Into the Spider-Verse production art of Gwen Stacy by Naveen Selvanathan

In Into the Spider-Verse, she is depicted with a slim build, blue eyes, a piercing near her eyebrow, and short blonde hair, "chopped to the side after Miles accidentally got his hand stuck on it because he could not control his powers". Her costume implements "elements of femininity" as its black portion "is designed to look like a dress". Her visual design borrows elements from her comics appearances. Having a distinct color palette from established Spider-Man schemes, the black, white, purple, and neon blue costume she wears originates from her comics design, created by Latour, Rodriguez, and colorist Rico Renzi. Gwen's outfit is also hooded and features her wearing a white mask. For her appearance in the film, character designer Shiyoon Kim stated that the animation team's goal "was to make Gwen stand out from the visual archetypes associated with female characters in animation". Kim elaborated that Gwen "is not just a pretty blonde girl with your typical thin princess body. We wanted her to look like a ballet dancer — tall, muscular, and powerful". Kim also stated that a sculpt was done based on sketches by Andrea Blasich, with visual development artist Omar Smith creating the final design. Additionally, Gwen wears pointe shoes and makes various references to being a ballet dancer. The end credits sequence of the film features multiple versions of Gwen dancing in a ballet troupe. Her pointe shoes differ from the Chucks she sports in comic appearances, with Latour expressing that the change helps display grace and control in her movements when compared to the film's other heroes.

In Across the Spider-Verse, she is depicted with added pink hair highlights, confirmed by Across the Spider-Verse production designer Patrick O'Keefe in January 2024 to have been adapted from Gwenpool (as illustrated by Gurihiru for The Unbelievable Gwenpool: Beyond the Fourth Wall) by artist Peter Chan, with the design of Gwen's bedroom taking influence from the color palette of Gwenpool's hospital gown.

Gwen hugging her father in Across the Spider-Verse, displaying her "mood ring".

Gwen's home dimension of Earth-65 is featured in Across the Spider-Verse. Described by the filmmakers as a "mood ring" reflecting Gwen's emotions, the world's colors and transitions are "not literal", with its details dependent on Gwen's feelings. Carlos Aguilar of the New York Times wrote that "for example, if [Gwen] feels angry, the screen turns red and the atmosphere hotter. And when confusion overtakes her, the world becomes fragmented". Thompson cited Cinderella, the 1950 Disney film, as serving as a reference in this regard. The visual effect results in "watercolor-like hues that drip and morph in reaction to Gwen". Gwen's world in the film is inspired by elements of Rodriguez's artwork and Renzi's colors from the original Spider-Gwen run. Furthermore, Miller explained that the style of Gwen's dimension was heavily inspired by the covers of Spider-Gwen. The Spider-Verse filmmakers wanted Gwen's motions to resemble a gymnast's, with animator Spencer Wan pitching to make her swinging animations incorporate banned gymnastics moves.

=== Characterization ===
Portrayed as mature for her age in Into the Spider-Verse, Gwen is "very competent in hand to hand combat, very agile, and smart", and also serves as a mentor of sorts to Miles.

Miles and Gwen were planned to have a romance in the first film, but this was scrapped with Phil Lord stating that it "just didn’t feel as good as watching them become friends." This was done in order to build Gwen up as her own individual character, as well as to explore her and Miles's growing friendship instead of focusing on traditional romance. Even with the changes, some romantic tension would still remain in the final screenplay; inspired by the Marvel Comics storyline "Sitting in a Tree", where the comic book Gwen and Miles discover an alternate future dimension where the two are married and have children, though they decide not to date in the present-day.

Though plot points about Gwen and Miles' romantic relationship were ultimately cut from Into, they were included in the film's sequel, Spider-Man: Across the Spider-Verse. Scenes developing this relationship were inspired by "Sitting in a Tree". The sequel's filmmakers were also conscious of Gwen's arc paralleling Miles', with her "serving as a mirror at times" for him. Chris Miller would describe the two as "kindred spirits", expressing a desire for their interactions to not be "overtly romantic". Furthermore, Lord and Miller explained that Across explores "tension between the romantic possibilities for Gwen and Miles, and their desire to keep their friendship intact, and not to risk it". According to Hailee Steinfeld, Gwen is one of Miles' biggest believers despite her fears, claiming that she "believes in him more than most people and she wants him to go off and be his own person and do what she knows he’s capable of, yet she wants to do it together and that’s not really an option". Additionally, both Steinfeld and Shameik Moore have expressed belief that Gwen and Miles would be together if their circumstance was different, with Moore stating that "the only thing stopping them is the hurdles, the challenges, but it’s also what’s gonna make them super strong.” and Steinfeld claiming that "they have each other to lean on. But there’s a lot of responsibility that they each have that they have to ultimately get back to.” Justin K. Thompson has described Miles and Gwen as seeing each other as the "one person in any dimension who can understand each other".

Lord and Miller sought to include a mentor for Gwen in Across the Spider-Verse, leading to the inclusion of Jess Drew (also known as Spider-Woman), a composite character of the Earth-616 Spider-Woman and the Earth-1610 Ultimate Spider-Woman. Her arc in the sequel is seen by its filmmakers as mirroring that of Miles', with director Joaquim Dos Santos stating, "[Gwen] already was a character that played everything really, really close to her chest. She has to learn sort of the opposite end of what Miles is going through, [such as] doing things not only to protect herself, but this other family that she's taken in". Her being a fugitive from the law in the Spider-Verse films is also an element drawn from the comics Edge of Spider-Verse and Spider-Gwen.

== Analysis ==
Gwen's development from Into to Across has been analyzed by film writers. Rory Piñata of MovieWeb wrote that upon the end of the film, when she reconnects with her father, "her dark, pastel shadows melt into his golden rays," signifying for the first time for the viewers that they are following Gwen as the main character of the film.

Writing for Collider, Gregory Mysogland wrote on the contrasting elements of Gwen's appearances at the beginning and ending of Across. Mysogland wrote that "unrelenting and loud music plays over all the disparate images [of Gwen's drumming], uniting the painful emotions they provoke in Gwen, and consequently, the viewer", while also commenting that the film's rapid editing and vibrating camerawork during this sequence creates "disorienting effect" for the viewer, immersing them in Gwen's "feelings of frustration, anxiety, and heartbreak". Mysogland contrasted this with the end of the film, in which Gwen resolves to help Miles, "encouraged by her reconciliation with her father". The shots of her leading a team of Spider-People "are accompanied by a classically heroic score, which, while enthusiastic, is nowhere near as loud or aggressive as the opening drum playing". Mysogland added that the scene's calmer editing and direction when compared to the opening help to convey that Gwen has at least partially overcome emotional challenges to end the film with a "clear, positive path forward".

=== Allegory for trans identity ===
The transgender pride flag: Its explicit inclusion in Across the Spider-Verse is one factor in the discussion of Gwen's story being interpreted as an allegory for trans identity

Much has been written about Gwen's story being a metaphor for the transgender experience, particularly after her appearance in Across the Spider-Verse. The film does not discuss if Gwen herself is trans, nor have its creators spoken on Gwen's identity in this regard. However, audiences and media writers interpreted Gwen's arc in the sequel as an allegory for trans identity, with some even suggesting Gwen may be trans or subtextually coded as such. One such subtext includes Gwen's line that her parents "only know half of who I am", which she shares with Miles.

The film does however include explicit references to trans culture, namely a shot of Gwen's bedroom wall, on which a transgender flag with text reading "Protect trans kids" was hung up. Some viewers believe Gwen's father can also be briefly seen wearing a trans pin. However, the colors may be incidental, due to the color filter used during the scene, with the pin perhaps being a police medal instead. Indeed, the film's color palette often features Gwen "draped" in the colors of the transgender flag: pink, blue, and white. However, CNN cited a viewer who conversely argued that these colors were already used for the comics version of the character, and thus were not necessarily proof that the movie version is trans. Alex Abad-Santos of Vox wrote that "these colors are especially pronounced when Gwen is in her own world, where the artistic conceit is that the colors around her reflect her feelings". One key scene featuring Gwen discussing her secret identity as Spider-Woman to her father features the colors prominently, with Amelia Hansford of PinkNews writing that "Gwen and the environment around her are practically drenched" in them. Hansford added that the scene was seen by many as a metaphor for coming out; she wrote that in her world, Gwen's Spider-Woman persona is judged, misunderstood, and despised, causing her to hide her true identity from society.

CNN's Leah Asmelash cited comics writer Zoe Tunnell as stating the hinting of Gwen as trans in the film was "as subtle as a brick". Tunnell added that the filmmakers showcased Gwen's story arc "in a way that was clearly intended to resonate and support with many of our lives, both thematically and symbolically" through the usage of the trans pride flag's color palette. Isaiah Colbert of Kotaku wrote that "some Spider-Verse viewers feel that her character arc, which includes a painful coming-out of sorts to her father, functions as a trans allegory. And the visual motifs that the film employs during this pivotal scene only serve to drive home that interpretation". Abad-Santos added that "In Across the Spider-Verse, one of the core ideas is that anyone can be a version of Spider-Man. This helps to further the LGBTQ allegory". Gavia Baker-Whitelaw, writing for The Daily Dot, called "the subtext behind Gwen's arc [...] glaringly obvious", opining that "it's both unfair and wrongheaded to dismiss a trans-coded interpretation just because it's based on things like color palette and metaphor."

== Reception ==
In the book The Superhero Multiverse: Readapting Comic Book Icons in Twenty-First-Century Film and Popular Media, James C. Taylor called Gwen's inclusion in Into the Spider-Verse "particularly significant", "in regard to opening up the Spider-Man franchise to female characters". Taylor added that Gwen's characterization in the film "resists" a marginalization of superheroines, writing that "although her role is largely a supporting one in a male character's narrative she refuses to play the part of love interest, deflecting Morales' romantic advances". Adam B. Vary of BuzzFeed also praised the film for its refusal to place Gwen into a love interest role, noting that the focus on friendship between Miles and Gwen helped to emphasize how she is "more capable and more accomplished than Miles — and possibly destined for her own movie".

Gwen's expanded role in the sequel was praised by film critics. Germain Lussier of Gizmodo wrote that "One thing is very clear from the very first scene. This is not simply a Miles Morales movie. It's a Gwen Stacy movie too," and added that the film would prompt viewers to become a fan of Gwen's if they were not already. Collider's Caleb Fesmire called Gwen one of the sequel's "greatest strengths" and opined that the film giving her more of a role helped argue in favor of Gwen deserving a stand-alone film of her own. Fesmire added that "Gwen was already a strong character in Into the Spider-Verse," calling her "effortlessly cool and competent, serving as a foil for the less confident Miles," while providing praise for Steinfeld's performance. Fesmire also praised the visual design of Earth-65, writing that "perhaps the simplest argument for giving Gwen a solo movie is simply how good Gwen's world, Earth-65, looks in Across the Spider-Verse," calling it "gorgeously impressionistic".

Jess' mentorship of Gwen in Across the Spider-Verse was also praised by Caitlin Chappell of Comic Book Resources (CBR), who wrote that "while audiences do not see much of Gwen's mentorship under Jess, the impact she has on Gwen is outstanding. Gwen has learned a few tricks from Jess, but what truly stands out is Gwen's knowledge of the Spider-Verse". Daniel Chin of The Ringer provided praise for a scene featuring Gwen and Miles in Across the Spider-Verse, writing that them "spending time atop the Williamsburgh Savings Bank Tower, gazing on an inverted New York City skyline as they hang upside down together, make some of the most lasting impressions [in the film]".

=== Response to trans allegory interpretations ===
Audience response to interpretations of Gwen as trans or of her story as an allegory for trans identity was positive, according to writers and media outlets covering the film. Hansford wrote that "Whether Gwen Stacy is trans, an ally or simply a metaphor for the trans experience, many fans have praised the inclusion of a trans-coded superhero overcoming adversity in a world hellbent on suppressing her". Asmelash, Colbert, and IGN's Alex Stedman all cited one fan who wrote "Trans (and even cis) fans have every right to say Gwen Stacy is trans, even if the movies never outright confirm it. You can't deny that it's been hinted at. The fact is— if she can make somebody feel represented, who are you to tell them they're wrong?" Avery Kaplan of Popverse wrote that even if Gwen is cis, she can still be relatable for trans viewers, referring to a scene "in which [Gwen and Miles] express how deeply they empathize with one another in spite of the seemingly different nature of their respective circumstances. The unqualified empathy between the two leading characters in spite of their disparate origins – they're literally from different dimensions – embodies one of the key themes of the Spider-Verse concept".

Though fan and media response did include positive reactions to this interpretation, some viewers pushed back on the idea. Baker-Whitelaw wrote that "as more viewers began to discuss this interpretation on social media, it provoked a variety of reactions—both with predictable transphobic backlash and in a more complicated debate about whether queer/trans subtext is a cop-out compared to 'real' representation". Tunnell was cited as having received hateful responses and death threats, to which she expressed that "support and solidarity" with transgender individuals is of high importance due to "the fact that people are so rabid and hateful about the sheer concept of a character being trans, or even just a strong trans ally".

Additionally, several theaters in Muslim-majority countries in the Middle East abruptly pulled their scheduled screenings of the film, set for release in the region on June 22, 2023. Though no official or explicit bans of the film's release were issued, many speculated that the film failed to pass regional censorship requirements due to its brief visual references to the transgender flag.

== See also ==
- List of Spider-Man films cast members
- Spider-Gwen
