= Jorge Molina (comics) =

Mexican comic book artist (born 1984)

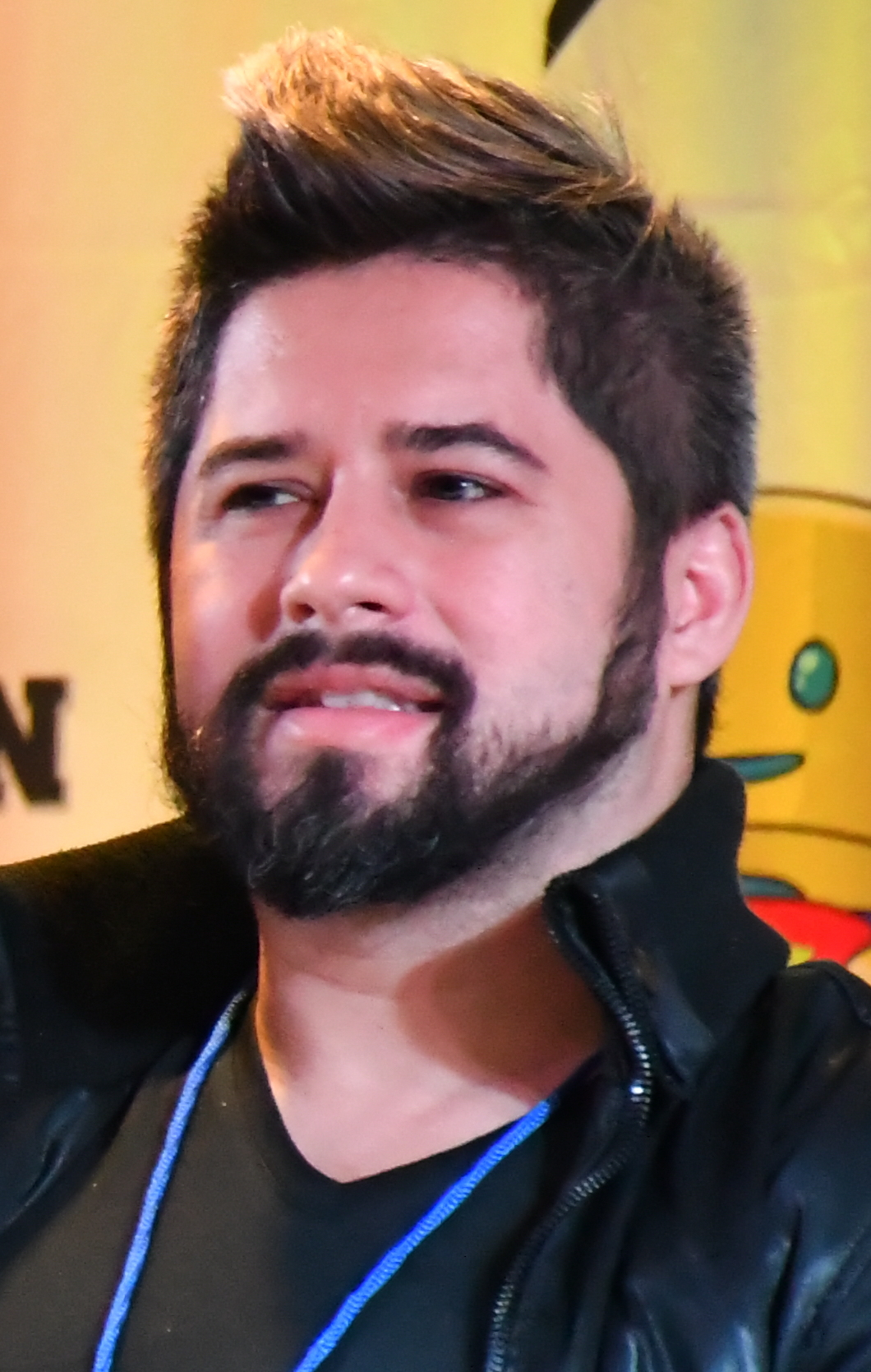
- Molina at the Paradise City Comic Con in 2018
- Born: 1984 (age 41–42) Mérida, Yucatán, Mexico
- Area: Artist
- Notable works: Spider-Geddon; Star Wars

Jorge Molina is a comic book artist best known for his works at Marvel such as Spider-Geddon.

== Career ==
Molina showed a big passion in comics since an early age and dreamed of working on anything related to drawing super heroes. Molina, being started working in the industry has done video games, comics, clothing design and product design for companies like UDON, Image, Top Cow, DC Comics, Crystal Dynamics, ROCK STAR and Buzz Monkey.

In 2018, Molina began drawing Spider-Geddon with writer Christos Gage.

== Bibliography ==
- Amazing Spider-Man #1.4 (Marvel, 2016)
- Avengers: The Initiative #34 (Marvel, 2010)
- A-Force #1-4 (Marvel, 2016)
- Spider-Geddon #1-2, 4-5 (Marvel, 2018)
- Star Wars #23 (Marvel, 2016)
- Thor #5-6 (Marvel, 2014)
- X-Men Blue #1-3, #13-15, #23-25, #31 (Marvel, 2018)
- X-Men: Manifest Destiny - Nightcrawler #1 (Marvel, 2009)
- X-Men: Legacy #248 (Marvel, 2011)
- What If? Secret Wars #1 (Marvel, 2008)
- World War Hulks: Spider-Man & Thor #1-2 (Marvel, 2010)
- Wolverine and the X-Men Annual #1 (Marvel, 2013)

=== Covers only ===
- Avengers Assemble #19-21 (Marvel, 2013)
- Generations: Wolverine & All-New Wolverine #1 (Marvel, 2017)
- Spider-Geddon #3 (Marvel, 2018)
- New Mutants #34 (Marvel, 2009)
