= The Six Arms Saga =

Marvel Comics storyline

- Cover of The Amazing Spider-Man vol. 1, 101 (Oct 1971), art by Gil Kane
- Publisher: Marvel Comics
- Publication date: September – November 1971
- Genre: Superhero
- Title(s): The Amazing Spider-Man #100–102
- Main character(s): Spider-Man; Morbius, the Living Vampire; The Lizard

Creative team
- Writer(s): Stan Lee; Roy Thomas
- Penciller: Gil Kane
- Inker: Frank Giacoia
- Letterer: Art Simek

"The Six Arms Saga" is a story arc featuring the popular Marvel Comics character Spider-Man, written by Stan Lee and drawn by Gil Kane. It spans the issues The Amazing Spider-Man #100–102 (1971) and features the first appearance and origin story of Morbius, the Living Vampire. The story arc is mostly remembered for Spider-Man growing four extra arms, and for a subsequent What If...? stating that keeping the arms would have allowed Spider-Man to save Gwen Stacy and defeat Thanos himself.

The Six-Armed Spider-Man appears in Spider-Man: Across the Spider-Verse.

== Plot ==
Peter Parker has recently experienced a lot of misery in his life: his best friend Harry Osborn has become a junkie, his close friend Captain George Stacy died in his arms, and Gwen Stacy – Peter's girlfriend – wrongly blamed Spider-Man for her father's death. He creates a serum to remove his spider powers, after which he then falls into a troubled sleep in which he fights all his enemies, while enduring excruciating side pains. The dream ends with George Stacy's spirit imploring Peter to keep protecting New York as Spider-Man, stating that his powers are both a blessing and a curse. When he wakes up, Peter realizes that the serum has unintentionally augmented his powers, giving him four additional arms.

After rejecting an invitation to a movie from Gwen, and a late-night photo assignment from the Daily Bugle, Peter, as Spider-Man, calls Curt Connors for help, who offers him his summer house as refuge. Elsewhere, Michael Morbius is found stranded in the ocean by a boat and taken aboard, only for numerous passengers to mysteriously disappear. When the crew confronts him, Morbius attacks them and flees. As night falls and the crew goes to sleep, Morbius, now resembling a vampire, returns and feeds on their blood, but is overwhelmed by guilt and attempts to kill himself by jumping into the ocean. He washes ashore and stumbles upon Connors' house, which he enters before falling asleep. Meanwhile, Spider-Man is working on curing himself in Connors' lab when he smashes a test tube in frustration, causing Morbius to be awakened by the noise and attack. As the two fight, Connors arrives and the stress of being attacked by Morbius causes him to transform into the Lizard.

Morbius and the Lizard fight over who will kill Spider-Man. Morbius manages to bite the Lizard before escaping. An enzyme in Morbius' blood allows Connors to temporarily regain control of his mind, and he joins forces with Spider-Man to track down Morbius, believing that his blood can help cure them both. Meanwhile, Morbius reflects on how he became a vampire following a failed experiment that he, his fiancée, Martine Bancroft, and his assistant worked on to cure Morbius' rare blood disease; he killed his assistant before jumping into the ocean, not wanting to hurt Martine. As Spider-Man and the Lizard search for Morbius, Gwen and Aunt May worry about Peter, as they haven't heard from him in a while, and J. Jonah Jameson reveals to Robbie Robertson that the Daily Bugle is facing financial problems. Eventually, Spider-Man and the Lizard find Morbius and defeat him, but the vampire ends up falling into the river and disappears. Nonetheless, Spider-Man managed to retrieve a blood sample from him, which he uses to cure both himself and the Lizard.

== Other versions ==
=== Ultimate Marvel ===
In the Ultimate Marvel version of Clone Saga, a clone of Spider-Man has six arms and spider-like physical features, such as fangs around his mouth, additional eyes and spiky hair along his face. The variant cover for Ultimate Spider-Man #100 was based on that of The Amazing Spider-Man #100, in which the saga takes place.

=== Mutant X ===
In the Mutant X universe, Spider-Man still has six arms. The chemical he consumed apparently altered his DNA, since his clone also has six arms.

=== Pestilence ===
Deadpool encounters a version of Spider-Man in a universe which he refers to as "an Age of Apocalypse" (not to be confused with "Age of Apocalypse"). This version of Spider-Man became Pestilence, one of the Horsemen of Apocalypse, and possesses six arms.

=== What If? ===
An issue of What If? had asked "What If Spider-Man had Kept his Six Arms?". Morbius is killed by sharks before a cure for Spider-Man's mutation is found. With his mutation unable to be reversed, Spider-Man becomes a spokesperson for the physically challenged. Mister Fantastic gifts Spider-Man arm sheaths that hides his additional arms in his civilian identity. Spider-Man's extra limbs give him augmented strength and agility, which allows him to save Gwen Stacy's life.

=== Spider-Verse ===
In the run-up to Spider-Verse, after learning that something is crossing dimensions to kill Spider-Men, the Superior Spider-Man (Doctor Octopus' mind possessing Spider-Man's body) assembles a team of the more ruthless surviving Spider-Men to oppose this threat, including a six-armed Spider-Man wearing a costume perfectly adapted to his condition. During the storyline, this version of Spider-Man accompanies Spider-Man Noir to a world where the spider-bite left Peter in a coma, with the six-armed Spider-Man using the serum that gave him his extra arms to cure Peter of his mutation for good. The six-armed Spider-Man is later killed by the Inheritors during a trip to 2099 with Lady Spider and Spider-Man 2099.

== In other media ==
=== Television ===
- "The Six Arms Saga" is adapted into the second season of Spider-Man: The Animated Series, Neogenic Nightmare. In this continuity, the transformation is caused by the same spider-bite that gave Spider-Man his powers and took longer to develop. After the mutation begins, Spider-Man first asks Professor X and the X-Men for aid, but they are unable to help. Spider-Man then turns to Dr. Mariah Crawford, but his initial attempt at a cure results in him growing four arms. After fighting the Punisher, Michael Morbius, and the NYPD, the accelerated mutation causes Spider-Man to mutate into Man-Spider. Kraven the Hunter and Punisher capture Man-Spider and deliver him to Crawford, who restores him to normal. In the two-part series finale, "Spider Wars", Spider-Man teams up with multiple alternate reality versions of himself assembled by the Beyonder and Madame Web, including a Spider-Man who was still dealing with his mutation crisis and eventually transforms into Man-Spider during their mission. The Beyonder later teleports Man-Spider back to his home dimension so he can receive help.
- The Six Arms Saga is alluded to in Ultimate Spider-Man. In the episode "The Savage Spider-Man", Spider-Man is poisoned by Taskmaster and transforms into Man-Spider before he is cured by Ka-Zar. Additionally, an alternate universe version of Man-Spider appears in the episode "Return to the Spider-Verse (Pt. 4)".
- The six-armed Spider-Man makes a non-speaking cameo appearance in the What If...? episode "What If... What If?".

=== Film ===
- "The Six Arms Saga" serves as loose inspiration for Morbius.
- The six-armed Spider-Man makes a non-speaking cameo appearance in Spider-Man: Across the Spider-Verse as a member of the Spider-Society.

=== Video games ===
The six-armed Spider-Man appears as a playable character in Spider-Man Unlimited.
