= Spider-Verse =

Marvel Comics series spanning multiple Spider-Man universes

- Cover of The Amazing Spider-Man #9 (January 2014), a.k.a. "Spider-Verse, Part One". Art by Olivier Coipel.
- Publisher: Marvel Comics
- Publication date: November 2014 – February 2015
- Genre: Superhero; Crossover
Title(s)
- The Amazing Spider-Man #4–15
- Spider-Man 2099 #5–8
- Superior Spider-Man #32–33
- Spider-Verse #1–2
- Spider-Verse Team-Up #1–3
- Spider-Woman #1–4
- Edge of Spider-Verse #1–5
- Scarlet Spiders #1–3
- Free Comic Book Day 2014 (Guardians of the Galaxy)
- Main characters: Spider-Man; Superior Spider-Man; Spider-Woman; Silk; Kaine; Spider-Gwen; Spider-Ham; Spider-UK; Spider-Punk; Spider-Bitch; Spider-Girl (Anya Corazon); Spider-Man (Miles Morales); Spider-Man (William); Spider-Woman (Black Widow); Spider-Man 2099; Spider-Man Noir; Spider-Girl (May "Mayday" Parker); Spider-Man (Pavitr Prabhakar); Spider-Man (Takuya Yamashiro); Disney's 2010s Animated Spider-Man; Inheritors (Morlun)

Creative team
- Writer: Dan Slott
- Pencillers: Olivier Coipel; Giuseppe Camuncoli
- Inkers: Wade Von Grawbadger; Cam Smith
- Colorist: Justin Ponsor

"Spider-Verse" is a comic book series issued by Marvel Comics since 2014. Its first major event/storyline started on November 5 in The Amazing Spider-Man (2014) #9 along with an individual issue named Spider-Verse Team-Up. This event took 20 publications to be completed and featured nearly every variant of Spider-People and Spider-Man that had appeared in the comics and other media in the over fifty years since Spider-Man's creation, all under attack by Morlun and his family, the Inheritors. This first major storyline, however, was preceded by a semi-anthological Edge of Spider-Verse series, which served to introduce some new and old characters that would lead the event, such as Spider-Gwen (new), and Miguel O’Hara (old).

The comic book series has received generally positive reviews and proved to be one of the most popular comics related to Spider-Man universe in recent history. Following the conclusion of the event in Amazing Spider-Man No. 14, several characters introduced in it such as Spider-Gwen became prominent figures in Marvel Comics, with some featured in titles of their own. Several of the Spider-Men from this event reunited for the second volume of Spider-Verse set during the Secret Wars and continued to operate together in the Web Warriors series. The 2017 event "Venomverse" was structured in a similar way to Spider-Verse, featuring alternative versions of Venom instead. In 2018, a direct sequel to Spider-Verse titled Spider-Geddon was released, followed in 2019 by Spider-Verse: Spider-Zero. Another Spider-Verse storyline—End of the Spider-Verse—ran from 2022 to 2023, following the release of an ongoing Edge of Spider-Verse series which introduced even more new alternate versions of Spider-Man, followed by the spin-off series Spider-Society, Spider-Man: Octo-Girl, and Spider-Boy, and then a joint crossover storyline—Spider-Verse vs. Venomverse—in 2025.

Spider-Verse also served as the primary inspiration behind many other stories in external media centered around bringing together alternate versions of Spider-Man. This includes seasons 3 and 4 of the Ultimate Spider-Man animated series, as well as the 2018 animated film Spider-Man: Into the Spider-Verse and its sequels Across the Spider-Verse (2023) and Beyond the Spider-Verse (2027), and the 2021 Marvel Cinematic Universe film Spider-Man: No Way Home, the latter featuring three of the live-action film versions of Peter Parker.

== Publication history ==
The premise of a crossover was conceived by Dan Slott, who wrote the core part of the story in The Amazing Spider-Man (vol. 3) #9–15, after working on the 2010 video game Spider-Man: Shattered Dimensions which featured the mainstream, Ultimate, Noir and 2099 versions of Spider-Man. The last two episodes of Spider-Man: The Animated Series, about multiple Spider-Men going across dimensions fighting villains, also served as inspiration. Slott's experience in Shattered Dimensions left him thinking that rather than a plot having four Spider-Men, it should have all the Spider-Men in existence. Slott's idea was originally postponed to make room for the 2012 Spider-Men storyline by Brian Michael Bendis, which featured the first meeting of the original Peter Parker, and Miles Morales of the Ultimate Universe. Slott was allowed to use any of the existing Spider-Man versions save for the ones of the Marvel Zombies metaseries, Spider-Boy (due to being co-owned by DC Comics) and any Spider-Man co-owned by Sony Pictures, like Tobey Maguire's version, the version of Spider-Man: The New Animated Series, the version of The Spectacular Spider-Man and Andrew Garfield's version. Beginning in August 2014, the event was preceded by two new issues of the cancelled The Superior Spider-Man, issues of Spider-Man 2099 and a five-issue run of one-shots, all under the Edge of Spider-Verse banner.

=== Titles involved ===
Title	Issue(s)	Ref.
Prelude
Guardians of the Galaxy	FCBD 2014	
The Amazing Spider-Man (vol. 3)	#4–6	
Edge of Spider-Verse
Edge of Spider-Verse	#1–5	
Spider-Man 2099 (vol. 2)	#5	
The Superior Spider-Man	#32–33	
The Amazing Spider-Man (vol. 3)	#7–8	
Core series
The Amazing Spider-Man (vol. 3)	#9–15	
Tie-in issues
Scarlet Spiders	#1–3	
Spider-Man 2099 (vol. 2)	#6–8	
Spider-Verse (vol. 2)	#1–2	
Spider-Verse Team-Up	#1–3	
Spider-Woman (vol. 5)	#1–4	

== Plot ==
The various Spider-Men that appear in the storyline, art by Gabriele Dell'Otto

=== Prelude ===
On Earth-311, Peter Parquagh is on stage at the Globe Theater when Morlun appears. Peter attempts to defend himself, but Morlun proves too powerful and absorbs Peter's life essence. Before disappearing into another dimension, Morlun declares that all spiders will die. Shortly after his death, his universe was destroyed.

=== Edge of Spider-Verse ===
==== Edge of Spider-Verse: Superior Spider-Man ====
The Superior Spider-Man (Doctor Octopus' mind in Spider-Man's body) is pulled via a time warp into the year 2099. Superior Spider-Man attempts to return home, but instead travels to alternate Earths, where he finds the bodies of alternate Spider-Men, all slain by similar double-puncture wounds. He decides to assemble an army of Spider-Men to fight the killer.

The Superior Spider-Man and his new team (Spider-Man Noir, the Six-Armed Spider-Man, Spider-Monkey, Ashley Barton and the Assassin Spider-Man) set an ambush for Karn, which backfires when Karn reveals he is unaffected by their weapons. The team is only able to escape when Karn's brother and sister Brix and Bora arrive, and fight among themselves.

==== Edge of Spider-Verse: Miniseries ====
While battling Mysterio on Earth-90214, Spider-Man Noir is attacked by Karn, but is saved by the timely arrival of the Superior Spider-Man, who takes Noir to the year 2099.

On Earth-65, Gwen Stacy became Spider-Woman, while Peter Parker became the Lizard. Peter died while fighting Gwen, and Spider-Woman is blamed for his death by J. Jonah Jameson and her father, Captain George Stacy. When an assassin makes an attempt on George Stacy's life, Gwen defeats him, but Captain Stacy holds Spider-Woman at gunpoint. Gwen is forced to reveal her face and Captain Stacy tells her to leave while she can. The events are watched by a British Spider-Man called Spider-UK.

In a Japanese anime-like universe, Aaron Aikman uses his spider-based powers in an advanced suit of armor to become the Spider-Man. Years ago, Aaron's old lover Kaori Ikegami found her daughter brain dead after a car accident. Kaori became a recluse, but has now returned claiming that her daughter is awake and possessed by something. Kaori's daughter forces her to kidnap people, possessing those people in turn, and now the possessed are assembling into an army. Aaron suits up, and begins to head out the door. But Morlun appears, and tells him that "this is the end of your story."

On Earth-51412, Patton Parnel is a disturbed young man who lives with his abusive Uncle Ted. Patton "experiments" on animals and spies on his next-door neighbor Sarah Jane. On a trip to Alcorp Industries, Patton is bitten by a red spider. Patton gradually exhibits spider-like behavior, trapping several people (including Uncle Ted) in webs as food sources. When Sarah Jane comes to Patton's house looking for Gene, Patton kisses her, bites her neck, then transforms into a monstrous spider-like creature. Morlun arrives and drains Patton's life force, allowing Sarah Jane to escape.

On Earth-14512, Peni Parker is an Asian school girl whose father piloted the robot SP//dr. SP//dr's pilot is chosen by an intelligent radioactive spider who becomes mentally-linked to the new pilot. After her father dies in battle, Peni take his place. Peni is recruited by Spider-Ham and Old Man Spider to join the fight against Morlun and his family.

==== Edge of Spider-Verse: Spider-Man 2099 ====
Miguel O'Hara from the Exiles begins having visions when the Destiny War Miguel O'Hara is killed. Miguel prepares to flee to Earth-616 where Morlun was once killed. As Morlun kills the Timestorm Spider-Man 2099, Earth-616's Miguel (currently stuck in the 21st century) begins to feel the deaths as well. Just as the Exiles' Miguel is about to make the dimensional jump, Morlun arrives and kills him in front of the Earth-616 Miguel. Miguel realizes he must find Peter Parker.

==== Edge of Spider-Verse: Amazing Spider-Man ====
Billy Braddock a.k.a. Spider-UK is one of the newest recruits of the Captain Britain Corps. Scanning other universes, he sees the deaths of many alternate Spider-Men by the Inheritors. Daemos' brother Jennix detects Billy, who immediately cuts the scanner feed. As Saturnyne and Lady Roma discuss their concerns about the Incursions that are destroying entire universes, Spider-UK tries to tell them about the killings of the Spiders across the multiverse. Saturnyne rebuffs him, but a sympathetic Roma gives Billy a talisman that allows him to travel through the Web of Life to save the remaining Spiders.

On Earth-982, Daemos attacks Spider-Girl (Mayday Parker). Her boyfriend Wes, Peter, and Mary Jane seemingly sacrifice themselves to save her and her baby brother Ben. Spider-UK and Old Man Spider arrive via portal and take her and Benjy away.

=== Main plot ===
On Earth-616, Spider-Man and Silk meet with Spider-Woman, Spider-Girl, Spider-Man 2099, Spider-UK, Spider-Girl of Earth-982, and Spider-Ham. Spider-UK explains they are the Spiders of other dimensions and that all the strands of the Great Web are converging on Earth-616 Peter. Spider-UK tells him Morlun's elder brother Daemos is coming to Earth-616 and all of them head into a portal to another dimension. Peter Parker's clone Kaine Parker (a.k.a. the Scarlet Spider) and other members of the New Warriors are beaten down by Daemos. Kaine stabs Daemos through the chest with his arm spikes, and Daemos realizes that Kaine can hurt him because he is the current receptacle of the Other. Old Man Spider-Man, the Bullet Points Spider-Man, and the Spider-Woman of Earth-65 arrive. Daemos kills the Bullet Points Spider-Man, but the others escape through a portal. They join other Spider-Men gathered on Earth-13, home of Cosmic Spider-Man who never lost the Enigma Force. On Earth-001, the Inheritors gather at a dinner table laden with crippled Spider-Totems. The siblings' father Solus reveals he has known all along where the Bride, the Other, and the Scion are located, then asks his children what the Web of Life and Destiny means to them.

On Earth-1610, Miles Morales and Jessica Drew are attacked by Verna's Hounds, but are saved by the Superior Spider-Man, the Assassin Spider-Man, and Spider-Punk. On Earth-13, Spider-UK gets a reading on Superior Spider-Man's team. Old Man Spider-Man gives Spider-Man one of their devices to travel the Great Web, but insists Silk remain behind, refusing to say why. Silk waits secretly follows the team through the portal, arriving on Earth-928, where Peter is horrified to see the Superior Spider-Man in charge. Old Man Spider-Man explains that Kaine and Silk are the receptacles of Totems called the Other and the Bride. Daemos emerges from a portal and kills the Spider-Cyborg, but the Superior Spider-Man manages to kill Daemos. Spider-Man 2099 uses future technology to put Daemos' corpse in stasis. A second Daemos shows up and kills Old Man Spider-Man and the Assassin Spider-Man. Kaine and Ben Reilly of Earth-94 deduce that the Inheritors are clones, and Ben opens a portal to the Inheritors' home base. The Ultimate Spider-Woman, also a clone of Peter Parker, joins them. Silk steals Spider-Man's portal device and opens a portal while attracting the Inheritors' attention. The surviving Spiders regroup on Earth-13.

Solus mocks Morlun's fear of the Spider-Man of Earth-616. Morlun says he is concerned about the prophecy and that "the Other," "the Bride," and "the Scion" have all manifested. Solus agrees that they could end the Inheritors' reign. On Earth-13, Peter and Otto fight over who is better suited to lead the Spider-Army, and Spider-Man realizes that Otto thinks Peter is from before the mind-swap took place, not after. Spider-Man challenges the Superior Spider-Man to kill him, and the Superior Spider-Man backs down, unwilling to create a time paradox. The Superior Spider-Man reveals he has located the Inheritors' homeworld, but feels that they need a stronger army. Peter asks Spider-Girl, Spider-Woman (Gwen Stacy), Miles Morales, and the Animated Spider-Man to help gather recruits. Morlun and Jennix emerge from portals, killing a version of Captain Spider and Spider-Monkey. Captain Universe Peter Parker of Earth-13 destroys Jennix with the Enigma Force. Solus arrives and reveals that the Enigma Force is pure life force energy on which the Inheritors feed, devouring Cosmic Spider-Man. Morlun kidnaps Benjy Parker from Spider-Girl of Earth-982, declaring him to be the receptacle of the Scion.

The Spiders charge Solus, who easily kills the Prince of Arachne and Arachnosaur. Morlun takes Benjy to Earth-001. Spider-Woman of Earth-65 and Spider-Girl bring in the Mangaverse Spider-Man, Spider-Man J, and Takuya Yamashiro of Earth-51778. Takuya charges Solus, but Solus destroys his giant robot Leopardon. The Safe Zone is lost, and the Spiders open a portal to a random world to escape. Silk, on the run from Brix and Bora, arrives on Earth-3145, a radioactive wasteland. When Brix steps out of the portal, he is nearly killed by the radiation before being pulled to safety. Realizing that the irradiated world is off-limits to the Inheritors, Silk covers herself in web for protection. Spider-Woman (Jessica Drew) infiltrates the Inheritors' base by posing as her Earth-001 self. The Master Weaver reveals a secret rebellion against his captors, giving Jessica scrolls with knowledge of the Other, the Bride, and the Scion. Morlun arrives and gives Benjy to Brix and Bora. Jessica uses her damaged transporter to send the scrolls to Peter before Morlun discovers them. The Spider-Army arrives on Earth-8847, where Spider-Man receives the scrolls and is contacted by Silk. Arriving on Earth-3145, the Spiders follow Cindy to Sims Tower and find the bunker designed to hide them from the Inheritors. Inside, Silk was joined by Earth-3145's spider-totem Uncle Ben.

On Earth-3145, Uncle Ben was bitten by the spider and became Spider-Man, but gave up after the deaths of Aunt May and Peter and accepted Ezekiel Sims' offer to stay in the bunker. The Earth was later destroyed by nuclear weapons, leaving Ben the last man alive. The Superior Spider-Man realizes that Spider-Man is from his future, meaning that Otto will eventually lose everything. Spider-Girl reveals that she can read the mystical scrolls due to her original powers coming from a cult that worships the Master Weaver. She reads a prophecy that the Inheritors will lose to the Spiders, unless by sacrificing the Other, the Bride, and the Scion, which will stop new Spider-Totems from existing. The second scroll contains the life story of Karn, which the Spiders hope can turn him to their side.

On Earth-802, Kaine, Jessica Drew of Earth-1610, and Ben Reilly destroy Jennix's cloning facilities, at the cost of Ben's life. Spider-Man contacts Kaine, who reveals he is on Earth-001. Spider-Man orders the away teams to rendezvous there. Kaine transforms into a massive Man-Spider and impales Solus, killing him. An enraged Morlun stabs Kaine through the head.

Joined by redeemed Karn, the Spiders head to Earth-001 for the final battle against the Inheritors. Miguel O'Hara and Lady Spider arrive with a repaired Leopardon. Spider-Ham disguises himself as Benjy, allowing Ben Parker to take Benjy back to his home reality and robbing the Inheritors off the Scion. The Superior Spider-Man kills the Master Weaver. The Inheritors are exiled to Earth-3145, where they are forced to hide in the Sims bunker to avoid death by radiation, while feeding off the radioactive spiders.

=== Tie-in issues ===
==== Scarlet Spiders ====
Earth-802 is ruled by Jennix of the Inheritors. Ben Reilly of Earth-94, the Scarlet Spider (Kaine), and Jessica Drew, the Black Widow of Earth-1610 travel there to learn the secret of his cloning process and gain access to the Baxter Building. Jennix reveals that he has attempted to clone numerous Spider-Men from across the Multiverse to use as food stock, but has been unable to clone the essence of the spider which the Inheritors feast on. Ben destroys the device which allows the Inheritors to transmit their life force into new bodies, sacrificing himself in the process. Kaine is furious and steals Jessica's teleporter, then heads to Earth-001 to kill the Inheritors.

==== Spider-Man 2099 ====
The Six-Armed Spider-Man, Spider-Man 2099 and steam punk Lady Spider return to 2099 to dissect the clone body of Daemos for clues on how to defeat his brethren. Followed to the future by reborn Daemos, the Six Armed Spider-Man is killed before Miguel traps the Inheritor in a stasis field. Daemos kills himself to escape the trap, so Spider-Man 2099 and Lady Spider teleport back to the safe zone of Earth-13, only to find that it has been destroyed by Solus. They find Leopardon and transport the mecha to Lady Spider's home on Earth-803. After the Six Men of Sinestry attack, Spider-Man 2099 finds uranium in Doctor Octopus' backpack and use it to get Leopardon fully operational for the final Inheritor showdown.

==== Spider-Verse Team-Up ====
On Earth-94, Ben Reilly is still operating as Spider-Man. He is fighting Vultures sent by Verna when Old Man Spider and Spider-Ham arrive. The Spiders are paralyzed by poisoned knives thrown by the Vultures. Ben manages to break free, due to having fought a similar type of control when he was bonded with the Carnage symbiote. The distraction is enough for Old Man Spider and Spider-Ham to break free and escape to Earth-13 with Ben.

On Earth-21205, Verna and her Hounds arrive to hunt Hobgoblin (the identity of this world's Peter Parker). Spider-Woman (Gwen Stacy) arrives to help him. Both shocked, since Spider-Gwen let her Peter die, while Hobgoblin Parker became a vigilante after letting his Gwen die. The two are surrounded and Hobgoblin sacrifices himself to save Gwen and allow her to escape.

Karn comes to Earth-3123 to kill the spider-totem of this reality, where Aunt May was bitten by a radioactive spider and became Spider-Ma'am. Karn is stopped by Spider-Girl, Spider-UK, Spider-Punk, Spider-Man: India, and Ashley Barton of Earth-807128. The Spiders, after revealing intimate details about his history, convince Karn to join them. The Spiders allow him to drain a non-lethal amount of life-force from each of them to satiate his hunger and Karn agrees to join them against the Inheritors.

==== Spider-Woman ====
Spider-Woman followed Silk and Spider-Man Noir to Earth-19231 where they're attacked by Brix and Bora. Spider-Man Noir is wounded, and the trio takes him home to Earth-90214 to recover. Jessica is then sent by Spider-Man to Earth-001 to gather more information on the Inheritors, while Spider-Girl and Spider-Gwen stay to watch Silk, who sneaks away from them. Spider-Woman infiltrates the Inheritors' headquarters by posing as the Jessica Drew of Earth-001, who is also Morlun's lover. Silk is cornered by Brix and Bora, but escapes to nuclear apocalypse Earth-3145. Brix and Bora cannot survive in this universe and Silk enters the Sim bunker, only to find that universe's Spider totem – Uncle Ben. Jessica Drew is invited on a date with Morlun, and uses her pheromones to confuse Morlun and sneaks into the Master Weaver's lair. The weaver gives her an ancient prophesy that contains the key to defeating the Inheritors. Spider-Woman uses her broken teleporter to send the scrolls to Spider-Man. Spider-Gwen, Spider-Girl and Silk arrive to rescue Jessica Drew and help Jessica Drew of Earth-001 become the new benevolent dictator, since all the factions are fighting and only she can unite them.

=== Aftermath ===
After battle, the remainder of the Spider-Army say their goodbyes. Spider-Girl (Mayday Parker) returns home to Earth-982 and finds Uncle Ben Parker from Earth-3145, who reveals that Mary Jane and Wes survived Daemos' attack. Ben decides to stay on Earth-982 and live out the remainder of his life as Mayday's and Benjy's grandfather. Mayday is given her father's old costume and renames herself Spider-Woman. When only Spider-UK, Spider-Woman (Gwen Stacy), Spider-Man 2099, and the Spiders from Earth-616 remain, their Spider-Sense collectively overwhelm them with agony. Karn realizes someone is tampering with the Web of Life and Destiny, and they find the Superior Spider-Man hacking at the Web with Morlun's dagger. Aware of his destiny, Superior Spider-Man rejects his fate, having figured out that Peter Parker from his universe is from the future. Karn says that at any moment he could erase them from existence, while Spider-UK shouts they are losing portals home. Peter tells the Spider-Woman of Earth-65 and Spider-Man 2099 to head to their home dimensions before it is too late, while he leads the Earth-616 Spiders against the Superior Spider-Man. The Superior Spider-Man battles with Spider-Woman and Spider-Girl, who sees the totemic script on Morlun's dagger. Spider-Girl immobilizes the Superior Spider-Man's arm and reads that there will always be a Master Weaver at the center of the Great Web and that anyone can take the place of the current Master Weaver, but only death can free the Master Weaver from their sacred obligation. Karn states that he finally knows who the Master Weaver is and unmasks himself, revealing that he and the Master Weaver are one and the same. Analyzing the Master Weaver's armor, Karn notices a slot that fits the prongs of the spear he made as a child, which acts as a key to open the mechanism. Karn explain that the flow of time differs in Earth-001, using the co-existence of Spider-Man and the Superior Spider-Man as an example of being able to exist in two places at once. Karn has consumed enough Totems for their essence to enable him to take the Master Weaver's place, stating that this shall be his penance and, hopefully, his salvation. Spider-Man defeats the Superior Spider-Man who feigns surrender, but puts his hologram of Anna Marconi on a 100-day standby. Karn says that in time he can fix the damage to the Great Web and prepares to return the Superior Spider-Man to the past. Spider-Man pushes Otto through the portal into the aftermath of the chronoton implosion that time-displaced him in the first place, his memory of the recent events erased. Karn remarks that his family can subsist off the life force of any animal and that Earth-3145 is teeming with mutant spiders. He also reveals that Spider-UK's home Earth-833 was destroyed by an Incursion and the Earth-616 Spiders console him. Spider-UK volunteers to travel the Multiverse and protect the worlds that lost their Spider-Totems, and Spider-Girl offers to join him. Karn dubs them the Warriors of the Great Web and charges them with helping him repair the severed threads. Karn opens a portal to Earth-616 and the Spiders bid farewell. Karn offers the Web-Warriors a tour of the Inheritor's palace, while unbeknown to them, a hand erupts from the Other's corpse, revealing that Kaine is still alive. On Earth-616, Spider-Man says that for a long time he did not feel ready to run his own company, but after leading the Spider-Army he feels ready for anything.

== Reception ==
The main storyline received generally positive reviews, with critics praising the action, art, pacing, and story. However, the ending received some criticism for it being anticlimactic.

According to Comic Book Roundup, Amazing Spider-Man (vol. 3) No. 9 received a score of 8.3/10 based on 32 reviews, issue No. 10 received a score of 7.6/10 based on 16 reviews, issue No. 11 received a score of 8.2/10 based on 16 reviews, issue No. 12 received a score of 7.9/10 based on 20 reviews, issue No. 13 received a score of 7.6/10 based on 15 reviews, issue No. 14 received a score of 7.4/10 based on 21 reviews, and issue No. 15 received a score of 7/10 based on 18 reviews.

In 2015, Bleeding Cool highlighted a "common complaint" of the 648-page hardcover collection: "while the book gives a reading order to read the crossover, that order is not reflected in the book. Instead the individual titles are grouped together, rather than the Infinity Hardcover solution of presenting them in reading order. And because there are no page numbers following the actual reading order can be very hard. Advice given on reviews is to buy some post it notes and insert them throughout the volume for the beginning of individual issues and then refer to the reading order at the beginning".

== Sequels ==
=== Spider-Verse: Secret Wars (2015) ===
As part of the 2015 Secret Wars storyline, a Spider-Verse miniseries was featured on the domain of the Battleworld called Arachnia, starring Spider-Gwen, Spider-Ham, Spider-Man Noir, Spider-Man: India, Spider-UK and Anya Corazon. After the conclusion of Secret Wars, the team renamed itself and was featured in a new series called Web Warriors (a name that was coined by Peter Parker from the Ultimate Spider-Man TV series during the original Spider-Verse).

=== Web Warriors: Protectors of the Spider-Verse (2015–2016) ===
Spider-Verse: Web Warriors / Web Warriors: Spider-Verse, collected as Web Warriors: Protectors of the Spider-Verse, is a 2015–2016 comic book published by Marvel Comics featuring the team of multiple alternative versions of Spider-Man that had formed in Spider-Verse and Secret Wars, called the Web Warriors.

=== Spider-Geddon (2018) ===
Spider-Geddon is a 2018 comic book limited series and crossover storyline published by Marvel Comics featuring multiple alternative versions of Spider-Man that had appeared in various media, and his supporting cast. In this sequel to Spider-Verse, the Inheritors have found a way out of the decimated world they were imprisoned on and are now determined to take their revenge on the Spider-Army and feed on them once again. Spider-Geddon was also marketed as "Revenge of the Spider-Verse". The series was accompanied by a new volume of Edge of Spider-Verse, consisting of the storylines Spider-Man: Noir, Gwen Stacy: Spider-Woman, Aaron Aikman: The Spider-Man, I Walked with a Spider, SP//dr 女性操縱士, Something Wicked This Way Comes, Gig of Nightmares, Average Reluctant Teenage Super Hero, The Last Laugh, and Predator or Prey.

=== Spider-Verse: Spider-Zero (2019) ===
Spider-Verse volume 3 is a 2019 comic book limited series published by Marvel Comics featuring multiple alternative versions of Spider-Man that had appeared in various media, and his supporting cast. The series is much shorter than the original one lasting 6 issues and having no tie-ins, about Miles Morales being recruited by the new Master Weaver Spider-Zero, a survivor of Secret Wars, to save the multiverse, teaming up with Peni Parker and Web-Slinger over SP//dr Reactivated and The Lone Stranger.

=== Spider-Man: End of the Spider-Verse (2022–2023) ===
In May 2022, Marvel announced that Dan Slott would return to helm "what Slott and Marvel are billing as the final Spider-Verse story: Spider-Man: End of the Spider-Verse". This started in August 2022 with a five-issue anthology miniseries with a second volume of Edge of Spider-Verse, which was then followed by the core storyline beginning in October 2022 with the launch of the monthly Spider-Man ongoing by Slott and Mark Bagley. The anthology focuses on new multiversal variants of Spider-Man such as Night-Spider (a variant of Felicia Hardy), Hunter-Spider (a variant of Sergei Kravenoff), and Spider-Laird. Due to the popularity of the two stories, a follow up third, 4-issue volume of Edge of Spider-Verse called "Bleeding Edge" covers the stories Enter: Kravertooth the Hunter, Home Is Where Your Heart Is Cut Out By A Huntsman, Nobody Knows Who You Are, and Here Comes the Rucku.

=== Spider-Society (2025) ===
Another multiverse saga was announced in 2024, but this time led by Aranya and Mademe Web. Aranya leads the titular Spider Society which consists of a team of Spider-Punk, Ghost Spider, Web Weaver, Spider-Man 2099, Miles Morales, Spider-Cat and Spider-Woman from "Across the Spider-Verse" versus a team of villains led by an evil Madame Web and a Gwen Stacy version of Green Goblin. A fourth volume of Edge of the Spider-Verse anthology series was launched as a prelude, consisting of four issues: Edge of Spider-Verse: Weapon VII with the story New Toys; Edge of Spider-Verse: The Spooky-Man with the story The Terrible Horror of the Spooky-Man; Edge of Spider-Verse: Star-Spider with the story A Star (Spider) Is Born; and Edge of Spider-Verse: Spider-Woman, with the story The Hard Road about Jess Drew from the film Spider-Man: Across the Spider-Verse. There was a single tie-in with Web of Spider-Man (vol. 3) #1 and a four-part mini series that concluded the event.

=== Spider-Verse vs. Venomverse (2025) ===
Spider-Verse vs. Venomverse is a 2025 comic book limited series published by Marvel Comics featuring multiple alternative versions of Spider-Man and Venom that had appeared in various media, and their supporting casts, also serving as a continuation of Venomverse, Venomized, and Extreme Venomverse. The series is much shorter than the original one lasting 5 issues and having no tie-ins, written by Mat Groom and Kyle Higgins.

== Collected editions ==
=== Softcover ===
Title	Material collected	Year	ISBN
The Amazing Spider-Man Volume 2: Spider-Verse Prelude	The Amazing Spider-Man (vol. 3) #7–8, Superior Spider-Man 32–33, Free Comic Book Day: Guardians of the Galaxy #1 (five-page Spider-Man story)	January 20, 2015	978-0785187981
Edge of Spider-Verse	Edge of Spider-Verse #1–5	May 12, 2015	978-0785197287
Spider-Woman Volume 1: Spider-Verse	Spider-Woman (vol. 5) #1–4	June 30, 2015	978-0785154587arch
The Amazing Spider-Man Volume 3: Spider-Verse	The Amazing Spider-Man (vol. 3) #9–15	July 28, 2015	978-0785192343
Spider-Man 2099 Volume 2: Spider-Verse	Spider-Man 2099 (vol. 2) #6–12	August 4, 2015	978-0785190806

=== Hardcover ===
Title	Material collected	Pages	Year	ISBN
Spider-Verse	The Amazing Spider-Man (vol. 3) #7–15, Superior Spider-Man #32–33, Free Comic Book Day: Guardians of the Galaxy #1 (five-page Spider-Man story), Spider-Verse (vol. 2) #1–2, Spider-Verse Team-Up #1–3, Scarlet Spiders #1–3, Spider-Woman (vol. 5) #1–4, Spider-Man 2099 (vol. 2) #6–8	648	May 12, 2015 (HC); March 15, 2016 (SC)	978-0785190356 (HC); 978-0785190363 (SC)
Spider-Verse/Spider-Geddon Omnibus	Edge Of Spider-Verse #1–5; Spider-Verse (2014) #1–2; Superior Spider-Man (2013) #32–33; Amazing Spider-Man (2014) #7–15; Spider-Man 2099 (2014) #5–8; Scarlet Spiders #1–3; Spider-Woman (2014) #1–4; Spider-Verse Team-Up #1–3; Edge Of Spider-Geddon #1–4; Spider-Geddon #0–5; Superior Octopus #1; Spider-Force #1–3; Spider-Girls #1–3; Peter Parker, The Spectacular Spider-Man (2017) #311–313; Spider-Gwen: Ghost Spider #1–4; Vault Of Spiders #1–2; Spider-Geddon: Spider-Man Noir Video Comic; Spider-Geddon: Spider-Gwen – Ghost Spider Video Comic; Spider-Geddon: Spider-Man Video Comic; Spider-Geddon Handbook, and material from Free Comic Book Day 2014 (Guardians Of The Galaxy)	1440	February 22, 2023	978-1302947422

== In other media ==
=== Television ===
- The two-part series finale of Spider-Man: The Animated Series, "Spider-Wars" (1994), sees Madame Web and the Beyonder recruiting the "prime" Peter Parker / Spider-Man, a version of Parker who never lost Uncle Ben and lived a perfect life, a version of himself who took Doctor Octopus' arms, a six-armed Spider-Man, an actor playing Spider-Man, and Ben Reilly / Scarlet Spider to save the multiverse from Spider-Carnage. Slott confirmed that this earlier example of different Spider-Totems meeting each other served as inspiration for the "Spider-Verse" comic storyline.
- Ultimate Spider-Man (2012) deals with the concept of the "Spider-Verse" throughout the third and fourth seasons:
  - In the four-part episode "The Spider-Verse" (2015), the Green Goblin uses the Siege Perilous and an unwilling Electro to travel to six alternate universes and gather DNA from their unique Spider-Men, forcing his version of Peter Parker / Spider-Man to pursue him across the multiverse. Along the way, both the Goblin and Spider-Man encounter Spider-Man 2099, Petra Parker / Spider-Girl of a gender-inverted universe, Spider-Man Noir, Spider-Ham, the medieval-themed Spyder-Knight, and Miles Morales. Upon returning to their world, Spider-Man learns the Goblin used the six Spider-Men's DNA to enhance himself and become the "Spider-Goblin". In response, Spider-Man uses the Siege Perilous and Electro to draw in the six Spider-Men he encountered and form the "Web Warriors" to defeat the Goblin and cure him. In doing so, they free Electro, who goes on a rampage before the Web Warriors defeat him and return to their respective home universes.
  - In the episode, "Miles From Home", Morales joins forces with the "prime" Spider-Man to stop the former's version of the Green Goblin and Baron Mordo from stealing the Siege Perilous, which gets shattered and strewn across the multiverse in the process. After finding one of the fragments, a villainous version of Peter Parker called Wolf Spider seeks to collect the rest so he can rule the multiverse.
  - In the four-part episode "Return to the Spider-Verse" (2016), Madame Web, Iron Fist, and Doctor Strange combine their powers to send Parker and Morales through the multiverse once more to retrieve the fragments before Wolf Spider does. Along the way, they encounter old ally Spider-Man Noir, as well as new Spider-Men like the Victorian era-themed Blood Spider, the cartoon pirate Web Beard, the cowboy Web Slinger, and Spider-Gwen, who became the protector of Morales' universe after he was trapped in Parker's. While in Morales and Gwen's universe, the Web Warriors learn Wolf Spider captured all of the multiverse's Spider heroes so he can use the Siege Perilous to absorb their life forces and empower himself further. Realizing Wolf Spider was poisoning himself in the process, the "prime" Spider-Man allows his life force to be absorbed as well, overloading Wolf Spider and shattering him across the multiverse like the Siege Perilous. With their common enemy defeated, the captured Spiders regain their life forces and return to their respective home universes.

=== Film ===
- "Spider-Verse", among other storylines, serves as inspiration for Spider-Man: Into the Spider-Verse (2018), which sees Miles Morales, an older, disheveled version of Spider-Man named Peter B. Parker, Gwen Stacy / Spider-Woman, Spider-Man Noir, Peni Parker / SP//dr, and Spider-Ham joining forces to save their realities from being destroyed by the Kingpin's Super-Collider.
  - Into the Spider-Verse is followed by two sequels, Spider-Man: Across the Spider-Verse, released in 2023, and Spider-Man: Beyond the Spider-Verse, currently scheduled to be released on June 4, 2027. In the former, Morales goes on an adventure across the multiverse with Stacy and a new team of Spider-People, including Miguel O'Hara / Spider-Man 2099, to stop Johnathon Ohnn/The Spot.
- The Marvel Cinematic Universe (MCU) film Spider-Man: No Way Home, features Tobey Maguire and Andrew Garfield reprising their roles as Peter Parker/Spider-Man, dubbed "Peter-Two" and "Peter-Three", from Sam Raimi's Spider-Man trilogy and Marc Webb's The Amazing Spider-Man films, respectively. They meet the MCU's version of Peter Parker (portrayed by Tom Holland) before joining forces to fight and cure the Green Goblin, Doctor Octopus, Sandman, the Lizard, and Electro.

=== Video games ===
- Spider-Man: Shattered Dimensions, written by Dan Slott before he wrote "Spider-Verse", features the Earth-616, Marvel Noir, 2099, and Ultimate versions of Spider-Man joining forces to acquire fragments of the Tablet of Order and Chaos after the 616 Spider-Man accidentally shattered it while fighting Mysterio, who also seeks the fragments after one of them grants him mystical powers. Over the course of the game, the four Spider-Men face various enemies enhanced by the tablet fragments' power, culminating in them confronting Mysterio as he uses the restored tablet's power to become a virtual god.
- Spider-Man: Edge of Time features a time travel plot involving the Earth-616 Spider-Man and Spider-Man 2099 working together simultaneously in the present and future to stop Alchemax scientist Walker Sloan from changing history. Along the way, they discover that Sloan is backed by an evil future version of Peter Parker, who became the CEO of Alchemax and intends to use Sloan's time portal to retroactively alter his past and undo his mistakes, regardless of the possibility of destroying the time-space continuum.
- A mobile game promoting the release of "Spider-Verse" called Spider-Man Unlimited was released on September 11, 2014, with a loose interpretation of the story. After the Earth-616 Spider-Man defeats a figure known as the "Gold Goblin", Nick Fury tells him that the Green Goblin assembled a multiversal Sinister Six via a portal and plans to take over their dimension. However, S.H.I.E.L.D. found a way to use the portal to bring in alternative versions of Spider-Man to aid him in the battle. For a number of events, both Morlun and Karn of the Inheritors have made appearances as bosses. In February 2015, the "Spider-Verse" storyline introduced new characters from the Spider-Army as well as the first appearances of Daemos and Jennix as bosses. In the closing moments of the event, Solus would make an appearance as a boss well. The game was recalled on March 31, 2019.
- The plot of "Spider-Verse" was adapted for the 27th Spec-Ops Mission of Marvel: Avengers Alliance. Originally announced as "Spider-Verse Part 1", the 27th Spec-Ops was released as "Along Came the Spiders". Karn became the first Inheritor featured in the game as a group boss. The 29th Spec-Ops, titled "Aranea Ex Machina", continued the game's adaptation of the "Spider-Verse" storyline, featuring Silk as the award hero and Morlun as the second Inheritor to be featured as a boss.
- Silk, Spider-Gwen, and Miles Morales were made playable characters in Marvel: Future Fight as part of a promotional tie-in to "Spider-Verse".
- Peter Parker, Miles Morales, and Spider-Gwen appear as playable characters in Marvel Ultimate Alliance 3: The Black Order. Additionally, the game adds Natasha Romanoff / Black Widow and Eddie Brock / Venom as additional members for a Web Warriors team bonus.

== In popular culture ==
The term "Spider-Verse" has found its way into popular media as a term to describe a group of Spider-Men or different variations of Spider-Man. Such is also a case for different Spider-Man related merchandise.
