= Spider-Bitch (Ashley Barton) =

Marvel Comics supervillain

Ashley Barton Spider-Bitch
- Ashley Barton as Spider-Bitch by Steve McNiven, Dexter Vines, and Morry Hollowell.

Publication information
- Publisher: Marvel Comics
- First appearance: As Ashley: Wolverine #67 (September 2008); As Spider-Bitch: Wolverine #68 (October 2008)
- Created by: Mark Millar (writer); Steve McNiven (artist)

In-story information
- Alter ego: Ashley Parker Barton
- Species: Human
- Place of origin: The Wastelands, Earth-807128/21923
- Team affiliations: Spider-Army/Amazing Arachnids/Spider-Force
- Partnerships: Clint Barton / Hawkeye (father); Tonya Parker (mother); Ultron 8 (Eight) (stepfather); Otto Octavius / Superior Spider-Man (boss)
- Notable aliases: Spider-Bitch; Spider-Woman; Spider-Girl; Spider-Lady; Spider-Kingpin; Kingpin of the Wastelands; Kingpin of Crime; Lady Barton; Ash Barton-Morse; King Zemo
- Abilities: Peak human strength, speed, and agility; Use of interdimensional travel

Spider-Bitch (Ashley Parker Barton) is a character appearing in American comic books published by Marvel Comics. Created by Mark Millar and Steve McNiven, the character first appeared in Wolverine #67 (September 2008). She is the estranged daughter of Peter Parker / Spider-Man's youngest daughter Tonya and Clint Barton / Hawkeye, and the stepdaughter of Tonya's husband Ultron 8, from the alternate-future of Earth-807128/21923, in which the supervillains overthrew the superheroes three decades earlier. Having no superpowers after being saved from execution by her estranged father and Old Man Logan in 2008's Old Man Logan storyline, Spider-Bitch kills the current Kingpin of Crime, succeeding him as the Kingpin of the Wastelands, revealing her true villainous nature before unsuccessfully attempting to kill her father and Logan.

While usually portrayed as a supervillain, Spider-Bitch has also been occasionally depicted assisting her fellow Spider-People in multiversal conflicts. In the 2014–15 "Spider-Verse" storyline, set after Old Man Logan, Spider-Bitch is among the first recruited to a resistance movement against the Inheritors' consumption of Spider-People across the Spider-Verse by the Superior Spider-Man, Otto Octavius, to devise a plan to kill them all; in the aftermath of the conflict, Spider-Bitch continues to explore the multiverse, assisting various teams of Spider-People while funnelling resources back to her home dimension until the 2018 Spider-Geddon storyline and Spider-Force miniseries, following which she returns to her reality, seven years having passed, and reclaims her throne from Taskmaster in 2019's Old Man Quill storyline, continuing her plans to take over the world.

Receiving a generally positive critical reception, the character was adapted to the 2021 radio drama podcast series Marvel's Wastelanders as Ash Morse / King Zemo, voiced by Sasha Lane, and made her cinematic debut in the 2023 feature film Spider-Man: Across the Spider-Verse, referred to as Ashley / Spider-Kingpin, a member of Miguel O'Hara's Spider-Society.

== Publication history ==
Created by Mark Millar and Steve McNiven, Spider-Bitch first appeared in Wolverine Vol. 3 #67 (September 2008) before making full appearances the following two issues in October and November. Owing to the child-oriented storylines of the character's initial appearances post-Old Man Logan, she is alternately referred to as "Spider-Woman" or "Spider-Girl" due to censorship in text box descriptions, referring to herself as "the Spider-B****" in dialogue.

She is a supporting character in the event series Spider-Verse (Nov. 2014–Feb. 2015), Spider-Geddon (Oct.–Dec. 2018), and Old Man Quill (Feb.–Dec. 2019), and a minor character in Old Man Hawkeye (Feb.–Dec. 2018).

== Fictional character biography ==
=== Old Man Logan ===
Wolverine Vol. 3 #67 (September 2008), depicting Spider-Bitch's first appearance. Art by Steve McNiven.

In the future of Old Man Logan, thirty years after the supervillains overthrew the superheroes, the title character and the now-blind Clint Barton / Hawkeye are passing through Hammer Falls, Nevada after Clint hired Logan as protection while delivering a shipment cross-country, when the pair are greeted by Ultron Eight, the current husband of Clint's third ex-wife Tonya (the youngest daughter of Peter Parker / Spider-Man) and stepfather to their 22-year-old daughter Ashley, both of whom Clint had left when she was three months old with limited contact since. Assuming Clint is there because of a letter Tonya had sent him, Ultron is surprised to learn that he hasn't received it and directs him to Tonya, who informs Clint that Ashley and her friends, apparently inspired by stories of Clint and her grandfather, had formed a super-team and gone north to Salt Lake City, Utah to take down an unnamed African-American man who is the current Kingpin of Crime before being captured and set to be publicly executed the following morning; Ashley is shown to be in a prison cell to be dressed in a costume similar to that of the deceased Spider-Women and her aunt Mayday Parker / Spider-Girl. Surprised, having "never really had Ashley pegged as the superhero type", telling Tonya that he had gotten the impression that she was an "evil badass type [who] never really seemed especially altruistic" from the few encounters he had had with her, Clint nonetheless agrees to rescue her and doubles Logan's salary to convince him to help him rescue her. While en route, passing through Cedar City, Clint tells Logan that while surprised, he is "so friggin' proud" of his daughter; meanwhile, in the Rice–Eccles Stadium in Salt Lake City (now Fisk Lake City), the Kingpin feeds the other members of Ashley's team, successors to Daredevil and the Punisher, to utahraptors while bragging over having killed Magneto during his rise to power, as the pair beg to know what they had done to Ashley. Elsewhere, in her cell inside a customized Walmart-turned-prison, Ashley, known as "Spider-Bitch", sits silently as some of her guards mock the concept of superheroes, before Clint and Logan crash their Spider-Mobile through the wall of the prison. Stating "That'll be Dad." upon hearing the crash, Ashley watches as her father massacre the guards before telling him precisely where on the wall the control panel for her cell is so he can open it, shooting it with an arrow. As the Kingpin enters the room to see what the commotion is, the newly freed Ashley immediately decapitates him by swinging the end of a shotgun into his neck, before knocking a surprised Clint to the ground: Ashley explains that she and her team came to the area not as superheroes, but as supervillains, intending to seize control of the Kingpin's Quarter (formerly Las Vegas) by killing him, the same way the Kingpin himself had taken over as dictator by killing Magneto. As she prepares to beat her father to death, Ashley tells him that she's "doing it because I want to", before Logan, having witnessed Ashley's actions, crashes through the skylight in the Spider-Mobile and rescues Clint. Overlooking the escaping duo, Ashley orders a segment of her new army to go after them, before taking her rightful place on her throne as Spider-Bitch, the Kingpin of the Wastelands. While drinking at a bar with the following day, Clint regrets not being involved in his daughter's life, recalling the day she was born and how she was the first thing she ever saw; these events are also witnessed by a time-displaced Eva Bell.

=== Edge of Spider-Verse and Spider-Verse ===
Alternately referred to as both "Spider-Woman" and "Spider-Girl" due to censorship in text box descriptions (although referring to herself as "the Spider-B****" in dialogue), and indicated to now be going by her father's surname as Ashley Barton, Spider-Bitch returns in Spider-Verse as one of the first recruited to the Spider-Army of Otto Octavius, the Superior Spider-Man, after he saves her from being consumed by Karn, joining him in recruiting other Spider-People from across the multiverse to their cause, meeting various variants of her grandfather and his family, amongst others. After subduing and capturing Karn, Spider-Bitch is among those who push to immediately kill him, only for him to reveal he is but one of a family of Inheritors driven to consume Spider-Totems and escapes his bonds, preparing to consume two of their number before two of his siblings turn up to do so instead; the trio ultimately begin fighting one another, allowing the Spider-Army to escape to their base in 2099. After sending the rest of the Spider-Army to research Karn and his siblings, Otto takes Spider-Bitch and Black-Ops Spider-Man aside to discuss their shared perspective as "killers" who have seen "Brutality. Devastation. Darkness." and whether they are willing to "the face of true evil" and potentially commit genocide against the Inheritors. After a pause, the trio agree, with Spider-Bitch, acknowledging Otto as "boss", stating that "If we're going to survive this, we'll do whatever we have to. Whether the others like it or not." Over the next few months, after fending off several more Inheritor attacks, killing several of them, and learning Karn can be turned to their cause, being an unwilling Inheritor who took no joy in his overpowering biological urges to consume Spider-Totems, banished from returning home for eons, Spider-Bitch agrees with a segment of the Spider-Army to lend Karn some off their life-force before successfully recruiting him to fight and imprison his family.

=== Deadpool: Too Soon? ===
In the Infinite Comic Deadpool: Too Soon?, while investigating an assassin who has been killing several "silly" superheroes across the multiverse, Deadpool seeks to protect Spider-Ham, tracking him down to Central Park, where he interrupts an ongoing baseball game between the Amazing Arachnids (a team of Spider-People from across the Spider-Verse) and the Seething Snikters (a team of variants of Wolverine, his clones and his children). Noticing Deadpool, a participating Spider-Bitch questions what he is doing there and why he interrupted the game, before joining the other Spider-People and Wolverines in chasing him out of the park.

=== Old Man Hawkeye ===
In the prequel series Old Man Hawkeye (Jan.–Dec. 2018), set five years before Old Man Logan, after learning that his glaucoma will render him completely blind in a matter of weeks due to, Clint visits a 17-year-old Ashley in Hammer Falls, Nevada so that he can see her with his own eyes for the last time; after Clint notes she has a poster of a young him as Hawkeye on the wall (alongside posters of her grandfather Spider-Man and the Kingpin), Ashley references him atypically showing up every five years to see her. Hearing from Tonya that Ashley had recently gotten in trouble for fighting, Clint is initially proud to hear that she had beaten up a bully who had in turn been "beating up one of the fat kids" and stealing his money, only to learn that she had beaten them both up due the "fat kid" having been paying her for protection, and she was insulted by the "disrespect" he had shown by keeping money from her. Dismissing her father's attempts at small talk, Ashley asks Clint why he is really there. After she is dismissive of his vague response, Clint leaves Ashley be, leaving to fulfil his vendetta with the Thunderbolts before he is fully blind. A few days later, Marshal Bullseye, tracking Clint's subsequent killings, visits Hammer Falls and questions Ashley about Clint (whom he rightfully suspects to be behind the killings) outside her mother's garage. After learning that Clint does not actually live there, only coming around "once every few years when he feels guilty about knocking up my mother", Marshal Bullseye notices Ashley's lack of fear with regards to his appearance, even after pulling out a sai in front of her; Ashley references having killed the last man to stick a knife in her face. Impressed, and receiving word of a new "attack by assailant wielding bow", Marshal Bullseye tells Ashley ("little lady") that he will give Clint her regards when he sees him. Later, while visiting Arcade's Murderworld, Nevada to kill Atlas, Clint briefly meets with an elderly Ruth "Blindfold" Aldine, who sees the "bloody road" he is on, "choosing to live for revenge", in particular Ashley's future as Spider-Bitch five years in the future, her attempt to kill him, and his own death days after, although only vaguely alluding to it and shaping images of her, Clint and Logan out of smoke.

=== Spider-Geddon and Spider-Force ===
In the 2018 comics event Spider-Geddon and the spin-off mini-series Spider-Force, Spider-Bitch recruits Spider-Kid, a 13-year-old Petey Parker, whom she nicknames "Gramps", to his great annoyance, to gain his assistance in preventing Otto (now the Superior Octopus) from unwittingly and unknowingly allowing the Inheritors to clone themselves new bodies, following their earlier escape from their radioactive prison planet, allowing them to launch their attack on the Spider-Verse anew. After failing to stop Otto, who is horrified by what he has done and returns to the mantle of the Superior Spider-Man while attempting to redeem himself; Spider-Bitch, Jessica Drew, Kaine Parker, Astro-Spider, and Spider-Kid meanwhile form a "Spider-Force" to travel to the Inheritors' former prison on an intended suicide mission (wearing hazmat suits) to destroy the abandoned crystal containing the soul of the Inheritors' father Solus, the most powerful Inheritor of them all to prevent his resurrection as well, coming into conflict with that universe's John Jameson. Jameson, revealed to be a telepath, reads the Spider-Force's mind to be able to trust them: while doing so, a glimpse of Ashley Barton's childhood is seen: killing enforcers of the original Kingpin with a dirtbike and stealing cartons of milk for her community. After proceeding to a space station orbiting the planet, Ashley shares a moment of vulnerability with Petey after being briefly "touched" by the Inheritor Verna: Ashley recalls sitting on her reality's Peter's knee as a baby shortly before his death, before growing up in a wasteland of lies, abandonment and abuse. After almost being killed by Verna, the duo escape in an escape pod before unwittingly unknowingly themselves delivering the Solus crystal to the Inheritors via Jessica. After Solus is resurrected, Gwen Stacy / Spider-Gwen leads the new Spider-Army, including a returned Ashley as Spider-Bitch against the Inheritors, alongside a Captain Universe-enpowered Miles Morales, and with the Inheritors weakened thanks to a plan by Otto and Ben Reilly, the Spider-Army is able to achieve victory, binding the Inheritors (but for Morlun) in place before transferring their consciousnesses into the cloned bodies of babies and removing their hunger for Spider-Totems, truly recycling their souls. The Spider-Verse finally at peace, Spider-Bitch returns to her reality to resume her role as Kingpin of the Wastelands, contemplating her purpose in the world.

=== Old Man Quill ===
In Old Man Quill, after returning to the Wastelands to find seven years to have passed (since Old Man Logan), and Emperor Doom to have taken over her lands while she was fighting the Inheritors and travelling the multiverse, Spider-Bitch is captured by his forces and made to regularly fight in gladiatorial combat in Rice–Eccles Stadium over the following months, with Doom appointing Taskmaster in her stead. After coming across a stranded elderly Peter Quill alongside her in the arena (who is hallucinating the deceased Guardians of the Galaxy talking to him and Rocket Raccoon flirting with her), Spider-Bitch is surprised to learn she will not be facing her usual opponents in combat, but a mind-controlled Fin Fang Foom. After witnessing Spider-Bitch push a prisoner dressed like Captain America into a guard to steal the latter's spear, killing them both, before proceeding to attack Foom's ankles, Quill has Spider-Bitch give him a "Fastball Special", throwing him into one of the drones surrounding the arena to commandeer it, and use it to free Foom, who begins to incinerate the watching audience. Making her way to Taskmaster, Spider-Bitch mocks his age and competence before punching him multiple times in the face. After directing Quill on where to find the Ultimate Nullifier, a relic in the Baxter Building's ruins in New York which he is looking for, Spider-Bitch resumes her role as Kingpin of the Wastelands, overseeing the gladiatorial fights as her assistant arranges for her to watch Taskmaster take on her newly captured Venom-infused Tyrannosaurus rex. Sometime later, after her men discover an army of Doombots to be coming in her direction, Spider-Bitch prepares a speech for her people to inspire them to fight and die on her behalf to protect "what's mine". After one of her assistants informs that they will surely all be killed the moment the Doombots arrive in the city based on the speed they are moving at, Spider-Bitch asks him to "show a little spine"; after seeing the Doombots blow past above the city, Spider-Bitch is surprised that she was not their intended target. Later still, while sitting on her throne and holding a skull in her hands, Spider-Bitch is insulted when her television channels are replaced by a broadcast from Doom and Madame Masque of Quill's intended execution, which is interrupted by Galactus, who Quill then kills.

=== Spider-Verse vs. Venomverse ===
In Spider-Verse vs. Venomverse, Spider-Bitch returns to the multiverse to gleefully assist the Spider-Society in warring with the symbiotes.

== Powers and abilities ==
Despite her get-up, and being considered a Spider-Totem by the Inheritors and the Web of Life and Destiny, Spider-Bitch seemingly has none of the powers of her grandfather, Spider-Man (super-strength, agility, the ability to stick to surfaces, and a spider-sense that warns them of danger), although she displays strength, speed, and agility which allow her to go toe-to-toe with superhumans. She acquired these skills through vigorous training and exercise. (Note: In November 2023, McGuire noted that he had been removed as the credited author of this article following rewrites and an added A.I. summary.) Expressing no interest in romantic relationships of any kind, Spider-Bitch instead seeks world domination and independence from oversight by Doctor Doom throughout Old Man Quill, oblivious to his lack of interest in her actions.

== Reception ==
=== Accolades ===
- In 2017, Gizmodo ranked Ashley Barton 17th in their "Greatest Spider-Women of All Time" list.
- In 2020, Comic Book Resources ranked Ashley Barton 8th in their "Spider-Woman: 10 Most Powerful Characters To Bear The Name" list.
- In 2021, IGN included Ashley Barton in their "10 Spider-Man Variants Who Should Appear in Spider-Man: Across the Spider-Verse" list.

== Other versions ==
=== Edge of Venomverse ===
Fifteen years after the events of Old Man Logan, Spider-Bitch (depicted as white due to a printing error) finally tracks down Logan (his escape the only "black mark on [her] reputation" as the Kingpin of the Wastelands) with the assistance of Bruce Banner Junior and Warren Worthington III, each respectively helping her after learning Logan to have been responsible for the deaths of their biological family and teammates respectively. After having Warren knock Logan out, Spider-Bitch strings him up with web shooters she acquired from her grandfather's corpse so the trio can taunt them, before releasing a Venom-infused Tyrannosaurus rex to eat him alive, keeping them at bay with web-whips. After Logan briefly tears himself free using his claws, Spider-Bitch webs them together again, only for Logan to take advantage of her lack of a Spider-Sense and use the momentum of her webs to pull her up into the air into the Tyrannosaurus's maw, killing her.

=== Deadpool Kills the Marvel Universe Again ===
In Deadpool Kills the Marvel Universe Again, as a brainwashed Deadpool decapitates Miles Morales while flying on Green Goblin's glider, dressed as Spider-Man, he sees himself as a "Composite Spider-Man and Deadpool" ending "The Saga of the Spider-Verse Clone Conspiracy" by killing multiple Spider-People, including Spider-Bitch, and "putting an end to this arachnid mayhem!"

== In other media ==
=== Film ===
Kris Anka's concept art of a redesigned Ashley Barton / Spider-Kingpin and Felicity Hardy / Scarlet Spider (wearing the Spider-Armor MK II) for Spider-Man: Across the Spider-Verse.

- Spider-Bitch, referred to as "Spider-Kingpin", appears in Spider-Man: Across the Spider-Verse (2023) as a member of Miguel O'Hara's Spider-Society.
- In November 2023, Dax ExclamationPoint expressed interest in portraying Spider-Bitch in a Sony's Spider-Man Universe (SSU) solo film adjacent to the Spider-Verse series.

=== Video games ===
- Spider-Bitch makes a cameo appearance in Spider-Man: Shattered Dimensions (2010).
- Spider-Bitch, referred to as "Spider-Girl", appears as an unlockable playable character in Spider-Man Unlimited.

=== Miscellaneous ===
- Ashley Barton appears in Marvel's Wastelanders: Hawkeye (2021), voiced by Sasha Lane. This version, also known as Ash Morse, Ash Barton, and Natasha Cassandra "Ash" Barton-Morse (née Bishop-Jones), is the 17-year-old, non-superpowered biological daughter of Kate Bishop and Jason Jones, who Bishop left in Clint Barton and Bobbi Morse's care following Jason's sudden death. While running for student government president in high school on a platform dedicated to criticizing the Kingdom of Zemo, in which she lives, her best friend and bodyguard Max suffers an overdose of a drug called "Hype" that grants its consumer superpowers and explodes, seemingly dying in the process. Swearing revenge, Ash learns the drugs came from the Brotherhood Traveling Circus, Carnival and Ringmaster's Road Show and recruits Clint, who is employed with them, to help her find the drugs' distributor and kill them. Along the way, Ash reunites with Kate and attempts to kill Max's supplier, Frederick Dukes, Junior, only to learn he had been manipulated by the Ringmaster and Max is alive, having teleported to safety following the explosion and hidden himself in the woods neighboring the circus. Upon reuniting with Max, Ash begins to question her desire for revenge and the path it will bring her down in life. Sometime later, Ash becomes the new King Zemo, one of the Seven Dictators of the Wastelands, when her predecessor, Herman Zemo, vacates the position after spending a decade of impersonating his father Helmut.
- Spider-Bitch is referenced in Doja Cat's song "HEADHIGH" via her 2024 album Scarlet.

=== Merchandise ===
Ashley Barton / Spider-Bitch received a figure in Hasbro's Marvel Legends line.
