= Spider-Punk =

Marvel Comics character

Hobie Brown Spider-Punk
- Portion of the cover of Spider Punk #1 (April 2022). Art by Olivier Coipel.

Publication information
- Publisher: Marvel Comics
- First appearance: The Amazing Spider-Man #10 (January 2015)
- Created by: Dan Slott (writer); Olivier Coipel (artist)

In-story information
- Alter ego: Hobart Larry Brown
- Species: Human mutate
- Place of origin: Earth-138
- Team affiliations: Spider-Army/Web-Warriors
- Notable aliases: Spider-Man
- Abilities: Superhuman strength, speed, reflexes, agility, coordination and balance, ability to cling to solid surfaces; Accelerated healing; Genius level intellect; Proficient scientist and engineer; Precognitive spider-sense ability; Utilizing wrist-mounted web-shooters; Musician; Expert combatant

Spider-Punk (Hobie Brown) is a superhero appearing in American comic books published by Marvel Comics. He is an alternate version of Hobie Brown and Spider-Man. His antagonists include President Norman Osborn, Venom, and the Inheritors.

Hobie Brown / Spider-Punk made his film debut in Spider-Man: Across the Spider-Verse, voiced by Daniel Kaluuya, and is set to return in Spider-Man: Beyond the Spider-Verse.

== Publication history ==
Spider-Punk was created by writer Dan Slott and artist Olivier Coipel. The idea of a punk Spider-Man emerged when Coipel proposed the look for Spider-UK. Slott rejected the look as wrong for a member of the Captain Britain Corps, but used it to develop a new character that would be "all punk".

Spider-Punk first appeared in The Amazing Spider-Man #10 (January 2015), during the "Spider-Verse" storyline. He again appeared during the "Spider-Geddon" storyline in 2018. In the stories, he interacts with Superior Spider-Man, Pavitr Prabhakar, Miles Morales, and Spider-Man Noir.

In 2022, Spider-Punk appeared in his first solo miniseries, written by Cody Ziglar. The story includes punk variants of many Marvel characters, as well as songs and imagery of punk rock and hardcore punk bands such as MC5, Ramones, Dead Kennedys, and Misfits.

== Fictional character biography ==
=== Spider-Verse (comics) ===
In the "Spider-Verse" storyline, the Earth-138 version of Spider-Man is revealed to be Hobart Brown, originally operating as Spider-Punk. He is a homeless teenager who was transformed by a spider that was irradiated by toxic waste dumped by President Norman Osborn. He becomes the punk rock-inspired Spider-Man, leading the downtrodden people of New York against Osborn's V.E.N.O.M. troops. Spider-Punk manages to kill Osborn during a riot by bashing him with his guitar. After Osborn's death, Spider-Punk publicly reveals his identity to the crowd present, who view him as their savior. Spider-Punk is later recruited by Superior Spider-Man to join an army of Spider-Men.

=== Spider-Geddon ===
During the "Spider-Geddon" storyline, Spider-Punk is shown to be fighting Thunderstrike while the other Web Warriors are dismantling Loomworld. Spider-Punk (who is starting to call himself Spider-Man) takes down Thunderstrike, who is killed by Kang the Conqueror shortly afterward. Spider-Punk escapes from Kang and asks for a tape from Captain Anarchy, who is busy fighting the Annihilation Wave. When Kang's Spider-Punk dolls catch up to Spider-Punk, they get into a fight with the Annihilation Wave, with one of them eating Captain Anarchy's tape. As Captain Anarchy holds Kang off, Spider-Punk swings away.

After Kang disappears, Spider-Girl shows up and states that something big is coming, and Spider-Punk agrees to go with her. Spider-Punk later visits an unnamed reality and saves the Norman Osborn version of Spider-Man from the collapsing Oscorp Tower. In a flashback to seven months prior, Spider-Punk assists Spider-Girl, Pavitr Prabhakar, Spider-UK, and Karn, who have been keeping surveillance on the Inheritors.

Spider-Punk is among the spider-powered characters who recruit Miles Morales to confront Superior Octopus after learning that his cloning machine was made from the Inheritors' technology. They try to warn Superior Octopus, but it is too late as the Inheritors start to emerge, killing Spider-Man Noir and Spider-UK. After the Inheritors emerge, Spider-Punk and Superior Octopus come up with a plan to kill the Inheritors.

=== Spider-Punk: Banned in D.C. ===
Spider-Punk's first solo mini-series, written by Cody Ziglar and drawn by Justin Mason, fleshes out Earth-138. After defeating Kraven and the Hunters, Spider-Punk and Captain Anarchy head back to their base to reconvene with Riri Williams/Riotheart to show her a weapon they pulled off of Kraven's group and determine where it came from. However, they are later attacked by Taskmaster.

== In other media ==
=== Television ===
Spider-Punk makes a cameo appearance in the Ultimate Spider-Man episode "Return to the Spider-Verse: Part 4", voiced by Drake Bell.

=== Film ===
Hobie Brown as he appears in Across the Spider-Verse.

- Hobie Brown / Spider-Punk appears in Spider-Man: Across the Spider-Verse, voiced by Daniel Kaluuya. This version is a Briton who, like Kaluuya, comes from Camden Town. He was written as a Briton to differentiate him from Miles Morales. Polygon noted a positive general consensus around him, saying he is one of the characters in the film "that's been blowing everyone's minds with just how wild he looks". Spider-Punk has been described as the "most entertaining Spider-Man variant we meet" in the film, as well as "one of the coolest". Ayan Artan of Digital Spy (DS) saw the introduction of Spider-Punk into Miles Morales's story as positive Black British representation: "His character design is jagged around the edges and consistently shifting, while his personality swings between that classic Cockney sensibility and immeasurable Black-British street swagger. He's simply the coolest Spider-Man in Across the Spider-Verse and perhaps even more refreshingly, he knows it, revels in it". Hobie was included in Across to make Miles insecure about his own abilities and "feel like a dork". Additionally, he was added to make Miles feel insecure about his own bond shown with Gwen Stacy, as the two are shown to have a close friendship. This incites jealousy from Miles who interprets her as being "starry eyed" for Hobie. Kaluuya has referred to the relationship between Gwen and Hobie in somewhat ambiguous terms, speculating that "something was happening", that they have a "genuine friendship" and that the depth of this relationship is "between Gwen and Hobie". He has also stated that Hobie "just has her back" and "like Miles, she follows her gut and has real feelings and is a person of herself". Co-writer and producer Chris Miller has referred to Gwen and Hobie as "best buddies" who "have a rapport".
- Hobie Brown / Spider-Punk will appear in Spider-Man: Beyond the Spider-Verse (2027), voiced again by Daniel Kaluuya. In April 2026, Sony released several frames from the film, including one with Hobie reaffirming his support in helping Miles save his father. Additionally, narration from Hobie was revealed at Cinemacon 2026, as he questions Miles about “saving his dad, beating Spot, shaking Miguel’s whole gang by himself”.
- Hobie Brown / Spider-Punk will headline a spin-off film with Daniel Kaluuya reprising the role and co-writing the screenplay with Ajon Singh.

=== Video games ===
- Spider-Punk appears as an unlockable playable character in Spider-Man Unlimited.
- Spider-Punk's suit appears as an alternate skin for the titular character of Marvel's Spider-Man and Marvel's Spider-Man 2.
- Spider-Punk appears as an unlockable playable character in Marvel Strike Force. This version is a member of the Web Warriors.
- Spider-Punk, as he appears in Spider-Man: Across the Spider-Verse, appears as a purchasable skin in Fortnite Battle Royale.
- Spider-Punk appears in Marvel Snap.
