= Inheritors (comics) =

Marvel Comics supervillain group

- The Inheritors, on The Amazing Spider-Man vol. 3, #12 (March 2015). L-R: Karn, Morlun, Bora, Brix, Verna, Jennix and Daemos. Art by Olivier Coipel.

Publication information
- Publisher: Marvel Comics
- First appearance: Morlun: The Amazing Spider-Man vol. 2 #30 (June 2001); Family: The Superior Spider-Man #33 (November 2014); As Ancients: Spider-Man: The Darkest Hours (June 2006)
- Created by: Christos N. Gage; M. A. Sepulveda Jim Butcher (Ancients)

In-story information
- Type of organization: Psychic vampire
- Base(s): Loomworld (Earth-001)
- Leader(s): Solus
- Agent(s): See Members

The Inheritors are a supervillain group which appears in American comic books published by Marvel Comics. The family of Morlun, they are a family of psychic vampires who are typically the enemies of Spider-Man and the iterations of him.

== Publication history ==
The Inheritors, who made their first appearance in The Superior Spider-Man #33 as part of the "Spider-Verse" storyline, were created by Christos Gage and M. A. Sepulveda, based on the Ancients, an earlier version of Morlun's family introduced in the 2006 novel Spider-Man: The Darkest Hours, written by Jim Butcher. "Spider-Geddon" again depicts the Inheritors; Gage said, "They're terrific villains – they literally eat spider-people! They're like vampires who feed on their life forces. And now that they're back, they have a score to settle. They're trying to recapture their former power and glory, and God help anyone who gets in the way."

== Fictional history ==
The Inheritors are a clan of totem hunters from Earth-001 who feed from animal, human and deity totems. They capture spider deity Master Weaver on Earth-000 at the cost of the life of their matriarch because Karn hesitated to strike. Patriarch Solus orders Karn to wear a mask and exiles him until he can earn his way back. They use the Master Weaver's power to conquer Earth-001, traveling between dimensions and hunting Spider-Totem avatars because those were prophesied to overthrow them.

=== Spider-Verse ===
Superior Spider-Man (Doctor Octopus's mind in Spider-Man's body) finds Karn as his new team (Spider-Man Noir, Six Arm Spider-Man, Spider-Monkey, Ashley Barton, and Assassin Spider-Man) ambushes him on the Cyborg Spider-Man's Earth-2818. Karn is unaffected by their weapons, and they escape when Karn's siblings Brix and Bora arrive. Karn goes into another universe to kill Ai Apaec.

Verna takes the Hounds out to hunt, and Morlun is furious that Daemos was hunting on Earth-616. Solus reminds them that he knows where the Bride, the Other, and the Scion are, and about a prophecy which will doom the Inheritors. Morlun says that he wants to be his father's chosen heir; the Great Web is his legacy and obligation. Solus says that the Web is all things and everywhere, and their kingdom makes them inheritors of all creation.

Spider-Man arrives on Earth-928 and finds Superior Spider-Man in charge. Old Man Spider-Man tells him about the prophecy targeting the Bride, the Other, and the Scion. When Daemos arrives and kills Spider-Cyborg, Superior Spider-Man kills Daemos but he regenerates. As the Spider-Men escape to Earth-13, Spider-Man is told by the dying Old Man Spider-Man to protect the totems.

Six-Arm Spider-Man, Spider-Man 2099, and Lady Spider of Earth-803 travel to 2099 to dissect the clone body of Daemos for clues about how to defeat his brethren. Followed to the future by a new Daemos, Six Arm Spider-Man creates a distraction, but is killed before Miguel traps Daemos. Daemos kills himself so another clone can be activated. Miguel enlists the help of the Earth-928 Punisher to hold him off until Spider-Man 2099 and Lady Spider can transport back to Earth-13.

Karn comes to Earth-3123 to kill the spider-totem of the reality where Aunt May was bitten by a radioactive spider and became Spider-Ma'am. She surrenders herself to keep her husband and nephew from harm. Karn is turned by Spider-Girl, Spider-UK, Spider-Punk, Spider-Man: India, and Spider-Woman of Earth-807128 against the Inheritors.

After Black Widow of Earth-1610 and Kaine destroy the cloning facility on Earth-802, the Inheritors attack; Kaine arrives on Earth-001 and impales Solus. The Spider-Men then overpower the Inheritors with Karn's help. After the Master Weaver is killed, Karn takes his place. It is revealed that the Master Weaver was an alternate version of Karn, forming a temporal paradox.

=== Spider-Geddon ===
Jennix, Morlun, and Verna emerge from Superior Octopus' cloning machine and Spider-Man Noir and Spider-UK are their first victims. Jennix tells Morlun that his score with the Earth-616 version of Spider-Man is irrelevant.

As Jennix works to regenerate the rest of the Inheritors, the spiders suggest that Superior Octopus trigger the base's self-destruction while Spider-Gwen with her symbiote distracts them. The Inheritors are free, restricted to their current bodies. Verna searches for the crystal containing Solus' life-force. She takes Brix, Bora, and Daemos with her while Jennix rebuilds the cloning tubes. Superior Octopus and Spider-Punk suggest killing the Inheritors. Karn is confronted by Verna for siding with the Web Warriors. After he stabs her, she still feeds on his lifeforce.

Spider-Woman retrieves to Earth-616 with the crystal containing Solus' life force, which is stolen and used to resurrect Solus. Superior Spider-Man knocks out Ben Reilly and gives him to them as part of a deal which includes Solus sparing Earth-616. As Superior Spider-Man leaves, the Inheritors close in on Ben. However, Solus is shot in the back by Miles Morales, who was transformed into Captain Universe by the Enigma Force. As Superior Spider-Man and Octavia Otto revive Ben Reilly, the other spider-powered groups fight the Inheritors. Spider-Man allows Superior Spider-Man to formulate a plan as the Captain Universe-powered Miles uses Leopardon's sword on Solus, Brix, Bora, and Daemos. Superior Spider-Man tells the others that he revived the Inheritors as babies because Spider-Man arranged for the same thing to be done to Morlun. Spider-Ma'am states that her family will foster the baby Inheritors.

=== End of the Spider-Verse ===
After the totemic wasp-goddess Shathra was freed once more, she corrupts Spider-Ma'am and kills all the baby Inheritors, leaving Morlun the only Inheritor alive. Forced to work alongside the remaining Spider-Totems to stop Shathra, Morlun uses the Totem Dagger against Shathra, intending to sever her from the Great Web. However, the blade only works on Spider-Totems, meaning it has no effect on her. As Shathra beats Morlun, she reveals the true origins of the Inheritors, stating that they are far from the all-powerful hunters they pretend to be. The Inheritors are Totems themselves, imbued with the power to drain the life force of others and representing the leech. They saw an opportunity to target the Spider-Totems to steal their power and their connection to the Web of Life.

== Members ==
- Solus – The patriarch of the Inheritors.
- Unnamed Matriarch – Solus' wife who died during the mission to capture the Master Weaver.
- Daemos – Solus' eldest son who is shown to have a jealous personality when two of his siblings have been declared the favorite of both his parents.
- Morlun – Solus' favorite who caused the temporary death of Spider-Man.
- Bora and Brix – Twins who compete with each other.
- Jennix – The brains of the family whose experiments are on Earth-802. He considers himself the more civilized of his family.
- Verna – Owner of the Hounds.
- Karn – The outcast and youngest son who was his mother's favorite. He abandons the family, becomes the Master Weaver, and is later killed by Verna.

== In other media ==
=== Video games ===
- The Inheritors appear in Spider-Man Unlimited with Morlun voiced by Travis Willingham, Solus voiced by Kyle Hebert, Daemos and Jennix voiced by Neil Kaplan, and Karn voiced by Matthew Mercer.
- Karn and Morlun appear as bosses in Marvel: Avengers Alliance.

=== Novels ===
A non-canon predecessor of the Inheritors called the Ancients appears in the novel Spider-Man: The Darkest Hours, consisting of Thanis, Mortia, and Malos.

== Reception ==
In June 2018, Comic Book Resources ranked the Inheritors its fourteenth choice of supervillains for a subsequent Marvel Cinematic Universe.
