= List of incarnations of Spider-Man =

Spider-Man / Scarlet Spider / Spider-Woman / Spider-Girl / Silk
- Depiction of some of the mainstream characters (along with alternate versions) as shown in Spider-Geddon.
- Publisher: Marvel Comics
- First appearance: Amazing Fantasy #15 (August 1962)
- Created by: Stan Lee; Steve Ditko
- Characters: Peter Parker; Ben Reilly; Otto Octavius; Yu Komori; Kaine Parker; Pavitr Prabhakar; William "Billy" Braddock; Miles Morales; Kurt Wagner
- See also: Alternative versions of Spider-Man

This is a list of superheroes in the Marvel Universe who have used the name "Spider-Man" or share the characteristics of Spider-Man. The original and best known Spider-Man character, who has the secret identity Peter Parker, was created by Stan Lee and Steve Ditko. Other characters have adopted the alias of "Spider-Man" over the years in the Earth-616 universe such as Ben Reilly and Otto Octavius. There are also alternate universe versions of Spider-Man such as May "Mayday" Parker and Miguel O'Hara.

== Characters named Spider-Man ==
=== Peter Parker ===
Peter Parker, the Amazing Spider-Man, is the mainstream and original Earth-616 incarnation of the character and appears in almost every piece of Spider-Man related media. All other "spider-men" are derived from him.

=== Ben Reilly ===
Ben Reilly is a clone of Peter Parker, who also briefly fought crime as the Scarlet Spider. He also took over as Spider-Man (with a new costume) when Peter retired to settle down with a new family. This lasted until the original Green Goblin returned and murdered him. Long after his death, Reilly was resurrected by the Jackal.

Later on Ben joined a company known as Beyond Corporation and worked under them, during this time Ben reunited with his old girlfriend Janine Godby. After learning he lost pieces of his mind, Ben ran away from Beyond. He later fought with Peter hoping to get his memories back and fell into a quantum shifting polymer as the building exploded. Janine found him and Ben picked up a new alias known as Chasm.

=== Spider-X ===
Spider-X

Publication information
- Publisher: Marvel Comics
- First appearance: Midnight Sons Unlimited #3 (Oct. 1993)
- Created by: Mort Todd

In-story information
- Alter ego: Brian Kornfield
- Notable aliases: Spider-Man to the Xth Power
- Abilities: Superhuman strength, speed, agility and durability; Black magic; Unlimited adhesive "webbing"; Accelerated healing factor; Bursts of destructive energy from his mouth; Wall-crawling

Spider-X (Brian Kornfield), created by Mort Todd, first appeared in Midnight Sons Unlimited #3 (Oct. 1993). Kornfield grew up off Broadway in New York City raised by his mother, with his father having been killed at an unknown time period. He had a very active imagination and idolized all superheroes, even writing letters to as many as he could. After his mother is brutally assaulted and mugged, Kornfield becomes obsessed with being a superhero so he could find and take down the muggers. Kornfield was met by the Dwarf, who offered him the power to be like his idol Spider-Man via the Darkhold. Kornfield accepted the offer and was transformed into Spider-X. Kornfield views himself as the ultimate arbitrator of justice, willing to mete out punishment that no one else would.

==== In other media ====
Spider-X appears as a playable character in Spider-Man Unlimited.

=== Mac Gargan ===
While possessing the Venom symbiote, Mac Gargan posed as Spider-Man as a member of the Dark Avengers until his capture at the end of the "Siege" storyline.

=== Mattie Franklin ===
The niece of J. Jonah Jameson. After being granted spider-powers by "The Gathering of Five", she filled in for Peter Parker during one of his temporary retirements and later became Spider-Woman when he reclaimed the role. She was killed by the Kravinoff family during "The Gauntlet" and "Grim Hunt" storylines.

=== Anansi ===
A member of the Vodu pantheon, he was the very first Spider-Man, according to Ezekiel Sims and the Ashanti tribe in Ghana.

=== Ai Apaec ===
Ai Apaec

Publication information
- Publisher: Marvel Comics
- First appearance: Osborn #1 (2011)
- Created by: Kelly Sue DeConnick; Jamie McKelvie

In-story information
- Species: God
- Team affiliations: Dark Avengers
- Notable aliases: Spider-Man, the Decapitator
- Abilities: Super-strength; Enhanced senses Underwater adaptations Long, sharp teeth that contain a powerful venom Wall-crawling

Ai Apaec is the Marvel Comics version of the chief deity of Moche culture, and a supervillain in the Marvel Universe.

Ai Apaec first appeared in the first issue of the 2011 Osborn miniseries, and was created by Kelly Sue DeConnick and Jamie McKelvie. Ai Apaec began appearing as a regular character in the Dark Avengers series, beginning with issue #175.

Ai Apaec is a chimeric being with the head, torso, and arms of a human, the lower half of a spider, snakes for hair, and large fangs. He was worshipped by the Moche people of Peru. He was eventually captured by government officials and held in a secret government base somewhere underwater. Ai Apaec ends up meeting Norman Osborn after Osborn is transferred to the base and joins him in escaping the base.

Ai Apaec has superhuman strength as well as venomous fangs, spider legs that enable him to cling to solid walls and surfaces, and the ability to generate a bell-shaped web that enables him to breathe underwater.

==== In other media ====
Ai Apaec appears as a playable character in Spider-Man Unlimited.

=== Otto Octavius ===
Otto Octavius swapped bodies with Peter Parker during the Dying Wish storyline, with Peter dying in his body. Possessing Peter's body and memories, Otto aims to become a superior replacement to him as the Superior Spider-Man, but is eventually forced to sacrifice himself to restore his host when he inadvertently allows the Goblin King to take control of New York City.

=== Miles Morales ===
Miles Morales, a half Puerto Rican and half Black teenager from the Ultimate Marvel universe (Earth-1610), has an origin almost identical to Peter Parker. In addition to Spider-Man's standard abilities, Miles is able to generate electricity and become invisible. After he and his family are transported to the mainstream 616 universe during Secret Wars, Miles continues fighting crime as Spider-Man.

=== Kurt Wagner ===
Nightcrawler (Kurt Wagner) was loaned a spare Spider-Man suit while on the run from Orchis. He later becomes the Uncanny Spider-Man ("Spinnenmann"/"Creepy Crawler") to atone for his actions under Orchis' control.

=== Norman Osborn ===
When Peter Parker was lost in space after being defeated by Hellgate, Norman Osborn would take on the mantle of Spider-Man, while Ben Reilly would take the place of Peter Parker. Norman would return the mantle to Peter after he returned from space.

== Other versions of Spider-Man ==
- Scarlet Spider is an alias of four characters who possess similar abilities to Spider-Man.
- Other clones of Peter Parker have also appeared, such as Kaine, his first clone, and Spidercide, his third clone.
- Blood Spider is an evil version of Spider-Man hired by the Red Skull and trained by the Taskmaster alongside Jagged Bow and Death-Shield (counterparts of Hawkeye and Captain America).
- The Doppelganger is a six-armed evil version of Spider-Man created by the Magus during the Infinity War.
- Ezekiel Sims has powers similar to those of Spider-Man, but mystical in origin. He is a member of the Spider Society and its front organization, WebCorps.
- The Tarantula: Several characters have used this identity; see the main article for details.
- The Steel Spider is Ollie Osnick, originally a teenager who idolized Doctor Octopus and designed his own mechanical tentacles. Later, he was so impressed by Spider-Man that he modified his tentacles into spider-legs.
- Web-Man is one of several evil clones of Spider-Man created by Doctor Doom in an Electric Company comic book. They were killed when Spider-Man destroys Doom's cloning machine.
- Several characters have used the Spider-Woman identity: Jessica Drew, Julia Carpenter (also called Arachne), Mattie Franklin, and Charlotte Witter. There is a version of Spider-Woman in the Ultimate Universe, a female clone of Peter Parker.
- Madame Web, a precognitive ally of Spider-Man and the Spider-Women.
- Anya Corazon, a young Latina Latino-American heroine with spider-powers, formerly an employee of WebCorps.
- Silk, a Korean-American girl who was bitten by the same radioactive spider as Peter Parker.
- Spider-Gwen is an alternate universe version of Gwen Stacy from Earth-65 who was bitten by the radioactive spider instead of Peter Parker, who became the Lizard.
- The Symbiotes, Venom and all of his descendants possess the powers of Spider-Man.

== Other examples ==
- The Timespinner is a robotic clone of Spider-Man created by Kang the Conqueror who can drain temporal energy. It is destroyed by Ben Reilly and the Avengers.
- Spider-Man villains such as the Chameleon, Mysterio, and Kraven the Hunter have all masqueraded as Spider-Man.
- Deadpool briefly masqueraded as Spider-Man.
- Several Skrulls have disguised themselves as Spider-Man, including Hulkling.

== Alternative versions ==
Outside of the mainstream Marvel Universe of Earth-616, there exists many versions of Spider-Man.
