= Blood Spider (character) =

Marvel Comics fictional supervillain

Publication information
- Publisher: Marvel Comics
- First appearance: The Amazing Spider-Man #367 (August 1992)
- Created by: David Michelinie; Mark Bagley; Jerry Bingham

In-story information
- Alter ego: Michael Bingham
- Species: Human

Blood Spider (Michael Bingham) is a supervillain appearing in media by Marvel Comics. He was created by David Michelinie, Mark Bagley, and Jerry Bingham. He was featured in The Amazing Spider-Man, Venom, and Daredevil comics. In addition, he was featured in Spider-Man: Hostile Takeover and the TV show Ultimate Spider-Man.

== Publication history ==
Blood Spider was created by David Michelinie, Mark Bagley, and Jerry Bingham, and first appeared in The Amazing Spider-Man #367 (October 1992).

== Fictional character biography ==
Michael Bingham and two other villains were trained by Taskmaster to imitate different superheroes, to kill Spider-Man; he was trained to imitate Spider-Man himself where he takes the name of Blood Spider. The two other villains were Death-Shield (imitating Captain America) and Jagged Bow (imitating Hawkeye).

In Venom: Lethal Protector, he is killed by Venom while fighting with Death-Shield.

Blood Spider later turned up alive. He, Death-Shield, and Jagged Bow are among the mercenaries hired by Lord Ogre to target Venom.

Crime Master hires Blood Spider, Death-Shield, and Jagged Bow to attack Deadpool and Slapstick when the Mercs for Money obtain a Rigellian Recorder. The villains are defeated by Deadpool and Slapstick.

Blood Spider, Death-Shield, and Jagged Bow take up a bounty on Daredevil. However, they are defeated by Daredevil, who is revealed to have created the bounty himself under an alias.

== Powers and abilities ==
Following his training at the hands of Taskmaster, Blood Spider possesses super-strength and quick reflexes.

=== Equipment ===
Blood Spider wields a copy of Spider-Man's web shooters that were attached to the tubing that connects to a special backpack.

== In other media ==
- An original incarnation of Blood Spider appears in Ultimate Spider-Man, voiced by Benjamin Diskin. This version is an alternate universe version of Peter Parker who originates from a universe where vampires took over most of Earth.
- The Michael Bingham incarnation of Blood Spider appears as a playable character in Spider-Man Unlimited.
- Blood Spider appears in the Spider-Man prequel novel Spider-Man: Hostile Takeover. This version was subjected to experiments by Norman Osborn, which exacerbate his preexisting mental health issues. Blood Spider comes to believe that he is the real Spider-Man and Peter Parker is an imposter.
