= Spider-UK =

- Billy Braddock as Spider-UK taken from the cover of Spider-Verse #5 (September 2015). Art by Andre Lima Araujo

Publication information
- Publisher: Marvel Comics
- First appearance: Edge of Spider-Verse #2 (September 2014)
- Created by: Jason Latour; Robbi Rodriguez

In-story information
- Alter ego: William "Billy" Braddock
- Species: Human mutate
- Team affiliations: Captain Britain Corps; Web Warriors
- Partnerships: Lady Spider
- Abilities: Superhuman strength, speed, agility, stamina, reflexes and durability Healing factor Precognitive Spider-Sense; Mechanical Web-Shooters; Use of inter dimensional travel device Ability to cling to most surfaces

Spider-UK of the Captain Britain Corps, or simply Spider-UK, is the name of several British alternate-reality superheroes appearing in American comic books published in Marvel Comics.

The first Spider-UK, Billy Braddock, a Spider-Man endling of the Captain Britain Corps from Earth-833, is introduced in the Spider-Verse event, becoming the leader of the Web Warriors before dying during Spider-Geddon. The second Spider-UK, Zarina Zahari, a Spider-Woman W.H.O. agent from Earth-834, recruited by Madame Web in the lead-up to the End of the Spider-Verse event, in which Billy also returns.

An original incarnation of Spider-UK named Malala Windsor appears in Spider-Man: Across the Spider-Verse, voiced by Sofia Barclay.

== Publication history ==
The Billy Braddock version of Spider-UK first appeared in Edge of Spider-Verse #2, as one of the lead characters in the "Spider-Verse" storyline and was created by Jason Latour and Robbi Rodriguez.

The Zarina Zahari version of Spider-UK first appeared in Edge of Spider-Verse Vol. 2 #1 and was created by Ramzee and Zoe Thorogood.

== Fictional character biography ==
=== Billy Braddock ===
Originating from Earth-833, William "Billy" Braddock is one of the newest recruits of the Captain Britain Corps who operates as Spider-UK. Scanning other universes during the "Spider-Verse" storyline, he has seen the deaths of alternate versions of Spider-Man by the Inheritors. Inheritor Jennix detects Billy watching them and immediately cuts the scanner feed. As Saturnyne and Lady Roma discuss their concerns about the Incursions that are destroying many dimensions, Spider-UK tries to explain about the killings of the Spiders across the multiverse. He gets rebuffed by Saturnyne, but a sympathetic Roma gives him a talisman that allows him to travel through the web of life in order to save the remaining Spiders.

Spider-UK was first seen having arrived in Earth-65, where he sees Spider-Woman as a possible recruit for the army of Spider-Men. Spider-UK later accompanies Spider-Woman, Spider-Girl, Spider-Man 2099, Spider-Girl of Earth-982, and Spider-Ham into meeting with Spider-Man and Silk. Spider-UK explains they are the Spiders of other dimensions and that all the strands of the Great Web are converging on Earth-616 Peter. Spider-UK tells him Morlun's elder brother Daemos is coming to Earth-616 and all of them head into a portal to another dimension. When on Earth-13, Spider-Man is told by Spider-UK and Earth-13's Spider-Man who never lost the Enigma Force that there is a war coming and that Spider-Man is the greatest Spider-Man of all. It is explained by Spider-UK and Spider-Man of Earth-13 that Spider-Man is the only Spider-Man who faced an Inheritor and won. Spider-UK gets a reading on the second team and Old Man Spider-Man of Earth-4 says they need to act quickly to recruit them.

When Morlun and his father Solus attack Earth-13, Spider-UK calls Spider-Man and tells him the Safe Zone is lost. Kwaku Anansi of Earth-7082 is a spider totem that is recruited by Spider-UK. Before he can join, Anansi needs to trick a demi-god Mister Mighty after stealing his sheep, then escape from Shungo the Storm God. On Earth-TRN521, Spider-UK recruits the Mexican Spider-Man named Arácnido. On Earth-3123, Karn is stopped from feeding on Spider-Ma'am by Spider-Girl, Spider-UK, Spider-Punk, Spider-Man of India, and Spider-Woman of Earth-807128.

Spider-UK became a sole survivor from Earth-833 after his home reality was destroyed during the Time Runs Out storyline and chose to remain in the reality of the defeated Inheritors along with Anya Corazon.

During the second volume of Spider-Verse set during the Secret Wars event, Spider-UK and Anya Corazon found themselves in the Battleworld domain of Arachnia with no memories of how they got there. They eventually teamed up with Spider-Woman of Earth-65, Spider-Ham, Spider-Man Noir, and Spider-Man of India, with neither of them remembering their previous encounter during the original Spider-Verse. After Gwen Stacy meets with the other spider-based heroes after her visit to Oscorp, they are interrupted by the arrival of the Sinister Six (consisting of Doctor Octopus, Electro, Kraven the Hunter, Sandman, Scorpion, and Vulture). The Sinister Six defeat the Spider-Men and bring them to Mayor Norman Osborn who states he wants to help them. This causes Spider-UK and the other Spider-Men to linger around Oscorp for a while. Spider-UK and the other Spider-Men join Spider-Woman of Earth-65 and Arachnia's Spider-Man into defeating Norman Osborn and the Sinister Six.

Following the conclusion of Secret Wars the team of six Spiders will rename itself and feature in a new ongoing series called Web Warriors, a name that was coined by Peter Parker from the Ultimate Spider-Man TV series during the original Spider-Verse.

During the "Spider-Geddon" storyline, Spider-UK has been keeping surveillance on Earth-3145 with the help of Spider-Girl, Spider-Punk, Spider-Man India, and Master Weaver. They find that the Inheritors have become malnourished since they were last seen. While Loomworld was being dismantled, Spider-UK talks to Master Weaver on how the other spider-based heroes have a world to go to while he lost his world during the Incursions as they both consider each other greatest friends. The two of them get alerted to an Inheritor Cloning Engine on Earth-616. The two of them figure out what is happening. On Earth-3145, Jennix has put the Spider-Bot heads to good use by harvesting their transmitters. As they are unable to send a kill signal to the Inheritor Cloning Engine, Spider-UK advises Master Weaver to call the Web Warriors. As Master Weaver states that nobody can fight the Inheritors and win, Spider-UK states that they'll die trying to keep another world from being destroyed. Spider-UK is among the Web Warriors that arrive on Earth-616 and take Miles to confront Superior Octopus. When Morlun emerges from the cloning machine, Spider-UK and Superior Octopus fight Morlun until Verna emerges and snaps Spider-UK's neck to keep Morlun from being harmed.

After the alternate Spider-Men defeat the Inheritors again, Billy's body is laid to rest on Earth-803, the home of Lady Spider.

During the "End of the Spider-Verse" storyline, a resurrected Billy is recruited by Madame Web to warn other Spider-People about Shathra's takeover of the Spider-Verse. While warning three other Spider-People, Billy is stung by one of Shathra's wasps and overtaken by the wasp goddess, before being knocked into another reality by Zarina Zahari, the second Spider-UK.

=== Zarina Zahari ===
Zarina Zahari as Spider-UK. Art by Zoe Thorogood.

In a lead-up to the End of the Spider-Verse storyline, Zarina Zahari is a young girl and gamer living in Earth-834's London who gained spider-like abilities and joined the organization W.H.O. (short for Weird Happenings Organization) as this reality's Spider-UK. After besting a wyvern, she was approached by Madame Web to help fight a Multiversal threat that is going to target the spider-powered characters.

== Powers and abilities ==
The Billy Braddock version of Spider-UK has powers similar to Spider-Man which include sticking and climbing on walls, a sixth sense to danger–which he struggles with–and being able to lift approximately 10 tons. He also has his own web-shooters. Spider-UK also makes use of an inter-dimensional device that enables him to travel to different dimensions.

The Zarina Zahari version of Spider-UK can generate bio-electricity where she wears special earrings to keep her bio-electrical abilities in line.

== In other media ==
=== Film ===
An original incarnation of Spider-UK named Malala Windsor appears in Spider-Man: Across the Spider-Verse, voiced by Sofia Barclay. Described as a composite of Malala Yousafzai and the House of Windsor, she is a member of Miguel O'Hara's Spider-Society from Earth-835.

=== Video games ===
- The Billy Braddock incarnation of Spider-UK appears as a playable character in Spider-Man Unlimited.
- The Billy Braddock incarnation of Spider-UK appears as a playable character in Lego Marvel Super Heroes 2.
- The Billy Braddock incarnation of Spider-UK's suit appears as an alternate suit for the titular character of Marvel's Spider-Man.
