= Spider-Ham =

Fictional comic book character, porcine parody of Spider-Man

Peter M Porker Spider-Ham
- Spider-Ham, taken from the variant cover of Spider-Man Annual #1 (June 2019); Art by Mark Armstrong

Publication information
- Publisher: Marvel Comics
- First appearance: Marvel Tails Starring Peter Porker, the Spectacular Spider-Ham (November 1983)
- Created by: Larry Hama (editor); Tom DeFalco (writer); Mark Armstrong (artist)

In-story information
- Full name: Peter Porker
- Species: Pig mutate
- Place of origin: Earth-8311
- Team affiliations: Web Warriors, The Scavengers
- Abilities: Enhanced strength, agility, intelligence and durability; Precognitive spider-sense; Ability to cling to surfaces; Medium-awareness and interaction

Spider-Ham (Peter Porker) is a superhero appearing in American comic books published by Marvel Comics. The character is an anthropomorphic pig and is a cartoon animal parody version of Spider-Man. He was created by Larry Hama, Tom DeFalco and Mark Armstrong.

He first appeared in the one-shot humor comic book Marvel Tails Starring Peter Porker, the Spectacular Spider-Ham (November 1983), which was then followed by an ongoing bi-monthly series, Peter Porker, the Spectacular Spider-Ham, under Marvel's Star Comics imprint, with both titles edited by Hama. The character existed on Earth-8311, which was a universe populated by anthropomorphic parody versions of the Marvel superheroes and supervillains. Spider-Ham made his feature film debut in Spider-Man: Into the Spider-Verse (2018), voiced by John Mulaney.

== Publication history ==
Marvel Tails Starring Peter Porker, the Spectactular Spider-Ham in "If He Should Punch Me"

Publication information
- Publisher: Marvel Comics
- Publication date: November 1983
- No. of issues: 1
- Main character(s): Spider-Ham; Captain Americat; Hulk-Bunny; Goose Rider

Spider-Ham was first featured as star of the 1983 humorous one-shot Marvel Tails, with a backup cast of other anthropomorphic talking-animal parody versions of popular Marvel superheroes, such as Captain Americat (a cat version of Captain America), Hulk-Bunny (a rabbit version of Hulk) and Goose Rider (a goose version of Ghost Rider).

Two years later, a solo series, titled Peter Porker, the Spectacular Spider-Ham debuted under Marvel's Star Comics imprint. The series, published bi-monthly, lasted seventeen issues before its cancellation in 1987. With the cancellation of Peter Porker, the Spectacular Spider-Ham, the character became a backup feature in Marvel Tales, a monthly reprint series showcasing Spider-Man's past adventures. Beginning with issue #201 (cover dated July 1987), these new Spider-Ham stories appeared in issues #201–212, 214–219, 223–230, 233, 236, 237, 239, 240, and 247 before ceasing altogether.

In issue #3 of What The--?! (cover dated October 1988), Porker meets with Raven the Hunter (a parody of Spider-Man's nemesis Kraven the Hunter) in a story that satirized the popular "Kraven's Last Hunt" storyline which had been featured a year earlier in Marvel's Spider-Man titles. Spider-Ham also makes appearances in issues #18, 20, 22, and 24 of What The--?! The 26th issue of What The--?! (cover dated fall 1993) features "Spider-Ham 15.88", a humorous take-off on Peter Parker's future counterpart, Miguel O'Hara a.k.a. Spider-Man 2099. The "15.88" is not seen as a year, but rather a humorous take on the price of a ham (the cover states that it was marked down from the original price of $20.99).

Spider-Ham has also appeared on the cover of Wha...Huh? #1, and was referred to as a fictional character in the Earth-616 Marvel Universe, in Generation X #52.

Spider-Man Family #1 (2005 one-shot) features a sixteen-page Spider-Girl story, in which May Parker (Peter Parker's daughter) watches a DVD showing a small portion of a fictional Spider-Ham animated series, discovering that it was created by one of Spider-Man's enemies, Jack O'Lantern. Here, Spider-Ham appears to mostly be a parody of Batman. Also in the issue, there is a partial reprint of Marvel Tails #1.

Spider-Ham was selected by fans and retailers to be the focus of the final variant cover by Mike Wieringo to the Spider-Man: The Other crossover, Amazing Spider-Man #528.

In January 2007, J. Michael Straczynski authored the Ultimate Civil War Spider-Ham one-shot, featuring Spider-Ham's attempt to find his missing "thought balloons" against a Civil War parody. The story does not fit in with previously established Spider-Ham continuity.

Tom Defalco returned to Spider-Ham's world in 2009, in the pages of Amazing Spider-Man Family #4–5. He introduces Swiney-Girl, the daughter of Spider-Ham and counterpart of Defalco's other creation Spider-Girl. Once again, the story strays away from the established, albeit loose, continuity of the original Spider-Ham stories by altering the character's origin and supporting characters, most notably in establishing Peter Porker as a natural-born pig bitten by a radioactive spider (directly mirroring Spider-Man's origin) and altering his love interest (a counterpart of Mary Jane Watson) from a water buffalo to a crane.

He fights alongside the X-Babies in issue #4 (March 2010) of their four-issue miniseries from 2009 to 2010.

To mark the anniversary of Peter Porker, The Spectacular Spider-Ham #1, Marvel released the Spider-Ham 25th Anniversary Special in July 2010, with Tom Defalco writing both Spider-Ham and Swiney-Girl stories. These stories feature most of Spider-Ham's original cast and origin, but incorporates the Mary Crane Watsow character from Amazing Spider-Man Family rather than her original counterpart.

In 2022, a graphic novel was published called Spider-Ham: Hollywood May-Ham. The book features Spider-Ham and Mary Jane Waterbuffalo attempt to make a documentary about his status as a superhero with Alfred Peacock (a parody of Alfred Hitchcock). After noticing mysterious happenings on set, he realizes Peacock is actually Mysteriape and attempts to defeat him and the Swinester Six. Mary Crane Watsow also makes a background appearance, establishing Watsow and Waterbuffalo to be two different red-haired women named Mary []ane whom Spider-Ham has dated.

== Fictional character biography ==
Peter Porker was born a spider and resided in the basement lab of May Porker, a scientist who invented an atomic-powered hairdryer to revolutionize the hair care industry. After dousing her head with water and activating the dryer, May accidentally irradiated herself and in a fit of delusion, bit Peter, transforming him into an anthropomorphic pig. Running from the Porker home, Peter soon came to realize that he still retained a spider's abilities:

"This is astounding! Am I a spider with the limitations of a pig? Or a pig with the proportionate strength and agility of a spider? I've become something greater than either spider or pig... I've become a Spider-Ham!" – Peter Porker, the Spectacular Spider-Ham #15 (May 1987)

After this startling series of events, Peter adopted the surname "Porker" dedicated himself and his new-found abilities to fighting injustice and the occasional animal parody of established Marvel Comics villains. May Porker's scientific genius was transferred to Peter, giving him the know-how to devise his webspinner gauntlets to replace his lost natural ability.

=== Misadventures ===
Porker, in his spider-themed alter-ego's first adventure, teamed up with Captain Americat, as they attempted to foil the nefarious plot of The Marauder, in a series of events that led to the creation of the Hulk-Bunny (Marvel Tails #1, "If He Should Punch Me").

Several months later, Spider-Ham encountered his main nemesis and one of his only recurring enemies in the form of Ducktor Doom, a duck parody of Doctor Doom (Peter Porker, the Spectacular Spider-Ham #1, "The Mysterious Island of Ducktor Doom"). Spider-Ham would meet again with Doom when Porker would foil the would-be world conqueror's plot to create an army of living super vegetables (Peter Porker, the Spectacular Spider-Ham #6, "Salad Daze").

Other notable menaces Porker would face along the way include the Bull-Frog (a parody of the Marvel villain Man-Bull), the Buzzard (an opossum take on the Spider-Man adversary the Vulture), Hogzilla (a swine counterpart to the more popular Godzilla), and the King-Pig (seemingly the swine equivalent of Marvel's mob-boss the Kingpin).

Three characters, not parallels to anybody in the Spider-Man series, also begin in #1: J. Jeremiah Jackal, Jr. (J. Jonah Jackal's nephew), Bunson Bunny and Upton Adam Stray (a cat with shades), all junior trainees at the Daily Beagle. They acquire super-powers in #15, encouraging Spider-Ham in his already made decision to abandon his super-hero career, but they fumble their first mission, forcing Peter Porker to resume his alter-ego as Spider-Ham. Further misadventures of the Beagle Brigadiers were presented within the back-up stories in Marvel Tales.

The series also included back-up stories featuring such characters as Deerdevil (Daredevil), Goose Rider (Ghost Rider) and the Fantastic Fur (the Fantastic Four).

=== Marvel Zombies ===
When Spider-Ham accidentally travels to the Marvel Zombies universe, he is suddenly zombified by a group of zombies, namely Captain America, Hulk, and Wolverine. It appears that he is directly shot in the head by an energy bullet by Ultron, effectively killing him but, in a zombie state, Spider-Ham turned into Ham-ibal Lecter (Hannibal Lecter).

=== Spider-Verse ===
During the Spider-Verse storyline which featured Spider-Men from various alternate realities, Spider-Ham became a member of the Spider-Army fighting against the Inheritors. He played a crucial role in the final confrontation when he switches places with Benjy Parker (the baby brother of Spider-Girl of Earth-982) – one of the three sacrifices needed for the Inheritors to destroy the Spider-Totems – allowing Ben Parker to get Benjy to safety.

=== Secret Wars ===
During the Secret Wars event when all universes were destroyed and their remains formed a single planet called Battleworld, Spider-Ham found himself the only pig in the domain of the Battleworld called Arachnia and ended up as the captive of its Mayor, Norman Osborn. He was rescued by Spider-Gwen, and the two eventually discovered and teamed up with other spider-powered people (Spider-Man Noir, Spider-Man India, Spider-UK and Anya Corazon), neither of whom remembered their previous encounter during the original Spider-Verse.

=== Web Warriors ===
Following the conclusion of Secret Wars, the team of six Spiders that formed during the event feature in a new ongoing series called Web Warriors, a name that was coined by the Peter Parker of the Ultimate Spider-Man TV series during the original Spider-Verse.

== In other media ==
=== Television ===
- Spider-Ham appears in Ultimate Spider-Man in two different forms.
  - In the first season episode "Run Pig Run", Loki transforms Spider-Man into an anthropomorphic pig resembling Spider-Ham during Asgardsreia, a holiday where Asgardians go on a day-long hunt. With the help of Thor, Phil Coulson, Nick Fury and his fellow S.H.I.E.L.D. trainees, "Spider-Ham" evades the Executioner and his Asgardian hunters until he is returned to normal.
  - Spider-Ham proper appears in the third and fourth seasons, voiced by Benjamin Diskin. This version is a pig who got his powers from a spider that fell into his Aunt May's vitamin pancake batter, which transferred said vitamins and powers to him. After becoming a superhero and joining his universe's Avengers however, J. Jonah Jackal turned the public against him and forced him to quit. In the episode "The Spider-Verse", Spider-Ham encounters the "prime" Spider-Man, who encourages him to become Spider-Ham once again.

=== Film ===
- Spider-Ham appears in Spider-Man: Into the Spider-Verse, voiced by John Mulaney. This iteration follows similar anthropomorphic animal behavior as seen in cartoons from the golden age of American animation and bears a resemblance to Porky Pig from the Looney Tunes franchise. He arrives in Miles Morales' universe along with Spider-Man Noir and Peni Parker due to the Kingpin's machinations before teaming up with them, Morales, Peter B. Parker and Spider-Woman to return to their respective home universes.
  - Spider-Ham appears in the prequel short film Spider-Ham: Caught in a Ham, voiced again by Mulaney. He battles and defeats Doctor Crawdaddy until an interdimensional portal appears and whisks him away, leading into his appearance in the film.
  - Spider-Ham makes a non-speaking cameo appearance in Spider-Man: Across the Spider-Verse.
  - Spider-Ham is planned to appear in Spider-Man: Beyond the Spider-Verse, with Mulaney reprising his role.
  - Mulaney also expressed interest in a potential spin-off film starring Spider-Ham, describing its plot as a Watergate-like story along the lines of The Post or All the President's Men while focusing on the character's career as a reporter.
- Mulaney returned to voice Spider-Ham in the animated short film Back on the Air, which was created to promote the character's appearance in the video game Marvel Contest of Champions (see below).

=== Video games ===
- Spider-Ham makes a cameo appearance in a mid-credits scene depicted in Spider-Man: Shattered Dimensions, voiced by an uncredited, former Activision associate producer Kevin Umbricht. He answers Madame Web's call to save the multiverse, but arrives after the Amazing Spider-Man, Spider-Man Noir, Spider-Man 2099, and the Ultimate Spider-Man already did so.
- Spider-Ham appears as a support card in Ultimate Marvel vs. Capcom 3's "Heroes vs. Heralds" mode.
- Spider-Ham appears as an unlockable character in Marvel Super Hero Squad Online.
- Spider-Ham makes cameo appearances in Spider-Man: Edge of Time.
- Spider-Ham appears in Marvel Heroes.
- Spider-Ham appears as a playable character in Spider-Man Unlimited, voiced again by Benjamin Diskin.
- Spider-Ham appears in Marvel Avengers Academy, voiced by Christopher McCann.
- Spider-Ham appears as an unlockable playable character in Lego Marvel Super Heroes 2.
- Spider-Ham appears as a playable character in Marvel Puzzle Quest.
- Spider-Ham appears as a playable character in Marvel Contest of Champions, voiced again by John Mulaney.
- Spider-Ham, based on the Spider-Man: Across the Spider-Verse incarnation, appears as an emote in Fortnite Battle Royale.
- Spider-Ham appears in Marvel Snap.

=== Miscellaneous ===
- Spider-Ham appears in the Twisted ToyFare Theatre parody comic "Four Webbings and a Funeral" as part of The Wizard Spider-Man Special. In the comic, Spider-Ham appears as one of the entrees being served at Spider-Man's funeral.
- Spider-Ham appears in Marvel Battleworld: Mystery of the Thanostones and Treachery at Twilight, voiced by Jesse Inocalla.
- Spider-Ham appears in the web-series Marvel TL;DR.

== Reception ==
In August 2009, TIME listed Spider-Ham as one of the "Top 10 Oddest Marvel Characters".

== Collected editions ==
Title	Material collected	Published date	ISBN
Peter Porker, The Spectacular Spider-Ham Volume 1	Marvel Tails #1, Peter Porker, The Spectacular Spider-Ham #1–5	June 2010	978-0785143529
Spider-Man: Animal Magnetism	Spider-Ham 25th Anniversary Special, Ultimate Civil War Spider-Ham and Spider-Man: Back in Quack, Top Dog #10	February 2011	978-0785151937
Peter Porker, The Spectacular Spider-Ham: The Complete Collection Vol. 1	Marvel Tails #1, Peter Porker, The Spectacular Spider-Ham #1–17	July 2019	978-1302918439
Peter Porker, The Spectacular Spider-Ham: The Complete Collection Vol. 2	Marvel Tales #201–212, 214–219, 223–230, 233, 236–237, 239–240, 247, What The--?! #20, Ultimate Civil War: Spider-Ham #1, Spider-Ham 25th Anniversary Special #1, Spider-Man Annual (vol. 3) #1, material from What The--?! #3, 18, 22, 24, 26, Spider-Verse #1	February 2021	978-1302923662
Spider-Ham: Aporkalypse Now	Spider-Ham #1–5	August 2020	978-1302921620

== See also ==
- Just'a Lotta Animals, a concept by DC Comics featuring anthropomorphic animal parody versions of DC superheroes and supervillains similar to Larval (Marvel).
- Marvel Apes, an alternate Marvel reality featuring ape versions of Marvel characters.
