= Anansi (Marvel Comics) =

Kwaku Anansi

Publication information
- First appearance: Thor #398 (December 1988) (unnamed appearance); The Amazing Spider-Man (vol. 2) #48
- Created by: Tom DeFalco and Ron Frenz

In-story information
- Species: Vodu
- Notable aliases: A. Nancy, Spider-God, Great Weaver

Anansi is a fictional character appearing in American comic books published by Marvel Comics, based on the Akan folktale character of the same name. The character first appeared as an unnamed god in Thor #398 by Tom DeFalco and Ron Frenz and made his named appearance in The Amazing Spider-Man (vol. 2) #48 by J. Michael Straczynski and John Romita Jr.

== Fictional character biography ==
Anansi was a member of the Vodu, deities worshipped by the tribes of Africa, — a veneration that extended even unto the nation of Wakanda.

According to Ezekiel Sims and the Ashanti tribe in Ghana, Anansi was the first Spider-Man who used his powers to travel through Africa. Anansi made a deal with the Sky God, Nyame, offering his eternal service in exchange for more enlightenment and, after transmitting his power and knowledge to the Great Web, vanished. His temple was then used by Peter Parker to defeat the totemic wasp entity, Shathra and was then used as a battle arena, when Peter and Ezekiel started fighting to appease the totemic entity Gatekeeper.

During the infestation of Manhattan Island, Anansi was disguised as a pest specialist known as A. Nancy and visited Hercules at his workplace. Hercules helped Nancy to sneak into Arachne's apartment to steal her Tapestry. After that, Nancy was attacked by Elektra who stole the tapestry, but left Nancy alive even though Baba Yaga had ordered her to kill him.

In the 2024 event Blood Hunt, Blade (who was possessed by Varnae) transforms Miles Morales into a vampire. He is unable to be completely cured, but he and all other vampires gain immunity to sunlight. Later, Miles meets with Anansi, who offers to cure him.

=== Other versions of Anansi ===
- In Spider-Man: Fairy Tales, a version of Anansi appears, where he faces several gods during his quest.
- During the "Spider-Verse" event, a version of Anansi is recruited by Spider-UK into joining the Spider-Army to battle the Inheritors.
- Anansi is also the name of a spider-like race belonging to the Originators, mystic beings who lived in Wakanda before humans.

=== Anansi in other media ===
Anansi appears in Spider-Man Unlimited.
