= Zoe Thorogood =

British comic book author and illustrator

- Born: June 7, 1998 (age 28); Bradford, England, United Kingdom
- Occupation: Comics artist
- Years active: 2019-present

Zoe Thorogood is a British comic book author and artist. She is the author of The Impending Blindness of Billie Scott and It's Lonely at the Centre of the Earth, as well as a run of Hack/Slash through 2022-to-2023, in which series creator Tim Seeley resumed writing. In addition to her work on independent comics, she also co-created the character of Spider-UK (Zarina Zahari) together with Ramzee for Marvel Comics and wrote multiple stories in anthologies published by DC Comics.

== Biography ==
Thorogood was born on June 7, 1998 in Bradford, England. She studied video game art at De Montfort University in Leicester, which led her to an internship in 2017 creating design concepts at Splash Damage. She continued her studies at Teesside University between 2018 and 2019.

In 2026 she married Harley Poe frontman Joseph Whiteford.

== Career ==
In 2019, Thorogood began working in comics as a freelance artist.

She attended a convention organized in London by the American independent comic book publisher Image Comics, where this publisher was impressed with Thorogood's portfolio. Image introduced her to several other comic artist including Kieron Gillen, of whom later approved her as "the future of comics".

Her first graphic novel, The Impending Blindness of Billie Scott, was published in 2020. While she has suffered from sight problems since the age of 3, in 2017 she learned that her retina was slowly being detached, and that she could eventually go blind. Although inspired by her personal story, the character of Billie Scott is not an incarnation of Thorogood, as she would later explain in her second graphic novel.

Thorogood's second graphic novel, It's Lonely at the Centre of the Earth, was published in 2022 through Image. It's Lonely... is an autobiography, focusing on Zoe's life through the last six months of 2021. It was not originally intended for publication; it was written during a depressive period. Finally, she decided to share a few illustrations on the Internet. She received messages from readers who identified with her work and her experience and felt that her work deserved to become a full-fledged book.

Her next comic was Hack/Slash: Back to School, set in the universe created by Tim Seeley. She is also the writer of the comic Life Is Strange: Forget-Me-Not, adapted from the video game Life Is Strange: True Colors, with art by Claudia Leonard and Andrea Izzo, published by Titan Comics.

In 2026, it was announced that Thorogood's next project would be Vampire on Aisle Six. The series, made in collaboration with her husband Joe Whiteford, revolves around a vampire named Luka who becomes trapped in a grocery store after getting kicked out of the apartment of his girlfriend, Nikki. It was also revealed that the series will be released with an accompanying EP, with music by Whiteford and Thorogood.

== Works ==
=== As writer and artist ===
- The Impending Blindness of Billie Scott, Avery Hill Publishing, 2020
- It's Lonely at the Centre of the Earth, Image Comics, 2022
- Creepshow Vol.2 #3 (OF 5), Image Comics, 2023
- Hack Slash: Back To School, Image Comics, 2023–2024
- "Harley Quinn and the Seven Sidekicks" in Harley Quinn: Black+White+Redder #4, DC Comics, 2023
- "For James" in Ice Cream Man #43, Image Comics, 2025

=== Writing ===
- Life Is Strange: Forget-Me-Not (art by Claudia Leonardi, colours by Andrea Izzo), Titan Comics, 2023–2024

=== Art ===
- Poppy's Inferno (written by Poppy and Ryan Cady, art by Amilcar Pinna & Zoe Thorogood), Z2 Comics, 2020
- HAHA #2 (written by W. Maxwell Prince), Image Comics, 2021
- Rain (adapted by David M. Booher from a novella by Joe Hill), Image Comics, 2022
- "The Hunt" in DC Pride 2022 #1 (written by Dani Fernandez), DC Comics, 2023

=== Cover art ===
- Eve #5 Variant Cover (written by Victor Lavalle, art by Jo Mi-Gyeong), Boom! Studios
- Overwatch: Tracer-London Calling #3 Variant Cover (written by Mariko Tamaki, art by Babs Tarr), Dark Horse Comics, 2021
- Crowded #11 Cover B (written by Christopher Sebela, art by Triona Farrell, Ro Stein & Ted Brandt), Image Comics, 2020
- The Department Of Truth #9 (written by James Tynion IV, art by Martin Simmonds), Image Comics, 2021
- Home Sick Pilots #7 Cover B (written by Dan Watters, art by Caspar Wijngaard), Image Comics, 2021
- Ice Cream Man #25 Cover B (written by W. Maxwell Prince, art by Chris O'Halloran & Martín Morazzo), Image Comics, 2021
- What's The Furthest Place From Here? Cover B (written by Matthew Rosenberg, art by Tyler Boss), Image Comics, 2023
- Lilith #1 (written by Corin Howell, art by Corin Howell, Warnia Sahadewa, Jim Campbell & Tim Daniel), Vault Comics, 2024

=== Others ===
- Created the character Spider-UK (Zarina Zahari) together with Ramzee, first appearance in Edge of Spider-Verse Vol. 2 #1, Marvel Comics, 2022

== Awards ==
- Nominated for 2023 Eisner Award for Best Writer/Artist for It's Lonely at the Centre of the Earth
- Nominated for 2023 Eisner Award for Best Graphic Memoir for It's Lonely at the Centre of the Earth
- Nominated for 2023 Eisner Award for Best Adaptation From Another Medium for Rain
- Nominated for 2023 Eisner Award for Best Painter/Multimedia Artist for Rain
- Nominated for 2023 Eisner Award for Best Cover Artist for Rain
- Awarded the 2023 Russ Manning Most Promising Newcomer Award.
