= Spider-Ham: Caught in a Ham =

2019 animated superhero short film

- Intertitle for the film
- Directed by: Miguel Jiron
- Written by: Miguel Jiron
- Based on: Spider-Ham by: Larry Hama; Tom DeFalco; Mark Armstrong
- Produced by: David Schulenburg
- Starring: John Mulaney; Aaron LaPlante
- Edited by: Arthur D. Noda; George Soto
- Music by: Dave Eber; Tyler Rice
- Animation by: Chris Airgood; Virgile Bage; Riley Boydston; George Chung; Nigel Clark; Aaron Cowdery; Luke Freitag; Ian Miller; Daran Sudric
- Backgrounds by: Joey Chou; Bill Cleveland; Megan Willoughby
- Production companies: Sony Pictures Animation; Marvel Entertainment; Titmouse, Inc.
- Distributed by: Sony Pictures Home Entertainment
- Release date: February 26, 2019
- Running time: 4 minutes
- Country: United States
- Language: English

Spider-Ham: Caught in a Ham (also simply known as Caught in a Ham) is a 2019 American animated superhero short film featuring the Marvel Comics character Spider-Ham and produced by Sony Pictures Animation. Directed and written by Miguel Jiron, it is a prequel to the 2018 film Spider-Man: Into the Spider-Verse, and was released as a special feature on that film's digital release on February 26, 2019, and as part of the film's Blu-ray and DVD releases on March 19. John Mulaney reprises his role as Spider-Ham from the film, moments before he entered a portal into the Spider-Verse.

On September 20, 2019, Caught in a Ham was officially released on YouTube by Marvel HQ under license from Sony Pictures Animation.

== Plot ==
As Spider-Ham is about to enjoy a hot dog, he finds himself kidnapped by Doctor Crawdaddy. Through fast thinking and criticism of Doctor Crawdaddy's chosen moniker, Spider-Ham manages to defeat the villain and escape. While walking away, Spider-Ham is swallowed in by a portal taking him directly into an alternative dimension. (Note: As depicted in Spider-Man: Into the Spider-Verse (2018).) As the short ends, the hot dog pops out of the portal.

== Cast ==
- John Mulaney as Spider-Ham
- Aaron LaPlante as Doctor Crawdaddy

== Production ==
Following the successful release of Spider-Man: Into the Spider-Verse in December, producers Phil Lord and Christopher Miller said they were planning to produce two additional Spider-Man-themed animated features to go along with the original film's Blu-ray and digital releases. The pair also expressed their interest in creating a Spider-Ham short film, with Phil stating that he wanted to "spin off the Spider-Ham cinematic television universe. One thing at a time." Later that same month, producers Amy Pascal and Avi Arad also mentioned their interest in making a spin-off film based on the character. Following talk about the potential spin-off and John Mulaney's pitch for a Spider-Ham movie, the project was confirmed by Sony Pictures Animation on February 18, 2019.

The film was directed and written by Miguel Jiron.

== Release ==
The film was released on February 26, 2019 as a special feature on Spider-Man: Into the Spider-Verse digital release and as part of the film's Blu-ray and DVD releases on March 19. The film was later released on September 20, 2019, on YouTube by Marvel HQ under license from Sony Pictures Animation.

== Reception ==
The short film was highly praised by critics. Mike Phalin, writing for ScienceFiction.com, said the short was "pretty good", expressing that "Sony's version of Spider-Ham [was] a bit of a cross between Chuck Jones's version Bugs Bunny [sic] and Daffy Duck under director Bob Clampett." Ashley Robinson, writing for Major Spoilers, complimented the imagery presented in the short as well as John Mulaney's voice acting in the film.
