= Spider-Man Unlimited (video game) =

2014 endless runner video game

- Developer: Gameloft Barcelona
- Publisher: Gameloft
- Director: Baptiste Marmey
- Producer: Steve Melanson
- Composer: Pascal Dion
- Platforms: Android, iOS, Windows Phone
- Release: WW: September 10, 2014
- Genre: Endless runner
- Mode: Single-player

Spider-Man Unlimited was an endless runner game developed by Gameloft Barcelona and published by Gameloft. It is based on the Marvel Comics superhero Spider-Man. The player controls the title character and his alternate versions during his fight against the members of the Sinister Six and their multiverse counterparts. The game's main mode features definitive goals in contrast to the traditional aim of running as far as possible. The game was also known for having regular, special, time-limited, community events.

Announced in June 2014, Spider-Man Unlimited was released for Android, iOS and Windows Phone on September 10, 2014. Starting in October 2014, Gameloft released several updates that added chapters to the story mode, Spider-Men and Spider-Women, enemies, events, and stages. The game was discontinued in March 2019. It has been downloaded 30 million times and has been well received by gaming critics. Reviewers praised the game's controls, sound, animation and the variety of characters, while criticizing its energy system, which they considered a limit to its playability.

== Plot ==
After Spider-Man defeats a figure known as the Gold Goblin, Nick Fury tells him the Green Goblin has used a portal to assemble a multiverse Sinister Six and plans to take over Spider-Man's dimension. S.H.I.E.L.D. used the portal to assemble alternative versions of Spider-Man and other spider-powered heroes like Spider-Girl, Spider-Ham, and Spider-Man 2099 to aid in the battle. Spider-Man pursues the Green Goblin and his alternative versions. After he defeats the alternative Goblins, Spider-Man fights various versions of Vulture, Electro, Sandman, Doctor Octopus, and Mysterio, as well as the Sinister Soldiers—armored soldiers working for the multiverse Sinister Six.

== Gameplay ==
This screenshot from the Unlimited Mode shows the Ben Reilly Spider-Man running towards S.H.I.E.L.D. bombs that can be flung to hit the boss on the top of the screen, Red Vulture. HUD features clockwise from bottom left: combo count, the boss's health, the remaining time to defeat the boss, the player's score and score multiplier, another person's score, and the number of vials the player has.

Spider-Man Unlimited is an endless runner game in which Spider-Man runs across New York rooftops, including that of the Oscorp building, as well as Sinister Six spaceships and a giant Doctor Octopus machine, as he dodges obstacles, defeats enemies, and collect power-ups and vials. Regular enemies are defeated by slide attacks and punches, while bosses requires the player to fling projectiles at them. Players earn combos by overthrowing enemies; almost hitting an obstacle or going through a ring also increases the player's combo count. Sections in which Spider-Man swings through streets, climbs the sides of buildings and free-falls from buildings are interspersed with the running portions of the game.

The game has a story mode that, in contrast to traditional endless runners, features definitive goals—for example defeating a predetermined number of enemies, collecting random items, reaching a specific point, or defeating the boss. It is divided into chapters, called "issues", each having 5 main missions that end with a boss fight, and various side missions. Some missions can only be completed by a specific version of Spider-Man. Others were restricted to characters of a certain level; but with the third update, it was modified to require a certain amount of "Spidey Power", or the player's team multiplier. By completing missions, the player can win experience points to reach the next level and in-game currency: regular vials or rarer ISO-8. Players can improve their power-ups and buy alternate versions of Spider-Man by spending vials.

To get a new version of Spider-Man as a "card", players can use their vials or ISO-8 to open portals to an alternate dimension from which a randomly selected Spider-Man arrives. Each card can be leveled up and has a star rating called the level cap. To level up a card, players can earn experience points during a run. A card can also be sacrificed to level up another, and by fusing two equal cards, players can increase a card's level cap. By using vials, which usually gives players a 3- or 4-star character, players have a small chance of acquiring a rare version of Spider-Man, while ISO-8 ensures they get a rare one. Each card has a score multiplier that is raised once a Spider is leveled up and a special ability. For example, Spider-Armor increases by 30% the score earned by running. Each card occupies a character slot, of which six are available. Players can unlock slots by completing an issue, or can buy it using vials and, as the price increases, ISO-8s.

In addition to the story mode, the game features an unlimited, de facto endless runner-style mode and time-limited events, both of which are score-based games. The leaderboard of the unlimited mode awards prizes based on daily rank. In events, players can compete against other players and win rewards; players earn the Spider-Man featured in that event by ranking at certain positions on the leaderboard or reaching certain objectives. The seventh update added an alliance mode for online players; it is a territorial competition to gain the possession of New York streets, in which a player can join an alliance or create one's own to confront other's alliances. Additionally, players can complete extra missions called "Spidey Ops", in which one or more characters, up to a maximum of six, become unavailable for a set period of time; when they return they gain experience and vials.

The game's energy system gives players 5 energy points at the start. Beginning a run in any mode costs one point, and it takes 10 minutes for a point to recharge. Players can pay to refill energy by spending ISO-8s. Players can make friends at the leaderboard; once per day they can send and request 5 energy points, which are stored in their inboxes.

== Development and release ==
Spider-Man Unlimited was developed by Gameloft Barcelona and published by Paris-based company Gameloft. Its soundtrack was composed by Pascal Dion, and it was directed by Baptiste Marmey, produced by Steve Melanson, designed by Corentin Delprat, and programmed by Jerome Chen. At a press release on June 6, 2014, Gameloft announced it had formed a partnership with Marvel Entertainment and was developing a Spider-Man-based game for smartphones and tablets. Later that month, during the Electronic Entertainment Expo, an announcement trailer was exhibited and the game was made playable. A second trailer was shown at San Diego Comic-Con that July. The game was released for iOS, Android OS, and Windows Phone on September 10.

The idea for the game was first conceived as the production team thought that endless runner games were popular but were always too similar. To create an endless runner that would differentiate itself from others in the genre, the staff focused on Spider-Man's main powers, which originally led to a swinger-only game. However, they found it "a bit boring", and it was complicated to have boss fights and to add new systems and gameplay styles. Then they reconceptualized the game as a runner with elements of swinging, fighting, wall-climbing, and free-falling. The storyline of the game was created to focus on the Sinister Six and the multiple versions of Spider-Man. Gameloft was allowed to explore other stories such as the Spider-Verse, but they were required to consult with Marvel to decide which were to be featured. The product manager, Tatiana Nahai, was the responsible for choosing among the options and she discusses the ideas with the narrative designer. After the narrative designer creates the main plotline and dialogues, they consult Marvel writer Fred Van Lente for feedback. The same process of having Marvel feedback occurs for the addition of new characters and environments. Environments were created by the level design team, which was responsible for deciding which obstacles or types of boss attacks fit best, based on how distinct they would be from other levels. As new updates were released, new environments like the New York Highline, 2099 New York and snowy New York were added.

The animation techniques for the characters were based on previous Spider-Man games, films and comics. Characters were designed to be balanced and, with this in mind, the production team tried to implement similar abilities for the Spider-Men and Spider-Women, despite giving them different skills. Originally, Marvel only allowed the staff to use 30 characters, but the developers felt it was limited—only having 1 female character, for example—and requested more variety. Requests on their forums, Facebook page, subreddit, and Twitch were also considered, but they always focused on thematic releases; for example, "Monster Spiders" (Spider-X and Tarantula) or dimensional variations of Spider-Man. Since the inception of the game, the production team planned to add a character with a level cap higher than 100 as they imagined players would eventually master all the available characters. This resulted in the creation of the "Titan" characters to expand the game replay value. To avoid overpowering them and reducing other characters' value, however, they made Titans difficult to acquire.

Gameloft frequently released updates to the game. The main reason for adding new updates was to group characters thematically and to synchronize with Marvel Comics. As such, the first update, released in October 2014, started the "Spider-Verse" storyline; this remained the main theme until the fourth update, released in April following year. The main villains of this storyline, the Inheritors, were faced in the "Great Hunt" event; first Karn and Morlun, then Daemos and Jennix, and ultimately Solus. The seventh update, released in September 2015, added events and environments based on the Spider-Island storyline into the game. The eighth, released in October, continued Spider-Island, and added Amazing Spider-Man: Renew Your Vows character Annie Parker and costumes from the All-New, All-Different storyline. The game even anticipated the comics when a new Spider-Woman's costume debuted in the second update, released in December 2014, before its March 2015 comics debut.

The updates also contributed to the main story mode; the first added Sandman as its boss, while the fourth added Doctor Octopus, the sixth added Mysterio, and Venom was added in the August 2016 update. New characters were frequently added through the updates, and some of them, such as Spider-Gwen, Silk, Spider-Punk, and Aracnido Jr., made their first appearances in Spider-Man Unlimited. Other common update content included thematic fights against specific villains, such as Jack O'Lantern, Hydro-Man, and Silver Sable. The sixth improved objective counters for events, while the seventh added short mission-style events. Some updates like the first and the sixth also included bug fixes, while the first adapted it to run on Windows Phone devices with 512 megabytes of RAM, and the sixth also made it compatible with the MFi Program.

Coinciding with the release of Avengers: Infinity War on April 27, 2018, the game released a tie-in event involving Thanos in his quest to collect the Infinity Stones. The 32nd update of the game also featured the release of the Iron Spider based on the movie incarnation as well as the introduction of other characters, particularly those from the Venomverse story. On December 20, Gameloft announced that the game would receive no more updates and would be shut down by March 31, 2019.

== Reception ==
Reception

Aggregate score
Aggregator	Score
Metacritic	79/100

Review scores
Publication	Score
Pocket Gamer	7/10
TouchArcade	4/5
148Apps	4/5

Spider-Man Unlimited has been well received by customers; as of December 2014, it has been downloaded more than 30 million times. Media outlets noted it had a "dedicated" and "hardcore" fanbase. Critics have provided "generally favorable reviews", according to Metacritic, which assigns a score of 79 out of 100 based on 10 reviews. Jim Squires, writing for Gamezebo, stated the game "is both how you do a runner right AND how you do a superhero game right". Shaun Musgrave of TouchArcade recommended it to both Spider-Man fans and endless runner fans. Polygon's Justin McElroy said "Spider-Man Unlimited is a top-notch game all on its own". The staff of Download.com appreciated its combination of "great graphics, super-spidey skills, and the old-school feel of a classic runner game". For 148Apps.com, Jennifer Allen wrote, "Despite [some problems], Spider-Man Unlimited is a surprisingly well-made endless runner". Peter Willington of Pocket Gamer wrote that those waiting for a Spider-Man game would "be disappointed" but that it is "a high quality auto-runner".

Squires, Willington, and McElroy praised the responsiveness of the game's controls, and the Download.com staff enjoyed its intuitiveness. Regarding the audio, Musgrave and Willington praised the voice acting, Musgrave commended the soundtrack, and Willington praised the sound effects. Musgrave, Willington, and McElroy also commended the animation; Musgrave and Willington mainly appreciated the comic book-like style, and Musgrave and McElroy the varied environments. Squires said it has "a perfect mix of speed, humor, missions, and collectibles", while McElroy and the Download.com staff highlighted the possibility of having collectible Spider-Men. Squires and Musgrave praised the variability between running, swinging, climbing and free-falling; the former stated, "the result is a game that continues to feel fresh long after the hundredth play".

Musgrave commented, "the art style does sometimes hinder the gameplay", and Willington was critical of the story mode, which he said had a "weak plot" and lacked character development. The Download.com staff also noted some lags and software bugs, while Musgrave and Allen stated the controls sometimes had problems recognizing swipes. Squires commented that a problem of the game is its level cap limit when the player is using only one character. However, according to Musgrave, the game's energy system was "the biggest point of controversy"; he, Willington, Allen, and Mike Fahey of Kotaku criticized it. In opposition, McElroy said the energy system is a "microtransaction hook" that is easily surmountable without spending any real money, and Squires affirmed that because of the duration of a run it "ends up feeling a lot fairer in practice than it sounds on paper". While David Chapman of Common Sense Media generally praised the game, saying it "does a great job of capturing the feel of the comic books", he was critical of its frequent adverstising and pop-ups that contributed to what he described as an "ever-present push to buy something".

When Gameloft announced Spider-Man Unlimited would be discontinued, Ryan Winslett of CinemaBlend and Tyler Fischer of ComicBook.com noted that fans would be disappointed as the game's plot was not concluded, resulting on a cliffhanger. However, Fischer noted some fans were already expecting it, while Winslett stated it is not rare for a mobile game to be shut down without any previous announcement, which made the three-month warning sound good. Winslett also found the discontinuance to be surprising as Spider-Man–related properties at the time such as Spider-Man: Homecoming, Spider-Man: Into the Spider-Verse, and Marvel's Spider-Man were commercially successful.
