= Alternative versions of Spider-Man =

Spider-Man
- Publisher: Marvel Comics
- First appearance: Amazing Fantasy #15 (August 1962)
- Created by: Stan Lee; Steve Ditko
- See also: Spider-Man in other media Spider-Man in video games Spider-Man in television List of incarnations of Spider-Man

"Spider-Man" is the name of multiple comic book superheroes from the Marvel Comics Multiverse. The original and most well-known is Peter Parker, created by Stan Lee and Steve Ditko and originating from the Earth-616 universe. Within the mainstream Marvel Universe there have been other characters that have taken up the mantle, such as Ben Reilly, Mac Gargan, Otto Octavius, and Kurt Wagner.

Outside of the mainstream universe, there are different incarnations of Spider-Man in alternate universes. Popular examples include characters such as the Ultimate version of Peter Parker and his successor, Miles Morales, an alternate future version named Miguel O'Hara, a daughter of Peter Parker named Mayday Parker in the MC2 universe, a different take on Peter Parker in the Great Depression era, a universe where Peter's supporting character, Gwen Stacy, becomes Spider-Woman instead of Parker, along with talking animal parodies like Spider-Ham. Originally, these characters were depicted as separate from each other, but they have crossed over in storylines like "Spider-Verse", "Web Warriors", and Spider-Geddon, in teams such as the Spider-Army and Web-Warriors, where the many different versions of Spider-themed characters are the major protagonists of the storyline. Some of these characters were temporarily merged in the same universe in the 2015 comic book series Secret Wars as a part of the Spider-Man family.

Some of these characters have appeared in media outside of comics, most notably the animated film Spider-Man: Into the Spider-Verse (2018) and its sequel, Spider-Man: Across the Spider-Verse (2023). There have been different versions of Spider-Man originally introduced in other media that have appeared in comics as well.

== Prime Earth (Earth-616) ==
Peter Parker, the Spider-Man of Earth-616, is the original variation of the character and appears in nearly every single piece of other media surrounding Spider-Man.

== Other universes ==
Other related characters exist in alternative versions of the Marvel Universe called the Multiverse. These characters originally appeared in their own continuity but later on crossed over with the mainstream Spider-Man family. In 2015 all the alternate comic book universes were destroyed and only a few characters joined with Earth-616 characters in its own universe including various Spider-Men.

=== DC crossovers (Earth-7642) ===
In some intercompany crossovers with DC Comics, Spider-Man has worked alongside a Superman based on the Earth One version, twice, once to defeat Doctor Octopus and Lex Luthor and the other to stop Doctor Doom from providing Parasite with long-term access to the powers of the Hulk and Wonder Woman. He also worked alongside a Batman based on the post-Crisis version, to defeat Carnage and the Joker, the two later collaborating to defeat the Kingpin and Ra's al Ghul, with Fisk eventually aiding the heroes in the end.

=== Deadpool: Samurai (Earth-346) ===
In the alternate universe Deadpool: Samurai manga series, which takes place on Earth-346, Deadpool receives an offer to join Samurai Squad, the Japanese division of the Avengers. Before leaving for Japan, Deadpool announces his departures to Spider-Man, who agrees to grant him a request before he leaves. Deadpool requests to go web-slinging with Spider-Man, and so Spider-Man allows Deadpool to hold onto him as he swings through New York City. In Japan, Deadpool meets Sakura Spider (Haruka Hida (飛騨遥, Hida Haruka)), another spider-powered hero native to the country. Later, Sakura Spider is trapped on Earth-616 by the events of End of the Spider-Verse, facing off against Otto Octavius in Spider-Man: Octo-Girl.

=== Earth X (Earth-9997) ===
Spider-Man of Earth-9997, art by Javier Rodriguez

In the series Earth X and its sequels, set on Earth-9997, Peter Parker's identity as Spider-Man is revealed and he is no longer a superhero. In time, he becomes overweight and resembles his late uncle as he ages. After the death of his wife, his daughter bonds to the Venom symbiote and fights crime, much to his dismay. During the course of the series, he becomes a police officer. Three other related characters appear.

In the same universe, an African American homeless man was mutated by Terrigen Mist, gaining red patterned skin resembling Spider-Man's suit and the ability to generate illusions. He went by the alias "Spiders Man".

=== A.I.M. Pocket Reality (Earth-13584) ===
On this Earth, Spider-Man underwent a further mutation that turned his skin blue, caused him to develop a spider-like language, and enabled him to make webs that have an effect on Iron Man's armors and Doctor Strange's magic, while emitting a smell that repels the monsters on the Thing's side. Using these webs, Spider-Man surrounded a section of Hell's Kitchen to act as his territory for him and his gang (consisting of Daredevil, Hawkeye, Shang-Chi, Iron Fist, Colleen Wing, and Misty Knight). The Dark Avengers had to make their way through Spider-Man's territory in order to rescue Moonstone and Skaar from Strangetown, which resulted in them running into Spider-Man's gang. After Spider-Man's gang subdues the Dark Avengers while thinking that they are knockoffs of the originals, Ai Apaec speaks with Spider-Man in their spider language, stating that they are good guys. Spider-Man releases them from their webs. The Dark Avengers and Spider-Man's gang arrive in Strangetown, where they fought the All-Seeing Eye and the Soulsnake who are on Doctor Strange's side. After the two creatures are killed, Spider-Man is killed by Tigra as Doctor Strange stated that his two creatures were sacrificed so that Spider-Man can be brought down.

=== Exiles ===
In the series Exiles, which involves inter-dimensional travel, several alternative versions appear:

- The Spider is an alternative version of Spider-Man who merged with the Carnage symbiote and became a psychopathic killer. Before being displaced in time, he had been on death row in his home reality. He originates from Earth-15 and was a member of Weapon X.
- A Spider-Man who is a member of the Fantastic Five and dies in a battle against the Spider.
- A Peter Parker who is part of a mutant superhero team, Force-X, led by Emma Frost. His codename is "Spider". His outfit is the standard Force-X uniform, he wears goggles instead of a mask, and his webbing is organic.
- A version of Peter Parker (from Earth-218) who is a child abused by his Uncle Ben. While locked in the cellar, he is befriended by a large spider-like creature, the Tallus, who instructs Blink and Nocturne to lead this universe's incarnation of Wolverine to the rundown shack the Parkers live in. A fight ensues and the creature and Wolverine are both killed. As Blink and Nocturne depart this reality, it is shown that the creature bit the young Peter.
- Morph fought a Demon Spider-Man on an alternative world. Later, the Demon Spider-Man was viewed briefly by Mojo and Major Domo as it attacked a young couple in a parking complex, but the Demon Spider-Man killed itself.

=== Heroes Reborn (Earth-21798) ===
In the Heroes Reborn event, a change in the timeline results in a continuity in which the Squadron Supreme are Earth's mightiest heroes while the Avengers never came to be. In this continuity, Peter is not bitten by the radioactive spider due to Flash Thompson pushing him out of the way right before it happens. He achieves valedictorian in high school and later attends Empire University, but drops out after Aunt May dies in the crossfire of one of Hyperion's battles. He is hired by Robbie Robertson to take pictures of heroes and act as a friend to Hyperion (in a similar fashion to Jimmy Olsen's relationship with Superman in DC Comics). When Hyperion fails to eliminate Annihilus's hive, Peter successfully manages to evacuate the Bugle and destroy the remaining bug, but is bitten and transforms into a spider-like creature.

=== House of M (Earth-58163) ===
In House of M, a Marvel crossover event, the Scarlet Witch alters reality to make mutants the ruling class over humans. This world is ruled by mutants and their leader, Magneto. In the miniseries Spider-Man: House of M, Peter Parker is believed to be a mutant, and Spider-Man's identity is widely known. He is rich, famous and married to Gwen Stacy, and they have a young son named Ritchie. Aunt May and Uncle Ben are alive and in good health, and J. Jonah Jameson is Peter's often-abused publicist. Unfortunately, his life unravels when Jameson reveals to the world that Spider-Man is not a born mutant. After the world is restored to normal, Peter suffers terribly with the memory of the life he left behind, expressing a desire to kill Magneto, whom he mistakenly believes was behind the events of the House of M, and the Scarlet Witch, whose powers were responsible for the altered reality.

=== The Manga (Earth-70091) ===
Spider-Man: The Manga is a Japanese manga illustrated by Ryoichi Ikegami which retold the story of Spider-Man in a Japanese setting. It was originally published in Japan from January 1970 to September 1971 in Monthly Shōnen Magazine. The main character is named Yu Komori (小森ユウ, Komori Yū) to maintain the Japanese adaptation.

=== Marvel Adventures (Earth-20051) ===
This version of Spider-Man first appeared in Marvel Adventures Spider-Man #53–61 before appearing in the re-titled Spider-Man: Marvel Adventures comic book series. A modern-day high school student, this Spider-Man's origin is similar to his mainstream counterpart, but his supporting cast is significantly different. Although Gwen Stacy exists in this universe, she and Peter are not dating — instead Peter is dating a brand-new character named Sophia "Chat" Sanduval, who is a mutant with the ability to talk to animals. Peter's relationship with Gwen's father, Captain George Stacy, also differs from the original version — here, Captain Stacy discovers Peter's secret identity early on, yet rather than hide this information from Peter (as his mainstream counterpart did), he confides in Peter and becomes Spider-Man's unofficial police contact. While this Spider-Man battles supervillains, he is generally more concerned with combating street-level crime and focuses heavily on taking down the Torinos, a powerful New York City Mafia family.

=== MC2 (Earth-982) ===
An alternative version of Peter Parker also exists on Earth-982 aka the Marvel Comics 2 (MC2) universe, appearing as a supporting character in Spider-Girl.

The title follows almost the entire 616 timeline of the character up until the first attempt at a "relaunch" by the company, 1999, where it deviates and provides an alternative ending to the Final Chapter storyline. Peter's wayward daughter May is revealed to be alive and well, and is returned to both Parkers by Peter's first clone, the redeemed Kaine. Despite now being a father, Peter continues to fight crime as Spider-Man, and begins to cope with the new responsibilities brought by his baby daughter.

Two years later, during his final battle against the Green Goblin, rather than survive unscathed, Peter loses a leg to his arch-enemy and Osborn is killed. Peter finally realizes the price he has paid for being Spider-Man, and ends his career to raise a family with Mary Jane and May. Over the years, he overcomes his physical handicap and ultimately joins the NYPD in a scientific capacity. However, after saving him from an insane Normie Osborn, his daughter May "Mayday" Parker begins a career as Spider-Girl behind his back, a decision Peter begrudgingly is forced to accept and deal with, made difficult by his love for May.

Regardless of his handicap, Peter returned to the role of Spider-Man several times. Once was to aid his daughter and Darkdevil, the son of Ben Reilly, against Kaine, another to convince the latest Spider-Man (the son of Jessica Drew) to cease risking his life, and in Spider-Girl #100 to save May from the Hobgoblin. Peter and MJ ultimately have a second child, Benjamin "Benjy" Parker Jr., who is temporarily rendered deaf after possession by the Carnage symbiote and being blasted with high-frequency sonics. Benjy later develops powers of his own at an infant age. Peter was killed by Daemos, the brother of Morlun, during the "Spider-Verse" event while trying to protect Benjy and Mayday. Near the end of Spider-Geddon, the Other resurrects him, reuniting with Mayday in End of the Spider-Verse and resuming activity as Spider-Man in Spider-Boy (due to the Other restoring his leg).

==== Spider-Girl ====
The Spider-Girl comic book series, originally published under the MC2 imprint, features May "Mayday" Parker, Peter's daughter in an alternative continuity. This timeline diverged from the regular continuity when Peter and Mary Jane's daughter is returned to them by Kaine. In Spider-Girl, Peter has been retired from crime fighting since his final battle with the Green Goblin, which cost him a leg. Peter has settled down to family life and works for the New York City Police Department as a forensic scientist. His teen daughter May follows in his footsteps against his wishes, but Peter eventually helps her train for her calling. Peter appears in costume several times in Spider-Girl, either to restrain and protect May, or to assist her. Peter is among the superheroes kidnapped by Loki in the spin-off series Last Hero Standing.

In the Spider-Girl storyline "Brand New May", Peter has uncovered a lab, within it is a stasis tank containing a symbiote duplicate of Mayday Parker, with notes left behind by Norman Osborn suggesting she is the real Mayday, and not a clone. When protecting his nephew Normie from an exploding test tube, Peter is affected by the serum within much like Osborn was and begins to develop erratic behavior. He ultimately overcomes an attempt by Norman Osborn to control his mind and defeats him with the aid of his daughter, her clone, and the spirit of his Aunt May.

==== Spider-Man (Gerry Drew) ====
Spider-Man

Publication information
- Publisher: Marvel Comics
- First appearance: Spider-Girl #32 (May 2001)
- Created by: Tom DeFalco; Ron Frenz

In-story information
- Alter ego: Gerald "Gerry" Drew
- Abilities: Spider-like superhuman strength, speed and agility, wall-crawling, can fire organic webs from wrists

In the same MC2 continuity as Spider-Girl, Gerald "Gerry" Drew, the son of Jessica Drew, inherits spider-powers and poses as Spider-Man. Created by Tom DeFalco and Ron Frenz, he first appeared in Spider-Girl #32 (May 2001), and is a supporting character in Spider-Girl.

Within the context of the stories, Jessica Drew, the original Spider-Woman, had retired from superheroics and gotten married. She gives birth to a baby boy, Gerry, who was diagnosed with a strange blood-borne disorder due to radiation exposure in the womb. With doctors and medicines unable to help her son, Jessica recreates the experiment that cured her of her radiation poisoning, the experiment that made her Spider-Woman. The experiment imbues Gerry with spider-powers, but did not cure him. Gerry's illness strains his parents' marriage and leads to their divorce. Feeling responsible for the break-up, Gerry becomes withdrawn. Jessica tries to alleviate his pain by telling him stories from her past, his favorites involving Spider-Man.

Determined to make his short time on Earth count, Gerry designs his own Spider-Man costume and equipment based from his idol's, and convinces his mother to train him in how to use his powers. Calling himself Spider-Man, he meets Spider-Girl, and the two initially clash. During a fight between several villains, a bullet intended for Spider-Man kills one of the villains when Spider-Girl shoves him out of its way. Upset that he was responsible for a death, Gerry runs into Darkdevil, who trains him to be a more effective crime-fighter. At the request of Peter Parker, the original Spider-Man, Gerry decides to retire from superheroic adventuring, while Reed Richards searches for a cure for his blood disease.

=== Spider-Monkey (Earth-8101) ===
A spider monkey-themed Spider-Man appears in Marvel Apes. The character was later killed by Jennix in the "Spider-Verse" event.

=== Marvel Nemesis: Rise of the Imperfects (Earth-50701) ===
In the Marvel Nemesis: Rise of the Imperfects series, set on Earth-50701, Spider-Man was abducted by alien scientist Niles Van Roekel. The Thing, Wolverine, Elektra, the Human Torch, and Storm are also abducted and injected with a drug in an attempt to corrupt them. Once infected, Spider-Man's costume becomes brown-and-bronze with a blue spider mark on his chest. Spider-Man and the other heroes are eventually able to fight off the corrupting infection and defeat Van Roekel. In the aftermath of the invasion, Paragon and the Imperfects join to share the Earth with the heroes.

=== Marvel Zombies Spider-Man (Earth-2149) ===
A zombified Spider-Man from Marvel Zombies #1 (December 2005), a cover homage to the original version's first appearance in Amazing Fantasy #15 (Aug. 1962), art by Arthur Suydam

The Marvel Zombies universe features a Spider-Man who has been turned into a flesh-eating zombie after being infected by Colonel America (alternative reality of Zombified Captain America). Although Spider-Man is just as ravenous as the other zombies when hungry, when he has eaten, Spider-Man is racked with guilt at what he has done, especially for having eaten Mary Jane and Aunt May, but unable to change his nature. At the conclusion of the original series, Spider-Man is one of the heroes who become the Galacti, having consumed the original Galactus and subsequently acquiring his cosmic powers.

In Marvel Zombies 2, he notices that his hunger is starting to fade and, as a result, is the first of the Galacti to turn against his fellow zombies. Eventually with the aid of Forge, Malcom, and the Acolytes, the zombies retaining their hunger are defeated. Spider-Man is one of the zombies that remain and continues work to rebuild New Wakanda and bury the dead.

In Marvel Zombies Return, Spider-Man is teleported to a new world, where he consumes and infects the Sinister Six (except for the Sandman). As his cosmic abilities did not come with him, and his web-shooters have dried up, the zombified superhero is forced to make do with his own veins and arteries. Following the death of the Spider-Man of this universe (killed by the Sandman in revenge for the deaths of the other members of this universe's Sinister Six) the zombie Spider-Man works on developing a cure for the plague with the aid of the Kitty Pryde of this universe, using nanites and the blood of this world's Wolverine. With the zombie Giant-Man having followed Spider-Man to this new reality, Spider-Man resolves to stop Giant-Man. Spider-Man releases Sandman, now infused with nanites, who wipes out every zombie hero and villain with the exception of an infected Sentry who was teleported to Earth 2149. Zombie Spider-Man himself became exposed to the nanite-infused Sandman and dies as a result.

=== Mutant X (Earth-1298) ===
The Mutant X version of Spider-Man diverges from his mainstream counterpart in Amazing Spider-Man #102, in that he was unable or unwilling to cure himself of having six arms. For unexplained reasons, he reverses his name to the Man-Spider. A third divergence occurs when he and his clone continue to co-exist after the end of the original Clone Saga. The two keep this a secret by taking care to never appear in public at the same time, but the Man-Spider is forced to admit the truth after his clone is killed by Madelyne Pryor. He himself is later killed.

=== Newspaper strip (Earth-77013) ===
The Peter Parker of the daily Spider-Man newspaper strip continues his career as a struggling photographer constantly facing down the abuse of his less-than-satisfied boss J. Jonah Jameson, whilst battling crime in his disguise as Spider-Man. In addition to opposing classic enemies, much of the strip sees Peter battle new enemies. He has also teamed up with various heroes through the strip's run, such as Daredevil and Wolverine. He is married to Mary Jane in this continuity, and has often been aided by her in his battles with his enemies. This universe was visited by Morlun during the "Spider-Verse" event, but due to time distortions constantly resetting things so that the simplest actions take weeks to progress, Morlun finds his efforts to consume this version of Peter fruitless. The Master Weaver of the Inheritors elects to rebel against his masters for once and seals this universe in a pocket dimension, where it will remain safe from further attacks.

=== Powerless (Earth-40081) ===
Marvel published a miniseries called Powerless in 2004, which describes a Marvel Universe without superpowers. In this series, Peter Parker appears as a young man nicknamed Spider-Man on the Internet. This version had also been bitten by a radioactive spider, but instead of gaining spider-powers, his hand became atrophic. In this continuity, Peter is in love with Gwen Stacy; Mary Jane is not featured.

=== Ruins Spider-Man (Earth-9591) ===
Warren Ellis' parody of Kurt Busiek's Marvels, Ruins, was a two-part miniseries set in an alternative universe where the situations that led to the heroes of the Marvel Universe gaining superpowers led to horrific deformities and deaths instead. In this world, when Parker was bitten by a radioactive spider, instead of gaining spider-powers, he broke out into an infectious rash that covered his body before his painful death. He had visited the offices of the Daily Bugle beforehand and infected fellow photographer Phil Sheldon, who set off to figure out how his world took a wrong turn, but succumbed to the disease before he could write his book.

=== Spectacular Spider-Man Adventures (Earth-9411) ===
The United Kingdom-based Panini Comics publication Spectacular Spider-Man Adventures was loosely based on the continuity of the 1994 animated TV series. In this series, Peter Parker deals with the day-to-day headaches of balancing a social life with his superheroics. He has a close circle of friends such as Liz Allen, Harry Osborn, and Flash Thompson, and he is involved in a relationship with Mary Jane. However, in this continuity, Mary Jane does not possess an existing knowledge of his dual identity, and thus Peter finds juggling his life with her and his crime-fighting career difficult. Despite this, Mary Jane loyally supports Peter, believing it is his dangerous job as a photographer that keeps him away from dates and other activities. A look into the future (based on MC2) reveals Peter and MJ ultimately get married in this continuity and have a daughter, May, who is active as Spider-Girl. At some point in this future, Peter loses his leg, which forces him to retire as Spider-Man.

=== Spider-Bitch (Earth-807128/21923) ===
In the Old Man Logan universe, the granddaughter of Peter Parker and daughter of Clint Barton and Tonya Parker, the supervillain known as Spider-Bitch was born as simply Ashley (later referred to in overview text, though never in dialogue, as Ashley Barton), lacking spider-powers yet using her intuition and combat training to conquer a portion of the Wastelands as the new Kingpin.

=== Spider-Boy (Earth-9602) ===
In the Amalgam Comics universe, Spider-Man was combined with DC's Superboy to create Spider-Boy. He is featured in Spider-Boy #1 (April 1996) and Spider-Boy Team-Up #1 (June 1997). In this continuity, Spider-Boy is a clone of researcher Peter Parker created at Project Cadmus. Adopted by Cadmus director Thunderbolt Ross, he is given the name "Pete Ross". Spider-Boy is able to redirect his own personal gravity, giving him the ability to climb walls and increase his strength. He is able to shoot webs using a special "web gun" developed by Cadmus. Spider-Boy is an honorary member of the Legion of Galactic Guardians 2099 (an amalgamation of DC's Legion of Super-Heroes, Marvel's Guardians of the Galaxy, and the Marvel 2099 timeline).

=== Spider-Hulk (Earth-70105) ===
In Bullet Points, Peter Parker is the Hulk and Bruce Banner is Spider-Man. Peter is killed by Galactus.

=== 1602 Spider-Man (Earth-311) ===
Peter Parquagh is a counterpart to Peter in the miniseries Marvel 1602, albeit without spider-powers. In the series he acts as an apprentice to the royal spymaster Sir Nicholas Fury. A running gag involves Peter repeatedly almost getting bitten by unusual spiders, something that finally occurs at the very end. In the sequel miniseries, 1602: New World, he takes the identity of the Spider. Later, Peter's dual identity is revealed, and with the death of his beloved Virginia Dare at the hands of Norman Osborne, he returns to Europe and falls in love with Marion Jane Watson and joins her family of theater performers. During a battle with Baron Octavius, Norman Osborn, and Curtis Connors in Venice, a bystander picks up some of Peter's webbing, which eventually served as the basis for the Super Soldier Serum and created Captain America in World War II in this universe.

Spider-Man 1602 appears in Spider-Man: Shattered Dimensions as an alternative costume for Spider-Man Noir, and in Edge of Time as a costume for Miguel O'Hara.

=== Spider-Man 2099 (Earth-928) ===
Miguel O'Hara is a geneticist from the year 2099 who gained spider-powers from a gene splicing incident, when the company he was about to quit injected him with a dangerous drug called Rapture. He tried to rid himself of the drug by using the gene splicer he helped to invent but, unbeknownst to him, a jealous co-worker had set it to repeat the previous experiment of a spider. The last time they had tried this experiment, it killed the test subject (the main reason Miguel quit), but this time it worked. Instead of becoming a company-owned version of Spider-Man he became the opposite, a Spider-Man who fights Alchemax and other large corporations ruling the world in the future. As Spider-Man, Miguel possesses much of the same abilities as the original version of the character, although he notably lacks a spider-sense and has sharp talons on his fingers, which allow him to inject his enemies with a paralyzing venom.

=== Spider-Man 2211 (Earth-9500) ===
Spider-Man 2211

Publication information
- Created by: Peter David; Rick Leonardi

In-story information
- Alter ego: Dr. Max Borne

Spider-Man (Max Borne), also known as Spider-Man 2211, is a superhero who appears in comics published by Marvel Comics. Created by Peter David and Rick Leonardi, he first appeared in Spider-Man 2099 Meets Spider-Man (Nov. 1995). Within the context of the stories, Dr. Max Borne is from the year 2211, the Spider-Man of that year. In his first appearance he aids two other Spider-Men, Peter Parker and Miguel O'Hara, in defeating the Hobgoblin 2211, his main enemy. This version of the Hobgoblin is Robin Borne, his daughter, driven insane when she was infected by a nanovirus. Spider-Man 2211 is later shot and killed by the Chameleon posing as Uncle Ben.

In other media

Spider-Man 2211 appears in Spider-Man: Across the Spider-Verse, voiced by Humberto Ramos.

=== Spider-Man: Chapter One (Earth-98121) ===
The miniseries Spider-Man: Chapter One was John Byrne's attempt to re-imagine Spider-Man's early years (similar to the revamp given to Superman), giving him a new but similar origin. The series is no longer considered canon within the Earth-616 universe, but is instead set in its own alternate universe.

=== Spider-Man Fairy Tales ===
- Kwuka Anansi (Earth-7082), a playful trickster god based on the West African mythological figure of the same name. He is also featured in the "Spider-Verse" event.
- Izumi (Earth-7930), a Japanese boy who is bitten by a Tsuchigumo version of Venom and transforms into Spider-Man.
- The Prince of Aracne (Earth-71004), a knight version of Peter Parker in an altered retelling of Cinderella. He is killed by Solus in the "Spider-Verse" event.

=== Spider-Man: Fake Red ===
In Spider-Man: Fake Red, Spider-Man's suit is found by Yu Onomae, who begins to wear it after Peter Paker threw it away while overtaken by Venom, unwittingly making it so that the hero's absence is unnoticed by the city, as Cindy Moon looks for him. Ultimately Yu faces Venom alone, freeing Peter from the symbiote and allowing him to return as Spider-Man.

=== Spider-Man J (Earth-7041) ===
This is one of many manga-related Spider-Man series. The character later crossed over into the "Spider-Verse" event with the Marvel Mangaverse version and The Manga version.

=== Spider-Man Noir (Earth-90214) ===
This version of Spider-Man appeared in a four-issue miniseries (February–May 2009) set in the Great Depression era of New York in the 1930s. In this universe, Aunt May is a speaker for equality and spends time standing on a soap box shouting out her beliefs. Uncle Ben is killed by a crime syndicate run by Norman Osborn, a.k.a. the Goblin. Shortly afterwards, Peter is bitten by a strange spider and endowed with mystical spider-powers. He has a wall-crawling ability, increased agility, strength, and a form of spider-sense, and can spray nets of webbing from his hand. He dons a black mask, gloves, and a trench coat, and sets out to stop Norman and his gang.

Other interpretations of this version of Spider-Man appear in the video game Spider-Man: Shattered Dimensions, the Ultimate Spider-Man animated series, and the animated film Spider-Man: Into the Spider-Verse and its sequel, Across the Spider-Verse.

=== Spider-Man: Last Stand (Earth-312500) ===
In issue #500 of The Amazing Spider-Man, Julia Carpenter, now possessing Madame Web's powers, shows what would happen if Spider-Man were to have proceeded in killing Kraven the Hunter. In the vision, Peter is kicked out of the Avengers for his killing of the Kravinoffs. He develops a much colder and harsher personality and attacks Harry Osborn. He then appears in a new red leather costume and starts killing all of the supervillains, beginning with Doctor Octopus, and reveals his identity to his Aunt May, who is shocked and in tears.

=== Spider-Man: Life Story (Earth-19529) ===
The 2019 six-issue miniseries Spider-Man: Life Story, written by Steve Murray and Chip Zdarsky, features a version of Peter Parker/Spider-Man that began his superhero career in his debut date of 1962 and ages in real time, witnessing key events such as the Vietnam War (which lasted longer in this reality), the Russian War (a fictional World War III-esque conflict between the United States and the Soviet Union) and 9/11, as well as marrying Mary Jane Watson and this reality's versions of Secret Wars, Kraven's Last Hunt, The Clone Saga and Civil War. By the final issue, Spider-Man sacrifices himself to stop Doctor Doom.

=== Spider-Man: Reign (Earth-70237) ===
Spider-Man: Reign depicts an older Spider-Man in the future who, having given up on crime-fighting, is driven back into action by the return of some of his old enemies, exposing a conspiracy by Venom to take control of the city with a mass of symbiotes. The character is later killed by Daemos with his head smashed on Mary Jane Watson's tombstone in the "Spider-Verse" event, before being revived in End of the Spider-Verse, leading into Spider-Man: Reign 2.

=== Spider-Man Unlimited ===
This version of Spider-Man, after being blamed by J. Jonah Jameson for his son's disappearance exploring another planet named Counter-Earth, designs a new costume with sonic weaponry and stealth capabilities using nanotechnology borrowed from Reed Richards. Traveling to Counter-Earth himself, he joins a group of human revolutionaries led by John Jameson himself in resisting the High Evolutionary and his tyrannical rule, in which humans are brutally oppressed and the half-human, half-animal Beastials form the social elite. He also battles Venom and Carnage, who traveled with Jameson to Counter-Earth and are plotting to infect the entire planet with symbiotes. This version later appeared in Spider-Man: Across the Spider-Verse.

=== Spidey-Man (Earth-665) ===
This is a satirical version of the mainstream Spider-Man in Not Brand Echh.

=== Ultimate Marvel (Earth-1610) ===
==== Ultimate Peter Parker ====
Ultimate Spider-Man is a modernized reboot of the Spider-Man story, starting from the very beginning, with a plot that is inspired by, but very different from, the original 616 continuity and thus is a parallel universe counterpart to the mainstream version of Spider-Man. The main purpose of the series is to be accessible to new and young readers, as it is free from the decades of history of the original, but it has been embraced by many longtime fans as well.

==== The Spider ====
In the ongoing series Ultimate Comics: Avengers, a second Spider-Man was shown to be one of its members, and is simply referred to as the Spider. His costume bears an orange-and-purple color as opposed to red-and-blue. The Spider once claimed that he was a clone made from the DNA of Spider-Man and Professor X that was sent from the future.

The Spider was seen as a member of the Avengers that was established by Nick Fury and Gregory Stark. Where he resided was kept under surveillance indicating that he might have been a criminal in his early life. Spider was said to be crazy where he caused a technician to commit suicide, but is shown to be intelligent as he enjoyed reading books. Gregory Stark referred to Spider as an "It" due to what his true nature would be.

Spider accompanied the Avengers in a manhunt for Ghost Rider where he was targeting then-Vice President of the United States Robert Blackthorn.

In the "Death of Spider-Man" story arc in Avengers vs. New Ultimates, the Spider is revealed to be of an unidentified North Asian culture and acting under the orders of Gregory Stark who ordered him to lead a superhuman uprising in North Korea. The New Ultimates and the Hulk Drug-empowered Avengers arrived to quell the uprising. During the uprising, the Spider is killed by Hawkeye after the Avengers and the New Ultimates intervene.

==== Miles Morales ====
After Peter Parker's apparent death in Ultimate Comics Spider-Man #160, a new character by the name of Miles Morales takes up the mantle of Spider-Man as a 13-year-old superhero.

The character of Miles Morales has been adapted into other forms of media, including the Spider-Verse films, where he is the main character.

=== Ultimate Universe (Earth-6160) ===
The protagonist of Ultimate Spider-Man (2024) is a version of the character who exists in the new Ultimate Universe created in the aftermath of Ultimate Invasion. Due to interference from the Maker, Peter is never bitten by the radioactive spider. He is married to Mary Jane Watson, with whom he has two children, Richard Parker (named after his father) and May Parker (named after his aunt). Peter works as a reporter for the Manhattan tabloid Daily Bugle, working under Ben and J. Jonah Jameson. However, Peter grows up with the nagging feeling that there is something wrong with his life, and yearns for a way to change it. When Tony Stark sets out to rectify the Maker's influence, the Maker's Council hijacks a Stark Industries laser and fires it at Manhattan. This causes mass destruction and kills Aunt May, with the council pinning the blame on Stark.

Peter learns from Tony Stark that he was meant to be a superhero, one of many that the Maker prevented from existing in his bid to rule the world. Invigorated by this sense of purpose, Peter accepts Stark's gift and allows himself to be bitten by the radioactive spider. Peter serves as Spider-Man for a year alongside fellow superhero Harry Osborn / Green Goblin before being kidnapped by Kraven the Hunter and held captive for months, over which time Peter's 15-year-old son Richard Parker becomes a new Spider-Man, operating his father's pitotech suit (run by an A.I. Peter, Pico Parker) and bonding with the 16-year-old Felicia Hardy.

The Earth-6160 Peter Parker was created by writer Jonathan Hickman and Bryan Hitch, and first appeared in Ultimate Invasion #1 (June 2023), Hickman stating that the character was inspired by Peter Parker from the Spider-Verse film series, while Richard Parker II was created by Hickman and Marco Checchetto, first appearing in Ultimate Spider-Man #1 (January 2024) and becoming the second Earth-6160 Spider-Man in Ultimate Spider-Man #13 (January 2025).

=== The Webslinger ===
On the sword and sorcery alternate Earth called Eurth, the Webslinger is an alternate version of Spider-Man that helps Captain Avalon rescue his son from the Dreadlord.

=== What If? ===
Several alternative versions of Spider-Man appear in several issues of What If..?.

- The first issue of the series retells the events of The Amazing Spider-Man #1 in which this time Spider-Man joins the Fantastic Four; this universe is revisited in several different issues of What If..?
- What if Spider-Man Had Kept His Six Arms? explores what would have happened if Morbius the Living Vampire had been eaten by sharks and thus never made it to Connors' laboratory with a cure. Ultimately the arm mutation is irreversible, but it proves an advantage and Spider-Man defeats most of his villains easily. Spider-Man even becomes a spokesman for the physically challenged, and inspires all to rise to their true potential.
- What if someone else besides Spider-Man had been bitten by the radioactive spider? explores what would have happened if either Flash Thompson, Betty Brant or John Jameson were bitten by the radioactive spider. All three prove to be failures as the 'new' Spider-Man. Each story ends with Peter extracting the residual radioactive venom from the dead spider and using it to create a serum to give himself powers, thus becoming Spider-Man anyway.
- What if Spider-Man had never become a crimefighter? explores a world where Spider-Man stopped the burglar from robbing the TV studio and continued his TV career, becoming a public relations 'specialist' for superheroes until Jameson's angry attack on him when slacking off with his powers nearly results in Daredevil's death, inspiring Spider-Man to become a real hero.
- What if the alien costume had possessed Spider-Man? sees Spider-Man being killed when he fails to go to Reed Richards for help in time to remove the symbiote, which goes on to drain the Hulk's powers and possess Thor until it is driven away by Black Bolt and killed by Black Cat.
- In another issue named What if Captain America Were Not Revived Until Today?, Spider-Man joins an underground rebellion to fight an America turned fascist, aids the real Captain America in defeating the instigator behind this movement, and leading the chastised nation back to its democratic roots.
- In What if Spider-Man became a murderer?, an enraged Peter accidentally kills the burglar, leading him to become conflicted and avoid being Spider-Man. After he helps cure Curt Connors from his Lizard transformation, Curt inspires Peter to come clean and serve a prison sentence for his actions. He is released early for good behavior and May encourages him to become Spider-Man once more.
- What if Peter Parker had to destroy Spider-Man? displays another continuity in which Flash is bitten by the spider and uses his powers to become a criminal. Peter develops mechanical spider legs with the help of Otto Octavius and uses his scientific knowledge to defeat Flash. Reed Richards depowers Flash, but does not transfer the spider's powers to Peter as he believes Peter's proven enough to be a hero without superpowers.
- What if? The Other, set during "The Other" storyline, features an alternative version of Peter who abandons the Spider when given the choice. Some time afterward, the Venom symbiote leaves its current host (Mac Gargan) and merges with Peter to become Poison. When MJ refuses Poison's offer to bond to the symbiote's spawn, it instead bonds to Gwen's corpse and reanimates her as Carnage.
- Two "What if?" stories feature Aunt May dying instead of Uncle Ben, both of which end with Ben assisting Peter in his crime-fighting activities.
- Another issue portrays a Peter Parker whom the radioactive spider bite mutated into a spider-like creature, as well as making his son a mutant.
- In What If... Set Had Come to Earth? features a version of Spider-Man who had been turned into one of Set's Serpent Men. He was later killed.
- In a "What if?" Age of Apocalypse reality in which both Charles Xavier and Eric Lensherr were killed, Apocalypse is served by clones of a symbiote Spider-Man, although the clones seem to be more symbiote than man.
- In What If? Spider-Man vs. Wolverine, Spider-Man remains in Russia with Wolverine after their rescue mission to protect Charlemagne's sister, Alex (who resembles Gwen), and eventually becomes a black-ops agent. Through training alongside Wolverine, he enhances his spider-sense, becomes more confident and willing to kill. He eventually decides to join up with Wolverine permanently and leave behind his old ways. He also develops a change to his web-shooters which enables him to shoot bullets and his costume to a sleeker black and red suit more fit for his new lifestyle. This Spider-Man appears in the "Spider-Verse" event as the "Assassin Spider-Man".
- In What If? Flash Thompson became Spider-Man, another version of Flash who became Spider-Man appears and is both a ruthless hero and still a bully to Peter who takes photos of Spider-Man. When Peter finds out Flash's identity, he asks him to help save his aunt by retrieving some isotopes Doctor Octopus stole, but an enraged Flash accidentally beats him to death. Flash, wanting redemption, fights Octavius but he gets trapped. While trying to lift the rubble, he realizes that he is a murderer and, after freeing himself, gets the isotopes to save May and willingly surrenders to the police.
- In What If? Spider-Man became the Punisher, Peter wears a black costume with a skull on it and converts his web shooters to fire bullets. Despite killing criminals, his life is similar to his 616 counterpart. When the Green Goblin kidnaps Gwen Stacy, Peter kills Norman and succeeds in saving Gwen. Peter decided to abandon the "Spider-Punisher" costume and live a normal life, then a wounded Frank Castle, who saw his family die to mobsters, finds the Spider-Punisher suit. After marrying Gwen, he is later bonded to the Venom symbiote, but after discovering its violent nature, he manages to discard and contain it with the help of Gwen, who is now pregnant with their child.
- In What If...? Secret Wars, Peter is brought to the Ultimate universe following his world's destruction (in contrast to the book's original ending where Miles is brought to Earth-616). After donning the Scarlet Spider identity and working at S.H.I.E.L.D. for months, he begins dying of radiation poisoning as nuclear physics operate differently than in his world. Miles and other allies of Ultimate Peter attempt to save him by bringing him to the portal guarded by the Future Foundation. When Peter enters, he finds the Maker has gained the Beyonder's powers and is unable to restore his world. With weeks left before he dies and a dwindling metahuman population, Peter begins a movement with the world's remaining heroes to ensure its survival.
- In What If?... Jessica Jones Was Bitten by the Radioactive Spider, a teenage Jessica Jones is bitten by the radioactive spider instead of Peter. She becomes the superhero and fashion icon Spider-Girl for attention while Peter became a journalist documenting her battles. She also developed different abilities such as organic webbing (which she primarily uses to form parachutes instead of swinging) and acid breath. When the Green Goblin murders her family, she exposes him as Norman Osborn, leading him to commit suicide and her to retire. Years later, she becomes a bartender for Luke Cage, but finds the Goblin has returned and has started killing mob bosses. She tracks him down and discovers he is Peter, who wanted Jessica to become a hero again to save his dwindling career. Feeling reinvigorated, she forms a partnership with beat cop Misty Knight.

=== Secret Wars ===
In Secret Wars (2015), a number of alternate versions of Spider-Man appear in the domains of Battleworld.

- In the Armor Wars reality, Peter Urich is a nephew of Ben Urich who became Spyder-Man after being infected with the "spider virus". He was dating Kiri Oshiro, the daughter of Rumiko Fujikawa. Spyder-Man was killed by Technopolis' baron Iron Man after he discovered vital information about the disease that forced everyone in Technopolis to wear armor.
- In an alternate Civil War reality where the conflict continued after the anti-registration side's attempt to escape the Negative Zone prison triggered a self-destruct sequence that destroyed most of New York, Peter continued serving on Captain America's side in the conflict and was given new upgrades such as wings that bear a resemblance to the Falcon; with Rogers noting that Peter is now his fastest operative. Since Mary–Jane and his daughter Maybelle live on Iron Man's terrain due to them not getting the chance to evacuate, he hardly gets the chance to see them. Following Steve's death in the final battle, Peter becomes the leader of Steve's side called "the Blue" and collaborates with Jennifer Walters, the new leader of "the Iron".
- In an alternate version of Spider-Island, Spider-Man was supposedly killed by the spider-infected Avengers, which inspired Agent Venom to lead the resistance. However, he is discovered to be still alive and being held captive in the Spider Queen's facility. He aids Flash in stopping the Spider Queen and becomes the Baron of Spider-Island after she is defeated; though at the cost of Flash's life.
- A story titled Amazing Spider-Man: Renew Your Vows sees Spider-Man and Mary Jane married with a daughter named Annie (who is developing spider-powers of her own). After being glimpsed in the "Spider-Verse" event, Peter saves his family from Venom while most of the heroes die by Regent's hands. He retires as Spider-Man to avoid detection from Regent and to focus on raising his family. However, he is later forced to don the mask again to stop Regent and protect his family. The second volume of the series details the later adventures of Spider-Man and his family.
- A reality is seen depicting Spider-Man sacrificing himself to save the Prowler, who went on to continue the web-slinger's legacy as Spider-Hero.

=== No More (Earth-51838) ===
In No More — a story arc starting in Peter Parker: The Spectacular Spider-Man #303 – a trip to the past to retrieve vital information resulted in Peter Parker changing his past when his younger self decided to abandon being Spider-Man because he felt, based on what he had seen and overheard of his future self's life, that such a career would only bring him pain and suffering. As a result, Peter Parker became a successful industrialist married to Gwen Stacy, but Norman Osborn has conquered the world, killing Iron Man and most of the Fantastic Four and imprisoning Doctor Doom, with Peter still hiding behind his corporate role even as Gwen discreetly aids the resistance as he believes that taking action as Spider-Man will only make things worse.

=== The "Perfect" World (Earth-11638) ===
This version of Spider-Man is called the Amazing Spider, who is rich, powerful enough to fight Galactus, and universally popular. None of his loved ones have died, with Uncle Ben surviving the fateful mugging. Peter runs Parker Technologies and Uncle Ben spurs him to be the best. Upon inventing a portal technology, he brought Earth-616's Spider-Man (unknowingly bringing both Deadpool and the Hulk along as well) to Earth-11638. It transpires that the Amazing Spider has been pulling Spider-Men from alternate universes through into his universe and then fatally draining their powers, as Uncle Ben has trained him to believe "with great power comes great responsibility to stay powerful". During the confrontation with Spider-Man in the Amazing Spider's lair, Uncle Ben was about to plug Spider-Man into the machine, but the Amazing Spider, realising what he has done, jumps in the way and was placed in a comatose state. While in a coma, the Amazing Spider's soul arrived in Hell, where Bruce Banner's Sorcerer Supreme counterpart died fighting the Infernal Hulk. Fully acknowledging he deserved to be in hell, he was helped by Bruce's astral form to return with the souls of the repentant damned, which gave him a second chance to live. When he awoke, he found himself transformed into a new character called the Ghost Spider. To make amends with Spider-Man, the Ghost Spider transported him, Deadpool, and the Hulk back to Earth-616.

In the 2018 Marvel's Spider-Man video game, Ghost Spider appears as an alternate costume, named Spirit Spider to avoid confusion with Earth-65's Gwen Stacy.

=== Marvel vs. Capcom (Earth-30847) ===
Not much of this version of Spider-Man is different from traditional iterations, except for the fact that the universe is shared by Capcom characters. This universe does not have a concrete lore, but the main plot of Marvel vs. Capcom does feature Spider-Man contributing in the battle against Ultron Sigma, a fusion of Ultron and Sigma from the Mega Man X series.

=== Marvel Two-in-One ===
When traveling through the multiverse, the Thing and the Human Torch get stranded in a universe with an apocalyptic Earth. This Earth is ruled by an evil version of Spider-Man who is wearing Captain America's mask.

=== Marvel: NOW WHAT! (Earth-231013) ===
In this universe, Spider-Storm (an amalgamation of Spider-Man and X-Men member Storm) appears as a member of the X-Vengers.

=== Infinity Warps ===
Peter Parker (with Moon Knight's story with elements of Spider-Man's life) was attacked by the Goblin by Night, who killed his Uncle Ben and Aunt May. Near death, he is revived from the Master Weaver by a spider to be his avatar and is given spider-powers, but splitting his personality into four. With his newfound powers, he fights crime under the name of the ArachKnight and is CEO of his company, along with Harry Russell and Marley Jane. He soon learns the truth from Harry that Norman had been cursed into a Goblin and killed both Ben and May against his will. When the Goblin curse took control of Norman's body the final time and passes the curse into Harry against his will, ArachKnight forgives a now cured Norman and welcomes him to join Parker Industries to help find a cure for Harry.

=== Venomverse (Earth-17952) ===
In the Venomverse event, an alternate version of Spider-Man who reunited with the symbiote after leaving Eddie Brock is recruited with the other Venoms to fight the Poisons. He is later tricked by a Poison into thinking it was Aunt May before it consumed him and became an enemy to Venom. He was later blown up with the other Poisons by a bomb created by a Venomized Rocket Raccoon.

Hasbro released an action figure of Poison in the Marvel Legends line.

=== Punisher vs. the Marvel Universe (Earth-11080) ===
After being the first to be infected by a virus that turned people into cannibals, Spider-Man ate the Rhino and took control of a piece of New York alongside the Black Widow, Deadpool, and Scorpio. After becoming Patient Zero, he hires Frank Castle to rescue a pregnant Mary Jane from the Kingpin's group. While Castle rescued Mary Jane and a group of surviving humans, he shot and killed the infected Spider-Man immediately after.

=== Spider-Man/Deadpool (Earth-18236) ===
In an alternate future, Spider-Man is an old man who got paralyzed from a Life Model Decoy Deadpool and lives in a retirement home with an elderly Wade Wilson. Unknown to Spider-Man, Oldpool was giving his blood to Peter so he would not die. In a battle between LMD Deadpools, Oldpool uses Doctor Doom's time machine and mistakenly switches places with the mainstream Deadpool. After they get to the main timeline, they are reunited with the mainstream Spider-Man and Oldpool, then, after stopping the Master Matrix (the LMD master created from Peter's parents) and the Chameleon, Old Man Peter and Oldpool fade away and go back to their timeline.

=== Squadron Supreme (Earth-31916) ===
In the Squadron Supreme series, Nell Ruggles (a.k.a. Arachnophilia) was a young troubled girl who, upon gaining her spider-powers, killed her classmates, who had bullied her in the past. However, her superhuman powers allowed her to be traced back to a device which the Icarus One astronauts brought back from the Moon. Running away from home, she was captured by the Blur and turned over to Nick Fury's S.H.I.E.L.D. Thanks to an electroshock collar, she has been prevented from leaving, although she appears to be making the best of the situation, having made friends and eventually falling in love with Tucker Ford, the Biogeneral.

=== Spider-Man: Bloodlines (Earth-29320) ===
In the comic book series written by filmmaker J. J. Abrams and his son Henry, Peter Parker has retired his Spider-Man persona for twelve years following a battle with the monster Cadaverous who seemingly killed his wife Mary Jane Watson and mauled his right arm, forcing him to use a hook there instead. As a result, he is always away at work as a war photographer for the Daily Bugle per his own request to deal with his trauma and has a strained relationship with his son, Benjamin "Benny" Parker, who had inherited his father's powers and abilities and resents him for leaving him and Aunt May while also feeling like a monster. After Benny gets detention again for inadvertently using his powers to help save a fellow student from a bully, Peter reprimands him by telling him that it is not always good to try and help and that he should stay away because of his powers, only for his son to rebuke him. After Benny burns his father's original costume, he is soon convinced by his classmate and fellow detention student, Faye Ito a.k.a Marker to join her for a night out, and Aunt May gives him a spare costume. After Ben saves some lives, he catches his father's attention and the latter again rebukes him for trying to be a hero, despite May's own attempts to reprimand her nephew for not being a father to his son. After Peter is captured by Cadaverous who wants his DNA to resurrect his dead wife. Benny, regretting the way he treated his father teams up with Marker, Riri Williams and an aging Tony Stark, who lost his teammates, the Avengers to Cadaverous to help save his father. MJ is eventually revealed to be alive disguised as Cadaverous' minion and helps save Peter. Peter eventually sacrifices himself to save MJ and Benny and a funeral is held for him following which Tony Stark gives MJ and Benny, new Spider-Man based costumes via Aunt May.

=== Spider-Man: Spider's Shadow ===
This five-part series offers an alternate take on what would happen if Peter chose to keep the symbiote costume rather than reject it after Reed Richards revealed it was alive. Spider-Man starts acting more aggressive, even unmasking and threatening Hobgoblin (Roderick Kingsley) during an altercation. This leads Kingsley to track him down to May's house, where he blows it up and kills May in the process. Enraged, Peter brutally murders Hobgoblin and decides to take justice into his own hands by killing any criminals that come in his way. After Spider-Man seemingly kills the Kingpin, the Sinister Six (consisting of Kraven, Electro, Rhino, Mysterio, Eddie Brock possessing Doctor Octopus' arms and a reluctant J. Jonah Jameson) assemble in the countryside to take him down. Though Spider-Man kills Electro, Rhino, and Mysterio, Kraven and Jameson separate Peter from the symbiote after discovering its weakness to fire.

Jameson takes Peter home and to meet up with Mary Jane and Black Cat, where they find out that Kingpin had leaked Spider-Man's secret identity to the press. As Felicia takes Jameson to safety, Peter and Mary Jane discover that the symbiote has possessed Reed and taken over the Baxter Building, where it has used his scientific knowledge to make itself stronger and take control of anyone inside, including the Thing. Knowing the suit still wants him, Peter ventures into the building with Mary Jane and the Human Torch, where they find out that the symbiote used Reed to create other symbiotes to possess the other heroes present near the building. It then orders them to attack Mary Jane, as Peter's love for her is what prevented it from taking over him completely. Spider-Man and the Torch then lure the symbiote back to the Baxter Building, where Peter offers himself to the symbiote willingly. After the symbiote kills Reed, it attempts to bond to Peter again, however it's revealed that "Peter" was actually a disguised Torch using Reed's image inducer that the real Peter gave him, allowing him to annihilate the symbiote with his flames. Peter turned himself in for the murders, but was ultimately declared not guilty since the other heroes who were possessed by symbiotes testified on his behalf. Susan Storm invites Peter to join the Fantastic Four to take Reed's place.

== Characters introduced in Spider-Verse ==
The various Spider-Men who appear in the storyline, art by Gabriele Dell'Otto

In the "Spider-Verse" event, a multitude of new Spider-Men (and women) from throughout the multiverse are revealed.

=== Spider-UK (Earth-833) ===
Billy Braddock, a.k.a. Spider-UK, is a British-based version of Spider-Man and a member of the Captain Britain Corps. He became a sole survivor from his universe after his home reality was destroyed during Time Runs Out and chose to remain in the reality of the defeated Inheritors, along with Anya Corazon. During Spider-Verse vol. 2, set during the Secret Wars event, Spider-UK and Anya Corazon found themselves in the domain of the Battleworld called Arachnia with no memories of how they got there and eventually teamed up with Spider-Gwen, Spider-Ham, Spider-Man Noir, and Spider-Man: India, neither of them remembering their previous encounter during the original "Spider-Verse" event. Following the conclusion of Secret Wars, the team of six Spiders will rename itself and be featured in a new ongoing series called Web Warriors, a name that was coined by Peter Parker from the Ultimate Spider-Man TV series during the original "Spider-Verse" event. During Spider-Geddon, when the Inheritors came back, Verna snapped Spider-UK's neck, killing him.

=== Spider-Gwen (Earth-65) ===
An alternative teenage version of Gwen Stacy who was bitten by the radioactive spider instead of Peter. On this Earth, Peter Parker's anger at being bullied results in him transforming himself into the Lizard. When he dies due to the chemicals he used in the transformation, Gwen is inspired to use her powers to help others.

- Spider-Gwen appears in the films Spider-Man: Into the Spider-Verse and its sequel Spider-Man: Across the Spider-Verse, voiced by Hailee Steinfeld.

=== Dr. Aaron "Spider-Man" Aikman (Earth-31411) ===
Dr. Aaron Aikman is a young scientist who fights crime as "the Spider-Man", using a gadget-laden suit of high tech body armor.

=== Patton Parnell (Earth-51412) ===
Patton Parnell is a disturbed, bullied teenager who, upon being bitten by a radioactive spider, becomes a twisted, bloodthirsty variant of Spider-Man/the Man-Spider and is subsequently killed by Morlun.

=== SP//dr (Earth-14512) ===
Peni Parker is a teenage girl who pilots the SP//dr, a mech suit partially controlled by a radioactive spider, whom Peni has a psychic connection with after being bitten by it.

- Peni appears as a supporting character in Spider-Man: Into The Spider-Verse, and has a cameo in its sequel Spider-Man: Across the Spider-Verse, voiced by Kimiko Glenn.

=== Spider-Wolf (Earth-13989) ===
Spider-Wolf is a werewolf version of Spider-Man who is killed by Karn.

=== Spider Moon-Man (Earth-449) ===
Spider Moon-Man is a version of Spider-Man from a universe where humans have successfully colonized the Moon.

=== "Golden Sponge Cakes" Hostess Spider-Man (Earth-51914) ===
The "Golden Sponge Cakes" Spider-Man is a parody of the version of Spider-Man that appeared in Hostess Cakes advertisements during the 1970s and 1980s. He uses Hostess's Twinkies, Chocolate Cakes, Fruit Pies and Golden Sponge Cakes to defeat villains in his universe.

=== Old Man Spider (Earth-4) ===
Old Man Spider is Ezekiel Sims. He took the Spider-Man mantle after his reality's Peter Parker was killed by Morlun. He died during the Spiders' clash with the Inheritors, but was able to warn the Spider-Man of Earth-616 to protect the "Other" and the "Bride".

=== Cosmic Spider-Man (Earth-13) ===
The Cosmic Spider-Man is a version of Spider-Man who retained the powers of the Enigma Force following its possession of him. The side effect is that his abilities will only work on his Earth. He is killed by Solus.

=== Cyborg Spider-Man (Earth-2818) ===
The Cyborg Spider-Man is introduced during the Spiders' battle with Karn, where the origin of his implants are never explained. He is destroyed at the hands of Daemos.

=== Lady Spider (Earth-803) ===
Lady Spider is May Reilly. Her father keeps a large number of animals in his study and when she is bitten by a spider she tries to pet, she realizes that, like the spider, she too is caged. Lady Spider does not have spider-powers, but instead uses a steampunk set of mechanical spider legs.

=== Man-Spider (Earth-15011) ===
In this alternate reality, the Man-Spider is Peter Parker who has an allergic reaction to the bite of the radioactive spider and is hospitalized. Because both Uncle Ben and Aunt May are at Peter's side in the hospital when their house is broken into, Ben is not killed by the burglar as in the 616 timeline. He is discovered by the Six-Armed Spider-Man and Spider-Man Noir, who cure him of his spider-powers.

=== Spider-Punk (Earth-138) ===
Spider-Punk (a.k.a. the Anarchic Spider-Man) is an African-American punk rocker named Hobart Brown who joins the Spiders' battle with the Inheritors. On his own world, he helped lead a populist revolution against the corrupt President Norman Osborn and his Venom-enhanced police force.

- Spider-Punk appears in the Ultimate Spider-Man series, voiced by Drake Bell using a Cockney accent.
- Spider-Punk appears in Spider-Man: Across the Spider-Verse, voiced by Daniel Kaluuya and is depicted as a Briton.

=== Spider-Girl (Earth-11) ===
Spider-Girl is an 11-year-old girl named Penelope Parker who gains spider powers after being bitten by a radioactive spider. She dons a homemade costume and becomes Spider-Girl, despite viewing her new powers as "gross".

=== Hobgoblin (Peter Parker) (Earth-21205) ===
After Earth-21205's version of Gwen Stacy died, an enraged Peter murdered the Green Goblin and becomes this universe's version of the Hobgoblin. Spider-Woman (Gwen Stacy) attempts to recruit him while on the run from the Inheritor Verna. He dies saving Gwen from Verna.

=== Arácnido Jr. (Earth-15349) ===
In an unidentified alternate reality, Arácnido Jr. is the son of a luchador who died after being betrayed by his tag team partner. This version of Spider-Man protects the streets of Mexico City and wears a costume inspired by that of his father.

=== Spider-Ma'am (Earth-3123) ===
On this universe, Aunt May was bitten by the radioactive spider instead of Peter, and takes the identity of Spider-Ma'am. She and her family are confronted by Karn. Sensing that he is too strong for her, she proposes to offer her life for the sake of her family, causing Karn to hesitate for a moment (because she reminded him of his mother). Before Karn tries to kill her, the other Spider Totems intervene and convince him to join them in their fight against the Inheritors.

== Characters introduced in Spider-Geddon ==
In Spider-Geddon, a multitude of new Spider-Men (and women) from throughout the multiverse are revealed.

=== Spider-Ben and Pete (Earth-91918) ===
In this universe, Peter and Ben Parker live together in a Latin and Spanish neighborhood and Ben is married to a Spanish Aunt May. When Ben got shot by a mugger, he had a blood transfusion with Peter and got his nephew's spider-powers. When Ben became a Spider-Man, he was a ruthless hero who once severely beat up Kraven the Hunter. He, alongside Peter, battled crime until May died from unknown causes.

=== Spider-Man (Norman Osborn) (Earth-44145) ===
On this universe, Norman Osborn is a six-armed version of Spider-Man. As Norman is informed of Harry moving through Oscorp and having been secretly armed, he is told that Harry is on the 15th floor near Mr. Warren's lab. Becoming Spider-Man and arriving where a warped Cosmic Cube is located, Norman confronts Harry, who dons the Kobold armor. It is revealed during the fight that Norman killed Peter Parker as Harry fires a laser beam at the warped Cosmic Cube. As Oscorp starts to disintegrate, Norman is pleased that Harry finally gave him what he wanted by accidentally giving Norman access to the multiverse. Just then, Spider-Punk arrives and pulls Norman out, much to his dismay. In the end of the event, after destroying the Web of Life along with Spiders-Man, he is seen holding a piece of the Web inside a container with an evil smile on his face. He returns targeting Octavius as the Superior Spider-Man, attempting to force Octavius to prove that he is still a villain by threatening to kill those close to Octavius unless Octavius kills three innocent people in the next few hours, but Octavius defeats him by making a deal with Mephisto to restore his original body and powers, banishing Osborn out of this reality.

=== Web-Slinger (Earth-31913) ===
In the universe based on the Old West, there is a cowboy version of Spider-Man called the Web-Slinger who rides a Spider-Horse and has six-gun web-shooters. He was first seen investigating Doc Morbius' bloodsucking rampage and child abductions. After Doc Morbius is defeated, the Web-Slinger is advised by Doc Morbius to rescue the children before the chemicals reach the flames. The Web-Slinger does so as Doc Morbius perishes in the explosion. The children then notice that the Web-Slinger's horse is wearing a mask and ask about it. In Spider-Verse: Spider-Zero, his civilian identity is established as Ponderosa Parker, whose birth name was Patrick O'Hara (after the civilian identity the character was given in the film Spider-Man: Across the Spider-Verse).

- Web-Slinger and his Spider-Horse appear in Spider-Man: Across the Spider-Verse, voiced by Taran Killam. The film establishes Web-Slinger's secret identity as Patrick O'Hara. Killam had previously written the story "Best Little Horror House" in Extreme Venomverse #3, which features Web-Slinger.

=== Spider-Byte (Earth-22191) ===
Margo Kess as she appears in Across the Spider-Verse

On this Earth, an African-American girl named Margo operates as the superhero Spider-Byte. She is a genius student at the Peter Parker Memorial (Institute) of Science & Technology. In her world, virtual reality has become so mainstream that the majority of people choose to spend more time in it than in the real world; as a result, Margo created the "Spider-Byte" persona to operate as a hero in the virtual world, fighting against digital threats. In her first appearance, she stops a virtual reality identity thief who robbed someone's online account before heading to class.

- Spider-Byte appears in Spider-Man: Across the Spider-Verse, given the full name Margo Kess. She is voiced by Amandla Stenberg. Furthermore, Margo took the longest time to animate and design in Across the Spider-Verse, due to the animators intensely studying late 80s to mid 90s hologram technology for her movements and overall appearance.

=== Savage Spider-Man (Earth-83043) ===
This alternate universe has a version of Peter Parker / Spider-Man who lives in the Savage Land. When Peter and his family were flying inside a plane, the engine started burning and Peter's parents gave him the only parachute left in the plane to save him. Peter landed on the Savage Land, where he was raised by a tribe of giant spiders. The spiders made Peter to go under the Trial of 1,000 Venoms, where he was injected different venoms by the spiders to see if Peter would survive. He succeeded, and from the trial he got spider-powers as the Savage Spider-Man. Now with his powers, he protects the land from intruders like Wilson Fisk of the company Kingliner and Ka-Zar the Hunter when they are poaching dinosaurs. There was also a mentioning that Ka-Zar the Hunter's father killed the last of the Man-Things, as he unknowingly sets off one of the Savage Spider-Man's traps that nearly crushes Ka-Zar the Hunter. The Savage Spider-Man then confronts Wilson Fisk, who recognizes him as Peter Parker. A flashback in a discussion between Richard and Mary Parker and Wilson Fisk mentioned that Peter was supposed to stay with his aunt until something happened to his uncle. When Fisk's soldiers show up to attack, the giant spiders also arrive and attack the soldiers, while some of them follow Fisk onto his airplane. The Savage Spider-Man swings away as more giant spiders surround the airplane.

=== Spider-Kid (Earth-218) ===
Peter Parker in this universe, changed his name to Charlie, because of the abuses of Uncle Ben and Aunt May. This also brings Charlie to become a problematic kid, spending two years at the Administration for Child Services and another two at Horizon Juvenile Detention Center. He becomes Spider-Kid at 13 years old and lives by himself.

=== Astro-Spider (Earth-3145) ===
John Jameson is the son of Jonah Jameson and an astronaut working for NASA. During a trip on a Space Shuttle, he gets bitten by a spider while being struck by cosmic waves and was forced to make an emergency landing, where he survives while his Earth is ravaged by a thermonuclear war. He then found himself having Spider-Man powers such as telekinetic webs in addition to telepathy. He is killed by Verna.

=== Spiders-Man (Earth-11580) ===
Spiders-Man is actually thousands of spiders working together as a hive mind that think they are Peter Parker. On this Earth when Peter Parker and Gwen Stacy visited Horizon Labs, he fell in a pit full of radioactive spiders which consumed him. His consciousness is absorbed into them. When the Goblin Nation (this team is composed of the Green Goblin, the Hobgoblin, the Demogoblin and Jack O'Lantern) arrives to kill Gwen Stacy, Spiders-Man saves her. After defeating the Goblins, they abandoned the costume.

Spiders-Man joins up with the Superior Spider-Man's group. He also assists Spider-Man of Earth-44145 in a secret plan to keep the Inheritors on Earth-616.

One of the spiders that makes up Spiders-Man of Earth-11580 later spies on the Superior Spider-Man on behalf of Spider-Man of Earth-44145. After being told the information he received from Spiders-Man of Earth-11580 after seeing Elliot Tolliver on his date with Emma Hernanfez, Spider-Man of Earth-44145 begins his revenge plans on the Superior Spider-Man.

=== The Spider (George Stacy) (Earth-91053) ===
On an unnamed Earth; George Stacy gained spider-powers, and wears a black homemade suit (with white stripes included in the upper part) as "The Spider". He saves Betty Brant from a female version of the Shocker.

=== Spider-Man (Harry Osborn) (Earth-3109) ===
During the return of the Inheritors, Spider-Gwen's device to travel through the multiverse got destroyed by Verna and then Gwen got stranded in an unidentified alternate universe. In this universe, Peter Parker and this universe's Gwen Stacy got a job at Oscorp and Peter wanted to create a cure for cancer after his Uncle Ben died from it. Peter was experimenting with spider venom to create the cure, but one of the spiders bit Harry Osborn, making Harry this universe's Spider-Man. Harry, alongside Gwen Stacy as this universe's Green Goblin, started to fight crime together until, during a fight with the Sandman, both Harry and Gwen's father got killed.

=== Spider-Cop (Earth-19119) ===
Spider-Cop is a version of Spider-Man who works for the New York Police Department in his reality. Described by Miles as a "grizzled veteran of the force", Spider-Cop wears a police uniform over his costume alongside a police cap, sunglasses, and a mustache over his mask. The Spider-Man of Earth-1048, who frequently assumes the persona of Spider-Cop in his own reality, is surprised that Spider-Cop actually exists. Spider-Cop later joins the other Spider-Totems summoned by the Spider-Man of Earth-616 and Spider-Gwen.

=== Spider-Man (Stan Lee) ===
From an unknown universe, a Stan Lee variation of Spider-Man exists. He appeared during the final battle of the Inheritors and when New U Technologies' cloning technology was used to revive the Inheritors as babies.

== Characters introduced in Spider-Verse: Spider-Zero ==
The 2019 limited series Spider-Verse (collected as Spider-Verse: Spider-Zero) introduces yet another bevy of alternate universe versions of the character that play parts in the Spider-Verse: Spider-Zero storyline.

=== Spider-Zero (Earth-19166) ===
The young spider-powered woman who would become known as Spider-Zero, on being saved from the destruction of her universe Earth-19166 during Secret Wars by Little Ben, travelled the multiverse so much so-as to no longer consider any reality her home, becoming the new Master Weaver (after Kara) after the Patternmaker recreated the Great Web of Life and Destiny.

- Spider-Zero appears in the video game Marvel Rivals (2024), voiced by Daisy Lightfoot.

=== Little Ben (Earth-19166) ===
Little Ben is a spider able to create spider-shaped portals across the multiverse, who uses his webbing to save Spider-Zero's life ahead of acting as her companion in guarding the Great Web of Life and Destiny.

=== Evil Miles Morales and the Evil Parker family (Earth-20143) ===
On Earth-20143, Miles Morales is the supervillain Spider-Man, wearing an inverted version of the Earth-1610 Miles' uniform, who together with the equally evil Carnage (May Parker), her husband Ben, and nephew Peter, travel the multiverse to "paint it red".

== Characters introduced in End of Spider-Verse ==
The 2022 limited series Edge of Spider-Verse introduces yet another bevy of alternate universe versions of the character that play parts in the End of the Spider-Verse storyline.

=== Spider-Rex (Earth-66) ===
On Earth-66, a weak Pteranodon named Pter Ptarker is chased by the Tyrannosaurus Norranosaurus and his lackeys, until a meteor containing alien spiders strikes the moment when Norranosaurus bites Pter, causing them to switch bodies. Upon becoming Spider-Rex, Pter fights off Norranosaurus and his lackeys.

- Spider-Rex appears in Spider-Man: Across the Spider-Verse.

=== Night-Spider (Earth-194) ===
An alternate version of Felicia Hardy who gains spider-powers after being bitten by the Delvadian Spider Idol statue that she stole. With her new abilities, she becomes Night-Spider.

=== Spider-UK (Earth-834) ===
British teenager Zarina Zahari is secretly the second Spider-UK, a superpowered agent of the Weird Happenings Organization (or W.H.O.) on her world. After saving London from a gigantic dragon, Zarina is recruited by Earth-616's Madame Web to help avert a crisis that threatens all of the spiders of the multiverse.

=== Spinstress (Earth-423) ===
On a Disney fairy tale-inspired world where characters frequently break into song, Princess Petra, a young royal who longs to escape the restrictive lifestyle imposed on her by her overprotective mother, Queen Mysteria. After being visited by her Fairy Gob-Mother Norma, Petra is granted magical spider powers with the caveat that if she does not give them up by midnight, she will lose her chance at true love. While attending a royal ball under the costumed identity of Spinstress, Petra is forced to keep her powers in order to battle her mother, secretly the villainess known as the Mysterious Empress. Despite missing her chance with "Merry" James Watson, a bard she loves, Petra vows to use her powers to fight evil with her pet spider Webster.

After the events of End of the Spider-Verse, Petra returns home and finds that her mother has fallen ill after their battle as a result of her shattering the orb Mysteria was using. She tracks down Kraven the Huntsman and his pet vulture Adrienne to Goblin Forest after he kidnapped James, where she also encounters the Fairy Gob-Mother and discovers that she was using Mysteria's hate to power the orb so she could conquer the kingdoms. After defeating Kraven, Petra blackmails Norma into curing Mysteria before James destroys the orb. Petra returns home happy that her mother is cured and looking forward to spending time with James, though unbeknownst to her, destroying the orb unleashed an evil black creature that transforms James into a demonic monster.

=== Sun-Spider (Earth-20023) ===
Sun-Spider is Charlotte "Charlie" Webber, a teenage girl with Ehlers–Danlos syndrome, which results in her using forearm crutches and a wheelchair. Despite her disability, Charlie possesses the usual set of spider-powers, which allow her to traverse the city with ease while carrying a folding wheelchair on her back and making use of special crutches equipped with web-shooters. She's best friends with Glory Grant, Angelica Jones, and a girl named Aster, the last of whom she has a crush on (and is secretly the superheroine Histamina).

- Sun-Spider appears in Spider-Man: Across the Spider-Verse, voiced by Danielle Perez.

=== Hunter Spider (Earth-31) ===
An alternate version of Sergei Kravinoff who gains spider-powers after being bitten while fighting a giant spider during a safari in Zimbabwe. Taking on the costumed identity of Hunter Spider, Kravinoff hunts down and kills his world's versions of Spider-Man's various animal-themed adversaries, such as Black Cat, Vulture, Rhino, Stegron, Puma and White Rabbit, with their bodies kept as hunting trophies in his home.

=== Web-Weaver (Earth-71490) ===
Character design art for Web-Weaver by Kris Anka

Web-Weaver is Cooper Coen, a gay former classmate of Peter Parker who is bitten by the radioactive spider after pushing Peter out of the way. Thrown out by his homophobic parents, Cooper is taken in by his paternal aunt Laurie and her wife Mel, whose kindness and civic mindedness inspire him to become a costumed hero. Balancing a double life as a superhero and a fashion designer working for Janet van Dyne, Cooper also has a crush on the vigilante Silk, who, unbeknownst to him, is secretly his ex-boyfriend Albert Moon Jr. When Chameleon targets internet celebrity Silvija Sablinova, Web-Weaver and Silk save her and defeat Chameleon. Web-Weaver kisses Silk before being recruited to help fight Shathra.

First announced in June 2022, Web-Weaver was introduced in Edge of Spider-Verse vol. 2 #5 (October 2022). The character was created by writer Steve Foxe and artist Kris Anka. Anka said that Web-Weaver's costume was influenced by the work of fashion designers Alexander McQueen and Thierry Mugler, as well as "new and unique spiders" recommended by Foxe.

== Minor references ==
=== Age of Apocalypse ===
In the "Age of Apocalypse", Peter Parker is executed by Apocalypse's regime because he is a potential ally for rebel Gwen Stacy.

=== Counter-Earth ===
Peter Parker's counterpart on Counter-Earth is mentioned as having "died from radioactive over-exposure".

=== Spider-Cat ===
In another alternate universe, Spider-Man is a cat who is known as Spider-Cat and fights a psychopathic pigeon named Venom.

=== Murder victims ===
Spider-Man was depicted as one of many murder victims in Punisher Kills the Marvel Universe, Marvel Universe vs. the Punisher, Deadpool Kills the Marvel Universe, Deadpool Kills the Marvel Universe Again. and Edge of Venomverse

=== Earth-691 ===
In the Earth-691 continuity, Spider-Man is a time traveler who aids Killraven in fighting a second invasion by the Martians from H. G. Wells' The War of the Worlds, during which he is killed.

=== Contest of Champions ===
In Contest of Champions, a version of Spider-Man is killed by Venom, who then wears his costume as a cape. Venom is then taunted by Spider-Man's voice until he himself is killed.

=== Old Man Logan ===
In Old Man Logan, Spider-Man was killed during or sometime after the event where the villains rose to power and the heroes fell. In this timeline, he is implied to have married an unknown African-American woman and had a daughter, Tonya, who eventually married Hawkeye and had a child of their own, Ashley. Hawkeye won a poker game and customized the Spider-Mobile after his death.

=== Pestilence ===
Deadpool encounters a version of Spider-Man in a universe which he refers to as "an Age of Apocalypse" (not the Age of Apocalypse). This alternative version of Spider-Man is Pestilence, a Horseman of Apocalypse. He has six arms, poisonous fangs, and engages in cannibalism.

=== X-Men Forever ===
In the X-Men Forever universe after the X-Men have faked their deaths, Spider-Man runs into Rogue during a patrol, Rogue having recently unintentionally absorbed Nightcrawler's powers and appearance. Testing her new powers, Rogue spends the night fighting crime alongside Spider-Man, later suggesting that the two kiss to see how her recent transformation has affected her original abilities. After Spider-Man assists the X-Men in destroying a group of Sentinels, the X-Men return to the manor, Cyclops concluding that Spider-Man can be trusted to keep the secret of their continued survival.

=== Earth-65 ===
When attempting to give himself superpowers in response to bullying, the Earth-65 version of Peter Parker accidentally transforms himself into the Lizard. Having not witnessed his transformation, Spider-Woman (Gwen Stacy) violently subdues him, leading to Peter reverting to human form and dying from his injuries in the arms of Gwen, who had been his best friend. Spider-Woman is blamed for his murder, causing an uproar for her arrest, led by J. Jonah Jameson, with her eventually giving herself up for the crime of manslaughter.

- The Peter Parker incarnation of the Lizard makes a cameo appearance in a flashback in Spider-Man: Into the Spider-Verse. After Spider-Woman defeats him, he reverts to Peter Parker and dies in her arms.
- The Peter Parker incarnation of the Lizard returns in Spider-Man: Across the Spider-Verse, voiced by Jack Quaid. In his expanded backstory, Peter was Gwen's only friend and a fan of Spider-Woman before taking chemicals and transforming into the Lizard. Left mindless, he attempts to get revenge on those who bullied him at the school prom, only to be subdued by Gwen, who accidentally knocks him into the building's foundations and causing the roof to collapse, fatally crushing him. Dying, Peter reveals he knew that Gwen was Spider-Woman, apologising for his mistake. His death leads to Gwen avoiding making any more friends until meeting Miles Morales and for Gwen's father Captain Stacy to lead a manhunt on Spider-Woman until he learns the truth about her.

=== Avengers of the Undead ===
A monstrous version of Spider-Man was part of the Avengers of the Undead.

=== Image Universe ===
A powerless spectacled Peter Parker makes a cameo appearance in the 2010 Chew graphic novel Just Desserts, set in the Image Universe, uncomfortably sharing an elevator with Tony Chu, John Colby, and Jimmy Olsen. The Earth-616 Spider-Man would then meet the Image Universe superhero Invincible when he travelled to his dimension in Marvel Team-Up (set during the events of Invincible: Three's Company).

== In other media ==
There are many other versions of Spider-Man outside of comic books; some in film, in television or in video games, among countless other media. Some characters have crossed over in the comic book canon as one of the separate incarnations, such as the Ultimate Spider-Man animated series version and the live-action Japanese show version appearing in "Spider-Verse". Also, one of the alternate Spider-Men from the series finale of Spider-Man: The Animated Series appeared in "Spider-Verse" as a background character, and the two live-action versions from the original and Amazing Spider-Man film series are mentioned.

=== Japanese Spider-Man (Earth-51778) ===
Takuya Yamashiro, colloquially known as the Japanese Spider-Man, is the protagonist of Toei's 1978 Spider-Man television series, portrayed by Kōsuke Kayama (Shinji Tōdō). He is the first live-action adaptation of Spider-Man and, outside his role in the 1978 series, he later starred in the Spider-Verse comic book storyline and its sequels. This version of Spider-Man is notable for having an entirely different origin story and for gaining his powers from a "Spider Bracelet", which alters his DNA and can also be used to summon a giant robot companion called Leopardon.

=== Spider-Man (Earth-96283) ===
In the 2002–07 Spider-Man film trilogy, Peter Parker is portrayed by Tobey Maguire. This film trilogy portrays Peter gaining his abilities in his final days in high school and becoming a college student at Columbia University. While initially using his powers for selfish reasons, Peter is inspired by the death of his Uncle Ben to accept the responsibility that come with them, and begins fighting crime as Spider-Man. He navigates his relationships with his childhood crush-turned-friend and eventual girlfriend Mary Jane Watson, best friend Harry Osborn, his Aunt May, and his boss J. Jonah Jameson, while fighting adversaries such as the Green Goblin, Doctor Octopus, Sandman, Venom, and temporarily Harry as the New Goblin. Unlike most versions of Spider-Man, Maguire's iteration can shoot organic spider web from his wrists. He is also soft-spoken and is noted to be more aloof, reserved and less sociable in personality, lacking the consistently wisecracking nature of the comics version and later cinematic portrayals of the character. Maguire's Parker / Spider-Man also appears in video games associated with this film trilogy.

=== Spider-Man (Earth-120703) ===
The Spider-Man film series was rebooted after Spider-Man 3, with a new iteration of Peter Parker being portrayed by Andrew Garfield in The Amazing Spider-Man and its sequel. Peter is portrayed in these films as a more snarky, angst-driven, and troubled but intelligent high school student whose parents Richard and Mary Parker were Oscorp scientists who disappeared and presumably died when Peter was young while attempting to prevent the company from exploiting their work for malevolent purposes. He also begins to date Gwen Stacy. Upon trying to learn about his parents' past from their colleague Curt Connors, Peter sneaks into Oscorp and is bitten by genetically modified spiders, gaining his abilities. He tracks down Connors and works with him to continue the work his father and Connors did, but inadvertently plays a part in Connors becoming the Lizard. Peter, who initially uses his powers in an attempt to track down his Uncle Ben's killer, is later inspired to protect New York City's residents as Spider-Man and thwart the Lizard's schemes. He later faces Electro and the Green Goblin, and temporarily gives up being a superhero after Gwen dies while assisting him against the two villains, before eventually coming out of retirement months later.

=== Spider-Man (MCU, "Earth-616") ===
In the Marvel Cinematic Universe, a much younger version of Peter Parker / Spider-Man is played by English actor Tom Holland. The origins of Holland's iteration of the character are not explored in-depth like Maguire and Garfield's portrayals, though he is recruited by Tony Stark / Iron Man into his faction of the Avengers during a dispute with Steve Rogers / Captain America. While continuing to work with Stark and the Avengers as an intern and gaining access to advanced technology for his suit, Peter also navigates high school life with his best friends Ned Leeds and Michelle "MJ" Jones, the latter of whom becomes his girlfriend. He joins the Avengers once more against Thanos in a universal conflict, and also fights against Vulture and Mysterio. After Mysterio exposes his secret identity to the world, Peter works with Doctor Strange to have the world forget he's Spider-Man, but ends up creating a rift in the multiverse that brings in the Spider-Men from the Raimi trilogy and the Amazing duology as well as their respective rogues gallery, who kill his Aunt May. After the three Spider-Men contain them, Peter has Strange conjure a spell that makes the entire world forget he existed, including Ned and MJ.

After The Amazing Spider-Man 2 failed to meet expectations, Sony Pictures and Marvel Studios negotiated a deal that would allow Spider-Man to join the Marvel Cinematic Universe, with a new iteration of the character created for the film franchise starting with Captain America: Civil War. While Marvel and its parent company Disney would gain distribution rights of Spider-Man's appearances in crossover films, Sony would continue to release Spider-Man's stand-alone films in the MCU, starting with Spider-Man: Homecoming.

=== Spider-Man (Earth-1048) ===
The universe of Earth-1048 is the main setting for the Marvel's Spider-Man series and associated video games, developed by Insomniac Games and published by Sony Interactive Entertainment for PlayStation consoles and Microsoft Windows. The universe was introduced with Marvel's Spider-Man: Hostile Takeover, a prequel novel to the video game Marvel's Spider-Man released on August 21, 2018.

==== Insomniac's Peter Parker ====
Peter Parker
- Marvel's Spider-Man character
- First appearance: Marvel's Spider-Man: Hostile Takeover (2018)
- Based on: Spider-Man by: Stan Lee; Steve Ditko
- Adapted by: Jon Paquette; Benjamin Arfmann; Kelsey Beachum; Christos Gage; Dan Slott
- Voiced by: Yuri Lowenthal

In-universe information
- Full name: Peter Benjamin Parker
- Alias: Spider-Man
- Species: Human mutate
- Occupation: Student (formerly); Photographer (formerly); Scientist; Homeless shelter volunteer; Vigilante
- Affiliation: Daily Bugle (formerly); Octavius Industries (formerly); F.E.A.S.T. Emily-May Foundation
- Relatives: Ben Parker (uncle); May Parker (aunt)
- Origin: Queens, New York City
- Nationality: American
- Abilities: Superhuman strength, speed, agility, reflexes, stamina, and durability; Ability to cling to solid surfaces; Precognitive spider-sense ability; Skilled martial artist and hand-to-hand combatant; Genius-level intellect; Proficient scientist and engineer; Utilizes web-shooters; Enhanced powers and tendrils via the Anti-Venom symbiote

In this continuity, Peter Parker has been Spider-Man for eight years, and he and Mary Jane Watson are no longer in a relationship. He does not work for the Daily Bugle anymore, but instead works as an assistant to Dr. Otto Octavius, who was Peter's idol and father figure until he sought revenge on Norman Osborn. Octavius steals and releases the Devil's Breath virus, a dangerous bioweapon created by Oscorp, to tarnish Osborn's image, at the cost of many New York residents becoming infected, including Peter's Aunt May. After a climactic battle against Octavius, Peter obtains the cure to the virus, but is unable to save May as the sample was needed to reproduce it, and May's condition had progressed to the point where she died before a cure could be mass-produced. In her final moments, May reveals that she knew about Peter's identity as Spider-Man and that she is proud of her nephew.

In Spider-Geddon, the Superior Spider-Man recruits Peter to fight the Inheritors after they defeated the Tarantula. By the events of Marvel's Spider-Man: Miles Morales, Peter has rekindled his relationship with Mary Jane and begun training Miles Morales, who had also gained spider-like abilities. After working with Miles to prevent Rhino's escape amidst a prison transfer, Peter leaves New York under Miles' protection as he accompanies Mary Jane on a journalistic excursion to Symkaria to cover the country's ongoing civil war. Returning to New York weeks later, Peter resumes his role as Spider-Man, now with Miles as his equal partner. In Marvel's Spider-Man 2, Peter, Miles, and Mary Jane come into conflict with Kraven the Hunter and the Venom symbiote, which bonds itself to Peter and amplifies his negative emotions. After removing the symbiote with Miles' help, Peter is forced to battle his childhood friend, Harry Osborn, who becomes Venom and attempts to infect the entire world with the symbiote. The Spider-Men are able to stop him, after which Peter decides to take a break from his superhero activities to focus on his personal life, trusting Miles to be the sole Spider-Man.

Yuri Lowenthal voices the character in all three of his video game appearances, as well as a cameo appearance in Spider-Man: Across the Spider-Verse.

==== Insomniac's Miles Morales ====
Miles Morales
- Marvel's Spider-Man character
- First appearance: Marvel's Spider-Man (2018)
- Based on: Miles Morales by: Brian Michael Bendis; Sara Pichelli
- Adapted by: Jon Paquette; Benjamin Arfmann; Kelsey Beachum; Christos Gage; Dan Slott
- Voiced by: Nadji Jeter

In-universe information
- Full name: Miles Gonzalo Morales
- Alias: Spider-Man
- Nickname: New York's Only Spider-Man
- Species: Human mutate
- Occupation: Student; Homeless shelter volunteer; Vigilante
- Affiliation: Brooklyn Visions Academy; F.E.A.S.T.
- Family: Jefferson Davis (father); Rio Morales (mother)
- Relatives: Aaron Davis (uncle)
- Origin: Brooklyn, New York City
- Nationality: American
- Abilities: Superhuman strength, speed, agility, reflexes, stamina, and durability; Ability to cling to solid surfaces; Precognitive spider-sense ability; Camouflage (invisibility); Venom strike/Venom blast; Bio-electric manipulation; Skilled martial artist and hand-to-hand combatant; Genius-level intellect; Utilizes web-shooters

Miles Morales takes on the role of another featured Spider-Man within the Insomniac Games universe. He is briefly playable in Marvel's Spider-Man, stars as the sole protagonist of Marvel's Spider-Man: Miles Morales, and returns as a playable character in Marvel's Spider-Man 2. He is voiced in all three games by Nadji Jeter.

In Marvel's Spider-Man, Miles is introduced as a fan of Spider-Man who grew up idolizing the hero and with an affinity for science. He loses his father, Jefferson Davis, during a terrorist attack orchestrated by Mister Negative and, at Peter Parker's advice, begins volunteering at F.E.A.S.T. to cope with his loss. He is later bitten by a genetically modified spider created by Oscorp and develops spider-like powers; after showing his newfound abilities to Peter, the latter reveals his identity as Spider-Man and begins mentoring Miles. This leads to the events of Marvel's Spider-Man: Miles Morales, where Peter temporarily departs New York, leaving Miles as the sole Spider-Man. While adapting into his new role, he fights to protect his new home, Harlem, from a war between Roxxon and the Underground criminal group, led by his childhood friend Phin Mason / Tinkerer. In Marvel's Spider-Man 2, Miles assumes the role of secondary protagonist, helping Peter fight against Kraven the Hunter and Venom while pursuing a personal vendetta against Mister Negative, whom he eventually learns to forgive.

=== Lego Spider-Man (Earth-13122) ===
In both the Lego Marvel video games series and Spider-Man: Across the Spider-Verse, the Lego Spider-Man character exists in a world made entirely of Lego. This version of Peter Parker / Spider-Man has a history similar to his mainstream counterpart and plays a role in the storylines of both Lego Marvel Super Heroes and Lego Marvel Super Heroes 2. In Lego Marvel's Avengers, he was added as a playable character via downloadable content. In Across the Spider-Verse, the Lego version of Spider-Man makes a cameo appearance and is voiced by Nic Novicki.

In addition to Peter Parker, Lego versions of other Spider-Man characters, such as Spider-Gwen, Spider-Man 2099, and Spider-Ham, also exist within the same continuity.

=== Spider-Man (Earth-26496) ===
This Earth is the designated setting for the animated series The Spectacular Spider-Man (2008), which stars a younger Peter Parker, still in high school and at the beginning of his career as Spider-Man. Peter is voiced by Josh Keaton, who reprised his role for a cameo appearance in Spider-Man: Across the Spider-Verse.

=== Spider-Verse films ===
The 2018 animated film Spider-Man: Into the Spider-Verse adapts the "Spider-Verse" storyline and the Ultimate Spider-Man books starring Miles Morales. Variations of Miles Morales, Spider-Gwen, Spider-Ham, Spider-Noir, SP//dr, Spider-Man 2099, and a divergent version of the Spider-Man from the 1960s animated series (voiced by Shameik Moore, Hailee Steinfeld, John Mulaney, Nicolas Cage, Kimiko Glenn, Oscar Isaac, and Jorma Taccone, respectively) are featured.

The film also features two different versions of Peter Parker. The version in Miles' dimension, Earth-1610B, has been Spider-Man for 10 years, was married to Mary Jane Watson, and also had a secret underground lair in Aunt May's backyard that housed dozens of different Spider-Man costumes and gear. In the film's first act, he is killed by the Kingpin while trying to stop the villain from using a particle accelerator to access other dimensions. His death inspires the recently bitten Miles Morales into carrying on his mission as the new Spider-Man and stopping the Kingpin from endangering the city. Unlike other versions, this version of Peter has blond hair. He was voiced by Chris Pine.

Spider-Man's exposure to the particle accelerator causes Peter B. Parker, the Spider-Man of Earth-616B, to get sucked into Miles' dimension. This version of Peter is in his late 30s and has been Spider-Man for 22 years. He was also married to Mary Jane Watson, but they divorced after he refused to have children with her. This, coupled with the death of his Aunt May, sent Peter's life into a downward spiral where he gave up being the wall-crawler, resulting in him getting lazier and overweight. He reluctantly agrees to mentor Miles on becoming the new Spider-Man to return to his home dimension, but later tries to prevent Miles from joining the other displaced Spider-Men when the young hero's inexperience begins to hold them back and volunteers to sacrifice himself so the other heroes can get home. Miles later joins them in the final fight against the Kingpin and his minions after he learns how to control his powers and instills new confidence in Peter that he will successfully defend his dimension. Thanks to his experience with Miles and a run-in with an alternate version of his ex, Peter decides to give his relationship with Mary Jane another shot. He was voiced by Jake Johnson.

The sequel, Spider-Man: Across the Spider-Verse, features a multitude of alternate Spider people, many original creations but also many returning Spider-Man variants, including Spider-Man 2099, Spider-Woman, Spider-Punk, Spider-Man India, the Scarlet Spider, the Spectacular Spider-Man, Insomniac's Spider-Man, and Spider-Byte.
