= Spider Woman (disambiguation) =

Spider-Woman is the name of several characters in Marvel Comics:

- Spider-Woman (Jessica Drew), the original and current Spider-Woman
  - Spider-Woman (comic book), a comic book starring Jessica Drew
- Spider-Woman (Julia Carpenter), a former Avengers member, now called Arachne and a member of Omega Flight
- Mattie Franklin, who briefly impersonated Spider-Man before receiving her own short-lived comic series was active during the 2007 miniseries Loners
- Spider-Woman (Charlotte Witter), the only villain to use the name
- Spider-Gwen, the Gwen Stacy of Earth-65 who goes by the name Spider-Woman
- Mayday Parker, who goes by the name Spider-Woman after the death of her father
- Spider-Woman (Cindy Moon), the superhero Silk, who uses the name over End of the Spider-Verse
  - "Spider-Woman (Gwen Stacy)", a track on the Spider-Man: Across the Spider-Verse soundtrack

It may also refer to:

- Spider Woman or Spider Old Woman/Spider Grandmother, in some Native American Indian myths
- Jorōgumo, a Japanese mythological spirit (obake) spider-spirit that transforms into a woman
- Spider-Woman (TV series), an animated TV series based on the Marvel Comics character Jessica Drew
- The Spider Woman, a 1944 Sherlock Holmes film
- Teotihuacan Spider Woman, a Teotihuacan goddess
- Spider Woman, the Space Ghost villain, known on Space Ghost Coast to Coast as Black Widow
- Spiderwoman Theater, an Indigenous women's performance troupe
- SpiderWoman the web browser on NeXTSTEP
- "Spider Woman" (song), by Uriah Heep, 1972
- Spider Woman (memoir), a memoir by Brenda Hale, former President of the Supreme Court of the United Kingdom

== See also ==
- Kiss of the Spider Woman (disambiguation)
