= Yancy Street Gang =

Fictional street gang

- First appearance: Fantastic Four #15 (June 1963)
- Created by: Stan Lee; Jack Kirby
- Publisher: Marvel Comics

The Yancy Street Gang is a fictional street gang appearing in American comic books published by Marvel Comics. It is occasionally featured in the Fantastic Four comic book. The gang is often seen as an antagonist for the Thing, showering him with insults, and occasionally heads of lettuce. In their early appearances, they were an "off-screen" presence, with only their hands and arms visible on-panel.

== Origins of the concept ==
Created by Stan Lee and Jack Kirby in the early days of the Fantastic Four comic, the fictional Yancy Street is a reference to the Lower East Side of Manhattan, where Kirby grew up. This was the Thing's old neighborhood as well, and the character was targeted by the Yancy Street Gang for being a "sellout" and abandoning his working-class, hoodlum roots. Kirby considered the Thing to be his "alter ego", and the character's troubled relationship with his old neighborhood has been seen as a metaphor for Kirby's own Jewish identity. A 2002 story brought the Thing back to his old neighborhood, to return a Star of David that he stole from a pawn shop as initiation into the gang; this story was the first to reveal that the character is Jewish.

== Publication history ==
The Yancy Street Gang was created by Stan Lee and Jack Kirby, and first appeared in Fantastic Four #15 (June 1963), though mostly off-panel; as in most of their appearances, only their arms are visible. Yancy Street is named in reference to the real Delancey Street, which extends from the Bowery in Manhattan's Lower East Side eastward to the Williamsburg Bridge. However, Yancy Street is seen in Fantastic Four #15 (June 1963) to intersect with 10th Avenue, which is on the west side of Manhattan.

== Fictional group history ==
The Yancy Street Gang harasses the Thing in their first appearance; panels from Fantastic Four #15 (June 1963). Art by Jack Kirby and Dick Ayers. © Marvel Comics.

The Yancy Street Gang is depicted as frequenting downtown Manhattan, and serves as a recurring antagonist of the Thing, tormenting him for typically humorous effect. It was originally depicted as composed only of youths, but later depictions have both young members as well as adult members from an earlier generation, who have passed their grudge against the Thing to the younger members. Although described as a gang, the Yancy Street Gang are rarely depicted as engaging in criminal activities (except in their harassment of the Thing, who rarely takes their actions seriously) and may be more accurately described as a circle of admittedly roughneck friends and associates who encourage neighborhood youths to divert their energies into harmlessly heckling the virtually indestructible Thing, rather than into more dangerous and illegal pursuits.

The adult members of the Yancy Street Gang, all apparently blue-collar workers (many of them typically wear hardhats) who still live in the neighborhood, are often seen tormenting the Thing in some way, usually by throwing things at him and shouting abuse whenever he entered Yancy Street. They were also thought to send him booby-trapped parcels, although a retcon in Fantastic Four vol. 3 #61, written by Mark Waid, revealed that these packages (or at least many of them) had actually been sent by the Human Torch as part of his own recurring campaign of pranks against the Thing. As a youth, Ben Grimm formerly led the gang, and the other members, who have retained their loyalty to it in adulthood, seemingly resent him for having "sold out" by leaving the neighborhood and pursuing a higher education and standard of living, culminating in his position as one of the Air Force's most accomplished pilots and, later, as a world-famous adventurer. However, they are generally portrayed as good-natured at heart and have occasionally helped the Fantastic Four if a supervillain threatens their neighborhood itself or if they think that a villain is giving the Thing too much trouble (noting on such occasions that "That's our job!"). They sometimes seem to genuinely like the Thing, if only because he makes such an effective and (sometimes) good-humored target for their pranks; they were quite remorseful when he seemingly died in action, only to quickly retract the sentiment when he proved to have survived.

Other heroes have become involved with the local life, such as when Spider-Man cleared out a Negative Zone invasion from Yancy Street and saved three residents from being lost forever.

=== Making peace ===
In The Thing #6 (2006 series), the Thing's relationship with Yancy Street was finally reconciled, after the millionaire (following events in the ongoing Fantastic Four comic) Thing donates a state-of-the-art recreational facility to the neighborhood. Initially resentful because they regarded the project as an exercise in ego, they later learned that it was named in honor of the Thing's deceased brother Daniel Grimm Jr. (another Yancy Street Gang alumnus) and they declared the facility to be under their informal protection. The facility is later seen again when Benjamin is encouraging the local youth to make use of the location, and to hit the bags instead of each other.

The adult Yancy Street Gang members are traditionally shown in the comics with their faces obscured by the shadows of their hardhats or other headwear. The younger "next generation" Yancy Streeters, however, have been fully seen, including in one story (Fantastic Four #361 "Miracle On Yancy Street!" by Paul Ryan and Tom DeFalco) which portrays the Gang with gimmicks and codenames similar to Kirby's DC Comics kid gangs.

=== Civil War ===
The Yancy Street Gang has become deeply involved during the Civil War storyline. They are part of a large group of New York citizens protesting the arrest of superheroes who do not wish to register with the United States Government. Ben Grimm becomes involved with the dispute, being asked by police forces to talk with the Gang regulars. Ben meets with Cee, a young man in a leadership position. Both Cee and the police wish for Ben to take a more active role, but he maintains his neutrality. While negotiations are going on, another gang member, Mouse, has become involved with longtime FF villains the Puppet Master and the Mad Thinker. The two men put in motion a plan that brings a superhero prisoner convoy down Yancy Street itself. Though Spider-Man recognizes the potential trouble as the convoy turns in, it is far too late.

Military forces and superheroes on both sides of the Registration Act, some affected by the villains and some fighting with their own agendas, engage in a property-damaging fight. Mouse, not in control of his own mind, drops a bomb into the middle of the fight. In an effort to save lives, Ben Grimm smashes a large, empty truck onto the bomb. This effort fails, as the explosion kills Cee. Ben furiously hands Cee's body to the other gang members and shames the people involved into quitting the fighting.

A later version of the Yancy Street Gang was composed of blue-collar criminals who were former dot-com start-ups, ex-Wall Street traders, and failed hedge fund managers. This version of the Yancy Street Gang encountered Ben Grimm and the Human Torch during a period where the Thing briefly reverted to his human form. Despite his lack of physical strength, Ben was still able to send the Gang packing.

Yancy Street was featured when a mysterious figure stealing Christmas decorations led Ben Grimm to the Yancy Street Children's Home. This interrupted Ben Grimm's plan to go a Jewish superhero dinner, but turned out well for the children, who were lacking their own dinner. The heroes shared with the children.

=== Fear Itself ===
During the "Fear Itself" storyline, the physical Yancy Street itself is obliterated by the Thing, who was transformed into Angrir: Breaker of Souls.

=== Personal relations with heroes ===
The physical Yancy Street is later seen in an improved rebuilt condition when its subway system is invaded by slightly violent Killer Folk from the past. The gang was then fended off by the Killer Folk, who took over the street itself. The Killer Folk were later fended off by Moon Girl and Devil Dinosaur. Yancy Street is later the location of an incursion by Omnipotents, a force that eats universes.

The Fantastic Four's move to Yancy Street, plus the intentional influence of super villains, caused the rents to spike. The safety of literally being near the Fantastic Four causes the street to become a more desirable neighborhood. Several members of the Yancy Street Gang are seen when they assist Ben Grimm in fighting the 'Terrible Trio'. This group was threatening the safety and lives of several innocent Yancy Street residents. Ultimately, Reed Richards fixes the housing situation with a device that doubles the amount of apartments without altering the size of the building.

== Members ==
=== Current ===
- "Dictionary" Dawson – The eloquent member of the Yancy Street Gang.
- "Lugwrench" Lubowski
- "Rhythm" Ruiz
- Carlos Hernandez – The Yancy Street Gang's hacker.
- Douglas Ray – The Yancy Street Gang's hacker.
- Jack
- Jason Carter – The Yancy Street Gang's hacker.
- Larry "Little" Lee
- Manny "Smooth" Merengues
- Petey
- Stan
- Tommie "Two-Fisted" Boyd
- Tony

=== Former members ===
- Cee – Member of the Yancy Street Gang. Killed in the crossfire between the Pro-Registration forces and the Anti-Registration forces.
- Daniel Grimm Jr. – The older brother of the Thing, who was heavily involved with the Yancy Street Gang. Killed during a gang war between the Thompson Avenue Gang.

== Other versions ==
=== Spider-Gwen ===
An alternate universe iteration of the Yancy Street Gang from Earth-65 appear in Spider-Gwen, consisting of Hobie Brown and Izzy, among other members. This version of the group support Spider-Woman.

=== Startling Stories ===
An alternate universe iteration of the Yancy Street Gang appear in Startling Stories. They attempt to help the Thing stop a murderous gang of super-powered thugs who took refuge on Yancy Street, only for most of them to be killed.

== In other media ==
=== Television ===
- The Yancy Street Gang appears in Fantastic Four (1967).
- An original incarnation of the Yancy Street Gang appears in Fred and Barney Meet the Thing, consisting of bikers Spike (voiced by Art Metrano), Stretch (voiced by Wayne Morton), and Turkey (voiced by Michael Sheehan).
- The Yancy Street Gang appears in The Incredible Hulk episode "Fantastic Fortitude".

=== Film ===
- A variation of the Yancy Street Gang appears in Fantastic Four (2015). This version is not situated in Yancy Street or even the Lower East Side but is instead located in the suburbs of Oyster, New York with Ben's older brother Jimmy being the leader of the gang and the Grimm family running family business Grimm Salvage over there.

=== Video games ===
- The Yancy Street Gang appears in Ultimate Spider-Man.
- The Yancy Street Gang appears in Fantastic Four (2005). This version of the group is a biker gang.
