= George Stacy =

Fictional Marvel Comics character

- Captain George Stacy as seen in interior artwork for The Amazing Spider-Man #56 (January 1968). Art by John Romita Sr.

Publication information
- Publisher: Marvel Comics
- First appearance: Earth-616 version: The Amazing Spider-Man #56 (January 1968); Earth-65 version: Edge of Spider-Verse #2 (September 2014)
- Created by: Stan Lee (writer); John Romita Sr. (artist)

In-story information
- Team affiliations: New York City Police Department
- Supporting character of: Spider-Man; Spider-Woman

Captain George Stacy is a fictional character appearing in American comic books published by Marvel Comics, primarily in association with Spider-Man. He is Gwen Stacy's father and the police captain from the New York City Police Department. Stacy is a strong supporter of Spider-Man, often defending the superhero when others accuse Spider-Man of criminal acts, and thus serves as a foil personality to another Spider-Man related character, J. Jonah Jameson. Stacy's death in The Amazing Spider-Man #90 (November 1970) has been described as a turning point in the Spider-Man saga, signaling to readers that permanent changes could happen in the story, and that the supporting cast was not safe. Stacy was resurrected in a cloned body by Ben Reilly in Dead No More: The Clone Conspiracy (2016–2017), with the embodiment of Death herself confirming in Ben Reilly: The Scarlet Spider (2017–2018) that all clones Ben created of deceased people had their souls intact on being brought back, before Stacy was killed again by the Carrion virus. The comic book series Spider-Gwen (2015–present) explores an alternate version of George Stacy from Earth-65, where his daughter Gwen became Spider-Woman.

The character has been adapted from the comics into several forms of media, including animated series and feature films. In live-action, the character was played by James Cromwell in the film Spider-Man 3 (2007), by Denis Leary in Marc Webb's The Amazing Spider-Man film duology (2012–2014), and by Shea Whigham in Spider-Man: Across the Spider-Verse (2023) and Spider-Man: Beyond the Spider-Verse (TBA).

== Publication history ==
The Captain George Stacy of Earth-616 first appeared in The Amazing Spider-Man #56 (January 1968), created by writer Stan Lee and artist John Romita Sr., while the Captain George Stacy of Earth-65 first appeared in Edge of Spider-Verse #2 (September 2014), adapted by writer Jason Latour and artist Robbi Rodriguez.

== Fictional character history ==
=== Earth-616 ===
George Stacy is a respected former police member in the NYPD. He is the father of Gwen Stacy, husband of Helen Stacy and the brother of Arthur Stacy. Even in retirement, Stacy kept up with the happenings at the department - and had taken a keen interest in Spider-Man. John Jameson calls Stacy out of retirement to assist in the return of a device called the Nullifier - which could render any electrical or mechanical apparatus inoperative - that Doctor Octopus had tricked an amnesiac Spider-Man into stealing.

After safely securing the weapon, Stacy interviews Peter, believed to have been held captive with Doctor Octopus and Spider-Man. After the interview, Stacy reveals to Peter that he had spent time studying the career of Spider-Man, and that he is glad to have met Peter, known for photographing the wall-crawler on numerous occasions.

Identifying himself as a strong supporter of Spider-Man, Stacy wishes to see the wall-crawler redeemed in the public eye. He also takes an instant liking to Peter, and openly encourages the growing bond between Peter and Gwen. Shortly thereafter at a dance club which employs Mary Jane Watson, Stacy is put under a hypnotic trance through a rigged camera operated by Mary Jane who took photos of him unaware that these actions were aiding Wilson Fisk (aka the Kingpin). Stacy is placed under additional brainwashing by the camera's inventor, Dr. Winkler.

Despite Spider-Man's efforts, George returns programmed to follow the Kingpin's directions and steals police records for the Kingpin while Spider-Man's automatic camera captures the theft. Peter gave the photos to J. Jonah Jameson, hopeful that this apparent betrayal of the Stacy family would help prove George's innocence. While George and Gwen attempt to flee, they are kidnapped by the Kingpin's men and held captive at one of Norman Osborn's labs where Dr. Winkler worked. While Spider-Man battles the Kingpin, Osborn arrives and tackles the Kingpin's henchmen. Though the Kingpin flees and Winkler is apparently killed, the Stacys are rescued. Osborn's testimony to the police exonerates George Stacy.

Stacy begins to suspect Peter and Spider-Man were the same person. After a feverish Peter admits to being Spider-Man before his friends, including Stacy, he asks the Prowler to pose as Spider-Man so Peter and Spider-Man can be seen together. However, this does not fool Stacy.

Called into action one night, Stacy watches Spider-Man battle Doctor Octopus on a rooftop high above the city. As the two battle, chunks of concrete dislodge from the roof and rain on the spectators below. Spotting a child standing under the falling masonry, Stacy shields the boy at the cost of his life.

During the "Dead No More: The Clone Conspiracy" storyline, Ben Reilly resurrects George Stacy along with Gwen to convince the latter to work with him as his business partner at New U Technologies. Doctor Octopus pulls a switch which activates the Carrion virus in all of the clones and causes them to start rapidly decaying, including George and Gwen. George deteriorates in Gwen's arms and tells his daughter to keep Spider-Man safe while she can before dying again.

=== Earth-65 ===
In the Spider-Verse storyline, Earth-65's version of George Stacy ends up in the pursuit of Spider-Woman's arrest following the death of Peter Parker unaware that his daughter Gwen Stacy is Spider-Woman. When George is alone with Spider-Woman following the assassin's defeat with the intent to arrest Spider-Woman. Gwen ends up unmasking which surprises her father. A shocked George tells Gwen to run before he changes his mind.

After the attack, Stacy was relieved from the command of the NYPD's Special Crimes Task Force by Mayor J. Jonah Jameson who feared Stacy would undercut him. George remained in an advisory capacity helping Foggy Nelson and the District Attorney's office until the Vulture would be caught, later arresting Matt Murdock's patsy Kingpin, Wilson Fisk.

In All-New Spider-Gwen, he emigrates to Earth-616 from Earth-65 with his daughter while she attends college, after Gwen uses a Cosmic Cube to make it so that the 616-NYPD think he has always worked there.

== Other versions ==
=== 1602 ===
An alternate universe version of Captain Stacy appears in Spider-Man: 1602. This version is a passenger of the Mayflower and a former member of the Royal Navy.

=== House of M ===
Chief George Stacy in the House of M timeline. Art by Salvador Larocca.

An alternate universe version of George Stacy appears in "Spider-Man: House of M". This version is a former police chief and a personal friend of Peter Parker, though the latter is soured after George discovers Peter's diary and ramblings that allude to his death on Earth-616.

=== Marvel Adventures ===
An alternate universe version of George Stacy is introduced in Marvel Adventures Spider-Man #54 as a main character. This version is younger and has light brown hair. Upon discovering Spider-Man's secret identity, he calls on him for support on some of his cases.

=== Spider-Geddon ===
Two alternate universe versions of George Stacy appear in Spider-Geddon:

- On Earth-91918, George Stacy is a bartender and associate of Spider-Ben.
- On an unidentified Earth, George Stacy acquired Spider-Man's powers, dons a homemade black suit with white stripes, and operates as "The Spider" to secretly aid his fellow police officers in capturing criminals.

=== Spider-Man Noir ===
Spider-Man Noir: The Gwen Stacy Affair introduces an evil alternate version of George Stacy who is a corrupt cop with Nazi sympathies, who is killed by Spider-Man, before Spider-Man is hired by Stacy's daughter Gwen to investigate his death. George is then resurrected as a power-stealing zombie who steals Spider-Man's powers and replaces him as a more criminal Spider-Man Noir, before he is shot, killed, and unmasked by Gwen, who is shocked to learn what she has done.

=== Ultimate Marvel ===
A character based on George Stacy named John Stacy appears in Ultimate Spider-Man (vol. 1). This version is much younger than George, has brown hair, is more athletic, is estranged from his daughter Gwen Stacy, and has a troubled marriage. Additionally, he is not a fan of Spider-Man, but admires his vigilante work. John later sacrifices himself to save a child from a bank robber posing as Spider-Man.

=== Ultimate Universe ===
An alternate universe version of George Stacy appears in Ultimate Spider-Man (vol. 3) #16. This version became Mysterio instead of a police officer before being killed by the Maker's Council.

== In other media ==
=== Television ===
George Stacy as depicted in The Spectacular Spider-Man.

- A character loosely based on George Stacy named Ned Stacy appears in Spider-Man, voiced by Len Carlson. This version is Mary Jane Watson's uncle.
- George Stacy, with elements of his Ultimate Marvel counterpart, appears in The Spectacular Spider-Man, voiced by Clancy Brown.
  - In Spider-Man: Across the Spider-Verse, George is revealed to have been killed sometime after the events of the series.
- George Stacy appears in the Ultimate Spider-Man episode "Return to the Spider-Verse", voiced by Robert Clotworthy.
- George Stacy appears in the Marvel Rising franchise, voiced by Steven Weber.
- George Stacy appears in Spidey and His Amazing Friends, voiced by Scott Porter.

=== Film ===
- George Stacy appears in Spider-Man 3, portrayed by James Cromwell.
- George Stacy appears in The Amazing Spider-Man, portrayed by Denis Leary. This version is younger and does not approve of Spider-Man, considering him to be a menace. He is later killed by the Lizard while helping Spider-Man thwart the former.
  - Hallucinations of George appear in The Amazing Spider-Man 2, portrayed again by Leary.
  - In July 2015, Leary said that he was attached to reprise his role in The Amazing Spider-Man 3, where George would have been resurrected.
- The Earth-65 incarnation of George Stacy makes a non-speaking cameo appearance in Spider-Man: Into the Spider-Verse.
  - The Earth-65 incarnation of George Stacy appears in Spider-Man: Across the Spider-Verse, voiced by Shea Whigham. Additionally, a Spider-Man: India-inspired alternate universe version named Inspector Singh makes a non-speaking cameo appearance.

== See also ==
- List of Spider-Man supporting characters
