= Spider-Woman (Gwen Stacy) =

Marvel Comics superhero

Gwen Stacy Spider-Woman / Ghost-Spider
- Character design by Robbi Rodriguez.

Publication information
- Publisher: Marvel Comics
- First appearance: Edge of Spider-Verse #2 (September 2014)
- Created by: Jason Latour (writer); Robbi Rodriguez (artist); (based upon Spider-Man and Gwen Stacy by Stan Lee and Steve Ditko)

In-story information
- Full name: Gwendolyne "Gwen" Stacy
- Species: Human mutate
- Place of origin: Queens, New York City, U.S. (Earth-65)
- Team affiliations: Spider-Army/Web-Warriors; Spider-Society; Time Variance Authority
- Partnerships: Mary Jane Watson / Carnage; Matt Murdock / Kingpin
- Notable aliases: Spider-Woman, Spider-Gwen, Gwenom, Ghost-Spider
- Abilities: Superhuman strength, speed, agility, equilibrium, reflexes, stamina, and durability; Ability to cling to solid surfaces; Precognitive spider-sense; Skilled martial artist and hand-to-hand combatant; Expert detective; Use of multiverse travel device; Utilizes wrist-mounted web-shooters

Altered in-story information for adaptations to other media
- Partnerships: Miles Morales / Spider-Man; Peter Parker / Spider-Man

Spider-Woman (Gwendolyne Maxine "Gwen" Stacy of Earth-65; colloquially: Spider-Gwen, Gwenom, also known as Ghost-Spider) is a superhero appearing in American comic books published by Marvel Comics. She was created by Jason Latour and Robbi Rodriguez. The character debuted in Edge of Spider-Verse issue #2 as part of the 2014–15 "Spider-Verse" comic book storyline, leading to the ongoing series Spider-Gwen in 2015.

An alternate-universe version of Gwen Stacy from Spider-Man stories, she lives on Earth-65, where she was bitten by a radioactive spider as a teenager and became Spider-Woman, developing some of the classic Spider-Man personality, conflicts, tribulations, powers and abilities. The character's enemies include Earth-65 versions of Matt Murdock, Frank Castle, Cindy Moon, and Susan Storm, her allies including her band the Mary Janes, led by Carnage (Mary Jane Watson), who is in love with Gwen.

Spider-Woman was met with positive reviews from critics, who cited her design—which would become a popular choice for cosplay—and feminist perspective. For promotion, several other versions of the character were developed, accompanied by merchandise. She was featured on animated television series and in video games as a playable character. Dove Cameron voices the character in the 2018–19 Marvel Rising media franchise as "Ghost-Spider", an alias later integrated into the comics; Laura Bailey, Ashley Johnson, Emily Tennant, Catherine Luciani and Allegra Clark have also provided the character's voice in other media. Since 2018, Hailee Steinfeld has voiced Gwen Stacy / Spider-Woman in the Spider-Verse films Into, Across, and Beyond the Spider-Verse, and will star as the character in an in development Spider-Woman spin-off solo film.

== Publication history ==
=== Creation ===
Cover of Spider-Gwen #0 (November 2015) depicting her first appearance design. Art by Robbi Rodriguez.

In the primary continuity of the comic books constituting the Marvel Universe, college-student Gwen Stacy was the girlfriend of Peter Parker, whom she was unaware was Spider-Man. This primary version of Gwen Stacy was killed in The Amazing Spider-Man #121 (June 1973). The concept of an alternate-universe, spider-powered Gwen Stacy was first conceptualized by longtime Spider-Man writer Dan Slott for the "Spider-Verse" story arc. Slott had suggested "Gwen Stacy as a Spider-Woman" to Spider-Man editor Nick Lowe, who then approached Jason Latour to write a series based on that character. Latour was concerned about restoring Gwen Stacy to life in even an alternate-universe form, given the canonical consequences of her death more than 40 years earlier, but eventually conceded, and approached Robbi Rodriguez to design the character. Latour prompted Rodriguez to keep her mysterious and to avoid anything that would prematurely reveal her identity, saying that she "should feel like anyone could be under that mask." The colors of her costume were chosen to homage the colors of the Charlotte Hornets as a nod to Latour's hometown. Slott previously had envisioned a costume based on her clothing in the two-part death story, "The Night Gwen Stacy Died" (1973), except red and blue with web patterns and a half mask. She would also have had a trench coat that would have been red with webs. Slott ultimately approved of Rodriquez' design. The character debuted in Edge of Spider-Verse #2 on September 17, 2014 and is commonly referred to as Spider-Gwen.

Latour's inspiration for creating the character came when he realized that he was not familiar with Gwen Stacy outside of being a "fridged" character who was killed for the sake of the hero as a plot progression. Latour also felt he grew up in times when white males were dominant in superhero comics, and saw Gwen Stacy as a potential hero to represent women in a better way, "The fact that it's a woman does change the meaning and subtext of everything that's going on. As a creator, that's really enjoyable and it opens up the story to go in a lot of directions it wouldn't have gone before."

=== 2010s ===
In October 2014, Nick Lowe announced at New York Comic Con 2014 that the character would be getting her own ongoing series after much demand. The first issue of Spider-Gwen experienced commercial success and was the third best-selling comic of February 2015 with sales of over 250,000 copies. The first volume ended after the fifth issue, with the character carrying over into the second volume of Spider-Verse as part of the Secret Wars event. After the conclusion of the event, a second volume by the same creative team began with the first issue as a part of Marvel's All-New, All-Different Marvel imprint entitled The Radioactive Spider-Gwen. Spider-Gwen was featured as a major character in a multi-part crossover entitled Spider-Women. It commenced with Spider-Women Alpha #1 and ended with Spider-Women Omega #1, with certain issues of Spider-Woman, Silk and Spider-Gwen partially depicting the storyline in between.

Spider-Gwen also stars in a team-up with the alternate Spider-Man-themed characters from the second volume of Spider-Verse in a series titled Web Warriors, a name that was coined by Peter Parker from the Ultimate Spider-Man TV series during the original Spider-Verse. In 2016, the character starred alongside Miles Morales in a crossover storyline titled Sitting in a Tree, where she sees an alternate reality where she gets romantically involved with Miles, although they remain as friends.

Spider-Gwen begins college on Earth-616 at the start of a new series Spider-Gwen: Ghost-Spider written by Seanan McGuire with pencils by Rosi Kämpe and later Takeshi Miyazawa. After 10 issues, the series was relaunched as simply Ghost-Spider, which was cancelled after an additional 10 issues due to dropped sale from dropping of the Spider-Gwen title, and collected as Spider-Gwen: Into the Unknown. The titular Ghost Spider moniker was taken from Stacy's alias in the animated franchise Marvel Rising.

=== 2020s ===
In 2022, a new limited series titled Spider-Gwen – Gwen-Verse by Tim Seeley and Jodi Nishijima was published, featuring Stacy traveling through time alongside alternative versions of herself (modeled after other Marvel heroes) to correct a disruption in the timeline.

In 2023, a new limited series titled Spider-Gwen – Shadow Clones by Emily Kim, Kei Zama, and G. Geoffo was published, featuring Stacy facing clones of herself combined with the powers of various Earth-616 supervillains invading Earth-65.

From 2023 to 2024, a new limited series titled Spider-Gwen – Smash by Melissa Flores and Enid Balam was published, featuring Stacy on tour with her band on Earth-65 as the band's lesbian leader Mary Jane Watson once again becomes Carnage and confesses her love to Gwen.

In July 2024, Marvel announced a new limited series titled TVA by Loki season 2 writer Katharyn Blair following the Marvel Cinematic Universe iteration of the organization (retconned as the same iteration as the comic book version), who after the events of Deadpool & Wolverine, place Gwen into temporary "witness protection" on Earth-616 over the ongoing series Spider-Gwen – The Ghost-Spider, relaunched as All-New Spider-Gwen – Ghost-Spider in 2025.

== Fictional character biography ==
=== Origin ===
In the alternate reality designated Earth-65, Gwen Stacy from Midtown High School is a drummer in a band called the Mary Janes, consisting of her and her friends Mary Jane Watson, Betty Brant, and Glory Grant, who compete with Felicia Hardy and her band the "Black Cats". Bitten by a radioactive spider, Gwen becomes the hero Spider-Woman. Shortly afterward, her classmate and best friend Peter Parker attempts to become a superhero, inventing a serum that turns him into Earth-65's version of the Lizard. Unaware of the reptilian figure's true identity, Gwen fights Peter, eventually dealing him mortal injuries. Peter reverts to human form and dies in her arms; in his last words, he says he wanted to be like her. Spider-Woman is devastated by Peter's death and inspired to use her power to protect others as a way to atone for accidentally killing him. She is blamed for Parker's death publicly by J. Jonah Jameson. Her father, NYPD chief of police George Stacy, hunts for Spider-Woman, aided by his world's Captain Frank Castle and Detective Jean DeWolff. During a confrontation with her father, Gwen reveals her true identity to him. Shocked, he tells her to run.

=== Spider-Verse ===
In the "Spider-Verse" storyline, Gwen of Earth-65 is one of many other Spider-Totems across the multiverse recruited to fight the vampiric Morlun and the Inheritors. Although she is one of several people called Spider-Women who appear, she seems to be the only Spider who is also Gwen Stacy, leading to the nickname "Spider-Gwen." Gwen realizes most of her counterparts in other universes are dead, including the Earth-616 Gwen Stacy who was the first love of Peter Parker, leader of the group fighting the Inheritors. Telling Peter she likewise failed to save her version of him, they both agree to look out for each other. Though Gwen deals with both criminals and enemies in the police department, she also makes allies such as her Earth's versions of Captain America (Samantha Wilson), Reed Richards, and Peggy Carter, the leader of S.H.I.E.L.D.

=== Web Warriors ===
Gwen meets Spider heroes of other worlds again on Battleworld in the Secret Wars storyline. During the crossover storyline Sitting in a Tree, she explores a possible romance with Miles Morales, but they stay as friends. Along with battling menaces on her own world, Gwen joins the Web Warriors, a group of Spiders with dimensional-travel devices who combat threats to other universes, particularly worlds that no longer have a Spider of its own to defend it. During the Dead No More: The Clone Conspiracy storyline, as a Web Warrior, she poses as the reanimated Earth-616 Gwen Stacy (616-Gwen's soul in a clone body) while 616-Gwen is elsewhere to help Peter and Kaine Parker stop a threat involving Jackal's Carrion Virus.

=== Spider-Women ===
Over Spider-Women, Gwen teams up with the Jessica Drew and Cindy Moon of Earth-616 against S.I.L.K. of Earth-65.

=== Gwenom ===
After losing her powers, Gwen seeks aid from the corrupt Matt Murdock (her universe's version of the Kingpin who used Wilson Fisk as his proxy) and scientist Elsa Brock. It's discovered that combining the mutagenic Lizard serum with isotopes can form a version of the Venom symbiote, dubbed "Gwenom". Gwen bonds with Elsa Brock's symbiote, restoring her abilities. When Murdock puts out a hit on her father George, Gwen succumbs to the symbiote's baser influence and almost kills Murdock in revenge. After she spares his life, Murdock reveals he was testing to see if Gwen, like him, would be corrupted by power. After defeating Murdock, Gwen takes full control over the symbiote, reveals her identity to the public, and turns herself over to the authorities for her crimes. After turning down an offer from Captain America to perform black ops services in exchange for reduced sentencing, she is convicted for one year for the manslaughter of Peter Parker (and other offenses) in a maximum security S.H.I.E.L.D. prison. One year later, she is released from prison, and returns to active duty as a public-identity Spider-Woman, now also calling herself Spider-Gwen.

=== Spider-Geddon ===
After serving her prison time, Gwen is informed the Inheritors have returned and joins the "Spider-Geddon" storyline. At one point, she is believed by the others to be killed in an explosion. In truth, she survives the explosion but is stranded on Earth-3109, her dimensional transportation device now damaged. The Gwen of that world, who operates as the heroic Green Goblin, creates a new dimensional teleportation device and Earth-65 Gwen returns to the fight against the Inheritors. During the final battle, Miles Morales wonders if Gwen is a ghost after seeing her lost in an explosion, inspiring the new nickname "Ghost-Spider." and later travels to Earth-90214 after the death of Spider-Man Noir to consult his loved ones while dressed as an airline pilot.

Back on Earth-65, Gwen tries to return to her normal life of superhero activities, drumming with the Mary Janes, and attempting to rekindle her relationships with friend Harry Osborn and her father George. Without her secret identity, things prove challenging, leading to judgments from the public and regular attacks by criminals like the Man-Wolf. Additionally, her symbiote starts causing massive headaches while dropping parts of itself as "gummy spiders." Since Elsa Brock has disappeared from public life, Gwen travels to Earth-616 to find her counterpart Eddie Brock. Peter Parker of Earth-616, now a teacher at Empire State University, volunteers to analyze the symbiote since his world's Eddie Brock is not a scientist. The two heroes then save people from the villain Swarm and Gwen is asked who she is. Since this universe already has a Spider-Woman, Gwen decides she needs a new name. Considering how so many of her multiverse counterparts are dead, as if "Death loves Gwen Stacy," she decides to adopt her "Ghost-Spider" nickname as a new official alias.

=== Ghost-Spider ===
Realizing her secret identity is intact in this dimension, Gwen decides to attend college peacefully on Earth-616 without worrying about villains attacking; with Peter's help, she enrolls in Empire State University, explaining to school admissions that she comes from another dimension. This, along with her test records and Parker vouching for her, earns Gwen enrollment and a scholarship that applies to visitors from other worlds and dimensions. Gwen begins regularly attending classes while "commuting" back and forth from her own Earth, regularly encountering Peter. In costume, she fights menaces on both worlds, including Miles Warren whose unhealthy obsession with the Earth-616 Gwen Stacy led to his becoming the villainous Jackal.

=== Gwenom vs. Carnage ===
While temporarily blackmailed away from Earth-65 to Earth-616 by her reality's incestuous supervillain influencers Susan and Johnny Storm, posing as Doctor Doom, over the "King in Black" storyline, the lesbian Mary Jane Watson of Earth-65 (not-so-secretly in love with Gwen) is also stranded on Earth-616 with her, where she is infected by Knull and becomes Carnage.

=== Gwenverse ===
Returning to Earth-65, a now-existential Gwen ends traveling through time alongside alternative versions of herself (modeled after other Marvel heroes) to correct a disruption in the timeline.

=== Shadow Clones ===
After being attacked by the Earth-616 Sinister Six when they are temporarily displaced to Earth-65, Gwen then finds herself going up against a series of clones of herself with the Six's powers created by a loved one of someone killed during her fight with them, who seeks to wipe out all Gwen Stacys across the multiverse.

=== Smash ===
Going on tour back in Earth-65 with the Mary Janes, Gwen deals with Mary Jane becoming Carnage again, and confessing her love to her.

=== TVA ===
Gwen is put into witness protection by the TVA while dealing with a rogue King Loki, before again temporarily relocating to Earth-616, separated from Mary Jane.

== Powers and abilities ==
Spider-Woman was originally depicted as having similar powers to Spider-Man, which originated from a bite by a radioactive spider. These powers include superhuman speed, agility, enhanced strength that enables her to lift about 10 tons, the ability to adhere to surfaces such as walls, and a precognitive "Spider-Sense" that warns her of danger. She uses web-shooters that were created by retired crime fighter and billionaire mogul Janet van Dyne. The mechanisms help filter moisture from the air to create an adhesive web-fluid, not requiring refilling as long as moisture is present. The fluid can creates web nets, ropes and globs, among other shapes. Spider-Woman has a wristwatch-like device that allows her travel to the multiverse after the events of Spider-Verse. She is commonly depicted as using her smartphone as superhero equipment. As the daughter of a police captain, Spider-Woman has developed detective skills and analytical thinking. She is not trained in fighting, but has picked up elements from kung-fu films.

Gwen is depowered by the Earth-65 version of Cindy Moon, but regains her powers after bonding with her universe's version of the Venom symbiote. Her symbiote feeds off the nutrients of her body but if it does not consume the correct nutrients, Gwen's powers become unstable. To help keep her symbiote stable, Gwen often eats extra food and has made kale chips a regular part of her diet since the symbiote responds well to cellulose.

== Villains ==
- A.I.M. - A criminal organization.
  - M.O.D.A.A.K. – Short for Mental Organism Designed As America's King, M.O.D.A.A.K. is a variation of MODOK created by A.I.M. Latour based this character's appearance and tone on American then-U.S. Presidential candidate Donald Trump.
- The Bodega Bandit – The Bodega Bandit is a petty criminal who was stopped many times by Spider-Woman. He had a dog named Bandito who was later eaten by a Lizard. Spider-Woman made it up to him by giving him a hamster named Pine Cone.
- Dr. Layla Bennett – A scientist who perfected cloning technology with her husband Lee. During a fight between Spider-Woman and the Sinister Six, Lee is killed and Layla swore revenge against Spider-Woman, making numerous Gwen clones themed after her rogues gallery.
- Frank Castle – The Captain of the NYPD's Special Crimes Task Force who succeeds George Stacy as head of the investigation into Spider-Woman, due to George being relieved of duty by Mayor Jameson. Castle is shown to be a cold and brutal individual, with nihilistic tendencies and a one track mind when it comes to dispensing justice.
- Doctorangutan – An intelligent orangutan.
- The Hand - A ninja organization.
  - Matt Murdock / Kingpin – In this reality, Matt Murdock is Wilson Fisk's lawyer who was trained by Stick and later the Hand, serving as the Kingpin of Crime. The cause of his blindness is the same as his Earth-616 counterpart.
  - Rhino – In this reality, Aleksei Sytsevich is a mercenary with gray skin and blue hair who the Kingpin once hired to kill George Stacy. He later became the Rhino upon joining the Hand. After the Rhino beat up George Stacy, Spider-Woman wanted revenge only to find that Captain Frank Castle had beaten her to it when he killed the Rhino.
- The Koala Kommander – The masked koala-weaponizing menace of New York. In hindsight, this character exercised poor judgment in creating living weapons.
- Kraven the Hunter – A hunter enlisted by Frank Castle.
- Peter Parker / Lizard – Peter's life largely mirrors that of his Earth-616 counterpart but he is never bitten by the spider. He was best friends with Gwen Stacy, and was regularly tormented by bullies. As a result of the latter, Peter had begun to develop an inferiority complex and an obsession with Spider-Woman after her emergence, wanting to become "special" like her. He eventually injected himself with a serum that would turn him into the Lizard, and would come into conflict with Spider-Woman. During their fight, Peter fatally suffers under the physical strain of both Spider-Woman's attacks and the serum, resulting in his death and Spider-Woman gaining criminal status, as she was blamed for killing him. Peter's death serves as the main catalyst for much of the challenges Gwen faces over the course of the comic books.
- Harry Osborn / The Green Goblin / Lizard – In this reality, Harry watched his best friend Peter Parker get beaten to death by Spider-Woman. His intense feeling of guilt drives him to join and subsequently betray S.H.I.E.L.D. on his quest to kill Spider-Woman. During the "Radioactive" story arc in the comics, Harry comes back into Gwen's life, and later battles Spider-Woman with a super suit and glider. After Harry injects himself with the Lizard formula, he discovers Spider-Woman is Gwen Stacy and is consumed by anger. Finally, he escapes and is now on the run from S.H.I.E.L.D.
- Wilson Fisk – A mobster who was arrested by George Stacy years ago and is still in prison, but apparently still runs his criminal empire with his lawyer Matt Murdock serving as his proxy as the Kingpin. Murdock is ultimately revealed to be the real Kingpin with Fisk serving as his patsy.
- S.I.L.K. – A terrorist organization that splintered from S.H.I.E.L.D.
  - Cindy Moon – The billionaire head of S.I.L.K.. Cindy's life largely mirrors that of her Earth-616 counterpart, up until the point where a spider that almost bit her was instead killed by a newspaper. At some point, S.H.I.E.L.D. recruited Cindy and she had begun researching spiders. Cindy cured fellow agent Jesse Drew of radiation poisoning, and both later decided to rebel against S.H.I.E.L.D.. In a fight with Captain America, one of the spiders Cindy developed got loose and escaped into the wild, where it would make its way to Gwen Stacy.
  - Jesse Drew – A former S.H.I.E.L.D. Agent and the Earth-65 version of Jessica Drew / Spider-Woman that sided with Cindy Moon after she cured him of his radiation poisoning. As a member of S.I.L.K., Jesse Drew operates as Agent 77.
  - Otto Octavius – A scientist that works for S.I.L.K.
  - Project Green – In this reality, the Super-Adaptoid was known as Project Green.
- Adrian Toomes / the Vulture – An ex-Oscorp employee who targeted police officers. This version secretes a green cloud of gas wherever he goes.
- Susan and Johnny Storm – In this reality, the Storm Twins (modelled after Cersei and Jaime Lannister as respectively portrayed by Lena Headey and Nikolaj Coster-Waldau in Game of Thrones) are former child stars-turned-influencer sitcom leads of the popular television series The Fantastic Four. Secretly sharing an incestuous and manipulative relationship, both siblings publicly go missing on a trip to Latveria while in-fact seducing and manipulating the benevolent Latverian ruler Victor Von Doom over the course of five years into granting them superpowers, before Susan murders him and takes his place as Doctor Doom, converting Latveria to a dictatorship under her command. When the siblings return to New York, they murder their own mother before blackmailing Gwen Stacy into leaving her home reality taking control over the criminal underworld while posing as vigilantes to "stop" crimes they themselves instigated.

== Other versions ==
=== Earth-8 ===
On Earth-8, Spider-Gwen is married to Miles Morales and is the mother of Charlotte and Max Morales-Stacy, both of whom also have Spider Powers.

=== Lost in the Plot ===
During the "Lost in the Plot" arc, an unidentified reality version of Spider-Gwen witnesses Gwenpool defeating the Green Goblin and saves Gwenpool from her death. They later eat pizza together with Peter Parker, Miles Morales, and Cindy Moon.

=== Secret Wars ===
During the 2015 Secret Wars storyline, several versions of Spider-Gwen appear as residents of Battleworld:

- A version of Spider-Woman from Arcadia appears in A-Force.
- In A-Babies vs X-Babies, Spider-Gwen was new to town and went to Iron Man's food truck, where he asked her to go for a date, but she refused. She then took part in the battle between the Avengers, the X-Men, the Guardians of the Galaxy and the Inhumans.

=== Spider-Ham ===
In the universe of Spider-Ham, Spider-Gwen is a penguin known as Guin Stacy the Spider-Guin. She later aids Spider-Ham and Parker Peterman in battling Spider-Ham's various villains.

=== What If? ===
In the alternate Earth-616 storyline of The Night Gwen Stacy Died within What If...? Dark: Spider-Gwen, Spider-Man manages to save Gwen from the Green Goblin at the cost of his life. Gwen dons Peter's costume and works together with Harry to get revenge on the Green Goblin. After murdering the Green Goblin and realising he was his own father, Harry blames Gwen for his death and becomes the new Green Goblin while Gwen vows to Peter to fix her mistakes and honor his legacy by becoming Spider-Woman. Her costume is a modified version of Peter's Spider-Man outfit along with the green hooded coat she wore the night Peter died. Despite lacking powers, she is able to use Peter's web shooters and develops other technology such as web bombs.

== Characteristics ==
Gwen Stacy's Spider-Woman is depicted as harboring much of Earth-616 Peter Parker's conflicts and tribulations, such as receiving negative media attention of herself and having the conflict of being a superhero over her normal life of a band member. Critical commentary noted her as a sarcastic, wisecracking hero when fighting criminals and supervillains. Spider-Gwen (Vol. 2) #1's summary of the character reveals that she originally used her powers for attention. After advice expressed to Gwen Stacy by her father that Spider-Woman could use her powers for good purposes, she was motivated to stop bullying, which Peter Parker in Earth-65 was a victim of. Spider-Woman eventually became an idol to Peter and he experimented on himself to become a superhero like her, leading to his demise. Gwen Stacy was branded a criminal after Peter's death, having been blamed for killing him. Jesse Schedeen of IGN felt that this aspect was the most intriguing change of her story, "[Peter Parker becomes] both Gwen's first major villain and the defining, Uncle-Ben-style tragedy in her life." Evan Narcisse from Kotaku explained that it was a role reversal that felt "enriching" to what the creators intended to do, which gave Gwen Stacy "a reason to live". After saving her father's life and revealing her identity to him, she vows to use her powers to stop crime. Captain Stacy is then depicted as choosing his daughter over his job. Meagan Damore of Comic Book Resources opined that even though Captain Stacy is no Uncle Ben, he fills the wise mentor role for Gwen very well.

== Reception ==
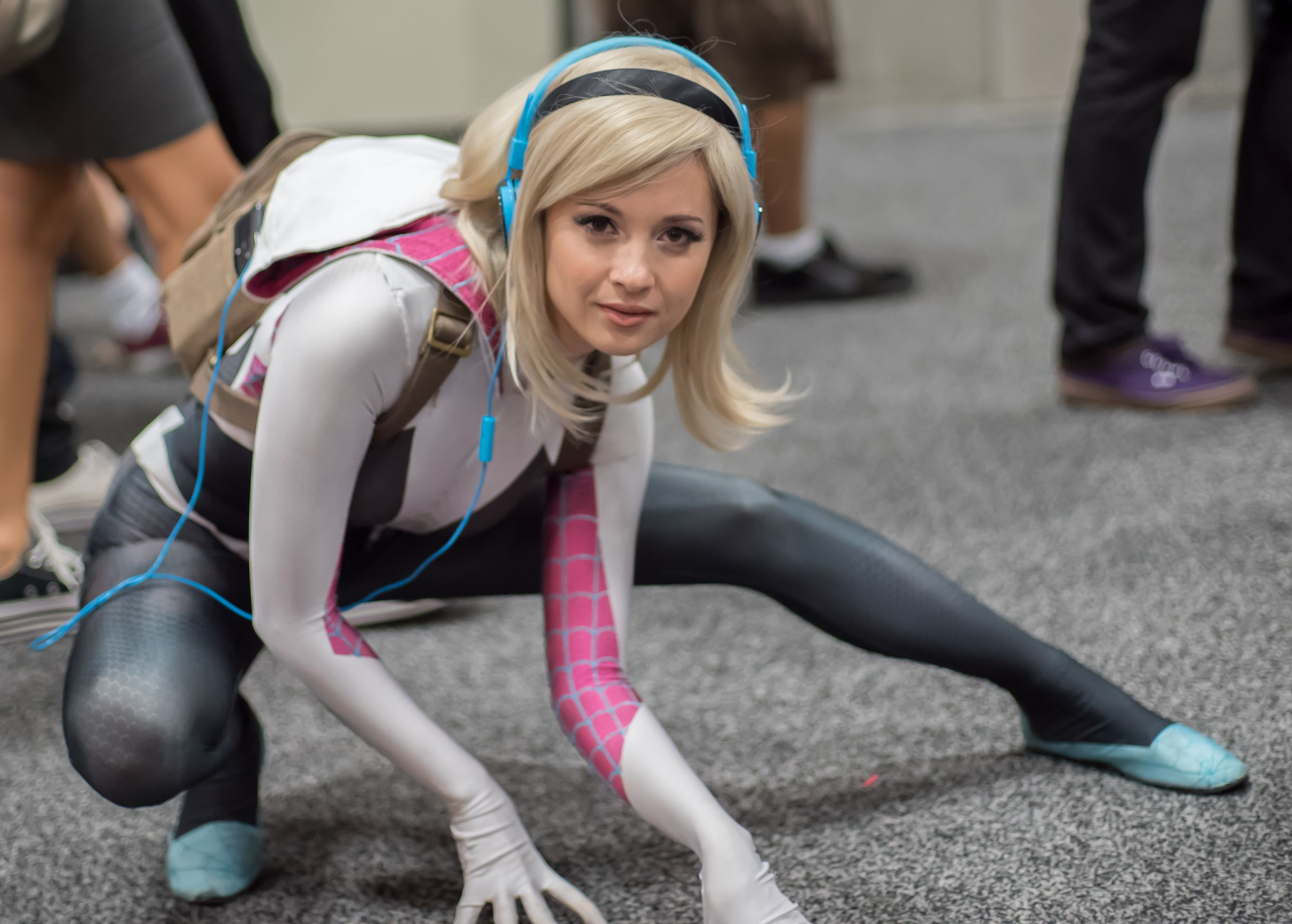
A cosplayer of Gwen Stacy's Spider-Woman at 2015 San Diego Comic-Con. Since her debut in 2014, the character has been a popular cosplay choice.

Gwen Stacy's Spider-Woman has been received positively from reviewers. Her design is a popular choice for cosplay and fan art. Evan Narcisse of Kotaku called the costume design "is one of the best riffs on the Spider-Man motifs in decades." Andrew Wheeler from ComicsAlliance felt that even though Gwen Stacy should have stayed dead, the costume inspired him to want her back. He also cited it as a potential favorite superhero costume in years. The creative director of Marvel Games, Bill Rosemann, described Gwen Stacy as "one of the greatest modern superhero designs." IGN's Jesse Schedeen, reviewing the first Spider-Gwen issue, said that the character never came across as merely just a female variant of Peter Parker and was also distinct from Jessica Drew, Julia Carpenter, Mayday Parker, Anya Corazon, and other female-themed Spider costume characters. Jessie Schedeen said that Gwen had "her own set of hang-ups and her own brand of humor". Doug Zawisza, writing for Comic Book Resources, described Gwen Stacy as "likeable and humorous, conflicted but determined and quick with a zinger", adding, "Latour gives Gwen real world problems as well as superheroic ones. She has family problems and perception problems."

The character has drawn critical attention on a feminist perspective. Aja Romano of The Daily Dot felt that the new take on Gwen Stacy was a fresh one on its original version due to a common trope of women dying for the sake of men's angst. She praised the fact that instead of taking the role of a superhero's girlfriend, Latour designed her as a "fully formed person." Entertainment Weekly's Joshua Rivera felt that "Spider-Gwen succeeds because it isn't a superficial inversion, but an examination of what makes Spider-Man an important character." Gwen Stacy's Spider-Woman was number seven in Newsarama's list of the best Spider-Men. Ryan Lynch of Screen Rant called her the second-greatest alternate version of Spider-Man, saying that her stories were "a unique take on the Spider-mythos that provided unique stories based on fleshed out characters with clever writing." Chris Sims from ComicsAlliance ranked her as the second-best alternate take on Spider-Man. Mark Ginocchio, writing for ComicBook.com, said the character's debut was the fourth-best alternate Spider-Man story, and that, even though Gwen Stacy was a new character, she was on her way to establishing herself as one of the most popular superheroes of Marvel.

In 2022, Screen Rant included Gwen Stacy / Spider-Gwen in their "10 Female Marvel Heroes That Should Come To The MCU" list.

== In other media ==
=== Television ===
- Spider-Gwen appears in the Ultimate Spider-Man episode "Return to the Spider-Verse" Pt. 4, voiced by Dove Cameron. After Miles Morales vanished from her universe, Gwen Stacy allied with her universe's May Parker to become Spider-Woman and combat the chaos that befell her city using technology to mimic Morales' spider powers. Morales chooses Stacy to replace him as a spider-hero as he and his family move to Peter Parker's universe.
- Spider-Gwen / Ghost-Spider appears in Marvel's Spider-Man, voiced by Laura Bailey. This version is one of Peter Parker's classmates at Horizon High, as well as best friends with Anya Corazon, who specializes in DNA formulas after she was inspired by her uncle Raymond Warren to pursue science. Later in the series, she develops spider powers after being exposed to Warren's chemicals.
- Spider-Gwen appears in Marvel Super Hero Adventures, voiced by Emily Tennant.
- Ghost-Spider appears in the Marvel Rising animated media franchise, voiced again by Dove Cameron. While this version is primarily based on Stacy, she uses an alias that originated in the comics as a Ghost Rider variant of Spider-Man and has the partially dyed pink hair of Gwen Poole in her civilian identity. This redesign was cited by a Marvel Rising character designer, who mistook an image of Gwen Poole by Gurihiru for Gwen Stacy while using Google Images to reference the former character's physical appearance during the series' development. The "Ghost-Spider" alias was later integrated into Marvel Comics and related animated Spider-Man media to distinguish the character from other Spider-Women.
  - Stacy first appears in the Initiation shorts, in which she goes on the run from the police after she is blamed for the death of her Inhuman friend, Kevin. Eventually, S.H.I.E.L.D. agent Daisy Johnson finds similar reports of the suspect in question and gives the information to Ghost-Spider.
  - Ghost-Spider returns in the TV special "Chasing Ghosts", in which she tracks down Sheath, a female Inhuman responsible for Kevin's death, and works with the Secret Warriors to stop her before eventually joining the team.
- Ghost-Spider appears in Lego Marvel Spider-Man: Vexed by Venom, voiced again by Laura Bailey. This version's design and portrayal is a combination of her counterparts from Marvel's Spider-Man and Marvel Rising.
- Ghost-Spider appears in Spidey and His Amazing Friends, voiced by Lily Sanfelippo in season one and two and by Audrey Bennett from season three onward. Like the Marvel Rising incarnation, this version has Gwen Poole's partially dyed pink highlights.
- Spider-Gwen appears in the Disney+ special Lego Marvel Avengers: Mission Demolition, voiced again by Lily Sanfelippo.
- Spider-Gwen will appear in the upcoming second season of Your Friendly Neighborhood Spider-Man.

=== Film ===
Gwen Stacy / Spider-Woman as depicted in the Spider-Verse films

Gwen Stacy / Spider-Woman appears in Sony's Spider-Verse film franchise, voiced by Hailee Steinfeld. This version has operated as Spider-Woman for two years, saved her father George Stacy, but failed to save her friend Peter Parker after he became the Lizard. She first appears in Spider-Man: Into the Spider-Verse (2018) before returning in Spider-Man: Across the Spider-Verse (2023). Additionally, she will appear in the upcoming Spider-Man: Beyond the Spider-Verse (2027) and Spider-Woman, a female-centered spin-off film.

=== Video games ===
- Spider-Gwen appears as an unlockable playable character in:
  - Marvel: Contest of Champions.
  - Marvel: Avengers Alliance.
  - Marvel Heroes, voiced by Ashley Johnson.
  - Marvel Future Fight.
  - Marvel Puzzle Quest.
  - Marvel Avengers Academy, voiced by Catherine Luciani.
  - Lego Marvel Super Heroes 2, voiced by Melli Bond.
- Spider-Gwen and Gwenom appear as separate unlockable playable characters in Spider-Man Unlimited, voiced again by Laura Bailey.
- Spider-Gwen appears as a playable character in Marvel Ultimate Alliance 3: The Black Order, voiced by Allegra Clark.
- Spider-Gwen's suit, based on her appearance in Spider-Man: Across the Spider-Verse, appears as an outfit in Fortnite.

== Legacy ==
The character inspired 20 Marvel variant covers of Gwen Stacy being a wide array of Marvel heroes (and one for the Image Comics series Invincible and its title character), one of such hybrids inspiring the character Gwen Poole. A rock band named Married With Sea Monsters drew inspiration from Spider-Woman for their track "Face It Tiger", which was based on a song sung by Spider-Gwen's fictional band The Mary Janes. The character's popularity has spawned merchandise, including shirts and action figures of the superhero. Figures have been sold to companies such as Diamond Comic Distributors and Hasbro, among others. In addition, Funko released bobblehead figures of the character, while in Australia, Harley Davidson has teamed up with Marvel to create custom hero-themed motorcycles including a design based on Spider-Gwen.
