= Southern Bastards =

2014 ongoing comic book series

- Cover for Southern Bastards #1. Art by Jason Latour.

Publication information
- Publisher: Image Comics
- Format: Ongoing series
- Publication date: 2014–2018
- No. of issues: 21

Creative team
- Created by: Jason Aaron; Jason Latour
- Written by: Jason Aaron; Jason Latour (#12, #18)
- Artist(s): Jason Latour; Chris Brunner (#12, #18)
- Letterer: Jared K. Fletcher
- Editor: Sebastian Girner

Collected editions
- Here was a Man: ISBN 9781632150165
- Gridiron: ISBN 9781632152695
- Homecoming: ISBN 9781632156105
- Gut Check: ISBN 9781534301948

Southern Bastards is a comic book series created in 2014 by Jason Aaron and Jason Latour, and published by Image Comics. The series revolves around the culture in a small town in the American South where football is everything and people try to get away with crime. The series won the 2015 Harvey Award for Best New Series and the 2016 Eisner Award for Best Continuing Series.

== Publication history ==
Two Southerners, writer Jason Aaron from Alabama and writer-artist Jason Latour from North Carolina, wanted to write a love letter/hate rant to the South so they created the Southern-focused series.

== Story ==
Craw County, Alabama is home of Boss BBQ and the state football champion, the Runnin' Rebs – most residents adore high school football. Coach Euless Boss is the high school football coach with no more room in his office for trophies and is a crime lord that buries bodies underneath the bleachers. The former sheriff's son Earl Tubb is an angry man who has grievances with Coach Boss over how his father died.

Coach Boss holds power over Craw County for one reason – he wins football games. But, after the ugliest loss of his career, the coach must become more of a criminal to keep ahead of his enemies, including new enemies like Roberta Tubb, who's come to town with a machine gun and her own questions about how her father died.

== Reception ==
Southern Bastards has received generally positive reviews. The review aggregation website Comic Book Roundup reports that the series has an average score of 9.0 out of 10.

The series is the 2015 Harvey Award winner for Best New Series) and the 2016 Eisner Award winner for Best Continuing Series.

The series paused in 2020 when Latour took a leave of absence in light of misconduct allegations.

=== Awards ===
| Year | Award | Category | Nominee | Result | Ref. |
|---|---|---|---|---|---|
| 2015 | Harvey Awards | Best New Series | Southern Bastards | Won | |
| 2015 | Eisner Awards | Best Continuing Series | Jason Aaron and Jason Latour | Nominated | |
| 2015 | Eisner Awards | Best Writer | Jason Aaron | Nominated | |
| 2016 | Eisner Awards | Best Continuing Series | Jason Aaron and Jason Latour | Won | |
| 2016 | Eisner Awards | Best Writer | Jason Aaron | Won | |

== Issues ==
| Issue | Arc | Release date | Story | Art | Cover |
|---|---|---|---|---|---|
| #1 | Here was a Man | April 30, 2014 | Jason Aaron | Jason Latour | Jason Latour ᴠᴀʀɪᴀɴᴛs Jason Latour; R.M. Guéra; James Harren; Chris Bunner & Rico Renzi |
| #2 | Here was a Man | May 28, 2014 | Jason Aaron | Jason Latour | Jason Latour |
| #3 | Here was a Man | July 2, 2014 | Jason Aaron | Jason Latour | Jason Latour |
| #4 | Here was a Man | September 3, 2014 | Jason Aaron | Jason Latour | Jason Latour |
| #5 | Gridiron | October 29, 2014 | Jason Aaron | Jason Latour | Jason Latour ᴠᴀʀɪᴀɴᴛ Andrew Robinson |
| #6 | Gridiron | December 10, 2014 | Jason Aaron | Jason Latour | Jason Latour |
| #7 | Gridiron | February 11, 2015 | Jason Aaron | Jason Latour | Jason Latour |
| #8 | Gridiron | April 1, 2015 | Jason Aaron | Jason Latour | Jason Latour |
| #9 | Homecoming | June 17, 2015 | Jason Aaron | Jason Latour | Jason Latour ᴠᴀʀɪᴀɴᴛ Tony Moore |
| #10 | Homecoming | July 29, 2015 | Jason Aaron | Jason Latour | Jason Latour |
| #11 | Homecoming | October 7, 2015 | Jason Aaron | Jason Latour | Jason Latour |
| #12 | Homecoming | November 11, 2015 | Jason Latour | Chris Brunner | Jason Latour |
| #13 | Homecoming | January 27, 2016 | Jason Aaron | Jason Latour | Jason Latour |
| #14 | Homecoming | May 11, 2016 | Jason Aaron | Jason Latour | Jason Latour |
| #15 | Gut Check | November 2, 2016 | Jason Aaron | Jason Latour | Jason Latour ᴠᴀʀɪᴀɴᴛ Becky Cloonan |
| #16 | Gut Check | January 11, 2017 | Jason Aaron | Jason Latour | Jason Latour ᴠᴀʀɪᴀɴᴛ Babs Tarr |
| #17 | Gut Check | August 16, 2017 | Jason Aaron | Jason Latour | Jason Latour ᴠᴀʀɪᴀɴᴛ Cliff Chiang |
| #18 | Gut Check | September 27, 2017 | Jason Latour | Jason Latour; Chris Brunner | Jason Latour |
| #19 | Gut Check | January 24, 2018 | Jason Aaron | Jason Latour | Jason Latour ᴠᴀʀɪᴀɴᴛ Babs Tarr |
| #20 | Gut Check | May 9, 2018 | Jason Aaron | Jason Latour | Jason Latour ᴠᴀʀɪᴀɴᴛ Jamie McKelvie |
| #21 | Rebs | | Jason Latour | | |

== Collected editions ==
=== Trade paperbacks ===
| Volume | Title | Release date | Material collected | ISBN |
|---|---|---|---|---|
| 1 | Here Was a Man | October 1, 2014 | Southern Bastards #1–4 | 9781632150165 |
| 2 | Gridiron | May 6, 2015 | Southern Bastards #5–8 | 9781632152695 |
| 3 | Homecoming | July 13, 2016 | Southern Bastards #9–14 | 9781632156105 |
| 4 | Gut Check | May 23, 2018 | Southern Bastards #15–20 | 9781534301948 |

=== Premiere hardcovers ===
| Book # | Release date | Material collected | ISBN |
|---|---|---|---|
| Book One | September 30, 2015 | Southern Bastards #1–8 | 9781632154446 |
| Book Two | January 11, 2022 | Southern Bastards #9–20 | 9781534303263 |

== Adaptation ==
In October 2025, it was announced that Hulu ordered a pilot based on the comic book series, with Matt Olmstead serving as showrunner. Bill Dubuque wrote the teleplay, in addition to sharing a co-story credit with Nia DaCosta, who was set to direct the pilot. In April 2026, it was announced that Kevin Bacon had been cast in a leading role while Reinaldo Marcus Green would replace DaCosta as director.
