= Spider-Gwen =

American comic book series

- Cover of Spider-Gwen #1 (February 2015) by Robbi Rodriguez

Publication information
- Publisher: Marvel Comics
- Schedule: Monthly
- Format: Ongoing series
- Genre: Superhero
- Publication date: Spider-Gwen: Vol. 1: Most Wanted? (vol. 1); 5 issues Feb.–June 2015; Spider-Gwen Vol. 2; 34 issues and 1 Annual; Oct. 2015 – July 2018; Spider-Gwen Vol. 3: Ghost-Spider; 10 issues Oct. 2018 – July 2019; Spider-Gwen Vol. 4: Into the Unknown; 10+ issues and 1 Annual; Aug. 2019 – June 2020; Spider-Gwen Vol. 5: Gwenom vs. Carnage; 3 issues January–March 2021; Spider-Gwen Vol. 6: Gwenverse; 5 issues March–August 2022; Spider-Gwen Vol. 7: Shadow Clones; 5 issues March–July 2023; Spider-Gwen Vol. 8: Smash; 5 issues December 2023 – February 2024; Spider-Gwen Vol. 9: The Ghost-Spider; 15 issues May 2024 – July 2025
- Main character(s): Spider-Woman (Gwen Stacy); The Kingpin (Matt Murdock); Carnage (Mary Jane Watson)

Creative team
- Created by: Jason Latour; Robbi Rodriguez
- Written by: Jason Latour (vol. 1–2); Seanan McGuire (vol. 3–5); Tim Seeley (vol. 6); Emily Kim (vol. 7); Melissa Flores (vol. 8); Stephanie Phillips (vol. 9–10)
- Artist(s): Robbi Rodriguez (vol. 1–2); Takeshi Miyazawa (vol. 3–5); Rosi Kämpe (vol. 3–5); Jodi Nishijima (vol. 6); Kei Zama (vol. 7); Enid Balam (vol. 8); Paolo Villanelli (vol. 9–10)
- Colorist: Rico Renzi

Collected editions
- Most Wanted?: ISBN 978-078519-7737
- Greater Power: ISBN 978-078519-9595
- Spider-Women: ISBN 978-130290-0939
- Edge of Spider-Verse: ISBN 978-130294-9983
- Weapon of Choice: ISBN 978-078519-9601
- Long Distance: ISBN 978-130290-3107
- Sitting in a Tree: ISBN 978-130290-7624
- Predators: ISBN 978-130290-5965
- Gwenom: ISBN 978-130290-7648
- The Life of Gwen Stacy: ISBN 978-13029-11928
- Gwen Stacy: ISBN 978-130291-9863
- Amazing Powers: ISBN 978-130292-3723
- Deal With The Devil: ISBN 978-130293-1650
- Unmasked: ISBN 978-130294-5251

Spider-Gwen (also titled Radioactive Spider-Gwen, Ghost-Spider, and Gwenom) is an ongoing comic book series published by Marvel Comics that began in February 2015. The series revolves around Gwen Stacy of Earth-65, an alternate universe version of Gwen Stacy that debuted in Edge of Spider-Verse #2 as part of the 2014–2015 Spider-Man storyline "Spider-Verse". Spider-Gwen explores a universe where Gwen Stacy was bitten by the radioactive spider instead of Peter Parker, leading her to a career as the Spider-Woman of her world.

== Publication history ==
A spider-powered Gwen Stacy was first envisioned by longtime Spider-Man writer Dan Slott for the 2014–15 "Spider-Verse" storyline. However, his initial concept was very different from what was published, which was mainly the work of Spider-Gwen creators Jason Latour and Robbi Rodriguez.

In October, Nick Lowe announced at New York Comic Con 2014 that the fan-favorite Spider-Gwen who was introduced in "Spider-Verse" would be getting her own series after much demand.

The first volume ended after the fifth issue with the character carrying over into the second volume of Spider-Verse as part of the "Secret Wars" storyline. After the conclusion of that storyline, a second volume by the same creative team began with issue #1 as a part of Marvel's All-New, All-Different Marvel imprint.

Following the departure of Latour and Rodriguez, Marvel launched a new series titled Spider-Gwen: Ghost-Spider, written by Seanan McGuire with pencils by Rosi Kämpe, and later Takeshi Miyazawa. After 10 issues, the series was relaunched as simply Ghost-Spider, which ended after an additional 10 issues. Under this creative team, stories featured Gwen Stacy traveling back and forth between her home dimension, in which her identity was publicly known, and Earth-616, in which she attends college.

In 2022, a new limited series titled Spider-Gwen: Gwen-Verse by Tim Seeley and Jodi Nishijima was published, featuring Stacy traveling through time alongside alternative versions of herself (modeled after other Marvel heroes) to correct a disruption in the timeline.

== Story ==
=== Before Spider-Gwen ===
Before the beginning of Spider-Gwen, high school student Gwen Stacy was bitten by a radioactive spider. This granted her all of the quintessential Spider-Man powers, and Stacy began her career as Spider-Woman. In her regular life, she begins a relationship with Peter Parker, forms a friend group with Parker, and ostracizes new student Harry Osborn, who is later revealed to have had a crush on her. Meanwhile, Peter becomes infatuated with Spider-Woman without knowing that she is Stacy. The bullied Peter's suffering worsens, and eventually, he creates a formula that turns him into a lizard mutant.

On prom night, after he is being bullied yet again, he injects himself with the formula and transforms, going psycho. Gwen Stacy dons her Spider-Woman costume and fights Peter, defeating and accidentally killing him. Peter regresses to his human form in Gwen's arms, telling her he just wanted to "be special" like her and prompting her to realize what she has done. She runs from the scene, creating the public misconception that Spider-Woman has murdered Peter Parker and is a menace to society and setting up the Spider-Gwen series.

=== Volume 0 ===
Before the "Spider-Verse" storyline that introduced Spider-Gwen, Stacy's father George Stacy was ordered as captain of the NYPD to hunt down and detain Spider-Woman, considered a public menace. Captain Stacy—unaware of Spider-Gwen's secret identity—is more than happy to do so. Upon hearing about this, the Kingpin, one of New York's most prominent crime bosses, decides to ally himself with Spider-Gwen—for reasons unexplained—and apparently has his lawyer Matt Murdock (Daredevil on Earth-616, the main Marvel universe) send the assassin Aleksei Sytsevich to kill Captain Stacy. Gwen arrives and saves her father, who corners her at gunpoint. To avoid getting shot, she reveals to her father that she is Spider-Woman.

After the "Spider-Verse" storyine, Gwen goes back to her ordinary life of bumming around by day and Spider-Woman-ing by night. Her father passes the Spider-Woman investigation on to Detective Frank Castle. Suddenly, the villainous Vulture appears, secretly working for the Kingpin, and causes trouble for Gwen (Spider-Ham appears for a short time as a hallucination because of an attack). Gwen defeats the Vulture and in the end, he is put away, Murdock continuing to influence him from behind bars. Frank Castle increases his efforts against Spider-Woman, becoming more and more ruthless. Castle eventually makes the connection with Spider-Woman's identity and enlists the help of Kraven the Hunter to perform a siege on the Stacy house. Castle and Kraven brutally beat down Gwen after she gets her father to safety. The volume concludes when Gwen decides to take a stand against Castle and not run any longer, blindsiding him as he unmasks her while trying to get away.

=== Volume 1 ===
Gwen is unsure of how secure her secret identity is as she hides from her father and awaits the recollection of Frank Castle. Her problems are put to the side when a Lizard appears on the streets, seemingly having taken something similar to Peter Parker's formula. The dog of Spider-Gwen's "arch-nemesis", the Bodega Bandit, is eaten by the Lizard. Tracking the Lizard into the sewer, Spider-Woman encounters a pack of Lizard-Men. Earth 65's Captain America, Samantha Wilson, shows up to capture the Lizards and Spider-Gwen as well. Gwen battles the Captain while avoiding the Lizards. Gwen saves CA from the Lizards and they part ways on good terms. After a quick chat with Jessica Drew of Earth-616, Gwen and the Mary Janes go on a camping trip where Harry Osborn makes a surprise appearance. He explains his connection with S.H.I.E.L.D. and his motive to go after Spider-Woman. He appears nights later in a green mechanical suit accompanied by an army of orange robots to kill Spider-Woman. After an issue-long battle, Harry sets off an explosion to even the playing field. As Gwen lies on the floor, Harry drinks a vial of the Lizard formula and unmasks her to his surprise. After an issue break from the fight, involving a story line of George Stacy conversing with Matt Murdock, Gwen resumes her fight with a now-mutated Harry Osborn with the assistance of Captain America. Gwen eventually convinces Harry that he is in the wrong and allows him to run from S.H.I.E.L.D. Gwen reconciles with her father in the end and he quits his job.

=== Volume 2 ===
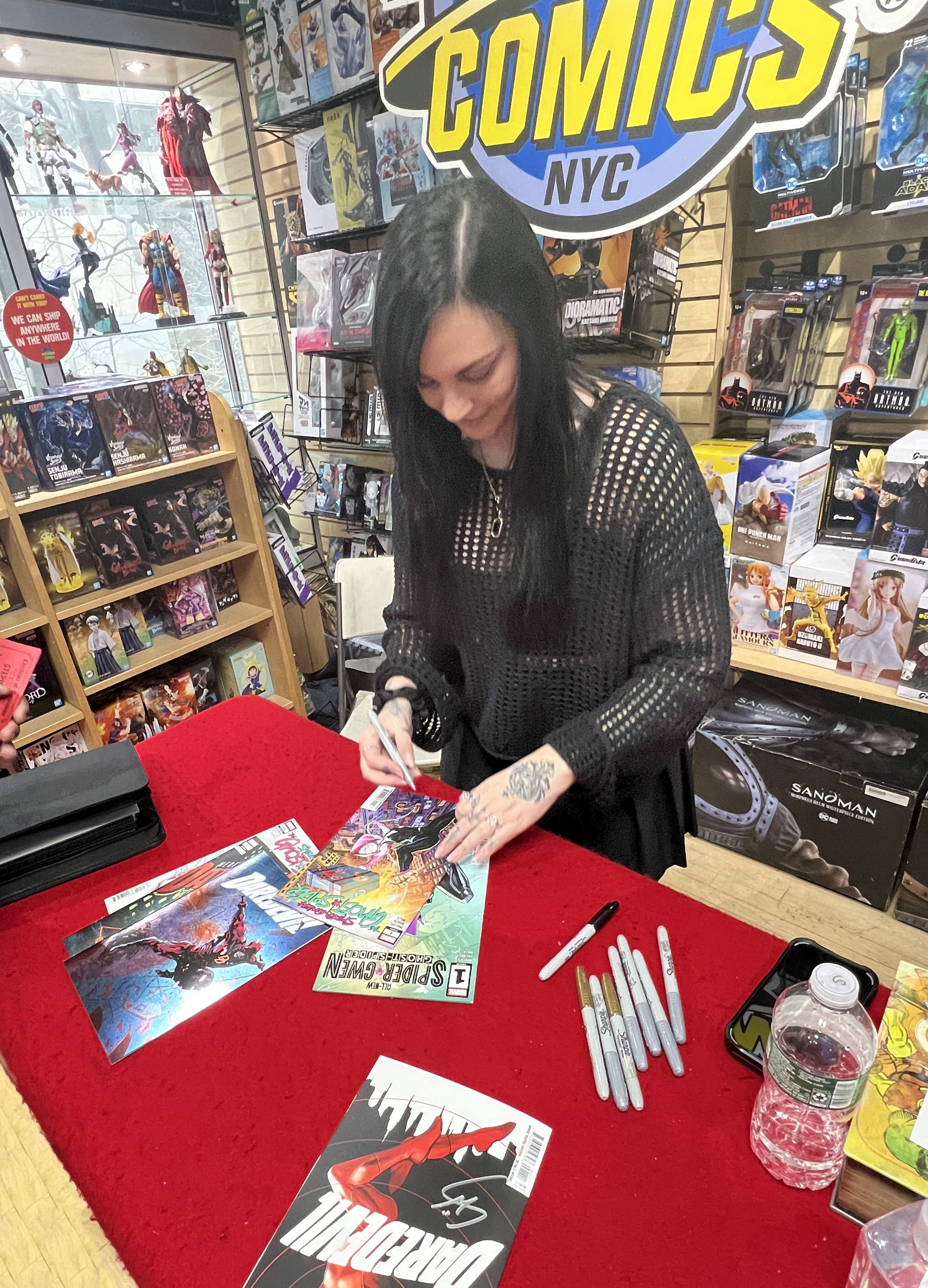
Writer Stephanie Phillips autographing copies of Spider-Gwen: Ghost Spider at an April 2026 signing at Midtown Comics in Manhattan

Following the events of the 2016 "Spider-Women" storyline, Gwen is left limited to seven temporary uses of her powers, which she can activate through a device on her wrist. She attends a rock concert with her friends, then visits the recently reconstructed Dollar Dog. While there, she is attacked by Frank Castle, and left with no other choice, uses one of her power-ups to take him down, before fleeing the scene, and spending the night at her father's place. The next day, Gwen and her father are attacked by Kraven the Hunter and Frank Castle. During the fight, Gwen's device is damaged by Kraven, and although she and her father escape, Frank Castle makes off with one of her six remaining power-ups.

After having her device repaired by Earth 65's Reed Richards, Gwen suits up and prepares to go after Frank Castle. In an intense fight, Frank Castle manages to escape, and after coming to her aid, Gwen's father turns himself in for assisting Spider-Woman. Two weeks later, Gwen is approached by Matt Murdock, Earth 65's Kingpin, who she makes a deal with. He will defend her dad in court as a lawyer, but in return, Spider-Woman will work for him. To celebrate halloween, and get her mind off her problems, Gwen and her friends go trick-or treating, and explore an abandoned carnival. Here, Gwen is confronted by a zombified Peter Parker, calling her out on her failures. However, this is revealed to be a hallucination caused by a strange gas.

== Characters ==
- Gwen Stacy / Spider-Woman / Spider-Gwen / Ghost-Spider – A variation of Gwen Stacy that was bitten by the radioactive spider that turned Peter Parker into Spider-Man. Following Spider-Verse, Gwen continues dealing with the aftermath of Peter's death after his attack as the Lizard, feeling guilt for Peter's death whilst being branded by the public as his murderer.
- George Stacy – The Captain of the NYPD who is Gwen's father. Following Peter's death, George is made head of the task force to arrest Spider-Woman. However, after Spider-Woman saved him from the Rhino and revealed herself to be none other than Gwen, George tries to help and protect her however possible.

=== Villains ===
- A.I.M. - A criminal organization.
  - M.O.D.A.A.K. – Short for Mental Organism Designed As America's King, M.O.D.A.A.K. is a variation of MODOK created by A.I.M. Latour based this character's appearance and tone on American then-U.S. presidential candidate Donald Trump.
- The Bodega Bandit – The Bodega Bandit is a petty criminal who was stopped many times by Spider-Woman. He had a dog named Bandito who was later eaten by a Lizard. Spider-Woman made it up to him by giving him a hamster named Pine Cone.
- Frank Castle – The Captain of the NYPD's Special Crimes Task Force who succeeds George Stacy as head of the investigation into Spider-Woman, due to George being relieved of duty by Mayor Jameson. Castle is shown to be a cold and brutal individual, with nihilistic tendencies and a one track mind when it comes to dispensing justice.
- Doctorangutan – An intelligent orangutan.
- The Hand - A ninja organization.
  - Matt Murdock / Kingpin – In this reality, Matt Murdock is Wilson Fisk's lawyer who was trained by Stick and later the Hand, serving as the Kingpin of Crime. The cause of his blindness is the same as his Earth-616 counterpart.
  - The Rhino – In this reality, Aleksei Sytsevich is a mercenary with gray skin and blue hair who the Kingpin once hired to kill George Stacy. He later became the Rhino upon joining the Hand. After the Rhino beat up George Stacy, Spider-Woman wanted revenge only to find that Captain Frank Castle had beaten her to it when he killed the Rhino.
- The Koala Kommander – The masked koala-weaponizing menace of New York. In hindsight, this character exercised poor judgment in creating living weapons.
- Kraven the Hunter – A hunter enlisted by Frank Castle.
- Peter Parker / The Lizard – Peter's life largely mirrors that of his Earth-616 counterpart but he is never bitten by the spider. He was best friends with Gwen Stacy, and was regularly tormented by bullies. As a result of the latter, Peter had begun to develop an inferiority complex and an obsession with Spider-Woman after her emergence, wanting to become "special" like her. He eventually injected himself with a serum that would turn him into the Lizard, and would come into conflict with Spider-Woman. During their fight, Peter fatally suffers under the physical strain of both Spider-Woman's attacks and the serum, resulting in his death and Spider-Woman gaining criminal status, as she was blamed for killing him. Peter's death serves as the main catalyst for much of the challenges Gwen faces over the course of the comic books.
- Harry Osborn / The Green Goblin / The Lizard – In this reality, Harry watched his best friend Peter Parker get beaten to death by Spider-Woman. His intense feeling of guilt drives him to join and subsequently betray S.H.I.E.L.D. on his quest to kill Spider-Woman. During the "Radioactive" story arc in the comics, Harry comes back into Gwen's life, and later battles Spider-Woman with a super suit and glider. After Harry injects himself with the Lizard formula, he discovers Spider-Woman is Gwen Stacy and is consumed by anger. Finally, he escapes and is now on the run from S.H.I.E.L.D.
- Wilson Fisk – A mobster who was arrested by George Stacy years ago and is still in prison, but apparently still runs his criminal empire with his lawyer, Matt Murdock, serving as his proxy as the Kingpin. Murdock is ultimately revealed to be the real Kingpin, with Fisk serving as his patsy.
- S.I.L.K. – A terrorist organization that splintered from S.H.I.E.L.D.
  - Cindy Moon – The billionaire head of S.I.L.K.. Cindy's life largely mirrors that of her Earth-616 counterpart, up until the point where a spider that almost bit her was instead killed by a newspaper. At some point, S.H.I.E.L.D. recruited Cindy and she had begun researching spiders. Cindy cured fellow agent Jesse Drew of radiation poisoning, and both later decided to rebel against S.H.I.E.L.D.. In a fight with Captain America, one of the spiders Cindy developed got loose and escaped into the wild, where it would make its way to Gwen Stacy.
  - Jesse Drew – A former S.H.I.E.L.D. Agent and the Earth-65 version of Jessica Drew / Spider-Woman that sided with Cindy Moon after she cured him of his radiation poisoning. As a member of S.I.L.K., Jesse Drew operates as Agent 77.
  - Otto Octavius – A scientist that works for S.I.L.K.
  - Project Green – In this reality, the Super-Adaptoid was known as Project Green.
- Adrian Toomes / the Vulture – An ex-Oscorp employee who targeted police officers. This version secretes a green cloud of gas wherever he goes.
- Susan and Johnny Storm – In this reality, the Storm Twins (modelled after Cersei and Jaime Lannister as respectively portrayed by Lena Headey and Nikolaj Coster-Waldau in Game of Thrones) are former child stars-turned-influencer sitcom leads of the popular television series The Fantastic Four. Secretly sharing an incestuous and manipulative relationship, both siblings publicly go missing on a trip to Latveria. They seduce and manipulate the benevolent Latverian ruler Victor Von Doom over the course of five years into granting them superpowers, before Susan murders him and takes his place as Doctor Doom, converting Latveria to a dictatorship under her command. When the siblings return to New York, they murder their own mother before blackmailing Gwen Stacy into leaving her home reality, taking control over the criminal underworld while posing as vigilantes to "stop" crimes they themselves instigated.

=== Other characters ===
- Ben Grimm – In this reality, Ben Grimm is a police officer for the NYPD.
- Ben Parker – The uncle of Peter Parker who is still alive in this reality and is a neighbor of the Stacy family. Though Ben largely behaves no differently than his counterpart on Earth-616, he is arguably among the most deeply affected by Peter's death aside from Gwen, and therefore harbors a great deal of anger and resentment especially in regards to Spider-Woman.
- Samantha Wilson / Captain America – In this reality, Captain America is a female pilot who went through Project Rebirth after Steve Rogers, Bucky Barnes, and Isaiah Bradley were badly injured by Nazi double agents.
  - Sam 13 / Falcon – In this reality, Falcon is a male clone of Captain America, who has a robotic bird companion named Redwing.
- Felicia Hardy – In this reality, Felicia Hardy was a musician who planned revenge on Matt Murdock for killing her father after he stole some of the Kingpin's money.
- Foggy Nelson – Foggy Nelson is a District Attorney.
- Isaiah Bradley – He was one of the candidates for Project Rebirth until he was injured by Nazi double agents.
- J. Jonah Jameson – The Mayor of New York City. Not unlike his Earth-616 counterpart, Jameson is one of Spider-Woman's harshest critics, and his smear campaign of her gained much pedigree following Peter Parker's death.
- James Barnes – He was one of the candidates for Project Rebirth until he was injured by Nazi double agents. After retiring later on, James Barnes had a medical center named after him.
- Jean DeWolff – A detective in the NYPD's Special Crimes Task Force, she is a close friend of George Stacy and is partnered up with Frank Castle.
- The Mary Janes – A rock band formed by Gwen and three close friends, in which Gwen herself plays the drums.
  - Mary Jane Watson/Carnage – The lead singer and lead guitarist of Gwen's band, The Mary Janes. As a result of being transported to the 616 universe during the King in Black crossover event, Mary Jane became this universe's version of Carnage.
  - Betty Brant – The Bass player of The Mary Janes who is Gwen Stacy's roommate.
  - Glory Grant – Member of The Mary Janes.
- May Parker – The aunt of Peter Parker who is a neighbor of the Stacy family.
- Norman Osborn – In this reality, Norman is still the CEO of Oscorp, but appears to be far more benign and benevolent than his counterpart on Earth-616. He is shown to care deeply for Harry, and begs for Spider-Woman's help in curing him of the Lizard serum.
- Peggy Carter – In this reality, Peggy Carter is an operative for the Strategic Scientific Reserve who oversaw Project Rebirth. In a later life, Peggy Carter became the corrupt director of S.H.I.E.L.D.
  - Manji Logan – In this reality, Manji Logan is a S.H.I.E.L.D. assassin and former immortal samurai and Weapon X test subject known as The Immortal Mr. Murderhands, sent to hunt down Harry Osborn. He is a composite character of Manji from the manga series Blade of the Immortal and Wolverine, exploring a world in which the former had become the latter in place of James Howlett.
- Randy Robertson – In this reality, Randy Robertson is a rock and roll reporter.
- Steve Rogers – He was one of the candidates for Project Rebirth until he was injured by Nazi double-agents. In a later life, he illustrated the "Captain America" comics.
- The Yancy Street Gang – The Yancy Street Gang are shown to root for Spider-Woman.
  - Hobie Brown – Member of the Yancy Street Gang.

== Reception ==
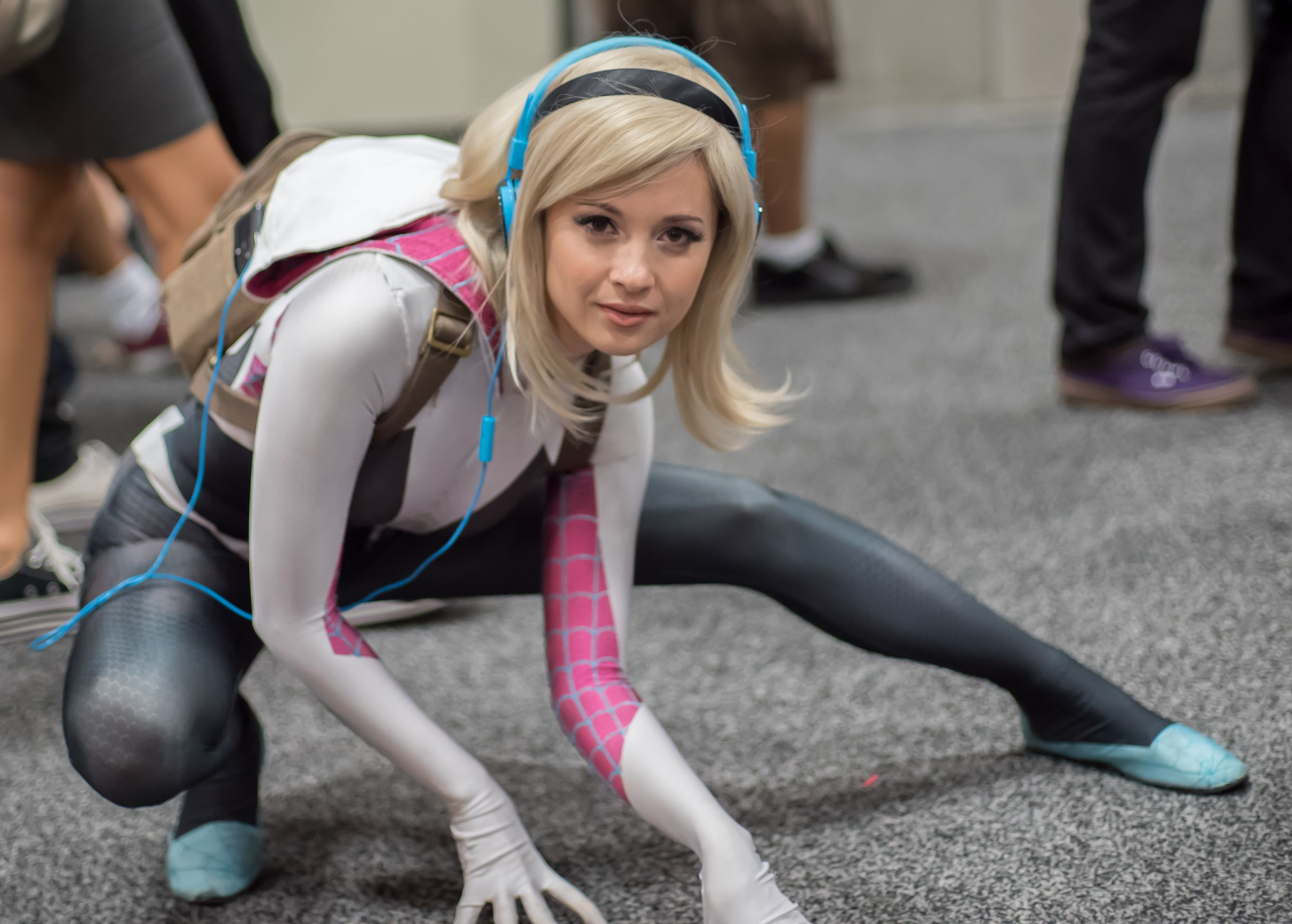
Cosplay of Spider-Gwen

Spider-Gwen has received positive reviews from critics. IGN said "Spider-Gwen's new comic gets off to a solid start thanks to a hip tone, strong characterization, and vibrant artwork." Comic Book Resources said that the first issue was "fun, familiar, energetic and invigorating, the art is engaging and the character has nothing but potential to offer. "Spider-Gwen" #1 is more than just a comic with something for everyone; it's a comic with everything for everyone."

Spider-Gwen #1 was the third-best selling comic of February 2015, selling over 300,000 copies.

== Collected editions ==
=== Radioactive Spider-Gwen ===
#	Title	Material collected	Pages	Publication date	ISBN
Paperback
0	Most Wanted?	Edge of Spider-Verse #2, Spider-Gwen (vol. 1) #1–5	112	November 2015	978-07-851-9773-7

=== Spider-Gwen Vol. 2 ===
#	Title	Material collected	Pages	Publication date	ISBN
1	Greater Power	Spider-Gwen (vol. 2) #1–6	136	May 2016	978-07-851-9959-5
Spider-Women		Spider-Women Alpha #1, Silk (vol. 2) #7–8, Spider-Gwen (vol. 2) #7–8, Spider-Woman (vol. 6) #6–7, Spider-Women Omega #1	200	July 2016	978-13-029-0093-9
2	Weapon of Choice	Spider-Gwen (vol. 2) #9–13	112	January 2017	978-07-851-9960-1
3	Long Distance	Spider-Gwen (vol. 2) #14-15, Spider-Gwen Annual #1, All-New Wolverine Annual #1	112	July 2017	978-13-029-0310-7
Spider-Man/Spider-Gwen: Sitting in a Tree		Spider-Gwen (vol. 2) #16-18, Spider-Man (vol. 2) #12-14	136	May 2017	978-13-029-0762-4
4	Predators	Spider-Gwen (vol. 2) #19–23	112	October 2017	978-13-029-0596-5
5	Gwenom	Spider-Gwen (vol. 2) #24–29	136	May 2018	978-13-029-0764-8
6	The Life of Gwen Stacy	Spider-Gwen (vol. 2) #30-34	112	October 2, 2018	978-13-029-1192-8
Modern Era Epic Collection
1	Edge of Spider-Verse	Edge of Spider-Verse #2, Spider-Gwen (vol. 1) #1–5, Spider-Gwen (vol. 2) #1–8, Spider-Women Alpha #1, Silk (vol. 2) #7–8, Spider-Woman (vol. 6) #6–7, Spider-Woman Omega #1	480	May 1, 2023	978-13-029-4998-3
2	Weapon of Choice	Spider-Gwen (vol. 2) #9–24, Spider-Gwen Annual #1, All-New Wolverine Annual #1, Spider-Man (vol. 2) #12-14	496	February 20, 2024	978-13-029-5635-6
3	Gwenom	Spider-Gwen (vol. 2) #25-34, Spider-Geddon: Ghost Spider Video Comic, Spider-Gwen: Ghost-Spider (vol. 1) #1–10	464	October 14, 2025	978-13-029-6589-1
Hardcover
1	Spider-Gwen Vol. 1	Edge of Spider-Verse #2, Spider-Gwen (vol. 1) #1–5, Spider-Gwen (vol. 2) #1–6	272	February 2017	978-13-029-0371-8
2	Spider-Gwen Vol. 2	Spider-Gwen (vol. 2) #7–15, Spider-Gwen Annual #1, All-New Wolverine Annual #1	264	January 2018	978-13-029-0900-0
3	Spider-Gwen Vol. 3	Spider-Gwen (vol. 2) #16-23, Spider-Man (vol. 2) #12-14	248	October 2018	978-13-029-1369-4
Graphic Novel Trade Paperback
Spider-Gwen: Gwen Stacy		Edge of Spider-Verse #2, Spider-Gwen (vol. 1) #1–5, Spider-Gwen (vol. 2) #1–6	272	October 2019	978-13-029-1986-3
Spider-Gwen: Amazing Powers		Spider-Gwen (vol. 2) #9–15, Spider-Gwen Annual #1 and All-New Wolverine Annual #1	224	June 2020	978-13-029-2372-3
Spider-Gwen: Deal With The Devil		Spider-Gwen (vol. 2) #16-23, Spider-Man (vol. 2) #12–14	238	April 2022	978-13-029-3165-0
Spider-Gwen: Unmasked		Spider-Gwen (vol. 2) #24-34	240	November 2022	978-13-029-4525-1
Omnibus
Spider-Gwen		Edge of Spider-Verse #2, Spider-Gwen (2015A) #1–5, Spider-Gwen (2015B) #1–34, Spider-Gwen Annual #1, All-New Wolverine Annual #1, Spider-Women Alpha and Omega, Silk (2015B) #7–8, Spider-Woman (2015) #6–7 and Spider-Man (2016) #12-14	1,224	June 2021	978-13-029-3038-7
Spider-Gwen: Ghost-Spider		Spider-Gwen: Ghost-Spider (2018) #1–10, Spider-Geddon: Ghost-Spider Video Comic (2018) #1, Ghost-Spider (2019) #1–10, Ghost-Spider Annual #1, King in Black: Gwenom vs. Carnage (2021) #1–3, Web-Warriors (2015) #1–11 and material from Amazing Spider-Man (2015) #1	824	August 2023	978-13-029-4679-1

=== Spider-Gwen Vol. 3: Ghost-Spider ===
#	Title	Material collected	Pages	Publication date	ISBN
Paperback
1	Spider-Gwen: Ghost-Spider Vol. 1 - Spider-Geddon	Spider-Gwen: Ghost-Spider #1–4, Spider-Geddon: Ghost-Spider Video Comic #1	112	May 21, 2019	978-13-029-1476-9
2	Spider-Gwen: Ghost-Spider Vol. 2 - The Impossible Year	Spider-Gwen: Ghost-Spider #5–10	136	Sept 17, 2019	978-13-029-1477-6
Graphic Novel Trade Paperback
Spider-Gwen: Ghost Spider		Spider-Gwen: Ghost-Spider #1–10, Spider-Geddon: Ghost-Spider Video Comic	240	August 2023	978-13-029-5010-1

=== Spider-Gwen Vol. 4: Into the Unknown ===
#	Title	Material collected	Pages	Publication date	ISBN
Paperback
1	Ghost-Spider Vol. 1 - Dog Days Are Over	Ghost-Spider #1–5	112	February 18, 2020	978-13-029-2012-8
2	Ghost-Spider Vol. 2 - Party People	Ghost-Spider #6–10	112	January 5, 2021	978-13-029-2470-6
Graphic Novel Trade Paperback
Spider-Gwen: Into the Unknown		Ghost-Spider #1–10	224	August 13, 2024	978-13-029-5695-0

=== Spider-Gwen Vol. 5: Gwenom vs. Carnage ===
#	Title	Material collected	Pages	Publication date	ISBN
Spider-Gwen: Gwenom vs. Carnage		King in Black: Gwenom vs. Carnage #1–3 and King in Black: Scream #1, King in Black: Spider-Man #1	136	August 17, 2021	978-13-029-2811-7

=== Spider-Gwen Vol. 6: Gwenverse ===
#	Title	Material collected	Pages	Publication date	ISBN
Spider-Gwen: Gwenverse		Spider-Gwen: Gwenverse #1–5	128	November 22, 2022	978-13-029-3465-1

=== Spider-Gwen Vol. 7: Shadow Clones ===
#	Title	Material collected	Pages	Publication date	ISBN
Spider-Gwen: Shadow Clones		Spider-Gwen: Shadow Clones #1–5	128	October 17, 2023	978-13-029-5118-4

=== Spider-Gwen Vol. 8: Smash ===
#	Title	Material collected	Pages	Publication date	ISBN
Spider-Gwen: Smash		Spider-Gwen: Smash #1–4 and Giant-Size Spider-Gwen #1	128	August 27, 2024	978-13-029-5655-4

=== Spider-Gwen Vol. 9: The Ghost-Spider ===
#	Title	Material collected	Pages	Publication date	ISBN
1	Haunted	Spider-Gwen: The Ghost-Spider #1–5 and material from Web Of Spider-Man (2024) #1	136	January 21, 2025	978-13-029-5886-2
2	Unraveled	Spider-Gwen: The Ghost-Spider #6–10	112	June 10, 2025	978-13-029-5887-9
3	Uncharted	Spider-Gwen: The Ghost-Spider #11–15	120	November 25, 2025	978-13-029-6469-6
