= Kiss of the Spider Woman =

Kiss of the Spider Woman may refer to:

- Kiss of the Spider Woman (novel), (Spanish: El beso de la mujer araña) the 1976 novel by the Argentine writer Manuel Puig
- Kiss of the Spider Woman (play), the 1983 stage play Puig adapted from his novel
- Kiss of the Spider Woman (1985 film), (Portuguese: O beijo da mulher-aranha) the 1985 film adaptation of the novel directed by Héctor Babenco
- Kiss of the Spider Woman (musical), the 1992 Broadway musical by John Kander and Fred Ebb adapting Puig's novel
- Kiss of the Spider Woman (2025 film), a 2025 film adaptation of the musical directed by Bill Condon
- "Chapter Seven: Kiss of the Spider Woman", a 2020 episode of the television series Katy Keene

== See also ==
- Spider Woman (disambiguation)
