= Jason Latour =

American comic-book and comic-strip artist and writer (born 1977)

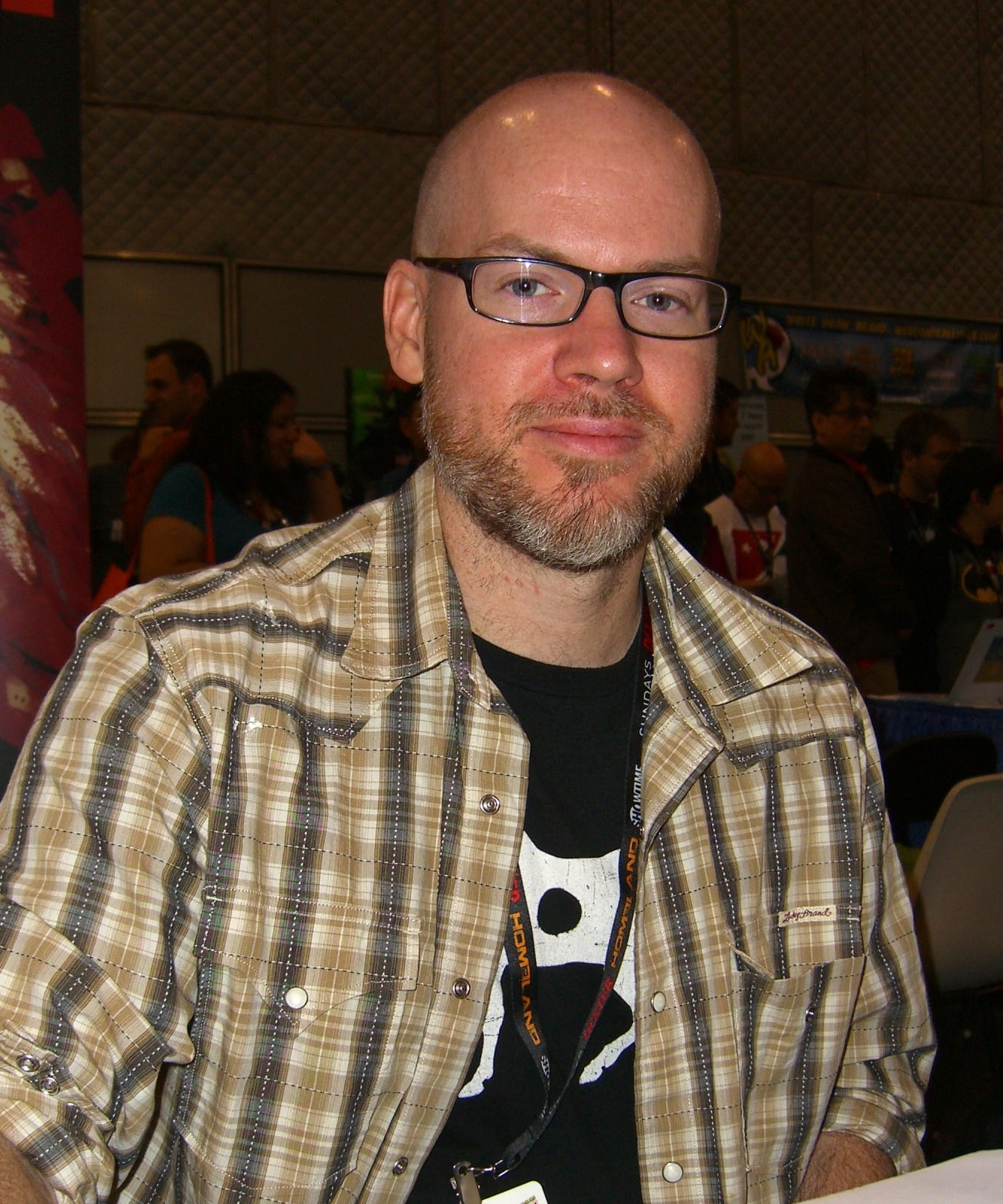
- Latour at the 2011 New York Comic Con
- Born: David Jason Latour; August 29, 1977 (age 49) Charlotte, North Carolina
- Areas: Writer, Artist
- Notable works: Wolverine; Winter Soldier; Django Unchained; B.P.R.D.; Southern Bastards; Spider-Gwen

David Jason Latour (born August 29, 1977) is an American comic-book and comic-strip artist and writer known for his work for Image Comics, Dark Horse Comics, Marvel Comics, and DC Comics on titles such as Wolverine, Winter Soldier, Southern Bastards and Spider-Gwen, co-creating Spider-Woman / Gwen Stacy (Earth-65) in the latter, later adapted to the Spider-Verse film franchise.

== Early life ==
Jason Latour was born in Charlotte, NC and graduated from West Mecklenburg High School. He received a Bachelor's degree in 1999 from East Carolina University where he had minored in art and served as the head illustrator and cartoonist for The East Carolinian, the student newspaper.

== Career ==
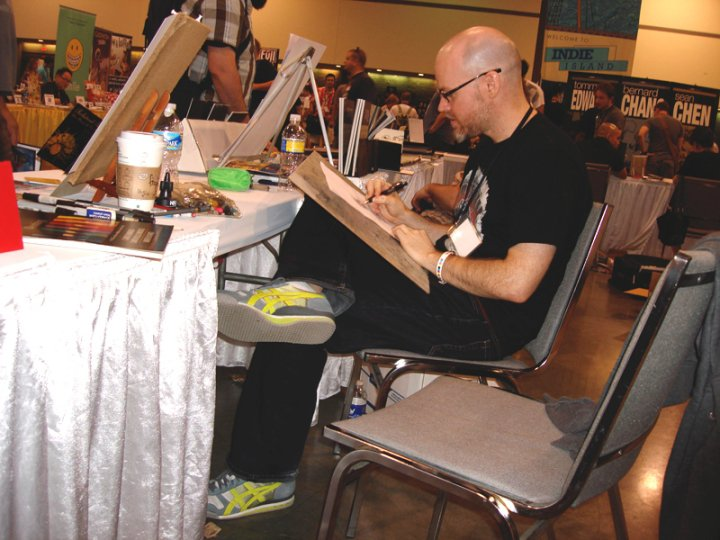
Latour sketching at Heroes Con 2010.

While Latour was a student at East Carolina University, he began his first foray into the comics field with his creator-owned humor comic strip 4 Seats Left.

Most recently, Latour served as production consultant on Spider-Man: Into the Spider-Verse (2018) and Spider-Man: Across the Spider-Verse (2023). Both films featured Spider-Woman, the motion-picture name of the character Latour co-created Spider-Gwen (see below).

In late 2004, Latour and writer B. Clay Moore created the short-lived series The Expatriate at Image Comics. In 2009, he was hired to illustrate the Vertigo Comics Vertigo Crime graphic novel Noche Roja (with Simon Oliver, graphic novel, hc, 184 pages, 2011, ISBN 1-4012-1535-1; sc, 2011, ISBN 1-4012-3062-8), which was published in 2011, and has since worked as an artist on comic-book titles such as the 2010 Marvel Comics miniseries Daredevil: Black & White, Wolverine (2010) and the critically acclaimed crime series Scalped (Vertigo 2010). In 2011, his creator-owned long-form writing debut Loose Ends (with artist Chris Brunner) was published by Image Comics in conjunction with independent publisher 12-Gauge Comics.

=== Spider-Gwen ===
In September 2014, Latour co-created Spider-Gwen, an alternate-universe version of Gwen Stacy that debuted in Edge of Spider-Verse #2. The character's popularity quickly warranted an ongoing Spider-Gwen comic-book series published by Marvel Comics that began in February 2015. The series explored a universe where Gwen Stacy was bitten by a radioactive spider instead of Peter Parker, leading her to a career as the Spider-Woman of her world. The first volume ended after the fifth issue with the character carrying over into the second volume of "Spider-Verse" as part of the "Secret Wars" story line. Latour wrapped up his Spider-Gwen run in 2019 to focus on creator-owned material. On Latour's retirement in August 2020, Marvel Comics stated they had no current projects planned with him.

=== Southern Bastards ===
Also in 2014, Latour and writer Jason Aaron co-created the comic-book series Southern Bastards at Image Comics. The series revolves around the culture in a small town in the American South where football is everything and people try to get away with crime. The series won the 2015 Harvey Award for Best New Series and the 2016 Eisner Award for Best Continuing Series. Latour primarily illustrated the series, but also wrote two issues of the title to date.

In August 2020, the series paused after Latour took a leave of absence in light of misconduct allegations, before Latour returned to publishing creator-owned work in January 2022, including in Image 30th Anniversary Anthology #12 (April 2023).

== Bibliography ==
=== As artist ===
- The Expatriate #1-4 (with B. Clay Moore, Image Comics, 2005)
- 24Seven vol. 2 (Image Comics, 2007)
- PopGun vol. 1 (Image Comics, 2007)
- Daredevil Black and White #1 (with Peter Milligan, Marvel, 2010 one-shot)
- Wolverine, vol. 4 #1 - The Last Stand of the Silver Samurai (with Jason Aaron, Marvel, 2010)
- Wolverine, vol. 4 #5 - Scorched Earth: Conclusion- (with Jason Aaron, Marvel, 2011)
- I Am an Avenger #1 - The Books of the Iron Fist (with Duane Swierczynski, Marvel, 2010)
- Scalped #43 (with Jason Aaron DC/Vertigo, 2010)
- Noche Roja (with Simon Oliver Vertigo Crime Line OGN DC/Vertigo, 2011)
- Captain America, #616 - Spin- (with Cullen Bunn, Marvel, 2011)
- Fear Itself: The Home Front #5 - Red/White Blues (with Si Spurrier, Marvel, 2011)
- Wolverine, #309 (with Ivan Brandon, Marvel, 2012)
- B.P.R.D. The Pickens County Horror, (with Mike Mignola & Scott Allie, Darkhorse, 2012)
- Django Unchained (comic adaptation), (with Quentin Tarantino & RM Guera, DC/Vertigo, 2012)
- Sledgehammer 44, (with Mike Mignola & John Arcudi, Darkhorse, 2013)
- Southern Bastards #1-11, 13–17, 19-21 (with Jason Aaron, Image, 2014)

=== As writer ===
- Loose Ends (with Chris Brunner & Rico Renzi 12-Gauge Comics, 2011)
- Untold Tales of Punisher MAX (with Connor Willumsen Marvel Comics) Marvel Comics, 2012
- A+X #4 (with David Lopez Marvel Comics), 2012
- Winter Soldier #15-19 (with Nic Klein, Marvel Comics), 2013
- Wolverine and the X-Men #1-12 (with Mahmud Asrar, Marvel Comics, 2014)
- Original Sin Annual (with Enis Cisic, Marvel Comics, 2014)
- Edge of Spider-Verse #2 (with Robbi Rodriguez, Marvel Comics, 2014)
- Southern Bastards #12, 18 (with Chris Brunner, Image, 2015)
- Spider-Gwen #1-5, Vol. 2 #1-34 (with Robbi Rodriguez, Marvel Comics, 2015)
