= Silk (character) =

Marvel Comics superhero

- Variant cover of Silk, Vol. 3, Threats & Menaces, #1 (March 2021). Art by Junggeun Yoon.

Publication information
- Publisher: Marvel Comics
- First appearance: Cameo appearance: The Amazing Spider-Man #1 (April 2014); Full appearance: The Amazing Spider-Man #4 (July 2014)
- Created by: Dan Slott (writer); Humberto Ramos (artist)

In-story information
- Full name: Cindy Moon
- Species: Human mutate
- Place of origin: Manhattan, New York
- Team affiliations: Protectors; Spider-Army / Web-Warriors; Agents of Atlas; Champions
- Partnerships: Peter Parker / Spider-Man
- Notable aliases: Silk; Silkworm; Spider-Woman; Spider-Girl; Spider-Bride; Spectacular Spinning Jenny; Velvet Weaver
- Abilities: Superhuman strength, speed, agility, equilibrium, reflexes, stamina, and durability; Ability to cling to solid surfaces; Organic web generation; Precognitive silk-sense; Expert martial artist and hand-to-hand combatant; Eidetic memory

Silk is a superhero appearing in American comic books published by Marvel Comics. Created by Dan Slott and Humberto Ramos, she first appeared in The Amazing Spider-Man #1 (April 2014). Silk is the alias of Cindy Moon, a Korean-American student who was bitten by the same radioactive spider that gave Peter Parker / Spider-Man his powers. After being a love interest of Peter Parker, she became a member of the Spider-Army / Web-Warriors and the Agents of Atlas, serving as a prominent supporting character in Spider-Verse (2014–2015), Spider-Geddon (2018), Spider-Man: Fake Red (2019–2020), End of the Spider-Verse (2022–2023), and All-New Spider-Gwen: Ghost-Spider (2025–present), and starring as the main character in The Life & Times of Cindy Moon, Sinister, Spider-Women, The Spider(fly) Effect, The Negative, The Clone Conspiracy, Out of the Spider-Verse, Threats & Menaces, Age of the Witch, and Nightmare Boulevard.

She is portrayed by Tiffany Espensen in the Marvel Cinematic Universe (MCU) films Spider-Man: Homecoming (2017), Avengers: Infinity War (2018), and the extended cut of Spider-Man: No Way Home (2021). The character will also appear in the animated spin-off film Spider-Woman, set in the Spider-Verse franchise.

== Publication history ==
The character first appeared in The Amazing Spider-Man vol. 3 #1 (April 2014) as a faceless cameo and was created by writer Dan Slott and artist Humberto Ramos. She made several other faceless appearances throughout the volume's first story arc, before making her full debut in The Amazing Spider-Man vol. 3 #4 (July 2014), as part of a tie-in to the "Original Sin" storyline. An ongoing title featuring Silk started publishing in February 2015, with scripts by Supernatural writer Robbie Thompson and art by Stacey Lee. Silk volume 1 came to an end during the Secret Wars event. After the event, a second volume began which concluded with issue #19.

Silk was part of the new Agents of Atlas team, which debuted in a War of the Realms tie-in and later got their own five-issue limited series.

A third Silk ongoing series was set to be published in July 2020 by writer Maurene Goo and artist Takeshi Miyazawa, but it was withheld due to the ongoing COVID-19 pandemic. The series was released in March 2021 as a five-issue limited series.

A fourth Silk series was released in January 2022 by writer Emily Kim with Takeshi Miyazawa returning as artist.

A fifth Silk series was released in May 2023 with writer Emily Kim returning and Ig Guara as artist.

== Fictional character biography ==
Cindy Moon is the daughter of Albert Moon Sr. and Nari Moon and the sister of Albert Moon Jr.. In this story's universe, the same radioactive spider which bit Peter Parker also bites Cindy Moon and grants her similar powers to those of Spider-Man. Cindy and her family are approached by Ezekiel Sims who initially trains Cindy in how to use her newfound abilities. After six years, however, Sims decides the only way to protect Cindy and others like her from the supervillian Morlun is to imprison them within a secure facility for their own "protection."

After seven years locked inside the facility, during which time Morlun has died, Spider-Man arrives to free everyone inside, including Cindy. It is after leaving the facility with Spider-Man that Cindy creates a costume for herself out of her own webbing and adopts the name Silk. After this event, Silk and Spider-Man begin working together to investigate whether or not Morlun is truly dead and the pair also begin experiencing feelings of intense sexual attraction whenever they are in proximity of each other.

Many of Silk's early story-arcs center around her desire to find her family, who she was separated from and lost contact with during her years imprisoned by Sims.

In several comic arcs, the character of Silk joins other Asian American superheroes to celebrate Asian American heritage and/or to explore superhero stories set in Asian countries and communities around the world.

== Powers and abilities ==
Cindy gained her superpowers when she was bitten by the same radioactive spider as Peter Parker, possessing similar abilities as his, including superhuman strength, speed, durability, reflexes, and equilibrium, the ability to cling to most surfaces, and the ability to shoot webs out of her fingertips. On their first meeting, Peter observed that she was faster than him, though not as strong. Her "Spider Sense" is called "Silk Sense" and is far stronger than Peter's. Additionally, she has an eidetic memory.

== Rogues gallery ==
In her comic series, Silk has fought different enemies of her own:

- Ash King – An inhabitant of the Negative Zone who held Albert Moon Sr. captive.
- Black Cat's Gang – A group of criminals led by Black Cat.
  - Black Cat – A cat burglar who leads the gang.
  - 8-Ball – An 8 ball-themed member of the gang.
  - Beetle – A beetle-themed member of the gang.
  - Dragonclaw – A dragon-themed member of the gang.
  - Killer Shrike – A member of the gang.
  - Melter – A member of the gang.
  - Repairman – A mechanic and member of the gang.
  - Ringer – A member of the gang.
  - Shocker – A member of the gang.
- Hydra – A terrorist organization.
- Goblin Nation – A goblin-themed organization.
  - Goblin King – The leader of the Goblin Nation.
  - Casey – A kid and former member of Black Cat's Gang who sided with the Goblin Nation and was mutated by the Goblin Formula.
  - Emmie – A kid who joined the Goblin Nation and was mutated by the Goblin Formula.

== Reception ==
=== Accolades ===
- In 2017, Gizmodo ranked Cindy Moon 3rd in their "Greatest Spider-Women of All Time" list.
- In 2017, Screen Rant ranked Cindy Moon 4th in their "28 Marvel Superheroes With Spider-Powers" list and 13th in their "Every Member Of The Spider-Man Family" list.
- In 2020, Scary Mommy included Cindy Moon in their "Looking For A Role Model? These 195+ Marvel Female Characters Are Truly Heroic" list.
- In 2020, CBR.com ranked Cindy Moon 6th in their "Marvel Comics: 10 Most Powerful Members Of Agents Of Atlas" list.
- In 2022, Screen Rant ranked Cindy Moon (from Earth-65) 7th in their "10 Most Powerful Silk Villains In Marvel Comics" list.

== Other versions ==
=== Spider-Gwen ===
In the crossover event Spider-Women, it is revealed that Cindy Moon of the Spider-Gwen universe (Earth-65) is the head of a nefarious spy organization called S.I.L.K., the romantic partner of Matt Murdock / Kingpin, and the main antagonist of the event. Cindy of Earth-65 almost had a similar spider bite accident to the main one, but a teacher swatted it with a newspaper. Dissatisfied with her life, she joins S.H.I.E.L.D. as a researcher in spiders. There was a spider-related incident in which Jesse Drew was nearly killed, but Cindy's research saves his life and gives him spider powers, with Agent Drew making it up to Cindy by becoming one of her top agents. She eventually recovers the altered spider back from S.H.I.E.L.D. with Jesse's help and releases it into the open, where it bit Gwen Stacy and led to her becoming Earth-65's Spider-Woman. During the Spider-Women event, Jesse steals Gwen's interdimensional teleporter and travels to Earth-616, where she steals a large amount of technology while framing her 616 counterpart. When she encounters Gwen and her counterpart, she uses her technology to take away Gwen's powers. When she returns to her hideout after Jesse's betrayal, she is ambushed by Jessica Drew, Gwen, and her counterpart and is defeated. S.H.I.E.L.D. locks her up for her crimes and her counterpart teases her by sending her a care package with all the things she had in her bunker.

The Earth-616 Silk had managed to meet the parents of her Earth-65 counterpart.

=== Spider-Man: Fake Red ===
In the manga Spider-Man: Fake Red, Cindy Moon / Silk appears as the best friend/partner of the missing Peter Parker, on whom she nurses an intense crush. On confronting Yu Onomae for using Peter's suit to fill in for him as Spider-Man on finding it in an alley, initially suspecting him as having something to do with his disappearance, Cindy guides Yu on his journey, continuing to look for Peter alone.

=== Web Weaver ===
On Earth-71490, the home of Web Weaver, Cindy's brother Albert is this universe's Silk. He and Web Weaver have a flirtatious rivalry, unaware that they used to date in their civilian identities. It is eventually revealed that he and Cindy were infected by a symbiote from an alternate dimension that killed their parents known as V-Star and were kept and studied in a bunker for nearly a decade. Due to the symbiote nearly killing Albert, Cindy absorbed more of it until her body and mind fully merged with it. She disappeared when the scientists tried to use her to open a portal to the dimension where the symbiote came from, and Albert was released shortly afterward as his body metabolized the symbiote within him, granting him superhuman abilities. Cindy eventually returns to her home as V-Star and begins killing the scientists responsible for her and her brother's condition. Albert tries to convince Web Weaver to stand down and let her carry it out, but they are forced to intervene when V-Star nearly targets S.H.I.E.L.D., and he manages to get through to Cindy and convinces her to leave.

== In other media ==
=== Television ===
- A live-action series based on Silk was in the works at Sony Pictures Television from Amy Pascal and Phil Lord and Christopher Miller, with Lauren Moon and Amazon Prime Video in talks to respectively write and distribute, and Tom Spezialy hired as showrunner and co-executive producer alongside Moon. MGM+ and Amazon ordered the series as Silk: Spider Society under showrunner Angela Kang in November 2022 before Amazon dropped it in May 2024, with Sony shopping it to other potential buyers.
- Silk will appear in Spidey and His Amazing Friends, voiced by Avelyn Choi.

=== Film ===
- Cindy Moon appears in films set in the Marvel Cinematic Universe (MCU), portrayed by Tiffany Espensen:
  - She first appears in Spider-Man: Homecoming (2017) as a classmate of Peter Parker and decathlon team member.
  - Cindy makes a cameo appearance in Avengers: Infinity War (2018), on the same bus as Peter and Ned at the beginning of the film.
  - Cindy appears in the post-credits scene of the extended edition of Spider-Man: No Way Home (2021) via archive and previously unused footage from Spider-Man: Homecoming.
- Sony Pictures was developing a film based on Silk set in Sony's Spider-Man Universe before it was reworked into Silk: Spider Society.
- Cindy Moon / Silk was originally considered to appear in Spider-Man: Into the Spider-Verse, but the filmmakers chose to use Peni Parker instead.
  - Silk will appear in the Spider-Verse spin-off film Spider-Woman.

=== Video games ===
- Silk appears as an unlockable playable character in Spider-Man Unlimited.
- Silk appears as an unlockable playable character in Marvel: Avengers Alliance.
- Silk appears as an unlockable playable character in Marvel Avengers Academy, voiced by Victoria Wong.
- Silk appears as an unlockable playable character in Marvel Future Fight.
- Silk appears as an unlockable playable character in Marvel Puzzle Quest.
- Silk appears as an unlockable playable character in Lego Marvel Super Heroes 2.
- Silk appears as an unlockable playable character in Marvel Contest of Champions.
- Cindy Moon makes a non-speaking cameo appearance in the post-credits scene of Marvel's Spider-Man 2.

=== Merchandise ===
- Silk received a figure in HeroClix's "Superior Foes of Spider-Man" line.
- Silk received an action figure in the Marvel Legends line as part of the Spaceknight Venom Build-A-Figure set.

== Collected editions ==
Title	Material collected	Publication date	ISBN
Silk Vol. 0: The Life & Times of Cindy Moon	Silk (vol. 1) #1–7	December 8, 2015	978-0-785-19704-1
Silk Vol. 1: Sinister	Silk (vol. 2) #1–6 and The Amazing Spider-Man (vol. 3) #1 (Silk story)	June 7, 2016	978-0-785-19957-1
Spider-Women	Silk (vol. 2) #7–8, Spider-Gwen (vol. 2) #7–8 and Spider-Woman (vol. 6) #6–7	July 26, 2016	978-1-302-90093-9
Amazing Spider-Man & Silk: The Spider(fly) Effect	Amazing Spider-Man & Silk: The Spider(fly) Effect #1–4	October 4, 2016	978-1-302-90231-5
Silk Vol. 2: The Negative	Silk (vol. 2) #9–13	January 3, 2017	978-0-785-19958-8
Silk Vol. 3: The Clone Conspiracy	Silk (vol. 2) #14–19	August 22, 2017	978-1-302-90593-4
War of the Realms: New Agents of Atlas	War of The Realms: New Agents of Atlas #1–4	September 17, 2019	978-1-302-91877-4
Agents of Atlas: Pandemonium	Agents of Atlas (vol. 3) #1–5	February 18, 2020	978-1-302-92011-1
Silk: Out of the Spider-Verse Vol. 1	The Amazing Spider-Man (vol. 4) #4–6, Silk (vol. 1) #1–7 and Silk (vol. 2) #1–6	March 2, 2021	978-1-302-92873-5
Silk: Out of the Spider-Verse Vol. 2	The Amazing Spider-Man & Silk: The Spider(fly) Effect #1–4, Spider-Women Alpha #1, Spider-Gwen (vol. 2) #7–8, Silk (vol. 2) #7–8, Spider-Woman (vol. 6) #6–7, Spider-Women Omega #1	July 6, 2021	978-1-302-92988-6
Silk Vol. 1: Threats & Menaces	Silk (vol. 3) #1–5	November 25, 2021	978-1-302-92439-3
Silk: Out of the Spider-Verse Vol. 3	Silk (vol. 2) #9–19	December 7, 2021	978-1-302-93170-4
Silk Vol. 2: Age of the Witch	Silk (vol. 4) #1–5	July 19, 2022	978-1-302-93279-4
Silk Vol. 3: Nightmare Boulevard	Silk (vol. 5) #1–5	December 6, 2023	978-1-302-94952-5
