= Nick Lowe (comics) =

American comics editor

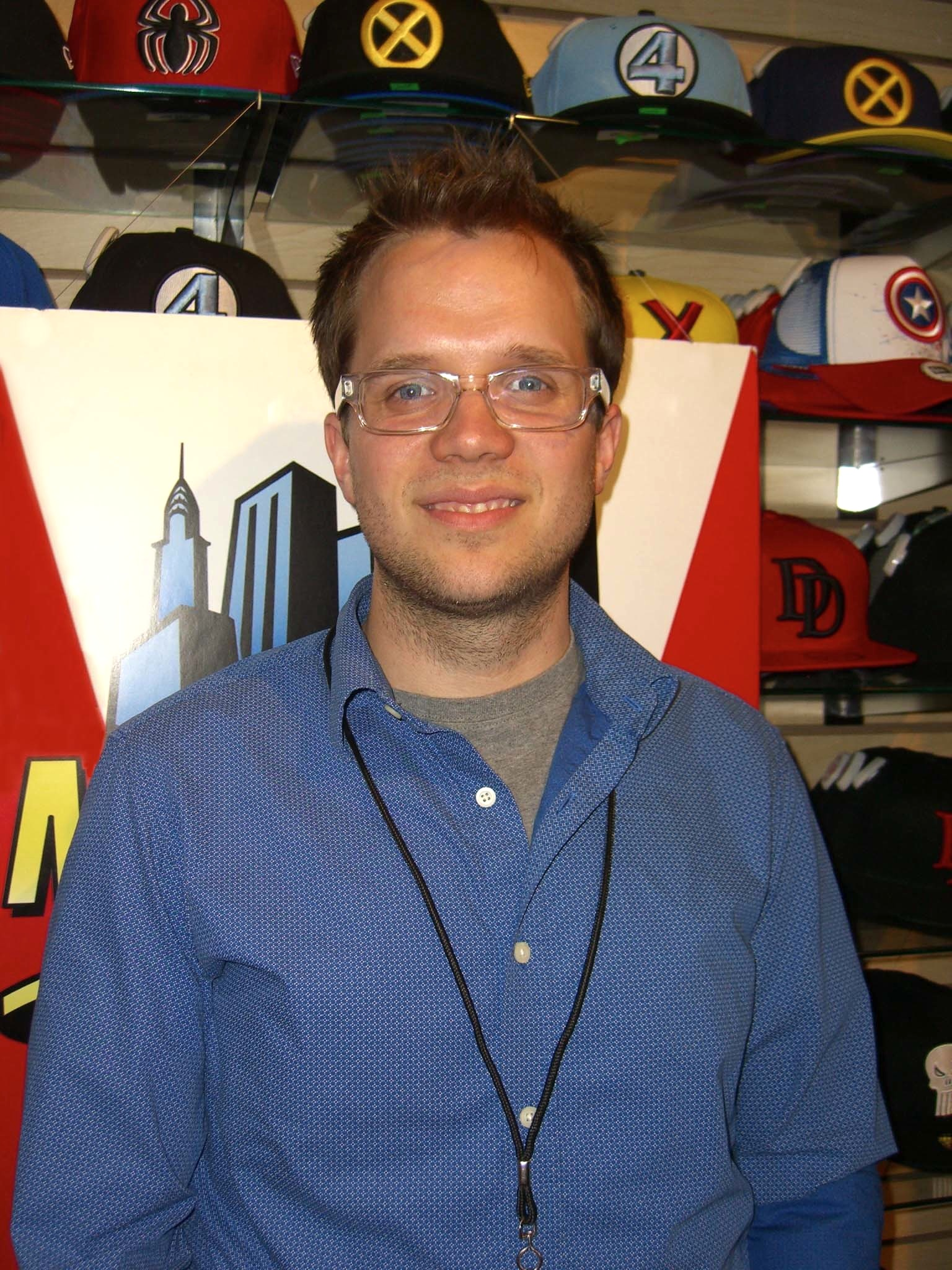
- Lowe at a "Meet the Publishers" Q&A at Midtown Comics Downtown in Manhattan, April 14, 2011
- Born: Nicholas Albert Lowe; October 7, 1979 (age 47)
- Area: Editor

Nicholas Albert "Nick" Lowe (born October 7, 1979) is the vice president of Content, Digital Publishing and executive editor at Marvel Comics. He was formerly senior editor of the X-Men titles. He was responsible for the Nextwave title, along with The Eternals by Neil Gaiman.

== Early life ==
Lowe grew up on the west side of Cleveland. During high school, he attended the prestigious St. Ignatius High School. While there he participated in school plays and musicals. Lowe attended The Catholic University of America, majoring in drama.

== Career ==
Lowe began his comics career as an intern at Marvel Comics during the inception of the Marvel Knights line. Commenting his fanlike enthusiasm for handling art by notable artists, Lowe recalls, "The best thing was making copies, which sounds insane, I know, but it was photocopying comic art...Come on! John Romita Jr., Frank Quitely, Joe [Quesada], Carlos Pacheco, Barry Windsor Smith—it was awesome. I ran errands, filed things, organized comics, etc. The most unexpected [assignment] was when Axel Alonso asked me to read the first Incredible Hulk issue of his editorial run and offer feedback and suggestions. That was a blast."

Lowe has edited many books in the Ultimate Marvel line, notably Ultimate Spider-Man, The Ultimates, and Ultimate Iron Man, the book for which he brought noted novelist Orson Scott Card to the Marvel fold. Lowe also worked on Neil Gaiman's 1602, The Eternals, Supreme Power, The Punisher: Born, Silk: The Life and Times of Cindy Moon, and Runaways. He was made the editor on X-Men after Axel Alonso left that position.

Lowe approached J. J. Abrams about collaborating on a Spider-Man venture around 2009. Ten years later, Cadaverous, a new villain, was introduced.

Lowe is also well known for making audio drops for the popular podcast, The Glass Cannon, based on the Pathfinder Roleplaying Game.
