= Licorice pipe =

Licorice candy shaped like a tobacco pipe

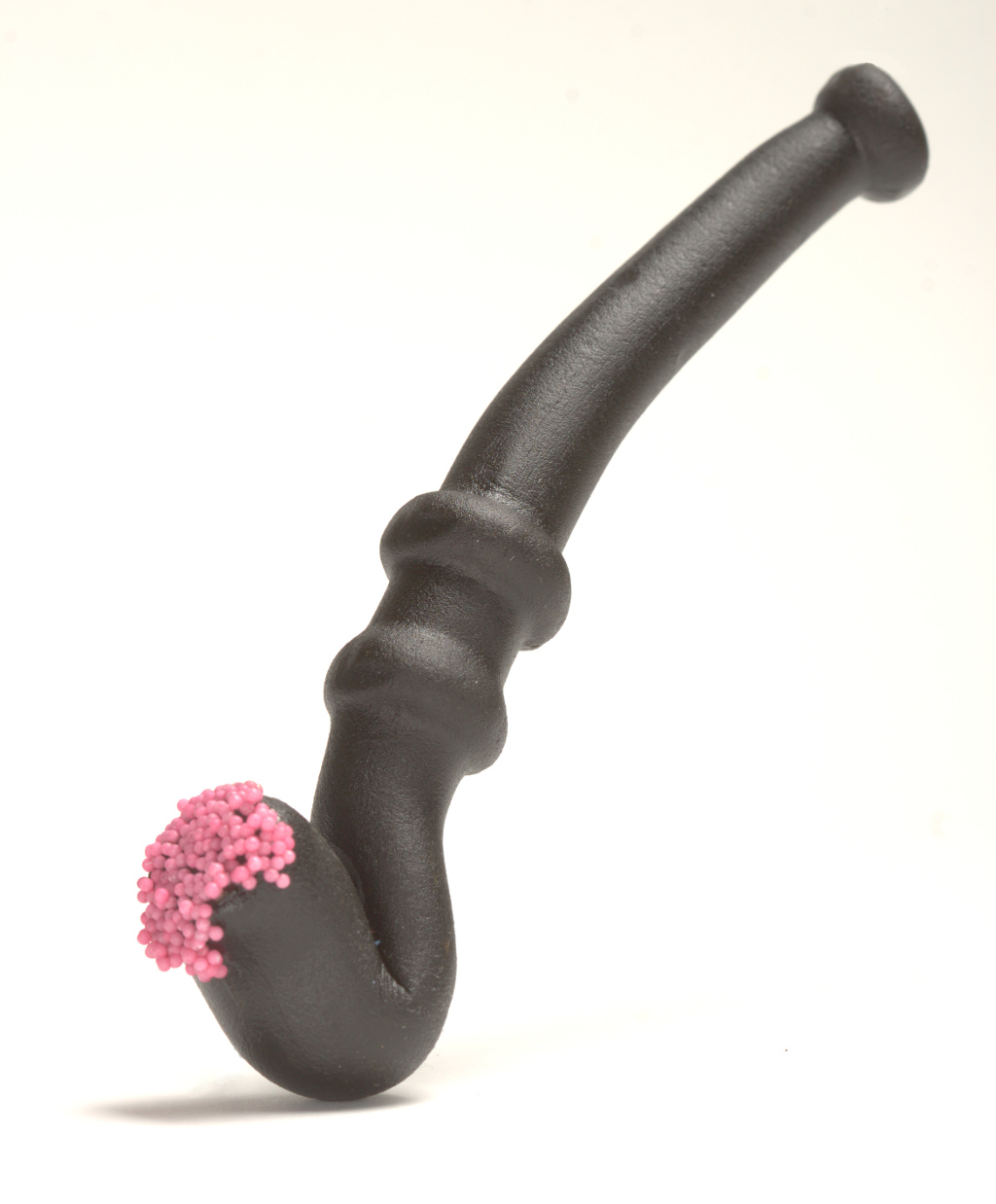
Licorice pipe with bright red nonpareils on the bowl

A licorice pipe is a candy made of licorice shaped like a tobacco pipe, often with red sugar balls on the head of the pipe. A pipe may weigh around 16 grams, and the licorice is usually soft and sweet. There are also other varieties, for example with blue or yellow sugar balls, the latter with a taste of sea salt.

== History ==
The first known licorice pipe (Finnish: lakupiippu) was manufactured as early as the 1920s at the Heikki Huhtamäki factory in Kokkola, Finland.

In January 2010, displaying licorice pipes for sale in stores was banned in Norway. In August 2013, licorice pipes again made headlines because of a forthcoming EU directive on tobacco prevention, with the potential of a ban which could affect the sale of sweets and toys imitating tobacco products. The licorice pipe then went clear of the ban.

The Norwegian Progress Party has worked towards removing the ban on displaying licorice pipes in stores.

== See also ==
- Bubble pipe
- FADS Fun Sticks
- Hippy Sippy
- Weed World Candies
- Candy cigarette
