= Faget =

Faget may refer to:

== People with the surname ==
- Alfredo Faget (1923–2003), Cuban basketball player
- Jean Charles Faget (1818–1884), American physician
  - Faget sign, a medical sign of fever and bradycardia indicating yellow fever
- Guy Henry Faget (1891–1947), American physician
- Maxime Faget (1921–2004), American engineer
- Mignon Faget (born 1933), American jewelry designer

== Places ==
- Le Faget, commune in the Haute-Garonne department in southwestern France
- Faget-Abbatial commune in the Gers department in southwestern France
- Mount Faget, Antarctic mountain

== Other uses ==
- "Faget" (song), a 1994 song by the nu metal group Korn from their album Korn
- Faggot (unit)
- Faget sign, a medical sign of fever and bradycardia indicating yellow fever

== See also ==
- Făget (disambiguation), several places in Romania
- Fagot (disambiguation)
- Faggot (disambiguation)
