= Fred Fagg =

Fred Fagg may refer to:

- Fred D. Fagg, Jr., President of the University of Southern California from 1947 to 1957
- Fred D. Fagg III (1934–2002), dean of the Northwestern School of Law at Lewis & Clark in Portland, Oregon from 1973 to 1982
