= Fag =

Fag or FAG may refer to:

- Cigarette, in British and Australian slang
- Fagging, hierarchical servitude in British public schools
- Faggot, a pejorative term for a homosexual
- FAG, a brand of the Schaeffler Group
- FAGS, now FADS Fun Sticks, an Australian candy
- Fagurhólsmýri Airport, in Iceland by IATA code
- Federação Anarquista Gaúcha, a Brazilian anarchist organization
- Feminist Art Gallery, in Toronto, Ontario, Canada
- Film Actors Guild, from the 2004 film Team America: World Police
- Finongan language, spoken in Papua New Guinea (ISO 639 code)
- Fluorescein angiography
- Football Association of Greenland
- Frisch Auf Göppingen, a German sport club
- Fuerzas Armadas Guanches, a terrorist group in the Canary Islands
- Guatemalan Air Force (Spanish: Fuerza Aérea Guatemalteca)

== See also ==
- Fag hag (disambiguation)
- Fagg (disambiguation)
- Faggot (disambiguation)
- Fagot (disambiguation)
