= Faggot (disambiguation) =

Faggot is a slur used to refer to a homosexual or queer person, usually a gay man.

Faggot, faggots, or faggoting may refer to:

== Arts and crafts ==
- Faggoting (metalworking), forge welding a bundle of bars of iron and steel
- Faggoting (knitting), variation of lace knitting in which every stitch is a yarn over or a decrease
- Faggoting stitch, featherstitch, or Cretan stitch, embroidery stitch used to make decorative seams or to attach insertions

== Biology ==
- Faggot cell, cell type found in acute promyelocytic leukemia
- Eumeta crameri or faggot worm, from the bundles of twigs it binds to itself

== Branch ==
- faggot or fagot, branch or twig, or bundle of these
  - Fascine, bundle of brushwood used in civil and military engineering
  - Fasces, ancient symbol of an axe bound in a bundle of rods
  - Faggot (unit), archaic unit of measurement for bundles of sticks

== Literature and music ==
- Faggots (novel), 1978 novel by Larry Kramer
- The Faggot, 1876 book by Charles Tylor
- "Faggot", a track from Deadbeat Hero by Doug Stanhope
- "Faggot", a track from Frankenstein Girls Will Seem Strangely Sexy by Mindless Self Indulgence
- "Faggot", a track from Mutant by Arca
- Bassoon, also called a faggot

== People with the surname ==
- Jacob Faggot (1699–1777), Swedish scientist
- Nicholas Faggot, a character in Redgauntlet, Walter Scott's 1824 novel

== Other uses ==
- Faggot (food), British meatball commonly made of pork offal
- Faggot, Northumberland, uninhabited island off England
- Ashen faggot, English West country Christmas tradition
- Faggot voter, exploiting an electoral abuse
- Faggot (film), a 2016 Canadian short drama film

== See also ==
- Dyke (disambiguation)
- Fag (disambiguation)
- Fagg (disambiguation)
- Faget (disambiguation)
- Fagot (disambiguation)
- Homo (disambiguation)
- Queer (disambiguation)
