= Tobacco use in South Africa =

Tobacco use among South Africans is fairly common, with a Statistics South Africa (Stats SA) census report released by the Department of Health in 2021 stating that 29.4% of the population used tobacco in some form.

South Africa has strong anti-smoking laws to protect the health of the general public. It is against the law to sell tobacco to minors, and the advertising and promotion of tobacco products in any setting is strictly prohibited. Cigarette packaging features health warnings. Smoking is prohibited in most indoor public places, all partially-enclosed public spaces, as well as some outdoor areas, and anywhere where there are persons under the age of eighteen years present (including inside private vehicles).

There are strict penalties for anyone who violates the smoking laws, including fines of up to R50,000. South Africa has a national agency for tobacco control. The country also launched a free helpline (011 720 3145) for callers seeking assistance with quitting smoking.

Cigarettes may be sold only in designated areas within stores, and many stores that sell them do so behind a counter or at a separate designated tobacco counter. In accordance with the law, these sales areas do not display advertising for tobacco-related products. Vending machines that sell tobacco products may not be used to dispense other products, such as snacks or beverages.

Smoking, in particular, has decreased largely due to the increase in the precaution of the dangers of smoking and enforcement of stricter legislation on the tobacco industry. Despite the efforts to bring awareness to the risks that come with smoking, there is still a significant prevalence of tobacco use across in South Africa, and it is a major contributor to morbidity and mortality.

Vaping at schools in South Africa is quite common, despite widespread knowledge around the harm it causes, both to those who vape and by passive smoking. Children often start vaping due to social influences, and then continue to do so even once those influences are gone. Many start vaping due to the perception that it would be "fun", "due to the flavours", and "because someone asked them to join in".

As of 2024, over one-third (36.4%) of high school students in South Africa had tried vaping, and 16.8% were actively vaping. The majority of individuals who were actively vaping started doing so between the ages of 14 and 16. In terms of other forms of tobacco use and smoking, 2% smoked cigarettes, 3% used hookah, and 5% used cannabis. There is no discernible difference in vaping across schools of varying affluence.

In keeping with its overall progressive style of governance and legislation, in 2000, South Africa became one of the first countries in the world to ban smoking in public places, when the country introduced its Tobacco Products Control Amendment Act. In 2003, South Africa was one of the first signatories to the World Health Organization's (WHO) Framework Convention on Tobacco Control (FCTC).

== Statistics ==
=== Overall tobacco use ===
According to a 2021 study, the rate of tobacco use in general, across South Africa, was 29.4%. This includes all forms of tobacco usage, including via cigarettes, vapes (e-cigarettes), tobacco patches, chewing tobacco, heated tobacco products, dissolvable tobacco, nicotine pouches, snus (a pouch placed under the tongue), hookah (shisha/waterpipe), and pipes. Most individuals used smoked products, as shown in the table below.

Tobacco usage by type (2021)
Type of tobacco usage	Percentage of South African tobacco users who reported using this type
Smoked products only	85.3%
Smokeless products only	12.1%
Both smoked and smokeless products	2.5%
Smoked and heated products simultaneously	0.1%

The study reported that tobacco use among men is more than double that of women, with 41.7% of men and 17.9% of women using tobacco in some form.

=== Smoking ===
In 1996, the provinces with the highest prevalence of smoking were the Northern Cape (55%), Western Cape (48%), and North West (46%).

In 2021, these statistics had decreased significantly, with the provinces with the highest smoking rates being the Northern Cape (42.3%), Western Cape (36.9%), and Free State (30.8%). The tobacco smoking prevalence across South Africa averaged 25.8% (41.2% men and 11.5% women). Of those individuals, most smoked daily (21.2%), as compared to occasional smokers (4.6%).

Map of South Africa, showing the country's 9 provinces

Smoking prevalence across South African provinces in 2021.: 10-20%; 21-30%; 31-40%; 41-50%

The rates published in the 2021 study for all provinces are presented below.

Prevalence of tobacco smoking by province (2021)
Province	Tobacco use by smoking
Northern Cape	42.3%
Western Cape	36.9%
Free State	30.8%
Eastern Cape	29.2%
North West	26.5%
Gauteng	23.1%
Mpumalanga	22.2%
KwaZulu-Natal	21.7%
Limpopo	13.6%

==== Demographics ====
A 2021 study on tobacco usage showed some demographic correlations for smoking.

For instance, rates of daily smoking decreased considerably the higher the level of education attained, showing an inverse proportionate relationship from no formal education (23.9%), to some formal education (23.5%), to secondary education completed (19.1%), and finally to university or college education completed (17.1%).

In terms of age groups, daily rates of daily smoking were most common amongst those aged 25 through 64, and most common in the 45 through 64 year age category. Daily smoking was least common in the 15- 24 year age category; occasional smoking was the most common in this age category, by a substantial margin.

A higher percentage of urban residents were daily smokers than those in rural areas.

In terms of wealth, 25.7% of those in the "lowest" wealth category were daily smokers, 15.9% in the "low" category, 26% in the "middle" category, 19.1% in the "high" category, and 21.4% in the "highest" wealth category, showing no discernible pattern for daily smoking rates as wealth increased. However, far fewer wealthy individuals were occasional smokers than those in the lowest wealth category (3.7% vs 6.7%, respectively).

=== Expenditure and source ===
Median values showed that South Africans who smoked manufactured cigarettes spent around R3,200 per year on them, with men spending more than women.

The top 5 brands bought by South African consumers were Peter Stuyvesant, Remington Gold, Dunhill, Savannah, and Sahawi.

A majority (77.1%) of young respondents (aged 15 through 24 years) who smoked reported purchasing manufactured cigarettes at spaza shops/kiosks.

British American Tobacco (BAT), which has offices in South Africa, dominated the country's cigarette market in 2021, holding 63.3% of the market share. In the same year, over 16.6 billion cigarettes were sold in the country.

=== Vaping (e-cigarettes) ===
In the 2021 study referred to above, just 2.2% of South Africans used electronic cigarettes (vapes), and only 6.2% had ever used them.

Regarding the reasons for using them, 70.3% of individuals cited enjoyment, 67.5% cited likeable flavors, 45.1% cited perceiving e-cigarettes as less harmful than traditional cigarettes, and 43.5% cited significant others (e.g., family members or friends) using them.

Among those using vapes, 41.8% used ones containing nicotine. Many users were unaware of whether or not the products they use contain nicotine.

In terms of cost, 29.3% of adults who used vapes reported spending more than R100 on them in the past month. Among individuals aged 25–44 years, 35.1% reported spending more than R100 in the past month.

Vaping at schools in South Africa is fairly common, despite knowledge being widely available about the harm it causes, both to those who vape, and those around them. Children often start vaping due to social influences, and then continue to do so even once those influences are gone. Many start vaping due to the perception that it would be "fun", "due to the flavors", and "because someone asked them to join in".

As per a 2024 study, 36.4% of high school students in South Africa had tried vaping, and 16.8% were actively vaping. The majority of individuals who were actively vaping started doing so between the ages of 14 and 16. In terms of other forms of tobacco use and smoking, 2% smoked cigarettes, 3% used hookah, and 5% used cannabis. There is no discernible difference in vaping between schools of different levels of wealth.

The same study showed that the incidence of vaping increased proportionally with grade, with vaping in grade 8 as high as 36.8% at some schools and in grade 12 as high as 46.6% (almost half of the total student body) at some schools. Vaping is slightly higher among students at lower-fee schools than among those at higher-fee schools.

25% of students vape within 5 minutes of waking up. A further 52% vape within an hour of waking. In terms of vaping frequency, 38.34% of students vaped 7 days per week, with around half of students (48.75%) vaping 5 days per week or more.

The proportion of students who vape is highest in the Western Cape province, at 17.87%, followed by Gauteng, at 17.56%. The provinces with the lowest incidence of vaping were KwaZulu-Natal (13.35%) and the Eastern Cape (15.86%).

== Health effects ==
As more significant studies are published on smoking and second hand inhalation of smoke, the South African public has become more educated on the dangers of smoking. This has led to the overall decline in the number of smokers and thus the number of related deaths. Currently, approximately 50,000 South Africans die per year due to the effects smoking such as an increased risk for lung cancer and cardiovascular disease.

In 2000, approximately 34,108 males and 10,306 females died due to the various consequences of smoking. According to the latest South African National Health and Nutrition Examination Survey in 2012, only about 16.4% of South Africans smoked, which is a substantial drop from 32% in 1993.

This decrease is attributed to legislation that led to restrictions on advertising and an increase in tobacco prices. However, a Youth Risk Behavior Survey found that 21% of students in grades 8-11 smoke. This shows little to no change between 2002 and 2008.

== Public perception ==
There is a high level of awareness regarding the adverse health effects of smoking amongst the general population of South Africa, and this awareness is consistent across various demographic factors, such as age, gender, residence, level of education, and current smoking status.

== Smoking cessation ==
As of a 2021 survey, 48.1% of those who formerly smoked daily had quit 10 or more years ago. 11.7% had quit within the 12 months preceding the survey. 65.7% of those who used tobacco in 2021 were hoping to quit. Among adults who smoked tobacco and those who had been abstinent for less than 12 months, 40.5% had made at least one attempt to quit smoking (40.7% of men and 39.7% of women).

== Legislation ==
=== Summary of smoking laws ===
South Africa has strong anti-tobacco laws to protect public health. These laws apply countrywide. Under the enshrined smoking legislation, the sale of tobacco to minors is not allowed, and the advertising and promotion of tobacco products anywhere is strictly prohibited. Cigarette packaging features health warnings to inform consumers of the hazards related to smoking. Tobacco products must be packaged in plain, uniform packaging and include pictorial warnings.

Furthermore, smoking is prohibited in most indoor places (an exception is made for separated, designated areas that have adequate ventilation); all partially-enclosed public spaces, such as covered walkways, patios, verandas, and parking areas; as well as some outdoor areas, including sports stadiums, playgrounds, zoos, school premises, healthcare facilities, and beaches (within 50 meters of the swimming area). Smoking is also banned in all workplaces, on all forms of public transport, and anywhere where there are persons under the age of 18 present (including inside private vehicles, even with ventilation). There are strict penalties for both smokers and venue operators who violate the smoking laws, including fines of up to R50,000.

Additionally, cigarettes can only be sold in designated areas within stores, and many stores that sell them do so behind the checkout counter or at a separate tobacco counter. In accordance with the law, these sales areas do not display advertising for tobacco-related products. Vending machines that sell tobacco products may not be used to dispense other products, such as snacks or beverages.

=== The Tobacco Products Control Act (1993) ===
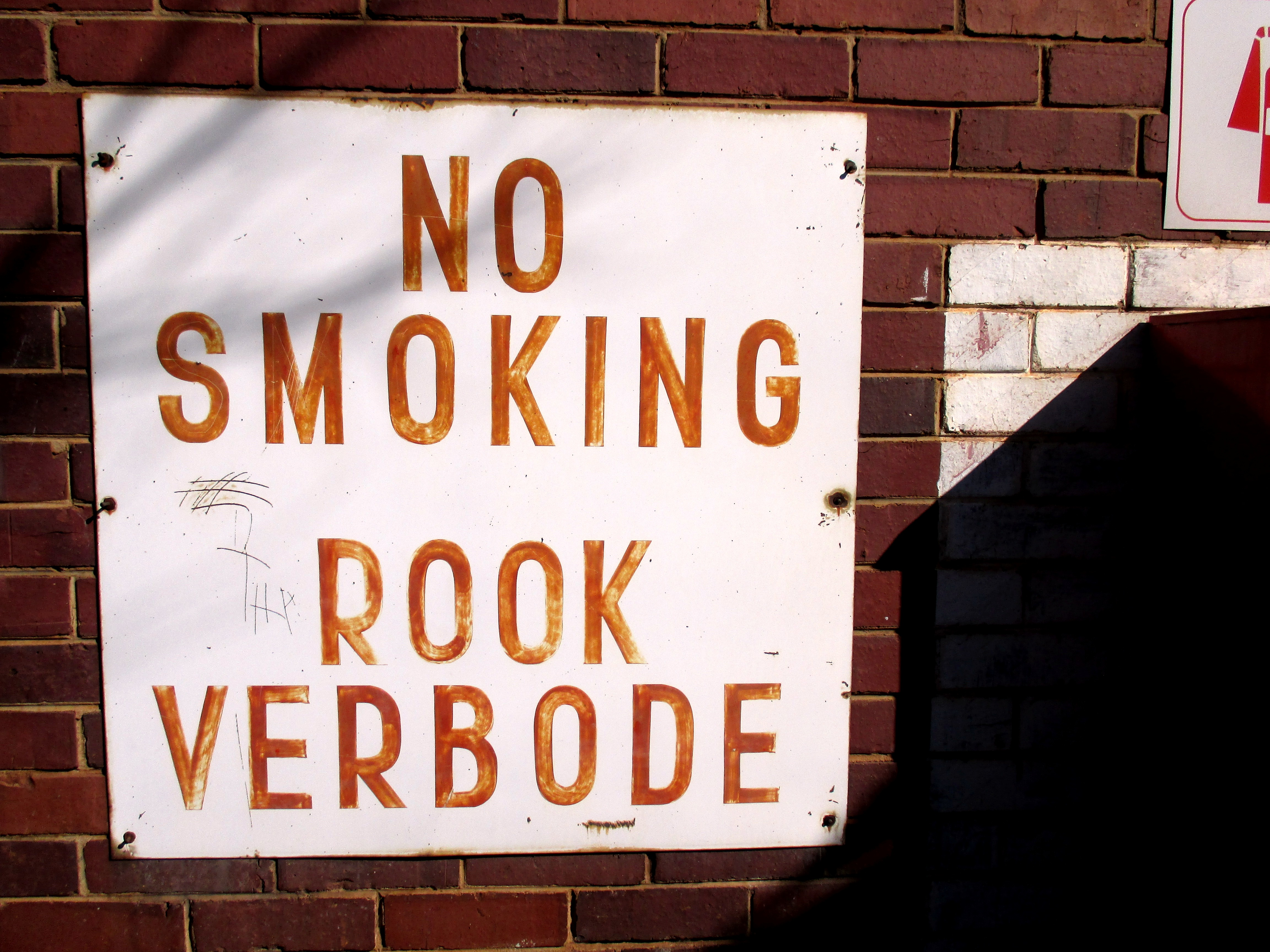
Bilingual (English and Afrikaans) "No Smoking" sign used to prevent public smoking in South Africa

To combat the dangers of smoking, legislation has been increasingly put into place to deter the public from smoking. Beginning in 1993 with the Tobacco Products Control Act, South Africa began to pass legislation to protect the public. It was fully implemented and enforced in 1995, thereby partially regulating smoking in public places.

In addition, the act prohibited some aspects of advertisement, the promotion of tobacco products, and the publicity of a sponsorship. Merchandise containing tobacco may be visible when being sold, however customers are not allowed to handle the products before the purchase. Labeling was limited in some aspects; however, it was not heavily regulated until 1999.

Notably the act prohibited the sale of tobacco products to minors under the age of 16.

=== The Tobacco Products Control Amendment Act (1999) ===
The Tobacco Products Control Act of 1993 was considered to be incomplete, and in 1999, the South African government passed the Tobacco Products Control Amendment Act. This led to stricter regulations on public smoking and banned smoking in public places such as restaurants, workplaces, and public transport.

Set in motion in 2001, the act prohibits all forms of tobacco advertising and promotion. Additionally, the act suggests penalties for those who transgress the law. The act also places a limit on the permissible levels of nicotine and tar.

The act made South Africa one of the first countries in the world to ban smoking in public places.

== Global frameworks ==
South Africa became a party to the World Health Organization's (WHO) Framework Convention on Tobacco Control on 18 July 2005.

=== New legislation ===
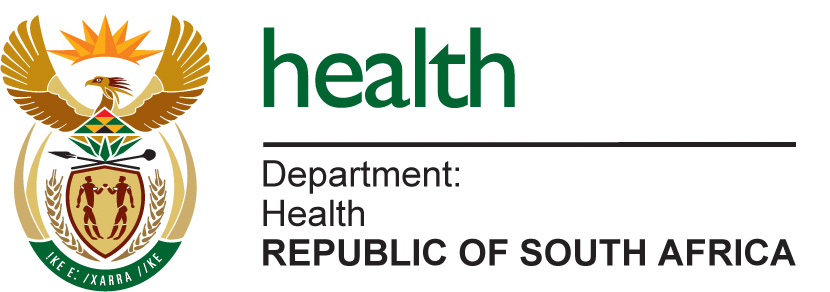
New legislation to reduce the prevalence of tobacco use in South Africa falls under the mandate of the Department of Health

In July 2024, a new anti-smoking bill was introduced by the South African administration (the Second Cabinet of Cyril Ramaphosa). Its overall aim is to align South African law with World Health Organization obligations, and to modernize regulations, so that they can deal with emerging means of tobacco use, like e-cigarettes.

In May 2025, the South African government and representatives from labor, business, and communities at the National Economic Development and Labour Council (NEDLAC) - a child agency of the Department of Employment and Labour, announced that they wanted to add another punishable offence: the sale of tobacco products at discounted prices.

During consultations relating to the bill, the business community proposed allowing vapes to be used in designated areas (set at a maximum of 25% of the space of a venue). However, the proposal failed, with government, labor, and community representatives finding that second-hand vape emissions are harmful, and the bill aims to eliminate all designated smoking areas in business establishments, to protect public health.

As of September 2025, the Tobacco Products and Electronic Delivery Systems Control Bill was still pending enactment. South African tobacco industry stalwarts, such as British American Tobacco South Africa and Philip Morris, lobbied for separate, less stringent legislation for e-cigarettes (vapes). However, the bill has remained in its original form and will close gaps in health regulations between cigarettes and vapes.

=== Health warnings ===
South African cigarette manufacturers are mandated to display prominent health warnings on the packaging of their products, with the aim of dissuading smokers from using them. The country also has legislation preventing tobacco companies from using deceptive terms to market their products.

80% of South African adults, as of 2021, had noticed tobacco health warnings on cigarette packaging.

== Other measures ==
As part of its effort to reduce tobacco use, the Government of South Africa established a national agency for tobacco control. The government also launched a free helpline (011 720 3145) for individuals seeking assistance with quitting smoking.

== Public health recommendations ==
Considerable effort has already been undertaken by the South African government, including through public health campaigns, to reduce tobacco use among the general public. And, significant progress has been made in this regard since the 1990s.

The 2021 Global Adult Tobacco Survey's South Africa Report, released by the country's Department of Health, recommended numerous measures for reducing tobacco use in South Africa.
