= Fagg (surname) =

Fagg is a surname. Notable people with the surname include:

- Arthur Fagg, (1915–1977), English cricketer
- Bernard Fagg (1915–1987), British archaeologist and museum curator
- Fred D. Fagg, Jr., President of the University of Southern California from 1947 to 1957
- Fred D. Fagg III (1934–2002), law school dean
- George Gardner Fagg (1934–2015), US federal judge
- Harrison Fagg (born 1931), American politician
- Jimmy Fagg (1929–2010), English stand-up comedian, musician and actor
- Sir John Fagg, 1st Baronet (1627–1701), English politician
- Keith Fagg (born 1955), Australian businessman and politician
- Kenneth S. Fagg (1901–1980), American commercial artist
- Peter Fagg (1837–1917), American politician
- Russell Fagg, (born 1960), American judge and politician
- Thomas Fagg, English MP
- William Buller Fagg (1914–1992), British art historian and museum keeper

== See also ==
- Mae Faggs (1932–2000), American athlete
