= Queer (disambiguation) =

Queer is an umbrella term for sexual and gender minorities.

Queer or Queers may also refer to:

== Arts and entertainment ==
- Queer (novel), by William S. Burroughs, 1985
  - Queer (film), a 2024 film adaptation of the novel
- Queer (Thompson Twins album), 1991
- Queer (The Wolfgang Press album), 1991
- "Queer" (song), by Garbage, 1995
- "Queer", a song by Arca featuring Planningtorock from Kick IIII, 2021
- "Queer", a song by Brockhampton from Saturation II
- Queers (TV series), a 2017 British TV drama
- The Queers, an American punk rock band

== Places ==
- Queer Creek (disambiguation)
- Queer Island, Alaska, U.S.
- Queer Lake, New York, U.S.
- Queer Mountain, Victoria Land, Antarctica

== See also ==
- Queer Eye, a TV franchise giving lifestyle advice and fashion makeover
- Genderqueer, or non-binary gender
