= Fagg =

Fagg or FAGG may refer to:

- Fagg (surname)
- Fagg, Virginia, an unincorporated community in the U.S.
- George Airport's ICAO code
- Federal Agency for Medicines and Health Products, a Belgian regulatory agency

== See also ==
- Fagge baronets
- Faggs Manor, Pennsylvania, an unincorporated community in the US
- Fag (disambiguation)
