= Weed World Candies =

American lollipop retailer

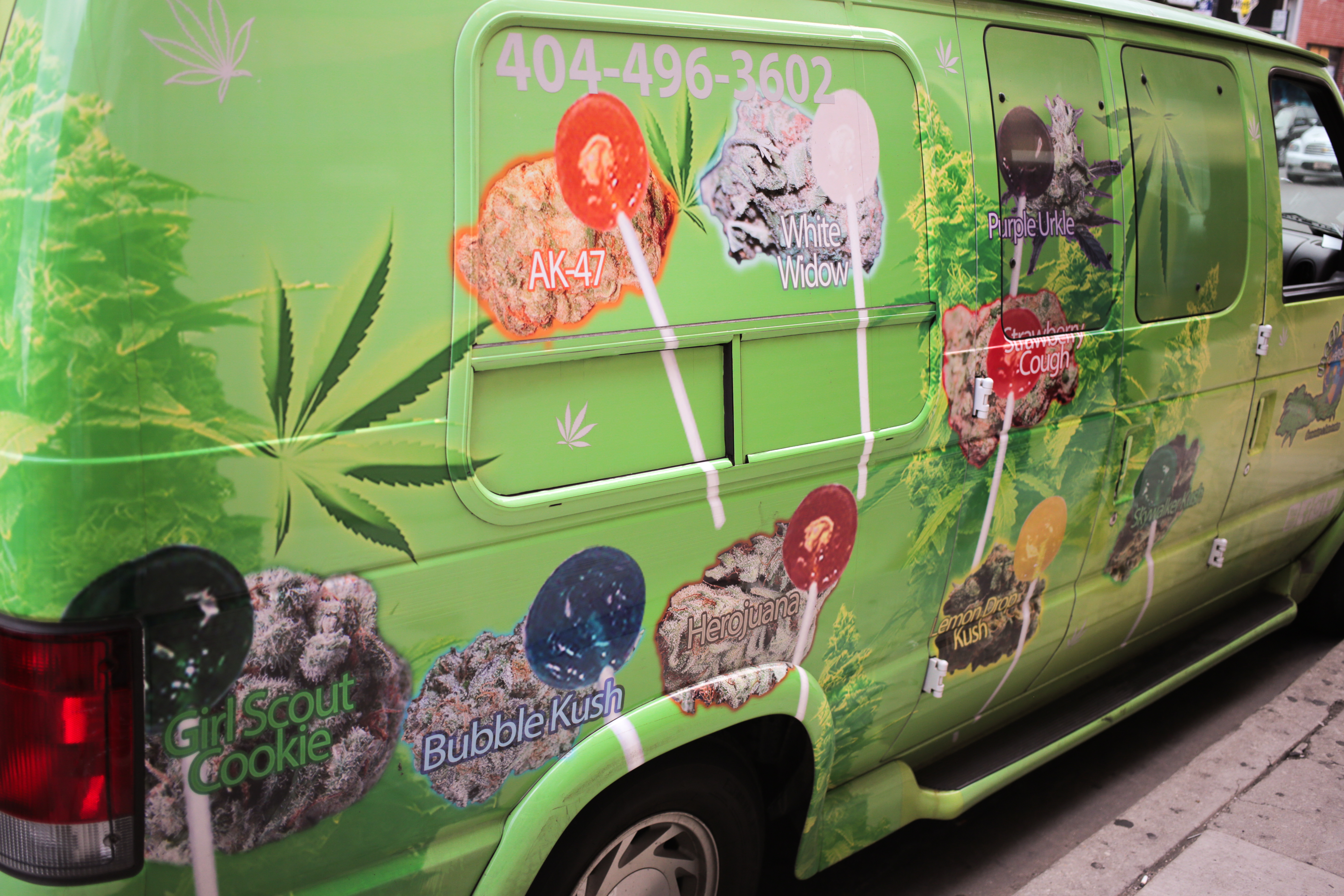
- A Weed World Candies van in Chicago
- Industry: Confectionery
- Area served: United States

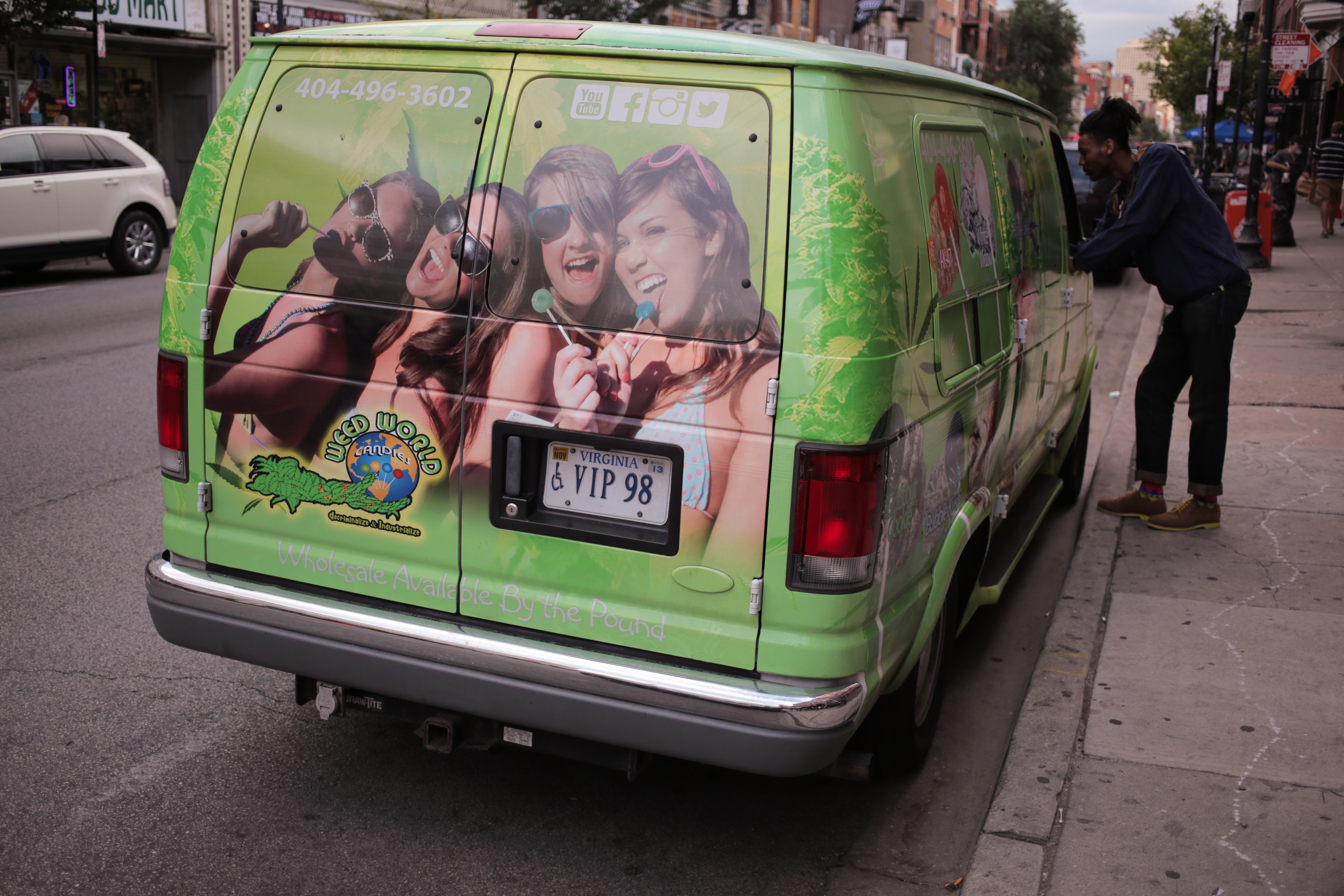
A Weed World Candies van in Chicago. While the candy sold from the vans does not contain CBD, the advertising on the vans also show cannabis plants next to lollipops.

Weed World Candies sells lollipops. The lollipops are marketed and sold in vans across the United States. With advertising on the vans depicting cannabis plants next to lollipops, strong euphemism suggests a cannabis flavor or the possibility of intoxication after eating the lollipops. The candy sold from the vans does not contain THC.

== See also ==
- Candy cigarette
- Hippy Sippy
- Gateway drug effect
- Joe Camel
