= Candy stick (disambiguation) =

A candy stick or stick candy is a long, cylindrical hard candy with different colors and flavors swirled together.

Candy stick may also refer to:

- a candy cigarette
- Micrurus fulvius, also known as the eastern coral snake, a venomous elapid found in the United States.
