= What They Did to Princess Paragon =

Book by Robert Rodi

- What They Did to Princess Paragon, a novel by Robert Rodi
- Author: Robert Rodi
- Language: English
- Genre: Humor
- Publisher: Dutton Penguin
- Publication date: 1 May 1994
- Publication place: United States
- Media type: Print (hardcover)
- Pages: 288 pages (1st edition)
- ISBN: 0-525-93772-2 (hardcover edition)
- OCLC: 29312496
- Dewey Decimal: 813/.54 20
- LC Class: PS3568.O34854 W43 1994

What They Did to Princess Paragon is a humor novel by Robert Rodi, which tells the story of what happens when a venerable comic book superheroine is retconned as a lesbian.

== Plot summary ==
Gay comic book creator Brian Parrish is hired by Bang Comics to take over Princess Paragon, a superhero comic book that's been around since the 1940s, but whose sales are slumping badly by the 1990s. Parrish decides to reimagine Princess Paragon as a lesbian, a move which causes quite a bit of excitement and publicity for Bang, but also causes consternation among some of the fan base. One deranged fanboy in particular, Jerome T. Kornacker, is so outraged that his favorite superheroine is being "perverted," that he takes radical steps to stop the change.

== Reception ==
Publishers Weekly considered the novel to be "(t)ightly plotted and consistently amusing", "more farce than satire", and a "campy, breezy read" with "cartoonish" characters. Kirkus Reviews similarly lauded Rodi's plotting, but overall found the book to be "frothy", with "weak" characterization, stereotypes, and a "formula (that) is wearing thin" (noting in particular that this was the third novel by Rodi to feature a kidnapping). Comic Book Resources praised it as "hilarious", "fall-down funny", and "terrific" for its portrayal of fans' "dark suspicions of what editors are really thinking" — and of editors' "nightmare of what hardcore fans are capable of".

== Publication history ==
- 1994, USA, E. P. Dutton ISBN 0-525-93772-2, Pub date 1 May 1994, hardcover
- 1995, USA, Plume ISBN 0-452-27163-0, Pub date 1 May 1995, paperback
