= Fagot =

Fagot may refer to:

- Fagot (surname)
- 9K111 Fagot, a Soviet anti-tank missile system
- NATO report name for the Soviet Mikoyan-Gurevich MiG-15 turbojet fighter
- Bassoon

== See also ==
- Faggot (disambiguation)
- Fag (disambiguation)
