= Fag hag (disambiguation) =

Fag hag is a gay slang phrase referring to a woman who either associates mostly or exclusively with gay and bisexual men, or has gay and bisexual men as close friends.

Fag hag may refer to:

- Fag Hag (novel), a 1991 novel by Robert Rodi
- Fag Hag (film), a 1998 film directed by Damion Dietz
- Okoge, also known as Fag Hag, a 1992 Japanese film
- "Fag Hag", a B-side song by Lily Allen from "The Fear"

== See also ==
- Miss Fag Hag Pageant
