= Codename: Knockout =

Comic book series

Publication information
- Publisher: Vertigo imprint of DC Comics
- Schedule: Monthly
- Format: Ongoing series
- Publication date: June 2001 – June 2003
- No. of issues: 24 (#0–23)
- Main character(s): Angela St. Grace (a.k.a. "Codename: Knockout")

Creative team
- Created by: Robert Rodi; Louis Small Jr.
- Written by: Robert Rodi
- Artist(s): Louis Small, Jr. (#1–5); Amanda Conner (#6, 9, 13–14); Yanick Paquette (#7–8, 10–12); Phil Jimenez (#12); Ed Benes (#15–18); Mark A. Robinson (#19–20); John Lucas (#21–23)
- Editor(s): Tony Bedard (#1–6); Will Dennis (#7–23)

Collected editions
- The Devil You Say: ISBN 1-4012-2798-8

Codename: Knockout is a comic book series published by the Vertigo imprint of DC Comics for 24 issues (numbered #0–23) between June 2001 and June 2003. It was created by writer Robert Rodi and artist Louis Small, Jr.

The title was a "mature readers" comedy series featuring absurdist espionage plots and artwork heavily inspired by the good girl art of the 1950s and 1960s.

== Publication history ==
Rodi wrote each issue of the title. Small left the series after #5 and was replaced by an assortment of artists including Amanda Conner (#6, 9, 13, 14), Yanick Paquette (#7, 8, 10, 11, 12), Phil Jimenez (#12), Ed Benes (#15–18), Mark A. Robinson (#19, 20) and John Lucas (#21–23).

Each issue had a painted cover, and many were by high-profile comic book artists including Joe Chiodo, J. G. Jones, Phil Noto, Brian Stelfreeze, J. Scott Campbell, and Jim Lee.

The title was first conceived under editor Axel Alonso, though Tony Bedard went on to edit the first 6 issues; Bedard was succeeded by Will Dennis who edited the title until its cancellation.

== Plot summary ==
The premise of the series follows the adventures of buxom blonde Angela St. Grace (the "Codename: Knockout" of the title) a secret agent and operative for the "G.O.O.D." (Global Organization for the Obliteration of Dastardliness) organization as she battled the nefarious agents of "E.V.I.L." (Extralegal Vendors of Iniquity and Licentiousness).

She is assisted by her partner Go Go Fiasco, a young, handsome, gay fellow agent and by her mother Celeste St. Grace, the leader of the G.O.O.D. organization.

== Collected editions ==
Part of the series has been collected into a trade paperback:

- Codename: Knockout: The Devil You Say (collects issues #0-6, 160 pages, DC Comics, May 2010, ISBN 1-4012-2798-8, Titan Books, August 2010, ISBN 1-84856-878-9)

== Film adaptation ==
In 2001, Louis Small, Jr. reported that Warner Bros. had picked up the option to adapt the series into film.
