= Vulture (Marvel Comics) =

Marvel Comics fictional character

- The Vulture / Adrian Toomes as seen in interior artwork from The Amazing Spider-Man Annual #1 (October 1964). Art by Steve Ditko.

Publication information
- Publisher: Marvel Comics
- First appearance: Isidoro Scarlotti: Young Men #26 (December 1953); Adrian Toomes: The Amazing Spider-Man #2 (May 1963); Blackie Drago: The Amazing Spider-Man #48 (February 1967); Clifton Shallot: The Amazing Spider-Man #127 (February 1973); Jimmy Natale: The Amazing Spider-Man #592 (April 2009)
- Created by: Stan Lee; Steve Ditko

In-story information
- Alter ego: Isidoro Scarlotti; Adrian Toomes; Blackie Drago; Clifton Shallot; Jimmy Natale
- Team affiliations: Sinister Six; Orchis; Savage Six
- Notable aliases: Director Vulture; Falcon
- Abilities: Genius-level intellect; Electromagnetic harness grants: Superhuman strength and durability; Flight; Youth vampirism; Razor-sharp wings; Feather projection

The Vulture is the alias of several supervillains appearing in American comic books published by Marvel Comics. Most are depicted as enemies of the superhero Spider-Man and are characterized by their advanced suits that enable them to fly and bear resemblance to their namesake.

The first incarnation of the character, Isidoro Scarlotti, is an Italian scientist who wears a mechanized vulture mask, lacks the ability to fly, and debuted as an enemy of the original Human Torch and Toro. The second and most famous incarnation, Adrian Toomes, is an inventive but maniacal genius who designed his flight suit and turned to a life of crime, becoming a recurring enemy of Spider-Man and a founding member of the Sinister Six. Later characters to assume the mantle include Blackie Drago, a former cellmate of Toomes who stole his Vulture suit, and Clifton Shallot and Jimmy Natale, human/bird hybrids of independent origins. Toomes was later revealed to be the grandfather of the superhero Starling.

Since his conception, the character has been adapted from comics into various other forms of Spider-Man media, including television series and video games. In live-action, Adrian Toomes was played by Michael Keaton in the Marvel Cinematic Universe (MCU) film Spider-Man: Homecoming (2017) and the Sony's Spider-Man Universe (SSU) film Morbius (2022).

== Publication history ==
The first Vulture, Italian scientist Isidoro Scarlotti, first appeared in Young Men #26 (December 1953), created by Joe Gill and Carl Burgos and depicted as an enemy of the original Human Torch and Toro.

The second Vulture, Adrian Toomes, first appeared in The Amazing Spider-Man #2 (May 1963), and was created by Stan Lee and Steve Ditko. According to Ditko, Lee wanted the villain to be heavy-set and based on actor Sydney Greenstreet. Ditko designed him to be leaner and more gaunt, feeling he should be swift and fast and also because "The bulkier anything is, the more panel space it has to take up, thereby shrinking panel space for other characters and story panel elements."

Since Toomes originally assumed the Vulture alias as an enemy of Spider-Man, several other character have taken on the mantle from him. The third incarnation, Blackie Drago, first appeared in The Amazing Spider-Man #48 (May 1967), and was created by Stan Lee and John Romita Sr. Lee created the new version because he thought that Spider-Man looked like a bully fighting a wizened old man. However, the readers wrote in that they did not like the new Vulture, and Lee relented and brought the original back.

The fourth incarnation, Clifton Shallot, first appeared in The Amazing Spider-Man #127, and was created by Ross Andru, Gerry Conway, and John Romita Sr.

A fifth incarnation, Jimmy Natale, first appeared in The Amazing Spider-Man #593 as part of the story arc "Spider-Man 24/7"; created by Mark Waid and Mike McKone, he is a recurring enemy of both Spider-Man and the Punisher.

== Fictional character biography ==
=== Isidoro Scarlotti ===
Isidoro Scarlotti was born in Italy and attained a doctorate in theoretical physics. Craving power and wealth, he rose to become czar of the "International League of Criminals", constructing a series of "super atomic bombs" with which to hold the world ransom, and wearing a mechanized vulture mask as the "Vulture" to conceal his identity.

In an attempt at preventing the flaming heroes Human Torch and Toro from interfering with his plans, Vulture builds robot duplicates of the heroes programmed to commit crimes and murders in order to discredit them; when the Torch and Toro arrive at their boss Chief Wilson's office, they learn that Vulture has kidnapped his daughter Mary, with his trademark Vulture plane spotted en-route to New Mexico. Following it to Vulture's hideout and melting through its walls, they are confronted by Vulture, who traps them with a wall of ionized radiation deflecting their fire powers, leaving Mary behind to watch them die. After the radiation-proof Torch is able to save them, the Torch and Toro return to Chief Wilson's office and stop their Vulture-made robotic duplicates from killing the Chief, before learning of Vulture's ransom demand to the world's governments and rushing back to his base in New Mexico, trashing his equipment. On revealing his identity, Vulture traps the heroes in his base again, which begins to fill with corrosive acid. After revealing he has set the atomic pile in his base to explode, Vulture flees, with the Torch and Toro barely able to escape in time, the Torch believing it to be far from the last they will hear of Vulture.

Vulture next kidnaps and kills roboticist Professor Costene in order to obtain his "robot formula", using it to create a wave of crime robots, the largest of which he names Metallo. When the Torch and Toro arrive to investigate Costene's disappearance, they encounter Vulture's robots and manage to defeat them by luring them into the swamp to be short-circuited by water. On getting to Vulture's hideout, they battle Metallo and free Vulture's hostage Betty Wilson (the chief's other daughter) as Vulture gets away.

Later, Vulture sabotages a testing site for a new rocket to take men to the moon, with the Torch and Toro learning he has constructed his own rocket in Canada. Rushing up north to the secret location of Vulture's hideout, the Torch and Toro ambush the criminal and his minions and destroy the rocket. Vulture and his men attempt to escape by plane with the two heroes in pursuit, only for Vulture to unleash a fire-dousing chemical that stops them from following him. On returning to the United States, the heroes encounter Vulture taking Betty Wilson hostage again in an attempt to reach the Moon first, blasting off in the rocket only for the pursuing heroes to board through the rocket thrusters and knock Vulture and his men out. The ship is then stopped by aliens calling themselves the "Guardians of Space", who tell the Torch that mankind is not ready for travel into space until they forsake war. As the Vulture knows of their existence, he is taken into deep space and never seen again.

=== Adrian Toomes ===
Adrian Toomes was born in Staten Island, New York. A skilled electronics engineer, Toomes is the business partner of Gregory Bestman, working on various inventions. After much trial and error, Toomes created a "flight harness" from scrap parts, but when he visited Bestman to show off his invention, he discovered that his partner had embezzled their profits and fled, leaving Toomes penniless. Enraged, Toomes wrecked the business and realized the physical strength he gained from using the harness. He then decided to turn to crime professionally as Vulture.

Vulture employs a special electromagnetic harness of his own design that allows him to fly; his flight is directed by a pair of artificial wings worn on his arms. The harness also endows him with enhanced strength and (according to some sources) increases his lifespan. Although Toomes is advanced in age, he is a strong fighter and a remorseless killer. On one occasion, he restored his youth through biochemical means, though this wore off after exposure to an elemental superhuman's corpse. At one point, he had used a device to steal Spider-Man's youth, leaving Vulture young and Spider-Man elderly, but this effect wore off within hours.

Vulture was on a robbery and burglary spree throughout New York City when he first encountered Spider-Man. Spider-Man realized for the first time he could sell photos to J. Jonah Jameson after the Daily Bugle offered a reward for a picture of Vulture. Due to a preoccupation with the camera, Spider-Man was knocked out by Vulture and sealed in a water tank with sides too slippery to climb up, but was able to break free. Vulture then challenged the police, saying he was going to steal diamonds; however, he escaped through the sewers. Spider-Man had created a device that stopped Vulture's harness from working and activated it during an airborne fight with Vulture, causing the two to crash onto a roof, knocking Vulture unconscious. He was then arrested. Vulture modified his harness, and attempted to rob the Daily Bugle payroll. He joined Doctor Octopus's first Sinister Six, and gave the message to the Daily Bugle that the group had captured Betty Brant. He was the last foe to battle Spider-Man before Doctor Octopus. He forced Spider-Man to remove the web-shooters by threatening to fly away, then squirted oil onto the roof, and tried to push Spider-Man off using a wind created by his wings, but Spider-Man escaped this. Vulture was caught after Spider-Man swung onto him using a lasso. He then told Spider-Man where to find Doctor Octopus's lair and (like the rest of the team) was jailed at the end of the story.

Later, believing himself to be dying in prison due to injuries obtained in the prison workshop, Toomes revealed an extra Vulture outfit's location on the prison grounds to his cellmate Blackie Drago. Drago revealed to Toomes he caused the accident for this very purpose. Toomes was angry, but apparently fell unconscious within the next few minutes; Blackie then knocked out a guard, dug up the wings, and escaped. Drago, as Vulture, teamed with Kraven the Hunter against Spider-Man. Toomes ultimately escaped from prison and recovered from his injuries – crediting his hatred for Drago's betrayal with the strength to overcome them – and as Vulture again, defeating Drago. Toomes then nearly defeated Spider-Man in battle, injuring the arm before Spider-Man managed to play possum and tricked Toomes into coming in close enough for Spider-Man to damage his power pack and force his nemesis to retreat. Some time later, Dr. Clifton Shallot mutated his body into a form resembling Toomes's, but possessing natural wings and flight capability.

Vulture came out of retirement to claim vengeance on his former research partner Bestman who embezzled him out of the profits of their business. He then confronted the Vulturions, a group of criminal youths who stole his designs.

He became involved in Atlantic City casino racketeering to prepare for his own ostentatious funeral, but was thwarted by the Hobgoblin. Reduced to a "mere salesman", he journeyed to Las Vegas, where he attacked Morris "Snake" Diamond in the middle of the desert for stealing Toomes's blueprint journals for ultrasonic-sensitive dice. Intending to inject Snake with a mummification serum, Vulture was thwarted by Spider-Man (who had been granted a flight on Snake's plane back to New York) and Agent Sara Glenville of the Central Intelligence Division. He later confronted the mutants Rusty Collins and Skids in an attempt to release Nitro.

On more than one occasion, Toomes has been in league with several of Spider-Man's other villains to destroy him. Vulture has been in every incarnation of Sinister Six, and also appeared in the ranks of the Sinister Twelve. He has a strong friendship with fellow villain Electro; the two once nearly beat Spider-Man to death.

During one of his many periods of ill health, Toomes struck up a friendship with Nathan Lubensky, a man who had become the new love of May Parker's life. Nathan was unaware of Toomes's true identity, and encouraged the injured criminal to take chances with life and not to let handicaps drag him down. Toomes followed Nathan's advice and went on a crime spree as Vulture while hiding out in his civilian identity at the same nursing home Nathan lived in, reasoning that the authorities would never think to look for him there. After Peter Parker visited the nursing home and recognized him, however, a battle ensued between Vulture and Spider-Man. During the course of the fight, Toomes instinctively grabbed a hostage and threatened to kill him if Spider-Man did not back down; however, as soon as Toomes realized that the hostage was Nathan, he decided he could not take the life of a man who had helped to save his own. He shoved Nathan's wheelchair at Spider-Man, distracting the web-slinger long enough for Toomes to make his getaway.

Vulture would seemingly cherish Nathan's influence, but irony would serve him a cruel blow when he was hired by the Kingpin to assassinate a high-ranking casino runner. During another conflict with Spider-Man just prior to joining Doctor Octopus's new Sinister Six, Vulture sought to use a hostage as a shield, and selected May Parker from the crowd. Nathan, who was with May, leapt from his wheelchair and grabbed Toomes. Not realizing who it was, Toomes flew high into the air with Nathan on his back. The shock of seeing how high they were caused Nathan to suffer a fatal heart attack. Toomes fled as Nathan was falling. Though he was successfully caught by Spider-Man, Nathan would die in May's arms.

Toomes was later diagnosed with cancer, caused by frequent exposure to the essential chemicals needed to power his flying apparatus. In an attempt to be forgiven for all of his previous sins, Vulture terrorized the Parker household, pleading that May Parker forgive him for indirectly causing Nathan's death. The enraged Parker attacked Toomes, forcing Vulture to capture him and take him back to his old lair. After escaping Toomes, Peter switched to Spider-Man and brutally assaulted Vulture, and in the ensuing battle, Vulture's own power pack malfunctioned and exploded, setting his wings ablaze. Spider-Man successfully ripped the burning pack off of Toomes, and the two crash landed in a muddy ditch.

After being arrested, Toomes was returned to the Parker home so May, reunited with Peter, could identify him. May hoped that Toomes' death would be slow and full of suffering. The next day, she visited Toomes in prison and apologized to him for her cruel remarks, but also stated that she could not forgive him, and that any kind of redemption would be left up to him and God.

Vulture stumbled across a plot by Chameleon and Green Goblin (Harry Osborn) to drive Spider-Man insane by having shapeshifting androids impersonate his late mother and father; due to Toomes' interference, the androids were destroyed, leading the wall-crawler to a brief nervous breakdown. Vulture absorbed the artificial life force from the Mary Parker android, and the effect on Vulture was twofold; not only did he become a young man again, but he was instantly cured of his cancer. During this period, he attempted to kill everyone who had ever known him as an old man in an attempt to get a clean slate for his life, but this plan went wrong when he targeted a Prowler impersonator as the Prowler having once thwarted his attempted takeover of his old company; Toomes was unconcerned about the fact that the current Prowler was a thief who had stolen the costume of the original Prowler (Hobie Brown) and Spider-Man; although Toomes nearly gutted the fake Prowler, Spider-Man managed to get him to the hospital. During a later fight with Spider-Man, Vulture was 'attacked' by David Kalen, a man capable of dissolving anything he touched who had turned his power on himself in his grief at the death of his brother. Toomes subsequently reverted to his old age, presumably due to Kalen's power having negated the youth effect. His cancer, however, did not return.

In the Identity Disc series, it was revealed that Toomes, with the help of Sandman, manipulated Bullseye, Deadpool, Juggernaut and Sabretooth into laying siege to terrorist group A.I.M. headquarters to retrieve a disc containing the identities of undercover S.H.I.E.L.D. operatives, including his daughter with wife Cheryl, Valeria Toomes a.k.a. "Valerie Jessup".

During a brief time working for the Owl, he failed in a mission (and had his face brutally slashed by the Black Cat) and was severely beaten as punishment. He subsequently revealed himself as a member of Norman Osborn's Sinister Twelve — though he wore a helmet, presumably to mask the wounds.

Under the tutelage of Alyosha Kravinoff, Toomes briefly attempted a stint at heroism, but before long he returned to villainy.

Aside from his daughter, Toomes also has a son whom he has dismissed, and a grandson from that son. Vulture has come to care deeply for both his grandson and his mother, committing a series of robberies to finance a cure for his grandson's terminal illness. He once had a nephew, Malachai Toomes, and flew into a killing rage when he was murdered by a gang-lord.

During the Civil War, he was apprehended along with Grim Reaper and Trapster, by Captain America and the growing Resistance, who chained him together with Grim Reaper to a pole and broke his nose. When he was found and taken into custody by S.H.I.E.L.D., he complained, "that lunatic broke my damn nose." After Spider-Man unmasked himself, Toomes was seen in his jail cell, knitting his fingers together. As someone on the television set said they hoped it would not be any trouble for Spider-Man, Toomes said, "Oh, I think it will be."

After Spider-Man goes rogue, Toomes is seen in a S.H.I.E.L.D. prison cell speaking with Agent Jamie Madrox, and commenting on Spider-Man's inherent weakness, that being his unwillingness to use his powers for personal gain. S.H.I.E.L.D. then returns his flying harness and encourages him to hunt down Spider-Man, saying that he "is now an outlaw, same as you."

Later, Vulture attacks Spider-Man at a book signing, and manages to slash him with a powerful sedative. Toomes, however, falls unconscious and, sensing something is wrong, Spider-Man rushes him to the hospital. Toomes wakes up a few hours later, where a doctor reveals that he has suffered a stroke, and many of his muscles on the left side of his body have been paralyzed. When the doctor leaves, Spider-Man sneaks in and Toomes asks him to kill him because he is weak. When Spider-Man refuses to do so, he says that Spider-Man is also weak, and always has been. After making remarks about Uncle Ben, Spider-Man takes a pillow and begins suffocating him. He fights back, and Spider-Man removes the pillow, commenting that "For somebody who's begging to die, you fight for life pretty hard."

Following the "Spider-Island"' storyline, Vulture returns as the leader of an unnamed gang of penthouse thieves and murderers who have vulture-like wings, but with a new gothic style. The members of his gang have the same name of an angel that matches with the black angel look they have. However, it is swiftly revealed that the gang's technology is actually controlled by Vulture who designed their wings so that he could shut them down with a simple signal if they tried to act against him. Having used his new magnetically sensitive webbing to catch the gang and deactivate their wings, Spider-Man defeats Toomes despite his new use of his gravity-manipulating technology to give himself seemingly superhuman strength.

Vulture, Chameleon, Electro, Sandman, and Mysterion are later seen as part of a team led by Superior Spider-Man called the "Superior Six", which is forced via mind control to perform heroic (and occasionally dangerous) deeds as an act of "redemption". When they are not being controlled, they are kept in containment cells. They eventually break free of Superior Spider-Man's control and attempt to exact revenge on the wall-crawler, nearly destroying New York in the process. Superior Spider-Man barely manages to stop them with Sun Girl's help.

Adrian Toomes later developed a modified version of his electromagnetic harness that has a reinforced helmet and lightweight, razor-sharp, nano-woven wings which responded to his mental commands, where he took on the Falcon name, which he believed to be vacant at the time. He robbed a location in East Village where he fought Spider-Man, until they were immobilized by a new Trapster who made off with Falcon's loot.

In a prelude to the "Hunted" storyline, Vulture is among the animal-themed characters captured by Taskmaster and Black Ant on Kraven the Hunter's behalf. He and several of the other captives are grouped together by Arcade and publicly revealed as the Savage Six.

Vulture's son Frankie Toomes is married to a woman named Lenora. When Frankie left Lenora, Toomes often visited Lenora and her daughter Tiana to support them. At one point, Vulture took Tiana on a ride in his Vulture suit. After Lenora died from a surgical error, Adrian started to take care of Tiana. As Tiana came to age, Adrian made a suit similar to his so that Tiana can follow whatever destiny awaits. This led to Tiana being Starling.

While Nightcrawler assumed an alias as Spinnenmann and later Creepy Crawler, Vulture is operating as the director at an Orchis facility. In addition, he also upgraded his Vulture harness with a sample taken from Warlock.

=== Blackie Drago ===
Blackie Drago as Vulture. Art by John Romita, Sr.

Raniero "Blackie" Drago was a prison cellmate of Adrian Toomes. He tricked Toomes by causing an accident in the prison workshop that made Toomes think he could die soon, and stole the Vulture harness and costume which was recently rebuilt. He used the suit to make money through air piracy; this led to a confrontation with Spider-Man, which Drago believed ended in the wall-crawler's death (Spider-Man had merely collapsed due to a serious cold in reality). After robbing a helicopter, Drago was pursued by Kraven the Hunter, who resented his claims of victory over Spider-Man, and ended up fighting him until Spider-Man arrived. Spider-Man managed to defeat them both and webbed them up for the police.

Drago was later "rescued" from prison by Toomes – who revealed that learning about Drago's role in his accident had given him the strength to overcome his injuries – but that was merely so Toomes could prove himself to be the true Vulture once again. Once the two were free, Drago was defeated and humiliated by Toomes, who obtained the recognition he desired. A humbled Drago was taken away by the police, vowing that he would not operate as the Vulture again.

=== Clifton Shallot ===
Clifton Shallot as Vulture. Art by Ross Andru.

Dr. Clifton Shallot was an expert on bio-mutation and a professor at Empire State University. He also had one of Toomes' harnesses and costumes, which he had requisitioned from the State Prison Authority. When one of his courses was cancelled by the university trustees, he snapped, and underwent the final stage of the mutation himself when he donned the Vulture costume – his face, teeth, and fingernails mutated, and for a short time, the wings became part of his body and he could fly. The only ones who knew his secret was his lab assistant Dr. Christine Murrow and her roommate Gloria Jenkins.

Mary Jane Watson witnessed him killing Gloria (whom he had mistaken for Christine) and she became a target. While flying around Mary Jane's apartment, he noticed Spider-Man and attacked him. Vulture managed to defeat Spider-Man and leave him for dead. Shallot then searched for a way to reverse the transformation. He stole some chemicals from a ship called the Düsseldorf at Dock 20. The next morning as he was flying to Christine's lab, Vulture noticed Mary Jane in her car. He dove toward the car and grabbed Mary Jane. He was then encountered in the air by Spider-Man, who dropped Mary Jane, giving Vulture enough time to reach the Biology Lab. He attacked Christine, only for Spider-Man to arrive and defend her. Vulture managed to rip the webbing with his sharp finger claws and teeth. Their fight continued, with Spider-Man blinding Vulture with the webbing as the cops arrived and threw a net over them. Still blinded by the webbing, Vulture broke free from the net and grabbed Spider-Man, thinking he was Christine. When he saw it was Spider-Man, Vulture ended up dropping him.

Vulture went back to his lab and transformed back into Shallot. He then had an agreement with Christine, stating that he would not kill her if she did not betray his trust. Later that night, Vulture flew back to Dock 20 and stole more chemicals. He noticed that Peter Parker had followed him and picked him up and dropped him into the water. When he flew above Mary Jane's apartment, Vulture noticed her getting into a taxi. Vulture attacked the taxi and kidnapped Mary Jane, only for Spider-Man to interrupt him, causing Vulture to flee. He made it back to his lab where Christine was. Spider-Man then arrived an hour later, finding Christine there. Vulture then attacked Spider-Man, who subdued him and force-fed Vulture the antidote he had stolen from the Düsseldorf. After reverting from his Vulture form, Shallot fainted. Shallot is presumably still serving his sentence for the murder of Gloria.

=== Jimmy Natale ===
Jimmy Natale as Vulture. Cover to The Amazing Spider-Man #623. Art by Joe Quinones.

A fifth Vulture appears in the story arc "Spider-Man 24/7". He is a human/bird hybrid vigilante rather than a supervillain, mercilessly killing and eating criminals. While fighting, he temporarily blinded Spider-Man with an acid that the creature spit in his face. Spider-Man later defeated this new Vulture in the Yankee Stadium.

During The Gauntlet storyline, Vulture escapes from prison and goes after the mobsters responsible for his transformation. The first mobster he finds reveals Vulture's past as the Maggia's "cleaner" Jimmy Natale, and lies about his transformation being caused by J. Jonah Jameson. In truth, it was Dr. Charles Goss, a biochemist who used machines previously owned by the Stillwell brothers to create a new Vulture. Dr. Goss fibs that Jameson had a hand in his creation, until he confesses to the proper authorities. After Spider-Man fends him off, Vulture visits the mobster again, who comes clean about being behind his mutation. After that, Vulture kills him. He is later seen soaring above the Daily Bugle ruins and flies past by a jobless Peter Parker at night.

In the Origin of the Species story-arc, Vulture joins Doctor Octopus' supervillain team, which was assembled to procure specific items. He attacks Spider-Man, who is caring for Lily Hollister's newborn child in Hamilton Heights, but their fight is interrupted by the Freak. The two villains team up after a brief scrimmage and are knocked out by Spider-Man.

A further-mutated Vulture is hired by the Exchange to assassinate the Punisher. Vulture ambushes the vigilante at an abandoned warehouse, and the two engage in an aerial battle, which ends with the Punisher fatally stabbing Vulture in the torso and jaw, causing him to crash land in the South Bronx. The Punisher flees the scene, leaving Vulture's body to be recovered by the NYPD and examined by Carlie Cooper.

== Powers, abilities, and equipment ==
By utilizing their Vulture harnesses, each Vulture is able to fly as if with a natural winged flight. He wears a costume of synthetic stretch fabric housing an electromagnetic harness with artificial bird-like wings attached beneath the arms. This consists of an anti-graviton generator worn on his body as a harness, enabling him to hover silently with precise maneuverability.

Adrian Toomes

The Vulture harness increases Toomes' resistance to injury to the point that he can survive blows from Spider-Man's super strength. Another by-product of his exposure to its unique radiation is that, despite old age and no exercise, his physical strength represents the upper limits in human development. When he removes it, most of these abilities slowly fade, although the rate at which this transpires remains unclear (some writers have suggested that his strength is permanent). Toomes is also elderly and depends on the tailored suit for strength, speed, and health boosting, as well as draining life force to maintain his own youth. It has recently been revealed that, due to the prolonged use of his harness, he could levitate or float even without it, but he still needs the wings for mobility while airborne. He once upgraded to a new version of his flying apparatus, complete with battle armor, metallic wings, and sharpened feathers. During the later years, he added various weapons to his arsenal. Vulture possesses brilliant expertise in the fields of electronics and chemistry, with a great talent for invention.

Blackie Drago

While wearing the Vulture costume, Drago has super strength, durability, and speed, as well as flight. He added a built-in radio helmet with limited receiver functions as extra protection for his head.

Clifton Shallot

As a physical duplicate of Vulture, Shallot has enhanced strength, resilience, and mobility, along with natural fangs and talons. He is capable of flight, due to the wings grafted onto his body.

Jimmy Natale

The Red Vulture possesses inhuman strength and durability, as well as flight, natural talons, and acid expulsion. His costume is identical to Toomes, complete with bladed feathers.

== Reception ==
- In 2020, CBR.com ranked Vulture 3rd in their "10 Most Powerful Members of the Sinister Syndicate" list.

== Alternative versions ==
Many alternate versions of Vulture have appeared throughout the character's publication history.

=== Amazing Spider-Man: Renew Your Vows ===
In The Amazing Spider-Man: Renew Your Vows, Vulture appears as a member of Regent's Sinister Six. The "Spider-Geddon" storyline introduces a group called the Vulture Gang, which is inspired by this version of Vulture.

=== Earth-138 ===
On Earth-138, Adrian Toomes is the CEO of Bestman/Toomes. Using Toomestone Records, Toomes buys out Free Medianet in an attempt to shut down Spider-Punk as he is attending a concert sponsored by Free Medianet. This interruption led to a fight between Toomes' security force and Spider-Punk's Spider-Army until it was broken up by the arrival of Ducktor Doom 2099's forces.

=== Earth X ===
In the Earth X reality, Adrian Toomes mutated into a vulture-like form after being exposed to Terrigen Mist. He serves as a member of the Enforcers, bodyguards of President Norman Osborn.

=== Marvel 2099 ===
Spider-Man 2099 and Vulture 2099 on the cover of Spider-Man 2099 #7. Art by Rick Leonardi.

In the Marvel 2099 universe, the Vulture is an insane cannibal who seeks to rule the sky and uses advanced combat armor enabling him to fly. In his debut, Vulture saves Spider-Man from a group of thugs and proposes an alliance against the Public Eye police force, but Spider-Man rejects his offer of partnership when he realizes the Vulture is a cannibal.

=== Marvel Noir ===
The Marvel Noir version of Adrian Toomes / Vulture is a former circus freak who was taken by mob boss Norman Osborn to become one of his hitmen. He was responsible for the death of Ben Parker, whom the Vulture cannibalized after Peter Parker was beaten by Osborn's Enforcers. Vulture later takes May Parker hostage and attempts to kill her, but Spider-Man saves her and kills the Vulture.

=== Spider-Gwen ===
The Vulture appears in the first arc of the Spider-Gwen solo series taking place on Earth-65. He is an enemy of Gwen Stacy / Spider-Woman and appears more deranged than his Earth-616 incarnation, secreting a green gaseous cloud wherever he goes.

=== Spider-Verse ===
In Spider-Verse, alternate versions of Blackie Drago, Jimmy Natale, Adrian Toomes, and Clifton Shallot appear as members of the Hounds.

=== Ultimate Marvel ===
In the Ultimate Marvel universe, Adrian Toomes is an employee of Trask Industries and does not become the Vulture. This universe's Vulture is instead Blackie Drago, who is a former S.H.I.E.L.D. agent. The Ultimate Marvel version of Vulture was rendered by artist Mark Bagley to resemble actor Jason Statham as per writer Brian Michael Bendis' instructions.

== In other media ==
=== Television ===
Adrian Toomes / Vulture as he appears in Spider-Man: The Animated Series.

Vulture as he appears in Spider-Man Unlimited.

Adrian Toomes / Vulture as he appears in The Spectacular Spider-Man.

- The Blackie Drago incarnation of Vulture, referred to as Vulture Man, appears in Spider-Man (1967), voiced by Gillie Fenwick.
- The Adrian Toomes incarnation of Vulture appears in Spider-Man (1981), voiced by Don Messick.
- The Adrian Toomes incarnation of Vulture appears in Spider-Man: The Animated Series, voiced by Eddie Albert as an old man and by Alan Johnson as a young man. This version is an engineer who seeks revenge on Norman Osborn and drains youth from others in a bid to become younger. He later becomes a member of the Kingpin's Insidious Six.
- A heroic half-Bestial incarnation of Vulture from Counter-Earth appears in Spider-Man Unlimited (1999), voiced by Scott McNeil.
- The Adrian Toomes incarnation of Vulture appears in The Spectacular Spider-Man, voiced by Robert Englund. This version is a former aeronautics engineer who wears a modified version of Terry Dodson's black and red suit from Marvel Knights Spider-Man and initially seeks revenge against Norman Osborn for stealing his inventions before joining the Sinister Six as Doctor Octopus's right-hand man.
- The Adrian Toomes incarnation of Vulture appears in Ultimate Spider-Man (2012), voiced by Tom Kenny. This version is a teenage test subject of Doctor Octopus's genetic experiments with the ability to transform into an anthropomorphic vulture-esque form that sports Jimmy Natale's organic wings and sonic shriek. Following a brief stint with the Thunderbolts, Toomes is later equipped with Blackie Drago's green Ultimate Marvel armor after becoming involved with Hydra, and his mainstream version's red and black armor after joining the Sinister Six. Additionally, he is not as villainous as other versions and even regards Spider-Man as a friend, only siding with supervillains who offered to help him discover his origins before eventually redeeming himself.
- The Adrian Toomes incarnation of Vulture appears in Spider-Man (2017), voiced by Alastair Duncan. This version is a middle-aged man whose flight suit is equipped with a neck-mounted device that enables sonic attacks and was originally an employee of Max Modell before being fired for stealing equipment. Vulture initially appears as a member of the Sinister Six before becoming the leader of the Goblin Nation.
- The Adrian Toomes incarnation of Vulture appears in the Avengers Assemble episode "The Vibranium Curtain", voiced again by Alastair Duncan.

=== Film ===
- Adrian Toomes appears in the Marvel Cinematic Universe (MCU) film Spider-Man: Homecoming (2017), portrayed by Michael Keaton. This version previously ran a New York salvaging company and is Liz Allan's father. Additionally, his flight suit is equipped with turbine-powered wings, claw-like wingtips, and boot-mounted talons. Years prior, his company is run out of business following the Battle of New York and the creation of the Department of Damage Control. In response, he persuades his colleagues Phineas Mason, Herman Schultz, Jackson Brice, and Randy Vale not to relinquish the salvaged Chitauri technology they collected and instead repurpose it for a black market weapons ring. In the present, after deducing Spider-Man's secret identity when Spider-Man interferes with his operation, Toomes threatens retaliation unless Spider-Man stops, sparing his life since the latter previously saved Liz's life. However, Spider-Man thwarts Toomes amidst his attempt to hijack a plane carrying much of the Avengers' weaponry, saves Toomes' life when his suit malfunctions, and leaves him for Happy Hogan and the FBI. As a result, Toomes' family moves away. In a mid-credits scene, an imprisoned Toomes is approached by Mac Gargan, who wants to confirm whether the former knows Spider-Man's identity, which Toomes denies.
  - Adrian Toomes appears in the post-credits scenes of the Sony's Spider-Man Universe (SSU) film Morbius (2022), portrayed again by Michael Keaton. Following the events of Spider-Man: No Way Home (2021), Toomes is transported to the SSU, where he is released from prison, develops a new flight suit, and approaches Michael Morbius, suggesting they form a team.
- An Italian Renaissance-themed alternate universe version of Vulture based on Isidoro Scarlotti and Adrian Toomes named Adriano Tumino appears in Spider-Man: Across the Spider-Verse (2023), voiced by Jorma Taccone.

=== Video games ===
- The Adrian Toomes incarnation of Vulture appears in the Sega CD version of Spider-Man vs. The Kingpin.
- The Adrian Toomes incarnation of Vulture appears in Spider-Man: Return of the Sinister Six as a member of the eponymous group.
- The Adrian Toomes incarnation of Vulture appears in Spider-Man (1995).
- The Adrian Toomes incarnation of Vulture appears in Spider-Man vs. the Sinister Six, voiced by Darren Eliker.
- The Adrian Toomes incarnation of Vulture appears in Spider-Man 2: The Sinister Six as a member of the eponymous group.
- The Adrian Toomes incarnation of Vulture appears in Spider-Man (2002), voiced by Dwight Schultz.
- The Adrian Toomes incarnation of Vulture appears as a boss in the Nintendo DS and PSP versions of Spider-Man 2 (2004), voiced again by Dwight Schultz.
- The Ultimate Marvel incarnation of Adrian Toomes appears in the PlayStation 2, GameCube, and Xbox versions of Ultimate Spider-Man (2005), voiced by Brian George. This version works for Bolivar Trask.
- The Adrian Toomes incarnation of Vulture appears as an assist character and boss in Spider-Man: Web of Shadows, voiced by Kristoffer Tabori. This version's wings are made out of steel swords controlled by electromagnets that can also be used as projectiles. He initially works for the Kingpin until he is infected by a symbiote and attempts to take control of an invading symbiote army.
- The Marvel Noir incarnation of Adrian Toomes / Vulture appears as a boss in Spider-Man: Shattered Dimensions, voiced by Steve Blum. He obtains a fragment of the Tablet of Order and Chaos that grants him teleportation powers and is pursued by Spider-Man Noir, who seeks both the fragment and revenge for his Uncle Ben's murder.
  - In the Nintendo DS version, the Marvel 2099 incarnation of Vulture appears as an enemy of Spider-Man 2099.
- The Adrian Toomes incarnation of Vulture appears as a boss in Marvel: Avengers Alliance. This version is a member of the Sinister Six.
- The Adrian Toomes incarnation of Vulture appears as a playable character in Lego Marvel Super Heroes, voiced by Nolan North.
- Various alternate reality versions of Adrian Toomes / Vulture appear as bosses in Spider-Man Unlimited (2014), voiced by Christopher Daniel Barnes. These versions are members of a multiversal Sinister Six.
- The Adrian Toomes incarnation of Vulture appears in Marvel Contest of Champions as a member of the Sinister Six.
- The Adrian Toomes incarnation of Vulture appears as a playable character in Marvel: Future Fight.
- The Adrian Toomes incarnation of Vulture appears as a playable character in Marvel Puzzle Quest as a member of the Sinister Six.
- The Adrian Toomes incarnation of Vulture appears as a playable character and boss in Lego Marvel Super Heroes 2. This version is a member of the Sinister Six. Additionally, the MCU incarnation of Adrian Toomes / Vulture is also playable.
- The Adrian Toomes incarnation of Vulture appears in Marvel Strike Force as a member of the Sinister Six.
- The Adrian Toomes incarnation of Vulture appears as a boss in Spider-Man (2018), voiced again by Dwight Schultz. This version is a longtime foe of Spider-Man's who suffers from spinal cancer as a result of prolonged exposure to his flight suit's power source. After being broken out of the Raft, he joins Doctor Octopus's Sinister Six in the hopes of receiving a cure and partners with Electro to kill Spider-Man, only to be defeated and recaptured.
