= Carl von Liebermeister =

German internist

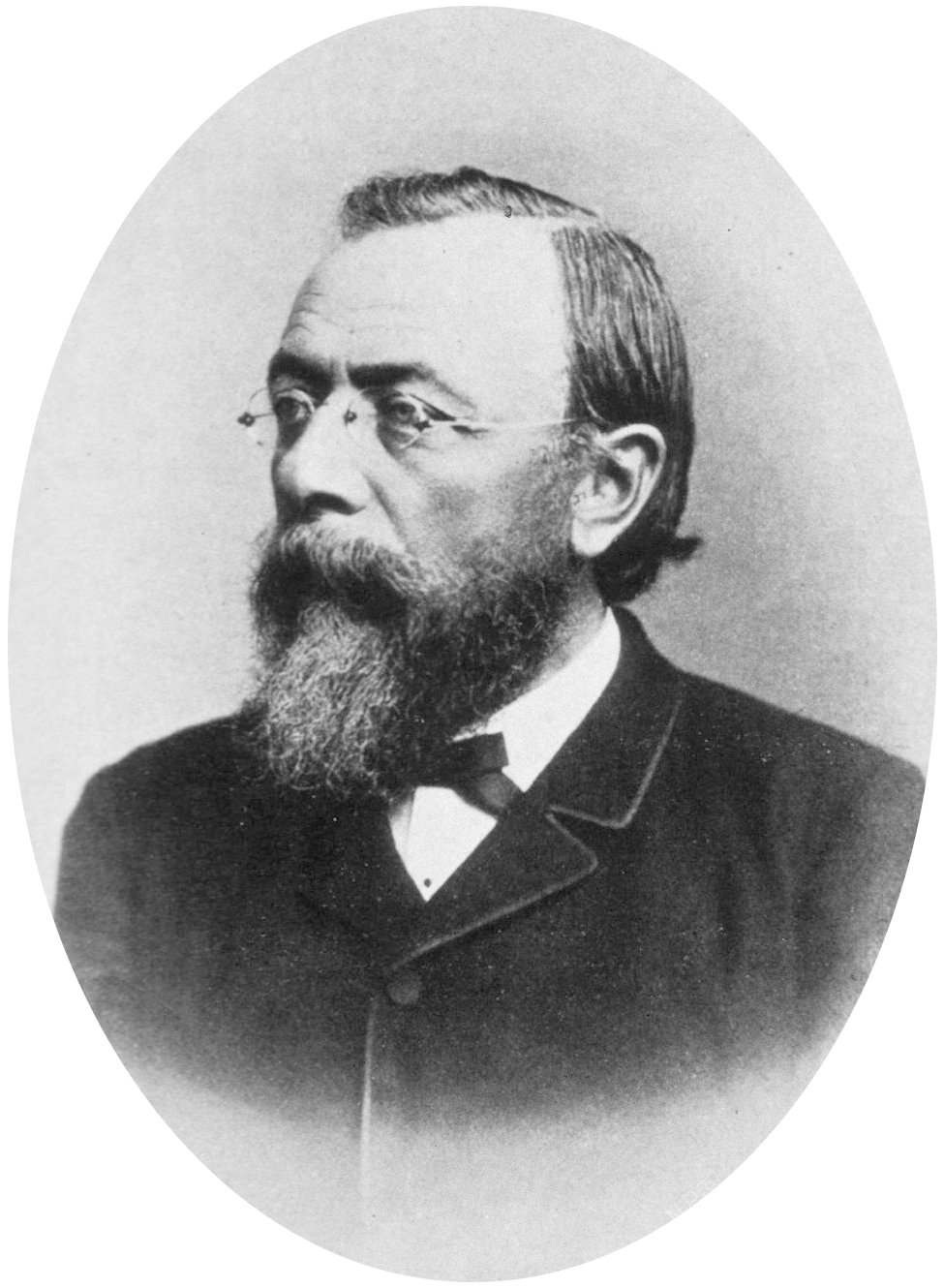
Karl von Liebermeister

Carl von Liebermeister (2 February 1833 – 24 December 1901) was a German internist who was a native of Ronsdorf.

In 1856 he received his medical degree from Greifswald, and in 1860 became an assistant to Felix von Niemeyer (1820-1871) at the University of Tübingen. In 1864 he became a professor of pathology in Basel, and in 1871 returned to Tübingen as a successor to Dr. Niemeyer.

Liebermeister is remembered for his work involving the pathophysiology of fever, and research of anti-pyretic treatments such as hydrotherapy. His name is associated with a dictum dealing with the relationship between the frequency of an individual's pulse and the body's temperature when feverish. "Liebermeister's rule" states that in adult febrile tachycardia, pulse-beats increase at a rate of approximately eight beats per minute to each degree Celsius.

Liebermeister was interested in many facets of medicine, publishing articles on a wide array of subjects. Among his better known writings was Handbuch der Pathologie und Therapie des Fiebers (Textbook of Pathology and Therapy of Fevers, 1875). Also, he was the author of a comprehensive work on cholera called Cholera Asiatica und Cholera Nostras, a treatise that was included in Hermann Nothnagel's Specielle Pathologie und Therapie.

== Associated eponym ==
- "Liebermeister's grooves": Developmental grooves on the surface of the liver.
