= Robert Rodi =

American novelist

- Born: 1956 (age 69–70) Chicago, Illinois, U.S.
- Areas: Writer, critic, playwright, performance artist
- Notable works: Codename: Knockout; Kept Boy

Robert Rodi (born 1956 in Chicago, Illinois) is an American novelist, playwright, comic book writer, essayist, and performance artist.

== Biography ==
Much of his fiction centers on gay themes and several of his novels are named after archetypes of gay male culture. Rodi himself is openly gay. The Chicago settings of his books also reflect his background.

Rodi's short fiction is collected in a number of anthologies, including Men on Men 5 and Neil Gaiman's The Sandman: Book of Dreams. His comic book work has appeared in Marvel Comics, the DC Comics imprint Vertigo, and other independent publishers. He was also well known in comic book circles during the '60s and '70s as a prolific writer of "letters to the editor" (as Bob Rodi).

Rodi was a founding member of the Chicago-area performance group The Pansy Kings and contributed plays and performed at the Live Bait Theatre.

The film adaptation of his novel Kept Boy was released in 2017.

He is currently the head writer on MeTV's Toon In With Me.

== Bibliography ==
=== Novels ===
- Fag Hag (1991)
- What They Did to Princess Paragon (1994)
- Closet Case (1994)
- Drag Queen (1995)
- Kept Boy (1996)
- The Birdcage — novelization of the film (1996)
- Bitch Goddess (2002)
- When You Were Me (2007)
- The Sugarman Bootlegs (2011)
- Baby (2012)
- Edgar and Emma : A Novel after Jane Austen (2016)

=== Nonfiction ===
- Dogged Pursuit: My Year of Competing Dusty, the World's Least Likely Agility Dog (2009)
- Seven Seasons in Siena: My Quixotic Quest for Acceptance Among Tuscany's Proudest People (2011)
- Bitch In a Bonnet: Reclaiming Jane Austen from the Stiffs, the Snobs, the Simps and the Saps (Volumes 1&2) (2012)

=== Comics ===
- "Genes and a T-Shirt," in Heartthrobs #1 (with Phil Jimenez, Vertigo, January 1999)
- "Immune," in Strange Adventures #1 (with Frank Quitely, Vertigo, November 1999)
- Four Horsemen (with Esad Ribic, 4-issue limited series, Vertigo, 2000)
- "You've Got Hate Mail" (with Marcelo Frusin, in Flinch #8, Vertigo, January 2000)
- "The Spoils of War" (with Frank Teran, in Weird War Tales Special #1, Vertigo, April 2000)
- Codename: Knockout #1–24 (with Louis Small, Jr., Vertigo, 2001–2003, tpb, May 2010, ISBN 1-4012-2798-8)
- Elektra #23-35 (Marvel Comics, 2003–04)
- The Crossovers #1–9 (with Mauricet, CGE/Code6, February–December 2003)
- Identity Disc (with John Higgins, 5-issue limited series, Marvel Comics, August–December 2004, tpb, ISBN 0-7851-1567-6)
- Rogue #1–6 (with Cliff Richards, Marvel Comics, 2004, tpb, March 2005, ISBN 0-7851-1336-3)
- Loki (with Esad Ribic, 4-issue limited series, Marvel Comics, 2004, hardcover, February 2005, ISBN 0-7851-1652-4, softcover, October 2007, ISBN 0-7851-2891-3)
- Astonishing Thor (with Mike Choi, 5-issue mini-series, Marvel Comics, 2011)
- Thor: For Asgard (with Simone Bianchi, 6-issue mini-series, Marvel Comics, 2011)
- Thor: The Deviants Saga (with Stephen Segovia, 5 issues, Marvel Comics, 2012)
- Merry Men (with Jackie Lewis (artist), Marissa Louise (colorist), Shari Chankhamma (colorist), and Jon Cairns (letterer), 5-issue mini-series, Oni Press, 2018)
