= Liebermeister's rule =

Liebermeister's rule concerns the increment ratio between an adult individual's cardiac frequency and temperature when in fever. Each Celsius grade of body temperature increment corresponds to an 8 beats per minute increase in cardiac frequency, although the exact number of this rule varies significantly across different sources. An exception to this rule by creating a relative bradycardia is known as Faget sign (pulse-temperature dissociation) common in some diseases, especially yellow fever, tularaemia and salmonella typhi. It is named for Carl von Liebermeister.
