= Queer Creek =

Queer Creek may refer to:

- Queer Creek (Alaska), a stream in Matanuska-Susitna Borough
- Queer Creek (Montana), a tributary to the Vermilion River
- Queer Creek (Ohio), a stream in Hocking County
