= Identity Disc =

American comic book series

- Cover of Identity Disc #1

Publication information
- Publisher: Marvel Comics
- Schedule: Monthly
- Format: Limited series
- Genre: Superhero
- Publication date: August - December 2004
- No. of issues: 5
- Main character(s): Deadpool; Bullseye; Juggernaut; Sandman; Vulture; Sabretooth

Creative team
- Written by: Robert Rodi
- Penciller: John Higgins
- Inker: Sandu Florea
- Letterer: David Sharpe
- Colorist: Estudio Fenix
- Editor: Warren Simons

Collected editions
- Identity Disc: ISBN 0-7851-1567-6

Identity Disc is a 2004 five-part comic book limited series published by Marvel Comics. The story was written by Robert Rodi and penciled by John Higgins.

In the story, six Marvel villains "team up" to steal the Identity Disc, which supposedly contains data on every Marvel hero, including their relatives and credit reports.

== Plot ==
The story opens with a younger Adrian Toomes, pre-Vulture, being captured by police as his wife takes his daughter from him. Years later, Deadpool, Bullseye, Juggernaut, Sandman, Vulture, and Sabretooth are recruited by an agent working for underworld figure Tristram Silver, who knows each of their dark secrets. The agent demonstrates that she can take any one of them down by killing Sandman. She wants them to hunt down the Identity Disc, which contains every piece of information on Marvel's Earthbound superheroes.

The remaining villains break into A.I.M headquarters to steal the disc. Deadpool separates from the rest of the group to draw off the assaulting A.I.M. agents. Sabretooth descends down an elevator shaft, only to be accidentally crushed by a plummeting Juggernaut. The Juggernaut locates the identity disc, but is gassed by an unseen assailant and rendered unconscious. The A.I.M. lair collapses and the Vulture is taken into custody by S.H.I.E.L.D.

Nick Fury informs Toomes that Sabretooth was responsible for the set-up. It is revealed that Silver's agent is Valeria Toomes, an agent of S.H.I.E.L.D. and Vulture's daughter. Toomes scoffs at the notion that he would not recognize his own daughter and privately concedes to orchestrating the plan to protect her identity. Valeria then leads Toomes to be taken away in a S.H.I.E.L.D. chopper.

Meanwhile, Sandman is revealed to be alive and enjoying a tropical vacation, having faked his death at the behest of his employer, the real Tristram Silver.

== Collected editions ==
Identity Disc was published collectively as a 120-page trade paperback, ISBN 0-7851-1567-6.
