= Queer Creek (Ohio) =

Stream in Hocking County, Ohio, U.S.

Coordinates: 39°24′26″N 82°38′04″W

Queer Creek is a stream in Hocking County, Ohio, flowing through the heart of Hocking Hills State Park and parts of the surrounding Hocking State Forest. It is a tributary of Salt Creek and forms part of the larger Scioto River drainage system.

== Course and features ==
The creek follows a winding path through a narrow gorge cut into Blackhand sandstone, shaping some of the region’s most dramatic terrain. Along its route, it passes through forested cliffs and ledges, feeding into waterfalls including Cedar Falls, one of the most prominent falls in Hocking Hills State Park. Portions of the Gorge Trail follow the creek closely, offering hikers access to scenic rock formations and shaded ravines.

== Name ==
The name "Queer Creek" is believed to date to the early 1800s, when settlers noted the stream’s unusual route through the hills. The term "queer" referred at the time to something strange or unexpected, and the creek’s sharp bends and shifting course stood out from neighboring waterways.

== Ecology and watershed ==
Queer Creek lies within a relatively intact forest ecosystem and supports a range of native plant and animal life. Eastern hemlock and hardwoods line the gorge, while mosses and ferns thrive along shaded rock walls. A 2009 report by the Ohio Environmental Protection Agency listed segments of the creek's upper tributaries as having “non-impaired” water quality, a reflection of the area’s limited development and forest cover.

== History ==
Prior to European settlement, the Queer Creek valley and surrounding hills were used by Indigenous communities for travel and hunting. Later, early pioneers established mills and small settlements along the stream’s banks, particularly near present-day South Bloomingville. Local accounts claim that the last wild bison in Ohio was shot near the creek in 1799.

== Recreation ==
The creek remains a focal point for hikers, nature photographers, and visitors to Hocking Hills State Park. The Gorge Trail between Old Man’s Cave and Cedar Falls follows the stream closely and is one of the park’s most frequently used routes. The falls are especially popular in spring and fall, when water levels and foliage make for ideal viewing conditions.

== Conservation ==
Ongoing conservation work in the Queer Creek watershed has focused on preserving tributary streams, mature forest, and wildlife corridors. The Appalachia Ohio Alliance has worked to secure long-term protections for more than 2,900 feet of tributary stream corridors, as part of broader land stewardship efforts in the Hocking Hills area.

== See also ==
- Hocking Hills State Park
- Hocking State Forest
