= Tobacco Products Control Act, 1993 =

The Tobacco Products Control Act was introduced in South Africa in 1993, where smoking has been rated the second highest health concern, after HIV/AIDS.

This act has been amended several times during the past decade and today South Africa has some of the strictest tobacco control measures ever adopted by the government of a developing country. It is estimated that cigarette consumption has fallen dramatically since the early 1990s while the percentage of adult smokers in the country has dropped from 32 to 26.5 percent.

== The Tobacco Products Control Act of 1993 ==
The South African Government passed the first Tobacco Products Control Act in 1993 and started implementing the act in 1995. The act regulated smoking in public areas and prohibited tobacco sales to people under the age of 16. Some aspects of tobacco advertising were also regulated for example labelling.

== The Tobacco Products Control Amendment Act - 1999 ==
The 1993 act was not considered to be comprehensive enough and the Tobacco Products Control Amendment Act was passed in 1999. This act bans all advertising and promotion of tobacco products, including sponsorship and free distribution of tobacco products. The act also restricts smoking in public places which includes the workplace, restaurants and bars and public transport. The act also stipulates penalties for transgressors of the law, and specifies the maximum permissible levels of tar and nicotine. The regulations were implemented in 2001.

== The Tobacco Products Control Amendment Act - 2007 ==
The government proposed further amendments to the bill in 2007 which will seek to deal with new practices designed to circumvent the provisions of the Act. These amendments will also aim to bring the current law into compliance with the World Health Organization Framework Convention on Tobacco Control (FCTC). This framework has been ratified by the South African government.

The former minister Madlala-Routledge was quoted:

The Bill further proposes a number of amendments to the Act, which are designed to promote health and prevent diseases. The main provisions of the Bill are to:

- amend the current Act so as to strengthen the sections which prohibit advertising, promotion and sponsorship
- remove misleading package descriptors like "light" and "mild"
- control the ingredients in and emissions from tobacco products
- increase penalties for breaking the law.

== The Tobacco Products Control Amendment Act, 2008 ==
The act was amended by Act 36 of 2008 with these changes:

- Changes the definitions of advertising
- specifically includes regulation of importers
- Specifically bans promotions and product placement
- Raises the minimum age to buy / obtain cigarettes to 18 years
- Prohibits the sale of candy cigarettes
- Prohibits the sale of cigarettes at educational premises for people under 18 or on health-related premises
- Prohibits online or postal sales of tobacco products
- Prohibits giving away cigarettes or offer rewards or prizes for their purchase
- Additional regulation of cigarette vending machines

== See also ==
- List of tobacco products
- Smoking ban
- Tobacco advertising#Africa
- Tobacco control
