= Queer Island =

Island in Kodiak Island Borough, Alaska

- Interactive map of Queer Island

Geography
- Location: Kodiak Island Borough
- Coordinates: 57.6766667°N 152.38°W

Administration
- United States
- State: Alaska
- Borough: Kodiak Island Borough

Queer Island is an island in Kodiak Island Borough, Alaska, in the United States.

The name is derived from a translation of the Russian name of the island: "Ostrov Chudnoy" (Остров Чудной).
