= Fagg, Virginia =

Unincorporated community in Virginia, US

Fagg
- Unincorporated Community
- Location within the state of Virginia Fagg (the United States)
- Coordinates: 37°11′46″N 80°19′23″W
- Country: United States
- State: Virginia
- County: Montgomery
- Elevation: 1,401 ft (427 m)
- Time zone: UTC−5 (Eastern (EST))
  - Summer (DST): UTC−4 (EDT)
- GNIS feature ID: 1477314

Fagg is an unincorporated community in Montgomery County, Virginia, United States.

== History ==
A post office was established at Fagg in 1886, and remained in operation until it was discontinued in 1910. The community's namesake was George Washington Fagg, a county sheriff.
