= Fag Hag (novel) =

1992 book by Robert Rodi

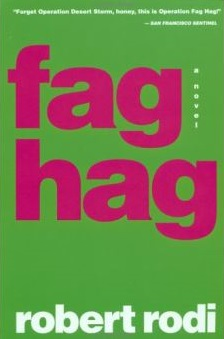
- Fag Hag, a novel by Robert Rodi
- Author: Robert Rodi
- Language: English
- Publisher: Dutton Penguin
- Publication date: 1992
- Publication place: United States
- Media type: Print (hardcover)
- Pages: 296 pages (1st edition)
- ISBN: 0-14-029534-8 (hardcover edition)

Fag Hag is a novel by gay writer Robert Rodi published in 1992 by Dutton, New York. The title is a gay slang term referring to a woman who either associates mostly or exclusively with gay and bisexual men, or has gay and bisexual men as close friends.

== Plot ==
Set in Chicago, Illinois, this story concerns a female character called Natalie Stathis who is obsessed with her gay best friend Peter Leland. To Natalie, Peter is charming, witty, handsome and everything she seeks in a man and so much more interesting than the heterosexual men she encounters; sadly, Peter remains unobtainable. Natalie seeks to destroy each potential relationship that Peter tries to nurture in the hope that he will remain single and thus, dependent upon her. Natalie goes to considerable lengths to retain her close bond with Peter and is largely successful until he meets the love of his life. Early attempts to split the two men up are ultimately unsuccessful, so Natalie resorts to kidnap.
