= Bubble pipe =

Toy used for blowing soap bubbles

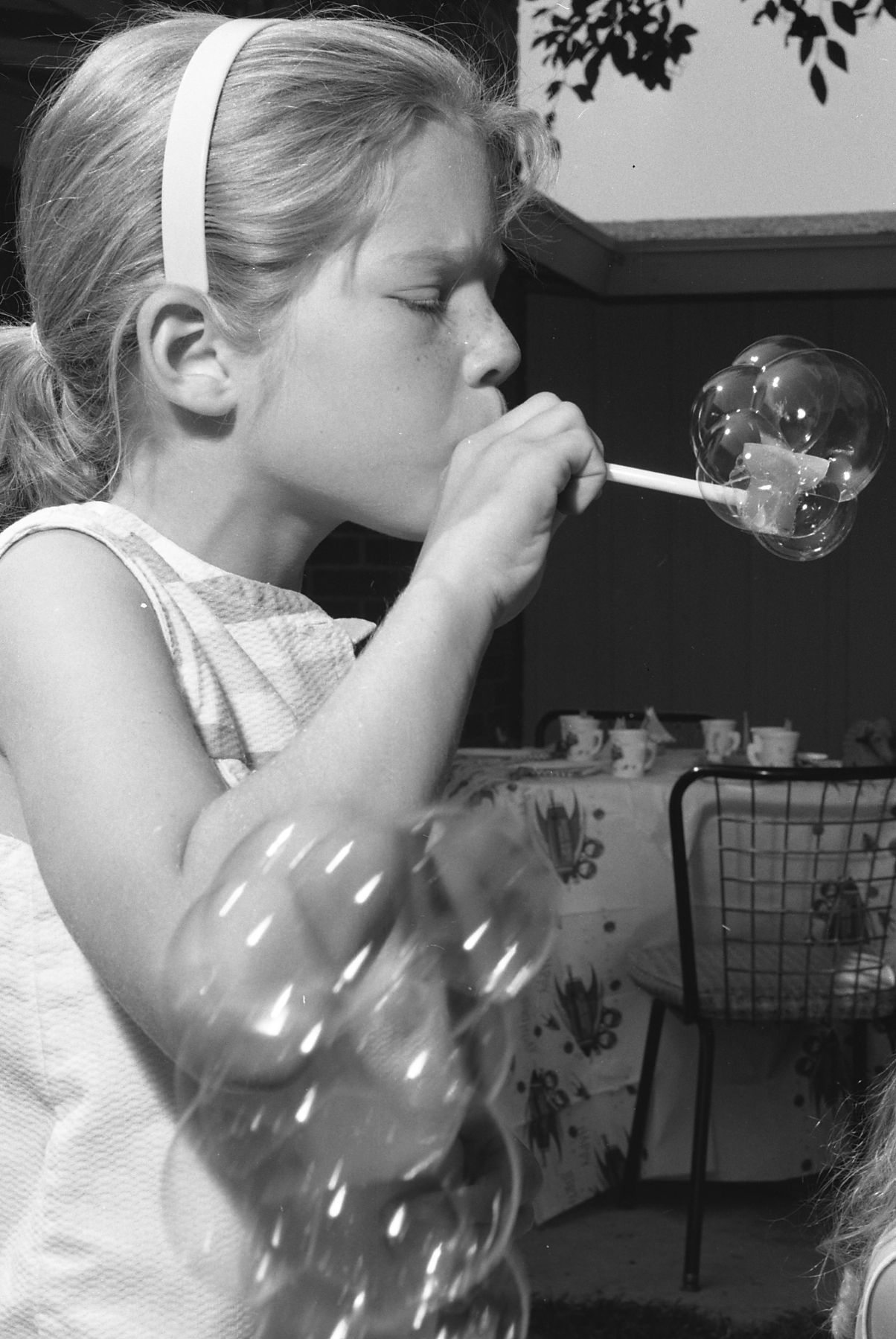
Child blowing a bubble pipe, 1962

A bubble pipe is a toy shaped like a tobacco pipe, intended to be used for blowing soap bubbles.

== Design ==
Bubble pipes are one of the original bubble toys. Most bubble pipes are made of plastic and therefore cannot be used for actual smoking. They are usually brightly colored, and sometimes feature fanciful designs, including multiple bowls (see picture).

Children sometimes use bubble pipes in order to imitate the perceived look of adults.

== History ==
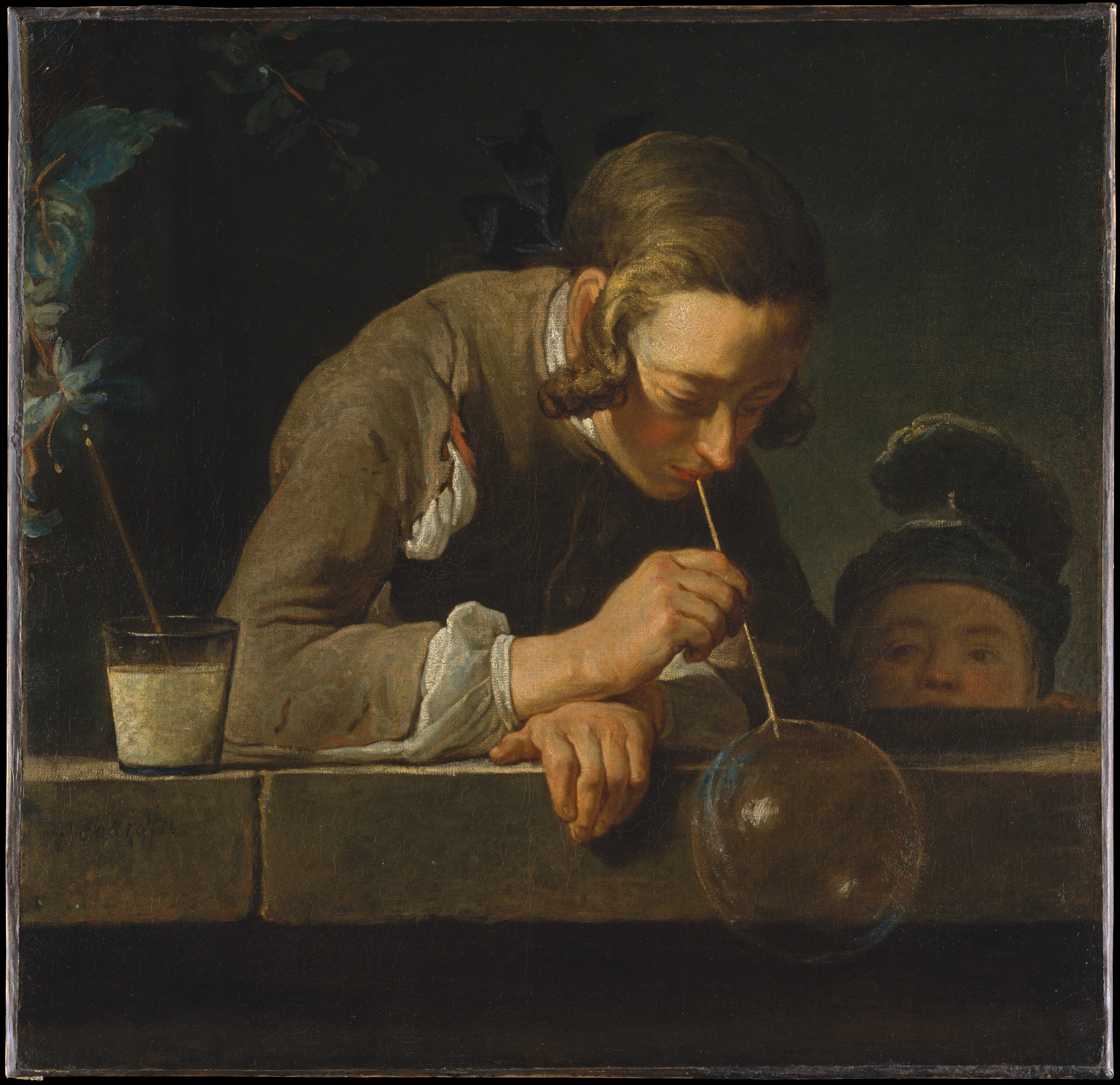
Soap Bubbles by Jean-Baptiste-Siméon Chardin

An 18th-century painting by Jean-Baptiste-Siméon Chardin shows a young boy blowing a bubble out of what seems to be a pipe.

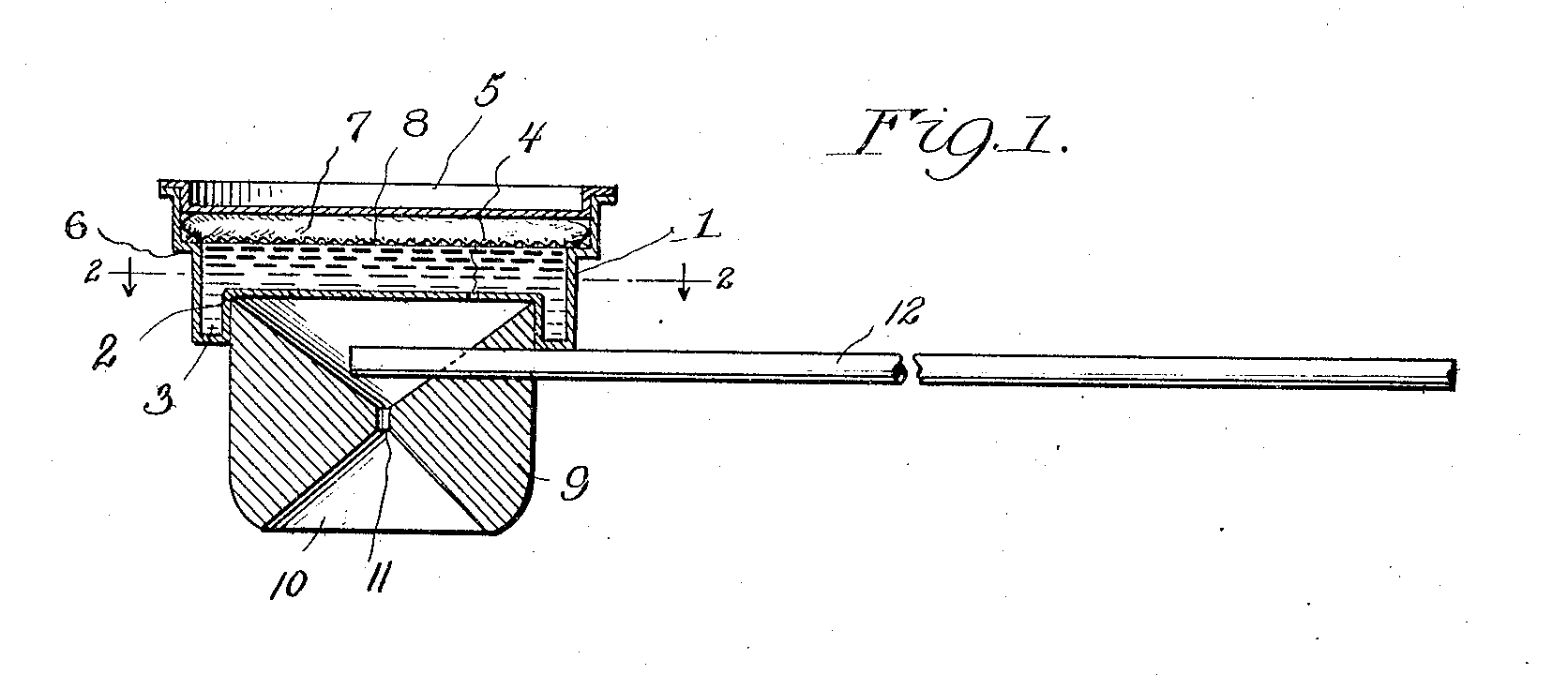
Patent drawing

In 1918, John L. Gilchrist filed a patent for a style of bubble pipes that can be produced quickly and easily. Bubble pipes were one of the first and original mass productions of bubble blowers that became popular so that kids could imitate an adult smoker. In the 1940s, the packaging of the bubble pipes were known to be colorful and decorated in a bright style.

== See also ==
- Bubble wand
- Candy cigarette
- Hippy Sippy
