= Fagot (surname) =

Fagot is a surname of French origin. Notable people with this surname include:

- Diego Fagot (born 1997), American football player
- Emilio Fagot (1883–1946), Puerto Rican politician
- Jean-Noël Fagot (born 1958), French ice speed skater
- Paul Fagot (1842–1908), French malacologist
