= Faget sign =

- Differential diagnosis: Yellow fever, Typhoid fever, Brain abscess, Tularaemia, Brucellosis, COVID 19 Omicron

In medicine, the Faget sign—sometimes called sphygmothermic dissociation—is the unusual pairing of fever with bradycardia (slow pulse). (Fever is usually accompanied by tachycardia (rapid pulse), an association known by the eponym "Liebermeister's rule".) The Faget sign is named after Louisiana physician Jean Charles Faget, who studied yellow fever in Louisiana.

Faget sign is often seen in:

- Yellow fever
- Typhoid fever
- Brain abscess
- Tularaemia
- Brucellosis
- Colorado tick fever
- Some pneumonias - Legionella pneumonia and Mycoplasma pneumonia
- Drug fever (e.g. beta-blockers, known as the Beta-Faget sign)

Of note, the Faget sign in bacterial infections is consistently associated with bacteria that have an intracellular life cycle.
