= Jean Charles Faget =

American physician (1818–1884)

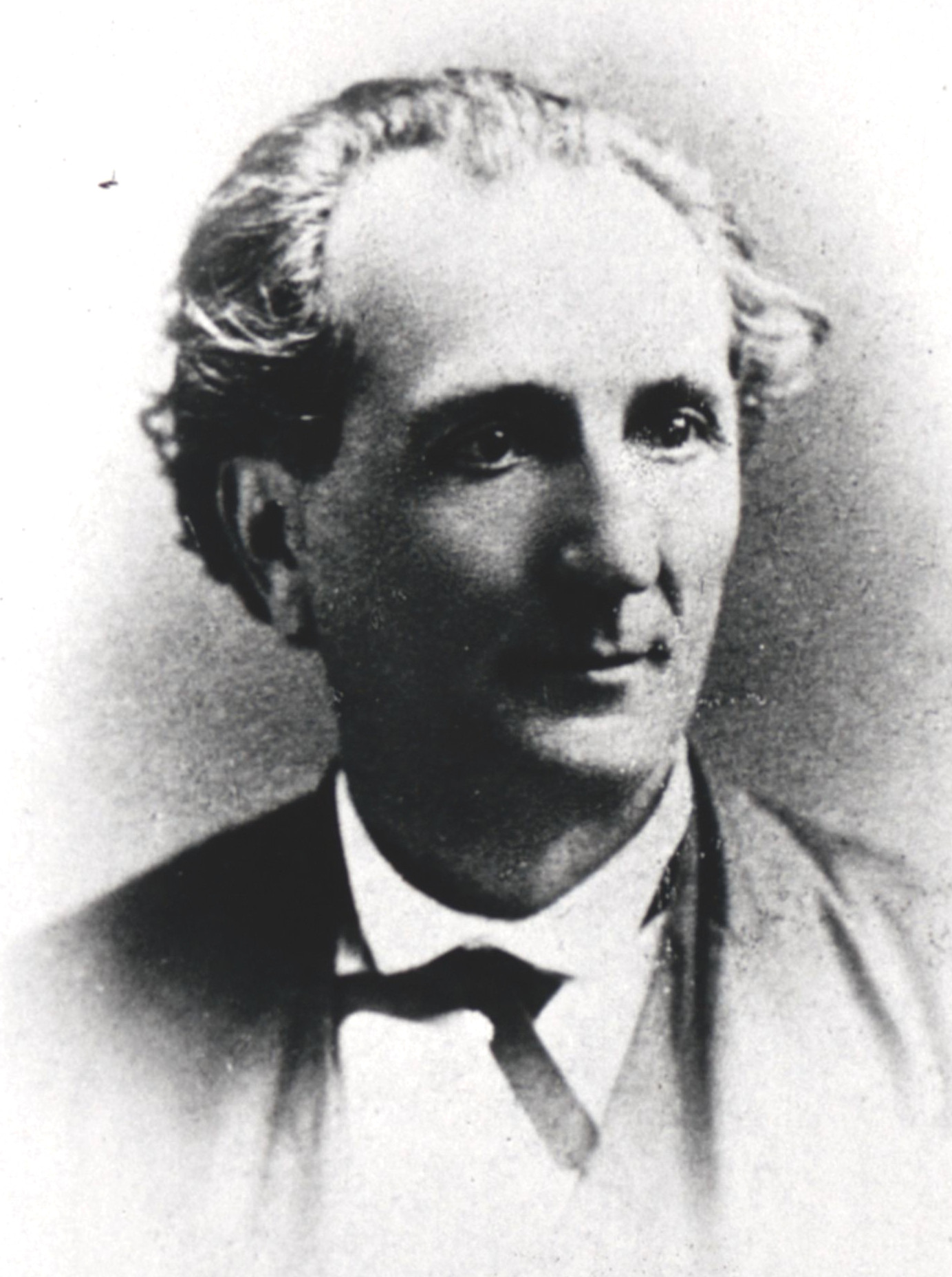
- Born: June 26, 1818; New Orleans
- Died: December 7, 1884 (aged 66); New Orleans
- Occupation: Physician
- Spouse: Glady Ligeret de Chazey
- Children: 13

Jean Charles Faget was a medical doctor born on June 26, 1818, in New Orleans. He is best known for the Faget sign—a medical sign that is the unusual combination of fever and bradycardia. The sign is an important diagnostic symptom of yellow fever.

== Personal life ==
Faget was the grandson of Jean Faget and Marie-Anne Normand. His parents were refugees from Santo Domingo (Saint-Domingue). They fled Hispaniola during the Haitian Revolution and spent some time in Cuba before settling in New Orleans in 1809. Jean Charles was educated by Jesuits in New Orleans before furthering his education at Collège Rolin in Paris from 1830 to 1837. Faget was then admitted into the University of Paris' college of internal medicine and graduated magna cum laude in 1845. He returned to New Orleans and married Glady Ligeret de Chazey and became the father of thirteen children. He was the grandfather of Guy Henry Faget, and great-grandfather of Maxime Faget.

Faget was one of many well-educated French physicians to practice in New Orleans at the time. They had similar backgrounds to Faget either being the children of refugees from Santo Domingo or the upheavals of the French Revolution and ensuing rule by Napoleon I. Faget's education in Paris entered him into an elite circle of physicians known as the Société Médicale de la Nouvelle-Orléans.

== Career ==
His medical practice began during an era when yellow fever was a tremendous problem in New Orleans. The exact cause of yellow fever was not known at the time. Early scientists believed that it was caused by environmental problems like rotting food, weather conditions, and poor sanitation. Faget's observations of the disease prompted him to believe that the disease could be attributed to a specific microorganism. It is now known that yellow fever is a virus that is transmitted by the bite of female mosquitoes (the yellow fever mosquito, Aedes aegypti, and other species) and is found in tropical and subtropical areas in South America and Africa. The origin of the disease is most likely to be Africa, from where it was introduced to South America through the slave trade in the 16th century. During Faget's lifetime, yellow fever was deemed one of the most dangerous infectious diseases.

Faget worked to recognize the correct diagnosis of yellow fever. The earliest accepted signs of the fever were jaundice and vomit containing blood. Faget was convinced that other fevers had the same symptoms. He sought better ways to distinguish yellow fever from other ailments. Other physicians began to notice that their patients with yellow fever shared a common symptom. Early in their illness they experience an increased pulse that was followed by a slow pulse. Faget confirmed these observations and came to the conclusion that the pulse change was unique to those with yellow fever. Faget also became convinced that yellow fever could be traced to a specific microorganism that came to New Orleans via foreign shipping. He noted that those with the fever began feeling the symptoms in areas near the New Orleans dock. He thought that the small organisms were spawned by a combination of rotting matter in ships' holds and the heat and humidity of the city. Faget also noticed a key difference between malaria and yellow fever. Malaria could be treated with quinine, but quinine had no positive effect on yellow fever.

Faget published what became known as Faget's Law. He stated that "the pulse in yellow fever slows as the temperature (of the patient) rises or remains high." Faget's sign is still an important symptom when doctors diagnose yellow fever. His findings were important at the time because they helped other doctors distinguish the differences between malaria and yellow fever. He furthered his studies in the 1860s by using a medical thermometer to gather data on patients with the diseases. He published his findings in French and English journals and stated that yellow fever was distinguished from malaria by the continuous fever that is a symptom as opposed to the fevers and chills of malaria.

Faget also worked in obstetrics and became an early proponent of using anesthesia on pregnant women. He published a paper that was a study of croup and diphtheria. Faget served his community by holding a position on the New Orleans Sanitary Commission and as a member of the Louisiana Board of Health. He went back to Paris for two years after the American Civil War where he was named a chevalier, a Knight of the Legion of Honour by Napoleon III after helping relieve an epidemic in France. Faget died in New Orleans on December 7, 1884.
