= Fred D. Fagg III =

American lawyer

Fred Dow Fagg III

9th Dean of the Lewis and Clark Law School
- In office 1973–1982

Personal details
- Born: February 27, 1934 Evanston, Illinois
- Died: April 19, 2002 (aged 68) Portland, Oregon
- Spouse: Judith Ann Carlisle (m. 1967)
- Children: 1
- Education: University of Southern California, 1956; Harvard Business School, 1960, MBA; University of Michigan Law School, 1963 JD.

Military service
- Branch/service: United States Navy
- Rank: Ensign

Fred Dow Fagg III (February 27, 1934 – April 19, 2002) was the ninth dean of the Northwestern School of Law at Lewis & Clark, now Lewis and Clark Law School, in Portland, Oregon.

== Personal life ==
Fagg, the son of former President of the University of Southern California Fred D. Fagg, Jr., joined the law school in 1970 and served as dean from 1973 to 1982. While he was Dean, the law school gained full accreditation by the American Bar Association and the Association of American Law Schools. As a professor of law, Fagg taught Antitrust.

Fagg received his bachelor's degree from the University of Southern California in 1956. He received an MBA from Harvard Business School in 1960 and a JD from the University of Michigan Law School in 1963. He then practiced antitrust law with Overton, Lyman and Prince.

In 1967, Fagg married Judith Ann Carlisle. They had one daughter, Catherine L. Carlisle.

Fagg died of melanoma on April 19, 2002. A study room in Wood Hall at Lewis & Clark law school is dedicated to "Fred D. Fagg."
