= Candy cigarette =

Candy in the form of a cigarette

Candy cigarettes
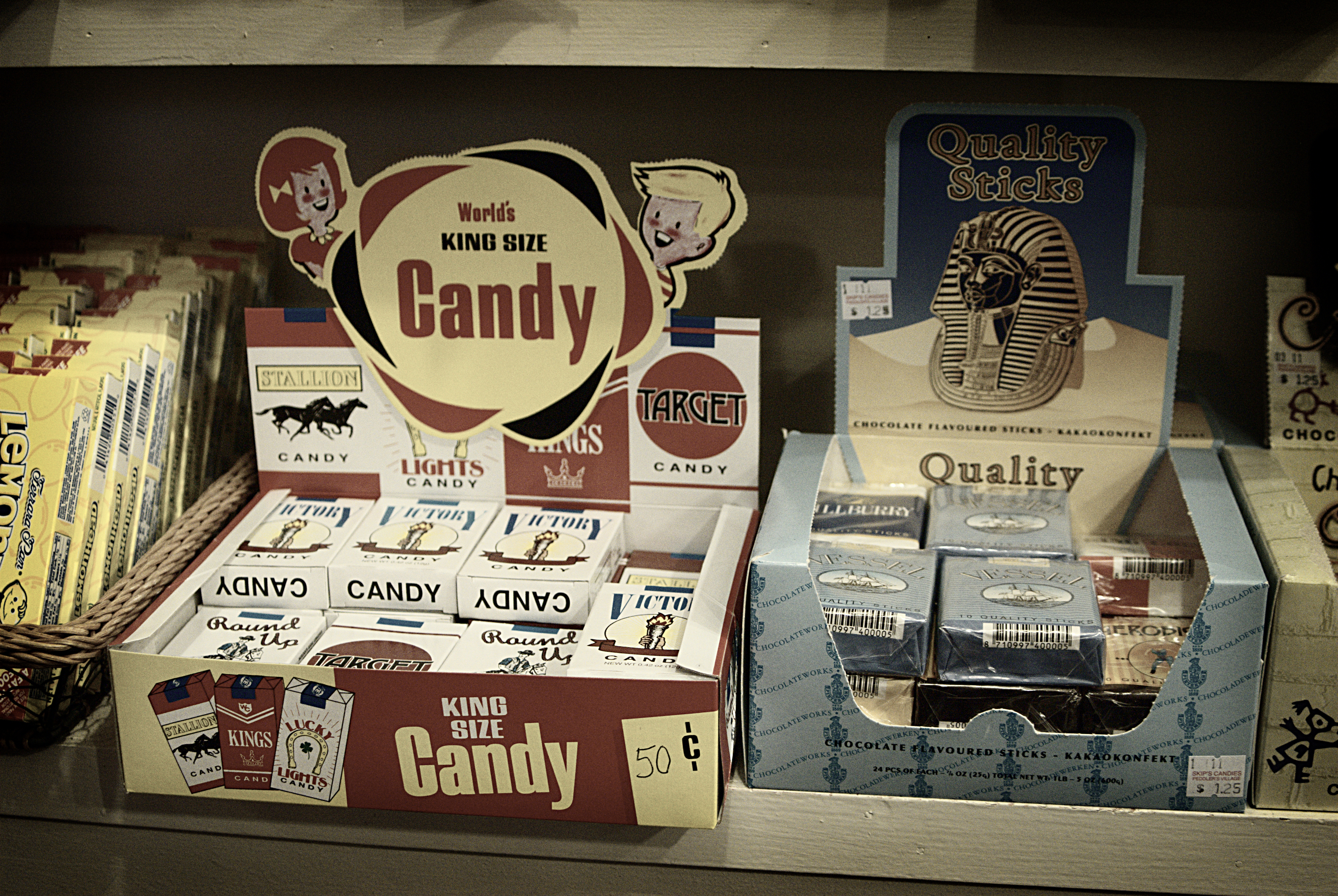
- Alternative names: Candy sticks, candy stix
- Type: Confectionery
- Main ingredients: Sugar
- Variations: Candy, bubble gum, chocolate

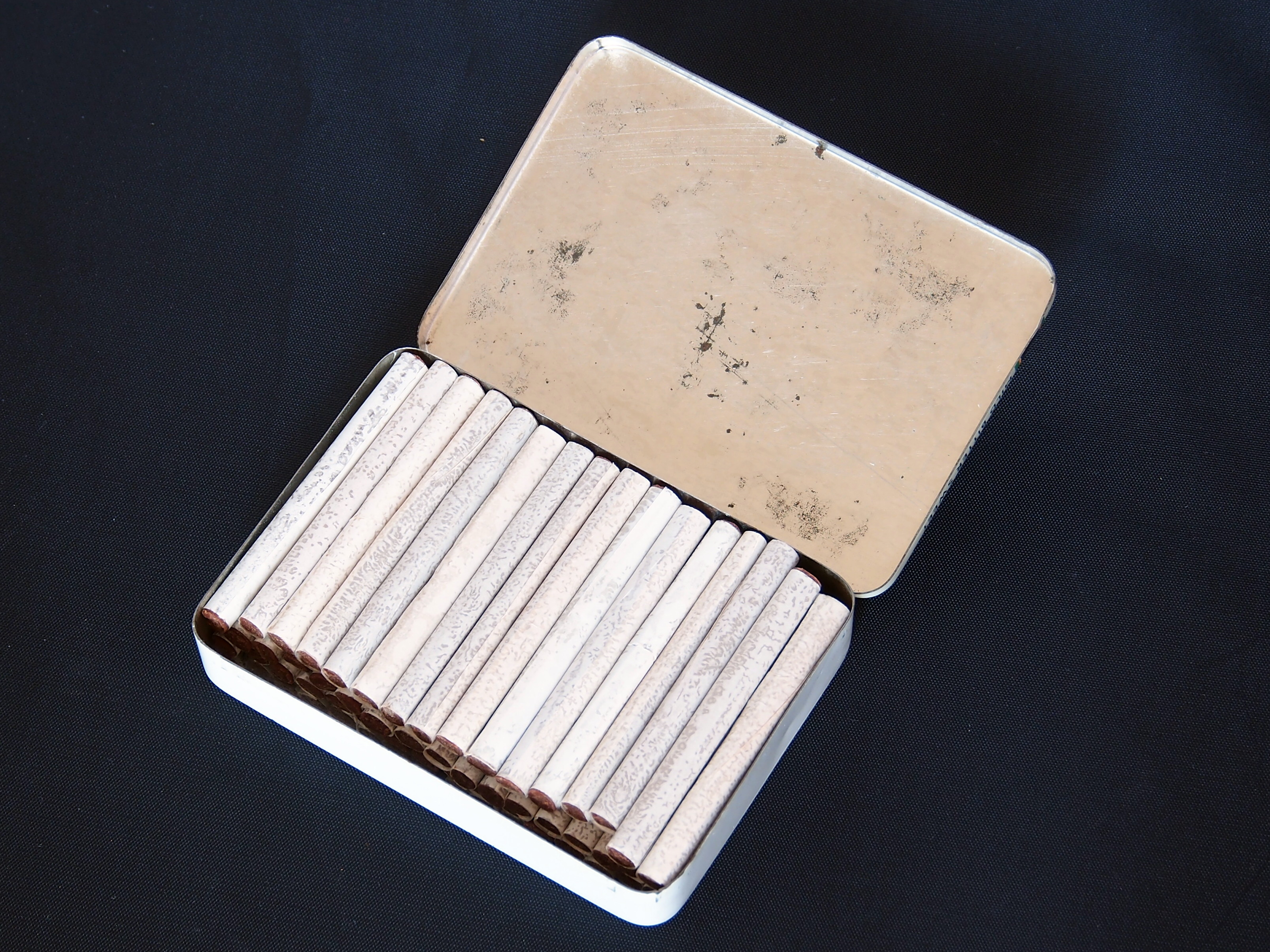
A tin of Droste brand chocolate cigarettes

Candy cigarettes are a candy introduced in the late 19th century made out of chalky sugar, bubblegum or chocolate, wrapped in paper and packaged and branded so as to resemble cigarettes. Some products contain powdered sugar hidden in the wrapper, allowing the user to blow into the cigarette and produce a cloud of sugar that imitates smoke, which comes out of the other end.

Candy cigarettes' existence on the market has long been controversial because research has shown that they prime children to take up smoking real (tobacco) cigarettes. Candy cigarettes can also serve as a way to market cigarettes to children, as many candy cigarettes have branding nearly identical to cigarette brands. Because of this, the selling of candy cigarettes has been banned in several countries, though they continue to be manufactured and consumed in many parts of the world. However, many manufacturers now describe their products as candy sticks, bubble gum, or simply candy.

== Promotion of smoking ==
Tobacco companies and candy cigarette manufacturers have historically cooperated to make candy cigarettes. Tobacco companies have allowed candy cigarette companies to use their branding; Brown & Williamson has gone as far as to send copies of its labels to candy cigarette companies. After the 1964 Surgeon General's report on smoking and health criticized candy cigarettes for "trying to lure youngsters into the smoking habit", tobacco companies began to distance themselves from candy cigarettes, although trademark infringement lawsuits against candy cigarette manufacturers have been rare.

A 1990 study found that sixth graders who ate candy cigarettes were twice as likely to smoke cigarettes as those who did not eat candy cigarettes. A 2007 study surveyed 25,887 adults and found that "candy cigarette consumption was reported by 88% of both current and former smokers and 78% of never smokers", a statistically significant difference that the authors suggested indicates a connection between candy cigarette consumption as a child and smoking as an adult.

In the United States, it was reported erroneously in 2010 that the Family Smoking Prevention and Tobacco Control Act bans candy cigarettes. However, the law bans any form of added flavoring in tobacco cigarettes other than menthol. It does not regulate the candy industry. Popeye Cigarettes marketed using the Popeye character were sold for a while and had red tips (to look like a lit cigarette) before being renamed candy sticks and being manufactured without the red tip. Most candy cigarettes continue to be manufactured in the United States, with the largest maker of candy cigarettes, World Confections, Inc., based in New Jersey.

== Sales laws ==
Country	Law	Notes
Argentina	Legal	
Armenia	Banned	
Australia	Banned	
Austria	Legal	
Bahrain	Banned	
Brazil	Banned	
Canada	Partial	Federal law prohibits candy cigarette branding that resembles real cigarette branding and vice versa.
Chile	Banned	
Denmark	Legal	
Finland	Banned	
Georgia	Banned	
Germany	Legal	
Iceland	Banned	
Ireland	Banned	
Israel	Banned	
Japan	Legal	
Kuwait	Banned	
Latvia	Banned	Banned on 31 July 2005
Lithuania	Banned	
Moldova	Banned	
Netherlands	Banned	
New Zealand	Partial	There are restrictions on advertising and display. They can not be displayed within a metre of tobacco products.
Norway	Banned	
Oman	Banned	
Philippines	Partial	Strictly enforced, discouraged use
Poland	Legal	
Portugal	Banned	
Romania	Partial	
Qatar	Banned	
Saudi Arabia	Banned	
Slovenia	Banned	
South Africa	Banned	Banned in terms of section 4(3) of the Tobacco Products Control Act, 1993
South Korea	Banned	
Spain	Banned	As part of the Ley antitabaco, article 3.2.
Sweden	Banned	
Switzerland	Legal	
Thailand	Banned	
Turkey	Banned	
United Arab Emirates	Banned	
United Kingdom	Partial	Product still available labeled as 'candy sticks' to remove association with smoking
United States	Partial	Candy cannot be labeled as cigarettes.

Sub-national state, etc.	Law	Notes
New South Wales	Banned	Banned since 1999
North Dakota	?	Enacted a ban on candy cigarettes from 1953 until 1967
Nunavut	Banned	Banned all products that resemble cigarettes
Tennessee	Banned	

Locality	Law	Notes
St. Paul, Minnesota	Banned	Banned since April 2009

== See also ==
- Big League Chew
- Bubble pipe
- FADS Fun Sticks
- Hippy Sippy
- Licorice pipe
