= Fred D. Fagg Jr. =

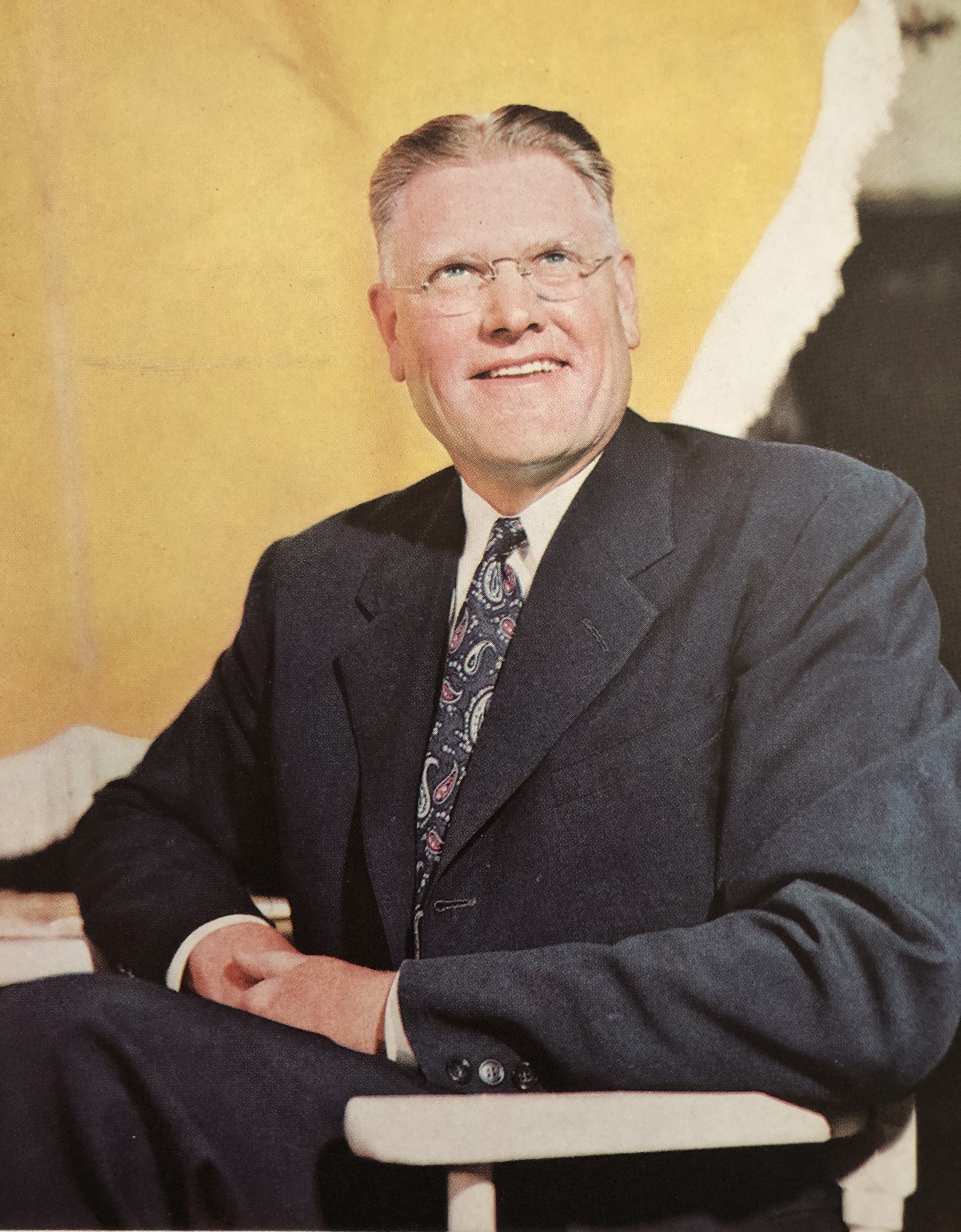
Fagg c. 1949

Fred Dow Fagg Jr. (1896 – October 14, 1981) was president of the University of Southern California between 1947 and 1957.

== Biography ==
Fagg attended the University of Redlands, where he was a founding member of Kappa Sigma Sigma. During World War I he became a pursuit pilot in the U.S. Air Service, based in England with the 92d Aero Squadron. Fagg received a law degree in 1927 from Northwestern University and later taught there. He was the fourth dean of Kellogg School of Management, from 1937 to 1939. He was also the second of three directors of the short-lived Bureau of Air Commerce in the United States Department of Commerce, from March 1937 to April 1938.

Fagg's son, Fred D. Fagg III, was dean of the Northwestern School of Law at Lewis & Clark, now Lewis and Clark Law School.

Academic offices
Preceded by Rufus B. von KleinSmid	President of the University of Southern California; 1947-1957	Succeeded by Norman Topping
