= FADS Fun Sticks =

Brand of candy cigarette

FADS Fun Sticks (2000s onwards)

FADS Fun Sticks, formerly known as FAGS, and later FADS, are a brand of candy cigarette initially made by Riviera Confectionery (a division of Fyna Foods Australia) in Victoria, Australia, until its manufacturing was outsourced at an unknown date to Colombia. First produced as FAGS (British/Australian slang for cigarettes) in 1943, during the 1990s the product was renamed FADS amidst concerns of it promoting smoking to children as well as pejorative connotations of the word. During the 2000s, "Fun Sticks" was added to the name to further distance the product from its connection to cigarettes.

The original candies were modelled after cigarettes, thin white sticks with a red tip to resemble a lit end. The red tip was later removed during the 1990s with the name change.

FAGS
(c. early 1990s with red-tipped candy cigarettes)
(clockwise from left)
Box front, box with top opened and candy cigarettes poking out, side of box.

FADS
(c. mid-1990s)
Most of a flattened FADS box

FAGS/FADS
(c. early 1990s)
Candy alone with "lit" red tips.
