= Hippy Sippy =

Type of candy

Hippy Sippy was a candy introduced in the late 1960s. It consisted of small, multi-colored chocolate pellets contained in a plastic ampoule, with a straw provided to suck the candy from the container. Also included was a button badge with the phrase "Hippy Sippy says I'll try anything" or "please feed me" printed on it.

The packaging was seen by some as resembling a syringe, and drew criticism for potentially normalizing drug use. The FDA classified the packaging as a health hazard over concerns that pellets could be inhaled through the straw and into the respiratory tract.

The product was removed from the market within a few months.

== See also ==
- Candy cigarette
- Bubble pipe
- List of confectionery brands
