= Brian Michael Bendis bibliography =

- Active period: 1991–present

Publishers
- Caliber Comics: 1991–1997
- Image Comics: 1996–2004
- Marvel Comics: 2000–2018
- Icon Comics: 2004–2017
- DC Comics: 2018–2022

This is a bibliography of the comic book writer Brian Michael Bendis, who has created comics for several different publishers.

== Caliber Comics ==
Titles published by Caliber include:

- Quivers #1–2 (script and art, 1991)
- Parts of a Hole (script and art, one-shot, 1991)
- Spunky Todd the Psychic Boy (script and art, one-shot, 1992)
- Sinergy #2 (as artist — among others; written by Kyle Garrett, 1993) collected in Sinergy (tpb, 172 pages, 1994, ISBN 0-941613-57-7)
- The Realm vol. 2 #1–4 (as artist — with Donald Marquez and Patrick Zircher; written by Brent Truax) and #5–6 (covers only, 1993)
- Fire #1–2 (script and art, 1993) collected as Project Fire: Complete (tpb, 116 pages, 1993, ISBN 0-941613-61-5)
  - Re-mastered and re-released under Image as Fire (tpb, 120 pages, 2001, ISBN 1-58240-071-7)
  - Re-released under Marvel's Icon imprint as Fire (hc, 112 pages, 2014, ISBN 0-7851-9102-X)
  - Re-released under DC's Jinxworld label as Fire (tpb, 112 pages, 2019, ISBN 1-4012-9053-1)
- High Caliber: An Anthology of Original Visions: "Borderland" (script and art, anthology, 1994)
- A.K.A. Goldfish #1–5 (script and art, 1994–1995) collected as A.K.A. Goldfish (tpb, 272 pages, 1996, ISBN 0-941613-85-2)
  - Re-mastered and re-released under Image as Goldfish (tpb, 272 pages, 2001, ISBN 1-58240-195-0; hc, 2003, ISBN 1-58240-280-9)
  - Re-released under Marvel's Icon imprint as Goldfish (hc, 272 pages, 2012, ISBN 0-7851-6396-4)
  - Re-released under DC's Jinxworld label as Goldfish (tpb, 272 pages, 2018, ISBN 1-4012-8749-2)
- Negative Burn (anthology):
  - "The Real Thing" (script and art, in #13, 1994)
  - "The Kiss Off" (as artist, written by James D. Hudnall, in #26, 1995)
  - "Jinx" (script and art, in #31, 1996)
  - "Better Living Through Chemistry" (as artist, written by Warren Ellis, in #37, 1996)
- Flaxen: Alter Ego (as artist, written by James D. Hudnall, one-shot, 1995)
- Jinx (script and art):
  - Jinx #1–7 (1996–1997) and Jinx Special (plot assist by Mark Scott Ricketts, art assist by David Mack and Galen Showman, 1997)
    - Reprinted under Image along with the second volume as Jinx: The Definitive Collection (tpb, 480 pages, 2001, ISBN 1-58240-179-9)
    - Re-released under Marvel's Icon imprint along with the second volume as Jinx: The Essential Collection (hc, 480 pages, 2011, ISBN 0-7851-5672-0)
    - Re-released under DC's Jinxworld label along with the second volume as Jinx: The Essential Collection (tpb, 480 pages, 2019, ISBN 1-4012-8750-6)
- Nowheresville: The History of Cool: "The Whole Thing is Wrong" (as artist — among others; written by Mark Scott Ricketts, one-shot, 1997)

== Other early work ==
Titles published by various American publishers in the earlier part of Bendis' career include:

- H. P. Lovecraft's Cthulhu: The Festival #1–3 (as artist — with David Mack; written by Jean-Marc Lofficier, Randy Lofficier and Roy Thomas, Millennium, 1993–1994)
- Noir Quarterly vol. 2 #2: "John Easy: They're Gonna Kill You After Awhile" (illustrations for a text story written by Ron Goulart, anthology, CFD Productions, 1995)
- Spandex Tights Summer Special (one-page illustration for a story written by Bryan J. L. Glass, among other artists, Lost Cause, 1995)
- Malibu:
  - Star Trek: Deep Space Nine—The Maquis #1: "Memoirs of an Invisible Ferengi" (as artist, written by Colin Clayton and Chris Dows, co-feature, 1995)
  - Angels of Destruction (with Robert DeCastro, Shannon Gallant, Vinton T. Heuck and a framing sequence by Leonard Kirk, Ultraverse, one-shot, 1996)
- Fortune and Glory #1–3 (script and art, Oni Press, 1999–2000) collected as Fortune and Glory: A True Hollywood Comic Book Story (tpb, 152 pages, 2000, ISBN 1-929998-06-6)
  - The story was colorized and re-released under Marvel's Icon imprint as Fortune and Glory: A True Hollywood Comic Book Story (hc, 160 pages, 2010, ISBN 0-7851-4309-2)
  - The colorized version was re-released under DC's Jinxworld label as Fortune and Glory: A True Hollywood Comic Book Story (tpb, 160 pages, 2019, ISBN 1-4012-9054-X)
- Occupational Hazards #2: "My Blue Heaven" (script by Marc Bryant from a story by Bendis, art by Brett Feschuk, anthology, CD Comics, 2000)
- GamePro #147 (untitled 8-page story set in the world of the 2000 Spider-Man video game, with Christian Gossett, IDG Communications, 2000)
- Dark Horse Maverick: Happy Endings: "Only in..." (with Michael Avon Oeming, anthology graphic novel, 96 pages, Dark Horse, 2002, ISBN 1-56971-820-2)

== Image Comics ==
Titles published by Image include:

- Jinx (script and art):
  - Jinx vol. 2 #1–5 (1997–1998)
    - Reprinted along with the first volume and Jinx Special as Jinx: The Definitive Collection (tpb, 480 pages, 2001, ISBN 1-58240-179-9)
    - Re-released under Marvel's Icon imprint along with the first volume as Jinx: The Essential Collection (hc, 480 pages, 2011, ISBN 0-7851-5672-0)
    - Re-released under DC's Jinxworld label along with the first volume as Jinx: The Essential Collection (tpb, 480 pages, 2019, ISBN 1-4012-8750-6)
  - Jinx: Buried Treasures (one-shot collection of reprints from High Caliber, Negative Burn and Nowheresville with other assorted short stories, 1998)
  - Jinx: True Crime Confessions (one-shot collection of short strips including one drawn by Michael Avon Oeming, 1998)
  - Jinx: Torso #1–6 (co-written by Bendis and Marc Andreyko, 1998–1999) collected as Torso (tpb, 280 pages, 2001, ISBN 1-58240-174-8)
    - Cover title is Torso, but the indicia title is Jinx: Torso in issues #1, 3 and 6 (other issues have no indicia).
    - Re-released under Marvel's Icon imprint as Torso (hc, 280 pages, 2012, ISBN 0-7851-5356-X)
    - Re-released under DC's Jinxworld label as Torso (tpb, 280 pages, 2019, ISBN 1-4012-9052-3)
  - Jinx: Pop Culture Hoo-Hah (one-shot collection of short strips, 1998)
- Lili #0 (co-written by Bendis and Michael Yanover, art by Waltrip brothers, 1999)
- Todd McFarlane Productions:
  - Sam and Twitch (with Angel Medina, Jamie Tolagson, Alberto Ponticelli, Clayton Crain and Alex Maleev, 1999–2001) collected in:
    - Sam and Twitch: The Complete Collection Volume 1 (collects #1–13, hc, 320 pages, 2011, ISBN 1-60706-240-2)
    - Sam and Twitch: The Complete Collection Volume 2 (includes #14–19, hc, 320 pages, 2012, ISBN 1-60706-242-9)
  - Hellspawn #1–6 (with Ashley Wood, 2000–2001) collected in Hellspawn: The Complete Collection (hc, 500 pages, 2010, ISBN 1-60706-155-4)
- Powers (with Michael Avon Oeming):
  - Powers (2000–2004) collected as:
    - The Definitive Collection Volume 1 (collects #1–11, hc, 464 pages, Icon, 2006, ISBN 0-7851-1805-5; tpb, DC's Jinxworld, 2018, ISBN 1-4012-8745-X)
    - The Definitive Collection Volume 2 (collects #12–24 and Annual #1, hc, 480 pages, Icon, 2009, ISBN 0-7851-2440-3; tpb, DC's Jinxworld, 2019, ISBN 1-4012-8748-4)
    - The Definitive Collection Volume 3 (collects #25–37, hc, 496 pages, Icon, 2010, ISBN 0-7851-3309-7; tpb, DC's Jinxworld, 2019, ISBN 1-4012-9050-7)
      - Includes the "Who Killed Madman?" short story from Oni Press Color Special '01 (anthology, Oni Press, 2001)
  - Crossover #10 (six-page segment featuring Christian Walker and Deena Pilgrim, 2021) collected in Crossover: The Ten-Cent Plague (tpb, 176 pages, 2022, ISBN 1-5343-1928-X)
- Total Sell Out (script and art, collects short crime and autobiographical comics plus humor strips originally published in the Cleveland Plain Dealer, tpb, 158 pages, 2003, ISBN 1-58240-287-6)
- Where We Live: A Benefit for the Survivors in Las Vegas: "Untitled" (with Michael Avon Oeming, anthology graphic novel, 336 pages, 2018, ISBN 1-5343-0822-9)
- The Old Guard: Tales Through Time #3: "Passchendaele" (with Michael Avon Oeming, anthology, 2021) collected in The Old Guard: Tales Through Time (tpb, 176 pages, 2021, ISBN 1-5343-2005-9)
- What's the Furthest Place from Here? #1 (cover illustration, 2021)
- Primordial #6 (cover illustration, 2022)

== Marvel Comics ==
Titles published by Marvel include:

- Daredevil:
  - Daredevil: Ninja #1–3 (with Rob Haynes, Marvel Knights, 2000–2001) collected as Daredevil: Ninja (tpb, 80 pages, 2001, ISBN 0-7851-0780-0)
  - Daredevil vol. 2 (with David Mack, Alex Maleev, Manuel Gutiérrez (#38–39) and Terry Dodson (#40), Marvel Knights, 2001–2006) collected as:
    - Daredevil by Brian Michael Bendis and Alex Maleev Omnibus Volume 1 (collects #16–19, 26–50, 56–60, hc, 488 pages, 2008, ISBN 0-7851-3112-4)
    - Daredevil by Brian Michael Bendis and Alex Maleev Omnibus Volume 2 (collects #61–81 and Ultimate Marvel Team-Up #6–8, hc, 656 pages, 2010, ISBN 0-7851-3813-7)
    - Ultimate Collection: Daredevil by Brian Michael Bendis and Alex Maleev Volume 1 (collects #16–19, 26–40, tpb, 488 pages, 2010, ISBN 0-7851-4388-2)
    - Ultimate Collection: Daredevil by Brian Michael Bendis and Alex Maleev Volume 2 (collects #41–50, 56–65, tpb, 512 pages, 2010, ISBN 0-7851-4950-3)
    - Ultimate Collection: Daredevil by Brian Michael Bendis and Alex Maleev Volume 3 (collects #66–81, tpb, 512 pages, 2010, ISBN 0-7851-4951-1)
  - Elektra vol. 2 #1–6 (with Chuck Austen, Marvel Knights, 2001–2002) collected as Elektra: The Scorpio Key (tpb, 160 pages, 2002, ISBN 0-7851-0843-2)
  - What If... Karen Page Had Lived? (with Michael Lark, one-shot, 2005) collected in What If... Why Not? (tpb, 152 pages, 2005, ISBN 0-7851-1593-5) and Daredevil Omnibus Volume 2 (hc, 656 pages, 2010, ISBN 0-7851-3813-7)
  - Daredevil: End of Days #1–8 (co-written by Bendis and David Mack, art by Klaus Janson, 2012–2013) collected as Daredevil: End of Days (hc, 216 pages, 2013, ISBN 0-7851-2420-9; tpb, 2014, ISBN 0-7851-4337-8)
- Jessica Jones:
  - Alias (with Michael Gaydos, Bill Sienkiewicz (#7–8), David Mack (#12–13), Mark Bagley (#12, 21, 25–26) and Rick Mays (#26), Marvel MAX, 2001–2004) collected as:
    - Alias Omnibus (collects #1–28, hc, 592 pages, 2006, ISBN 0-7851-2121-8)
    - Ultimate Collection: Alias Volume 1 (collects #1–15, tpb, 360 pages, 2009, ISBN 0-7851-3732-7)
    - Ultimate Collection: Alias Volume 2 (collects #16–28, tpb, 312 pages, 2010, ISBN 0-7851-4490-0)
  - The Pulse #1–14 (with Mark Bagley, Brent Anderson, Michael Lark and Michael Gaydos, 2004–2006) collected as Jessica Jones: The Pulse (tpb, 360 pages, 2014, ISBN 0-7851-9086-4)
  - What If... Jessica Jones Had Joined the Avengers? (with Michael Gaydos, one-shot, 2005) collected in What If... Why Not? (tpb, 152 pages, 2005, ISBN 0-7851-1593-5) and Alias Omnibus (hc, 592 pages, 2006, ISBN 0-7851-2121-8)
  - The Amazing Spider-Man #601: "The Best Version of Myself" (with Joe Quesada, co-feature, 2009) collected in Spider-Man: Died in Your Arms Tonight (hc, 192 pages, 2009, ISBN 0-7851-4459-5; tpb, 2010, ISBN 0-7851-4485-4)
  - Marvel 75th Anniversary Celebration: "Alias" (with Michael Gaydos, anthology one-shot, 2014) collected in Jessica Jones: Avenger (tpb, 184 pages, 2016, ISBN 1-302-90215-6)
  - Jessica Jones (with Michael Gaydos and Javier Pulido (#11–12), 2016–2018) collected as:
    - Uncaged! (collects #1–6, tpb, 136 pages, 2017, ISBN 1-302-90635-6)
    - The Secrets of Maria Hill (collects #7–12, tpb, 136 pages, 2017, ISBN 1-302-90636-4)
    - Return of the Purple Man (collects #13–18, tpb, 136 pages, 2018, ISBN 1-302-90637-2)
- A Moment of Silence: "Moment of Silence: A True Story" (with Scott Morse, anthology one-shot, 2002)
- Secret War #1–5 (with Gabriele Dell'Otto, 2004–2005) collected as Secret War (hc, 256 pages, 2006, ISBN 0-7851-1837-3; tpb, 2009, ISBN 0-7851-4228-2)
- The Avengers:
  - The Avengers #500–503 and The Avengers Finale (with David Finch, 2004–2005) collected as The Avengers: Disassembled (hc, 184 pages, 2006, ISBN 0-7851-2294-X; tpb, 2006, ISBN 0-7851-1482-3)
  - The New Avengers (with David Finch, Steve McNiven, Dan Jurgens (America Supports You: The New Avengers one-shot), Frank Cho (#14–15), Mike Deodato, Jr. (#17–20), Alex Maleev (The New Avengers: Illuminati one-shot, #26), Howard Chaykin (#21), Olivier Coipel (#23, Annual #1), Pasqual Ferry (#24), Jim Cheung (#25, 40, 42, 45), Leinil Francis Yu, Carlo Pagulayan (Annual #2), Michael Gaydos (#38 and 47), David Mack (#39), Billy Tan, Chris Bachalo (#51–52), Stuart Immonen, Mike Mayhew (Annual #3) and Daniel Acuña (#61–62), 2005–2010) collected as:
    - Volume 1 (collects #1–10 and America Supports You: The New Avengers, hc, 340 pages, 2007, ISBN 0-7851-2464-0)
    - Volume 2 (collects #11–20 and Annual #1, hc, 296 pages, 2008, ISBN 0-7851-3085-3)
      - Includes the "Choices" short story (art by Rick Mays) from Giant-Size Spider-Woman (one-shot, 2005)
    - Volume 3 (collects #21–31 and The New Avengers: Illuminati, hc, 360 pages, 2009, ISBN 0-7851-3763-7)
      - Includes the Civil War: The Confession one-shot (written by Bendis, art by Alex Maleev, 2007)
      - Includes the Civil War: The Initiative one-shot (written by Bendis, art by Marc Silvestri, 2007)
    - Volume 4 (collects #32–37 and Annual #2, hc, 320 pages, 2010, ISBN 0-7851-4262-2)
      - Includes the 5-issue spin-off limited series The New Avengers: Illuminati (co-written by Bendis and Brian Reed, art by Jim Cheung, 2007–2008)
    - Volume 5 (collects #38–47 and the Free Comic Book Day 2009: The Avengers special, hc, 256 pages, 2010, ISBN 0-7851-4579-6)
    - Volume 6 (collects #48–54, hc, 256 pages, 2011, ISBN 0-7851-5648-8)
      - Includes the Secret Invasion: Dark Reign one-shot (written by Bendis, art by Alex Maleev, 2009)
    - Volume 7 (collects #55–64, Annual #3 and The New Avengers Finale, hc, 368 pages, 2011, ISBN 0-7851-5676-3)
      - Includes the Dark Reign: The List—The Avengers one-shot (written by Bendis, art by Marko Djurdjević, 2009)
  - The Mighty Avengers (with Frank Cho, Mark Bagley, Marko Djurdjević (#9 and 11), Alex Maleev (#12–13), Khoi Pham, John Romita, Jr. (#15), Stefano Caselli (#18) and Lee Weeks + Carlo Pagulayan + Jim Cheung (#20), 2007–2009) collected as:
    - Volume 1 (collects #1–11, hc, 304 pages, 2009, ISBN 0-7851-3758-0)
    - Volume 2 (collects #12–20, hc, 232 pages, 2010, ISBN 0-7851-4261-4)
    - The Mighty Avengers by Brian Michael Bendis: The Complete Collection (collects #1–20, tpb, 512 pages, 2017, ISBN 1-302-90338-1)
  - Dark Avengers #1–6, 9–16 and Annual (with Mike Deodato, Jr., Greg Horn (#11–12) and Chris Bachalo (Dark Avengers Annual), 2009–2010) collected as Dark Avengers (hc, 400 pages, 2011, ISBN 0-7851-5650-X; tpb, 2017, ISBN 1-302-90801-4)
  - The Avengers vol. 4 (with John Romita, Jr., Bryan Hitch (#12.1), Chris Bachalo (#13 and 15), Daniel Acuña, Renato Guedes (#21–22), Walt Simonson, Brandon Peterson + Mike Mayhew (#31–32, 34) and Terry Dodson (#33–34), 2010–2012) collected as:
    - The Avengers by Brian Michael Bendis Volume 1 (collects #1–6, hc, 160 pages, 2011, ISBN 0-7851-4500-1; tpb, 2011, ISBN 0-7851-4501-X)
    - The Avengers by Brian Michael Bendis Volume 2 (collects #7–12 and 12.1, hc, 176 pages, 2011, ISBN 0-7851-4504-4; tpb, 2012, ISBN 0-7851-4505-2)
    - Fear Itself: The Avengers (includes #13-17, hc, 184 pages, 2012, ISBN 0-7851-6348-4; tpb, 2012, ISBN 0-7851-6349-2)
    - The Avengers by Brian Michael Bendis Volume 3 (collects #18–24 and 24.1, hc, 184 pages, 2012, ISBN 0-7851-5116-8; tpb, 2012, ISBN 0-7851-5117-6)
    - The Avengers by Brian Michael Bendis Volume 4 (collects #25–30, hc, 136 pages, 2013, ISBN 0-7851-6079-5; tpb, 2013, ISBN 0-7851-6080-9)
    - The Avengers by Brian Michael Bendis Volume 5 (collects #31–34, Annual #1 and The New Avengers vol. 2 Annual #1, hc, 176 pages, 2013, ISBN 0-7851-6081-7; tpb, 2013, ISBN 0-7851-6082-5)
  - The New Avengers vol. 2 (with Stuart Immonen, Daniel Acuña (#8), Howard Chaykin (#9–13), Mike Deodato, Jr., Neal Adams (#16.1), Michael Gaydos (#31), Carlos Pacheco (#32) and Michael Avon Oeming (#33), 2010–2012) collected as:
    - The New Avengers by Brian Michael Bendis Volume 1 (collects #1–6, hc, 160 pages, 2011, ISBN 0-7851-4872-8; tpb, 2011, ISBN 0-7851-4873-6)
    - The New Avengers by Brian Michael Bendis Volume 2 (collects #7–13, hc, 168 pages, 2011, ISBN 0-7851-4874-4; tpb, 2012, ISBN 0-7851-4875-2)
    - Fear Itself: The Avengers (includes #14-16, hc, 184 pages, 2012, ISBN 0-7851-6348-4; tpb, 2012, ISBN 0-7851-6349-2)
    - The New Avengers by Brian Michael Bendis Volume 3 (collects #17–23 and 16.1, hc, 184 pages, 2012, ISBN 0-7851-5179-6; tpb, 2012, ISBN 0-7851-5180-X)
    - The New Avengers by Brian Michael Bendis Volume 4 (collects #24–30, hc, 160 pages, 2012, ISBN 0-7851-6156-2; tpb, 2013, ISBN 0-7851-6157-0)
    - The New Avengers by Brian Michael Bendis Volume 5 (collects #31–34, hc, 112 pages, 2013, ISBN 0-7851-6158-9; tpb, 2013, ISBN 0-7851-6159-7)
  - Avengers Prime #1–5 (with Alan Davis, 2010–2011) collected as Avengers Prime (hc, 128 pages, 2011, ISBN 0-7851-4725-X; tpb, 2011, ISBN 0-7851-4726-8)
  - Avengers Assemble #1–8 (with Mark Bagley, 2012) collected as Avengers Assemble (hc, 184 pages, 2013, ISBN 0-7851-6327-1; tpb, 2013, ISBN 0-7851-6328-X)
- House of M #1–8 (with Olivier Coipel, 2005) collected as House of M (tpb, 224 pages, 2006, ISBN 0-7851-1721-0; hc, 312 pages, 2008, ISBN 0-7851-2466-7)
- Wha... Huh? (with Jim Mahfood, among other writers, one-shot, 2005) collected in Secret Wars Too (tpb, 208 pages, 2016, ISBN 1-302-90211-3)
- Spider-Woman:
  - Spider-Woman: Origin #1–6 (co-written by Bendis and Brian Reed, art by Luna brothers, 2006) collected as Spider-Woman: Origin (hc, 120 pages, 2006, ISBN 0-7851-1965-5; tpb, 2007, ISBN 0-7851-1966-3)
  - Spider-Woman vol. 4 #1–7: "Agent of S.W.O.R.D." (with Alex Maleev, 2009–2010) collected as Spider-Woman: Agent of S.W.O.R.D. (hc, 176 pages, 2010, ISBN 0-7851-1999-X; tpb, 2011, ISBN 0-7851-2630-9)
- Stan Lee Meets Doctor Strange: "Where is Stan the Man When You Need Him?" (with Mark Bagley, co-feature in one-shot, 2006) collected in Stan Lee Meets... (hc, 240 pages, 2007, ISBN 0-7851-2272-9)
- Spider-Man 3: The Black (with Mark Bagley, promotional tie-in one-shot distributed for free with specially packaged Spider-Man 3 DVDs sold at Walmart, 2007)
- Halo: Uprising #1–4 (with Alex Maleev, 2007–2009) collected as Halo: Uprising (hc, 168 pages, 2009, ISBN 0-7851-2838-7; tpb, 2010, ISBN 0-7851-2839-5)
- Secret Invasion #1–8 (with Leinil Francis Yu, 2008) collected as Secret Invasion (tpb, 248 pages, 2009, ISBN 0-7851-3297-X; hc, 2010, ISBN 0-7851-4917-1)
- Secret Warriors: The Complete Collection Volume 1 (tpb, 480 pages, 2015, ISBN 0-7851-9763-X) includes:
  - Dark Reign: New Nation: "Declaration" (co-written by Bendis and Jonathan Hickman, art by Stefano Caselli, anthology one-shot, 2008)
  - Secret Warriors #1–6: "Nick Fury, Agent of Nothing" (co-written by Bendis and Jonathan Hickman, art by Stefano Caselli, 2009)
- Siege (hc, 200 pages, 2010, ISBN 0-7851-4810-8; tpb, 2010, ISBN 0-7851-4079-4) collects:
  - Siege: Prologue (with Lucio Parrillo, free digital mini-comic, 2009)
  - Siege: The Cabal (with Michael Lark, one-shot, 2010)
  - Siege #1–4 (with Olivier Coipel, 2010)
- Breaking into Comics the Marvel Way! #1: "Modern Love" (with Christian Nauck, anthology, 2010)
- Philip K. Dick's Electric Ant #1–5 (as "consulting editor"; written by David Mack, drawn by Pascal Alixe, 2010)
- Castle (series of graphic novels co-written by Bendis and Kelly Sue DeConnick):
  - Richard Castle's Deadly Storm: A Derrick Storm Mystery (with Lan Medina and Tom Raney, hc, 112 pages, 2011, ISBN 0-7851-5327-6; sc, 2013, ISBN 0-7851-5329-2)
  - Richard Castle's Storm Season: A Derrick Storm Mystery (with Emanuela Lupacchino, hc, 112 pages, 2012, ISBN 0-7851-6482-0; sc, 2014, ISBN 0-7851-6483-9)
- Moon Knight vol. 3 #1–12 (with Alex Maleev, 2011–2012) collected as Moon Knight by Brian Michael Bendis and Alex Maleev (hc, 288 pages, 2018, ISBN 1-302-90999-1; tpb, 2022, ISBN 1-302-93362-0)
- Avengers vs. X-Men (hc, 568 pages, 2012, ISBN 0-7851-6317-4) includes:
  - Avengers vs. X-Men #0 (Scarlet Witch story, with Frank Cho) — #1 (with John Romita, Jr.) — #8 (with Adam Kubert) — #11 (with Olivier Coipel, 2012) also collected in Avengers vs. X-Men (tpb, 384 pages, 2013, ISBN 0-7851-6318-2)
  - AvX: VS #6: "Cyclops vs. Captain America" (with Jim Mahfood, anthology, 2012) also collected in Avengers vs. X-Men: VS (tpb, 160 pages, 2013, ISBN 0-7851-6520-7)
- X-Men:
  - All-New X-Men (with Stuart Immonen, David Marquez (#6–7), David Lafuente (#15), Brandon Peterson (#19–21), Sara Pichelli (#30), Mahmud Asrar, Mike del Mundo (#37) and Andrea Sorrentino (#38–39), 2013–2015) collected as:
    - Volume 1 (collects #1–10, hc, 272 pages, 2014, ISBN 0-7851-9115-1)
    - Volume 2 (collects #11–15 and 18–21, hc, 272 pages, 2015, ISBN 0-7851-9822-9)
    - X-Men: Battle of the Atom (includes #16–17, hc, 248 pages, 2014, ISBN 0-7851-8906-8; tpb, 2014, ISBN 0-7851-8907-6)
      - Also collects X-Men: Battle of the Atom #1 (of 2) (written by Bendis, art by Frank Cho and Stuart Immonen, 2013)
      - Also collects an epilogue from X-Men: Battle of the Atom #2 (of 2) (written by Bendis, art by Stuart Immonen, 2013)
    - Volume 3 (collects #22–30 and Guardians of the Galaxy vol. 3 #11–13, hc, 288 pages, 2015, ISBN 0-7851-9823-7)
    - Volume 4 (collects #31–41, hc, 256 pages, 2016, ISBN 0-7851-9989-6)
  - Uncanny X-Men vol. 3 (with Chris Bachalo, Frazer Irving, Kris Anka, Marco Rudy (#18) and Valerio Schiti (#35), 2013–2015) collected as:
    - Volume 1 (collects #1–11 and 14–18, hc, 384 pages, 2016, ISBN 0-7851-9532-7)
    - X-Men: Battle of the Atom (includes #12–13, hc, 248 pages, 2014, ISBN 0-7851-8906-8; tpb, 2014, ISBN 0-7851-8907-6)
    - Volume 2 (collects #19–35, 600, Annual #1 and All-New X-Men Annual #1, hc, 496 pages, 2016, ISBN 1-302-90171-0)
  - Secret Wars: Old Man Logan #1–5 (with Andrea Sorrentino, 2015) collected as Wolverine—Old Man Logan: Warzones! (tpb, 136 pages, 2015, ISBN 0-7851-9893-8)
- Guardians of the Galaxy:
  - Guardians of the Galaxy (with Steve McNiven, Sara Pichelli, Olivier Coipel (vol. 3 #6), Valerio Schiti, Francesco Francavilla (vol. 3 #8–9), Kevin Maguire (vol. 3 #10 and vol. 4 #14), Stuart Immonen (vol. 3 #12), David Marquez (vol. 3 #13, 16), Nick Bradshaw (vol. 3 #14–17), Jason Masters vol. 3 #14–16), Cameron Stewart (vol. 3 #15), Michael Avon Oeming (vol. 3 #17), Ed McGuiness (vol. 3 #18–20), Frank Cho (Annual) and David López (vol. 3 #22); with the addition of the character Angela, Neil Gaiman is credited as "consultant" in vol. 3 #5–8, 2013–2017) collected as:
    - Volume 1 (collects vol. 3 #0.1 and 1–10, hc, 312 pages, 2015, ISBN 0-7851-9400-2)
      - Includes the 4-issue limited series Infinite Comics: Guardians of the Galaxy (written by Bendis, art by Michael Avon Oeming (#1), Ming Doyle (#2) and Mike del Mundo (#3–4), 2013)
    - Volume 2 (collects vol. 3 #11–17, All-New X-Men #22–24 and the Free Comic Book Day 2014: Guardians of the Galaxy special, hc, 248 pages, 2016, ISBN 0-7851-9824-5)
    - Volume 3 (collects vol. 3 #18–27 and Annual #1, hc, 272 pages, 2016, ISBN 1-302-90008-0)
    - Volume 4 (collects vol. 4 #1–10, hc, 240 pages, 2017, ISBN 1-302-90437-X)
    - Volume 5 (collects vol. 4 #11–19 and the Free Comic Book Day 2016: Civil War II special, hc, 272 pages, 2018, ISBN 1-302-90896-0)
  - Guardians Team-Up #1–2 (with Arthur Adams and Stephane Roux, 2015) collected in Guardians Team-Up: Guardians Assemble (tpb, 144 pages, 2015, ISBN 0-7851-9714-1)
  - Secret Wars: Guardians of Knowhere #1–4 (with Mike Deodato, Jr., 2015) collected as Secret Wars — Warzones: Guardians of Knowhere (tpb, 120 pages, 2015, ISBN 0-7851-9844-X)
- Age of Ultron #1–10 (with Bryan Hitch, Brandon Peterson and Carlos Pacheco, 2013) collected as Age of Ultron (hc, 504 pages, 2013, ISBN 0-7851-5565-1; tpb, 288 pages, 2014, ISBN 0-7851-5566-X)
- Iron Man:
  - Invincible Iron Man vol. 2 #1–14 (with David Marquez and Mike Deodato, Jr., 2015–2016)
    - Collected as Iron Man by Brian Michael Bendis (hc, 328 pages, 2018, ISBN 1-302-90448-5)
    - Collected as Ironheart: The Saga of Riri Williams (tpb, 328 pages, 2023, ISBN 1-302-95150-5)
  - International Iron Man #1–7 (with Alex Maleev, 2016–2017) collected as International Iron Man (hc, 160 pages, 2016, ISBN 1-302-90149-4; tpb, 2017, ISBN 0-7851-9979-9)
  - Infamous Iron Man by Brian Michael Bendis and Alex Maleev (tpb, 480 pages, 2023, ISBN 1-302-95260-9) collects:
    - Infamous Iron Man #1–12 (with Alex Maleev, 2016–2017)
    - Invincible Iron Man #593–600 (with Stefano Caselli and Alex Maleev, 2017–2018)
  - Invincible Iron Man vol. 3 #1–11 (with Stefano Caselli, 2017) collected as Ironheart: Riri Williams (tpb, 264 pages, 2019, ISBN 1-302-91979-2)
- Spider-Man (Miles Morales):
  - Spider-Man vol. 2 (with Sara Pichelli, Nico Leon, Szymon Kudranski (#15) and Oscar Bazaldua, 2016–2018) collected as:
    - Spider-Man: Miles Morales Volume 1 (collects #1–5, tpb, 112 pages, 2016, ISBN 0-7851-9961-6)
    - Spider-Man: Miles Morales Volume 2 (collects #6–11, tpb, 127 pages, 2017, ISBN 0-7851-9962-4)
    - Spider-Man/Spider-Gwen: Sitting in a Tree (includes #12–14, tpb, 136 pages, 2017, ISBN 1-302-90762-X)
    - Spider-Man: Miles Morales Volume 3 (collects #15–21, tpb, 149 pages, 2017, ISBN 1-302-90597-X)
    - Spider-Man: Miles Morales Volume 4 (collects #234–240, tpb, 133 pages, 2018, ISBN 1-302-90598-8)
  - Spider-Men II #1–5 (with Sara Pichelli, 2017) collected as Spider-Men II (tpb, 112 pages, 2018, ISBN 1-302-90883-9)
- Civil War II (hc, 296 pages, 2017, ISBN 1-302-90156-7; tpb, 2017, ISBN 1-302-90157-5) collects:
  - Free Comic Book Day 2016: Civil War II (with Jim Cheung, one-shot, 2016)
  - Civil War II #0 (with Olivier Coipel, 2016)
  - Civil War II #1–8 (with David Marquez, 2016–2017)
- The Defenders vol. 5 (with David Marquez and Michael Avon Oeming (#8), 2017–2018) collected as:
  - Diamonds are Forever (collects #1–6 and the Free Comic Book Day 2017: The Defenders special, tpb, 152 pages, 2017, ISBN 1-302-90746-8)
  - Kingpins of New York (collects #7–12, tpb, 136 pages, 2018, ISBN 1-302-90747-6)
- Generations (hc, 328 pages, 2017, ISBN 1-302-90847-2; tpb, 2018, ISBN 1-302-90848-0) includes:
  - Generations: Iron Man and Ironheart (with Marco Rudy, Szymon Kudranski and Nico Leon, one-shot, 2017)
  - Generations: Miles Morales Spider-Man and Peter Parker Spider-Man (with Ramón K. Pérez, one-shot, 2017)

=== Ultimate Comics ===
Titles published under the Ultimate Marvel label include:

- Spider-Man:
  - Ultimate Spider-Man (with Mark Bagley, Mark Brooks (Annual #1–2), Stuart Immonen, David Lafuente, Takeshi Miyazawa (vol. 2 #7–8) and Sara Pichelli, 2000–2011) collected as:
    - Ultimate Collection: Ultimate Spider-Man Volume 1 (collects #1–13, hc, 352 pages, 2002, ISBN 0-7851-0898-X; tpb, 2007, ISBN 0-7851-2492-6)
    - Ultimate Collection: Ultimate Spider-Man Volume 2 (collects #14–27, hc, 336 pages, 2003, ISBN 0-7851-1061-5; tpb, 2009, ISBN 0-7851-2886-7)
    - Ultimate Collection: Ultimate Spider-Man Volume 3 (collects #½, 28–39, hc, 304 pages, 2003, ISBN 0-7851-1156-5; tpb, 2010, ISBN 0-7851-4919-8)
    - Ultimate Collection: Ultimate Spider-Man Volume 4 (collects #40–45, 47–53, hc, 336 pages, 2004, ISBN 0-7851-1249-9; tpb, 2013, ISBN 0-7851-8437-6)
    - Ultimate Collection: Ultimate Spider-Man Volume 5 (collects #46, 54–59, hc, 352 pages, 2005, ISBN 0-7851-1401-7; tpb, 2015, ISBN 0-7851-9289-1)
      - Includes the 7-issue spin-off limited series Ultimate Six (written by Bendis, art by Joe Quesada (prologue) and Trevor Hairsine, 2003–2004)
    - Ultimate Collection: Ultimate Spider-Man Volume 6 (collects #60–71, hc, 296 pages, 2005, ISBN 0-7851-1841-1; tpb, 2016, ISBN 0-7851-9632-3)
    - Ultimate Collection: Ultimate Spider-Man Volume 7 (collects #72–85, hc, 344 pages, 2005, ISBN 0-7851-2148-X; tpb, 2017, ISBN 1-302-90874-X)
    - Ultimate Collection: Ultimate Spider-Man Volume 8 (collects #86–96 and Annual #1–2, hc, 344 pages, 2007, ISBN 0-7851-2604-X)
    - Ultimate Collection: Ultimate Spider-Man Volume 9 (collects #97–111, hc, 400 pages, 2008, ISBN 0-7851-3081-0)
    - Ultimate Collection: Ultimate Spider-Man Volume 10 (collects #112–122, hc, 272 pages, 2009, ISBN 0-7851-3776-9)
    - Ultimate Collection: Ultimate Spider-Man Volume 11 (collects #123–133 and Annual #3, hc, 384 pages, 2010, ISBN 0-7851-4642-3)
      - Includes the 2-issue spin-off limited series Ultimate Spider-Man Requiem (written by Bendis, art by Stuart Immonen and Mark Bagley, 2009)
    - Ultimate Collection: Ultimate Spider-Man Volume 12 (collects vol. 2 #1–14, hc, 352 pages, 2012, ISBN 0-7851-6462-6)
    - Ultimate Spider-Man: The Death of Spider-Man Omnibus (collects vol. 2 #15 and vol. 1 #150–160, hc, 608 pages, 2012, ISBN 0-7851-6464-2)
      - Includes short stories from the 6-issue spin-off limited series Ultimate Comics: Fallout (written by Bendis, art by Mark Bagley, Sara Pichelli and Gabriel Hardman, 2011)
  - Ultimate Marvel Team-Up #1–16 (with Matt Wagner (#1), Phil Hester (#2–3), Mike Allred (#4–5), Bill Sienkiewicz (#6–8), Jim Mahfood (#9), Ron Randall + John Totleben (#10), Chynna Clugston-Major (#11), Ted McKeever (#12–13), Terry Moore (#14) and Rick Mays (#15–16), 2001–2002) and Ultimate Spider-Man Super Special (with Mark Bagley, David Mack, Jim Mahfood, Alex Maleev, Michael Avon Oeming, Ashley Wood, Bill Sienkiewicz, Dan Brereton, Jacen Burrows, Frank Cho, Michael Gaydos, Dave Gibbons, Leonard Kirk, James Kochalka, Scott Morse, Jason Pearson, Sean Phillips, John Romita, Sr., P. Craig Russell, Craig Thompson and Brett Weldele, 2002) collected as Ultimate Marvel Team-Up (hc, 448 pages, 2002, ISBN 0-7851-0870-X; tpb, 2006, ISBN 0-7851-2361-X)
  - Ultimate Comics: Spider-Man (with Sara Pichelli, Chris Samnee (#6–7), David Marquez and Pepe Larraz (#16–17), 2011–2013) collected as:
    - Ultimate Collection: Miles Morales, Spider-Man Volume 1 (collects #1–12, tpb, 400 pages, 2015, ISBN 0-7851-9778-8)
      - Includes the 5-issue spin-off limited series Spider-Men (written by Bendis, art by Sara Pichelli, 2012)
    - Ultimate Collection: Miles Morales, Spider-Man Volume 2 (collects #13–16, 16.1, 17–28, tpb, 376 pages, 2015, ISBN 0-7851-9779-6)
  - Ultimate Collection: Miles Morales, Spider-Man Volume 3 (tpb, 368 pages, 2015, ISBN 0-7851-9780-X) collects:
    - Cataclysm: Ultimate Spider-Man #1–3 (with David Marquez, 2014)
    - Miles Morales: Ultimate Spider-Man #1–12 (with David Marquez, 2014–2015)
    - Ultimate Spider-Man #200 (with Mark Bagley, Mark Brooks, David Lafuente, David Marquez and Sara Pichelli, 2014)
- Ultimate X-Men #34–45 (with David Finch, 2003–2004) collected as Ultimate Collection: Ultimate X-Men Volume 4 (hc, 304 pages, 2005, ISBN 0-7851-1251-0; tpb, 2010, ISBN 0-7851-4923-6)
- Ultimate Fantastic Four #1–6: "The Fantastic" (co-written by Bendis and Mark Millar, art by Adam Kubert, 2004) collected in Ultimate Fantastic Four Volume 1 (hc, 320 pages, 2005, ISBN 0-7851-1458-0)
- Ultimate Power #1–3 (co-written by Bendis, Jeph Loeb and J. Michael Straczynski, art by Greg Land, 2006–2007) collected in Ultimate Power (hc, 232 pages, 2008, ISBN 0-7851-2366-0; tpb, 2008, ISBN 0-7851-2367-9)
- Ultimate Origins #1–5 (with Butch Guice, 2008) collected as Ultimate Origins (hc, 128 pages, 2009, ISBN 0-7851-2893-X; tpb, 2009, ISBN 0-7851-3035-7)
- Ultimate Comics: Doomsday (hc, 288 pages, 2011, ISBN 0-7851-4776-4; tpb, 2011, ISBN 0-7851-4777-2) collects:
  - Ultimate Comics: Enemy #1–4 (with Rafa Sandoval, 2010)
  - Ultimate Comics: Mystery #1–4 (with Rafa Sandoval, 2010)
  - Ultimate Comics: Doom #1–4 (with Rafa Sandoval, 2011)
- Cataclysm: The Ultimates' Last Stand (hc, 440 pages, 2014, ISBN 0-7851-8919-X; tpb, 2015, ISBN 0-7851-8920-3) collects:
  - Cataclysm: The Ultimates' Last Stand #1–5 (with Mark Bagley, 2014)
  - Cataclysm: Ultimate Spider-Man #1–3 (with David Marquez, 2014)
  - Survive! (with Joe Quinones, one-shot, 2014)
- Secret Wars: Ultimate End #1–5 (with Mark Bagley, 2015–2016) collected as Secret Wars — Battleworld: Ultimate End (tpb, 128 pages, 2016, ISBN 0-7851-9890-3)

=== Icon Comics ===
Titles published by Marvel's Icon imprint include:

- Powers (with Michael Avon Oeming):
  - Powers vol. 2 (2004–2008) collected as:
    - The Definitive Collection Volume 4 (collects #1–18, hc, 600 pages, 2011, ISBN 0-7851-5316-0; tpb, DC's Jinxworld, 2019, ISBN 1-4012-9051-5)
    - The Definitive Collection Volume 5 (collects #19–30 and Annual '08, hc, 464 pages, 2012, ISBN 0-7851-6612-2; tpb, DC's Jinxworld, 2019, ISBN 1-4012-9127-9)
  - Powers vol. 3 #1–11 (2009–2012) collected as Powers: The Definitive Collection Volume 6 (hc, 424 pages, 2014, ISBN 0-7851-9149-6; tpb, DC's Jinxworld, 2019, ISBN 1-77950-073-4)
  - Powers: The Bureau #1–12 (2013–2014) collected as Powers: The Definitive Collection Volume 7 (hc, 368 pages, 2017, ISBN 1-302-90740-9; tpb, DC's Jinxworld, 2019, ISBN 1-77950-074-2)
  - Powers vol. 4 (2015–2017) collected as:
    - All the New Powers (collects #1–6, hc, 200 pages, 2016, ISBN 0-7851-9745-1)
    - The Best Ever (collects #7–8, hc, 264 pages, DC's Jinxworld, 2020, ISBN 1-4012-9888-5)
      - The ongoing series was left on a cliffhanger after Powers vol. 4 #8 due to Bendis' abrupt move from Marvel to DC Comics.
      - This volume repurposes the last two issues of the series with new material, serving as the endpoint for the entire Powers storyline.
- Scarlet (with Alex Maleev, 2010–2016) collected as:
  - Volume 1 (collects #1–5, hc, 176 pages, 2011, ISBN 0-7851-5251-2; tpb, 2016, ISBN 1-302-90152-4)
  - Volume 2 (collects #6–10, hc, 176 pages, 2016, ISBN 0-7851-8429-5; tpb, DC's Jinxworld, 2018, ISBN 1-4012-8747-6)
  - The Absolute Edition (collects #1–10, hc, 352 pages, DC's Jinxworld, 2019, ISBN 1-4012-8972-X)
- Brilliant #1–5 (with Mark Bagley, 2011–2014) collected as Brilliant (hc, 168 pages, 2014, ISBN 0-7851-5914-2)
- Takio: The Complete Collection (tpb, 216 pages, DC's Jinxworld, 2019, ISBN 1-4012-9063-9) collects:
  - Takio (co-created by Bendis and his daughter Olivia, written by Bendis, art by Michael Avon Oeming, graphic novel, 96 pages, 2011, ISBN 0-7851-5326-8)
  - Takio #1–4 (co-created by Bendis and his daughter Olivia, written by Bendis, art by Michael Avon Oeming, 2012–2013) collected as Takio Volume 2 (hc, 96 pages, 2013, ISBN 0-7851-6553-3)
- The United States of Murder Inc. #1–6 (with Michael Avon Oeming, 2014–2015) collected as The United States of Murder Inc.: Truth (hc, 200 pages, 2015, ISBN 0-7851-9150-X; tpb, 2016, ISBN 1-302-90151-6)

== DC Comics ==
Titles published by DC Comics include:

- Batman:
  - The Batman Chronicles #21: "Citizen Wayne" (with Michael Gaydos, anthology, 2000)
    - Collected in Batman: The Greatest Stories Ever Told Volume 2 (tpb, 208 pages, 2007, ISBN 1-4012-1214-X)
    - Reprinted as a back-up feature in the first issue of Bendis and Gaydos' creator-owned series Pearl (2018)
  - DC 100-Page Comic Giant: Batman #3–14: "Universe" (with Nick Derington, anthology, 2018–2019)
    - Reprinted as a regular-sized 6-issue limited series under the title Batman: Universe (2019–2020)
    - Collected as Batman: Universe (hc, 176 pages, 2020, ISBN 1-4012-9484-7; tpb, 2021, ISBN 1-77950-583-3)
  - Detective Comics:
    - "I Know" (with Alex Maleev, co-feature in #1000, 2019) collected in Batman: 80 Years of the Bat Family (tpb, 400 pages, 2020, ISBN 1-77950-658-9)
    - "The Master Class" (with David Marquez, co-feature in #1027, 2020)
- Transmetropolitan: Filth of the City (two-page illustration for a text piece written by Warren Ellis, one-shot, Vertigo, 2001)
  - Collected in Transmetropolitan: Tales of Human Waste (tpb, 112 pages, 2004, ISBN 1-4012-0244-6)
  - Collected in Absolute Transmetropolitan Volume 2 (hc, 560 pages, 2016, ISBN 1-4012-6115-9)
- Superman:
  - The Man of Steel (hc, 184 pages, 2018, ISBN 1-4012-8348-9; tpb, 2019, ISBN 1-4012-9173-2) collects:
    - Action Comics #1000: "The Truth" (with Jim Lee, co-feature in the anthology-format anniversary issue, 2018)
    - DC Nation: "Superman in... Office Space" (with José Luis García-López, anthology one-shot, 2018)
    - The Man of Steel vol. 2 #1–6 (with Ivan Reis, Evan Shaner, Steve Rude, Ryan Sook, Kevin Maguire, Adam Hughes and Jason Fabok, 2018)
  - Superman vol. 5 (with Ivan Reis, Brandon Peterson, David Lafuente (#16), Kevin Maguire (#17, 22–24) and John Timms (#23–24), 2018–2021) collected as:
    - The Unity Saga: Phantom Earth (collects #1–6, hc, 168 pages, 2019, ISBN 1-4012-8819-7; tpb, 2019, ISBN 1-4012-9438-3)
    - The Unity Saga: The House of El (collects #7–15, hc, 240 pages, 2019, ISBN 1-4012-9439-1; tpb, 2020, ISBN 1-4012-9967-9)
    - The Truth Revealed (collects #16–19, hc, 192 pages, 2020, ISBN 1-4012-9969-5; tpb, 2021, ISBN 1-77950-571-X)
      - Includes the Superman: Heroes one-shot (co-written by Bendis, Matt Fraction and Greg Rucka, art by various artists, 2020)
      - Includes the Superman: Villains one-shot (co-written by Bendis, Matt Fraction and Jody Houser, art by various artists, 2020)
    - Mythological (collects #20–28, tpb, 248 pages, 2021, ISBN 1-77950-572-8)
  - Action Comics (with Patrick Gleason, Yanick Paquette (#1003), Ryan Sook, Steve Epting, Szymon Kudranski and John Romita, Jr., 2018–2021) collected as:
    - Invisible Mafia (collects #1001–1006, hc, 160 pages, 2019, ISBN 1-4012-8872-3; tpb, 2019, ISBN 1-4012-9478-2)
    - Leviathan Rising (collects #1007–1011, hc, 184 pages, 2019, ISBN 1-4012-9480-4; tpb, 2020, ISBN 1-77950-004-1)
      - Includes the Superman segment from the Superman: Leviathan Rising one-shot (written by Bendis, art by Yanick Paquette, 2019)
    - Leviathan Hunt (collects #1012–1016, hc, 144 pages, 2020, ISBN 1-77950-017-3; tpb, 2020, ISBN 1-77950-697-X)
    - Metropolis Burning (collects #1017–1021, tpb, 144 pages, 2021, ISBN 1-77950-698-8)
    - The House of Kent (collects #1022–1028, tpb, 184 pages, 2021, ISBN 1-77951-271-6)
- Event Leviathan (hc, 264 pages, 2020, ISBN 1-4012-9959-8; tpb, 2021, ISBN 1-77950-585-X) collects:
  - Superman: Leviathan Rising (with Yanick Paquette and other writers and artists, one-shot, 2019)
  - DC's Year of the Villain: "Chapter 2: Leviathan" (with Alex Maleev, anthology one-shot, 2019)
  - Event Leviathan #1–6 (with Alex Maleev, 2019)
- Legion of Super-Heroes:
  - Legion of Super-Heroes vol. 7 (with Ryan Sook, Travis Moore (#3), Mikel Janín (#4), Scott Godlewski (#5) and Stephen Byrne (#7), 2019–2021) collected as:
    - Millennium (collects #1–6 and the 2-issue prelude limited series Legion of Super-Heroes: Millennium, tpb, 240 pages, 2020, ISBN 1-4012-9577-0)
    - The Trial of the Legion (collects #7–12, tpb, 160 pages, 2021, ISBN 1-77950-563-9)
  - Future State: Legion of Super-Heroes #1–2 (with Riley Rossmo, 2021) collected in Future State: Superman (tpb, 456 pages, 2021, ISBN 1-77951-068-3)
- Event Leviathan: Checkmate (tpb, 192 pages, 2022, ISBN 1-77950-579-5) collects:
  - Leviathan Dawn (with Alex Maleev, one-shot, 2020)
  - Checkmate vol. 3 #1–6 (with Alex Maleev, 2021–2022)
    - The series was initially announced as a sequel to Event Leviathan, but the release ended up being postponed.
    - One year later, the series was resolicited as a tie-in to Bendis' run on Justice League under a new, shortened title.
- Justice League:
  - Infinite Frontier #0 (untitled 3-page story, with David Marquez, anthology, 2021) collected in Infinite Frontier (hc, 352 pages, 2022, ISBN 1-77951-424-7; tpb, 2023, ISBN 1-77951-998-2)
  - Justice League vol. 4 (with David Marquez, Steve Pugh (#64–65), Phil Hester, Scott Godlewski (#68) and Emanuela Lupacchino + Szymon Kudranski (#72–74), 2021–2022) collected as:
    - Prisms (collects #59–63, hc, 128 pages, 2022, ISBN 1-77951-437-9; tpb, 2023, ISBN 1-77952-004-2)
    - United Order (collects #64–68, hc, 128 pages, 2022, ISBN 1-77951-729-7; tpb, 2023, ISBN 1-77952-073-5)
    - Leagues of Chaos (collects #69–74 and Annual '22, hc, 248 pages, 2023, ISBN 1-77951-983-4; tpb, 2024, ISBN 1-77952-493-5)
  - Justice League vs. the Legion of Super-Heroes #1–6 (with Scott Godlewski, 2022) collected as Justice League vs. the Legion of Super-Heroes (tpb, 160 pages, 2022, ISBN 1-77951-741-6)

=== Jinxworld ===
Titles published under Bendis' own label for creator-owned works include:

- Pearl (with Michael Gaydos and Jessica Schrufer, 2018–2019) collected as:
  - Volume 1 (collects #1–6, tpb, 168 pages, 2019, ISBN 1-4012-9061-2)
  - Volume 2 (collects #7–12, tpb, 168 pages, 2019, ISBN 1-4012-9469-3)
- Cover #1–6 (with David Mack, 2018–2019) collected as Cover Volume 1 (tpb, 176 pages, 2019, ISBN 1-4012-9104-X)
- Scarlet vol. 2 #1–5 (with Alex Maleev, 2018–2019) collected as Scarlet Volume 1 (tpb, 144 pages, 2019, ISBN 1-4012-9062-0)
- United States vs. Murder Inc. #1–6 (with Michael Avon Oeming, 2018–2019) collected as United States vs. Murder Inc. (tpb, 160 pages, 2019, ISBN 1-4012-9150-3)
- Powers: The Best Ever (with Michael Avon Oeming — graphic novel incorporating #7–8 of the fourth Icon series with new material, 264 pages, 2020, ISBN 1-4012-9888-5)

=== Wonder Comics ===
Titles published under Wonder Comics ("pop-up" imprint curated by Bendis) include:

- Young Justice vol. 3 (with Patrick Gleason, John Timms and Scott Godlewski; issues #13–20 are co-written by Bendis and David F. Walker, 2019–2021) collected as:
  - Gemworld (collects #1–6, hc, 176 pages, 2019, ISBN 1-4012-9253-4; tpb, 2020, ISBN 1-4012-9997-0)
  - Lost in the Multiverse (collects #7–12, hc, 160 pages, 2020, ISBN 1-77950-038-6; tpb, 2020, ISBN 1-77950-457-8)
  - Warriors and Warlords (collects #13–20, tpb, 200 pages, 2021, ISBN 1-77950-458-6)
- Naomi (co-written by Bendis and David F. Walker, art by Jamal Campbell):
  - Naomi #1–6 (2019) collected as Naomi: Season One (hc, 160 pages, 2019, ISBN 1-4012-9495-2; tpb, 2022, ISBN 1-77951-639-8)
  - Naomi: Season Two #1–6 (2022) collected as Naomi: Season Two (hc, 144 pages, 2023, ISBN 1-77951-999-0; tpb, cancelled, ISBN 1-77952-482-X)
- Dial H for Hero #1–12 (written by Sam Humphries, drawn by Joe Quinones, Arist Deyn (#3) and Paulina Ganucheau (#8), 2019–2020)
- Wonder Twins #1–12 (written by Mark Russell, drawn by Stephen Byrne and Mike Norton (#8), 2019–2020)
- Amethyst vol. 3 #1–6 (written and drawn by Amy Reeder, 2020–2021)
- Jinny Hex Special (written by Magdalene Visaggio, drawn by Gleb Melnikov, 2021)

== Later independent work ==
Titles published by various American publishers in the later part of Bendis' career include:

- Love is Love (two-page illustration devised by Bendis and his daughter Olivia, art by Michael Avon Oeming, anthology graphic novel, 144 pages, IDW Publishing, 2016, ISBN 1-63140-939-5)
- Dark Horse:
  - Joy Operations (with Stephen Byrne):
    - Joy Operations #1–5 (2021–2022) collected as Joy Operations (tpb, 144 pages, 2022, ISBN 1-5067-2946-0)
    - Joy Operations 2 #1–5 (2024) collected as Joy Operations 2 (tpb, 112 pages, 2025, ISBN 1-5067-4065-0)
  - Pearl vol. 2 #1–6 (with Michael Gaydos, 2022) collected as Pearl Volume 3 (tpb, 144 pages, 2023, ISBN 1-5067-2934-7)
  - The Ones #1–4 (with Jacob Edgar, 2022–2023) collected as The Ones (tpb, 152 pages, 2023, ISBN 1-5067-2991-6)
  - Murder Inc.: Jagger Rose #1–6 (with Michael Avon Oeming, 2023) collected as Murder Inc.: Jagger Rose (tpb, 160 pages, 2024, ISBN 1-5067-3048-5)
  - Masterpiece #1–6 (with Alex Maleev, 2023–2024) collected as Masterpiece (tpb, 176 pages, 2024, ISBN 1-5067-3049-3)
- Phenomena (with André Lima Araújo, series of graphic novels published by Abrams ComicArts):
  - The Golden City of Eyes (hc, 144 pages, 2022, ISBN 1-4197-6169-2)
  - Matilde's Quest (hc, 144 pages, 2024, ISBN 1-4197-6171-4)
  - The Secret (hc, 144 pages, 2025, ISBN 1-4197-6173-0)
- Fortune and Glory: The Musical (with Bill Walko, webcomic published via Substack, 2023) collected in print as Fortune and Glory: The Musical (tpb, 144 pages, Dark Horse, 2025, ISBN 1-5067-3719-6)
