= Killing Castro =

Killing Castro may refer to:

- Castro's Beard, a play by Brian Stewart, renamed Killing Castro
- Killing Castro (comics), a 2015 graphic novel
- Killing Castro, a 2025 American biographical drama film
