= Fire (Image Comics) =

Publication information
- Publisher: Caliber Comics; Image Comics
- Schedule: Monthly
- Format: Limited series
- Genre: Crime
- Publication date: January – February 1993
- No. of issues: 2

Creative team
- Created by: Brian Michael Bendis
- Written by: Brian Michael Bendis
- Artist(s): Brian Michael Bendis
- Letterer(s): Brian Michael Bendis

Collected editions
- Fire: ISBN 1-58240-071-7

Fire was originally a two-issue creator-owned comic book mini-series written and drawn by Brian Michael Bendis and published by Caliber Comics. It was later republished as a single volume by Image Comics.

Fire was among Bendis's first works to draw critical acclaim. Its success gave him a much wider audience and helped pave the way for A.K.A. Goldfish and Jinx.

== Plot synopsis ==
The story, a spy thriller, is centered on a young Jewish-American man named Benjamin "Ben" Furst, who is initially introduced as a college student studying political science. After passing several tests, including a fake mugging, he is recruited by a beautiful young woman named D. D. into the Central Intelligence Agency and told that he is going to be the first agent of Project Fire (hence the title of the comic), an experiment to test whether training agents out of ordinary citizens can be successful.

Ben passes and becomes an agent under the command of Linda Dagger. He is placed in England to pose as a journalist named Jake Donaldson, and he is dispatched from time-to-time to set up assassinations in places around the world ranging from Japan to Brazil. He gradually becomes disillusioned with his lifestyle and job, and he begins to suspect that he is being set up himself.

One day, D. D., who had previously always treated him coldly, has sex with him. When Ben wakes up the next day, he is attacked by contract killers; Ben kills them and then breaks into CIA headquarters. He discovers that Project Fire is not a new experimental project, but rather something that has been going on for years; each such Project Fire agent is killed once the agent's superiors decide he has become a liability. Ben attempts to escape with the information, but he is captured by Linda Dagger.

Dagger sends D. D. to kill Ben, but Ben kills D. D. instead and escapes. He tries to send the information he has to a journalist to publicize, but before he can, at the end of the comic, Dagger finds him again and informs him that he either works for her or dies.

== Collected editions ==
The series has been collected as a trade paperback:

- Project Fire Complete (114 pages, Transfuzion Publishing, 1994, ISBN 0-941613-61-5)
- Fire (120 pages, Image Comics, 2001, ISBN 1-58240-071-7)

== Film adaptation ==
Universal Studios have optioned the film, with Zac Efron penciled in to play the lead.
