= Fortune and Glory =

2001 Graphic Novel published in three installments

- Cover to the first trade edition.

Publication information
- Publisher: Oni Press
- Schedule: Bi-Monthly
- Format: Limited series
- Genre: Autobiographical comics
- Publication date: December 1999 – April 2000
- No. of issues: 3

Creative team
- Created by: Brian Michael Bendis
- Written by: Brian Michael Bendis
- Artist(s): Brian Michael Bendis
- Letterer(s): Brian Michael Bendis
- Colorist(s): Matt Wilson (hardcover only)
- Editor(s): Jamie S. Rich; K.C. McCrory Wise

Collected editions
- Softcover: ISBN 1-929998-06-6
- Hardcover: ISBN 0-7851-4309-2

Fortune and Glory is a three-issue American comic book limited series by Brian Michael Bendis. It is the story of the author's attempts to break into Hollywood by writing screenplays for his hardboiled comics (such as Jinx, A.K.A. Goldfish, and Torso).

In 2001, the series was nominated for Eisner Awards in three categories.

== Collected editions ==
The series has been collected into an individual volume:

- Fortune and Glory (152 pages, softcover, Oni Press, August 2000, ISBN 1-929998-06-6)
- Fortune And Glory: A True Hollywood Comic Book Story Deluxe Anniversary Edition (160 pages, Marvel Comics, June 2010, ISBN 0-7851-4309-2)

== Awards ==
The comic book received a number of award nominations:

- 2001:
  - Eisner Award for "Best Limited Series"
  - Eisner Award for "Best Humor Publication"
  - Eisner Award for "Best Writer" for Bendis' work on Fortune & Glory (as well as Powers and Ultimate Spider-Man)
