= Scarlet (Icon Comics) =

Comic book series

- The cover for Scarlet #1

Publication information
- Publisher: Icon Comics; Jinxworld
- Schedule: Bimonthly (irregular)
- Format: Ongoing series
- Publication date: July 2010 – March 2019
- No. of issues: (vol. 1): 10 (vol. 2): 5

Creative team
- Created by: Brian Michael Bendis; Alex Maleev
- Written by: Brian Michael Bendis
- Artist: Alex Maleev
- Letterer(s): Chris Eliopoulos (vol. 1); Joshua Reed (vol. 2)
- Colorist: Alex Maleev
- Editor(s): C. B. Cebulski (vol. 1); Michael McCalister (vol. 2)

Scarlet is a creator-owned comic book series written by Brian Michael Bendis and illustrated by Alex Maleev. It was initially published by Marvel Comics under the company's Icon imprint and later published by DC Comics under the company's Jinxworld imprint.

The series is about a young woman named Scarlet Rue from Portland who rebels against a corrupt society and ends up starting a new American revolution in the process. The series often breaks the fourth wall in that the protagonist talks to the reader of the comic.

Bendis and Maleev previously collaborated on Daredevil, Spider-Woman, and Halo: Uprising. Scarlet was published on an irregular schedule.

== Collected editions ==
Title	Release date	Publisher	Format	Pages
Book 1	July 20, 2011	Icon Comics	Hardcover	184
Book 2	September 13, 2016	Icon Comics	Hardcover	176
Volume One	April 30, 2019	Jinxworld	Trade paperback	144

== Television series ==
In 2016, Cinemax began developing a television series based on the comic.
