= The United States of Murder Inc. =

Comic Book Series

The United States of Murder Inc. is a creator-owned comic book series written by Brian Michael Bendis originally published under Marvel Comics' Icon imprint. The title is illustrated by Michael Avon Oeming.

== Television adaptation ==
In 2024, Bendis and Oeming agreed to executive produce the television series for Amazon Prime Video with I'm a Virgo writer/producer Tze Chun as the showrunner.
