= Torso (Image Comics) =

Late-90s graphic novel about crime

- Cover of the first issue

Publication information
- Publisher: Image Comics
- Schedule: Irregular
- Format: Limited series
- Genre: Crime
- Publication date: October 1998 – September 1999
- No. of issues: 6

Creative team
- Created by: Brian Michael Bendis; Marc Andreyko
- Written by: Brian Michael Bendis; Marc Andreyko
- Artist: Brian Michael Bendis
- Letterer: Brian Michael Bendis

Collected editions
- Torso: ISBN 1-58240-697-9

Torso is a true crime limited series graphic novel written by Brian Michael Bendis and Marc Andreyko, with art and lettering by Brian Michael Bendis. It is based on the true story of the Cleveland Torso Murderer, and the efforts of the famous lawman Eliot Ness and his band of "Unknowns" to capture him.

Bendis was initially inspired to write the novel after reading the files about the murders. As a Cleveland native, Bendis wrote the novel to pay homage to his hometown. Together with co-writer Andreyko, they crafted the comic with various historical photographs and clippings from the era. After its release, the graphic novel was critically well received by the comic book community and elevated Bendis' career in the industry. The graphic novel was originally published by Image Comics and later reprinted under Marvel's Icon imprint. Since then, various attempts to adapt the novel into a film have been proposed.

== Publication history ==
Torso was originally published as a six-issue limited series by Image Comics. Bendis envisioned the comic as a historical true story which he turned into a graphic novel. Torso was written during Bendis' time as a struggling writer in his hometown Cleveland. His inspiration came while working as a cartoonist in the Cleveland Plain Dealer, where his editor gave him access to the Cleveland Torso Murders files. The files contained all of the visual evidences and testimonies, such as photographs, interviews and newspaper excerpts for Bendis to create the novel. His particular inspiration was that of a picture of a coroner examining a dismembered leg with a magnifying glass, which he described as "the opposite of CSI." Besides the archives, Bendis and Mark also took information from Eliot Ness' own written interviews. He summarized their work during an interview:

Torso was one of the biggest challenges of my career. Taking on the responsibility of a true story but abstracting it in graphic novel form is a very large mountain to climb. When Marc Andreyko brought up the idea he was thinking of it only in movie terms, but I became obsessed with the idea of how to do the story as a graphic novel. Once you delve into that level of reality and research on one project, it becomes the standard to which every other project, whether it is Scarlet or even Spiderman, must rise to.

In creating the atmosphere of the comic, Marc used historical photographs and documents combined with his black-and-white artwork to tell a unique noir-like story. Bendis and Andreyko presented their story in a straightforward cinematic fashion, with the occasional use of silent and repeated panels and sparse dialogue to create tension. The use of photography and clippings in the comic is also focused upon, with Marc's intention of presenting it like a film comic, creating a tone of realism. Bendis also provided the art and lettering, as well as his trademark "sharp and contrast" dialogue he would later use in his future projects.

== Synopsis ==
Torso tells the story of the real life "Torso Murderer", a serial killer who was active during 1934 to 1938. He received his nickname because he left only the torsos of his victims. Without fingerprints or dental records, these victims were very difficult to identify in a time before DNA testing. The investigator on the case was Eliot Ness, Cleveland Safety Director and former head of the Untouchables.

== Collected editions ==
The series was collected in a trade paperback, Torso: A True Crime Graphic Novel (ISBN 1582406979), in 2000, and also published by Image. Marvel Comics reformatted and reprinted the comic book in its Icon imprint in March 2012. In June 2022, Dark Horse republished the collected series as Torso: A True Crime Graphic Novel.

== Reception and awards ==
After its release, Torso was met with critical acclaim from both critics and consumers alike. The graphic novel won the 1999 Eisner Award for "Comic Book Excellence, Talent Deserving of Wider Recognition". Torso was nominated for an International Horror Guild award for best graphic story and for 3 International Eagle Awards. The graphic novel elevated both Bendis and Marc's careers in the comic book industry, which soon led Bendis being discovered and recruited by Marvel as well as solidifying his reputation as a crime writer. Comic Book Resources called it "one of the great crime comics of the late 20th century".

Today, the graphic novel is considered one of the best of its genre. ComicsAlliance listed the graphic novel in its "8 of the Best Noir Comics", calling it "an engaging and — unsurprisingly — genuinely creepy story". Top Tenz ranked in at #4 in its list "Top 10 Crime Comics", describing it as a "stunning and chilling examination of one of America's great unsolved crime sprees". Jesse Schedeen from IGN ranked Torso at #5 in her "9 Great Murder Mystery Comics", stating that it "used these real-world events to weave a great mystery with a dramatic climax".

== Film ==
On January 11, 2006, Variety reported that director David Fincher would be directing Torso for Paramount Pictures with Bill Mechanic, Don Murphy, Todd McFarlane and Terry Fitzgerald producing and Ehren Kruger writing the screenplay. In a September 2009 unedited episode of Fanboy Radio, Bendis confirmed the Torso film had been canceled by Miramax, and the rights had reverted to Bendis. The story of the failed attempt to make the film was told in Bendis's autobiographical graphic novel, Fortune and Glory.

In 2013, new plans for an adaptation were greenlit, with David Lowery hired to write and direct the film. Bendis said that while the project has had its ups and downs over the last 15 years, he's never lost belief in its cinematic potential.

It's a cool true story that very little people know of. You think you know the story of Elliot Ness? You don't. You know the story of serial killers? You don't. And that's how I kept the faith.

In March 2017, director Paul Greengrass was hired to direct and produce Ness for Paramount Pictures with producers John Davis, Greg Goodman and John Fox producing from Davis Entertainment with David Engel from Circle of Confusion. Screenwriter Brian Helgeland was set to write the script. On May 8, 2018, it was announced that Paramount had abandoned the film, and would let the rights revert back to Bendis and Andreyko. On October 20, 2022, Bendis revealed that Corin Hardy was attached to direct the film adaptation entitled Torso. In December 2025, Netflix picked up the movie rights with Roy Lee, Zach Cregger, Nick Antosca, and Alex Hedlund as producers.
