= Caliber Comics =

Comic book publisher

- Industry: Comics
- Founded: 1989
- Founder: Gary Reed
- Headquarters: Wayne County, Michigan
- Key people: Gary Reed, Jim Pruett
- Parent: Stabur Corporation
- Subsidiaries: Gauntlet; Iconografix; New Worlds; Stabur; Tapestry Comics
- Website: Official website

Caliber Comics or Caliber Press is an American comic book publisher founded in 1989 by Gary Reed. Featuring primarily creator-owned comics, Caliber published over 1,300 comics in the decade following its inception and is ranked as one of America's leading independent publishers. Caliber ceased publishing in 2000, but resumed operations in 2015, and continued after Reed died in 2016.

== History ==
=== Beginnings ===
Gary Reed, who previously owned a chain of bookstores, began publishing with the release of two titles acquired from Arrow Comics—Deadworld and The Realm. Other initial launches included Caliber Presents, featuring the work of Vince Locke, Mark Bloodworth, Tim Vigil, James O'Barr, and Guy Davis; the first issue of Baker Street, co-created by Reed and Guy Davis; and the initial appearance of O’Barr’s The Crow.

=== Expansion ===
Reed arranged with "Pocket Classics", a series of illustrated books similar in design to Classics Illustrated, to be released to the direct market via Caliber Press. Over forty titles were distributed. The interest in literary works continued for Caliber when in 1991 the new imprint Tome Press was launched. Tome featured historical and biographical material in addition to literature. Over 65 different Tome Press titles would be released on subjects as diverse as the Russian Revolution, The Alamo, Amelia Earhart, El Cid, Jack London stories, reprints of classic art print series, and dozens of others.

After its initial launch, Caliber expanded by bringing in new creators and projects. Jim Calafiore was first published with his graphic novella, Progeny. In Grafik Muzik, Mike Allred introduced his Madman character, Kevin VanHook's Frost series which was the storyline for the film released in 2002, Ted Slampyak's Jazz Age Chronicles, Philip Hester's Fringe, Stuart Immonen's Playground, John Bergin's Ashes, and other titles such as Go-Man, Northguard, Varcel's Vixens, and more.

In the early 1990s, Caliber launched three new imprints, Gauntlet and Iconografix. Gauntlet was an action-based line whose leading titles were U.N. Force, Berzerker (featuring work from Rob Liefeld and Angel Medina), Patrick Zircher's Samurai Seven, and Serpent Rising (based on the stage play). Iconografix dealt with more obscure and cutting-edge material that included humor comics as well as comics often referred to as the "slice of life." Included here were the first issues of Ed Brubaker's Lowlife, Meatcake from Dame Darcy, Bound & Gagged from Michael Aushenker, and a number of projects from Dave Cooper, Jason Lutes, and Matt Howarth.

Caliber had ventured into licensed comics with their early release of Moontrap, the science fiction film starring Star Trek's Walter Koenig, and the production of a comic for Troma Films called Frostbiter: Wrath of the Wendigo; but it was the full-color adaptation of The Rocky Horror Picture Show, written and drawn by Kevin VanHook that proved the most successful.

Another licensed property was Mechanoid Invasion, a 1981 RPG from Palladium Books made into a 3-book comic called The Mechanoids beginning in Spring 1991. Another comic property affiliated with Caliber called Justice Machine had also been adapted into a Heroes Unlimited sourcebook by Palladium. This was based on the original Noble Comics version by Gustovich in 1981, while Caliber distributed the New Justice Machine sequel by Ellis from 1989.

The expansion of Caliber continued with projects including Michael Lark's Airwaves, Silencers from Mark Askwith and R. G. Taylor, and Negative Burn, the anthology title that would run for 50 issues and was picked up by Desperado Publishing.

=== Stabur merger and further expansion ===
In late 1993, Caliber merged with Paul Burke's Stabur Corporation/Stabur Press. Reed became president of Stabur as well as staying on with Caliber. (Stabur had been founded in 1983, and was known for publishing monographs of Mad magazine cartoonists like Jack Davis and Mort Drucker.) At the time of the merger, Stabur and Burke were involved in starting up a new toy company with Spawn creator Todd McFarlane. Reed was named vice president of McFarlane Toys while still running Stabur and Caliber. Reed would stay with McFarlane Toys until May 1996.

Writer Jim Pruett was hired to take over some of the editorial duties of Caliber, which began to produce special comics for Wal-Mart, including the series Big Bang Comics (which later would have a long run at Image Comics), Stormquest, and a number of literary adaptations, including a version of Frankenstein. Caliber also produced some records and a specialty magazine, ARC, for distribution outside comics.

Caliber expanded in the mid-1990s with titles such as David W. Mack's Kabuki, Brian Bendis' A.K.A. Goldfish and Jinx, Mark Ricketts' Nowheresville, Mike Carey and Michael Gaydos on Inferno, and in 1995, Caliber launched the sub-imprint of New Worlds. New Worlds' titles were loosely connected, and included Raven Chronicles, Helsing, Seeker, Saint Germaine, Red Diaries, Black Mist, and others. Although not an actual shared universe, the settings and characters could cross over with each other and often did.

In the mid-1990s, Caliber's Stabur imprint published two advocacy comics written by Joyce Brabner — Activists! (originally commissioned by the Fellowship of Reconciliation) and Animal Rights Comics (published as a benefit for People for the Ethical Treatment of Animals; 2 issues).

As Caliber expanded, more editorial staff was hired to handle the growing line of comics. Moebius Comics launched and fan favorites Mr. Monster and Maze Agency returned. Caliber handled the distribution of Howard Feltner's Amazing Comics Group, which featured the work of Mike Deodato. Brian Lumley's Necroscope and Whitley Strieber's Communion series were signed on for comic releases. Jon Sable from Mike Grell was announced but never came out. Caliber also started a new imprint in 1997, Tapestry Comics, that featured an "all ages" approach.

=== Decline and demise ===
As the overall comic market declined with the consolidation of the distribution system, Caliber slowly cut back on the number of titles. Caliber found some success of producing comics that appealed outside the usual comics market with some of the Tome Press titles including the Sherlock Holmes Reader, which had the majority of its sales outside the traditional comic stores.

The demise of Caliber can be attributed primarily to the problems associated with the Spawn PowerCardz game. Caliber had invested heavily in time and money to launch the collectible card game and had great potential with purchase orders. However, the printer of the card game was running behind in production and outsourced the collation of the game to another printer who didn't understand the random assortment of the cards. When the game appeared with improper collation, the purchase orders, which exceeded over two million dollars, were cancelled. Although a lawsuit was filed and Caliber won, by the time the judgment came, it was too late. In addition, the printer declared bankruptcy and Caliber was left only with portions of the unusable product.

In 2000, Caliber released the last of its titles, and Gary Reed moved on to concentrate on teaching college biology and freelance writing. Many of Caliber's top titles continued on with new publishers, including Baker Street, Deadworld, Saint Germaine, Kilroy Is Here, Negative Burn, Raven Chronicles, and Red Diaries. Reed had been reviving many of the Caliber titles with reprints of collections and all new series, initially from Image Comics, then from Desperado Publishing and Transfuzion Publishing. Deadworld continued to be printed in new volumes via Desperado but now under the IDW banner.

=== Relaunch and death of Gary Reed ===
In 2015, Gary Reed undertook a relaunch of Caliber, and solicited orders in the summer of 2016 for several new and reprint publications; however, he died suddenly in October 2016. Caliber has continued publishing, as of 2018, with graphic novels and comics such as Weirdsdale, Knights of the Skull, Nightlinger, The Shepherd, and Infinite.

== Selected titles ==
- A.K.A. Goldfish
- Alan Moore's Songbook
- Ashes
- Baker Street
- Beck & Caul
- Big Bang Comics
- Black Mist
- Boston Bombers
- Brian Lumley's Necroscope
- Caliber Presents
- Cavewoman: Rain
- The Crow
- Daemonstorm
- Deadworld
- Death Sin
- Dicks
- Disciples
- Fire
- Golgothika
- Guns of Shar-Pei(1991), #1–3
- The Hanged Man (1998), #1–2 (reprints the "Mazeworld" stories from 2000 AD)
- Helsing
- Inferno
- Jinx
- Kabuki
- Kaos Moon
- Killing Castro
- Kilroy Is Here
- Kingdom of the Wicked
- Legendlore
- Level X (1996), #1–2 (collected in 2017 as Level X: Machine of Dreams)
- Lori Lovecraft
- The Lost
- Magus
- The Marquis
- Maze Agency
- Mike Deodato Comics
- Moebius Comics
- Mr. Monster
- Nature of the Beast
- Negative Burn (1993–1997), #1–50
- New Worlds Anthology (1996), #1–6
- Nowheresville
  - Nowheresville (1995), #1
  - Death by Starlight (1995), #1–4
  - The History of Cool (1997), #1
- Oz
  - Oz (1994–1997), #0–20
  - Oz Special 1: Scarecrow (1995), #1
  - Oz Special 2: Lion (1995), #1
  - Oz Special 3: Tinman (1995), #1
  - Oz Special 4: Freedom Fighters (1995), #1
  - Romance in Rags (1996), #1–3
  - Straw and Sorcery (1997), #1–3
- Protheus (1996), #1–2
- Raven Chronicles (1995–1997), #1–14
- Red Diaries
- Renfield
- The Realm
  - v1 (1989–1991), #14–21
  - v2 (1993–1995), #1–13
- The Rocky Horror Picture Show (1990–1991), #1–3
- Saint Germaine
- Scarlet in Gaslight (1996), TPB (reprints #1–4 of the Eternity Comics series)
- Seeker
- The Searchers (1996), #1–4
- The Searchers: Apostle of Mercy (1997), #1–2
- Sherlock Holmes
- Ship of Fools (1996), #1–2
- Silencers (1991), #1–4
- The Silent Invasion (1996), #1–6 (reprints the first half of the Renegade Press series)
- Silverfawn (1989), #1 (a The Realm character)
- Sinergy: A Journey Through Hell (2015), #1–5
- Spawn PowerCardz
- Startling Crime Illustrated (1991), #1
- Stormquest (1994–1995), #1–6
- Strange Attractors: Moon Fever (1997), #1–2 (continues from the RetroGrafix series Strange Attractors #1–15)
- Sudden Gravity
- The Sussex Vampire (1996), #1
- Swords of Shar-Pei
- Technopolis
- Untouchables
- The War of the Worlds (1996), #1–5 (collected in 2002 by Arrow Press as The War of the Worlds: Haven and the Hellweed)
- Whitley Streiber's Beyond Communion
- The Worlds of H.P. Lovecraft (continued under Tome imprint)
  - Arthur Jermyn (1993), #1
  - Dagon (1993), #1–2
  - The Music of Erich Zaan (1993), #1
  - The Picture in the House (1993), #1
  - The Statement of Randolph Carter (1996), #1

== Imprints' titles (selected) ==
=== Amazing Comics ===
- Angel Heat: The Ninth Order (1997), #1
- Dangerous Secrets (1997), #1
- The Experimentals (1997), #1

=== Tome Press ===
- The Dance of Death (1992), #1
- Dante's Inferno (1992), #1–2
- Dinosaurs: An Illustrated Guide (1991), #1
- Erewhon (1992), #1
- Hunting of the Shark (1992)
- Jack London
  - Chinago and Other Stories (1991)
  - Koolau the Leper (1991)
  - A Piece of Steak (1991)
- Jack the Ripper (1998), #1
- The Man Who Would Be King (1993), #1
- Medieval Tales: Murder of Thomas Becket
- Pre-Raphaelite Persuasion
- Professor Challenger: The Poisoned Belt (1997)
- Sherlock Holmes: Dr. Jekyll & Mr. Holmes (1998)
- Siege of The Alamo
- Song of the Cid (1991), #1–2
- Suppressed! (1991), #1
- True Spy Stories (1991), #1
- Troy (1997), #1–2
- The Worlds of H.P. Lovecraft
  - The Alchemist (1997), #1
  - The Lurking Fear (1997), #1
  - The Tomb (1997), #1
  - Beyond the Walls of Sleep (1998), #1
- Zulunation (1991), #1–3

=== New Worlds ===
- Black Mist
- Helsing
- Raven Chronicles
- The Red Diaries
- Saint Germaine
- Seeker

=== Gauntlet ===
- Berzerker
- Samurai Seven
- Serpent Rising
- U.N. Force (1993), #1–5

=== Iconografix ===
- Bound & Gagged
- Lowlife
- Meatcake
- Very Vicky

=== Tapestry Press ===
- BoonDoggle
- Dreamwalker (1996–1997), #1–4 (from Dreamwalker Press; see Avatar Press)
- Explorers v2 (1996–1997), #1–3 (from Explorer Press)
- The Hoon
- Pakkins' Land
- Patty Cake (1996–1997), #1–2
- A Patty Cake Christmas (1996), #1
- Shades of Gray Comics and Stories
- Tapestry Anthology (1997), #1
- Terror Tots
- Trollords v4 (1997), #1–2 (from Apple Press)
