= Jinx (Image Comics) =

Series by Brian Michael Bendis

Paperback cover of the Image series (1997).

Jinx is a comic book series published first by Caliber Comics and then Image Comics, written and drawn by Brian Michael Bendis.

== Synopsis ==
Jinx is a prequel to the same author's A.K.A. Goldfish, telling the story of Jinx, a female bounty hunter and her relationship with David Goldfish, con-artist and wanted felon. Jinx has also crossed over with the detective series Sam and Twitch. There she helps them track down a bounty hunter that has become mentally deranged.

The story is a loose adaptation of Sergio Leone's The Good, the Bad and the Ugly, but resets it in the modern crime noir genre.

== Models ==
- D.D. Byrne as Jinx
- John Skrtic as Goldfish
- Brian Michael Bendis as Columbia
- Mike Sangiacomo as Office Mike
- David Mack as Dead Mug Number 1
- James D. Hudnall as Dead Mug Number 2
- Ceray Doss as Becky
- Jared Bendis as Ricky Ricketts
- Michael Johnson as Money B
- Dan Berman as Street Loser 1
- Frisco as Street Loser 2
- Marc Andreyko as Reverend Peter
- Curtis as Apollo
- Keith Konajcik as Motormouth Mug
- Tom Zjaba as Silent Mug
- Jimmy Williams as Danny
- Michael Hahn as Young Danny
- Tia Rachten as Young Jinx
- Kevin Snorteland as Rob
- Genevieve Halton as the chain smokin' foul mouthed crack whore
- Kyra Kester as Lauren Bacall

== Adaptations ==
In 2004, Charlize Theron signed on to produce and star in a film adapted from Jinx for Universal Pictures. On February 27, 2024, Bendis agreed to executive produce the television series for Amazon Prime Video with Michael Chabon and Ayelet Waldman as the showrunners.
