= Takio =

Comic book series

- The cover the original Takio graphic novel

Publication information
- Publisher: Icon Comics
- Format: Limited series
- Publication date: March 2011

Creative team
- Created by: Brian Michael Bendis, Michael Avon Oeming
- Written by: Brian Michael Bendis
- Artist: Michael Avon Oeming

Takio is a creator-owned comic book series written by Brian Michael Bendis under Marvel Comics' Icon imprint. The title is illustrated by Michael Avon Oeming.

== Plot ==
The series is about two bickering siblings living in an adoptive family: Taki and her younger sister Olivia. When the two girls accidentally gain powers, they decide to become superheroes.

== Release ==
The series debuted as an original graphic novel in 2011. Due to its success, Bendis continued the story in a sequel miniseries in 2012. Bendis stated that his plan was that the title would be continued in yearly miniseries, which would be collected into individual graphic novels; no such miniseries were produced after 2012.
