= Alex Maleev =

Bulgarian comic book illustrator (born 1971)

Alex Maleev Алекс Малеев
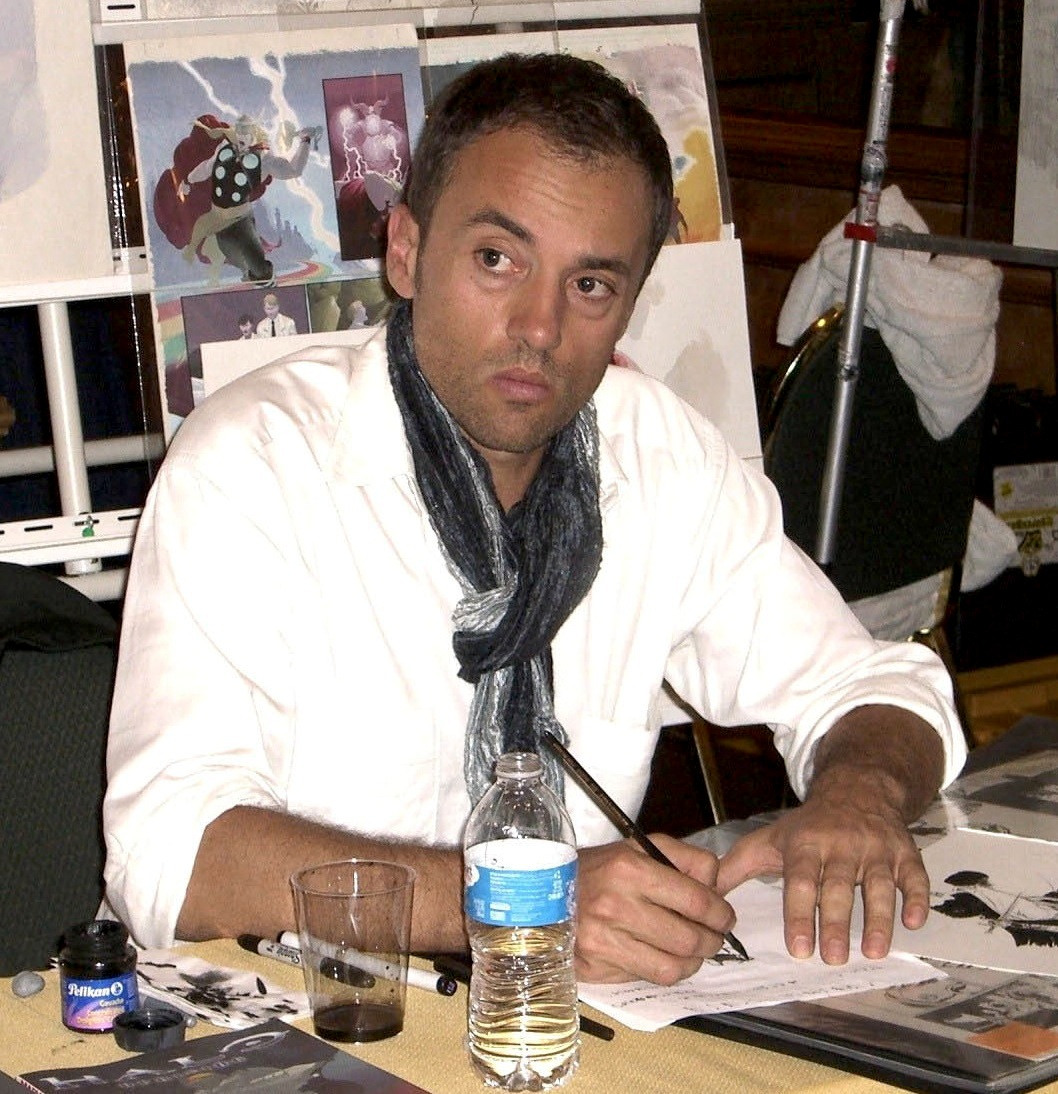
- Maleev at the 2010 Big Apple Convention in Manhattan
- Born: Bulgaria
- Areas: Illustrator; painter
- Notable works: Daredevil (vol. 2); Spider-Woman; Freedom Fighters (cover art)
- Awards: 1996 Russ Manning Most Promising Newcomer Award; 2003 Eisner Award for Best Serialized Story

Alex Maleev (Bulgarian: Алекс Малеев) is a Bulgarian comic book illustrator, best known for the Marvel Comics' series Daredevil (vol. 2) with frequent collaborator Brian Michael Bendis. Steven S. DeKnight has said that Maleev's art was a template for the Daredevil television series.

== Career ==
Coming from a fine arts background, Maleev made his first foray into comics in Bulgaria for Godan (Годън in Bulgarian) and Carthel of Dead published in Riko magazine since 1991 and 1992, respectively. Upon arriving in the United States in 1995, he enrolled at The Kubert School where, within a month, he was promoted from first to second year status at the suggestion of instructor Alec Stevens. Maleev left the school in early 1996, already securing professional comics work on James O'Barr's The Crow (Dead Time and Flesh and Blood) and subsequently storyboarding the "Lost in Space" film at Continuity Associates before entering a successful run at DC Comics on Batman: No Man's Land. In his comics, he sometimes references his Bulgarian origins. For example in Aliens vs. Predator alien eggs are stored in the cellar of a typical Bulgarian church.

He first teamed with Bendis on Todd McFarlane's Sam and Twitch series in 2000-2001 before they were recruited for Daredevil. In 2006, Maleev finished his run with Bendis in Daredevil and planned a collaboration with the writer on a new ongoing Spider-Woman series. Bendis and Maleev collaborated once again on the much delayed four part Halo: Uprising miniseries from Marvel Comics. Bendis and Maleev relaunched Moon Knight in 2011 with volume 4, and are currently working on the creator owned comic Scarlet, under the Marvel imprint Icon Comics.

Maleev also did art for the "New Avengers: Illuminati" special, the January 2007 issue of the New Avengers, issue #26 and the one-shots, Civil War: The Confession and Secret Invasion: Dark Reign. He also did the artwork for the character Sylar on the TV show Heroes. Often blending photographic and digital effects with drawing in his comics art, as with his work on Daredevil, as well as watercolors and gouache, as on Spider-Woman.

== Works ==
=== Dark Horse Comics ===
- Hellboy: Weird Tales #3 ("Still Born", script and art, with co-author Matt Hollingsworth, 2003, collected in Volume 1, 2003, ISBN 978-1-56971-622-9)
- Hellboy & the B.P.R.D. #1-#5 (limited series) (with Mike Mignola and John Arcudi, 2014—2015)

=== Image Comics ===
- Sam and Twitch #15-24 (with Brian Michael Bendis, 2000–2001)

=== Marvel Comics ===
- Civil War: The Confession (with Brian Michael Bendis, one-shot, 2007)
- Daredevil (vol.2) #26-50, 56-81, 100 (with Brian Michael Bendis, 2001–2006, 2007)
- Halo: Uprising (with Brian Michael Bendis, 4-issue mini-series, 2007–2009, hardcover, May 2009, ISBN 0-7851-3647-9)
- Mighty Avengers #12-13 (with Brian Michael Bendis, 2008)
- New Avengers #26, #50 (with Brian Michael Bendis)
- New Avengers: Illuminati (with Brian Michael Bendis, one-shot, 2003)
- Secret Avengers #20 (with Warren Ellis, 2012)
- Secret Invasion: Dark Reign (with Brian Michael Bendis, one-shot, 2009)
- Spider-Woman (with Brian Michael Bendis, 2009–2010)
- Moon Knight #1-12 (with Brian Michael Bendis, 2011)
- Empire of the Dead: Act One (with George A. Romero, 2014)
- International Iron Man #1-7 (with Brian Michael Bendis, 2016)
- Infamous Iron Man #1-12 (with Brian Michael Bendis, 2016-2017)

=== DC Comics ===
- Batman Chronicles #12 ("Trapped" with Chris Renaud, 1998)
- Detective Comics #723, 730 (with Chuck Dixon and Bob Gale, 1998–99)
- Batman: No Man's Land #1 (with Bob Gale, 1999)
- Shadow of the Bat #83 (with Bob Gale, 1999)
- Batman #563 (with Bob Gale, 1999)
- Superman vs. Predator (with David Michelinie, three-issue mini-series, 2000)
- Batman (vol. 2) #19-20 (backup stories with Scott Snyder and James Tynion, 2013)
- Batman: The Dark Knight (vol. 2) #22-25 (with Gregg Hurwitz, 2013)
- Event Leviathan #1-6 (with Brian Michael Bendis, 2019)

=== Icon (Marvel Imprint), later Jinxworld (DC Imprint) ===
- Scarlet #1-ongoing (with Brian Michael Bendis, 2010–present)

=== Other editors ===
- The Crow: Dead Time (with James O'Barr/John Wagner, 3-issue mini-series, Kitchen Sink Press, 1996)
- The Crow: Flesh and Blood (with James O'Barr/James Vance, 3-issue mini-series, Kitchen Sink Press, 1996)

=== Video games ===
- Freedom Fighters cover art
