= Halo: Uprising =

American comic book limited series

- Promotional poster for the limited series depicting the Master Chief against a backdrop of alien Covenant vessels. The art was also used as the first issue's cover and the hardcover collected edition (art by Alex Maleev)

Publication information
- Publisher: Marvel Comics
- Schedule: Irregular
- Format: Limited series
- Genre: Military science fiction
- Publication date: October 2007 – June 2009
- No. of issues: 4
- Main character: Master Chief

Creative team
- Written by: Brian Michael Bendis
- Artist: Alex Maleev
- Letterer: Chris Eliopoulos
- Colorist: José Villarrubia
- Editor: Ruwan Jayatilleke

Collected editions
- Hardcover: ISBN 0-7851-3647-9

Halo: Uprising is a four-issue American comic book limited series set in the Halo universe. The series was written by Brian Michael Bendis, illustrated by Alex Maleev, and published by Marvel Comics. Uprising tells a story set between the ending of the 2004 video game Halo 2 and the beginning of its sequel, Halo 3, as Earth is under attack by a collective of alien races known as the Covenant. The series was intended to be released and concluded before Halo 3 shipped on September 25, 2007, but the final issue did not appear until April 2009.

The series was brought together by Ruwan Jayatilleke, Marvel's Vice President of Development. He attained the license to publish Halo comics, including the single-volume The Halo Graphic Novel, in 2005. The graphic novel's critical and commercial success prompted Marvel to announce a new Halo limited series in 2006 with Jayatilleke serving as the series' editor. Bendis, a long-time Halo fan, was excited about adding to the franchise story.

Reception to the series was lukewarm. The series' artistic style was generally praised. However, the lack of Master Chief-focused action and character development—as well as the delays in publishing—led to average reviews. The series was commercially successful and appeared in the top slot of The New York Times Graphic Books bestsellers list.

== Publication history ==
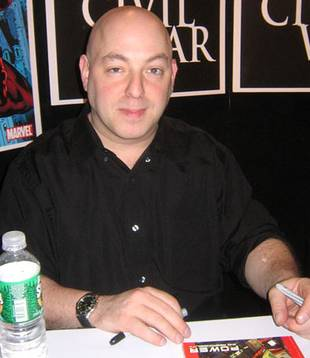
Brian Michael Bendis, writer for Halo: Uprising

Marvel Vice President of Development Ruwan Jayatilleke contacted game developer Bungie about extending the Halo franchise to comics. Jayatilleke noted that Bungie's dedication to creating a believable world compelling to both hardcore and casual fans made the series "an attractive fit" for Marvel. In 2005, Marvel learned that Bungie had already created an original graphic novel, entitled The Halo Graphic Novel, but needed a publisher and distributor. Interested, Brian Michael Bendis and Jayatilleke visited Bungie to take up the offer of publishing the Halo Graphic Novel as well as to discuss the possibility of a tie-in comic book series.

The Halo Graphic Novel proved to be a critical and commercial success; the comic debuted at the number two position on the Diamond Comic Distributors' sales charts and more than 100,000 copies were published. Marvel Comics and Bungie announced the first Halo limited comic series, Halo: Uprising, at the 2006 San Diego Comic-Con.

Brian Michael Bendis, writer for the series, said in an interview he was "honored" to add to the Halo lore. He noted that the graphic novel brought "humanity and perspective" to the franchise, something not easily imparted through the games. Bendis described himself as a longtime player of Halo and had "done [his] Halo homework", reading and playing everything Halo. Bendis stated that Bungie was open to the Marvel team exploring lesser-known elements of the Halo universe or even bringing up new ideas, as opposed to sticking to a script or set of preplanned ideas from Bungie or Microsoft. The Philadelphia Daily News suggested that a Halo comic book would attract readers who had never picked up a comic book before. Bendis said that drawing casual gamers to the comics was a major goal for the series. While using established characters meant that Bendis had to cooperate with Bungie and Microsoft, he said he did not feel it was a restriction. "You can get pretty bloated and sloppy with total autonomy all the time." The Bungie team allowed Bendis to explore lesser known areas of the Halo story, which he enjoyed. Writing the dialogue for the Master Chief, who is faceless and normally silent during gameplay, was a challenge; Bendis scrapped much of the drafted dialogue to allow Maleev's work to define the character.

Originally, Halo: Uprising's entire four-issue series was to be published before the September 25, 2007, release of Halo 3. Bendis suggested that the series might be delayed unexpectedly due to the close cooperation between Marvel and Bungie. For unspecified reasons, the release of all issues of Halo: Uprising were pushed back. Issue #1's original date of August 15, 2007, was pushed back a week to August 22. Issue #2's original date of August 29 was pushed back and released on November 21. Issue #3 was originally slated for a September 2007 release but was pushed to a final release date of nearly a year late in August 2008. The constant revisions of the date became a running forum joke at the fan site Halo.Bungie.Org. Issue #4 also saw multiple delays, pushed from a scheduled October 31, 2007 release to March 4 and then March 18, 2009. Claude Errera of Halo.Bungie.Org noted that, given the series' track record and the fact that the issue's release had been moved more than a dozen times by that time, its appearance in March would be unlikely. In announcing two new Halo comic series from Marvel in February 2009, Jayatilleke informed IGN that the final issue was in the process of being colored. The final release date for the issue was April 15. The series was collected into a single volume released in May 2009 (ISBN 0-7851-3647-9). The collected hardcover features a variety of bonus art and "making of" materials.

== Plot ==
Uprising's story begins after the events of Halo 2, in which the alien collective known as the Covenant discovers the location of Earth and begins a full-scale invasion of their enemy's homeworld. The supersoldier Master Chief is stowed away aboard an ancient Forerunner ship. On a course set for Earth, he is overwhelmed by a Covenant strike force and rendered unconscious. In the next scene, Colonel James Ackerson is being tortured by Covenant forces on Mars, to whom he betrays the existence of something called "The Key of Osanalan." Ackerson admits the Key is located in Cleveland, Ohio. In Cleveland, the narrative follows the point of view of a hotel concierge named Ruwan as the city falls under attack by Covenant forces. In the mayhem he meets a woman named Myras Tyla. Tyla remains calm even as Ruwan edges towards all-out panic. The pair are captured and with other residents herded into a sports stadium. The Covenant declare that the humans must give up the location of the Key to save their lives; Tyla is confused, but Ruwan states he knows exactly what it is.

On board the Forerunner ship, the Master Chief is captured and interrogated by Covenant forces, but manages to escape using a concealed weapon. On Earth, Ruwan and Tyla escape detection by the Covenant and appropriate a vehicle in an effort to escape. Ruwan reveals that the Key is in fact a fictional object that he and his brother James Ackerson made up as children; James told the Covenant about the Key in order to prevent the outright destruction of Cleveland. After fighting Covenant forces, Ruwan and Tyla are rescued by marines and leave the city. The Master Chief attempts to kill the Covenant's leader, Prophet of Truth, but is discovered as he takes aim; Truth escapes as the Chief is left to kill the Prophet's guards and find a way off the ship. Learning that there is no way to change the Forerunner ship's destination, the Chief jumps to Earth using a piece of the vessel as a heat shield, directly leading into Halo 3.

After informing the UNSC about the true nature of the Key, Ruwan volunteers to "give" the Key to the Covenant. He is captured and brought aboard a Covenant ship. While the Covenant believe he is to be rescued due to a tracker embedded in him, Ruwan reveals he is actually a target. A coilgun takes aim at his position and destroys the ship. Upon learning that the Key is a fake, the Brutes on Mars behead Ackerson. In a relief camp, Tyla writes a song about Ruwan.

== Reception ==
Halo: Uprising was a commercial success. The first issue sold out within 24 hours, leading Marvel to reissue the installment. The collected hardcover edition was the best-selling hardcover graphic book for the week ending June 13, according to The New York Times.

Reception to the miniseries varied. Reviewer Kevin Powers for Comics Bulletin and Richard George of IGN praised the action sequences and Maleev's visuals. The balance between action and story was also positively noted; Powers said that the first two sequences of the opening issue "masterfully capture the spirit of the game". On the other hand, IGN's Jesse Schedeen, reviewing the second issue, stated the series' appeal was mostly superficial: "try as they might to replicate [Halo's] visceral moments, Bendis and Maleev just can't replicate the same feeling on the printed page."

Reviewers criticized the lack of Master Chief as a main character, similarly to the response to The Halo Graphic Novel; Schedeen said that "Master Chief is barely a guest star in his own book", and that he was reduced to blasting aliens for much of the series. Schedeen felt that there was a lack of connections between the Ruwan plot and the Master Chief's adventures, which was never satisfactorily resolved. The comic's focus on Ruwan and Myra's subplot was also seen as a major fault: Comics Bulletin's Geoff Collins, in a review of the second issue, said that "as a comic book fan I'm interested [in Ruwan and Myra], but the Halo fans I know could care less about them [sic]. And the story in this issue centers around them." Schedeen wrote that he was surprised to find that he only began to care about them in the final issue. The many delays in publishing were a frequent point of frustration as well. Schedeen summed up his reviews by saying that he was hopeful the production teams behind the upcoming Halo books "will learn from the mistakes made here and craft stories that can consistently capture what makes Halo fun. At the very least, let's hope we don't have to wait a year between issues anymore".
