= Spider-Woman (comic book) =

Spider-Woman (comic book) refers to a series of comic book series about the Marvel Comics characters Spider-Woman:

- Marvel Masterworks: Spider-Woman, a 50-issue series about Jessica Drew published from 1978 to 1983
- Spider-Woman: Origin, a 2005–2006 series about Drew by Brian Michael Bendis and Brian Reed
- Spider-Woman: Agent of S.W.O.R.D., a 2009–2010 series about Drew by Bendis and Alex Maleev
- Spider-Gwen, a 2014–2018 series about Spider-Woman (Gwen Stacy) by Jason Latour and Robbi Rodriguez
- Spider-Woman: Shifting Gears, a 2015–2017 series about Drew by Dennis Hopeless
- Spider-Women, a 2016 crossover event between Spider-Gwen, Spider-Woman, and Silk by Robbie Thompson
- Spider-Woman: Bad Blood, a 2020–2022 series about Drew by Karla Pacheco
- Spider-Woman: Gang War, a 2024 series about Drew written by Steve Foxe
