= Killing Castro (comics) =

Graphic novel

Killing Castro is a graphic novel published in 2015 by Caliber Comics written by Jason Ciaccia and illustrated by Aaron Norhanian.

The various bizarre incidents and names in the graphic novel are taken from documents released by the CIA. The book was self-published under the title The Sinister Truth: MkUltra by Ciaccia and Norhanian in 2009 and received positive reviews. It was named one of the best graphic novels of 2010 by R.C.Baker in the Village Voice. It was included in the syllabus of Brooklyn College’s Core Curriculum in 2011.

== Plot ==
As described on Caliber Comics’ website, slightly edited:

In 1963 Cuba is a Communist threat to the U.S. only 90 miles from Miami. The CIA sends three elite operatives to Havana. Their mission, codenamed “Operation Good Times,” was to humiliate Fidel during a live television broadcast by dosing him with LSD and making his beard fall out.

One of the agents, "Bob", bears the permanent scars of MKULTRA. Bob was kept inside a sensory deprivation tank for so long that he can hardly contain himself from blowing his cover to the first pretty lady he sees at a bar.

Back home, Doctor Sidney Gottlieb, the mad mastermind behind MKULTRA, is attempting to regain control of Bob by using the latest technological advancements at his disposal: the satellite, radio waves, and bioactive implants created for such missions placed inside the agents’ brains.

The book portrays many of the failed, and often humorous, attempts to infiltrate Castro's inner circle to assassinate or publicly humiliate him.
