= Meatcake =

Dessert made with meat

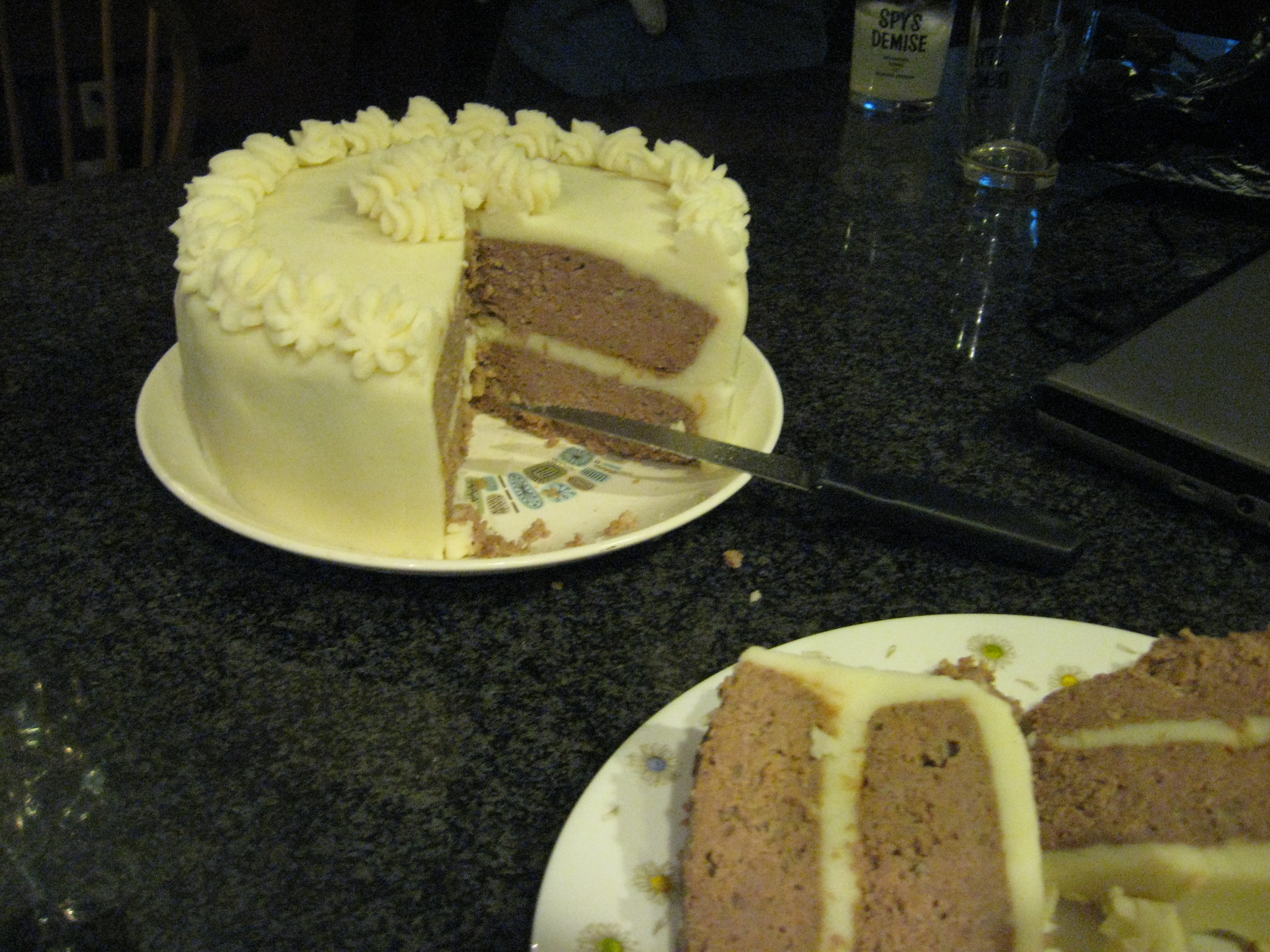
Meatcake

Meatcake, or meatloaf cake, is a cake or other dessert look-alike that is made with meat in a meatloaf style, and not a pastry. Layers of meatloaf, baked in cake pans, are commonly "frosted" with mashed potatoes in classic layer cake fashion.

The term is used in a sketch by comedian George Carlin, in which he describes finding an unidentifiable item in the refrigerator. "Could be meat, could be cake.... It looks like... meatcake!"

== See also ==
- Meatloaf
- Salisbury steak
