= Icon Comics =

Imprint of Marvel Comics

- Industry: Publishing
- Predecessor: Epic Comics
- Founded: 2004
- Defunct: 2017
- Products: Comic books
- Owner: Marvel Entertainment (The Walt Disney Company)
- Parent: Marvel Comics
- Website: Official website

Icon Comics was an imprint of Marvel Comics for creator-owned titles, designed to keep select "A-list" creators producing for Marvel rather than seeing them take creator-owned work to other publishers.

== History ==
Icon Comics was launched in 2004 with Michael Avon Oeming and Brian Michael Bendis' superhero/detective series Powers and David Mack's Kabuki moving to the imprint, both from Image Comics. In June 2005 the imprint's third title J. Michael Straczynski's Dream Police was launched, followed in September by The Book of Lost Souls, also from Straczynski. Criminal by Ed Brubaker and Sean Phillips is an ongoing crime comic also published by Icon.

Mark Millar has described the deal with Icon in relation to his Kick-Ass series:

The creative team get all the rights and you do all the promotion yourself. You could end up out of pocket because some of the team get paid upfront under these deals whereas Johnny and I don't take a page rate. But it was a calculated risk as we both have pretty good reps and so anything over, say, 25,000 would basically cover our Marvel page rates.

== Titles ==
Following the move of Brian Michael Bendis (as well as all of his comics) to DC Comics in 2017, the Icon imprint has been dormant:

- Brilliant by writer Brian Michael Bendis and artist Mark Bagley
- Casanova by writer Matt Fraction and artists Gabriel Bá and Fábio Moon, moved back to Image Comics in 2014
- Criminal by writer Ed Brubaker and artist Sean Phillips, moved to Image Comics in 2016
- Dream Logic, by writer-artist David Mack
- Dream Police by writer J. Michael Straczynski and artist Sid Kotian, moved to Image Comics in 2014
- Empress by writer Mark Millar and artist Stuart Immonen
- Hit-Girl by writer Mark Millar and artist John Romita Jr., moved to Image Comics in 2018
- Incognito by writer Ed Brubaker and artist Sean Phillips
- Jack Kirby's Galactic Bounty Hunters
- Kabuki by writer-artist David Mack, moved to Dark Horse Comics in 2014
- Kick-Ass by writer Mark Millar and artist John Romita Jr., moved to Image Comics in 2018
- Kick-Ass 2 by writer Mark Millar and artist John Romita Jr., moved to Image Comics in 2018
- Kick-Ass 3 by writer Mark Millar and artist John Romita Jr., moved to Image Comics in 2018
- Men of Wrath by writer Jason Aaron and artist Ron Garney
- Nemesis by writer Mark Millar and artist Steve McNiven
- Painkiller Jane by writer Jimmy Palmiotti and artist Joe Quesada
- Powers by writer Brian Michael Bendis and artist Michael Avon Oeming, moved to Jinxworld in 2018
- Scarlet by writer Brian Michael Bendis and artist Alex Maleev, moved to Jinxworld in 2018
- The Book of Lost Souls by writer J. Michael Straczynski and artist Colleen Doran
- The Secret Service by writer Mark Millar and artist Dave Gibbons, moved to Image Comics in 2017
- Supercrooks by writer Mark Millar and artist Leinil Francis Yu
- Superior by writer Mark Millar and artist Leinil Francis Yu
- Takio by writer Brian Michael Bendis and artist Michael Avon Oeming
- The United States of Murder Inc. by writer Brian Michael Bendis and artist Michael Avon Oeming

== See also ==
- Epic Comics, an earlier Marvel imprint for creator-owned works
