= Brian Michael Bendis =

American comic book writer and artist (born 1967)

- Bendis at Rose City Comic Con in 2026
- Born: August 18, 1967 (age 59) Cleveland, Ohio, U.S.
- Areas: Writer, Artist
- Notable works: Jinx; Torso; Powers; Ultimate Spider-Man; Alias; Daredevil; New Avengers; House of M Secret Invasion; Siege; All-New X-Men; Age of Ultron; Civil War II
- Awards: Five Eisner Awards including: Best New Series (2001); Best Writer (2002, 2003); Inkpot Award
- Spouse: Alisa
- Children: 4

Brian Michael Bendis (/ˈbɛndɪs/; born August 18, 1967) is an American comic book writer and artist.

Starting with crime and noir comics, Bendis eventually moved to mainstream superhero work. While at Marvel Comics, Bendis worked with Bill Jemas and Mark Millar as the writer on the first book of the Ultimate Marvel imprint, Ultimate Spider-Man, which debuted in 2000. He relaunched the Avengers franchise with New Avengers in 2004, wrote the Marvel storylines "Avengers Disassembled" (2004–2005), "Secret War" (2004–2005), "House of M" (2005), "Secret Invasion" (2008), "Siege" (2010) and "Age of Ultron" (2013), and co-created the characters Riri Williams, Miles Morales, and Jessica Jones.

Bendis has won five Eisner Awards for both his creator-owned work and his work on various Marvel Comics books.

Though he has cited comic book writers such as Frank Miller and Alan Moore, Bendis' writing influences are less rooted in comics, drawing on the work of David Mamet, Richard Price, and Aaron Sorkin, whose dialogue, Bendis said, was "the best in any medium."

In addition to writing comics, Bendis has worked in television, video games and film. He has also taught courses on graphic novels at The University of Oregon and Portland State University. In 2014, Bendis wrote Words for Pictures: The Art and Business of Writing Comics and Graphic Novels, a book about comics published by Random House.

== Early life ==
Brian Michael Bendis was born on August 18, 1967, in Cleveland, Ohio to a Jewish-American family. Bendis grew up in University Heights where, despite rebelling against a religious upbringing, he attended the Hebrew Academy of Cleveland, a private, modern Orthodox religious school for boys. He decided he wanted to be a comic book industry professional when he was 13, working on his own comics, including a Punisher versus Captain America story that he revised several times. A fan of Marvel Comics in particular, he emulated idols such as George Pérez, John Romita Sr., John Romita, Jr., Jack Kirby, Klaus Janson and Frank Miller. He later discovered crime comics by Jim Steranko and José Muñoz, which he traced back via Jim Thompson's work to the source novels of both Thompson and Dashiell Hammett, which helped cement his love for crime stories. These, in turn, led him to discover the documentary Visions of Light, which taught him the visual "rules" of film noir, an important influence on him creatively.

While in high school, he submitted a "Creative Writing assignment", a novelization of Chris Claremont's X-Men and the Starjammers story, which gained him an A+ grade for imagination and inventiveness. At 19, Bendis began attending the Cleveland Institute of Art, while working at a downtown comic book store where he eventually sold some of his early work. Between the ages of 20 and 25, he sent in a large number of submissions to comics companies, although he ultimately abandoned this approach to breaking into the industry, considering it too much of a "lottery."

== Comics career ==
=== Caliber Comics ===
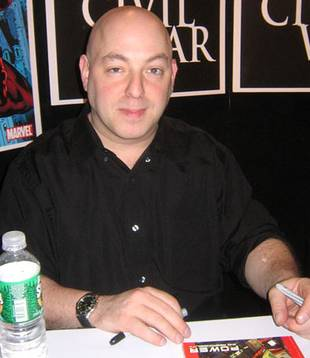
Bendis in February 2006

Best known as a writer, Bendis started out as an artist, doing work for local magazines and newspapers, including caricature work. He worked at The Plain Dealer as an illustrator. Although he did not enjoy caricature work, it paid well and funded his interest in writing crime fiction for graphic novels. He eventually moved into both writing and illustrating his work, before he began producing work for Caliber Comics, including Spunky Todd.

Through Caliber, he met many of his longtime friends and collaborators within the comics industry, including Mike Oeming, Dave Mack and Marc Andreyko, and began the first in a series of independent noir fiction crime comics when he published two issues of Fire in 1993 and five issues of A.K.A. Goldfish in 1994 with Caliber. In 1995 he illustrated Flaxen from a script by James Hudnall, with David Mack providing inks to the story featuring former Playboy Playmate Susie Owens as mascot of the Golden Apple Comics chain [of comic shops] in Los Angeles.

Bendis's best-known early work, Jinx, starring the titular bounty hunter in a crime noir version of the Sergio Leone film The Good, the Bad and the Ugly, began publication in 1996, and ran for seven issues from Caliber.

He characterizes much of this period of his professional life in terms of working as "a graphic artist for almost twelve years", undergoing a period within that of "nine years" living as a stereotypical 'starving artist'.

=== Image Comics and Oni Comics ===
In 1996–1997, Bendis moved from Caliber to Image Comics, where Jinx and his other previous crime comics were published by Image's Shadowline arm in trade paperback. At Image, he also produced five more issues of Jinx.

Impressed with A.K.A. Goldfish, Image founder Todd McFarlane sought out Bendis, which led to his writing Sam and Twitch. Although set in the Spawn universe, Bendis approached Sam and Twitch primarily as a crime comic. He wrote Sam and Twitch for twenty issues, as well as most of the first ten issues of Hellspawn, another Spawn spin-off title. This non-creator-owned work allowed him to, in the words of Rich Kriener in The Comics Journal, "[add] the responsibility of caretaker to his resume, in that he would answer to a vested owner about developing a property as a tangible asset with the future in mind," rather than only working on his own characters under his own terms.

In 1998, Bendis co-wrote and illustrated the Eliot Ness-starring Torso with Marc Andreyko, again for Image, and in 2000 he produced three issues of the autobiographical Fortune and Glory for Oni Comics.

That same year saw the debut of the superhero police/noir detective series Powers, co-created with and drawn by Michael Avon Oeming and published by Image. Powers won major comics industry awards, including Harvey, Eisner, and Eagle Awards.

=== Marvel Comics ===
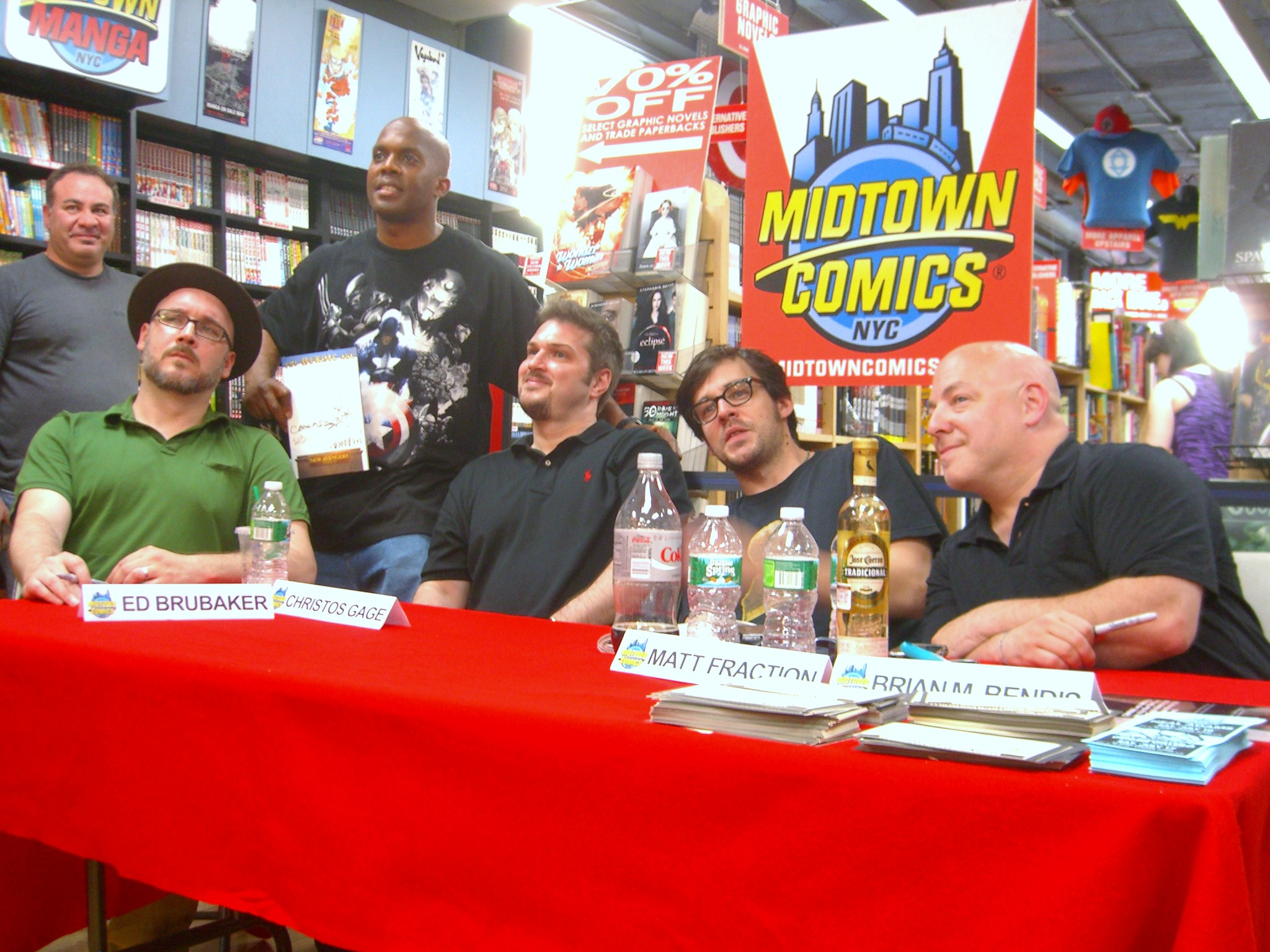
Bendis (far right) at a 2010 signing in Manhattan with fellow Marvel writers (seated left to right) Ed Brubaker, Christos Gage and Matt Fraction

Around the time Bendis began Sam and Twitch, his friend David Mack began working for Joe Quesada's Marvel Knights imprint, which Bendis was a fan of. Based on Bendis' work on Jinx, Quesada invited him to pitch ideas for Marvel Knights, which included a planned, but ultimately unproduced, Nick Fury story.

Marvel Comics President Bill Jemas, on the recommendation of Quesada, hired Bendis to write Ultimate Spider-Man, which debuted in 2000, and was targeted at the new generation of readers. Bendis adapted the 11-page origin story of Spider-Man from 1962's Amazing Fantasy #15 into a seven issues story arc, with Peter Parker becoming the titular hero after the fifth issue, making the book a bestseller, often surpassing in sales those of the mainstream Marvel universe title, The Amazing Spider-Man. The Bendis/Bagley partnership of 111 consecutive issues made their partnership one of the longest in American comic book history, and the longest run by a Marvel creative team, beating out Stan Lee and Jack Kirby on Fantastic Four. Bendis subsequently wrote other books in the Ultimate line, including Ultimate Marvel Team-Up, which Bendis pitched to Marvel as a follow-up to Ultimate Spider-Man, as well as Ultimate Fantastic Four, Ultimate X-Men, Ultimate Origins, Ultimate Six, the first three issues of Ultimate Power, and the Ultimate Comics: Doomsday metaseries. In 2011, Bendis and artist Sara Pichelli created the Miles Morales character as the new version of the Ultimate Spider-Man. Bendis wrote every issue of Ultimate Spider-Man, including its second iteration, Ultimate Comics: Spider-Man.

Quesada offered Bendis the writing duties on Daredevil, which he took over in 2001, writing most of the subsequent 55 issues until 2006, collaborating mostly with artist Alex Maleev. As a major Daredevil author, Bendis's name is one of the names used for boxers mentioned by a corrupt boxing manager in the 2003 Daredevil movie. Also in 2001, Bendis helped launch Marvel's non-Comics Code-approved, adult MAX imprint with Alias, featuring former superhero Jessica Jones operating as a private investigator. The series ran for 28 issues before many of the characters moved to Bendis's mainstream Marvel Universe series The Pulse. In 2004 Powers moved from Image to Marvel's creator-owned imprint Icon, where it was relaunched as Powers Vol. 2 alongside another ex-Image series, David Mack's Kabuki.

Also in 2004, Bendis oversaw the closing issues of The Avengers as part of the crossover storyline "Avengers Disassembled". This led directly to the Bendis-helmed relaunch of one version of the eponymous team in the pages of New Avengers. Bendis's work on this storyline included the death of Avenger Hawkeye, which proved controversial. In 2005, with artist Olivier Coipel, Bendis wrote the New Avengers / X-Men crossover, "House of M", which would retroactively be considered the second act of a three-act super-event beginning with "Avengers Disassembled" and culminating in the Bendis-written 2008 storyline "Secret Invasion". Bendis also wrote the storyline "Secret War", which was published between 2004 and 2005. The series, which was not connected to the 1984 miniseries Secret Wars, served as a prelude to Secret Invasion. After Marvel's 2006 "Civil War" storyline, Bendis helmed another Avengers revival, launching Mighty Avengers with Frank Cho in 2007.

Post-"Secret Invasion", Bendis left Mighty Avengers with issue #20 and wrote Secret Invasion: Dark Reign, a one-shot that preceded another ongoing Avengers series, Dark Avengers. In 2009, Bendis and former Daredevil collaborator Maleev launched the long-delayed Spider-Woman, following up on her role in the "Secret Invasion" storyline. Spider-Woman was the first comic book to be offered simultaneously on the Internet as a "motion comic" and in comic stores in print form.

Bendis re-teamed with Olivier Coipel for the 2009 crossover series "Siege", which brought the "Dark Reign" storyline to a close, and with-it, Dark Avengers. Springboarding out of Siege, Bendis relaunched both Avengers and New Avengers as part of the "Heroic Age".

Also in 2010, Bendis launched Scarlet through Icon Comics, his first new creator-owned comic book in over a decade, re-teaming once again with Maleev. In February 2011, Icon released the all-ages graphic novel, Takio by Bendis and his Powers collaborator Mike Oeming, and in mid-2011 a maxiseries called Brilliant with artist Bagley. Bendis's other 2011 projects included a new Moon Knight series with Maleev, which concluded with issue 12. In 2012, in conjunction with Marvel Studios' feature film The Avengers, Bendis began writing a new Avengers comic, Avengers Assemble. Bendis wrote the first eight issues of Avengers Assemble, a series that premiered in March 2012 that featured a new incarnation of the Zodiac, as well as the return of the Guardians of the Galaxy, which teamed with the Avengers against Thanos.

Bendis concluded his stint on Avengers and New Avengers in 2012 with the "End Times" arc. His final issue of Avengers, released September 2012, was a "jam issue", featuring splash pages by Marvel artists including Walt Simonson, Jim Cheung, and Leinil Yu.

Following Marvel's "Marvel NOW!" relaunch of its titles, Bendis took on writing duties on All New X-Men, which saw the return of the original 1960s X-Men to the present, Uncanny X-Men, whose focus shifts to Cyclops' team of X-Men going rogue after the events of "Avengers Vs. X-Men", and Guardians of the Galaxy, picking up where his Avengers Assemble run left off.

Bendis wrote the "Age of Ultron" crossover storyline, which included an eponymous 10-issue miniseries, that was published between March and June 2013. Issue 10 saw the introduction of the Neil Gaiman character Angela into the Marvel Universe.

On July 22, 2014, Random House published Bendis's instruction book on comics, Words for Pictures: The Art and Business of Writing Comics and Graphic Novels. The day after that book's publication, CBR.com published an interview in which Bendis talked about the course on writing Graphic Novels he had taught for the past few years, initially at Portland State University, and beginning with the Fall 2013 semester, at the University of Oregon. His decision to teach came at the urging of Dark Horse Comics editor Diana Schutz. Among the works he employs as teaching guides are the works of Scott McCloud and Will Eisner.

=== DC Comics ===
Bendis discussing comics and black culture with David F. Walker in 2017

In November 2017, Bendis announced via Twitter that he would be working exclusively with DC Comics. His DC debut was in Action Comics #1000 (June 2018). Ivan Reis drew the first issue of Bendis's The Man of Steel limited series, and collaborated with Bendis on the relaunched ongoing Superman series in 2018. Bendis took over writing Action Comics following its 1,000th issue.

On December 21, 2021, Bendis announced that he was developing an adult animated Legion of Super-Heroes series for the streaming service HBO Max. The show is set to be based on his run of the comic book series and is not connected to the original animated series.

== Work in other media ==
In addition to his primary work in comics, Bendis has produced written work in several other media, such as video games, TV and film.

Bendis was the co-executive producer and series-pilot writer for Mainframe Entertainment's 2003 animated Spider-Man show, Spider-Man: The New Animated Series that aired on MTV and YTV, which features a college-aged Peter Parker, and was written to tie-into the then-unreleased 2002 film Spider-Man. The pilot episode that Bendis wrote became the third episode aired. His dismay at being credited for something written by someone else, and the multitude of corporate and legal departments involved in the animation process soured him on the show.

Bendis was one of the writers on the Ultimate Spider-Man animated series, which debuted in 2012.

He was credited as a developer and wrote several episodes for the TV adaptation of his comic, Powers, which starred Sharlto Copley and ran on PlayStation Network for two seasons from 2015 to 2016.

Bendis's video game work includes Activision's Ultimate Spider-Man video game, which Bendis wrote. He also wrote an Avengers game, which was never released. He was also a writer of Marvel's MMO, Marvel Heroes.

His film work includes the screenplay adaptation of A.K.A. Goldfish for Miramax, and the screenplay adaptation of Jinx for Universal Pictures. In 2014, he wrote the plot of the Disney Infinity 2.0 video game.

In 2024, Bendis signed a first-look deal with Amazon Prime Video to develop television shows based on Jinx, Murder Inc., and Pearl.

In 2025, Bendis served as a consulting producer on the Disney+ series Daredevil: Born Again.

In 2013, he was named on IGN's list of "The Best Tweeters in Comics", in part for his frequent Twitter posts highlighting the work of other creators.

== Writing style ==
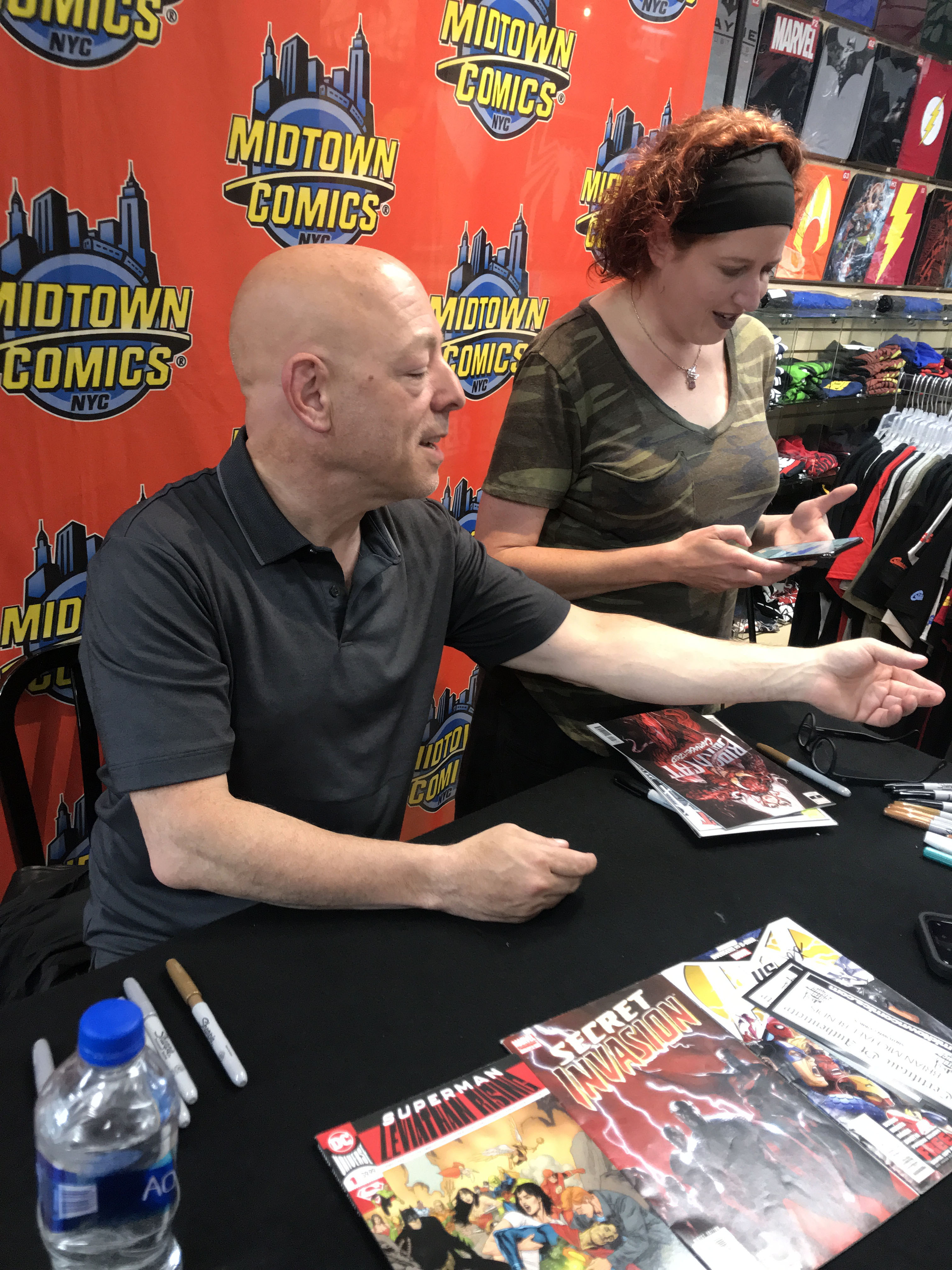
Bendis and his wife Alisa at Midtown Comics in Manhattan

When creating characters, Bendis says that he always begins with someone he knows and builds upon that inspiration, allowing the character to eventually evolve naturally. His depiction of Aunt May in Ultimate Spider-Man, for example, strongly resembles his mother.

== Personal life ==
Bendis met his wife Alisa in 1995 through the Cleveland chapter of the Hillel Foundation, where Alisa worked and Bendis was a staff illustrator. The two were married within a year. Alisa Bendis manages JINXWORLD, the company through which Bendis produces his creator-owned and licensed comics work. They have four children, of which three are daughters. Bendis's oldest daughter, Olivia, is his biological daughter. He and his wife adopted their two younger daughters, one of whom is African-American, and the other of whom is Ethiopian. Their names are Tabatha (adopted in June 2011) and Sabrina. Bendis mentioned in a July 2013 post on his Tumblr account that they had a newborn son, who is named London.

== Awards ==
- 1999 Eisner Award for Talent Deserving of Wider Recognition
- 2001 Eisner Award for Best New Series (for Powers with Michael Avon Oeming)
- 2002 Eisner Award for Best Writer (for Powers, Alias, Daredevil and Ultimate Spider-Man)
- 2003 Eisner Award for Best Writer (for Powers, Alias, Daredevil and Ultimate Spider-Man)
- 2003 Eisner Award for Best Continuing Series (for Daredevil with Alex Maleev)
- 2000 Cleveland Press "Excellence in Journalism" Award
- 2000 Wizard Magazine Best Writer of the Year
- 2001 Wizard Magazine Best Writer of the Year
- 2002 Wizard Magazine Best Writer of the Year
- 2003 Wizard Magazine Best Writer of the Year
- 2002 Comics Buyer's Guide Best Writer of the Year
- 2003 Comics Buyer's Guide Best Writer of the Year
- 2004 Comics Buyer's Guide Best Writer of the Year
- 2005 E3's People's Choice Award for Activision's Ultimate Spider-Man
- 2010 Inkpot Award

=== Nominations ===
- 2001 Eisner Award for Best Limited Series (for Fortune & Glory)
- 2001 Eisner Award for Best Humor Publication (for Fortune & Glory)
- 2001 Eisner Award for Best Writer (for Powers, Fortune & Glory and Ultimate Spider-Man)
- 2003 Eisner Award for Best Serialized Story (with Alex Maleev for "Out"; Daredevil #32–37)

== Screenwriting credits ==
=== Television ===
- Spider-Man: The New Animated Series
  - The Party
- Ultimate Spider-Man (TV series)
  - Freaky
  - For Your Eye Only
  - Not a Toy
  - The Incredible Spider-Hulk
  - Guardians of the Galaxy
  - The Return of the Guardians of the Galaxy
- Powers (American TV series)
  - Level 13
  - Funeral of the Century
  - Slain Dragons

=== Video games ===
- Ultimate Spider-Man (video game) (writer)
- Marvel Heroes (video game) (writer)
- Disney Infinity 2.0 (writer)

Preceded by David Mack	Daredevil writer 2001	Succeeded by Bob Gale
Preceded by Larry Hama	Elektra writer 2001–2002	Succeeded by Greg Rucka
Preceded by Bob Gale	Daredevil writer 2001–2006	Succeeded by Ed Brubaker
Preceded by Mark Millar	Ultimate X-Men writer 2003–2004	Succeeded by Brian K. Vaughan
Preceded by n/a	Ultimate Fantastic Four writer 2004 (with Mark Millar)	Succeeded by Warren Ellis
Preceded by Chuck Austen	The Avengers writer 2004–2005, 2010–2012	Succeeded by Jonathan Hickman
Preceded by n/a	New Avengers writer 2005–2012	Succeeded by Jonathan Hickman
Preceded by n/a	The Mighty Avengers writer 2007–2009	Succeeded by Dan Slott
Preceded by n/a	Dark Avengers writer 2009–2010	Succeeded by Jeff Parker
Preceded by John Byrne	Spider-Woman writer 2009–2010	Succeeded by Dennis Hopeless
Preceded by Gregg Hurwitz (Vengeance of Moon Knight)	Moon Knight writer 2011–2012	Succeeded by Warren Ellis
Preceded by n/a	Avengers Assemble writer 2012	Succeeded by Kelly Sue DeConnick
Preceded by n/a	All-New X-Men writer 2013–2015	Succeeded by Dennis Hopeless
Preceded by Kieron Gillen	Uncanny X-Men writer 2013–2015	Succeeded by Cullen Bunn
Preceded by Dan Abnett; Andy Lanning	Guardians of the Galaxy writer 2013–2017	Succeeded by Gerry Duggan
Preceded by Tom Taylor (Superior Iron Man)	Iron Man writer 2015–2018	Succeeded by Dan Slott (Tony Stark: Iron Man)
Preceded by Cullen Bunn (Fearless Defenders)	The Defenders writer 2017–2018	Succeeded by Al Ewing
Preceded by Peter J. Tomasi; Patrick Gleason	Superman writer 2018–2021	Succeeded by Phillip Kennedy Johnson
Preceded by Dan Jurgens	Action Comics writer 2018–2021	Succeeded by Phillip Kennedy Johnson
Preceded by Peter David	Young Justice writer 2019–2021 (with David F. Walker in 2020–2021)	Succeeded by n/a
Preceded by Paul Levitz	Legion of Super-Heroes writer 2019–2021	Succeeded by Joshua Williamson
Preceded by Joshua Williamson	Justice League writer 2021–present	Succeeded by current
Preceded by Bruce Jones	Checkmate writer 2021–2022	Succeeded by n/a
