= David W. Mack =

American comic book artist and writer (born 1972)

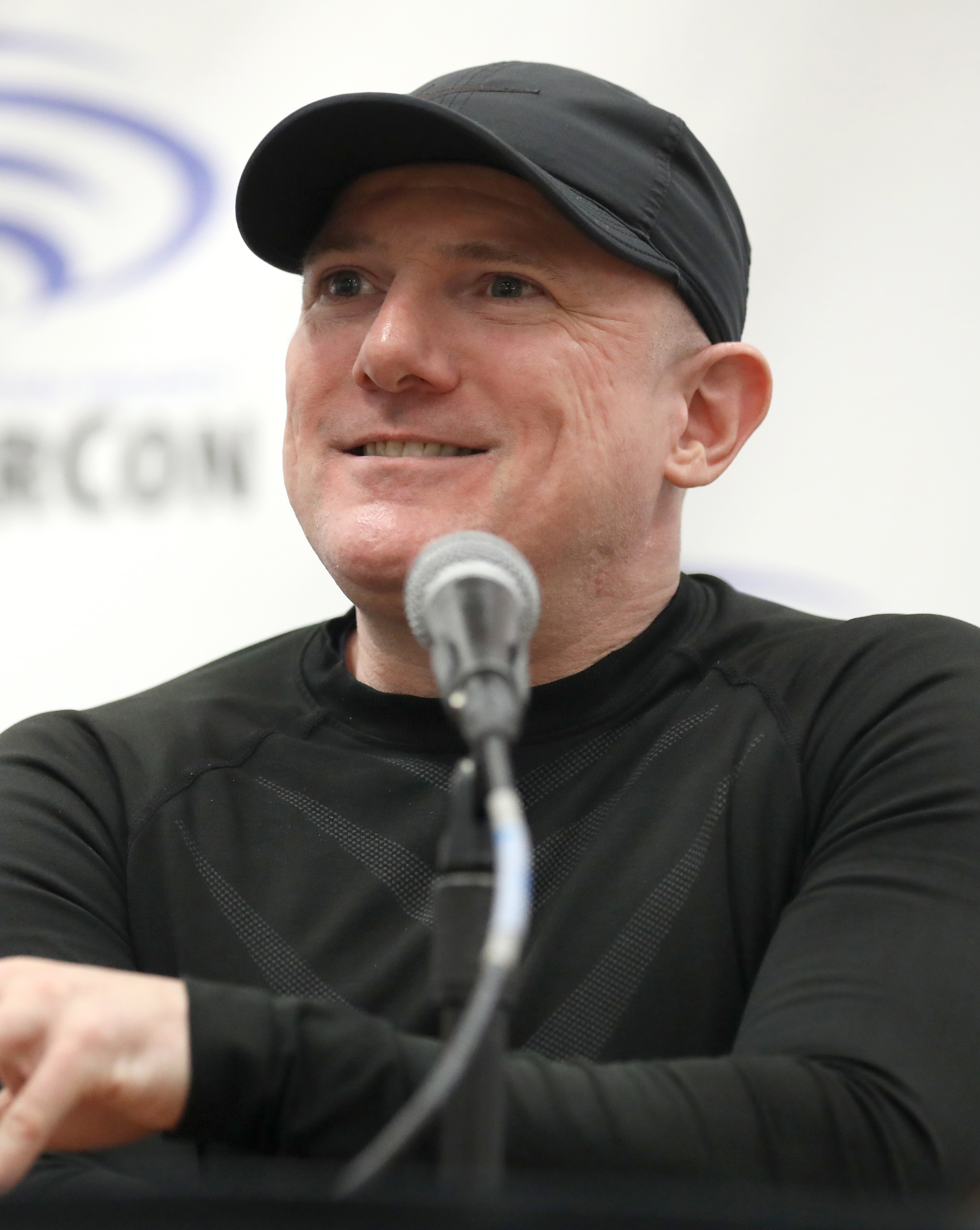
- Mack at the 2024 WonderCon
- Born: October 7, 1972 (age 54)
- Areas: Writer, Artist
- Notable works: Kabuki

David W. Mack is an American comic book artist and writer, known for his creator-owned series Kabuki and for co-creating with Joe Quesada the Marvel Comics superhero Echo.

== Early life ==
Mack graduated from Ludlow High School in 1990, where he had written and acted in many of the school theatre productions. He gave the commencement address there in 2003. Mack did not attend a specialized art school, but earned scholarships to Northern Kentucky University for five years, a four-year scholarship based on his portfolio of art works, and in his fifth year the Dean's Scholarship for academics. He graduated in 1995 with a BFA in graphic design.

== Career ==
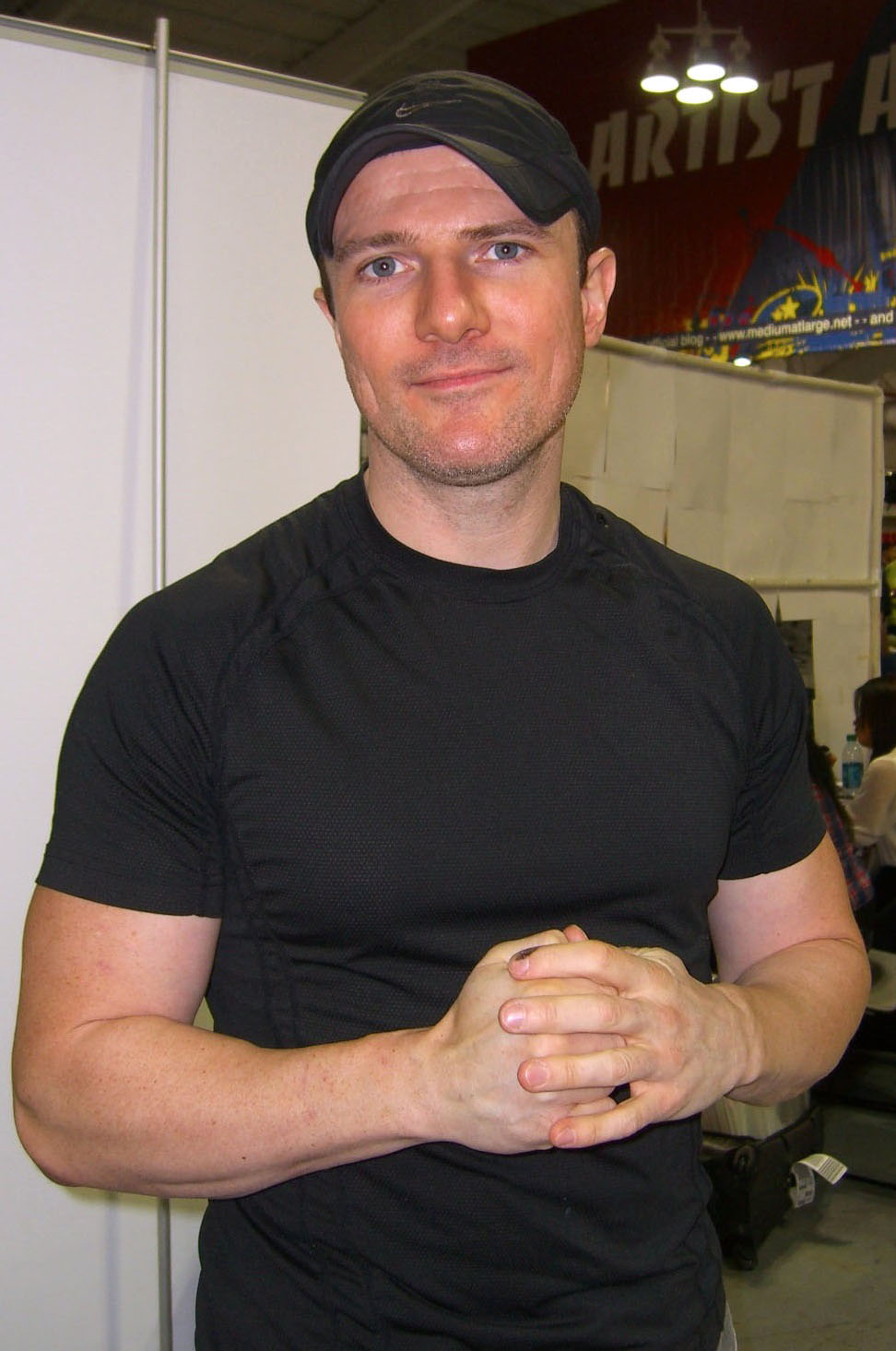
Mack at the 2012 New York Comic Con

Mack began publishing Kabuki in 1994 with Caliber Press, and later moved the series to Image Comics. It is now released through Marvel Comics' imprint Icon Comics. He completed the first book, Kabuki: Circle of Blood, while still in college. Mack has also worked on such Marvel Comics publications as Daredevil, Alias, New Avengers, and White Tiger.

In 2015, he did the cover to Clive Barker's UK Edition of The Scarlet Gospels.

He was nominated for the 2020 Eisner Award in the categories of Best Painter/Digital Artist, and Best Cover Artist.

== Bibliography ==
=== Awards and honors ===
- Best Short Story Nominee, "Silent All These Years" from Tori Amos: Little Earthquakes, The Graphic Album, Z2 Comics, Eisner Awards 2023
- Best Anthology, Group Nomination, Tori Amos: Little Earthquakes, The Graphic Album, Z2 Comics, Eisner Awards 2023
- Best Adaptation from Another Medium, Group Nomination, Tori Amos: Little Earthquakes, The Graphic Album, Z2 Comics, Eisner Awards 2023

=== Interior artwork ===
- Daredevil, Vol. 2, #16–19, #50 (with writer Brian Bendis, 2000, 2003), #51–55
- Daredevil: End of Days #3, #6, #8
- Kabuki: Fear The Reaper – 1994
- Kabuki: Circle of Blood (vol 1) #1–6
- Kabuki: Dreams (vol 2) #1–4
- Kabuki: Masks of the Noh (vol 3) #1–4
- Kabuki: Skin Deep (vol 4) #1–4
- Kabuki: Metamorphosis (vol 5) #1–9
- Kabuki: The Alchemy (vol 7) #1–9 Marvel Comics
- New Avengers #39 (with writer Brian Bendis, 2008)
- Grendel: Black, White & Red (Dark Horse Comics)
- Reflections #1–15 (Image Comics & Marvel Comics)
- Dream Logic #1–4 (Marvel Comics)
- Cover #1-6 (Marvel Comics)
- Young Dracula #1–3 (Caliber Comics)

=== Covers ===
- Jessica Jones #1–18 (2016–2018)
- Alias (2001–2004)
- Daredevil, Vol. 2, #9–25 (1999–2001)
- Green Arrow, Vol. 3, #8 (2011)
- Justice League of America, Vol. 2, #44–45, 51–53 (2010–2011)
- Miss Marvel, Vol. 2, #6–8 (2007)
- Swamp Thing, Vol. 3, #13–15 (2001)
- Ultimate Marvel Team Up #15–16 (2002)
- White Tiger #1–6 (2006)
- The Realm, Vol. 2, #7 (1994)
- American Gods, (2017–present)
  1. Shadows
  2. My Ainsel
- Stranger Things: Six #1 variant (2019)
- Fight Club 3: #2 (2019)
- Fight Club 3 Dark Horse Signing at Golden Apple Comics with Chuck Palahniuk
- Vampire: The Masquerade (2020–present)

=== Writer ===
- Daredevil, Vol. 2, #9–11, #13–15 (with artist Joe Quesada, David Ross, 1999–2000)
- Daredevil Vol. 2 #51–55 (2003–2004)
- Daredevil End of Days #1–8 (with Brian Michael Bendis, 2012–2013)
- Philip K. Dick's: Electric Ant #1–5 (with artist Pascil Alixe, 2010)
- SE7EN
- Kabuki: Fear The Reaper – 1994
- Kabuki: Circle of Blood (vol 1) #1–6
- Kabuki: Dreams (vol 2) #1–4
- Kabuki: Masks of the Noh (vol 3) #1–4
- Kabuki: Skin Deep (vol 4) #1–4
- Kabuki: Metamorphosis (vol 5) #1–9
- Kabuki: Scarab (vol 6) #1–8
- Kabuki: The Alchemy (vol 7) #1–9 (Marvel Comics)

=== Writer/artist ===
- Captain America: The Winter Soldier (2014) Main titles
- Daredevil, Vol. 2, #51–55 (2003–2004)
  - Excerpted as "Vision Quest: Echo" in Moonshot: The Indigenous Comics Collective vol. 1, pp. 12–21 (Alternate History Comics, 2015)
- Dream Logic #1–4 (2010)
- Kabuki #1–9 (1997)

=== Children's books ===
- The Shy Creatures Feiwel & Friends (2007)

Preceded by Kevin Smith	Daredevil writer 1999–2001	Succeeded by Brian Bendis
Preceded by Brian Bendis	Daredevil writer 2003–2004	Succeeded by Brian Bendis
