= A.K.A. Goldfish =

1994 comic book series

Cover of the Image Comics paperback.

A.K.A. Goldfish is the title of a 1994 American creator-owned comic book series written and drawn by Brian Michael Bendis, and published by Caliber Comics. The entire award-winning series was collected and published as a trade paperback by Caliber in 1996 and by Image, entitled Goldfish rather than A.K.A. Goldfish, in 1998, and again in 2001 as Goldfish: The Definitive Collection. Dark Horse published another collected edition, similarly titled simply Goldfish, in August 2022.

The black-and-white series is a noir fiction tale, telling the story of David Gold, a con man, who used the sobriquet "Goldfish". Gold has returned to Cleveland, Ohio after a ten-year absence in order to regain possession of his son, currently in the custody of the boy's mother and Gold's ex-girlfriend, crime boss Lauren Bacall (a reference to the well-known actress of the same name). Bacall is the owner of the Club Cinderella, a nightclub, casino and brothel, and scene for many sequences within the story.

== Titles ==
- A.K.A. Goldfish: Ace (September 1994)
- A.K.A. Goldfish: Jack (December 1994)
- Caliber Spotlight #1 (May 1995)
- A.K.A. Goldfish: Queen (May 1995)
- A.K.A. Goldfish: Joker (August 1995)
- A.K.A. Goldfish: King (January 1996)
