= Spider-Woman: Agent of S.W.O.R.D. =

Comic book series written by Brian Michael Bedis

Spider-Woman
- Cover to Spider-Woman #1; Art by Alex Maleev.

Publication information
- Publisher: Marvel Comics
- Schedule: Monthly
- Format: Limited series motion comic
- Genre: Superhero
- Publication date: November 2009 – May 2010
- No. of issues: 7
- Main character: Jessica Drew / Spider-Woman

Creative team
- Written by: Brian Michael Bendis
- Artist: Alex Maleev

Collected editions
- Spider-Woman: Agent of S.W.O.R.D.: ISBN 978-0-7851-1999-9

Spider-Woman: Agent of S.W.O.R.D. is a comic book limited series written by Brian Michael Bendis, drawn by Alex Maleev, and published by Marvel Comics from November 2009 to May 2010, starring Jessica Drew / Spider-Woman. It is the fourth Marvel Comics series initially released with the title Spider-Woman.

The series was released simultaneously in printed comic book and motion comic forms, making it the first original motion comic released by a major publisher. The series ended at issue #7.

== Storyline ==
Jessica Drew, a.k.a. Spider-Woman, is recruited by S.W.O.R.D., an agency that specializes in eliminating alien threats to Earth.

== Plot synopsis ==
The story is set shortly after the events of Marvel's Secret Invasion story line. Therein, the Skrulls infiltrated the Earth, replacing A-list super heroes with their own shape-shifting operatives. Jessica Drew, a.k.a. Spider-Woman, was replaced by the Skrull queen Veranke. The series starts with Jessica feeling very poorly about her life due to Veranke's actions. She is approached to join S.W.O.R.D. by agent Abigail Brand, which she accepts. Her first mission takes her to Madripoor, where she takes on a Skrull posing as Spider-Man. After run-ins with Hydra, another Skrull, and the new Thunderbolts, Jessica takes down a wayward Skrull with the help of her teammates in the New Avengers. After the mission is over, Brand offers her new opportunities within S.W.O.R.D.

== Critical reception ==
According to Marvel Comics, Spider-Woman #1 sold out in September 2009. According to Diamond Comics Distributors, Spider-Woman #1 was the 45th best selling comic book in September 2009.

Nick Winstead of ComicBook.com called Spider-Woman #1 "much-anticipated", stating, "This first issue is the first opportunity we've been allowed to see Jessica's deepest thoughts and feelings on her situation, and coupled with the scenes of quiet introspection are some very darkly drawn panels from Maleev, accenting the loneliness and self-imposed exile in which Drew currently finds herself. Brand's approach to her about taking the job as a sort of "alien hunter" is an intriguing new direction for her, given that her first solo series in the 1980s dealt so much with magical foes, mystery solving and encounters with costumed criminals. Brand's offer sparks Drew to take off to, of course, Madripoor, the epicenter of shady characters and criminals in the Marvel universe. [...] This first issue jumps out to an impressive start, and the pacing is quick and immediate, with the reader able to be engaged throughout. Maleev's art is the perfect compliment to the narrative, and there's a great amount of tension in what Drew tells us about her current life. Perhaps her new journey will reinspire her to carve out her destiny and identity, free of any other organization's machinery." Bryan Joel of IGN gave Spider-Woman #1 a grade of 8.2 out of 10, writing, "Spider-Woman is no doubt going to gain footnote status for spearheading Marvel's motion comics initiative. But what shouldn't be forgotten about the series in ten years' time is that its first issue is surprisingly good. Brian Michael Bendis bucks his own trend of decompression in this issue, and this issue shows Spider-Woman has a good deal on its plate. The book details Jessica Drew's mental status post-Secret Invasion, a run-in with Abigail Brand and subsequent drafting into S.W.O.R.D., and deployment on her first official mission. Bendis covers a lot of ground here, even finding time to give a quick refresher on Jessica's origin along the way. It bears mentioning that the issue is well-paced, and gives each plot beat and development room to do its thing. [...] Spider-Woman is off to a strong start. There's certainly room for improvement, but it's nice to know Jessica Drew isn't the next in the string of properties Marvel has given an ongoing series with minimal direction or reason."
