= Spider-Woman =

Name of several superheroines in Marvel Comics

- Three of the Spider-Women from Marvel's Multiverse; from left to right: Silk (Cindy Moon), Spider-Woman (Jessica Drew), and Spider-Gwen (Gwen Stacy). Artwork for the cover of Spider-Women Alpha vol. 1, 1 (April 2016 Marvel Comics); Art by Yasmine Putri
- Publisher: Marvel Comics
- First appearance: Jessica Drew: Marvel Spotlight #32 (February 1977); Julia Carpenter: Marvel Super Heroes Secret Wars #6 (October 1984); Mattie Franklin: The Spectacular Spider-Man #236 (July 1996); Charlotte Witter: The Amazing Spider-Man vol. 2, #5 (May 1999); Veranke: New Avengers #1 (January 2005); Ultimate Spider-Woman: Ultimate Spider-Man #98 (October 2006); Ashley Barton: Wolverine Vol. 3 #67 (September 2008); Gwen Stacy: Edge of Spider-Verse #2 (September 2014); Erin Hasko: Web Warriors #10 (August 2016); Claire Parker: Spider-Man: Life Story #3 (May 2019)
- Created by: Archie Goodwin (writer), Marie Severin (artist)
- Characters: Jessica Drew; Gwen Stacy; Mary Jane Watson; Julia Carpenter; Mattie Franklin; Charlotte Witter; Veranke; Erin Hasko; Claire Parker

Spider-Woman
- Spider-Woman #1 (April 1978); Featuring the Jessica Drew version. Art by Joe Sinnott.

Series publication information
- Publisher: Marvel Comics
- Format: (vols. 1, 3, 5, 6, 7); Ongoing series (vols. 2 & 4); Limited series
- Genre: Superhero
- Publication date: (vol 1); April 1978 – June 1983 (vol 2); November 1993 – February 1994 (vol 3); July 1999 – December 2000 (vol 4); November 2009 – May 2010 (vol 5); November 2014 – November 2015 (vol 6); November 2015 – March 2017 (vol 7); March 2020 – March 2022
- Number of issues: (vol. 1); 50 (vol. 2); 4 (vol. 3); 18 (vol. 4); 7 (vol. 5); 10 (vol. 6); 17 (vol. 7); 21
- Main character(s): (vols. 1, 4, 5, 6, 7); Jessica Drew (vol. 2); Julia Carpenter (vol. 3); Mattie Franklin

Spider-Woman is the code name of several fictional characters in comic books published by Marvel Comics. The first major version is Jessica Drew (and later impersonated by Veranke), the second major version is Julia Carpenter, and the third major version is Mattie Franklin. Several alternate reality incarnations of the character have additionally received attention, including the Ultimate Spider-Woman, Ashley Barton, and Gwen Stacy.

== Publication history ==
Marvel Comics' then-publisher Stan Lee said in 1978, shortly after Spider-Woman's debut in Marvel Spotlight #32 (Feb. 1977) and the start of the character's 50-issue self-titled series (cover-dated April 1978 – June 1983), the character originated because,

I suddenly realized that some other company may quickly put out a book like that and claim they have the right to use the name, and I thought we'd better do it real fast to copyright the name. So we just batted one quickly, and that's exactly what happened. I wanted to protect the name, because it's the type of thing [where] someone else might say, "Hey, why don't we put out a Spider-Woman; they can't stop us." ... You know, years ago we brought out Wonder Man, and [DC Comics] sued us because they had Wonder Woman, and ... I said okay, I'll discontinue Wonder Man. And all of a sudden they've got Power Girl [after Marvel had introduced Power Man]. Oh, boy. How unfair.

Following that initial Spider-Woman series, more followed. Volume two was a miniseries published from November 1993 through February 1994; volume three was published from July 1999 through December 2000; and volume four, featuring Jessica Drew, the original Spider-Woman, was published from November 2009 through May 2010.

Volume Five ran from November 2014 through the fall of 2015, featuring Jessica Drew as Spider-Woman. In the March 2015 issue of The Amazing Spider-Man Vol. 3 #13, Jessica boasts "I have never needed rescuing. Ever. See my wiki entry." In November 2015, Spider-Woman Vol. 6 launched as part of Marvel's All-New, All-Different event with the same creative team as Volume Five: Shifting Gears. This volume saw her wearing the same costume as in Volume Five, but now she was pregnant and once again working as a private investigator. In October 2020, Spider-Woman #5, the fifth issue of Volume Seven, being written by Karla Pacheco, marked the 100th issue of the title and Marvel celebrated the occasion with a special giant-sized issue.

== Spider-Women ==
=== Jessica Drew ===
Jessica Drew is the original Spider-Woman who left the role in the early 1980s and returned to her mantle by the late 2000s.

=== Julia Carpenter ===
Julia Carpenter is the second Spider-Woman, a former member of the Avengers and Omega Flight, and also used the Arachne and Madame Web mantles.

=== Mattie Franklin ===
Mattie Franklin briefly impersonated the then-retired Spider-Man before receiving her own short-lived comics series as well as also appeared in Alias #16–21, before going on to appear in the 2007–2008 Loners miniseries.

=== Charlotte Witter ===
Charlotte Witter is a supervillain and the granddaughter of Madame Web who used the Spider-Woman name.

=== Veranke ===
Veranke is a Super-Skrull and a queen of the Skrulls who impersonated Jessica Drew / Spider-Woman over a long period of time and was a founding member of the New Avengers.

=== Ultimate Marvel ===
A gender-swapped clone of Spider-Man appears in the Ultimate Marvel imprint, the mind of Peter Parker, teenage boy, waking up in the body of a teenage girl and having to adapt to their ‘new’ body.

=== Gwen Stacy ===
Gwen Stacy is Earth-65's version of Spider-Woman. She plays this role in the comic book series Spider-Gwen and its adaptations to film.

== Other versions ==
=== Ashley Barton ===
Wolverine Vol. 3 #67 (September 2008), depicting Spider-Bitch's first appearance. Art by Steve McNiven.

In the pages of Old Man Logan, Ashley Barton is the daughter of Tonya Parker and Hawkeye who did not like the way that Kingpin was running Hammer Falls. She becomes "Spider-Bitch", allying herself with a new Punisher and Daredevil, and plans to take back Hammer Falls, only for the group to be captured and Daredevil and Punisher to be fed to the carnivorous dinosaurs. Hawkeye breaks his daughter out of her cell, whereafter Ashley immediately beheads Kingpin which avenges Daredevil and Punisher's deaths. Then she attempts to kill her father, before taking over Hammer Falls as the new Kingpin. Old Man Logan rescues Hawkeye as Ashley sends her men after them. The character appears in the "Spider-Verse" and Spider-Geddon storylines, now referred with her father's surname as Ashley Barton, and alternately referred to as "Spider-Girl" and "Spider-Woman" due to the family-friendly nature of the narrative, and is among the spider-powered characters who are recruited by Superior Spider-Man (Doctor Octopus's mind in Peter Parker's body) to help fight the Inheritors, before returning to the Wastelands in "Venomverse" and "Old Man Quill".

=== Claire Parker ===
In Spider-Man: Life Story, Peter and Mary Jane have twins named Benjy and Claire Parker (physically designed as a composite character of Mayday Parker and the Spider-Woman (Ultimate Marvel character)). For the first ten years of their lives, the two were solely raised by Mary Jane in Portland, Oregon after she left Peter following a traumatic incident. In 1995, Peter lets Ben Reilly take over his life as Spider-Man and CEO of Parker Industries so he could return to his family. In the mid-2000s, Claire convinces Peter to return to New York and become Spider-Man once more shortly after Morlun kills Ben Reilly so he could stop Tony Stark from taking over Parker Industries and to lure Morlun away from his family. Despite his efforts, Morlun attacks the twins and Mary Jane in Oregon as Peter gets involved in the superhero Civil War. When Benjy discovers that Morlun is vulnerable when he is feeding off someone, he uses himself as bait to allow Claire the chance to impale him on a splintered log of wood. Benjy survives the assault, but is crippled for life. By 2019, Claire has become Spider-Woman (now wearing a costume the same as the Spider-Woman (Ultimate Marvel character)'s), and is instructed by her father to stay behind to protect her brother and mother as he goes to space to end Doctor Doom's reign of terror on the planet with Miles Morales (actually Otto Octavius).

=== Earth X ===
On Earth X, a character named Spidra appears. She was one of the last survivors of the Microverse following Psycho-Man's attempt to drive the entire realm mad. Escaping with the rest of the Ant Men, who were formerly known as the Microns, Spidra and the rest of the Ant Men are charged with watching Immortus. They are later present at the wedding of King Britain and Medusa.

=== Erin Hasko ===
During the Web Warriors ongoing series, on accidentally coming across actors Felix Lifson and Erin Hasko, in a world where Spider-Man is fictional, shooting a Spider-Man movie (in which Erin is playing Gwen "Spider-Gwen" Stacy / Spider-Woman), Octavia Otto and the Web Warriors invite the duo to join the team, initially not noticing the pair to be actors shooting the film. On clearing up the misunderstanding, Octavia nonetheless makes the offer again, if either of them would be open to it, and excitedly noting that she learned three different types of martial arts for a previous role, Erin joins the Web Warriors and ventures into the multiverse with them, leaving her shocked crew behind, as Felix asks if they were still filming.

Erin returns in the video game Spider-Man Unlimited, now wielding a specialized set of web-shooters made for those lacking spider-strength as a "real" Spider-Woman. After the Spider-Queen escapes from Spider-Force custody, the game's protagonist Spider-Man realizes that since Erin isn't a Spider-Totem, the Queen cannot control her, and sends her on a mission to Horizon Labs to collect a device to suppress the Queen's control over other spiders and Spider-People. Listed as "Spider-Gwen (Erin Hasko)"; in her character description, Erin is revealed to have been acting since she was three years old, with the film she was filming on her recruitment having been titled Spider-Woman: Goblin's Revenge.

=== Helen Goddard ===
An unrelated earlier Spider-Woman was published by Harry "A" Chesler's Dynamic Comics in 1944. She was Helen Goddard, a non-superpowered crime-fighter who made her first and only appearance in the Golden Age comic book Major Victory #1.

=== Marvel 2099 ===
In the unified Marvel 2099 reality of Earth-2099, a Spider-Woman with the real name of Sivern Dru appears as a member of the 2099 version of the New Avengers. She is a member of an unidentified alien species.

=== Mary Jane Watson ===
There are several alternate versions of Mary Jane Watson known as Spider-Woman. The first version is a ninja of the Spider-clan in the Marvel Mangaverse, and another version is featured in the Exiles series.

=== Mayday Parker ===
Mayday Parker, Peter and MJ's daughter from the alternate future MC2 who is commonly known as Spider-Girl, began calling herself Spider-Woman after her father's death.

=== Spider Super Stories ===
A character called Spider-Woman (Valerie the Librarian) appears in the recurring live-action skit "Spidey Super Stories" on the 1970s PBS children's television series The Electric Company, portrayed by Hattie Winston, who originated the character as the girlfriend of Easy Reader (portrayed by Morgan Freeman) before she become Spider-Woman. She also appears as Spider-Woman in the spin-off comic book series Spidey Super Stories #11 (August 1975) where she has no superpowers.

=== Squadron Supreme ===
In the Squadron Supreme series, Nell Ruggles was a young troubled girl, who upon gaining her powers killed her classmates, who had bullied her in the past. However, her superhuman powers allowed her to be traced back to a device which the Icarus One astronauts brought back from the Moon. Running away from home, she was captured by the Blur and turned over to Nick Fury's S.H.I.E.L.D. Thanks to an electroshock collar, she has been prevented from leaving, though she appears to be making the best of the situation, having made friends and eventually falling in love with Tucker Ford, Biogeneral.

== In other media ==
=== Television ===
- The Jessica Drew incarnation of Spider-Woman appears in Spider-Woman (1979), voiced by Joan Van Ark.
- The Julia Carpenter incarnation of Spider-Woman appears in Iron Man, voiced by Casey DeFranco in season one and Jennifer Hale in season two.
- The Mary Jane Watson incarnation of Spider-Woman, also referenced as Spider-MJ, appears in Ultimate Spider-Man, voiced by Tara Strong.

=== Film ===
- The Gwen Stacy incarnation of Spider-Woman appears in Spider-Man: Into the Spider-Verse, voiced by Hailee Steinfeld.
  - The Gwen Stacy incarnation of Spider-Woman and a composite character of Jessica Drew-1610 and Jessica Drew-616 named Jess Drew appear in Spider-Man: Across the Spider-Verse, voiced again by Hailee Steinfeld and Issa Rae respectively.
  - The Gwen Stacy incarnation of Spider-Woman will appear in Spider-Man: Beyond the Spider-Verse, voiced once again by Hailee Steinfeld.
  - The Jess Drew and Gwen Stacy incarnations of Spider-Woman will appear in a female-centered spin-off of Spider-Man: Into the Spider-Verse.
- The Julia Carpenter and Mattie Franklin incarnations of Spider-Woman appear in Madame Web, portrayed by Sydney Sweeney and Celeste O'Connor respectively, the former renamed Julia Cornwall after the comic-book character's maiden name.

=== Video games ===
- The Jessica Drew incarnation of Spider-Woman appears as a playable character in Marvel: Ultimate Alliance, voiced by Tasia Valenza. This version possesses her comic book counterpart's powers except her super-strength. Additionally, Julia Carpenter's Arachne suit and Mayday Parker's Spider-Girl suit also appear as alternate skins. Originally, Mattie Franklin's costume was intended to be one of the alternate costumes, but was replaced by Spider-Girl's.
- The Jessica Drew incarnation of Spider-Woman appears in the PS2 and PSP versions of Spider-Man: Web of Shadows, voiced by Mary Elizabeth McGlynn.
- The Jessica Drew incarnation of Spider-Woman appears in Marvel: Ultimate Alliance 2, voiced by Elizabeth Daily.
- Jessica Drew / Spider-Woman, Julia Carpenter / Arachne, and Gwen Stacy / Spider-Woman appear as playable characters in Marvel Super Hero Squad Online.
- The Jessica Drew incarnation of Spider-Woman appears as a playable character in Marvel Avengers Alliance.
- The Jessica Drew incarnation of Spider-Woman is a playable character in Lego Marvel Super Heroes, voiced by Kari Wahlgren.
- Gwen Stacy, Mayday Parker, Julia Carpenter, Charlotte Witter, Mattie Franklin, Ashley Barton, Erin Hasko, and both the mainstream and Ultimate versions of Jessica Drew all appear as playable characters in Spider-Man Unlimited, with Jessica Drew voiced by Laura Bailey.
- The Jessica Drew and Gwen Stacy incarnations of Spider-Woman appear as playable characters in Marvel Heroes, voiced by Ashley Johnson.
- The Jessica Drew and Gwen Stacy incarnations of Spider-Woman appear as playable characters in Marvel Puzzle Quest.
- The Ultimate Marvel incarnation of Jessica Drew / Spider-Woman, referred to as "Spider-Girl" for unknown reasons, appears as a playable character in Lego Marvel's Avengers as part of the Spider-Man DLC pack.
- The Gwen Stacy incarnation of Spider-Woman appears as a playable character in Marvel Ultimate Alliance 3: The Black Order, voiced by Allegra Clark.

=== Miscellaneous ===
- Spidey Super Stories #56 (January 1982) features Mary Jane Watson dressed as the Jessica Drew incarnation of Spider-Woman for a costume party.
- The Jessica Drew incarnation of Spider-Woman was among ten Marvel characters who appeared in a set of Marvel Comics Super Heroes commemorative postage stamps that were issued in 2007.
- An English version of Jessica Drew / Spider-Woman appears in the Spider-Woman: Agent of S.W.O.R.D. motion comic, voiced by Nicolette Reed.

== See also ==
Other female spider-themed Marvel characters

- Spider-Girl (Anya Corazon), previously Araña
- Madame Web (Cassandra Webb), grandmother of Charlotte Witter
- Black Widow (Natasha Romanoff)
- Spider-Queen (Ana Soria)
- Yelena Belova
- She-Venom (Anne Weying)
- Silk (Cindy Moon)
- SP//dr (Peni Parker)
