= Pagon =

Publication information
- Publisher: Marvel Comics
- First appearance: New Avengers #1 (December 2004).
- Created by: Brian Michael Bendis; David Finch

In-story information
- Alter ego: Pagon
- Species: War-Skrull
- Team affiliations: Skrull Empire
- Notable aliases: Elektra
- Abilities: Shapeshifting; Use of sai (as Elektra)

Pagon is a character appearing in American comic books published by Marvel Comics. Created by writer Brian Michael Bendis and artist David Finch, the character first appeared in New Avengers #1 (December 2004). He is a member of the fictional extraterrestrial Skrull species.

Killian Scott portrayed Pagon in the Marvel Cinematic Universe Disney+ miniseries Secret Invasion (2023).

== Publication history ==
Pagon was created by Brian Michael Bendis and David Finch, and debuted as a cameo in The New Avengers #1 (December 2004) before appearing with a full appearance in New X-Men vol. 2 #13 (May 2005); the character impersonated Elektra as a lead-in to the Secret Invasion storyline.

== Fictional character biography ==
Pagon was a lover of Veranke who went alongside several Skrulls to assist Siri, but his allies were killed so Pagon utilized the powers of Invisible Woman, Colossus and the Thing to severely blindside Elektra who he impersonated. His infiltration as the leader of the Hand and Hydra resulted in arranging the Raft's breakout, and harassing the X-Men. Pagon kills, resurrects and imprisons Maya Lopez to use as a weapon before the New Avengers rescue his victim who stabs the Skrull to death.

== Powers and abilities ==
Pagon possesses the ability to physically transform himself like other Skrulls.

== In other media ==
- Pagon appears in The Avengers: Earth's Mightiest Heroes. This version impersonated Viper / Madame Hydra.
- Pagon / Elektra appears as a boss in Marvel Heroes.
- Pagon appears in Secret Invasion, portrayed by Killian Scott. This version is a member of Gravik's Skrull resistance who posed as an unidentified captured man.
