= Victoria Hand =

- Victoria Hand. Art by Oliver Coipel.

Publication information
- Publisher: Marvel Comics
- First appearance: The Invincible Iron Man #8 (Dec. 2008)
- Created by: Brian Michael Bendis (writer); Mike Deodato (artist)

In-story information
- Alter ego: Victoria Hand
- Species: Human
- Team affiliations: S.H.I.E.L.D. Dark Avengers; H.A.M.M.E.R. New Avengers
- Partnerships: Norman Osborn
- Abilities: Highly skilled in information gathering, logistics, strategic management and espionage.

Victoria Hand is a fictional supporting character appearing in American comic books published by Marvel Comics, in particular those featuring the American espionage organization S.H.I.E.L.D. of which Hand was a member.

Saffron Burrows portrayed the character in the first season of the Marvel Cinematic Universe TV series Agents of S.H.I.E.L.D., while Rachele Schank portrayed her younger self in the seventh season.

== Publication history ==
Victoria Hand was created by Brian Michael Bendis and Mike Deodato. Her first appearance was in The Invincible Iron Man #8 by the creative team of Matt Fraction and Salvador Larroca, although her subsequent appearance in Dark Avengers #1, by Bendis and Deodato, predates this in continuity.

Hand appeared as a supporting character throughout the 2010-2013 New Avengers series from issue #1 (Aug. 2010) through the character's death in issue #32 (Dec. 2012).

== Fictional character biography ==
Victoria Hand is introduced as a S.H.I.E.L.D. accountant, dating a fellow agent named Isabelle, who has different beliefs about the fight against criminals and terrorists. Three years before the Secret Invasion storyline, Hand sent a letter to S.H.I.E.L.D. director Nick Fury about his war on terrorism and her concerns that he was doing a poor job. Isabelle implored Hand not to send the letter. The result was Hand's transferral to a S.H.I.E.L.D. base in Portland, Oregon. Hand's relationship broke down due to Isabelle's anger over her advice being ignored.

During the "Dark Reign" storyline, Norman Osborn becomes the head of S.H.I.E.L.D. and transforms the organization into the operation known as H.A.M.M.E.R. He appoints Hand to the position of deputy director of this organization due to her vocal opposition of previous S.H.I.E.L.D. directors Nick Fury and Tony Stark. Hand willingly supports Osborn's agenda to subvert the heroes and place villains instead, believing that Osborn would bring peace to the world. Hand also has a certain level of authority over Osborn's Avengers despite Osborn giving Moonstone the position of his second-in-command.

Hand is arrested following an attack on the Asgardians. She is taken onto a Helicarrier, where she is interviewed by Steve Rogers. Hand states that she does not regret her actions and is trying to help the world. In response, Rogers appoints Hand as the liaison to the New Avengers. After Osborn's Dark Avengers launch their attack, Hand reveals to the New Avengers that she was actually a triple agent, pretending to work for both Captain America and Norman Osborn while actually working for Captain America.

Hand is possessed by Daniel Drumm's ghost during his revenge attack on the New Avengers for what happened to his brother Jericho. Under Drumm's possession, she is forced to kill Daimon Hellstrom and Jennifer Kale. After Doctor Strange dispatches her in the Avengers Mansion and brings her to the astral plane, Hand is killed by Drumm.

== In other media ==
Saffron Burrows as Victoria Hand in Agents of S.H.I.E.L.D..

- Victoria Hand appears in Agents of S.H.I.E.L.D., portrayed by Saffron Burrows. This version is the titular S.H.I.E.L.D. base's director. Upon learning of Hydra infiltrators in S.H.I.E.L.D., Hand leads a team in weeding them out. In the process, she captures S.H.I.E.L.D. turncoat John Garrett, who is exposed as a double agent, but is killed by Grant Ward. Additionally, a young, alternate timeline version of Hand appears in the series finale, "The End Is at Hand" and "What We're Fighting For", portrayed by Rachele Schank.
- Victoria Hand appears in Marvel Snap.
