= Spider-Woman (Jessica Drew) =

Marvel Comics superhero

Jessica Drew Spider-Woman
- Textless cover of Spider-Woman #11 (April 2021). Art by Junggeun Yoon.

Publication information
- Publisher: Marvel Comics
- First appearance: Marvel Spotlight #32 (February 1977)
- Created by: Archie Goodwin (writer); Marie Severin (artist)

In-story information
- Alter ego: Jessica Miriam Drew
- Species: Human mutate
- Team affiliations: Avengers; Daughters of Liberty; Hydra; Lady Liberators; New Avengers; S.H.I.E.L.D.; Strikeforce; S.W.O.R.D.; Secret Avengers; Spider-Army/Web-Warriors
- Partnerships: Captain Marvel; Porcupine (Roger Gocking)
- Notable aliases: Arachne; Ariadne Hyde; Hunter
- Abilities: Master spy; Highly skilled martial artist; Spider-physiology granting: Superhuman strength, speed, durability, reflexes, and senses; Pheromone manipulation; Bio-electric energy projection; Gliding/Flight; Wall-crawling

Spider-Woman (Jessica Drew) is a character appearing in American comic books published by Marvel Comics. Created by Archie Goodwin and Marie Severin, the character first appeared in Marvel Spotlight #32 (February 1977) as a brainwashed spy working for Hydra who becomes a superhero and private investigator (P.I.). 50 issues of an ongoing series titled Spider-Woman followed. At its conclusion, she fell into disuse, supplanted by other characters using the name Spider-Woman, with a planned reinvention of Drew returning to her P.I. roots becoming Alias and its protagonist Jessica Jones by Brian Michael Bendis and Michael Gaydos, depicted as having the same career, hair colour, and friends as Drew, her being a hitherto-before-unmentioned superhero created due to Bendis having been a fan of Drew. Bendis then added Spider-Woman to the roster of the New Avengers, which leads to her involvement in the "Secret Invasion" storyline. In 2009, the character received her second self-titled limited series, written by Bendis, which ran for seven issues. As part of the 2014 "Spider-Verse" event, Spider-Woman began her third ongoing series, written by Dennis Hopeless. The series was interrupted by Marvel's 2015 "Secret Wars" event, and ended with issue #10. Spider-Woman was relaunched several months later with a new issue #1, still written by Hopeless, which continued the story from the previous volume.

Jessica Drew has been described as one of Marvel's most notable and powerful female heroes. Joan Van Ark voiced her in the solo television series Spider-Woman (1979–1980). She made her cinematic debut in Spider-Man: Across the Spider-Verse (2023) as Jess Drew, voiced by Issa Rae.

== Concept and creation ==
Marvel Comics' then-publisher Stan Lee said in 1978, shortly after Spider-Woman's debut in Marvel Spotlight #32 (February 1977) and the start of the character's 50-issue, self-titled series (April 1978 - June 1983), that the character originated because

I suddenly realized that some other company may quickly put out a book like that and claim they have the right to use the name, and I thought we'd better do it real fast to copyright the name. So we just batted one quickly, and that's exactly what happened. I wanted to protect the name, because it's the type of thing [where] someone else might say, 'Hey, why don't we put out a Spider-Woman; they can't stop us.' … You know, years ago we brought out Wonder Man, and [DC Comics] sued us because they had Wonder Woman, and… I said okay, I'll discontinue Wonder Man. And all of a sudden they've got Power Girl [after Marvel had introduced Power Man]. Oh, boy. How unfair.

Spider-Woman's origin and basic character were designed by Archie Goodwin, while her visual appearance was designed by freelancer Marie Severin.

== Publication history ==
=== Original series ===
Though by most accounts, Spider-Woman was intended as a one-off character for the sake of simply establishing trademark, Marvel Spotlight #32 sold unexpectedly well and writer/editor Marv Wolfman was asked to take the character to an ongoing series.

In her first appearance, Spider-Woman was to be an actual spider evolved into a human as imagined by writer/co-creator Goodwin. Her debut was shortly followed by a four-issue story arc in Marvel Two-in-One in which Wolfman presented a different origin as he felt her original origin was too implausible for mid-1970s readers. During this arc and the premiere issue of her own comic, Spider-Woman was identified as the human Jessica Drew (combining the first name of Wolfman's daughter and the last name of fictional detective Nancy Drew), who had memories of being a spider implanted into her by the terrorist group Hydra. Her costume was also redesigned for her series to incorporate a long wig.

Jessica Drew's feelings of isolation from other people were a major theme of the first year and a half of her series. Scene from Spider-Woman #2 (May 1978); story by Marv Wolfman, pencils by Carmine Infantino, inks by Tony DeZuniga.

Wolfman introduced Spider-Woman's mentor Charles Magnus and archenemies Morgan le Fay and the Brothers Grimm. He left the series after issue #8, citing a heavy workload, but later admitted "If truth be told, I never felt comfortable writing her. I never found a handle for her and kept trying until I finally decided to leave the book". Neophyte Mark Gruenwald became the writer, while the series's regular penciler, comics legend Carmine Infantino, remained on board, having developed a fondness for the character and her stories. Gruenwald continued with the macabre themes Wolfman had used, while putting more focus on Drew's struggles to deal with her social awkwardness, shyness, and the negative reactions she produced in nearly everyone she met. The last of these is revealed to be caused by fear-inducing pheromones, a previously unrevealed ability. Gruenwald also introduced outgoing aspiring actress Lindsay McCabe, who became Drew's best friend and the mainstay of her supporting cast.

Marvel had been heavily advertising the series from the start, and during Gruenwald's run an animated TV series began airing. But Roger Stern, who replaced Wolfman as editor, recounted that Spider-Woman had already lost her status as a top seller by this time. Despite her differing origin and powers and Wolfman's deliberate effort to avoid Spider-Man guest appearances or crossovers, readers still tended to see the character as a female Spider-Man. "They saw her, and later the She-Hulk", Stern explained, "as running a good idea into the ground, much as DC had done in the '60s with its then-ever-growing families of Super- and Bat-characters".

Issue #20 saw the departure of Gruenwald, Infantino, and Stern. New writer Michael Fleisher gave Spider-Woman a career as a bounty hunter, abandoned both the series' macabre tone and outstanding subplots such as Charles Magnus' mysterious disappearance, and replaced them with such superhero standbys as criminal masterminds and a love interest who is enamored of the protagonist's costumed guise but oblivious to her in her civilian identity. Many fans criticized that Fleisher had taken away everything that made the character special. Fleisher would be retained on the series up until #32, after which Chris Claremont, already a big-name writer for his work on Uncanny X-Men, took over and switched Jessica Drew's occupation from bounty hunter to private investigator. Steve Leialoha was drawing the series by this time.

The series had already come under criticism for its rapid turnover of writers, and like all of its writers, Claremont had a fairly short stay on Spider-Woman. After 13 issues, both he and Leialoha were compelled to leave for other projects. Their final issue marked the return of Gruenwald, this time as editor. He was promptly informed that due to dwindling sales, Marvel was canceling the series, and issue #50 would be the last. Gruenwald hired comic book novices Ann Nocenti and Brian Postman as writer and penciler for the final four issues, under the theory that their inexperience in the medium would give them a unique perspective and perhaps take the series out with a bang. Under Gruenwald's direction, the series returned to its macabre roots and resumed the long-abandoned subplot of Magnus's disappearance. The final issue used a photo cover of Marvel staffers (including Gruenwald and Nocenti) in costume as the issue's cast, and had Spider-Woman perish in a climactic battle with her nemesis Morgan le Fay. Nocenti reasoned, "These are licensed characters and you want them to have a forever life. At the same time, they live in a violent world and occasionally you feel like someone has to die, otherwise it's too unreal.”

Readers were outraged at the character being killed, and Nocenti and Gruenwald both came to feel remorse over their decision. Gruenwald took the readers' reaction especially to heart, and became determined to fix what he saw as a major mistake. He and Stern had been paired up again on Avengers, but with their jobs swapped, and he instructed Stern to write a story reviving Drew. Less than a year after her death, Spider-Woman was resurrected in The Avengers #240-241 (Feb.-March 1984), the superheroes discovered Drew in her dire medical straits and helped her with the assistance of Doctor Strange.

=== Decline ===
For the next four years, she was limited to a handful of guest appearances. In 1988, she and Lindsay McCabe joined the supporting cast of Wolverine, appearing through the first 16 issues of the character's series, followed by brief returns in issues #27 and 125–128. She was never depicted in costume during her appearances in Wolverine, sticking with her civilian identity, though she did often use her powers to aid Wolverine.

In 1996, Mark Gruenwald returned to the character with a short back-up feature in Sensational Spider-Man Annual '96. Titled "The Return of Spider-Woman", it put Drew back in costume for the first time in over a decade and ended with a teaser for further Spider-Woman adventures in Spider-Man Team Up. Gruenwald died, however, before these stories could be written, and subsequent appearances treated "The Return of Spider-Woman" as non-canon. In 1999, Drew was again placed in the role of non-costumed supporting character, this time to the third Spider-Woman, Mattie Franklin, for the first 11 issues of Spider-Woman volume 3.

Drew made an appearance in a 2003 story arc in Alias, a series written by Brian Michael Bendis. Bendis would write most of the character's adventures for the next decade.

=== Revival through New Avengers ===
In January 2005, New Avengers was launched, ostensibly with Jessica Drew as a member of the titular supergroup, back in costume as Spider-Woman. Though this Jessica Drew would later be revealed as an imposter, this prominent exposure of the character opened the door for new attention to her original adventures. Firstly, on 21 December 2005, Marvel released the first issue of Spider-Woman: Origin, a five-part miniseries co-written by Brian Michael Bendis and Brian Reed, illustrated by the art team of the Luna Brothers, Jonathan and Joshua Luna. It was largely an extended retelling of Marvel Spotlight #32, though some details were changed.

Secondly, the original Spider-Woman series was reprinted in its entirety, along with Marvel Spotlight #32 and all her contemporaneous guest appearances, in a pair of Essentials trade paperbacks, the first released simultaneously with Spider-Woman: Origin #1, the second in 2007.

In 2009, the "Secret Invasion" storyline introduced the concept that, with the exception of some flashback scenes, all of Jessica Drew's appearances in New Avengers over the past four years were actually made by a Skrull imposter. Writer Bendis said he had this planned since New Avengers #1.

You can go back to issue #1 and see hints. […] Now you know why the Spider-Woman series didn't happen. We thought about doing it and having her revealed as a Skrull in the first issue of her series. […] I wrote it, but in the end I just thought it wasn't selling somebody what they thought you were selling them.

Following this story, the real Drew supplanted her doppelganger as a regular member of The New Avengers. She was also featured in another solo limited series during this time, which was published both in printed form and as a motion comic. It was written by Bendis with art by Alex Maleev and lasted 7 issues. Following the cancellation of New Avengers, Spider-Woman appeared as a regular character throughout the 2010-2013 Avengers series, from issue #1 (July 2010) through its final issue #34 (January 2013). She appears as a regular character in the 2014 Secret Avengers.

=== Spider-Verse and several new solo series ===
In 2014, Jessica was a key player in the Spider-Verse event. Spinning out of that event, a new fifth volume Spider-Woman series was started, written by Dennis Hopeless. In issue #5 the series featured the first redesign of Jessica's costume since it was created in the 1970s. This series was interrupted by Marvel's 2015 Secret Wars event, and ended with issue #10. Spider-Woman Volume 6 was relaunched several months later with a new issue #1, still written by Hopeless and continues the story from the previous volume. Spider-Woman, Gwen Stacy and Silk were the protagonists of the Spider-Women event. Spider-Woman issues #6 and #7 were the tie-ins. The ongoing was cancelled after 17 issues.

In the fall of 2019, Marvel announced a new ongoing with Karla Pacheco on writing and Pere Perez on art duties, the first issue was released in March, 2020. As part of the relaunch, the character received a redesigned costume that was created by Dave Johnson. From issue #11 onwards, she returned to her original 70's costume. During the Devil's Reign event, the comic series received two tie-ins with issue #18 and #19.

== Fictional character biography ==
=== Origins ===
==== Original ====
Spider-Woman was born Jessica Miriam Drew, daughter of American scientist Jonathan Drew and French citizen Miriam Drew, in London, England. At a young age, her family moves from their apartment in Paris, France to a lab built by her father and High Evolutionary near Mount Wundagore, where she becomes gravely ill from months of uranium exposure. To save her life, her father injects her with an experimental serum based on irradiated spiders' blood and Wyndham places her in a genetic accelerator due to the serums incubation period. Shortly after, her mother dies and her father leaves for the United States, leaving Wyndham to care for her. Her aging slows in the machine, leaving her 17 years old when she is removed.

Drew is ostracized by the other residents of Mount Wundagore, the High Evolutionary's New Men, causing her to leave and seek human civilization. She is captured by a Hydra reserve unit under Count Otto Vermis's leadership who erases her memories, brainwashes her, and recruits her as a Hydra agent under the codename Arachne. Jared, a top Hydra agent, is assigned to train her in combat and espionage, and to seduce her. Once Jessica has become his lover, he allows himself to be captured by S.H.I.E.L.D. so that she can be goaded into assassinating S.H.I.E.L.D. commander Nick Fury.

While battling Fury, Jessica accidentally kills Jared and learns Hydra's true nature. She assaults Hydra's base, sending Count Vermis into a fatal crash, but not before he unlocks memory implants that she was actually an evolved spider and had killed a man before her association with Hydra. Despondent from these revelations, she wanders the woods where Vermis crashed until being recaptured and hypnotized by Hydra.

==== Spider-Woman: Origin ====
Origin retcons the spider-blood serum and genetic accelerator elements of the character's previous origin story. Instead, Jessica's powers derive from her mother's womb being hit by a laser beam containing the DNA traits of several different species of spiders (the Drews were trying to harness spiders' environmental adaptive capabilities to graft them into the human genome).

After Jessica's parents disappear under mysterious circumstances, Jessica is recruited into Hydra under false pretenses, where she is made into a formidable fighter and assassin. She is trained and mentored by Taskmaster, who trains her in many martial disciplines and more than seven different fighting styles out of his own "arsenal".

Origin made many modifications to Drew's origin, with her being born in Wundagore, and her father being funded by Hydra and working with Miles Warren

=== Spider-Woman ===
As Spider-Woman, Jessica Drew is ordered to abduct Alicia Masters, but clashes with Ben Grimm, allowing her to recover from her brainwashing and help save Masters. She and Grimm then encounter Modred the Mystic, who removes Hydra's memory implants and restores her memories.

Jessica moves to London, but struggles to adjust. She meets S.H.I.E.L.D agent Jerry Hunt, who becomes enamored with her. She is also approached by the mysterious sorcerer Magnus, who offers help. After defending him from Morgan Le Fay she relocates with him to Los Angeles, where he tutors her in the ways of civilization and informs her that her father was murdered, leading her on a hunt for his killer. She begins a relationship with Hunt, and together they find her father's killer, who dies shortly after confessing.

Eventually, both Hunt and Magnus part ways with Drew. She becomes a receptionist at a hotel, where she attended group therapy and took medication for her pheromones, before losing the job. Jessica forms a strong friendship with fellow patient and aspiring actress Lindsay McCabe and developed acquaintances with several other superheroes.

The next few months of Jessica's life are not covered by published stories. During this time, she becomes a bounty hunter working in partnership with paraplegic criminologist Scotty McDowell, and finds a police liaison in Captain Walsh. Her working relationship with Scotty fails, so she relocates with Lindsay to San Francisco.. She begins a romantic relationship with their landlord David Ishima, and sets up a practice as a licensed private investigator. Lindsay deduces her secret identity, but is unbothered.

Drew sacrifices her immunity powers to save Giant-Man and reveals her secret identity to David Ishima, causing him to leave her.

Jessica and Magnus travels in astral form to 6th century England to defeat Morgan le Fey. She is successful, but her body dies while her spirit was gone. At her request, Magnus places a spell over humanity to remove all memory of Jessica's existence. This spell fails, and Tigra and the Shroud discover Jessica's corpse. They contact the Avengers and Doctor Strange, who travel to the astral plane to defeat Le Fay, who wanted to claim Drew's body. Strange and Magnus reunite Jessica's spirit with her human body, though Magnus's life and Jessica's powers are sacrificed in the process, leading to Drew abandoning her Spider-Woman identity and continuing her life as a private investigator in San Francisco, assisted by Lindsay and, for a time, Tigra.

Jessica and Lindsay take a job delivering the Black Blade to Japan, but while passing through Madripoor, Jessica is enchanted by the blade. By this time, her superhuman strength, agility, and ability to cling to walls have returned. She is freed from the blade's power by Lindsay and an underworld figure called Patch. Jessica and Lindsay set up business in Madripoor, with Patch as a frequent ally and information source.

Drew's life settles down until Charlotte Witter, a villainess going by the Spider-Woman name, steals her powers and leaves her near death. She and Mattie Franklin are instructed by Madame Web to track down Witter. Franklin absorbs from Witter the powers of all four Spider-Women. Jessica remains with the pair, and her powers slowly return.

=== Secret Invasion ===
A Hydra agent known as Connely offers her powers back if she would rejoin S.H.I.E.L.D. as a double agent. Drew contacts Nick Fury who urges her to accept the offer, as a triple agent for S.H.I.E.L.D. The Hydra cell is in fact a team of Skrulls who abduct Drew, so that their current Queen Veranke could take her place in the New Avengers and assume her role as Fury's spy in preparation for the upcoming invasion.

After the invasion is repulsed, Tony Stark finds a Skrull ship in orbit with all the replaced heroes, including Drew.

=== Avenger and agent of S.W.O.R.D. ===
Jessica Drew joins the New Avengers. She also joins the Lady Liberators along with other female heroes to discover the identity of the Red Hulk. Alongside her work with the Avengers, Jessica Drew joins S.W.O.R.D., under an invitation by Abigail Brand. Her membership in the organization takes her on a number of missions eliminating hostile aliens operating on Earth.

Jessica is asked by Steve Rogers himself to join his team of Avengers, which she feels she does not deserve.

Jessica Drew becomes a member of the new Secret Avengers.

=== Spider-Verse and Post-Avenger life ===
During the "Spider-Verse" storyline, Spider-Woman is among the spider-themed superheroes brought to Earth-13 to form a resistance against Morlun and his family, the Inheritors. After being hunted by the Inheritors, she was sent by Spider-Man to the Loomworld, home of the Inheritors to gather more information on the Inheritors. Replacing her Loomworld doppelganger Loomworld, who was Morlun's lover, she was able to gather intelligence in regards to the Master Weaver and his role in the conflict, which helped the Spider Army ultimately win the battle against the Inheritors.

After the battle with the Inheritors, Jessica decided to quit the Avengers in order to start a new life and to focus on helping ordinary civilians. Jessica decides to help common people solve crimes, and enlists Ben Urich and Roger Gocking, the Porcupine.

=== Secret Wars ===
Jessica Drew's new look in the aftermath of Spider-Verse was the first costume change in more than 35 years since the character's creation. Spider-Woman (vol. 5) #9. Cover art by Javier Rodríguez.

Knowing the universe will end soon, Reed Richards and Susan Storm choose Jessica and Natasha Romanoff to copilot a ship that will contain a handpicked few to restart humanity and escape the destruction of the universe. Their ship is shot down when the Children of Tomorrow from the Ultimate Universe invade, and she and the ship's passengers are killed in the ensuing explosion. This timeline and the resulting deaths were later undone.

=== Post-Secret Wars ===
In the debut issue of the new volume set after the Secret Wars, Jessica is in the second trimester of pregnancy and still works as a private investigator. Although there were various debates about the father's identity, after the baby's birth, Jessica admitted that, while she had been in a relationship over nine months ago that started her interest in a family, the man left before she could bring it up directly, prompting her to go to a sperm bank instead. She eventually gives birth to a son whom she names Gerry. Gerry also inherited her power set. After Porcupine is nearly killed by Hobgoblin, Jessica and Roger fall in love and start dating while continuing to raise Gerry.

During the "Spider-Geddon" storyline, Spider-Woman comes together with the Spider-Army again as she is part of Kaine Parker's group on their mission to claim the crystal containing Solus' lifeforce before Verna claims it. She escapes with the crystal during the fight with Verna and the Hounds. After returning to Earth-616, Spider-Woman is captured by Jennix, who takes the crystal and uses it to resurrect Solus. In the end, the Spider-Army manages to free Jessica and defeat the Inheritors, using cloning technology to revert them into babies.

In the storyline "End of the Spider-Verse", Spider-Woman is attacked by Spider-Man Noir, who had been controlled by Shathra. She is severed from the Web of Life and Destiny, effectively killing her. The Web is later cleansed of Shathra's corruption, resurrecting Spider-Woman. In the storyline "Gang War", it is revealed that Gerry Drew was kidnapped by Hydra during the period that Jessica was dead, rapidly aged into an adult, and manipulated into serving Hydra as Green Mamba.

== Powers and abilities ==
Jessica's venom blasts. Variant cover of Spider-Woman #5.

After her mother, pregnant with Jessica, was struck with a beam of radiation containing the DNA of several different types of spiders, Jessica Drew developed superhuman powers patterned after several different types of spiders when she was born. Jessica is super-humanly strong and is able to lift around seven tons at her peak. She also possesses superhuman speed, stamina, agility, and reflexes. Jessica's body is more resistant to injury than an ordinary person's, allowing her to take far more physical punishment compared to the average human. Jessica also possesses superhuman hearing and smell, the latter of which allowed her to distinguish a life-model decoy from the real Nick Fury. Jessica's palms and soles secrete a special fluid that allows her to cling to solid objects, like a true spider. Jessica's physical makeup also makes her highly resistant to all terrestrial poisons, toxins, and completely immune to radiation. While she is typically rendered dizzy by the initial dose, she is completely immune to it after being exposed again. She also exudes a high concentration of pheromones that elicit pleasure and attraction from others, depending on unknown factors which might include gender and mood, although she typically uses a chemical "perfume" that renders these pheromones inert. This ability appears to be passive. Jessica's body also produces an inordinate amount of bio-electrical energy which she can discharge from her hands. She refers to these discharges as "venom blasts", although they actually have nothing to do with poison and typically cause pain and unconsciousness. Jessica can kill a person in the same way that a lightning bolt would and can pierce solid metals like steel by using her blasts at their greatest intensity. Jessica's Hydra-designed costume with its web-like wings, combined with her body's natural bio-electricity, allowed her to glide on air currents, but she seems to have gained the ability to fly after being replaced by the Skrull Queen, Veranke. Jessica has lost her powers in numerous ways and on several occasions, but after returning to Earth at the end of the Secret Invasion, Jessica's powers were restored and are greater than ever.

In addition to her powers, she is a skilled hand-to-hand combat fighter, and has trained in several styles of fighting including boxing, capoeira, judo, karate, and tai chi, learned under the training of the Taskmaster. She has also had training in fencing and the use of many other weapons. Jessica was trained by Hydra and S.H.I.E.L.D. in covert operations, stealth, espionage, and information gathering. She speaks several foreign languages, including Korean, Russian, French, Spanish, Portuguese, and German. Jessica has also received vocational training in undercover detective work and sometimes carries a Walther PPK handgun.

== Cultural impact and legacy ==
=== Critical reception ===
James Whitbrook of Gizmodo referred to Jessica Drew as one of the "greatest Spider-Women of all time", writing, "There could only be one at the top of the list, and it's the one that really started it all. Created in a quick rush so Marvel could squat on the name to avoid rivals capitalizing on Spider-Man's success, Jessica Drew's story as Spider-Woman has seen her grow into a role and character that makes her so much more than the "female Spider-Man" her name might imply. Hell, she's always been her own damn hero—over the years since her debut, Jessica has been a super spy, an Agent of SHIELD, an Avenger, a private investigator, and many other things, but most importantly, she's never been in Peter Parker's shadow, willingly far removed from the world of Spiders to do her own thing. She's always been a kickass, witty hero that's every-bit deserving of Spider-praise as her distant friend Peter." IGN called Jessica Drew one of the "greatest Avengers of all time", saying, "after living a life full of subterfuge, murder, and entanglements with the terrorist group H.Y.D.R.A., Jessica Drew joined up with the New Avengers during the super villain breakout at the Raft. Ever a controversial member because of her mother (she runs HYDRA), she must constantly deal with the judgment of her teammates (they don't trust her). To make matters worse, during the event Secret Invasion an Earth-shattering twist revealed that the Skrull Queen Veranke had been impersonating her since New Avengers #1. Luck has often not been on Drew's side, but she has proven her ability to rise above adversity and be every bit a hero as the next member. She is not the only member with a soiled reputation; in fact, she is currently romantically involved with the bad boy of the Avengers, Hawkeye. Her super strength and agility combined with her Venom Blast stunning ability make her a formidable opponent, and her personality adds a refreshing lightness to the team." Chase Magnett of ComicBook.com described Jessica Drew as a "classic character", stating, "Spider-Woman's new costume replaces a skintight spandex suit from the 70's with a more wearable look including a customized leather jacket. This superficial adjustment reflects a much deeper change to the character. It has been decades since Jessica Drew was featured in an ongoing solo title (Spider-Woman: Agent of SWORD was originally planned as an ongoing in 2009, but altered to a mini-series) and Spider-Woman #5 is concerned primarily with defining her without the Avengers or a team-up. Spider-Woman is striking out from her previous affiliations in order to "try living a normal life". Normal is a relative concept though, and it appears that working as an urban crimefighter and investigator may be as close as it comes. Rodriguez's gorgeous new costume design is not the only part of Spider-Woman that looks great. He toys with panel compositions and sound effects in such a way as to make the entire reading experience a joy. He is a comics craftsman with a style that is still entirely his own. Just like Jessica Drew he is showing off the flexibility and potential of someone who has been involved in superhero comics for many years. […] Spider-characters like Silk, Spider-Gwen, and Spider-Woman are filling the gap left behind by a grown-up Peter Parker; they're also more reflective of the readers who are interested in comics and superheroes. There's still a place for Spider-Man and his classic friends like The Human Torch and Daredevil, but there are more opportunities new heroes to join them. All of these women and other new characters like Ms. Marvel and the All-New Ghost Rider represent a new wave of superheroes. They are following in the footsteps of Spider-Man: a hero of the people who reflects our own concerns and worries (while going on fantastic adventures). And as time goes on they are reflecting the men and women who love those adventures better every year." Abdul R. Siddiqui of Mic stated, "Critics love to argue that comics follow the traditional extremes of either portraying a damsel in distress or a femme fatale. However, if they were to actually study many of the prominent characters, they would see just how false this notion is. The best example to argue against such criticisms would be the role of Spider-Woman in Agent of S.W.O.R.D. In terms of portrayal, protagonist Jessica Drew neither dons the virtuous garb of the diminutive, shy lady in waiting nor the leather-clad battle armor of the fighting vixen. Instead, the protagonist spends much of the series in loose trench coats or wife beater shirts more suited to a cage fighter than an attractive woman. At numerous points, she is shown bloodied and beaten to an inch of her life. Certainly, the portrayal does not make her physically beautiful but there is an abstract allure. Also, in terms of characterization, she is neither entirely pure of heart nor is she the conniving type that so strangely fascinates men in power. Instead, she is a woman whose drive for revenge actually demonstrates deep-seated fears of loneliness and betrayal. Even the motion comic picks a voice actress whose take on the character is in no way sultry, yet it is strangely unique and filled with emotion. Therefore, it is safe to say that no traditional criticism of the unrealistic standards or insulting portrayal of women in comics applies to this character and she can therefore not be called a sexist caricature. Instead, she is an individual with so much depth beyond that material that she instead represents ideals. Plus, keep in mind that she also has the ability to control the men around her through pheromones she secretes from her body, once again demonstrating the Petrarchan desire for the female to rule the man who finds her beautiful."

Kath Leroy of CBR.com referred to Jessica Drew as an "iconic superheroine", saying, "Marvel Comics has a very long tradition and during its decades of existence, they created hundreds of memorable stories, superheroes, and villains. One of the most popular Marvel superheroes is Spider-Man but he's not the only person with this set of powers, not by a long shot. There's also Spider-Woman. Multiple women have held this name but Jessica Drew is the most famous of them all. It will hardly come as a surprise she teamed up with Spider-Man on more than one occasion but she has a lot of going on in her life. Many fans like the courageous Spider-Woman and created amazing fan arts of her. Jessica Drew clearly knows where she stands, and it's not on the side of evil. Again, she might not be as famous as Spider-Man but that doesn't make her any less formidable, and it also doesn't mean she should be underestimated. Spider-Woman is very well able to protect those she cares about, whether it's the people around her, or the city she lives in." Joshua Isaak of Screen Rant described Jessica Drew as a "beloved fan-favorite", stating, "The superhero is unique among others within the Marvel Universe; Jessica Drew has a network of friends who know her true identity, she's a single mother, and her book routinely break the fourth wall without a Deadpool-like awareness of the medium or the reader. […] Outside of the Skrull Veranke, Drew's most famous foes are enemies that already belong to other franchises, such as Juggernaut, the Enchantress and Madame Hydra. Others such as the Brothers Grimm are shadows of their former selves. This is perhaps why Drew is not as popular as her male counterpart. Spider-Woman is an excellent character cursed with a subpar rogues gallery and casual fans assuming a relationship with Spider-Man (as Drew herself reminds everyone, the two have different powers and aren't related except in name). Spider-Woman's villains have the right idea in attacking their enemy together, perhaps because they believe they won't be recognized alone." Stephanie Williams of Syfy said, "Behind every great woman is an even greater friend. In the case of Carol Danvers, this friend is none other than Jessica Drew. Their friendship isn't at all one-sided, however. Jessica is great in her own right and Carol is right behind her when she needs the support. Spider-Woman and Captain Marvel are two women who were brought together by dire circumstances but instead of remaining stagnant in misery, a beautiful life-long friendship blossomed from their unthinkable pain. […] Jessica or Carol are perfect superheroines, but their love for another regardless of each of their own shortcomings is a great reflection of their loving friendship. Hopefully, we continue to get much more bestie action from Jessica and Carol in the future. Superheroes make a job out of being there for those in need, but they can always use people in their corner for support as well. It's always refreshing to see them be there for one another." Anthony Orlando of BuzzFeed stated, "Jessica Drew, aka Spider-Woman, has yet to receive the big-screen treatment she deserves. Though her origins have experienced confusing changes over the years, the main story is that she was given her superpowers before she was born and was recruited into HYDRA, fighting for the group until she discovered its true nature. Her character has recently grown more popular, and she has become a prominent member of the Avengers, making her an ideal new addition to the MCU or Sony's Spider-Verse."

Ryan Scott of SlashFilm wrote, "With the MCU showing absolutely no signs of slowing down, we recently decided to poll some fans to determine which superhero they would most like to see join the MCU down the line. While there are many options, one hero stood well above the rest of the competition, and it is a wish that may well come true down the line, if the stars align. Coming out on top of those we polled was Spider-Woman, with just over 32% of the vote. Jasmine Shanelle of The Mary Sue asserted, "In all the Spidey reboots out there, we've never been blessed with a film surrounding Spider-Woman. Sure, we got a glimpse of Gwen Stacy's Spider-Woman in an alternate universe from Spider-Man: Into the Spider-Verse, and while that movie was one of the best Spider-Man films we've been given, it was still ultimately just that—a Spider-Man film. Introducing Jessica Drew's Spider-Woman is just the shake-up the MCU needs. Not only does Drew have the same powers as Peter Parker's Spider-Man, but she's also a super spy and private investigator. Think Natasha Romanoff's Black Widow meets Jessica Jones. Drew is as strong as her male counterpart, but tactically and intellectually superior." Mark Peters of Salon.com said, "Since Marvel is now sharing Spider-Man with Sony, presumably Spider-Woman is available too. She's a character who's been an Avenger more often than Spider-Man in the comics, and she's extremely powerful, thanks to her venom blasts. She's also recently been pregnant—a rare status for a superhero. I doubt that condition would make it to the big screen, but Jessica Drew should." Rosie Knight of Nerdist stated, "The O.G. Spider-Woman, Jessica Drew, was first introduced in 1977's Marvel Spotlight #32. She was invented simply to make sure that no one else took the moniker first, but after her popularity surprised Marvel she was given an ongoing series. Jessica has an interesting origin as she was originally written as a woman who evolved from a literal spider, but that was retconned within five issues, and in current continuity she's actually a clone of Peter Parker. Her iconic red and yellow costume, flowing hair, and her own animated series have made her a fan favorite and most likely to be the first Spider-Woman to appear on screen! So if you're looking for a place to get to know her, the 2015 Spider-Woman series by Dennis Hopeless and Javier Rodriguez is a great place to start."

=== Accolades ===
- In 2009, IGN included Jessica Drew in their "Marvel's Femme Fatales" list.
- In 2011, Comics Buyer's Guide ranked Jessica Drew 54th in their "100 Sexiest Women in Comics" list.
- In 2012, IGN ranked Jessica Drew 20th in their "Top 50 Avengers" list.
- In 2013, Den of Geek included Jessica Drew in their "5 Female Marvel Superheroes Who Need Solo Films" list.
- In 2014, ComicBook.com ranked Jessica Drew's Ultimate Marvel iteration 3rd in their "7 Best Female Characters from the Spider-Man Multiverse" list.
- In 2015, Gizmodo ranked Jessica Drew 22nd in their "Every Member Of The Avengers" list.
- In 2015, Entertainment Weekly ranked Jessica Drew 25th in their "Let's rank every Avenger ever" list.
- In 2015, CNET included Jessica Drew in their "15 most powerful female superheroes" list.
- In 2015, BuzzFeed ranked Jessica Drew 16th in their "84 Avengers Members Ranked From Worst To Best" list.
- In 2016, ComicBook.com included Jessica Drew in their "7 Big Marvel Superheroes Who Haven't Appeared on Film" list.
- In 2017, Gizmodo ranked Jessica Drew 1st in their "Greatest Spider-Women of All Time" list.
- In 2017, Nerdist ranked Jessica Drew 3rd in their "7 Best Spider-Heroes Who Aren't Peter Parker" list.
- In 2017, Screen Rant ranked Jessica Drew 9th in their "28 Marvel Superheroes With Spider-Powers" list.
- In 2018, WhatCulture ranked Jessica Drew and Carol Danvers 4th in their "7 Best Friendships In Marvel Comics" list.
- In 2019, Comic Book Resources (CBR) ranked Jessica Drew 9th in their "10 Best Street Level Heroes" list.
- In 2019, Screen Rant ranked Jessica Drew 12th in their "15 Strongest Female Marvel Characters" list.
- In 2020, CBR ranked Jessica Drew 4th in their "Spider-Woman: 10 Most Powerful Characters To Bear The Name" list, 5th in their "10 Best Detectives In Marvel Comics" list, and 9th in their "10 Deadliest Female Assassins Of The Marvel Universe" list.
- In 2020, Scary Mommy included Jessica Drew in their "Looking For A Role Model? These 195+ Marvel Female Characters Are Truly Heroic" list.
- In 2021, Screen Rant ranked Jessica Drew and Carol Danvers 9th in their "10 Best Friendships In The Avengers Comic Books" list.
- In 2021, Comic Book Resources ranked Jessica Drew 12th in their "20 Most Powerful Female Members Of The Avengers" list.
- In 2022, Collider included Jessica Drew in their "Spider-Gwen's 10 Best Allies In The Comics" list.
- In 2022, Screen Rant ranked Jessica Drew 7th in their "10 Most Powerful Members Of The Lady Liberators" list and included her in their "10 Best Street-Level Heroes In Marvel Comics" list, and in their "10 Female Marvel Heroes That Should Come To The MCU" list.

== Literary reception ==
=== Volumes ===
==== Spider-Woman – 2009 ====
According to Marvel Comics, Spider-Woman #1 sold out in September 2009. According to Diamond Comics Distributors, Spider-Woman #1 was the 45th best selling comic book in September 2009.

Nick Winstead of ComicBook.com called Spider-Woman #1 "much-anticipated", stating, "This first issue is the first opportunity we've been allowed to see Jessica's deepest thoughts and feelings on her situation, and coupled with the scenes of quiet introspection are some very darkly drawn panels from Maleev, accenting the loneliness and self-imposed exile in which Drew currently finds herself. Brand's approach to her about taking the job as a sort of "alien hunter" is an intriguing new direction for her, given that her first solo series in the 1980s dealt so much with magical foes, mystery solving and encounters with costumed criminals. Brand's offer sparks Drew to take off to, of course, Madripoor, the epicenter of shady characters and criminals in the Marvel universe. […] This first issue jumps out to an impressive start, and the pacing is quick and immediate, with the reader able to be engaged throughout. Maleev's art is the perfect compliment to the narrative, and there's a great amount of tension in what Drew tells us about her current life. Perhaps her new journey will reinspire her to carve out her destiny and identity, free of any other organization's machinery." Bryan Joel of IGN gave Spider-Woman #1 a grade of 8.2 out of 10, writing, "Spider-Woman is no doubt going to gain footnote status for spearheading Marvel's motion comics initiative. But what shouldn't be forgotten about the series in ten years' time is that its first issue is surprisingly good. Brian Michael Bendis bucks his own trend of decompression in this issue, and this issue shows Spider-Woman has a good deal on its plate. The book details Jessica Drew's mental status post-Secret Invasion, a run-in with Abigail Brand and subsequent drafting into S.W.O.R.D., and deployment on her first official mission. Bendis covers a lot of ground here, even finding time to give a quick refresher on Jessica's origin along the way. It bears mentioning that the issue is well-paced, and gives each plot beat and development room to do its thing. […] Spider-Woman is off to a strong start. There's certainly room for improvement, but it's nice to know Jessica Drew isn't the next in the string of properties Marvel has given an ongoing series with minimal direction or reason."

==== Spider-Woman – 2014 ====
According to Diamond Comics Distributors, Spider-Woman #1 was the 5th best selling comic book in November 2014. Spider-Woman #1 was the 45th best selling comic book in 2014.

Chase Magnett of ComicBook.com gave Spider-Woman #1 a grade of C, asserting, "Spider-Woman #1 is an issue that starts with its hands tied behind its back. It never has an opportunity to introduce its characters or premise because it's too busy attempting to catch up with an event. However, Hopeless does an admirable job of providing a reason to care about these characters. Land's negligible contribution doesn't actively harm the story, but fails to take advantage of the ample opportunities here. Spider-Woman holds potential, but has a lot of hurdles to overcome in order to develop its own personality and appearance." Jeff Lake of IGN gave Spider-Woman #1 a grade of 5 out of 10, saying, "Spider-Woman was already facing an uphill battle, the book's infamous "butt cover" and oddly time dependent release casting a shadow over Jessica Drew's long-awaited return. Those hoping that the debut itself would alleviate such negative connotations are sure to be left disappointed, as Spider-Woman's new #1 proves uneven and ill-formed, serving as little more than a drawn out tie-in to the ongoing events of Spider-Verse. […] When all is said and done, Spider-Woman #1 isn't a true debut. As a direct tie-in to Spider-Verse it's a decent enough addition, offering Spider-folk aplenty, but if you're looking for an immersive look at a returning fan favorite, this isn't it. The book's last second shift may serve to rectify some of these aforementioned misgivings, but unless you're a lover of all things Spider-Verse, the book's current direction leaves much to be desired. Whether felled by undue expectation or confusing marketing, Spider-Woman #1 feels more like an ensemble piece than a true solo debut. Fans of the Spider-Verse event will likely find more to like, but for those excited to see Jessica Drew return to prominence, it appears we have more waiting to do yet."

==== Spider-Woman – 2015 ====
According to Diamond Comics Distributors, Spider-Woman #1 was the 37th best selling comic book in November 2015.

Chase Magnett of ComicBook.com gave Spider-Woman #1 a grade of B+, asserting, "A lot of people are going to get hung up on one aspect of Spider-Woman #1: Jessica Drew's pregnancy. It's the topic that has dominated the discussion leading up to the release of this comic and it is a significant part of the comics. Focusing purely, or even largely, on that one aspect does a disservice to the comic though. Spider-Woman #1 is a story about a woman handling her first pregnancy, but it is so much more. It is a story about friends helping one another, about altering one's career, about comedic party shenanigans, and about wild, space adventures. Spider-Woman #1 is one of the most colorful stories in the All-New, All-Different Marvel, a beautifully presented joy of a read. […] Spider-Woman #1 is one of the absolute best debuts of the All-New, All-Different Marvel line. It is an example of what a team of excellent creators can do when collaborating on a story and craft they clearly care about. The pregnancy storyline is handled very well here, but it speaks volumes about the quality of this comic that it is far from the only thing with discussing. There's a lot of great things happening in Spider-Woman, and it would be a shame for superhero fans to miss out on any of them." Jesse Schedeen of IGN gave Spider-Woman #1 a grade of 8.6 out of 10, writing, "It's nice (if not terribly surprising) to see that Rodriguez is able to juggle the outlandish on down-to-earth elements so well. The story is laid back at times and outlandish at others, and Rodriguez brings a unified look to it all. Rodriguez's page layouts stand out thanks to their variety and strong sense of design. At times he relies on smaller, grid-like layouts, while at other times the page opens up and allows Rodriguez's elegant figure-work to breathe. Rodriguez also colors this issue, and his vibrant hues do a lot to enhance the story. Whether it's the moody glow of a fire in the early pages or the eclectic hues seen in the final sequence, Rodriguez's work leaves a strong impression. Granted, the cover is a little wonky in terms Jessica's posture and proportions, but generally the figure work is much stronger inside the comic. The only thing new about this series is the status quo. But considering how little time we got to savor Dennis Hopeless and Javier Rodriguez's Spider-Woman before Secret Wars cut things short, and changes to the creative team would be a disappointment. This first issue makes the most of the book's core character dynamics as Jessica grapples with her new life as a superhero mother-to-be. This issue even opens up her world to bigger and crazier conflicts again, promising an exciting road ahead for Spider-Woman."

==== Spider-Woman – 2020 ====
According to Diamond Comics Distributors, Spider-Woman #1 was the best selling comic book in March 2020.

Joe Grunenwald of ComicsBeat stated, This series marks her first ongoing work for Marvel, and the two tales in this issue display Pacheco's deft ear for dialogue and a skill for characterization. Jess narrates both stories, and newcomers to the character will really get a sense of who she is as a result. The first story is nearly all action, while the second is more dialogue-heavy and character-driven, and Pacheco's scripting on both of them is clever and solidly entertaining. The visuals in this issue are equally strong. Pere Pérez illustrates the opening, more action-oriented tale, and he does so wonderfully. His action is dynamic and easy to follow, and his facial expressions are also spot-on, driving home the humor and the intensity of Pacheco's script. The issue's second story, illustrated by Paulo Siqueira and Oren Junior, is just as well-done, with clean lines and interesting page layouts keeping the dialogue-heavier story visually interesting. Colors by Frank D'Armata unify both stories, and he noticeably adjusts his work to match each artist/art team to great effect. The result is a visually-cohesive package that's a pleasure to take in. […] Spider-Woman #1 is an engaging and entertaining debut issue for the series. It raises several questions I'm interested in getting answers for, and it sets up Jessica Drew's new goings-on in a way that's clever, and that enhances the reading experience. This is worth checking out. Final Verdict: BUY this book if you like solid writing and art that tells an intriguing story with a fan-favorite character." Matthew Aguilar of ComicBook.com gave Spider-Woman #1 a grade of 5 out of 5, saying, "Spider-Woman's new series is finally here and it absolutely delivers. We've never seen a take on Spider-Woman quite like this, and we mean that in the best possible way. Writer Karla Pacheco brings Drew's trademark banter to the series in spades but gives it all some welcome edge, like say when she uses a jerky kid as an impromptu projectile in the middle of a fight. Spider-Woman is also made to look like the true badass she is thanks to Pere Perez and Frank D'Armata, who find inventive ways to showcase her power set throughout the issue. It should also be said that the new costume looks pretty slick in their capable hands, though we also have to mention the second story explaining the new suit. The story itself is great, providing proper context for the new suit and a compelling hook along with it, but the cheesecake style art here is going to be too much for some, looking way out of proportion to the version earlier in the book. That aside, this is one hell of a debut, and Spider-Woman couldn't be in better hands."

== Other versions ==
=== "Age of X" ===
An alternate universe version of Jessica Drew appears in "Age of X". This version is known as Redback and is a member of the Avengers, a group of mutant hunters who answer to Frank Castle. Drew later sacrifices herself to stop the Hulk from destroying a mutant sanctuary, having come to recognize that their persecution of mutants is wrong.

=== Earth-65 ===
During the 2016 Spider-Women event, Spider-Gwen's interdimensional transporter is stolen by Jessica's male Earth-65 counterpart, Jesse Drew. In this universe, Jesse is married with a son and daughter, who are unaware he is actually Agent 77 of the criminal organization S.I.L.K. It is later revealed that Jesse is the son of two S.H.I.E.L.D. astronaut spies who had been sent to the moon to live on a secret base for ten years, during which they gave birth to Jesse. However, Jesse's father was a Russian double agent who was eventually killed by Jesse's mother.

Joining S.H.I.E.L.D. after high school, Jesse was sent back to the moon to renovate the base where he and his crew were attacked by alien spider creatures. Jesse escaped, but one of the spiders poisoned him, and Jesse was saved by the head of S.I.L.K., Cindy Moon, who uses her spider formula to save his life and give him superpowers as Agent Spider. Moon deceives Jesse into thinking he needs the formula to survive, but it is later revealed that the formula merely lets him retain his powers. After learning of this, Jesse quits S.I.L.K. and leaves with his family.

=== Marvel Adventures Spider-Man ===
An alternate universe version of Jessica Drew appears in Marvel Adventures Spider-Man. This version is a freelance agent who arrived at Peter Parker's school as a substitute teacher when she discovered Peter's biology report mixed up with Hydra's bio-weapons plan. She is one of the few people who knew Peter's secret identity.

=== Marvel Zombies ===
A zombified alternate universe version of Spider-Woman appears in Marvel Zombies: Dead Days.

=== MC2 ===
In the MC2 reality, Jessica does not regain her powers after losing them. She marries and has a child Gerald (or Gerry for short). She learns that her radioactive blood caused Gerry to develop a crippling illness. She attempts to use the same genetic treatments her father gave her to save him. As Gerry "incubated" in a genetic accelerator, Jessica's husband blames her for Gerry's health and divorces her. When Gerry emerges from the genetic accelerator, Jessica learns that her son had gained spider-like powers (superhuman strength and agility as well as the ability to organically produce webs), but that his illness had not been cured.

=== What If…? ===
An alternate universe version of Jessica Drew from Earth-79101 appears in What If…? #17. This version succeeded in killing Nick Fury after the accidental death of Jared. She escaped and came back to Hydra headquarters but was pursued by S.H.I.E.L.D. Agents led by agent Valentina Allegra de Fontaine. Spider-Woman (still known as Arachne) became a supervillain who wanted to know her real origin, just like the Earth-616 version. Otto Vermis is still alive but captured by S.H.I.E.L.D. and Agent Val chase Arachne to get revenge for Fury's death.

=== Spider-Verse ===
An alternate universe version of Jessica Drew from Earth-001 appears in Spider-Verse. This version is a servant of the Inheritors and lover of Morlun.

=== Ultimate Marvel ===
The Ultimate Marvel incarnation of Jessica Drew (a composite character of Jessica and Ben Reilly), known primarily as Spider-Woman and the Black Widow for a time, as well as by the alias of Julia Carpenter, has been an agent of S.H.I.E.L.D., a member of the Ultimates and New Ultimates, and a supporting character for both Peter Parker and Miles Morales. A clone of the former with all of his memories and personality, she has heightened agility, strength, reflexes, a precognitive danger sense (spider sense), the ability to stick to walls, and organic webbing she can shoot from her fingertips.

== In other media ==
=== Television ===
Jessica Drew / Spider-Woman appears in a self-titled television series, voiced by Joan Van Ark.

=== Film ===
Jess Drew / Spider-Woman appears in Spider-Man: Across the Spider-Verse (2023), voiced by Issa Rae. Described as an "original creation" and "wholesale reinvention of the concept" of the comic book Jessica Drew, this version is an African American Spider-Woman who rides a motorcycle and serves as a leading member of Miguel O'Hara's Spider-Society and mentor to Gwen Stacy / Spider-Woman. A composite character of the Earth-616 and Earth-1610 Jessica Drews and the first Spider-Woman Valerie the Librarian, she has the spider-powers and fingertip-webs of 1610-Jessica from Ultimate Spider-Man, the pregnancy of 616-Jessica from Spider-Woman: Shifting Gears, and the afro and mask of Valerie from Spidey Super Stories. Furthermore, alternate universe comic book-accurate incarnations of the Earth-616 and Earth-1610 versions of Jessica Drew make background cameo appearances as additional members of the Spider-Society.

- Jess Drew / Spider-Woman from the film returned in the comic-book series Spider-Society: Enter...The Spider-Versers (2024) and Spider-Verse vs. Venomverse (2025), explicitly identified as the same iteration of the character voiced by Rae in the animated films.
- Jess Drew / Spider-Woman will appear in a Spider-Woman spin-off film focused on Gwen Stacy.

=== Video games ===
- Jessica Drew / Spider-Woman appears as a playable character in Marvel Ultimate Alliance, voiced by Tasia Valenza. This version is a member of the New Avengers who lacks super-strength.
- Jessica Drew / Spider-Woman appears as a boss and assist character in the PlayStation 2 and PlayStation Portable versions of Spider-Man: Web of Shadows, voiced by Mary Elizabeth McGlynn.
- Jessica Drew / Spider-Woman appears in Marvel Ultimate Alliance 2, voiced by E. G. Daily. This version is allied with the Anti-Registration movement and assists players before being captured by S.H.I.E.L.D. agents. She also serves as a boss for the Pro-Registration campaign.
- Jessica Drew / Spider-Woman appears as an unlockable playable character in Marvel Super Hero Squad Online, voiced by Grey DeLisle.
- Jessica Drew / Spider-Woman appears as an unlockable playable character in Marvel Avengers Alliance. She later appears as one of the Serpent's Worthy, Kuurth, Breaker of Stones.
- Jessica Drew / Spider-Woman appears as an unlockable playable character in Marvel Heroes.
- Jessica Drew / Spider-Woman appears as an unlockable playable character in Lego Marvel Super Heroes, voiced by Kari Wahlgren.
- Multiple incarnations of Jessica Drew appear as unlockable playable characters in Spider-Man Unlimited, voiced by Laura Bailey.
- Jessica Drew / Spider-Woman appears in Marvel Pinball, as part of the "Women of Power" DLC pack and the A-Force table.
- Jessica Drew / Spider-Woman appears as an unlockable playable character in Marvel Avengers Academy, voiced by Kiernan Shipka.
- Jessica Drew / Spider-Woman appears as an unlockable playable character in Marvel: Avengers Alliance 2.
- Jessica Drew / Spider-Woman appears as an unlockable playable character in Marvel Puzzle Quest.
- Jessica Drew / Spider-Woman appears an unlockable playable character in Marvel: Future Fight.
- Jessica Drew / Spider-Woman appears in Marvel Snap.
- Jessica Drew / Spider-Woman appears in Marvel Strike Force as a highly versatile Bio Blaster belonging to the A-Force team
- Jessica Drew / Spider-Woman appeared as a player skin in Chapter 5, Season 4 of Fortnite, unlockable through micro-transactions.

=== Miscellaneous ===
- Jessica Drew / Spider-Woman appears in the Spider-Woman: Agent of S.W.O.R.D. motion comic, modelled by Jolynn Carpenter and voiced by Nicolette Reed.
- Jessica Drew / Spider-Woman appears in the Wolverine: Weapon X motion comic, voiced by Lisa Ann Beley.

== Collected editions ==
| Title | Material collected | Publication date | ISBN |
Vol. 1
| Essential Spider-Woman Vol. 1 | Marvel Spotlight #32, Marvel Two-In-One #29–33, Spider-Woman (vol. 1) #1–25 | December 21, 2005 | 978-0785117933 |
| Essential Spider-Woman Vol. 2 | Spider-Woman (vol. 1) #26–50, Marvel Team-Up #97, Uncanny X-Men #148 | August 8, 2007 | 978-0785127017 |
| Marvel Masterworks: Spider-Woman Vol. 1 | Marvel Spotlight #32, Marvel Two-In-One #29–33, Spider-Woman (vol. 1) #1–8 | November 24, 2015 | 978-0785191780 |
| Marvel Masterworks: Spider-Woman Vol. 2 | Spider-Woman (vol. 1) #9–25 | February 16, 2021 | 978-1302927363 |
| Marvel Masterworks: Spider-Woman Vol. 3 | Spider-Woman (vol. 1) #26–38 | December 20, 2022 | 978-1302946692 |
| Marvel Masterworks: Spider-Woman Vol. 4 | Spider-Woman (vol. 1) #39–50, Avengers (vol. 1) #240–241, Annual #10 | March 19, 2024 | 978-1302955113 |
Vol. 4 by Brian Michael Bendis
| Spider-Woman: Agent of S.W.O.R.D. | Spider-Woman (vol. 4) #1–7 | March 2, 2011 | 978-0785126300 |
Vol. 5 and 6 by Dennis Hopeless
| Spider-Woman Vol. 1: Spider-Verse | Spider-Woman (vol. 5) #1–4 | June 30, 2015 | 978-0785154587 |
| Spider-Woman Vol. 2: New Duds | Spider-Woman (vol. 5) #5–10 | February 9, 2016 | 978-0785154594 |
| Spider-Woman: Shifting Gears Vol. 1: Baby Talk | Spider-Woman (vol. 6) #1–5, material from Amazing Spider-Man (vol. 4) #1 | June 14, 2016 | 978-0785196228 |
| Spider-Women | Spider-Woman (vol. 6) #6–7, Silk (vol. 2) #7–8, Spider-Gwen (vol. 2) #7–8 | July 26, 2016 | 978-1302900939 |
| Spider-Woman: Shifting Gears Vol. 2: Civil War II | Spider-Woman (vol. 6) #8–12 | January 10, 2017 | 978-0785196235 |
| Spider-Woman: Shifting Gears Vol. 3: Scare Tactics | Spider-Woman (vol. 6) #13–17 | June 13, 2017 | 978-1302903305 |
| Spider-Woman by Dennis Hopeless | Spider-Woman (vol. 5) #1–10, Spider-Woman (vol. 6) #1–5, 8–17, material from Amazing Spider-Man (vol. 4) #1 | June 6, 2023 | 978-1302950040 |
Vol. 7 by Karla Pacheco
| Spider-Woman Vol. 1: Bad Blood | Spider-Woman (vol. 7) #1–5 | January 13, 2021 | 978-1302921866 |
| Spider-Woman Vol. 2: King in Black | Spider-Woman (vol. 7) #6–10 | June 15, 2021 | 978-1302927523 |
| Spider-Woman Vol. 3: Back to Basics | Spider-Woman (vol. 7) #11–16 | January 18, 2022 | 978-1302929053 |
| Spider-Woman Vol. 4: Devil's Reign | Spider-Woman (vol. 7) #17–21 | May 24, 2022 | 978-1302934644 |
| Spider-Woman by Pacheco & Perez | Spider-Woman (vol. 7) #1–21 | February 13, 2024 | 978-1302955748 |
Vol. 8 by Steve Foxe
| Spider-Woman Vol. 1: Gang War | Spider-Woman (vol. 8) #1–5, material from Amazing Spider-Man (vol. 6) #31 | July 2, 2024 | 978-1302957131 |
| Spider-Woman Vol. 2: The New Champions | Spider-Woman (vol. 8) #6–10 | December 3, 2024 | 978-1302958886 |
Miniseries and One Shots
| Spider-Woman: Origin | Spider-Woman: Origin #1–5 | August 30, 2006 | 978-0785119654 |
| The Amazing Spider-Man: Spider Island Companion | Spider-Island: Spider-Woman #1 and Spider-Island: The Amazing Spider-Girl #1–3, Spider-Island: Cloak & Dagger #1–3, Spider-Island: Deadly Hands of Kung Fu #1–3, Herc #7–8, Spider-Island: Avengers #1, Black Panther #524, Spider-Island: Heroes for Hire #1, Spider-Island Spotlight #1 | February 29, 2012 | 978-0785162285 |
| New Avengers by Brian Michael Bendis: The Complete Collection Vol. 2 | Giant-Size Spider-Woman #1 and New Avengers #11–25, New Avengers Annual #1, New Avengers: Illuminati, Civil War: The Confession, New Avengers Customer 676: Army & Air Force | February 16, 2017 | 978-1302903633 |

== See also ==
- Julia Carpenter/Spider-Woman/Arachne/Madame Web
- Mattie Franklin/Spider-Woman
- Gwen Stacy/Spider-Woman
