= Motion comic =

Form of animation

Motion comic presented in the series The Marvel Super Heroes

A motion comic or animated comic, is a form of animation combining elements of print comic books and animation. Individual panels are expanded into a full shot while sound effects, voice acting, music, and animation are added to the original artwork. Text boxes, speech bubbles and the onomatopoeia are typically removed to feature more of the original artwork being animated. Motion comics are often released as short serials covering a story arc of a long running series or animating a single release of a graphic novel. Single release issues of a story arc are converted into ten- to twenty-minute-long episodes depending on content.

== History ==
The concept was fully outlined in the mid-1960s by science fiction author Philip K. Dick in his novel The Zap Gun, an expansion of his novella Project Plowshare, which was written in 1964 and first published as a serial in the November 1965 and January 1966 issues of Worlds of Tomorrow magazine. In Dick's novel, weapons designers of the future are mediums, who create their new designs in trance states. The weapon designs are extracted telepathically from a motion comic book, The Blue Cephalopod Man from Titan, created by mad Italian artist Oral Giacomini. Dick describes both the storyline and the animated panels of this comic book in detail.

In the mid 1960s, Marvel Comics Animation used the technique for the television show The Marvel Super Heroes. Actual artwork from the originally published comic books was augmented by voices, music, and a small amount of animation. The term "motion comic" did not exist yet.

In 1982, the comic strip Jane was made into a TV series by BBC. It featured brief sequences of a stylized approach to comic panels, partly done with animation, partly with actors in a drawn environment via chroma key.

In 2005, Lionsgate released an animated version of the Saw: Rebirth comic, one of the first examples of an animated comic created to tie into a film franchise. The first major motion comics released, which is also the first use of the term "motion comic", were released by Warner Bros., the owner of DC Comics to coincide with the film premieres of The Dark Knight and Watchmen, releasing an adaptation of The Batman Adventures: Mad Love and Watchmen: Motion Comic, adapting the comic book of the same name. In 2010 a motion comic called Inception: The Cobol Job was released as prequel and prologue to the film Inception. In 2012 a prequel motion comic of the film Dredd was made to show the origins of the film's main antagonist, Ma-Ma.

Marvel Comics has released motion comics using a company owned by Neal Adams. The first release was an adaptation of Joss Whedon and John Cassaday's Astonishing X-Men: "Gifted". Other adaptations include Spider-Woman: "Agent of S.W.O.R.D.", Iron Man: "Extremis", Black Panther, Thor/Loki: Blood Brothers, Inhumans and Astonishing X-Men: "Dangerous".

Examples from other companies include Peanuts Motion Comics, Zits Motion Comics, the Dead Space prequel comics and the "Lucy" element of the ABC News documentary Earth 2100.

Another example would be a four-part motion comic based on the Uncharted video game series as a prequel called Eye of Indra, released for the PlayStation Network.

=== Illustrated films ===
A sibling format to motion comics called illustrated films was developed by transmedia studio HALO 8 Entertainment with their Godkiller, which was produced at the same time as (but separately from) the Watchmen motion comic. As opposed to repurposing an existing comic book, Halo-8 created new sequential art that was designed from its inception to be transmedia art for both a comic book and an illustrated film. Godkiller creator Matt Pizzolo told Bloody Disgusting that "Godkiller was just a slower production than Watchmen because we had to create 200 pages of art and story from the ground up first, rather than starting with one of the greatest comic books ever made as source material. Plus we had a dozen voice performers instead of just one".

Although aesthetically similar to motion comics, Pizzolo identifies illustrated film influences as including Liquid Television, the MTV cartoon adaptation of The Maxx, the Berserk anime series, Chris Marker's La Jetée, the motion comic Broken Saints, and the experimental cinema of Ralph Bakshi.

According to ComicsAlliance, Pizzolo stated "the difference between an illustrated film and a motion comic is kind of the difference between a movie that was shot in 3D versus a movie that was shot in 2D but got a 3D post-conversion. We're not repurposing an existing comic book here, we're building something unique from scratch".

The 75-minute Godkiller feature was released theatrically in 11 cities before it was distributed on DVD and cable VOD.

Other illustrated films from Halo-8 include Ben Templesmith's original project Black Sky and an adaptation of Tim Seeley's Hack/Slash, but those projects are currently in development limbo.

== Reception ==
Artist John Cassaday described his experience with the motion comic adaptation of Astonishing X-Men in an interview with Comic Book Resources:

I'd seen some motion comic animation, and the quality varied. When Marvel approached me, I was initially hesitant, but after looking at some test footage and hearing how committed they were, I knew what direction they were wanting to go.

== Comparison to visual novels ==
The visual novel, a form of interactive fiction largely created in Japan (and also constituting the majority of PC games sold in the country), makes similar usage of animated transitions between still graphic images for narrative purposes. Visual novels, which have been released since the 1980s, also make use of background music and voice talents in order to help drive the narrative.

Unlike most Western motion comics:

- Visual novels only occasionally make use of motion in-scene (i.e., a body part moving inside an otherwise-static scene).
- Visual novels, while making use of voice talents, also provide dialogue through dialogue boxes, usually superimposed on the bottom of the screen.
- Visual novel characters are usually depicted through graphic sprites superimposed upon a generic background; more detailed character designs and backgrounds are typically reserved for key scenes and events in the narrative.
- The majority of visual novels are original properties and are adapted for, rather than adaptations of, manga or anime.
- Visual novels can either be little more than interactive films or much more interactive adventure games, with the dialog boxes containing controls for interaction with the game.
- Visual novels are also typically written from the first-person narrative.
- Most visual novels have dialogue choices, branching storylines, and multiple endings.

The visual novel franchise Danganronpa uses motion manga as a gameplay element at the climax of each chapter, with a brief reoccurrence in the Danganronpa 3: The End of Hope's Peak High School anime.

== List of motion comics projects ==
- Watchmen: Motion Comic (2008)
- Batman Black and White Motion Comic (2008)
- Astonishing X-Men (2009)
- Batgirl: Year One (2009)
- Superman: Red Son (2009)
- Spider-Woman (2009)
- Jonah Hex (2010)
- Black Panther (2010)
- Buffy the Vampire Slayer (2010)
