= Veranke =

- Veranke as the Skrull Queen.

Publication information
- Publisher: Marvel Comics
- First appearance: New Avengers #1 (January 2005; as Spider-Woman); New Avengers #40 (June 2008; as Veranke)
- Created by: Brian Michael Bendis (writer); Jim Cheung (artist)

In-story information
- Alter ego: Veranke
- Species: Skrull
- Place of origin: Tyeranx Seven Province
- Team affiliations: Skrull Empire; Avengers; Mighty Avengers; New Avengers; S.H.I.E.L.D.; Hydra
- Notable aliases: Skrull Queen, Jessica Drew / Spider-Woman, Skrull Empress, Silver Scorpion, Carol Danvers
- Abilities: Shapeshifting; Spider-Woman's powers

Veranke is a supervillain appearing in American comic books published by Marvel Comics. The queen of the Skrull empire, first introduced under the guise of Spider-Woman (Jessica Drew), she is the main antagonist of Secret Invasion in which she leads her empire to invade and conquer Earth.

== Publication history ==
Veranke's first official appearance is in Secret Invasion #1, but was disguised as "Spider-Woman" in New Avengers #1 while her character is named and fleshed out in New Avengers #40.

== Fictional character biography ==
Veranke is a Skrull princess who scolded Emperor Dorrek VII from the Tyeranx 7 province after the Illuminati escape from the Skrull palace. They had ignored a prophecy stating that the attack upon the palace will be followed by the destruction of the Skrull homeworld. Veranke declares that if Dorrek VII is unable to heed the writings of the Skrull's scriptures and the Skrull people's will, then he is not fit to rule. For her defiance, Dorrek VII banishes Veranke to another planet.

Veranke in exile.

Years later, the Skrull throneworld is destroyed by Galactus; believing that only Veranke can lead them, the Skrulls rescue her from exile and she becomes their queen. The Skrulls, seeking a new planet to live on, undergo a major operation to infiltrate Earth and prepare for an invasion. To set an example for her people, Veranke also decides to participate in the invasion, impersonating Jessica Drew / Spider-Woman.

After successfully assuming Spider-Woman's identity, Veranke takes up the latter's new position at the Raft and is stationed there when Electro enables a mass prison break. This event leads to the formation of the New Avengers, which Veranke goes on to join. Spider-Woman had been working as a double agent for Nick Fury; in her guise as Spider-Woman, Veranke works for Fury as a personal agent within the New Avengers, S.H.I.E.L.D. and Hydra simultaneously.

=== House of M ===
Following the House of M storyline, Veranke learns that the Skrull empire has been devastated by the Annihilation Wave, killing billions of Skrulls. Distressed by the realization that they are now all that is left of the empire's legions, Veranke and her agents are more determined to continue their takeover of Earth.

=== Civil War ===
Soon after Peter Parker / Spider-Man's identity is revealed to the world during the Civil War storyline, Iron Man discloses Veranke's triple agent status to Maria Hill. Troubled by her potentially treasonous allegiance to Fury, Hill orders her apprehension. While disguised as Sybil Dvorak, she is captured and taken aboard a S.H.I.E.L.D. Helicarrier. Deploying an EMP, a Hydra commando team disables the Helicarrier and rescues her. She makes her way to the hidden base of Captain America's Secret Avengers and pleads to join the resistance, having lost her connection to S.H.I.E.L.D. and Fury.

Afterwards, Veranke travels alongside the New Avengers to Tokyo to fight Elektra and the Hand, but is unable to prevent Echo from killing the Skrull Pagon, which reveals the Skrull infiltration. As the New Avengers ponder their next move, Veranke defeats the Skrull posing as Wolverine to sow distrust amongst the superhero community.

=== Secret Invasion ===
Veranke as Jessica Drew. Art by Leinil Francis Yu.

In the Secret Invasion storyline, Veranke attacks Echo after the Skrull invasion of Earth begins. She then insinuates Iron Man is a Skrull sleeper agent, and kisses Iron Man for supposedly having "earned the queen's love". Black Widow plans to attack while Veranke talks to Iron Man, but is distracted by Skrulls posing as Beast and Jean Grey. Veranke escapes while Black Widow kills the Skrulls.

Veranke arrives at Camp Hammond, where she is attacked by the Shadow Initiative. She leads an army of Super-Skrulls against the superhumans of Earth, including the New Avengers, the Mighty Avengers, the Young Avengers, the Initiative, the Hood's crew and the Thunderbolts all assemble. During the fight, Veranke is stabbed in the shoulder by Wolverine and shot in the face by Ronin. She survives the attack, but is killed by Norman Osborn.

The "Devil's Reign" storyline reveals that Veranke's body had been secretly preserved following her death. She is revived and set loose by Mayor Wilson Fisk to get revenge on Spider-Woman.

== Powers and abilities ==
Like all Skrulls of Deviant heritage, Veranke is capable of shape-shifting her form into whatever she chooses, be it humanoid, non-humanoid, or even inorganic. Unspecified developments in genetic engineering within the Skrull race has allowed the Skrulls (including Veranke) to go undetected in human form from Iron Man's technological scans, Charles Xavier's mental scans, Spider-Man's Spider-Sense, Wolverine's animal senses, and Doctor Strange's magic. Veranke's shape-shifting abilities also allow her to form weapons such as blades on her body. Veranke also has a great deal of knowledge concerning Skrull prophecies.

She displayed Spider-Woman's powers which include superhuman physical abilities, flight, and the ability to generate electricity and pheromones.

As Jessica Drew, she initially had only limited gliding ability, enhanced by the small wings that are part of her Spider-Woman costume. Hydra further tampered with her metabolism, providing her with self-powered flight. The range of her flying capabilities is still undetermined. She displayed powers that helped her and the other Avengers escape from Doctor Doom's technological device by creating a Venom blast explosion — this use of Spider-Woman's powers was noted as inconsistent with her files on S.H.I.E.L.D.

== In other media ==
- Veranke appears in The Avengers: Earth's Mightiest Heroes, voiced by Elizabeth Daily.
- Veranke / Spider-Woman appears as a playable character in Marvel Avengers: Battle for Earth, voiced by Mary Elizabeth McGlynn.
