= Secret Invasion =

2008 Marvel Comics event

- Variant cover of Secret Invasion 1 (June 2008), art by Steve McNiven
- Publisher: Marvel Comics
- Publication date: June 2008 – Jan. 2009
- Genre: Superhero; Crossover
Title(s)
Avengers: The Initiative #14-19 Annual 01
Black Panther vol. 4, #39-41
Captain Britain and MI: 13 #1-4
Captain Marvel vol. 6, #2-5
Deadpool vol. 4, #1-3
Guardians of the Galaxy vol. 2, #4-6
Incredible Hercules #117-120
Iron Man: Director of S.H.I.E.L.D. #33-35
The Mighty Avengers #7-8,12-20
Ms. Marvel vol. 2, #25-31
New Avengers #38-47
New Avengers: Illuminati #5
New Warriors vol. 5, #14-15
Nova vol. 4, #16-18
Punisher War Journal vol . 2, #24-25
Secret Invasion #1-8
Secret Invasion #1 Director's Cut
Secret Invasion Aftermath: Beta Ray Bill - The Green of Eden #1
Secret Invasion: The Amazing Spider-Man #1-3
Secret Invasion: Dark Reign #1
Secret Invasion: Fantastic Four #1-3
Secret Invasion: Front Line #1-5
Secret Invasion: Home Invasion #1(Digital)
Secret Invasion: Inhumans #1-4
Secret Invasion: Requiem #1
Secret Invasion: Runaways/Young Avengers #1-3
Secret Invasion Saga
Secret Invasion: Thor #1-3
Secret Invasion: War of Kings #1
Secret Invasion: Who Do You Trust? #1
Secret Invasion: X-Men #1-4
She-Hulk vol. 2, #31-33
Skrulls! #1
Thunderbolts vol. 2, #122-125
X-Factor vol. 3, #33-34
- Main character(s): New Avengers; The Mighty Avengers; Fantastic Four; X-Men; Nick Fury; The Initiative; Thunderbolts; Inhumans; The Skrulls; Skrull Kill Krew; Hood's Crime Syndicate; Norman Osborn; Marvel Boy (Noh Varr)

Creative team
- Writer: Brian Michael Bendis
- Penciller: Leinil Francis Yu
- Inker: Mark Morales
- Colorist: Laura Martin
- The Infiltration: ISBN 0-7851-3231-7
- Secret Invasion: ISBN 0-7851-3297-X
- Captain Marvel: ISBN 0-7851-3303-8
- Incredible Hercules: ISBN 0-7851-3333-X

"Secret Invasion" is a comic book crossover storyline written by Brian Michael Bendis and illustrated by Leinil Francis Yu, that ran through a self-titled eight-issue limited series and several tie-in books published by Marvel Comics from April through December 2008. The story involves a subversive, long-term invasion of Earth by the Skrulls, a group of alien shapeshifters who have secretly replaced many superheroes in the Marvel Universe with impostors over a period of years, prior to the overt invasion. Marvel's promotional tagline for the event was "Who do you trust?".

A six-episode television miniseries of the same name, loosely based on the storyline and produced by Marvel Studios as part of the Marvel Cinematic Universe (MCU) debuted in June 2023 on Disney+.

== Production and marketing ==
Writer Brian Michael Bendis stated in interviews that the motivation for the invasion is the destruction of the Skrull Empire in the 2007 "Annihilation" storyline. Bendis said the Skrulls believe Earth "is religiously and rightfully theirs," and that there are hints as to the plot placed in the limited series Secret War and the title New Avengers from the first issue. The limited series concluded the plot and was, according to Bendis, "a hell of an end."

In November 2007, several ongoing titles and mini-series were branded as tie-ins to the main Secret Invasion storyline, with the tagline: Secret Invasion: The Infiltration. In addition to the core story, the Avengers titles provided additional plot material and acted as a link between titles. Other Marvel titles also featured variant covers with the characters depicted as Skrulls. Bendis stated that the series would not deal with the origins of the invasion, but is conceived from the following perspective: "If there's a character on the team who's a Skrull, we will rewind from when they got on that team, or from before they got on that team, so when they are infiltrated, how they became who they became and the effects of their actions from their 'point of view' is shown."

The Marvel website featured two online-exclusive e-comics for the event, titled Secret Invasion Prologue (a seven-page comic that reveals the replacement of a previously unknown Skrull agent) and Secret Invasion: Home Invasion (a MySpace video blog featuring a young teenager named Kinsey Walden and her fears regarding her brother's strange behavior), supported by comic pages by writer Ivan Brandon and artist Nick Postic.

== Plot ==
After the Kree–Skrull War the Earth superheroes Iron Man, Mister Fantastic, Namor, Black Bolt, Professor Charles Xavier and Doctor Strange join as a group called the Illuminati to secretly confront the Skrulls. They attack the Skrull Empire, and warn that any future invasion attempts of Earth would mean further reprisals; however, they are all captured and intensely studied before escaping.

An eventual successor to the Skrull throne, Princess Veranke, claims that a prophecy foretold the annihilation of the Skrull homeworld. The current Emperor, Dorrek, exiles her to a prison world for inciting religious extremism. After the destruction of the Skrull Throneworld by the cosmic entity Galactus, Veranke becomes Empress by lineage, and guides an invasion of Earth, armed with the knowledge of superhumans gained from having studied the Illuminati. The Skrulls capture several superhumans and infiltrate Earth's defenses, with Veranke herself posing as heroine Spider-Woman. Veranke is inconvenienced when there is a breakout of supervillains at the Raft prison, which forces her to join the New Avengers team.

After the Civil War, Elektra, the leader of the ninja group the Hand, is revealed to be a Skrull imposter named Pagon after dying in battle with the New Avengers. Veranke takes the corpse to Tony Stark (who, at the time, led the pro-registration Mighty Avengers) to sow distrust among the superhero community. She joins the Mighty Avengers, claiming it will throw the Skrulls off balance. Posing as agents of spy organization S.H.I.E.L.D., the Skrulls attempt to mine the metal vibranium in the Savage Land and battle the New Avengers before being killed. The Illuminati battle an impostor posing as Black Bolt and two new Super-Skrulls, possessing all-new powers.

The Skrull invasion destabilizes the superhuman community as:

- Simultaneous strikes disable the S.H.I.E.L.D. Helicarrier and orbiting base The Peak.
- A breakout is instigated at the Raft.
- The Baxter Building (headquarters of the Fantastic Four) is transported to the Negative Zone.
- Thunderbolt Mountain (headquarters of the Thunderbolts) is attacked.

Additionally, the Avengers are attacked by Skrulls posing as heroes in the Savage Land, and Reed Richards is wounded by the Skrull Criti Noll (who was posing as Hank Pym) seconds after determining a way to identify the shape shifters.

After several battles between Earth's heroes and the Skrulls in Manhattan and the Savage Land, Mr. Fantastic manages to develop a device that can detect the aliens. Criminal kingpin the Hood aids the heroes, deciding "no more Earth is bad for business." Veranke regroups with her forces in New York City in a final battle against the combined Avengers, now aided by Nick Fury and his new Commandos, Thor, Daredevil, Ka-Zar, and super teams such as the Young Avengers and the Thunderbolts.

Veranke is wounded by the Avenger Hawkeye. Criti Noll activates a booby trap placed on the heroine Wasp, although the blast is contained by Thor at the cost of her life. Veranke is then shot and killed by Norman Osborn (using a weapon he created with intelligence stolen from Deadpool). The last remnants of the Skrull armada are destroyed, with Iron Man locating the missing heroes. S.H.I.E.L.D. is dissolved by an executive order of the President of the United States, while a last Skrull (posing as the Avengers' butler Edwin Jarvis) flees after kidnapping Danielle Cage. This Skrull is killed by Bullseye shortly after returning the child. Norman Osborn is placed in charge of S.H.I.E.L.D's replacement, H.A.M.M.E.R., and forms a secret group consisting of himself, Emma Frost, Namor, Doctor Doom, The Hood and Loki which commences the "Dark Reign" storyline.

== Reception ==
According to Comic Book Roundup, the core series has an average score of 6.9 out of 10, based on 79 critic reviews.

Issue #1 was not very well received despite critics noting its "strong introduction to the story, good pacing, and "slick" art style", although some concerns were raised over Bendis' dialogue. Sales estimates suggested that around 250,200 copies were sold, more than twice as much as the second highest seller. The Secret Invasion: The Infiltration collected volume also topped the trade paperback chart, with an estimated 7,247 sales. The second issue kept the top slot, with estimated sales dropping to 200,344.

== Tie-in issues ==
=== Secret Invasion: The Infiltration ===
The following issues were released with The Infiltration banner prior to the launch of the Secret Invasion series:

- Avengers: The Initiative Annual #1
- Captain Marvel vol. 6, #4-5
- The Mighty Avengers #7
- Ms. Marvel vol. 2, #25-27
- New Avengers #38-39
- New Avengers: Illuminati #5
- Franklin Richards Not-So-Secret Invasion
- Marvel Spotlight Secret Invasion
- Secret Invasion Saga
- Secret Invasion Home Invasion

=== Secret Invasion ===
The following issues tie-in to the Secret Invasion mini-series:

- Avengers: The Initiative #14-19
- Black Panther vol. 4, #39-41
- Captain Britain and MI: 13 #1-4
- Deadpool (Vol. 4) #1-3
- Guardians of the Galaxy vol. 2, #4-6
- Incredible Hercules #117-120
- Iron Man: Director of S.H.I.E.L.D. #33-35
- Marvel Spotlight: Secret Invasion Saga #1
- The Mighty Avengers #12-20
- Ms. Marvel vol. 2, #28-30
- New Avengers #40-47
- New Warriors vol. 4, #14-15
- Nova vol. 4, #16-18
- Punisher War Journal #24-25
- Secret Invasion: The Amazing Spider-Man #1-3
- Secret Invasion: Aftermath Beta Ray Bill: The Green of Eden (one-shot)
- Secret Invasion: Dark Reign (One-Shot)
- Secret Invasion: Fantastic Four #1-3
- Secret Invasion: Front Line #1-5
- Secret Invasion: Inhumans #1-4
- Secret Invasion: Requiem #1
- Secret Invasion: Runaways/Young Avengers #1-3
- Secret Invasion: Thor #1-3
- Secret Invasion: War Of Kings (One-Shot)
- Secret Invasion: Who Do You Trust? (One-Shot)
- Secret Invasion: X-Men #1-4
- She-Hulk vol. 2, #31-33
- Skrulls! (one-shot)
- Thunderbolts #122-125
- X-Factor vol. 3, #33-34

== Collected editions ==
The stories are collected in volumes:

| Title | Material collected | ISBN |
|---|---|---|
| Secret Invasion: The Infiltration | Fantastic Four #2, New Avengers: Illuminati #1 and 5, New Avengers #31-32 and 38-39, Mighty Avengers #7, Avengers: The Initiative Annual #1 | 0-7851-3231-7 |
| Secret Invasion | Secret Invasion #1-8 | 0-7851-3297-X |
| Secret Invasion: Home Invasion | Secret Invasion: Home Invasion #1-8 | 978-0-7851-3557-9 |
| Secret Invasion: Front Line | Secret Invasion: Front Line #1-5 | 0-7851-3377-1 |
| Secret Invasion: Who Do You Trust? | Secret Invasion: Who Do You Trust?, Secret Invasion Saga, Skrulls!, Marvel Spotlight: Secret Invasion | 0-7851-3409-3 |
| Secret Invasion: Amazing Spider-Man | Secret Invasion: The Amazing Spider-Man 1-3, Amazing Spider-Man Annual 2008 | 0-7851-3270-8 |
| Avengers: The Initiative Volume 3: Secret Invasion | Avengers: The Initiative #14-19 | 0-7851-3150-7 |
| Black Panther: Secret Invasion | Black Panther #39-41 | 0-7851-3397-6 |
| Captain Britain and MI13 Volume 1: Secret Invasion | Captain Britain and MI13 #1-4 | 0-7851-3344-5 |
| Captain Marvel: Secret Invasion | Captain Marvel #1-5, Civil War: The Return | 0-7851-3303-8 |
| Deadpool Volume 1: Secret Invasion | Deadpool #1-5 | 0-7851-3273-2 |
| Secret Invasion: Fantastic Four | Secret Invasion: Fantastic Four #1-3, Fantastic Four #300 and 357 | 0-7851-3247-3 |
| Incredible Hercules: Secret Invasion | Incredible Hercules #116-120 | 0-7851-3333-X |
| Secret Invasion: Inhumans | Secret Invasion: Inhumans #1-4 | 0-7851-3248-1 |
| Mighty Avengers Volume 3: Secret Invasion, Book 1 | Mighty Avengers #12-15 | 0-7851-3009-8 |
| Mighty Avengers Volume 4: Secret Invasion, Book 2 | Mighty Avengers #16-20 | 0-7851-3649-5 |
| Ms Marvel Volume 5: Secret Invasion | Ms Marvel #25-30 | 0-7851-3019-5 |
| New Avengers Volume 8: Secret Invasion, Book 1 | New Avengers #38-42 | 0-7851-2946-4 |
| New Avengers Volume 9: Secret Invasion, Book 2 | New Avengers #43-47 | 0-7851-2948-0 |
| Secret Invasion: New Warriors | New Warriors #14-20 | 978-0-7851-3176-2 |
| Nova Volume 3: Secret Invasion | Nova #13-18 | 0-7851-2662-7 |
| Punisher War Journal Volume 5: Secret Invasion | Punisher War Journal #24-26 and Annual #1 | 0-7851-3148-5 |
| Secret Invasion: Runaways/Young Avengers | Secret Invasion: Runaways/Young Avengers #1-3 | 0-7851-3266-X |
| Secret Invasion: Thor | Secret Invasion: Thor #1-3, Thor #142 | 0-7851-3426-3 |
| She Hulk Volume 8: Secret Invasion | She-Hulk #31-33, X-Factor #34-35 | 0-7851-3180-9 |
| Thunderbolts Volume 3: Secret Invasion | Thunderbolts #122-125, Breaking Point, International Incident, Reason in Madness | 0-7851-2394-6 |
| Secret Invasion: War Machine | Iron Man: Director of S.H.I.E.L.D. #33-35, Iron Man #144 | 0-7851-3455-7 |
| X-Factor Volume 6: Secret Invasion | X-Factor #33-38, She-Hulk #31 | 0-7851-2865-4 |
| Secret Invasion: X-Men | Secret Invasion: X-Men #1-4 | 0-7851-3343-7 |

== Other versions ==
=== Earth-3290 ===
In this reality, Earth surrendered to the Skrulls.

=== What If? ===
An issue of What If revolves around the Secret Invasion with two stories.

In the first story, the Skrulls successfully take over Earth and begin converting humans into Skrulls. The remaining Avengers continue to oppose the Skrulls, but are viewed as terrorists by the rest of the world. Meanwhile, Queen Veranke's consort Norman Osborn tells her that it would be best to attack the Avengers in Wakanda, where they are currently hiding. Wolverine has brought one last remaining sample of the modified Legacy Virus to use against the Skrulls, removing their shapeshifting abilities. When the cannon meant to release the virus is destroyed, Thor uses his powers to spread it across Earth, inadvertently killing every Skrull and converted human. Osborn explains that the events were an elaborate ruse to get what he wants. Due to Iron Man's alcoholism, Spider-Man helped him infiltrate Wakanda to help them but he did not expect that Osborn would cross the line. Osborn admits that he did create a cure for the virus, so that he could survive and get back at the Skrulls for using him. Enraged, Captain America beheads Osborn with his shield. The Avengers surrender to the United Nations forces sent to arrest them.

The second story asks what would happen if the Secret Invasion remained secret. Norman Osborn is shown wondering what would happen if he was in charge of national security. Already on this Earth, Captain America has been pardoned for his role in the Civil War and is seen shaking hands with the Red Skull. Hours later, Norman Osborn and the Thunderbolts are dispatched to investigate a situation in the Savage Land. They infiltrate a mysterious structure full of duplicates of superhumans. The Thunderbolts attempt to fight through, only for them all to be massacred and Osborn captured. He is brought before Veranke/Spider-Woman. She tells him a story about how a priest stood up to her and told her that she would die by the hands of Norman Osborn himself. Therefore, the Skrulls had to integrate themselves into human society and eventually fade away. She claims that the prophet became Osborn himself. Though Norman Osborn tries to deny it, Veranke insists that he is and asks that he kiss her true face. Instead, Norman Osborn commits suicide, and reverts him to his Skrull form.

== In other media ==
=== Television ===
- The plot of the Secret Invasion storyline was adapted in the animated series The Avengers: Earth's Mightiest Heroes. Throughout the first and second seasons, Madame Hydra, Captain America, Invisible Woman, and Mockingbird are captured and replaced with Skrulls. Captain America returns to Earth (along with the real heroes and villains who had been revealed to be replaced before), and the Avengers defeat the Super-Skrulls and Thor destroys their backup plan to wipe out humanity. The invasion is thwarted and the Skrulls are put in S.H.I.E.L.D. custody.
- Secret Invasion was adapted into a live-action series of the same name, set in the Marvel Cinematic Universe (MCU).

=== Video games ===
- Ubisoft and Marvel Entertainment stated Marvel Avengers: Battle for Earth was influenced by Secret Invasion.
- Secret Invasion is used as the basis for Chapter 10 in the plot of Marvel Heroes.

=== Merchandising ===
- Marvel HeroClix released a "Secret Invasion"-themed set based on the storyline. The set included Captain Marvel, Dum Dum Dugan, Criti Noll (as Yellowjacket), Pagon (as Elektra), Ms. Marvel, Edwin Jarvis, and many more. Veranke (as Spider-Woman) and Lyja (as Invisible Woman) were released as chase figures in their Skrull-only personality.
