= New Avengers =

Marvel Comics superhero team

- Promotional art for The New Avengers vol. 2, #1 by Stuart Immonen depicting Spider-Man, Wolverine, Carol Danvers, Luke Cage, and Thing.

Group publication information
- Publisher: Marvel Comics
- First appearance: The New Avengers #1 (January 2005)
- Created by: Brian Michael Bendis (writer); David Finch (artist)

In-story information
- Type of organization: Team
- Base(s): Avengers Mansion

Roster
- See: List of New Avengers members

The New Avengers
- : The New Avengers #1 (January 2005). Cover art by David Finch.

Series publication information
- Schedule: Monthly
- Format: Ongoing series
- Genre: Superhero
- Publication date: Vol. 1: January 2005 – April 2010; Vol. 2: June 2010 – November 2012; Vol. 3: December 2012 – April 2015; Vol. 4: October 2015 – November 2016
- Number of issues: Vol. 1: 64 (+3 Annuals and 1 Finale Special); Vol. 2: 34 (+1 Annual); Vol. 3: 33 (+1 Annual); Vol. 4: 18

Creative team
- Writer(s): Brian Michael Bendis
- Penciller(s): David Finch; Steve McNiven; Leinil Yu; Stuart Immonen; Mike Deodato; Howard Chaykin
- Inker(s): Danny Miki; Matt Banning
- Creator(s): Brian Michael Bendis (writer); David Finch (artist)
- Editor(s): Tom Brevoort; Joe Quesada; Lauren Sankovitch

The New Avengers are a team of superheroes appearing in American comic books published by Marvel Comics. The title has been used for four American comic book series. The first two were written by Brian Michael Bendis and depicted a version of Marvel's premiere superhero team, the Avengers. The third was written by Jonathan Hickman and depicted a group of characters called the Illuminati (formerly introduced in New Avengers vol. 1 #7, July 2005). The fourth is written by Al Ewing and depicts the former scientific terrorist group A.I.M., reformed as "Avengers Idea Mechanics", whose field team has appropriated the name "New Avengers" for itself.

A version of the New Avengers debuted in the Marvel Cinematic Universe (MCU) film Thunderbolts* (2025), and are set to return in Avengers: Doomsday (2026).

== Publication history ==
=== Volume 1 (2005–2010) ===
The New Avengers is a spin-off of the long-running Marvel Comics series The Avengers. The first issue, written by Brian Michael Bendis and penciled by David Finch, was dated January 2005 but appeared in November 2004. Finch penciled the first six issues and issues #11–13. Succeeding pencilers with multiple-issue runs include Steve McNiven, Leinil Francis Yu, Billy Tan, and Stuart Immonen. The roster at first comprises Captain America, Luke Cage, Iron Man, Spider-Man and "Spider-Woman" (Veranke). Later stretches included the mutant X-Man Wolverine, the unstable and godlike Sentry, and the deaf ninja Echo, in the guise of Ronin.

The team itself was not named the "New Avengers" within the series. A splinter group of Avengers that chose not to comply with federal superhuman registration, the team considers itself the authentic Avengers. A concurrent government-sanctioned team gathered in the sister series The Mighty Avengers. This series launched in early 2007 and was itself supplanted by a different government-sanctioned team in the series Dark Avengers, which was launched in late 2008. At this time the team welcomed Clint Barton (recently returned from the dead) as Ronin, as well as Doctor Strange and Iron Fist.

By the end of the first volume, the New Avengers team consisted of Ronin, Captain America (Bucky Barnes), Ms. Marvel, Mockingbird, Spider-Man, Spider-Woman (Drew), Wolverine, and team leader Luke Cage. Writer Brian Michael Bendis said in an interview that these characters are the authentic Avengers because Captain America said they were. This statement is repeated when the team, believing Captain America (Rogers) is alive, attempts to rescue him. Spider-Man claims that if they get Captain America back, they can call themselves Avengers again. Luke Cage contends that they are Avengers already. The series ended with The New Avengers #64 (April 2010), at the conclusion of the "Siege" storyline. A one-shot titled The New Avengers: Finale was also released.

=== Volume 2 (2010–2012) ===
In March 2010, Marvel announced the series would be relaunched in June as part of the company's rebranding initiative, "Heroic Age" . In the first issue of the series, the new team consisted of Luke Cage, Victoria Hand, Iron Fist, Jessica Jones, Mockingbird, Ms. Marvel, Spider-Man, The Thing, and Wolverine. Wolverine and Spider-Man operated on the main Avengers team as well as the New Avengers, and Doctor Strange accepted an offer to join the team after their first mission while searching for the new Sorcerer Supreme after the death of Doctor Voodoo. Daredevil joined the team in issue #16 after accepting an offer from Luke Cage and Jessica Jones. Jessica left the team for personal reasons and was later joined by Luke Cage, thus ending that iteration of the team.

=== Volume 3 (2013–2015) ===
New Avengers was renumbered as a new volume in January 2013, written by Jonathan Hickman and originally drawn by Steve Epting. The new volume shifted its focus to the Illuminati, which included Black Panther(who was originally offered the position to join the team when it was created, but refused), Black Bolt, Captain America, Doctor Strange, Iron Man, Mister Fantastic, and Namor, who reassembled to confront the threat of the incursions. Black Panther and Reed Richards discovered that universal decay centered on Earth was causing universes to collide with one another, with Earth at the focal point. In issue #3, Beast was recruited to assist following the death of Professor X. In the same issue, Captain America leaves. In issue #12, after helping the Illuminati defeat Thanos's forces, Black Bolt's brother Maximus temporarily assisted the group but did not join the Illuminati. Bruce Banner joined the team in Avengers (vol. 5) after discovering the universal decay on his own.

=== Volume 4 (2015–2016) ===
Volume 4 of New Avengers launched in October 2015 as a part of the All-New, All-Different Marvel relaunch, written by Al Ewing with art by Gerardo Sandoval. The comic features a different team from the past three volumes: it focuses on A.I.M. (Advanced Idea Mechanics), a former super-villain group which has been rebranded as the Avengers Idea Mechanics, and their field team which has taken the name of the New Avengers. Sunspot is the new head of A.I.M., with Songbird as the field leader; other members include Wiccan, Hulkling, Squirrel Girl, Pod, Power Man, White Tiger, and Hawkeye as an open informant for S.H.I.E.L.D. Later, there is a schism in the team: Wiccan, Hulkling and Squirrel Girl are expelled from A.I.M. and informed by Sunspot that the three of them are now what remains of the New Avengers; during the same story, Cannonball was revealed to be working for A.I.M. as well. Hawkeye, who had been fired from S.H.I.E.L.D., later rejoins the trio of remaining New Avengers to form a lineup jokingly called "Wiccan's Kooky Quartet". During "Civil War II", the New Avengers assist A.I.M. on one last mission, which Hawkeye sits out for reasons of plausible deniability. After Sunspot's funeral, Advanced Idea Mechanics is declared officially dead so the team breaks up, but later reform as U.S.Avengers.

=== Volume 5 (2025–2026) ===
Following the release of the movie Thunderbolts* (2025), it was announced in May 2025 that the previously solicited New Thunderbolts* ongoing series by writer Sam Humphries and artist Ton Lima would be retitled to New Avengers (vol. 5); (Note: The asterisk refers to the reveal in the film that the Thunderbolts team become the New Avengers.) The first issue is scheduled for release in June 2025. The team will be led by the Winter Soldier with Wolverine (Laura Kinney), Black Widow, Carnage (Eddie Brock), Hulk, Clea Strange, and Namor on the initial roster. The team are assembled to face a new threat in the form of twisted clones of the Illuminati created by the Jackal, revealed to have been set up by a plan created by a secondary personality that the Black Widow had been brainwashed with at some past date. Hulk was only a temporary member who advised the team and offered them an "official" title as they completed their mission to hunt the "Killuminati". The plan was ultimately revealed to have been intended to clone Baron Zemo back to life after he was killed by Doctor Doom in his role as Emperor of the world, but Black Widow became aware of her secondary persona and was able to sabotage her own efforts. With the Killuminati defeated, the team officially disbanded after a meeting with Iron Man and Captain Marvel, Black Widow noting that they all knew they couldn't work together long-term.

== Fictional team biography ==
=== Assembling the Avengers ===
Following a reign of destruction by an insane Scarlet Witch, the Avengers disband. Six months later, with the Fantastic Four and the X-Men unable to act, the supervillain Electro shuts down power at the Raft, a "maximum-maximum security" prison for super-powered criminals, allowing for a mass breakout. "Jessica Drew (Spider-Woman)", an agent for the international law-enforcement agency S.H.I.E.L.D., is at the Raft with attorney Matt Murdock (Daredevil) and "hero for hire" Luke Cage. They are joined by Captain America, Iron Man, and Spider-Man. They are also assisted by a mentally unbalanced Sentry, who is imprisoned at the Raft. The riot is quelled, although 42 inmates escape. Captain America declares fate has brought this group together, just as it had the original Avengers. Most of the heroes agree to join the team. Daredevil refuses the offer and Sentry flies off.

The team's first mission is to capture the remaining super-powered criminals who escaped during the riot. The unexpected emergence of an unrelated team of youthful heroes, the Young Avengers, is also a matter of concern. There is also a growing sense of unease with S.H.I.E.L.D. after the disappearance of its leader, Nick Fury. The New Avengers travel to the Savage Land to capture the reptilian mutant Sauron, encountering resistance from the Savage Land Mutates (led by Brainchild) and a rogue squadron of S.H.I.E.L.D. agents led by Yelena Belova. During this conflict, Canadian mutant Wolverine joins the team (while maintaining concurrent membership in the X-Men). The group also recruits the Sentry, a powerful hero who erased all memory of his career from the world after he was manipulated by the mutant Mastermind and The General.

=== House of M and The Collective ===
With Xavier unable to repair the fractured psyche of the Scarlet Witch, the New Avengers and Cyclops' team of X-Men consider the alternatives. Fearful that the heroes are preparing to kill his sister, former Avenger Quicksilver convinces her to use her reality-altering powers to transform the planet and its history. Instantaneously, Magneto rules the planet under the banner of the "House of M", with mutants in the majority and non-powered humans as an oppressed minority. Reality is eventually restored, but the Scarlet Witch removes the superhuman abilities from over 99% of the mutants on Earth. These lost powers manifest as the Collective, the assembled energy of the depowered mutants. This energy is controlled by the intelligence known as Xorn (who once posed as Magneto) and uses the energy-wielder Michael Pointer as a host. The Avengers manage to separate the two after the Collective/Xorn attempts to re-power Magneto.

=== Civil War ===
After the reckless actions of the New Warriors result in the deaths of over 600 civilians in Stamford, Connecticut, Congress passes the Superhuman Registration Act, which requires all superhumans to register with the federal government. Many superheroes comply with this law, but others oppose the law on the grounds that it violates civil liberties. This ideological split leads to a Civil War within the New Avengers and the superhuman community at large, with Iron Man leading those who comply with the law, and Captain America leading those who oppose it. By the time that open hostilities between the two factions come to a close, Spider-Man's closely guarded secret identity is exposed to the world, and Bill Foster (one of Hank Pym's successors as Giant-Man) is killed. Shortly thereafter, Captain America is seemingly assassinated.

=== Avengers Underground ===
In the aftermath of the superhero civil war, the New Avengers become an unofficial group of unregistered heroes. The team moves to Doctor Strange's Sanctum Sanctorum in Greenwich Village, recruiting the resurrected Clint Barton (now using the name and costume of Ronin). They eventually relocate to an empty apartment building owned by Danny Rand's (Iron Fist) Rand Corporation, but leased in the name of Samuel Sterns (the Leader, an adversary of the Hulk).

=== Secret Invasion ===
Following this, the New Avengers play a major role in repelling the "Secret Invasion" of Earth by the Skrulls, a shapeshifting alien race which has sought to conquer the planet for years. In one confrontation, the team rescues several heroes who had been kidnapped and replaced by Skrull impostors at various unspecified times in the past. This includes the presumed-dead Mockingbird, wife of Clint Barton (Ronin), with whom she reunites. Additionally, it is revealed that Spider-Woman was replaced by the Skrull queen Veranke, prior to the prison break at The Raft that led to the formation of the New Avengers. Thus, Jessica Drew had never been a member of the team.

=== Dark Reign ===
Upon the Skrulls' defeat, S.H.I.E.L.D. is dismantled and replaced by H.A.M.M.E.R., a new intelligence agency. Norman Osborn (who has been Spider-Man's archenemy as the Green Goblin) is placed in control of H.A.M.M.E.R. and the Thunderbolts, while assembling a team of Avenger imposters composed of supervillains. Meanwhile, the revamped New Avengers roster consists of Captain America (Bucky Barnes), Luke Cage, Ronin, Mockingbird, Ms. Marvel, Spider-Man, the real Spider-Woman and Wolverine. Captain America offers these "new Avengers" his home as a base of operations. Iron Fist announces he must leave the group to attend to personal business, but will remain on call. The team elects Ronin as leader (with Ms. Marvel as second-in-command), and persuades Spider-Man to once again reveal his secret identity to his fellow members.

=== Heroic Age ===
With the Registration Act having been revoked in the aftermath of the Siege of Asgard led by Norman Osborn (who is incarcerated for his actions), Steve Rogers (the original Captain America, returned from his alleged death) reassembles the Avengers. Steve convinces a reluctant Luke Cage to be part of the new lineup after Tony Stark sells the reconstructed Avengers Mansion to Cage for a dollar, and Steve gives Cage carte blanche to maintain the New Avengers team, leading it as he sees fit. Given the freedom to recruit almost anyone he wants for the New Avengers team (except Iron Man or Thor), Cage selects Clint Barton (who has resumed the Hawkeye identity), Iron Fist, Jewel (Cage's wife Jessica Jones), Ms. Marvel, Mockingbird, Spider-Man, the Thing (who maintains concurrent membership in the Fantastic Four), and Wolverine. Rogers also sends him Victoria Hand on the grounds that she can provide the team with a unique insight from which Rogers feels they will benefit. Although Hawkeye leaves the team when a crisis comes up with the main Avengers team (claiming that he only joined them to spend time with his wife), the team later enlists a now-weakened Doctor Strange after he assists them in tackling a dimensional crisis. Squirrel Girl and Wong are hired as a super-powered babysitter for Cage's and Jewel's baby and mansion housekeeper respectively, although they do not serve directly on the main lineup of the New Avengers.

Spider-Man appears to want to leave the team prior to the Fear Itself event due to his distrust of Victoria Hand and his new responsibilities in the Future Foundation, but subsequent conversations with Wolverine and Luke Cage convince him to remain an active member. After Fear Itself, the team lineup shifts, initially with the addition of Daredevil to the team and later with Jessica Jones leaving the team out of fear for her baby Danielle's safety.

=== Post AvX ===
Luke Cage leaves the team after the events of Avengers vs. X-Men to ensure the security of his wife and baby.

The remaining New Avengers band together with Doctor Strange when the Ghost of Daniel Drumm returns. He possesses each of the New Avengers and kills various evil sorcerers. Convinced that Daniel set his brother (Brother Voodoo) up to fail in his new role, Doctor Strange defeats him by using dark magic (recognizing that Drumm had only killed dark magic specialists while trying to frame Strange). As a result, Doctor Strange subsequently regains his position of Sorcerer Supreme.

=== Marvel NOW! ===
Under the Marvel NOW! label, a third volume of New Avengers was launched, written by Jonathan Hickman. With Hickman in charge of the entire Avengers line, New Avengers carried a parallel storyline to the main Avengers series. Rather than featuring a traditional team of Avengers, the book focused on the Illuminati. Black Panther joins Black Bolt, Captain America, Doctor Strange, Iron Man, Mister Fantastic, and Namor when faced with a universal threat. Beast joins the team as a replacement for the deceased Professor X.

Black Panther discovers a second Earth hanging above Wakanda and witnesses Black Swan destroy the alternate Earth. Black Panther captures and imprisons the Black Swan and reforms the Illuminati. Using Black Swan's information, Reed Richards discovers the threat of Incursions, a multiversal chain reaction causing universes to collide with one another, with Earth of every universe at the focal point, resulting in the destruction of both universes unless one Earth is destroyed, allowing the other to pass through. As the Illuminati consider darker and darker avenues to save the universe, Captain America's steadfast morals are put at odds with the other members of the Illuminati. Captain America is voted out of the group with a spell of forgetfulness cast by Strange.

Faced with the possibility of having to destroy a world, the scientists of the Illuminati set about building a number of weapons, including a number of antimatter injection bombs similar to the one used by the Black Swan, a Dyson sphere designed to weaponize the sun, a Builder Worldkiller ship kept in Jupiter's orbit, and a rogue planet kept slightly out-of-phase with Earth. The Illuminati survived a number of incursions using these and other methods; at one near Liberty Island, Galactus ate the alternate Earth, and they used an antimatter bomb to destroy a dead Earth over Latveria.

During the "Infinity" event, alternate-universe Builders destroy an Earth for the Illuminati. The event ended with the defeat of Thanos' forces and the capture of Thanos and his generals Proxima Midnight and Corvus Glaive, all three of whom were imprisoned in amber by Thanos' son Thane. They joined Black Swan and Terrax as Illuminati prisoners.

The members of the Illuminati became increasingly cut off from the outside community as a result of their actions. Namor's kingdom was destroyed by Proxima Midnight during Thanos' invasion, and Black Panther was cast out of Wakanda for his alliance with Namor, with whom his sister Shuri was at war. Black Bolt and his brother Maximus faked the Inhuman king's death following the destruction of the Terrigen Bomb to allow the Inhumans to rebuild separately from the Illuminati's machinations. Doctor Strange, feeling increasingly cut off from his scientist-dominated colleagues, decided to empower himself to perhaps be able to solve the incursions, and so used the Blood Bible to travel to the Sinner's Market, where he sold his soul in exchange for godlike power. Upon discovering multiversal decay on his own after meeting an alternate version of himself, Bruce Banner confronts Tony Stark, who recruits him into the Illuminati.

Faced with a number of multiversal groups also trying to survive the incursion crisis – the faceless sorcerers the Black Priests, the adaptoid robots the Mapmakers, and the mysterious Ivory Kings – the Illuminati built a device to allow them to view other Earths' pasts so they could see how incursions there were handled. They learned about Mapmakers and Black Priests, but also discovered that Black Swan had teamed up with alternate Illuminati groups in the past, and had even killed alternate versions of Iron Man and Reed Richards when they were no longer useful. Just before the team could confront Black Swan about her deception, another incursion occurred, this time pitting the Illuminati against the Great Society, a team of heroes which, like the Illuminati, had thus far fought off incursions to save its world.

Following an eight-month ellipsis during the Time Runs Out storyline, a new group calling themselves the New Avengers emerge. This team consists of former members of the Avengers who broke away from the main team after Captain America partnered with S.H.I.E.L.D. to hunt down the Illuminati.

=== All-New, All-Different Marvel ===
As part of the All-New, All-Different Marvel event, Sunspot's branch of the Avengers become the latest incarnation of the New Avengers. Their first opponent ended up being the terrorist organization W.H.I.S.P.E.R. (short for World Headquarters for International Scientific/Philosophical Experimentation and Research) that was founded by Mister Fantastic's Earth-1610 counterpart Maker and consisting of the former members of A.I.M. that were chased off by Sunspot. The New Avengers fought W.H.I.S.P.E.R. to destroy their Life-Minus experiment which involved capturing the souls of the dead in special crystals as part of a plan to create a new lifeform. The crystals were later destroyed by Songbird's sonic scream.

The Life-Minus experiment also conjured up Moridun, a dark entity from the Fifth Cosmos (the Marvel Universe having recently been reborn in its eighth iteration in the events of Secret Wars). The New Avengers encountered Moridun when he took over the body of M'Ryn the Magus — leader of the Knights of the Infinite, a magical order of Kree-Skrull hybrids who revealed Hulkling to be their prophesied future king. When Moridun attacked them and attempted to devour their souls, repeating the phrase "Life is horror", the New Avengers apparently defeated him — but Moridun planted a seed of his consciousness inside Billy Kaplan's mind and began to slowly infect him. Billy changed his codename from Wiccan to Demiurge, and began to act increasingly amoral. They were alerted to Moridun's survival when the Avengers of the year 20XX came back to the present day through A.I.M.'s new time machine, warning that Moridun would destroy Demiurge's soul completely and use his near-godlike power to almost completely destroy the world. Finding Billy already infected, the future Avengers tried to kill him; instead, with Hulkling's help, Billy was able to recognise Moridun's presence in his own mind and successfully defeat him on the mental plane, expelling Moridun from his body and mind. The Maker engineered the prison break of Angela Del Toro, the former White Tiger, and presented her with the Tiger Amulet from the Ultimate Universe. She fought with Ava Ayala in Rome, causing the Tiger Gods from the two amulets to merge into one, leaving Del Toro with the powers of the White Tiger and Ava powerless.

In the "Avengers: Standoff!" event, A.I.M. received a distress call from Rick Jones when he is taken into S.H.I.E.L.D. custody. Hawkeye decided to break with S.H.I.E.L.D. for good and supported a rescue mission. Hulkling, Wiccan and Squirrel Girl, the only three dissenters, were expelled from A.I.M. and teleported to the desert – Sunspot also conferred the name of "New Avengers" on them. The remaining A.I.M. field team successfully rescued Rick from the Agents of S.H.I.E.L.D.'s battlecarrier. In response, the U.S. military launched an attack on Avengers Island with the American Kaiju (a Marine corporal transmogrified into a giant lizard monster) – as A.I.M. evacuated the island, they battled the monster with the mentally-controlled giant robot Avenger Five. Meanwhile, S.H.I.E.L.D. also launched a counterattack as led by John Garrett, forcing Songbird to reveal that she had been a deep-cover S.H.I.E.L.D. mole. The American Kaiju was defeated by forcing it back into human form. Rick got cold feet about throwing in with A.I.M. and fled, and as a result S.H.I.E.L.D. successfully detained Hawkeye. The remainder of A.I.M. successfully evacuated to Avenger Two, a secondary base in the Savage Land run by Cannonball.

Hawkeye was fired from S.H.I.E.L.D. for his betrayal. He, Wiccan, Hulkling, and Squirrel Girl decided to reform the New Avengers with Wiccan as the new team leader after fighting the Plunderer together. Meanwhile, Songbird openly became a S.H.I.E.L.D. agent, but was in fact still loyal to Sunspot.

== Collected editions ==
The New Avengers has been collected in a series of editions that had both hardcover and trade paperback releases.

=== New Avengers Vol. 1 (2005) ===
==== Trade paperbacks ====
Title	Material collected	Publication date	ISBN
New Avengers Vol. 1: Breakout	The New Avengers #1–6	January 18, 2006	0-7851-1479-3
New Avengers Vol. 2: The Sentry	The New Avengers #7–10; New Avengers: Most Wanted Files	July 26, 2006	0-7851-1672-9
New Avengers Vol. 3: Secrets and Lies	The New Avengers #11–15 and material from Giant-Size Spider-Woman #1	September 6, 2006	0-7851-1706-7
New Avengers Vol. 4: The Collective	The New Avengers #16–20	April 4, 2007	0-7851-1987-6
New Avengers Vol. 5: Civil War	The New Avengers #21–25	September 5, 2007	0-7851-2446-2
New Avengers Vol. 6: Revolution	The New Avengers #26–31	November 21, 2007	0-7851-2468-3
New Avengers Vol. 7: The Trust	The New Avengers #32–37, Annual #2	July 16, 2008	0-7851-2503-5
New Avengers Vol. 8: Secret Invasion (Book 1)	The New Avengers #38–42	February 25, 2009	978-0785129479
New Avengers Vol. 9: Secret Invasion (Book 2)	The New Avengers #43–47	May 6, 2009	978-0785129486
New Avengers Vol.10: Power	The New Avengers #48–50; and material fromSecret Invasion: Dark Reign	August 5, 2009	978-0785135593
New Avengers Vol. 11: Search for the Sorcerer Supreme	The New Avengers #51–54	September 25, 2009	978-0785136897
New Avengers Vol. 12: Powerloss	The New Avengers #55–60	March 24, 2010	0-7851-4575-3
New Avengers Vol. 13: Siege	The New Avengers #61–64, Annual #3; The New Avengers Finale	July 28, 2010	978-0785145783
New Avengers: The Reunion	New Avengers Reunion #1–4, and material from Dark Reign: New Nation	March 2010	978-0785138556
New Avengers: Luke Cage	New Avengers: Luke Cage #1–3 and Daredevil: Cage Match #1, Hero for Hire #1	October 2010	978-0785144175
New Avengers/Transformers	Transformers/New Avengers #1–4	February 2008	978-0785127901

==== Complete Collections ====
#	Subtitle	Years covered	Issues collected	Pages	Released	ISBN
1	New Avengers by Brian Michael Bendis: The Complete Collection Vol. 1	2004–2005	Avengers (vol. 1) #500–503, Avengers (vol. 1) #500 Director's Cut; Avengers Finale; New Avengers #1–10, New Avengers #1 Director's Cut; New Avengers Most Wanted Files	504	17 Jan 2017	978-1302903626
2	New Avengers by Brian Michael Bendis: The Complete Collection Vol. 2	2005–2007	New Avengers #11–25, New Avengers Guest Starring the Fantastic Four, Giant-Size Spider-Woman #1, New Avengers Annual #1, New Avengers: Illuminati (vol. 1) #1, Civil War: The Confession	496	15 Feb 2017	978-1302903633
3	New Avengers by Brian Michael Bendis: The Complete Collection Vol. 3	2007–2008	Civil War: The Initiative, New Avengers #26–37, New Avengers Annual #2, New Avengers: Illuminati (vol. 2) #1–5	464	1 Mar 2017	978-1302903640
4	New Avengers by Brian Michael Bendis: The Complete Collection Vol. 4	2008–2009	New Avengers #38–54, Secret Invasion: Dark Reign	480	3 May 2017	978-1302908652
5	New Avengers by Brian Michael Bendis: The Complete Collection Vol. 5	2009–2010	Avengers: FCBD 2009 Special, New Avengers #55–64, Dark Reign: The List- Avengers, New Avengers Annual #3, New Avengers Finale; material from Amazing Spider-Man #601, Breaking into Comics the Marvel Way #1	408	7 Jun 2017	978-1302908669

==== Modern Era Epic Collections ====
#	Subtitle	Years covered	Issues collected	Pages	Released	ISBN
1	Assembled	2004–2005	Avengers (1963) #500–503, Avengers Finale, New Avengers (2004) #1–10, New Avengers #1 Director's Cut, New Avengers Most Wanted Files	504	29 Aug 2023	978-1302952617
2	Civil War	2005–2007	New Avengers (2004) #11–25, Annual (2006) #1; New Avengers Guest Starring the Fantastic Four; Giant-Size Spider-Woman #1; New Avengers: Illuminati One-Shot; Civil War: The Confession	496	17 Dec 2024	978-1302955816
3	The Initiative	2007–2008	Civil War: The Initiative (2007); New Avengers (2004) 26–37, Annual (2006) #2; New Avengers: Illuminati (2007) #1–5	464	13 May 2025	978-1302963842

==== Oversized hardcovers ====
#	Title	Years covered	Material collected	Pages	Released	ISBN
1	New Avengers Vol. 1	2004–2005	New Avengers #1–10; New Avengers: Most Wanted Files; New Avengers, Guest Starring The Fantastic Four	352	21 Nov 2007	David Finch cover: 978-0785124641
1	New Avengers Vol. 1	2004–2005	New Avengers #1–10; New Avengers: Most Wanted Files; New Avengers, Guest Starring The Fantastic Four	352	21 Nov 2007	Bookshop variant cover: 978-0785129554
2	New Avengers Vol. 2	2005–2006	New Avengers #11–20; New Avengers Annual (2005); Giant-Size Spider-Woman	296	2 Apr 2008	Steve McNiven cover: 978-0785130857
2	New Avengers Vol. 2	2005–2006	New Avengers #11–20; New Avengers Annual (2005); Giant-Size Spider-Woman	296	2 Apr 2008	David Finch DM cover: 978-0785131359
3	New Avengers Vol. 3	2006–2007	New Avengers #21–31; New Avengers: Illuminati; Civil War: The Confession; Civil War: The Initiative	360	28 Jan 2009	Bookshop cover: 978-0785137634
3	New Avengers Vol. 3	2006–2007	New Avengers #21–31; New Avengers: Illuminati; Civil War: The Confession; Civil War: The Initiative	360	28 Jan 2009	Leinil Francis Yu DM cover: Unknown ISBN
4	New Avengers Vol. 4	2007–2008	New Avengers #32–37; New Avengers Annual #2; New Avengers: Illuminati #1–5	320	28 Apr 2010	Jim Cheung cover: 978-0785142621
5	New Avengers Vol. 5	2008	New Avengers #38–47	256	9 Jun 2010	Aleksi Briclot cover: 978-0785145790
6	New Avengers Vol. 6	2009	New Avengers #48–54; Secret Invasion: Dark Reign; FCBD 2009: Avengers	256	1 Jun 2011	Billy Tan cover: 978-0785156482
7	New Avengers Vol. 7	2009–2010	New Avengers #55–64; New Avengers Annual #3; Dark Reign: The List – Avengers; New Avengers Finale	368	7 Sep 2011	Bryan Hitch cover: 978-0785156765

==== Omnibus ====
#	Title	Years covered	Material collected	Pages	Released	ISBN
	New Avengers	2004–2007	Avengers (1963) #500–503, Avengers Finale, New Avengers (2005) #1–31, Annual #1, New Avengers and the Fantastic Four #1, Giant-Size Spider-Woman #1, New Avengers: Illuminati (2006) #1, Civil War: The Confession #1, Civil War: The Initiative #1, New Avengers: Most Wanted Files #1	1,208	29 Sep 2012	David Finch cover: 978-0785164890
	New Avengers	2004–2007	Avengers (1963) #500–503, Avengers Finale, New Avengers (2005) #1–31, Annual #1, New Avengers and the Fantastic Four #1, Giant-Size Spider-Woman #1, New Avengers: Illuminati (2006) #1, Civil War: The Confession #1, Civil War: The Initiative #1, New Avengers: Most Wanted Files #1	1,208	29 Sep 2012	Joe Quesada DM cover: 978-0785165750
	New Avengers	2004–2007	Avengers (1963) #500–503, Avengers Finale, New Avengers (2005) #1–31, Annual #1, New Avengers and the Fantastic Four #1, Giant-Size Spider-Woman #1, New Avengers: Illuminati (2006) #1, Civil War: The Confession #1, Civil War: The Initiative #1, New Avengers: Most Wanted Files #1	1,208	7 Jan 2025	David Finch cover: 978-1302959142
	New Avengers	2004–2007	Avengers (1963) #500–503, Avengers Finale, New Avengers (2005) #1–31, Annual #1, New Avengers and the Fantastic Four #1, Giant-Size Spider-Woman #1, New Avengers: Illuminati (2006) #1, Civil War: The Confession #1, Civil War: The Initiative #1, New Avengers: Most Wanted Files #1	1,208	7 Jan 2025	Joe Quesada DM cover: 978-1302959159

=== New Avengers Vol. 2 (2010) ===
Title	Material collected	Publication date	ISBN
New Avengers Vol. 1	New Avengers (vol. 2) #1–6	January 26, 2011	978-0785148722
New Avengers Vol. 2	New Avengers (vol. 2)#7–13	August 31, 2011	978-0785148746
Avengers: Fear Itself	New Avengers (vol. 2) #14–16 and Avengers (vol. 4) #13–17	January 25, 2012	978-0785163480
New Avengers Vol. 3	New Avengers (vol. 2) #16.1, 17–23	May 16, 2012	978-0785151791
New Avengers Vol. 4 :AvX	New Avengers (vol. 2) #24–30	November 28, 2012	978-0785161561
New Avengers Vol. 5: End Times	New Avengers (vol. 2) #31–34	March 5, 2013	978-0785161585
New Avengers by Brian Michael Bendis: The Complete Collection Vol. 6	New Avengers (vol. 2) #1–16	July 2017	978-1302908676
New Avengers by Brian Michael Bendis: The Complete Collection Vol. 7	New Avengers (vol. 2) #16.1, 17–34	September 2017	978-1302908683

=== New Avengers Vol. 3 (2013) ===
Title	Material collected	Publication date	ISBN
New Avengers Vol. 1: Everything Dies	New Avengers (vol. 3) #1–6	July 16, 2013	978-0785168362
New Avengers Vol. 2: Infinity	New Avengers (vol. 3) #7–12	January 14, 2014	978-0785168379
New Avengers Vol. 3: Other Worlds	New Avengers (vol. 3) #13–17	July 1, 2014	978-0785154846
New Avengers Vol. 4: Perfect World	New Avengers (vol. 3) #18–23	November 18, 2014	978-0785154853
Avengers: Time Runs Out Vol. 1	New Avengers (vol. 3) #24–25 and Avengers (vol. 5) #35–37	January 14, 2015	978-0785193418
Avengers: Time Runs Out Vol. 2	New Avengers (vol. 3) #26–28 and Avengers (vol. 5) #38–39	March 10, 2015	978-0785193722
Avengers: Time Runs Out Vol. 3	New Avengers (vol. 3) #29–30 and Avengers (vol. 5) #40–42	May 26, 2015	978-0785192220
Avengers: Time Runs Out Vol. 4	New Avengers (vol. 3) #31–33 and Avengers (vol. 5) #43–44	June 30, 2015	978-0785192244
Avengers: Time Runs Out Collection	New Avengers (vol. 3) #24–33 and Avengers (vol. 5) #35–44	July 2016	978-0785198093
New Avengers by Jonathan Hickman Vol. 1	New Avengers (vol. 3) #1–12	April 2015	978-0785193968
New Avengers by Jonathan Hickman Vol. 2	New Avengers (vol. 3) #13–23	November 2015	978-0785197096
Avengers by Jonathan Hickman: The Complete Collection Vol. 1	New Avengers (vol. 3) #1–6 and Avengers (vol. 5) #1–5, Astonishing Tales: Mojoworld #1–6	September 2020	978-1302925093
Avengers by Jonathan Hickman: The Complete Collection Vol. 2	New Avengers (vol. 3) #7 and Avengers (vol. 5) #6–17 and material from Shang-Chi: Master of Kung Fu #1	December 2020	978-1302925307
Avengers by Jonathan Hickman: The Complete Collection Vol. 3	New Avengers (vol. 3) #8–12 and Avengers (vol. 5) #18–23, Infinity #1–6,	February 2021	978-1302926472
Avengers by Jonathan Hickman: The Complete Collection Vol. 4	New Avengers (vol. 3) #13–23 and Avengers (vol. 5) #24–34	April 2021	978-1302926489
Avengers by Jonathan Hickman: The Complete Collection Vol. 5	New Avengers (vol. 3) #24–33 and Avengers (vol. 5) #35–44	July 2022	978-1302933517
Avengers by Jonathan Hickman Omnibus Vol. 1	New Avengers (vol. 3) #1–12 and Avengers (vol. 5) #1–23, Free Comic Book Day 2013 (Infinity) #1, Infinity #1–6, Infinity: Against the Tide Infinite Comic #1–2, Astonishing Tales: Mojoworld #1–6, and material from Shang-Chi: Master of Kung Fu #1	July 2017	978-1302907082
Avengers by Jonathan Hickman Omnibus Vol. 2	New Avengers (vol.3) #13–33 and Avengers (vol. 5) #24–44	July 2018	978-1302911812

=== New Avengers Vol. 4 (2015) ===
Title	Material collected	Publication date	ISBN
New Avengers: A.I.M. Vol. 1: Everything Is New	New Avengers (vol. 4) #1–6 and material from Avengers (vol. 6) #0	May 10, 2016	978-0785196488
New Avengers: A.I.M. Vol. 2: Standoff	New Avengers (vol. 4) #7–11	August 16, 2016	978-0785196495
New Avengers: A.I.M. Vol. 3: Civil War II	New Avengers (vol. 4) #12–18	December 28, 2016	978-1302902353

== Other versions ==
=== Marvel 2099 ===
On the unified Marvel 2099 reality of Earth-2099, the 2099 version of the New Avengers were formed by Moon Knight (Tabitha) and consist of Aero (Zhe Li), Black Panther (T'Shamba), Captain America (Roberta Mendez), an unidentified 2099 version of Captain Britain, Captain Marvel (Rowena Stern), Gladiator (a Strontian named Kubark), Hulk 2099, an unidentified 2099 version of She-Hulk, Spider-Man 2099, Spider-Woman (Sivern Dru), and Wave (MacKenzie Salgado) after most of her teammates in the Avengers were killed by the Masters of Evil. The New Avengers defeated the Masters of Evil and remanded them to a prison on the planet Wakanda.

=== Ultimate Marvel ===
The Ultimate Marvel version of the New Avengers is called the New Ultimates. It was formed by Iron Man and Hawkeye to fight the Defenders who are being used by Loki to obtain Mjolnir.

== In other media ==
=== Television ===
- The New Avengers appear in The Avengers: Earth's Mightiest Heroes. This version of the group is part of a fail-safe program developed by Tony Stark to ensure the world would still have heroes in the event that the Avengers are killed. In the New Avengers' self-titled episode, Kang the Conqueror traps the original Avengers in a temporal void, but Stark's computer systems bring Luke Cage, Iron Fist, Spider-Man, the Thing, War Machine, and Wolverine together to defeat Kang and save the original Avengers. In the series finale "Avengers Assemble!", the New Avengers reunite to help the original Avengers repel an attack from Galactus and his Heralds.
- The New Avengers, renamed the All-New, All-Different Avengers, appear in Avengers: Secret Wars, led by the Black Panther and consisting of Captain Marvel, Ms. Marvel, the Vision, Ant-Man, and the Wasp.

=== Film ===
- The New Avengers appear in the Marvel Cinematic Universe (MCU) film Thunderbolts* (2025), consisting of Yelena Belova, U.S. Agent, Ghost, Red Guardian, Bucky Barnes, and Sentry. This version of the group is a government-sanctioned team formed by Valentina Allegra de Fontaine and was formerly known as the Thunderbolts.
- The New Avengers will appear in the upcoming MCU film Avengers: Doomsday (2026).

=== Video games ===
- The New Avengers appear in Marvel: Ultimate Alliance, consisting of Luke Cage, Captain America, Iron Man, Spider-Man, Spider-Woman, and Wolverine.
- The New Avengers appear in Marvel: Ultimate Alliance 2, consisting of Luke Cage, Iron Fist, Iron Man, Ms. Marvel, Spider-Man, and Wolverine.

=== Miscellaneous ===
- The Breakout storyline seen in The New Avengers issues #1 to #6 was adapted into a prose novel written by comic writer Alisa Kwitney in January 2013 as part of the Marvel Prose Novel series. It is significantly altered to feature Hawkeye and Black Widow as the main characters due to their appearance and relationship in The Avengers (2012), replacing Sentry and Wolverine in the story. Barton is depicted as a S.H.I.E.L.D. agent like his film counterpart whilst Natasha is depicted as a rogue agent whose ties are unclear. As the events of "One More Day" had transpired, Spider-Man's reasons for his initial involvement is also altered. Jessica Drew and Luke Cage are retained as significant characters and are introduced to a new audience as a result.
- GraphicAudio released an audio adaptation of the Kwitney novelisation in 2014.
