= Minimates =

Toy line

Minimates are a block-styled miniature action figure originally created by Art Asylum in 2002, and released by Diamond Select Toys as of 2007. The basic Minimate figure design has a 2 in (51 mm) tall humanoid body with 14 points of articulation. Released in both specialty stores as well as mass-market retailers, Minimates are made for both kid-friendly and adult-oriented properties. The toys are primarily based on licenses from a wide range of comic books, television series, movies, and video games. The longest-running series of Minimates is based on Marvel Comics, with over 85 waves of figures released to date.

== History ==
2" Spider-Man Minimate in early Marvel Minimate packaging

Designed and produced by New York City-based sculpting and design house Art Asylum, Minimates began in 2002 with multiple lines of 3" Minimates based on several different licenses. These included Dark Angel, Star Trek, Kung Faux, Crouching Tiger, Hidden Dragon, and the films of Bruce Lee, along with a Rock line featuring Kiss, Rob Zombie, Ozzy Osbourne and Alice Cooper. The 3" Minimate line also included several blank or promotional Minimates. These usually bore the logo of a specific company and were used as giveaways.

Following a partnership with Diamond Select Toys, a range of 2" Minimates based upon the Marvel Comics Universe was launched. The 2" Minimate body type began to be used in place of the 3" body type, and it was announced that the 3" range would be discontinued. In 2004, a Lord of the Rings line produced by Art Asylum and Play Along Toys added a third 2.5" tall body type to further illustrate the size differences of the various races of Middle-Earth.

In 2004, Art Asylum and Play Along launched their Minimate-based C3 ("Create Construct Customize") construction sets, which could be used to build vehicles and playsets from the DC Comics universe with a primary focus on Batman and the Justice League. The license terms limited the selling of the 2" DC Minimates to the construction sets, and the line failed to gain a foothold in the market. C3 was discontinued, and in 2006 DC Direct announced that they had picked up the DC Minimates line and would release their own figures in partnership with Art Asylum. That same year, non-construction-set vehicles were introduced to the brand, in lines based on the Speed Racer cartoon (from Art Asylum) as well as both the classic and modern Battlestar Galactica TV series (from Art Asylum and Diamond Select Toys).

In 2007, Art Asylum became a division of Diamond Select Toys, and the Minimates body type has since been applied to dozens of licenses from comic books (The Walking Dead, Invincible), TV (24, Star Trek), movies (Terminator 2: Judgment Day, Universal Monsters, Marvel Studios), animation (The Real Ghostbusters, Peter Pan) and video games (Halo, Tomb Raider, Marvel vs. Capcom 3). DST has also developed Minimates based on its own concepts, under the brands Calico Jack's Pirate Raiders, Minimates M.A.X., and Battle Beasts, which they acquired the trademark for in 2009.

== Minimate Product Types ==
Most Minimates lines are sold as two-packs in assortments, or four-packs, both of which are available online or at local comic stores. Some were shared between Toys "R" Us or Walgreens and the specialty store market. Exclusive Minimates releases have been offered at major pop culture conventions, including San Diego's Comic-Con International, New York Comic Con and C2E2.

Due to license restrictions limiting all Marvel Minimates to the 2" scale, a range of four 8" unarticulated resin statues under the "Minimates Max" banner were announced for 2006 to represent larger-scale characters in the Minimate style. Because of the cost and unarticulated nature of the statues, the line was not well received and eventually cancelled. Only two of the four announced statues, Galactus and the Sentinel, were released.

The Minimates Vehicles line featured original ships and jets from the Calico Jack's Pirate Raiders and M.A.X brands alongside licensed vehicles from licenses such as Terminator 2: Judgment Day, Back to the Future and Knight Rider. Each assortment featured color variations between Toys R Us and specialty markets to differentiate between the two releases.

A carrying case that holds up to 36 Minimates was also produced, and comes with an exclusive figure. The first edition came with a Battle Beast, the second edition with a Pirate Raider, and the third, released in 2013, came with a silver 10th Anniversary Minimate.

In 2015, a line of 4" Minimates-styled figures began under the name Vinimates. The figures had pre-posed bodies with articulated necks for a range of head movement, except in the DC Comics line where the heads were locked in place. Vinimates often shared licenses with Minimates, but some licenses were exclusive to Vinimates such as Caddyshack and The Rocketeer.

== Media ==
In 2005, animation students at the DAVE School (The Digital Animation & Visual Effects School) produced Batman: New Times, featuring computer-generated Minimate characters, as a class project. New Times features is notable for its all-star cast including Adam West and Mark Hamill reprising their respective roles as the Batman and the Joker. The film was released as a download on the DAVE School website and was available as a free DVD. As a promotional item, a Batman Minimate was released to tie-in with the film.

In 2006, an animated X-Men movie in the same style as Batman: New Times was produced under the name X-Men: Darktide. Released on DVD as part of a box set containing Minimates of Magneto, Cyclops, Wolverine, and Juggernaut, the movie features those characters as well as Minimate versions of Storm, Beast, and Archangel.

Diamond Select Toys has also produced online stop-motion animation videos for its line of Walking Dead Minimates, and also its in-house brands, including Calico Jack's Pirate Raiders, Minimates M.A.X., and Battle Beasts.

A final short film directed by Kevin Smith featuring the View Askew characters was produced, but never released. Clips have surfaced online which showed bloody fight sequences between characters such as Brodie from Mallrats and Dante from Clerks II.

== Licenses (Current and Past) ==
Licence / Series	Sub-Licence(s)	First Release	Formats
24		2007	2" Minimates
Alice: Madness Returns		2011	2" Minimates
Alice Through the Looking Glass		2016	2" Minimates, Vinimates
Aliens	Alien, Aliens, Aliens (Comic Books), Alien 3, Alien Resurrection, Alien Covenant	2015	2" Minimates, Deluxe Sets, Vehicles, Vinimates
All Elite Wrestling (AEW)		2023	2" Minimates, Deluxe Sets, Vinimates
Back to the Future	Back to the Future, Back to the Future Part II, Back to the Future Part 3	2007	2" Minimates, Vehicles, Vinimates
Battle Beasts		2013	2" Minimates, Carrying Cases
Battlestar Galactica	Battlestar Galactica (1978), Battlestar Galactica (2004), Battlestar Galactica: Razor	2006	2" Minimates, Vehicles
Beetlejuice		2017	2" Minimates, Vinimates
Beverly Hills Cop		Unreleased	2" Minimates
The Big Bang Theory		2014	2" Minimates
The Black Hole		2019	Vinimates
Bruce Lee		2002	2" Minimates (Unreleased), 3" Minimates, Vinimates (Unreleased)
Buck Rogers	Buck Rogers in the 25th Century	2015	2" Minimates
Caddyshack		2017	Vinimates
Calico Jack's Pirate Raiders		2011	2" Minimates, Vehicles
Celebrity Death Match		2003	3" Minimates
Charm City Cakes		2008	2" Minimates
Comic Book Heroes	Battle Beasts, Chew, Hack / Slash, Ninjak, Revival, Shadowman	2016	2" Minimates
Crouching Tiger, Hidden Dragon		2002	3" Minimates
Cthulhu		2018	Vinimates
Dark Angel		2002	3" Minimates
The Dark Tower		2017	2" Minimates, Vinimates
DC Comics		2004	2" Minimates, 2.5" Minimates, Construction Sets, Vinimates
DC Comics Animated Series	The Batman, Justice League, Teen Titans Go!	2004	2" Minimates, Vinimates
DC Comics Films	Aquaman, Batman Returns, The Dark Knight, The Dark Knight Rises, Justice League, Shazam!, Wonder Woman	2017	Vinimates
DC Comics Television Series	Arrow, Gotham, The Flash, Supergirl	2015	2" Minimates, Vinimates
DC Comics Video Games	Batman: Arkham Asylum, Injustice 2	2018	Vinimates
Desperately Seeking Susan		2008	2" Minimates
Dollars Trilogy	A Fistful of Dollars, For a Few Dollars More, The Good, The Bad, and the Ugly	2008	2" Minimates
Dragon Age		2015	2" Minimates
Dungeons & Dragons	Dungeons & Dragons (TV Series)	2023	2" Minimates
Elf		2017	2" Minimates, Vinimates
The Expendables	The Expendables, The Expendables 2	2012	2" Minimates
Femme Fatales	Darkchylde, Dawn, Lady Death, Tarot	2011	2" Minimates
Forbidden Planet		2017	2" Minimates, Vinimates
G.I. Joe		2021	2" Minimates
Ghostbusters	Ghostbusters, Ghostbusters II, Ghostbusters (2016), The Real Ghostbusters, Ghostbusters: The Video Game	2009	2" Minimates, Vinimates
The Godfather		Unreleased	2" Minimates
Godzilla		2014	2" Minimates, Vinimates
Grimm Fairy Tales		2015	2" Minimates
Halo	Halo: Combat Evolved, Halo 2, Halo 3, Halo 3: ODST	2010	2" Minimates, Vehicles
Indie Comics	Dawn, Kabuki, Magdelena, Witchblade	2005	2" Minimates
Invader Zim		2018	Vinimates
The Iron Giant		2017	2" Minimates, Vinimates
It		2019	Vinimates
iZombie		2016	2" Minimates
John Wick	John Wick (film)	2019	2" Minimates (Unreleased), Vinimates
Kill Bill	Kill Bill: Volume 1, Kill Bill: Volume 2	2014	2" Minimates
Kingdom Hearts		2018	2" Minimates, Vinimates
KISS		2002	3" Minimates
Knight Rider		2012	2" Minimates, Vehicles
Kung Faux		2003	3" Minimates
The Lord of the Rings	The Lord of the Rings: The Fellowship of the Ring, The Lord of the Rings: The Two Towers, The Lord of the Rings: The Return of the King	2004	2" Minimates, 2.5" Minimates, 3" Minimates
Lost in Space			2" Minimates, Vinimates
Marvel Animated Series	Avengers Assemble, Guardians of the Galaxy, Iron Man and Hulk: Heroes United, Marvel's Spider-Man, Ultimate Spider-Man, What If...?	2013	2" Minimates
Marvel Cinematic Universe	Marvel Cinematic Universe: Phase One, Marvel Cinematic Universe: Phase Two, Marvel Cinematic Universe: Phase Three (not including Spider-Man: Far From Home), Black Widow	2008	2" Minimates
Marvel Comics		2003	2" Minimates
Marvel Films	The Amazing Spider-Man, The Amazing Spider-Man 2, Deadpool, Ghost Rider (Unreleased), Logan, Punisher: War Zone, Spider-Man 3, The Wolverine, X-Men: Days of Future Past, X-Men: First Class, X-Men: The Last Stand, X-Men Origins: Wolverine	2006	2" Minimates
Marvel Television Series	Daredevil, Iron Fist, Jessica Jones, Luke Cage	2016	2" Minimates
Marvel vs Capcom 3		2011	2" Minimates
Mass Effect		2014	2" Minimates
Maximum Zombies		2011	2" Minimates
Mighty Morphin Power Rangers		2022	2" Minimates
Mobile Action Xtreme (M.A.X.)		2010	2" Minimates, Carrying Cases, Vehicles
The Munsters		2012	2" Minimates, Vehicles
The Nightmare Before Christmas		2015	2" Minimates, Vinimates
Pathfinder		2014	2" Minimates
Peter Pan		2013	2" Minimates, Vehicles
Pirates of the Caribbean	Pirates of the Caribbean: Dead Men Tell No Tales	2017	2" Minimates, Vinimates
Plants vs. Zombies	Plants vs. Zombies: Garden Warfare	2014	2" Minimates
Platoon		2008	2" Minimates
Pulp Fiction		2014	2" Minimates
Rebel Moon		2024	2" Minimates
Rock n' Roll	Alice Cooper, Iron Maiden, Ozzy Osbourne, Rob Zombie	2002	3" Minimates
The Rocketeer		2020	Vinimates
Rocky		2007	2" Minimates
The Silence of the Lambs		2008	2" Minimates
Sin City			2" Minimates
Skybound	Invincible, Thief of Thieves	2013	2" Minimates
SModCo		2015	Vinimates
Sonic the Hedgehog		2019	2" Minimates, Vinimates
Sony PlayStation	Jak and Daxter, Ratchet and Clank, Resistance, Uncharted 2: Among Thieves	2011	2" Minimates
Speed Racer		2006	2" Minimates, Vehicles
The Spirit		2009	2" Minimates
SpongeBob SquarePants		2015	2" Minimates
Star Trek	Star Trek: Deep Space Nine, Star Trek: Enterprise, Star Trek: First Contact, Star Trek: The Next Generation, Stark Trek: The Original Series, Star Trek: Voyager, Star Trek II: The Wrath of Khan	2002	2" Minimates, 3" Minimates
Street Fighter II (featuring Darksiders)		2006	2" Minimates
Street Fighter x Tekken		2012	2" Minimates
Teenage Mutant Ninja Turtles	Teenage Mutant Ninja Turtles (Comic Book), Teenage Mutant Ninja Turtles (1987), Teenage Mutant Ninja Turtles (2012), Teenage Mutant Ninja Turtles: The Last Ronin	2014	2" Minimates
Terminator 2: Judgement Day		2009	2" Minimates, Vehicles
ThunderCats		2012	2" Minimates
Tomb Raider	Tomb Raider (2013)	2013	2" Minimates
Transformers		2021	2" Minimates
Universal Monsters	Bride of Frankenstein, Creature From the Black Lagoon, Dracula, Frankenstein, The Hunchback of Notre Dame, The Mummy, The Wolf Man	2010	2" Minimates
Valiant Comics	Bloodshot, X-O Manowar	2015	2" Minimates
View Askew	Clerks, Comic Book Men, Jay and Silent Bob Strike Back, Tusk	2014	2" Minimates
The Walking Dead		2012	2" Minimates
Watchmen		2017	2" Minimates, Vinimates
The X-Files		2016	2" Minimates, Vinimates
