= Xavi Giménez =

Spanish cinematographer and film director (born 1970)

- Born: 1970 (age 55–56); Barcelona, Spain
- Occupations: Cinematographer, film director
- Years active: 1991–present
- Notable work: The Machinist; Agora; Penny Dreadful
- Awards: Goya Award for Best Cinematography (2010)

Xavi Giménez (born 1970) is a Spanish cinematographer and occasional film director. He is known for his work in Spanish genre cinema and on international productions, including The Nameless (1999), Intacto (2001), The Machinist (2004), Transsiberian (2008), Agora (2009), Red Lights (2012), The Invisible Guest (2016) and Marrowbone (2017). In 2012, Variety selected him as one of its ten cinematographers to watch.

Giménez won the Goya Award for Best Cinematography for Agora and was previously nominated for Intacto. He has also received two awards for best cinematography at the Sitges Film Festival, for The Nameless and The Machinist.

== Early life and career ==
Giménez was born in Barcelona in 1970. He entered film school intending to study sound, but changed to cinematography during his first month. Early in his career he photographed short films, including Jordi Mollà's Walter Peralta (1993).

His first feature-film credits as director of photography emerged during the 1990s. He became associated with the growth of Spanish horror and fantasy cinema through his collaboration with director Jaume Balagueró and the production company Filmax. Their first feature together, The Nameless, won Giménez the 1999 Sitges award for best cinematography, shared with Yujiro Yajima for Samurai Fiction. Giménez and Balagueró later worked together on the English-language horror films Darkness (2002) and Fragile (2005). A study of contemporary Spanish cinema described the cold, murky photography of The Nameless as an important part of the film's atmosphere.

In 2001, Giménez photographed Juan Carlos Fresnadillo's supernatural thriller Intacto, which brought him his first Goya nomination. His international profile increased with The Machinist, an English-language psychological thriller directed by Brad Anderson. Although set in the United States, it was filmed in and around Barcelona. Its desaturated palette, deep shadows and industrial locations were used to reinforce the protagonist's alienation and deteriorating mental state. Giménez won the 2004 Sitges award for best cinematography for the film. He reunited with Anderson on the thriller Transsiberian.

His other work during the 2000s included Javier Fesser's comedy Mortadelo & Filemon: The Big Adventure (2003), Balagueró's Fragile, Nacho Cerdà's The Abandoned (2006) and Antonio Banderas's Summer Rain (2006).

== Later work ==
Giménez photographed Alejandro Amenábar's historical drama Agora, which was screened out of competition at the 2009 Cannes Film Festival. The production won seven Goya Awards, including best cinematography for Giménez. He later worked on Rodrigo Cortés's Red Lights, Alberto Arvelo's The Liberator, Fernando González Molina's Palm Trees in the Snow, Oriol Paulo's The Invisible Guest and Mirage, and Sergio G. Sánchez's Marrowbone. His later international credits include To Dust (2018), Neil Jordan's Marlowe (2022), Journey to Bethlehem (2023) and Peter Cattaneo's The Penguin Lessons (2024).

For television, Giménez photographed the first two episodes of the series Penny Dreadful, both directed by J. A. Bayona. The pilot episode, "Night Work", won the inaugural First Look television pilots competition at the 2015 Camerimage festival.

Giménez made his feature directing debut with the 2010 drama Cruzando el límite, written by Pere Saballs and produced by Filmax. The film follows a troubled teenager sent to a behavioural rehabilitation centre that uses abusive methods.

== Approach to cinematography ==
Variety has described Giménez's work in terms of dramatic lighting and inventive composition. His work has frequently involved using light, colour and texture to establish a film's psychological or historical environment. For The Machinist, the visual design relied on a restricted, desaturated palette and shadow; the locations around Barcelona were framed to create an intentionally displaced American industrial setting.

For Agora, Giménez and Amenábar chose photochemical film rather than digital capture. Giménez divided the lighting concept into a brighter first part associated with the intellectual world of Hypatia and a darker, more contrast-heavy second part accompanying the rise of religious conflict. He identified the social photography of Sebastião Salgado as one of the production's visual references. Discussing The Penguin Lessons, he described the photography as deliberately simple and restrained, with composition and lighting intended to follow the characters' emotional development.

== Selected filmography ==
=== As cinematographer ===
Year	Title	Director
1998	Genesis (short film)	Nacho Cerdà
1999	The Nameless	Jaume Balagueró
2001	Intacto	Juan Carlos Fresnadillo
2002	Darkness	Jaume Balagueró
2003	Mortadelo & Filemon: The Big Adventure	Javier Fesser
2003	Killing Words	Laura Mañá
2004	The Machinist	Brad Anderson
2005	Fragile	Jaume Balagueró
2006	The Abandoned	Nacho Cerdà
2006	Summer Rain	Antonio Banderas
2008	Transsiberian	Brad Anderson
2009	Agora	Alejandro Amenábar
2012	Red Lights	Rodrigo Cortés
2012	I Want You	Fernando González Molina
2013	The Liberator	Alberto Arvelo
2014	Penny Dreadful (2 episodes)	J. A. Bayona
2015	Palm Trees in the Snow	Fernando González Molina
2016	The Invisible Guest	Oriol Paulo
2017	Marrowbone	Sergio G. Sánchez
2018	Mirage	Oriol Paulo
2018	To Dust	Shawn Snyder
2019	The Legacy of the Bones	Fernando González Molina
2020	Offering to the Storm	Fernando González Molina
2022	Marlowe	Neil Jordan
2023	Journey to Bethlehem	Adam Anders
2024	The Penguin Lessons	Peter Cattaneo

=== As director ===
Year	Title	Notes
2010	Cruzando el límite	Feature directing debut

== Awards and nominations ==
Year	Award	Category	Work	Result
1999	Sitges Film Festival	Best Cinematography	The Nameless	Won (shared)
2002	Goya Awards	Best Cinematography	Intacto	Nominated
2004	Sitges Film Festival	Best Cinematography	The Machinist	Won
2010	Goya Awards	Best Cinematography	Agora	Won
2015	Camerimage	First Look – Best Television Pilot	Penny Dreadful: Night Work	Won
2016	Gaudí Awards	Best Cinematography	Palm Trees in the Snow	Nominated
