= List of Planetary characters =

Planetary is an American comic book limited series created by writer Warren Ellis and artist John Cassaday published by the Wildstorm imprint of DC Comics. Describing themselves as "Archaeologists of the Impossible", Planetary is an organization determined to discover the world's secret history.

== Planetary field team ==
=== Elijah Snow ===
Elijah Snow is initially presented as a vagrant missing many memories of his past. Snow is recruited as an investigator for the Planetary field team by Jakita Wagner. Possessing the ability of heat subtraction (cryokinesis), Snow assists the Planetary team. Snow's memories eventually return and he realizes that he is in fact a Century Baby (all born on January 1, 1900, and exhibiting radically decreased aging and other superhuman abilities), and that his recruitment was not the beginning of his history with Planetary; he is in fact the enigmatic Fourth Man who created Planetary.

IGN named him 54th of the Top 100 Comic Book Heroes.

=== Jakita Wagner ===
During Elijah Snow's absence, metahuman Jakita Wagner is the field leader for the Planetary team. Eventually revealed to be the daughter of Lord Blackstock (another Century Baby) and a scientist in the hidden African city of Opak-Re (a reference to the Lost City of Opar, from Tarzan's novels) the infant was abandoned due to the forbidden nature of their union. Having loved her mother, Snow arranges for the infant's adoption by a German couple (hinted to be the same couple that raised The High of the Wildstorm Universe). Jakita develops superhuman abilities (e.g. enhanced strength, speed, and senses), but also possesses a very low tolerance for boredom, a trait Snow characterizes as having been inherited from both of her parents.

=== The Drummer ===
The Drummer is the information gathering specialist of the Planetary field team, with his code name referring to the drum sticks he uses to aid his concentration. He was initially one of several children who were orphaned and kidnapped by the Four, due to the children's ability to communicate with and control electronic systems, and also gain information directly from their surroundings. The Four were planning to use these children to gain control over the Internet. When the Planetary field team attempted to free the captive children, they are killed by Four agents, with Jakita Wagner only able to save the Drummer. He is then adopted by Snow and recruited into Planetary.

=== Ambrose Chase ===
Ambrose Chase was a Planetary field team member, and the son of a test subject from Science City Zero, an experimentation center created by the Four's Randall Dowling. Born with the ability to distort spacetime, gravity, and other aspects of physics in his immediate vicinity, Chase was recruited by Snow, and assumed leadership of the field team when Snow left Planetary. A team was confronting a group that planned to raid fiction stories for profit. Chase is seemingly killed during this mission but he has managed to 'freeze' himself. With the aid of the Planetary group, Chase returns.

== The Four ==
The Four are the principal antagonists of Planetary. Randall Dowling, Kim Süskind, William Leather and Jacob Greene are four astronauts who disappear during a space expedition and reappear with metahuman abilities (a reference to Marvel Comics' Fantastic Four). The Four then act as a covert organization and begin to hoard the world's secrets for themselves.

=== Randall Dowling ===
The leader of the Four. The creator of Science City Zero (a project involving experimentation on political dissidents, which often resulted in mutations), Dowling uses a secret military project to launch the Four into space, and secretly brokers a bargain with an alien race to gain metahuman abilities. In return, Dowling promises the alien beings the Earth. Dowling himself has the ability to "stretch" his mind, and "pilfer" information from the minds of those who have been in his proximity. This stretching ability is a nod to Mr. Fantastic's body-stretching powers.

=== Kim Süskind ===
Randall Dowling's lover and the daughter of a Nazi rocket scientist, Süskind participated in Dowling's space expedition. Endowed with the powers of invisibility and force field generation (like the Fantastic Four's Invisible Woman), Süskind is Dowling's principal assassin. She wears special goggles that Dowling invented for her; these goggles enable her to see when using her powers, as light passes through an invisible woman's eyes.

=== William Leather ===
Leather's mother, Miriam, was the wife of Bret Leather, a Century Baby and costumed adventurer. As Miriam was unfaithful to her husband, Leather was cheated of his birthright and did not inherit his father's abilities. Leather then joins Dowling, having been promised true power. Courtesy of the space expedition Leather participates in, he receives amplified strength, durability and energy projection, the latter his point of similarity to the Fantastic Four's Human Torch. He is Dowling's primary field operative as Greene is reserved for only the most dangerous missions and Süskind typically participates only in clandestine operations. At some point prior to the story, Leather killed someone dear to Elijah Snow. He is eventually captured by Planetary and tortured by Snow into revealing the location of Süskind and Dowling. The last mention of him is near the end of the series when Snow tells Jakita and the Drummer that he is undergoing mental rehabilitation to restore his personality as well as physical therapy to restore his eyes. What Snow plans to do with him after his recovery is unknown.

=== Jacob Greene ===
A former World War II fighter pilot, Greene participated in Randall Dowling's space expedition and was mutated into an immensely durable but hideous being (similar to the Fantastic Four's Thing). Barely capable of speech, Greene remained in seclusion unless required by Dowling to engage in extremely hazardous missions.

== Supporting characters ==
=== Axel Brass ===
An adventurer and Century Baby, Axel Brass is also a member of the Secret Society (others include the Aviator; Bret Leather; Thomas Edison, the inventor; Hark, an Asian mastermind; Jimmy, a U.S spy; and Lord Blackstock). In 1945 the Society builds a quantum computer, which appears as a manifestation of the multiverse. With the exception of Brass, the entire Society is killed preventing an invasion of his dimension by a group of superhumans meant to correspond to DC Comics' Justice League, whose own dimension is on the verge of destruction. Crippled in the battle, Brass watches over the computer for over four decades until rescued by the Planetary field team. Brass recuperates in a Planetary hospital and acts as an adviser and confidant to Elijah Snow. Brass's character is an homage to Doc Savage.

=== Anna Hark ===
Like Jakita Wagner, Anna Hark is the daughter of a Century Baby and Secret Society member (Hark). Heir to the Hark Legacy, Anna is Jim Wilder's employer and manipulates him into becoming a metahuman. Despite having manipulated Wilder, she cares for him a great deal, routinely calling him to see if he is eating properly as well as warmly embracing him after he had been away. Eventually, she is convinced by Elijah Snow to ally with Planetary and spread the resources previously hoarded by The Four. Her father is an homage to Fu Manchu, the clever crime lord character by Sax Rohmer, making her an homage to Fah Lo Suee, and possibly Shang-Chi.

=== John Stone ===
A spy and sometime confidant of Snow. He is nearly as old as Snow yet appears to be no older than 50. Revealed to be an unwilling agent of the Four, he was eventually saved by Snow. He began his career in espionage with the OSS during World War II. According to Snow, Stone essentially invented psychological operations. It is revealed that the reason he does not age is because of some remedy and/or technological enhancement the Four shared with him. Stone is an homage to Marvel's Nick Fury and Ian Fleming's James Bond.

John Stone also has a strange right hand, which he calls "The Devil's Paw". This hand might well be inspired by Michael Moorcock's Corum Jhaelen Irsei - Moorcock's name appears on a streetsign in an earlier issue. This could also be a reference to the Satan Claw, signature weapon of Nick Fury's rival Baron Strucker.

=== Jim Wilder ===
An agent of the Hark Corporation, and sent by employer Anna Hark to investigate an alien device found in the foundations of a building. On coming into contact with the device Wilder is transformed into a metahuman and learns that the device is called a "travelstone", and part of the emergency escape system of a sentient spacecraft. Learning that the vessel requires living beings to perform functions such as fuel, propulsion and navigation, Wilder locates other metahumans from an experiment called Science City Zero who serve as the components of the ship and allow it to leave Earth with its new crew. It is eventually revealed that Hark - operating in conjunction with John Stone - engineered Wilder's initial encounter with the travelstone. Wilder is an homage to Captain Marvel.

=== Lord Blackstock ===
Kevin Sack, also known as Lord Blackstock, is a Century Baby and the father of Jakita Wagner. He came of age in Africa, and at some point befriended the people of Opak-re, a technologically advanced society hidden deep in the African jungle. After returning to England as a young adult, he found that his family had purchased a noble title. Elijah Snow first met him during his expedition to Opak-re; with Blackstock's help, Snow gained entry into the city and befriended its citizens. He later fathered Jakita with Anaykah, a beautiful scientist from Opak-re (and originally Snow's lover). An ally of both Axel Brass and Elijah Snow, Blackstock is killed attempting to fight off the Bleed invaders. Blackstock is a metahuman Tarzan analogue, and the name is similar to Tarzan's own, Lord Greystoke; while his other name, Kevin Sack, is similar to Kevin Plunder, Marvel Comics' own Tarzan analogue. Snow did not think highly of Blackstock, referring to him as a "piece of crap" years after his death when telling Jakita about him.

=== Anaykah ===
A brilliant scientist from the hidden and technologically advanced African city of Opak-re. She and Elijah Snow became lovers during the latter's journey to Opak-re in the early 1930s. After Elijah departed the city to continue exploring the world, she and Blackstock began an affair which led to the birth of their daughter, Jakita Wagner. Elijah returned to Opak-re to find that she and her child had been exiled from the city as it is forbidden for Opak-re's citizens to reproduce with outsiders. Anaykah entrusted her infant daughter to Elijah, believing him to be a loving man and that she knows he will do what is right. She then returned to Opak-re in the hopes that her people would forgive her. Elijah remembers her as the first true love of his life.

=== Bret Leather ===
Son of John Leather (AKA the Dead Ranger, a reference to the Lone Ranger, further referencing how John Reid is the great-uncle to Britt Reid), Bret Leather was a Century Baby and a member of Axel Brass' superhuman cabal. His father having been a Texas Ranger, Bret grew up with a firm respect for the law. After inheriting a fortune from his father, Bret moved from Texas to Chicago and funded a progressive newspaper. Growing bored with the socialite lifestyle, he decided to take advantage of his superpowers and fight crime as The Spider; his outfit consisted of a pitch black duster and Stetson with a metallic mask to cover his face. Always busy fighting crime, he never bothered much with his wife. As a result she had an affair with a loan shark, leading to the birth of Bret's "son", William Leather. With the exception of Brass, he and the rest of the superhuman cabal were killed by the Bleed invaders. He is meant to be an homage to pulp magazine antiheroes like the Green Hornet, the Shadow and the Spider.

=== Hark ===
A Century Baby from Asia and a member of Axel Brass' superhuman cabal, Hark is dead by the start of the main storyline. While his past is never explored in any significant detail, Hark was a super genius whose power and influence threatened global stability; years after his death, Brass recalls him as the greatest mind that ever came out of Asia. He and Brass originally met as enemies, but Brass was able to convince Hark that instead of fighting each other they should cooperate towards a better world for both their homelands. With the exception of Brass, he and the rest of the superhuman cabal were killed by the Bleed invaders. He is the father of Anna Hark, a Secret Society member and an exponentially powerful corporate figure allied with Planetary. He is possibly meant as an homage to Yellow Peril anti-heroes such as Sax Rohmer's Fu Manchu.

== See also ==
- Planetary (comics)
