= Diamond Select Toys =

American Toy Company

Diamond Select Toys and Collectibles, LLC
- Company type: Private
- Industry: Entertainment
- Founded: 1999
- Defunct: 2025; 1 year ago
- Fate: Filled into bankruptcy; assets acquired by Ad Populum
- Headquarters: Timonium, MD, United States
- Key people: Chuck Terceira (Director); Robert Yee (Legal Affairs)
- Products: Action figures
- Parent: Geppi Family Enterprises
- Divisions: Art Asylum

Diamond Select Toys and Collectibles, LLC was an action figure and sculpture manufacturer of the United States. The company was founded in 1999 by sister company Diamond Comics Distributors to create collectibles for adult collectors, and has since licensed a variety of pop culture properties, including Marvel Comics, Star Wars, Star Trek, Transformers, Ghostbusters, Halo, G.I. Joe: A Real American Hero, Buffy the Vampire Slayer, Indiana Jones, Battlestar Galactica, 24, The Muppets and Back to the Future. While they made collectibles in numerous product categories, including action figures, plush, banks, busts, statues and prop replicas, many of their licensed properties were released in the form of Minimates mini-figures.

In 2025, Diamond Comic Distributors filed with chapter 11 bankruptcy and Diamond Select Toys was sold off to Ad Populum, which shut it down in May 2025.

== Product lines ==
=== Minimates ===
Minimates were created by New York-based design house Art Asylum, who produced them at a 3-inch scale on their own beginning in 2002, then in 2-inch and 2.5-inch scales in partnership with other companies. Already a manufacturer of Marvel action figures and statues, Diamond Select Toys brought their Marvel license to the table to create Marvel Minimates, and the 2-inch line was launched in 2003. The 2-inch Minimate has since become the lone remaining body type, and the Marvel line is still active to this day, with 41 waves released in the main series, making it the longest-running superhero toy line in history. In 2007, after years of partnership, Diamond Select Toys acquired select assets of Art Asylum, and DST has since developed Minimates based on its own concepts, under the brands Calico Jack's Pirate Raiders and Minimates M.A.X. Both lines incorporate vehicles, and as such a line of Minimate Vehicles has been made available featuring Pirate Raiders and M.A.X alongside licenses like Terminator 2: Judgment Day and Back to the Future.

=== Marvel Select and other lines ===
The 7-inch scale Marvel Select line was originally developed by DST in 2002 with Marvel Comics' toy division, Toy Biz, as a specialty-market counterpart to the larger company's mass-market offerings. Diamond Select handled design, sales and marketing, while Toy Biz handled development and production. At the time, the figures were mostly based on peripheral Ultimate Marvel and Marvel Knights characters. DST eventually took over development and production from Toy Biz and the line expanded to include core Marvel characters.

Early Marvel Select figures focused on sculpting over articulation and typically included detailed, diorama-style bases that required large packaging. These bases were sometimes reduced in size or omitted completely to accommodate figures of larger characters like the Hulk, which could fill the packaging on their own. Over time, the amount of articulation per figure increased, but the large bases became uncommon. Instead, more accessories and interchangeable parts began to be included.

DST has also used the "Select" label for other lines, to indicate that they are in the same 7-inch scale. Universal Monsters was the second Select line, The Munsters was the third, and Alice: Madness Returns the fourth. The defunct Star Trek action figure line was relaunched in 2013 as Star Trek Select. All Universal Monsters, Munsters and Star Trek Selects also received non-Select releases at Toys "R" Us, with the larger accessory pieces removed and sometimes replaced by different, smaller ones.

=== Femme Fatales and Gallery PVC statues ===
The Femme Fatales line of 9-inch PVC statues began by licensing popular female characters from independent comic books, including Dawn and Tarot: Witch of the Black Rose. DST then expanded the line's scope by creating their own interpretations of female characters from popular fiction and history, including Little Red Riding Hood, Alice, Anne Bonny, Medusa and Snow White (Bo Peep was unreleased). Other licensed characters include Darkchylde, Lady Death, Kabuki and Alice (from Alice: Madness Returns), and future releases include Atom Eve from Invincible and Seven of Nine from Star Trek: Voyager. (Some Femme Fatales characters have been released as Minimates, too.)

Diamond started releasing Femme Fatales statues based on female characters from Batman: The Animated Series in 2015. However, Diamond started branding both female and male PVC statues under the Gallery label. Similarly, Diamond's PVC statues of Marvel characters (both comics- and MCU-based) are branded under the Gallery label.

=== Resin busts ===
Diamond makes resin busts for some of their licenses. Recent ones include Spider-Man based on his appearance in Spider-Man: Homecoming and characters from Batman: The Animated Series.

=== Premier Collection and Milestones resin statues ===
Diamond also makes mid-range resin statues. These are typically larger than the PVC statues, both in terms of size and overall complexity.

== Licenses ==
- Alice: Madness Returns - Minimates, Select action figures, Femme Fatales PVC statues
- Aliens - Minimates, electronic vehicles
- All Elite Wrestling - Minimates, vinyl figures, PVC statues, statues
- Back to the Future - Minimates, Minimate vehicles, electronic vehicles, prop replicas, silicone trays
- Dawn - Minimates, Femme Fatales PVC statues, Retro action figures
- Darkchylde - Minimates, Femme Fatales PVC statues
- DC Comics - Minimates, Femme Fatales PVC statues, Gallery PVC statues, Premier Collection resin statues
- Domo - Banks, bottle openers, license plates
- The Expendables - Minimates, action figures, bottle openers
- Ghostbusters - Minimates, light-up statues, banks, silicone trays, gelatin molds
- Gotham- Minimates, Gotham Select action figures
- Kabuki - Minimates, Demme Datales PVC Statues
- Knight Rider - Minimate vehicles, electronic vehicles, prop replicas
- Lady Death - Minimates, Femme Fatales PVC statues
- Bruce Lee - Minimates, Vinimates, Select action figures, PVC statues, resin statues, resin busts
- Lenore, the Cute Little Dead Girl - Bank, PVC statues, silicone trays
- Lost in Space - Minimates, electronic toys
- Marvel Comics - Minimates, Marvel Select action figures, bottle openers, silicone trays, neon signs
- Marvel Studios - Minimates, Marvel Select action figures
- Marvel vs. Capcom 3 - Minimates
- The Munsters - Select action figures, Minimate vehicles
- The Muppets - Minimates, Select action figures, drinking glasses
- Pathfinder - Minimates, plush
- The Real Ghostbusters - Minimates
- Star Trek - Minimates, Minimate vehicles, Select action figures, electronic ships, electronic accessories, Retro action figures, Granix artwork
- Star Wars - Banks, bottle openers, neon signs, Ultimate Quarter Scale action figures (retired)
- Street Fighter X Tekken - Minimates
- Tarot: Witch of the Black Rose - Minimates, Femme Fatales PVC statues
- Tomb Raider - Minimates
- Universal Monsters - Minimates, Select action figures, Retro action figures, banks
- The Walking Dead - Minimates, banks, bottle openers, silicone trays, gelatin molds
- 24
- Alien vs. Predator
- Archie Comics
- Angel
- Army of Darkness
- Beowulf
- Buffy the Vampire Slayer
- Darkstalkers
- Edward Scissorhands
- G.I. Joe: A Real American Hero
- The Godfather
- Halo
- Hellboy
- Indiana Jones
- Kabuki
- Man With No Name Trilogy
- Mouse Guard
- Office Space
- Planet of the Apes
- PlayStation
- Rocky
- Serenity
- The Silence of the Lambs
- The Spirit
- Stargate
- Street Fighter
- Terminator 2: Judgment Day
- Transformers
- Battle Beasts
