= Joseph Michael Linsner =

American comics creator

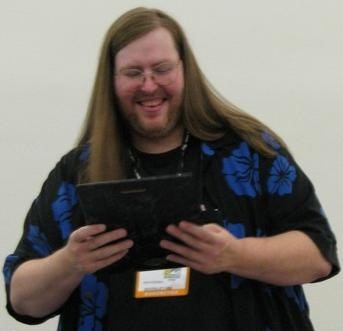
- Joseph Michael Linsner in 2007
- Born: December 13, 1968 (age 57) Queens, New York, U.S.
- Areas: Writer, Penciller, Colourist
- Notable works: Dawn
- Awards: Inkpot Award, 2007
- Spouse: Kristina Deak-Linsner

Joseph Michael Linsner (born December 13, 1968) is an American comic book writer/artist, known as the creator of the mature-audiences supernatural character Dawn, and for his illustrations of female characters. He is a popular cover artist in the comics industry.

== Early life ==
Linsner was born in Queens, New York, one of three brothers. His father died when Joseph was 14 years old. Linsner grew up with a fascination for Batman, the X-Men, Conan the Barbarian, and the pinup artist Alberto Vargas. Later influences included Alan Moore, Pat Mills, and David Cronenberg.

== Career ==
Linsner introduced the lingerie-wearing occult character Dawn in Cry for Dawn, a nine-issue series self-published by Linsner and Joseph M. Monks' Cry for Dawn Productions beginning in 1989. Cry For Dawn Productions dissolved in late 1993, and Linsner took Dawn to Sirius Entertainment; Dawn was published by Sirius for several limited series and one-shots from 1995 to 2000.

Linsner broke into mainstream comics drawing the cover of Justice League Quarterly #13 (Winter 1993). His Marvel Comics work includes the one-shot Killraven #1 (Feb. 2001), several covers for the company's mid-2000s Mystique series, and painted covers and interior penciling and inking for the Wolverine-Black Cat three-issue limited series Claws (Oct.-Dec., 2006), followed in 2011 by the three-issue limited series Wolverine & Black Cat: Claws 2 (Aug.–Nov., 2011).

In 2002, Linsner self-published I Love New York, a benefit book for the American Red Cross following the September 11 attacks; the comic presents his perceptions as a native New Yorker on that day.

Image Comics released the 176-page paperback The Art of Joseph Michael Linsner (ISBN 978-1582403250) in October 2003.

He provided the illustrations for the 2007 book Our Gods Wear Spandex: The Secret History of Comic Book Heroes by Christopher Knowles (ISBN 1-57863-406-7).

Linsner drew the cover of Dark Fantasy Productions' Dark Fantasy #1 (1994). He drew the cover of the crossover one-shot Witchblade/The Punisher #1 (June 2007), and has also done painted comic book cover art for Topps Comics, Dark Horse Comics, and others. He did his first cover for Dynamite Entertainment in 2007 (Red Sonja), and since 2012 has been one of the company's most prolific cover artists, mainly for its collections of comics featuring such licensed characters as Red Sonja, Vampirella, Bettie Page, Elvira: Mistress of the Dark, Dejah Thoris, and Jennifer Blood.

Linsner has a lengthy association with The Hero Initiative, the not-for-profit organization dedicated to helping comic book creators, writers, and artists in need.

== Controversy ==
In 2013, in the pages of a Dawn comic, Linsner accused his former assistant Eva Hopkins of acquiring and selling his original pages without his consent. Hopkins denied the allegations, and an online war of words erupted between the two creators.

== Personal life ==
Linsner is married to Kristina Deak-Linsner.

== Awards and honors ==
Linsner was nominated for the 1997 Eisner Award for Best Painter/Digital Artist.

He was given an Inkpot Award at the 2007 San Diego Comic-Con. Along with Herb Trimpe and Greg Land, Linsner was a guest of honor at the 2008 Toronto Comic Con.

== Bibliography ==
- Cry for Dawn #1–9 (Cry for Dawn Productions, 1989–1991)
- Subtle Violents (Cry for Dawn Productions, 1991)
- Drama (Sirius Entertainment, 1994)
- Angry Christ Comix (Sirius Entertainment, 1994)
- Eleven or One: An Angry Christ Comic (Sirius Entertainment, 1995)
- Dawn #1–5 (Sirius Entertainment, 1995–1996)
- Crypt of Dawn #1–6 (Sirius Entertainment, 1996–1999)
  - collected in The Best of Crypt of Dawn (Sirius Entertainment, Inc., 2000)
- Dawn: Lucifer's Halo #1 (Sirius Entertainment, Nov. 1997, ISBN 1-57989-014-8) — collects material from Drama (Sirius Entertainment, 1994) and Dawn (Sirius Entertainment, 1995)
- Dawn 1/2: Dreams of Dawn (Sirius Entertainment, 1999)
- Dawn 1/2 (Sirius Entertainment/Wizard, 2000)
- Dawn: the Return of the Goddess (Sirius Entertainment, 1999–2000)
- Killraven #1 (Marvel Comics, Feb. 2001)
- Dark Ivory #0 (Linsner.com, Winter 2001) — co-created and co-written with Eva Hopkins
- I Love New York (Lisner.com, 2002)
- Dawn: Three Tiers #1–6 (Image Comics, 2003–2005)
- Claws #1–3 (Marvel Comics, 2006)
- Dark Ivory #1–4 (Image Comics, 2008–2009) — co-written with Eva Hopkins
- Dawn: Not to Touch the Earth (Image Comics, 2010)
- Wolverine & Black Cat: Claws 2 #1–3 (Marvel Comics, 2011)
- Dawn: The Swordmaster's Daughter (Image Comics 2013)
- Sin Boldly (Image Comics, 2013)
- Dawn/Vampirella #1–5 (Dynamite Entertainment, 2014–2015)
  - collected in Dawn/Vampirella (Dynamite Entertainment, 2019)
- Harley Quinn #4, 10, 15, 16, 20 (DC Comics, 2015–2017) — a few pages in each issue
