= I Am Legion (comics) =

- Cover of I Am Legion #1 (January 2009), art by John Cassaday.

Publication information
- Publisher: Les Humanoïdes Associés; Humanoids Publishing; DC Comics; Devil's Due Productions
- Schedule: Monthly
- Format: Limited series
- Genre: War; Vampire
- Publication date: January – July 2009
- No. of issues: 6

Creative team
- Created by: Fabien Nury; John Cassaday
- Written by: Fabien Nury
- Artist: John Cassaday
- Letterer: Chris Crank
- Colourist: Laura Martin
- Editor: Cody DeMatteis

Collected editions
- I Am Legion: ISBN 978-1-934692-65-3

I Am Legion (French: Je suis légion) is a French comic book series written by Fabien Nury, drawn by John Cassaday and published by Les Humanoïdes Associés, then in English by Humanoids Publishing/DC Comics and later by Humanoids/Devil's Due Productions.

== Publication history ==
The series was originally published by Les Humanoïdes Associés in three albums, Le faune dansant (The Dancing Faun, June 2004), Vlad (January 2006) and Les trois singes (The Three Monkeys, November 2007). This was then translated into English by Justin Kelly and was originally released in 2004 by the American-based arm of Humanoïdes, Humanoids Publishing, through their deal with DC Comics but only one prestige format book was released. The series was later split into six comic books under a new deal between Humanoids and Devil's Due Productions and finally fully released in 2009.

== Plot ==
During World War II, Nazis seek to capture and control 10-year-old vampire named Ana. Meanwhile, Allied forces try to uncover Nazis that have infiltrated their ranks.

== Real world references ==
The history makes liberal use of references to real world (historical) characters, including among others Wilhelm Canaris (also referred to by the codename "Trinity"), Field Marshal Günther von Kluge, Winston Churchill, Vlad Tepes and Radu cel Frumos.

Real world organizations referenced include the London Controlling Section, the Abwehr and the Special Operations Executive. A main character is a Colonel Von Kleist, perhaps a reference to Paul von Kleist. The Casablanca Conference and the Wannsee Conference are also mentioned.

== Collected editions ==
- I Am Legion (trade paperback, 144 pages, October 2009, ISBN 978-1-934692-65-3)
- I Am Legion (hardcover, September 2010, ISBN 9781594650994)

== Awards ==
John Cassaday won the 2005 "Best Penciller/Inker or Penciller/Inker Team" Eisner Award in part for his work on this title (as well as Astonishing X-Men and Planetary).

== Film ==
A live-action film adaptation is in the works, with Nacho Cerda due to direct and based on a script written by Richard Stanley.
