= John Cassaday =

American comic book artist and writer (1971–2024)

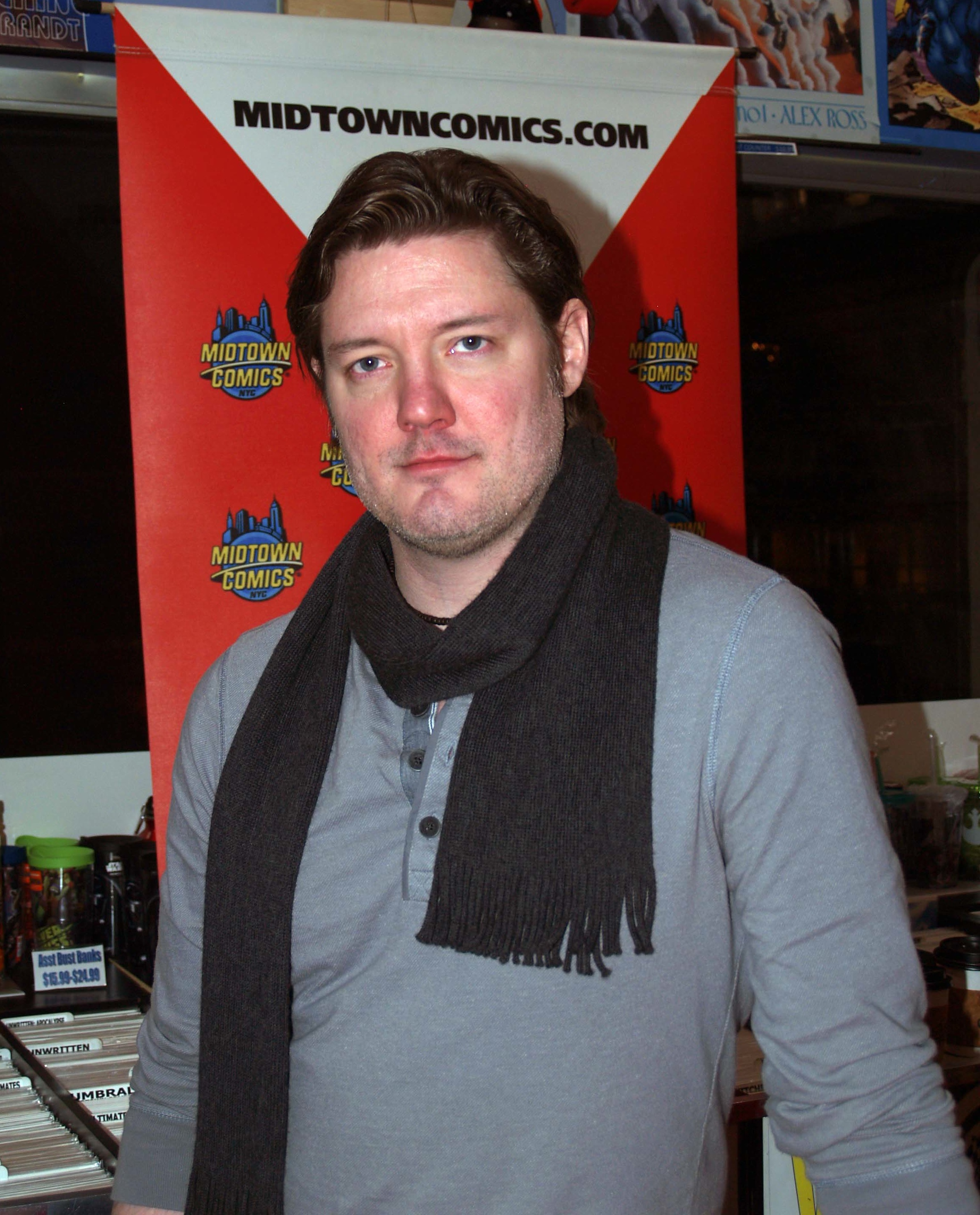
- Cassaday in 2015
- Born: December 14, 1971 Fort Worth, Texas, U.S.
- Died: September 9, 2024 (aged 52) New York City, U.S.
- Areas: Artist, writer, television director
- Notable works: Planetary; Astonishing X-Men; Captain America
- Awards: Eisner Award (2005, 2006), Scream Award (2007)

Johnny Mac Cassaday (/ˈkæsədeɪ/; December 14, 1971 – September 9, 2024) was an American comic book artist, writer, and television director. He was best known for his work on the critically acclaimed Planetary with writer Warren Ellis, where his art style conveyed a sense of realism despite that book's fantastical settings. His later works included Astonishing X-Men with Joss Whedon, Captain America with John Ney Rieber, and Star Wars with Jason Aaron.

Both Marvel Comics and DC Comics include many of Cassaday's iconic images in their marketing, and in their art and poster book collections. Marvel Comics-based animated films have made extensive use of his art. He received multiple Eagle and Eisner Awards and nominations for his work.

== Early life ==
Johnny Mac Cassaday was born on December 14, 1971, in Fort Worth, Texas. A self-taught illustrator, Cassaday listed his influences as, among others, NC Wyeth, classic pulp magazine-culture iconography, and popular music. Cassaday studied film in school, calling it "an equal passion to comics."

== Career ==
=== Comics ===
Cassaday directed television news in Texas for five years before moving to New York. He spent one summer working a construction job while working on his portfolio in preparation for San Diego Comic-Con.

In 1994 Cassaday broke into the comic book industry with a one-page illustration and a short story for Boneyard Press.

In 1996, at San Diego Comic-Con, Cassaday showed his portfolio to popular comic book writer and editor Mark Waid, who recommended him to writer Jeff Mariotte, with whom Cassaday would create the series Desperadoes, a Weird West series that was published from 1997 - 2002. Waid recalled, "I refuse to take any real credit for 'discovering' John Cassaday. I can't take credit for having functioning eyeballs." Soon after, Cassaday began receiving job offers from bigger publishers. He quit his construction job and left Texas for New York.

In December 1996 he produced art for Dark Horse Comics' Ghost. Within a year, he was hired to be the regular artist on Homage Comics' Desperadoes.

In late 1997 Cassaday was hired by DC and Marvel as artist on the Teen Titans and Flash annuals, X-Men/Alpha Flight, and Union Jack. His work on X-Men made him one of the title's most popular artists.

In 1999, Cassaday and writer Warren Ellis created Planetary for WildStorm Productions. Relating the manner in which the episodic series would feature different settings in each issue, Ellis, recalled in 2024, "John said he'd love to try a monthly series, but hated the idea of having to draw the same thing every issue." To this end, the stories revolved around concepts as diverse as Doc Savage analogues, an island of monsters reminiscent of Japanese kaiju films, the ghost of a murdered Chinese police officer, and a doppelgänger of Marilyn Monroe who was subjected to scientific experiments by the government. Cassaday's covers for the series were designed like movie posters, with the book's logo reimaginzed for each issue. He also modeled the character Drummer after himself.

Cassaday subsequently worked on other titles for various publishers, including Gen^{13}, Superman/Batman, The Hulk, and The Avengers. He worked on multiple Captain America projects, including an issue of Fallen Son: The Death of Captain America written by Jeph Loeb.

He based his cover art on World War II propaganda posters. Marvel released the covers in a series of poster art books. He has also created covers for comic books featuring The Phantom, for US publisher Moonstone Books and the European Egmont, as well as covers for Joss Whedon's Firefly spinoff comic Serenity: Those Left Behind, and Guy Ritchie's Gamekeeper. He handled covers and art direction on Dynamite Entertainment's The Lone Ranger comic-book series. Books featuring his art include Wizard's PosterMania!, Women of Marvel Poster Book, Wolverine Poster Book, New Avengers Poster Book, three editions of the Captain America Poster Book, and DC Comics Covergirls. In 1999, he provided black-and-white interior illustrations for the novel Gen^{13}: Netherwar, by Christopher Golden and Jeff Mariotte, published by Ace Books.

From 2004 to 2008, Cassaday illustrated the graphic novel trilogy Je suis légion by Fabien Nury from Les Humanoïdes Associés. The English language edition was published as an eight issue comic series I Am Legion by Devil's Due Publishing. In July 2006, Humanoïdes announced a co-production deal with Pierre Spengler for a screen adaptation of the work. At the 2015 Cannes Film Festival, it was announced that the three picture series would be directed by Nacho Cerda with a screenplay by Richard Stanley.

Cassaday wrote stories for Hellboy: Weird Tales, Little Nemo: Dream Another Dream, Rocketeer Adventures, X-Men: Alpha Flight, Bela Lugosi: Takes from the Grave, and Union Jack. He also wrote drawing instruction articles for Wizard Magazine's Wizard: How to Draw.

John Cassaday appeared in the Captain America 75th Anniversary television special on ABC in January 2016. That same year he provided the art on the Captain America special anniversary issue. and re-teamed with Joss Whedon on a story featuring Sam Wilson in Captain America: Sam Wilson #7.

Cassaday headlined the highly successful 2015 Star Wars revival at Marvel Comics. The book became the #1 selling comic for 2015. According to Forbes magazine, it was the top-selling comic of the last 20 years, having sold approximately one million copies.

=== Film and television ===
==== Work ====
Cassaday's art appeared in an episode of HBO First Look, a 2003 documentary about the making of the Daredevil film.

He worked as a concept artist on the film adaptation of Alan Moore and Dave Gibbons' classic graphic novel Watchmen.

In 2009, the Astonishing X-Men animated DVD series was adapted as a motion comic from Cassaday's art for the comic book series written by Joss Whedon.

Cassaday directed "The Attic", the December 18, 2009 episode of the television series Dollhouse, which aired as the tenth episode of that series' second season.

Cassaday's art was used extensively in the Futureal Studio documentary Adventures into Digital Comics (2010).

==== Onscreen appearances ====
Cassaday himself appeared in a Wizard World-sponsored documentary in 2002. He also appeared in Generation X: The Comic Book History of the X-Men, a 2006 DVD documentary about the X-Men franchise.

As an actor, Cassaday appeared in small roles in the 2012 horror film House on the Hill and ITV Playhouse.

== Technique and materials ==
In addition to penciling and inking his interior comics pages, Cassaday did his cover work in ink and charcoal, working with frequent collaborator Laura Martin, who digitally colored most of his covers. He credited the challenges of working on complicated books like Planetary with making him a better artist.

== Personal life and death ==
Cassaday's partner was Tara A. Martinez.

Cassaday died from cardiac arrest in a Manhattan hospital on September 9, 2024, at the age of 52. He was survived by his mother and a sister, Robin Cassaday, his father having died of cancer in 1990.

== Awards ==
=== Wins ===
- 2005 Eisner Award for Best Penciller/Inker for Astonishing X-Men, Planetary, and I Am Legion: The Dancing Faun (tied with illustrator Frank Quitely)
- 2005 Wizard World Fan Award for Favorite Penciller (Astonishing X-Men, Planetary)
- 2006 Eisner Award for Best Penciller/Inker for Astonishing X-Men and Planetary
- 2006 Eisner Award for Best Ongoing Series for Astonishing X-Men (with Joss Whedon)
- 2006 Eagle Award for Favourite Comics Artist: Pencils
- 2007 Spike TV Scream Award for Best Comic-Book Artist

=== Nominations ===
- 2000 Eisner Award Best Cover Artist for Planetary
- 2002 Eisner Award Best Penciler/Inker for Planetary
- 2004 Eagle Award Favourite Comics Artist: Pencils
- 2007 Eisner Award Best Cover Artist Astonishing X-Men and Lone Ranger
- 2008 Eisner Award for Best Cover Artist Astonishing X-Men and Lone Ranger
- 2010 Eisner Award for Best Cover Artist Irredeemable and Lone Ranger

== Bibliography ==
=== Boneyard Press ===
- Bill the Bull: One Shot, One Bourbon, One Beer #1 ("Justin") (Boneyard Press, 1994)
- Flowers on the Razorwire #5–6 (Boneyard Press, 1995)

=== Caliber Comics ===
- Negative Burn #28 ("Juju Eyes") (Caliber Comics, 1995)

=== CFD Productions ===
- No Profit for the Wise #5–6 (CFD Productions, 1996)

=== Dark Horse ===
- Ghost #27 (June 1997)
  - Ghost: Black October, Dark Horse, 1999, ISBN 1-56971-377-4
- Hellboy: Weird Tales, miniseries, #1–8 (among other artists) (2003–04)
  - Hellboy Weird Tales volumes 1 and 2, Dark Horse, 2003, ISBN 1-56971-622-6, 2004, ISBN 1-56971-953-5

=== DC ===
- Just Imagine Stan Lee with John Cassaday creating Crisis (2002)
- Flash, vol. 2, Annual #10 (1997)
- I Am Legion: The Dancing Faun (2004)
- Planetary #1–27 (1999–2009)
- Planetary/Batman: Night on Earth (2003)
- Superman/Batman #26 (among other artists) (2006)
- Teen Titans Annual #1 (1997)
- Transmetropolitan: I Hate It Here (among other artists) (2000)
- Action Comics #1000: Faster Than A Speeding Bullet (2018)

=== Image ===
- C-23 #6 (1998)
- Desperadoes: A Moment's Sunlight. miniseries #1–5 (Homage Comics/WildStorm, 1997–1998)
  - Desperadoes: A Moment's Sunlight tpb, 104 pages, Homage Comics/WildStorm, 1998, ISBN 1-58240-013-X
- Desperadoes: Epidemic!. One-shot, Homage Comics/WildStorm, 1999 — artwork laid out by Cassady, drawn by John Lucas
- Gen13 #33 (1998)
- Reborn #1 (variant cover art, October 2016)

=== Marvel ===
- Astonishing X-Men #1–24, Giant-Sized #1 (2004–2008)
  - Astonishing X-Men Omnibus (2009) ISBN 978-0785138013
  - Astonishing X-Men by Joss Whedon and John Cassaday Ultimate Collection (2012) ISBN 978-0785161943
  - Astonishing X-Men Ultimate Collection Book 2 (2012) ISBN 978-0785161950
- Captain America, #1–6 (2002)
- Captain America: Marvel Knights Volume I (2016) ISBN 978-0785196334
- Captain America: The New Deal (2010) ISBN 978-0785149644
  - Fallen Son: The Death of Captain America (Iron Man) #5 (2007)
- Ka-Zar: Flashback #1 (1997)
- Miracleman #1 (variant cover art, March 2014)
- Secret War from the Files of Nick Fury (2005)
- Star Wars #1–6 (2015)
  - Star Wars Volume I: Skywalker Strikes (2015) ISBN 978-0785192138
- Uncanny Avengers #1–4 (2012–2013)
  - Uncanny Avengers Omnibus (2015) ISBN 978-0785193944
- Uncanny X-Men #352 (1998)
- Union Jack, miniseries, #1–3 (1998–99)
  - Union Jack, tpb, 96 pages, Marvel, 2002, ISBN 0-7851-0934-X
- X-Men/Alpha Flight, miniseries, #1–2 (1998)
