= Troy Boyle =

American comic book artist and writer

Troy Boyle (b. July 28, 1966) is an American comic book artist and writer and former president of The National Atheist Party (now the Secular Party Of America), which Boyle and a friend founded in March 2011. It claims 7,500 members and chapters in all 50 states.

Boyle has worked for Image Comics, Desperado Publishing, Caliber Press, and Boneyard Press. Some of Boyle comic book art is included in Mysterious Visions Anthology, Ppfszt!, Tribute, and The Return of Happy the Clown. He also provided artwork for David Gerrold's comic A Doctor For the Enterprise.
