= Aftermath (1994 film) =

1994 Spanish short film by Nacho Cerdà

- DVD released by Unearthed Films
- Directed by: Nacho Cerdà
- Written by: Nacho Cerdà
- Produced by: Nacho Cerdà
- Starring: Pep Tosar; Jordi Tarrida; Ángel Tarris; Xevi Collellmir
- Cinematography: Christopher Baffa
- Edited by: Raul Almanzan
- Music by: Mark Cowling
- Production company: Waken Productions
- Release date: October 8, 1994 (Sitges Film Festival)
- Running time: 32 minutes
- Country: Spain
- Budget: $35,000

Aftermath is a 1994 Spanish horror short film written and directed by Nacho Cerdà. It stars Pep Tosar, Jordi Tarrida, Ángel Tarris, and Xevi Collellmir. The film contains no spoken dialogue and follows an unnamed morgue worker, played by Tosar, as he mutilates and has sex with the dead body of a woman named Marta. It is the middle installment in a thematic trilogy of short films by Cerdà, being preceded by The Awakening in 1991 and followed by Genesis in 1998.

== Plot ==
A woman named Marta Arnau Marti dies in a car crash after accidentally running over a dog. An orderly wheels Marta's body into a morgue drawer, past a mourning couple, to whom a nurse gives a crucifix necklace. The orderly overhears two workers performing autopsies on a pair of male bodies, looks in on them out of curiosity, and leaves when one of the morticians (who is disturbingly enthused by his duties) glares at him. The morticians complete their work on the dead men, and while one leaves, the other remains and brings in Marta's body.

Aroused by Marta, the mortician locks himself in the morgue with her body, undresses it, removes the brain, and caresses it with a knife, which he uses to mutilate Marta's vagina and cut open her torso. The mortician masturbates to orgasm while fondling Marta's breasts and innards, then takes photographs of his handiwork. Unable to contain his lust any longer, the mortician engages in necrophilia after setting his camera on automatic to record the event.

Afterward, the mortician autopsies Marta, cleans up, and leaves. In his home, the pajama-clad mortician blends Marta's stolen heart into a pulp, which he gives to his dog before relaxing in his sitting room. As a baby's cries emanate from the television, the scraps of newspaper the dog is eating the heart off of are shown to contain Marta's obituary.

== Cast ==
- Pep Tosar as Forense
- Jordi Tarrida as Médico #2
- Ángel Tarris as Celador
- Xevi Collellmir as Cadáver Vin

== Release ==
Aftermath was released on DVD by Unearthed Films on August 23, 2005, in a set that included 1991's The Awakening and 1998's Genesis, two other short films by Nacho Cerdà. Many retailers reportedly refused to stock the DVDs. All three shorts were rereleased together on DVD by Anthem Pictures on February 27, 2007.

The film was made available on the streaming service Netflix in September 2010.

== Reception ==
Bloody Disgusting praised Aftermath, gave it a score of 4½/5, and wrote, "Nacho Cerdà's short film, Aftermath, is definitely one of the most controversial films of the last couple of decades. Its ruthless and realistic depiction of grisly autopsies and a sinister surgeon with an inclination towards violent necrophilia has some of the hardest scenes to stomach in any horror movie, period." In a review written for Dread Central, D.W. Bostaph, Jr. commended the film, writing, "It is intense. It is unflinching. Yet, at its core it is subtle, hauntingly beautiful, and every bit as rich in detail and composition as any other great film has ever been." The film was awarded a score of 4½/5 by Bill Gibron of DVD Talk, who wrote, "Treating the departed as nothing more than a plaything for the fulfillment of one's most twisted desires almost erases any grander theme. While the ending is quite unnerving, the rest of Aftermath is an equally uneasy ordeal. You may see nothing more in it than fetishism gone foul, however. Or you may see something very insightful." In a retrospective written for Rue Morgue, Jovanka Vuckovic called the film "a staggering meditation on the indignities of death and the depravity of bodily corruption" and went on to write, "It's a film that is unique to the genre because it confronts a subject that is customary to horror, but does so with sobering realism and artistic vigor-a visceral masterpiece that few have seen or will even want to see."

Adrian Halen of Horror News was dismissive of the film, finding the use of classical music during the violent scenes pretentious and concluding, "I'm sure some intellects will look past the gore to dig out some thoughtful façade. But hey... when we get down to it, it's about autopsies, it's about necrophilia and it's about shock."

The film ranked #3 on JoBlo.com's The Ten Spot: Most Disturbing Movies Ever, #1 on ComingSoon.net's 10 Essentials: Sexual Perversion and Kink in Genre Films, and #7 on Dread Central's 10 Most Disturbing Scary Movies Ever Made.
