= Cry for Dawn =

Horror anthology comics book

- Cry for Dawn #1

Publication information
- Publisher: Cry for Dawn Productions
- Format: Ongoing series
- Genre: Horror
- Publication date: 1989 – 1992
- No. of issues: 9

Creative team
- Written by: Joseph M. Monks
- Artist(s): Joseph Michael Linsner

Cry for Dawn was an American horror-anthology comic book that ran nine issues from 1989 to 1992. The book was primarily written by Joseph Michael Linsner and Joseph M. Monks with artwork by Linsner. The series featured guest artist and writers in some issues, but the work was largely performed by Linsner and Monks. It was published by Cry for Dawn Productions from 1989 to 1992 and introduced the character of Dawn, the goddess of birth and rebirth. Although Dawn served as an emcee in the Cry for Dawn issues, she would later have many titles dedicated to her journeys through heaven and hell across multiple spin-off titles for Sirius Entertainment, Image Comics, and Linsner.com.
