= Hart D. Fisher =

American writer

- Born: Hart D. Fisher; May 27, 1969 (age 57) Champaign, Illinois, U.S.
- Areas: Writer, Publisher
- Notable works: Jeffrey Dahmer: An Unauthorized Biography of a Serial Killer; Boneyard Press

Hart D. Fisher (born May 27, 1969) is an American horror crime author, comic book writer and publisher best known for creating a comic book about Jeffrey Dahmer and for founding Boneyard Press.

== Early life and education ==
Fisher graduated in 1992 with a fine and applied arts bachelor's degree from the University of Illinois at Urbana–Champaign.

== Career ==
=== Jeffrey Dahmer comics and Boneyard Press ===
In 1992, while still in college, Fisher founded the publisher, Boneyard Press, in Champaign, Illinois. Fisher credits another artist, Mark Beachum, as his inspiration to create his own company.

Boneyard's first release was Hart's comic book, Jeffrey Dahmer: An Unauthorized Biography of a Serial Killer. The comic was released in spring 1992, just a few months after Dahmer was sentenced to life in prison for his horrific crimes. Upon its release, protests were held in Milwaukee, where Dahmer had lived, as well as in Fisher's home town of Champaign.

Cashing in on his notoriety, Fisher published additional Dahmer-themed comics shortly thereafter, including Jeffrey Dahmer vs. Jesus Christ #1 (February 1993) and Dahmer's Zombie Squad (1993). Fisher appeared on a 1993 episode of the Sally Jessy Raphael show and on a CNN show in 1994 to discuss criticism of the creation of the Dahmer comics.

Besides Fisher's own work, Boneyard published "mature readers" material in the genres of unauthorized biographies, true crime, horror, and erotic comics. The company's longest-running title was the 12-issue horror anthology Flowers on the Razorwire (1993–1997). Creators published by Boneyard included John Cassaday, Troy Boyle, Gerard Way, J. G. Jones and Angel Gabriele. Threshold Press was a Boneyard Press imprint.

In 1998, Boneyard Press published Stephen Elliott's first novel, Jones Inn. Boneyard had previously published some of Elliott's poetry in the Flowers on the Razorwire comics anthology. Boneyard operated from 1991 to 2003.

=== Other work ===
Fisher was a co-editor of Glenn Danzig's independent comic publisher Verotik from 1994 to 1995. In 1995, he and Christian Moore co-authored the comic A Taste of Cherry with which was released by Verotik.

From 1995 to 1998, Fisher was a designer and copywriter for Sampson West Advertising.

In 2003–2004, Fisher worked with a fellow horror writer/publisher, Joseph M. Monks, on a number of projects, including the books Road Kills (Chanting Monks Press, 2003) and Sex Crimes (co-published by Boneyard Press & Chanting Monks, 2003). Fisher directed the straight-to-video horror film, Flowers on the Razorwire: Chance Meeting (Crime Pays, 2004), which was written by Monks.

In 2008, Fisher founded the film company American Horrors, a horror channel on FilmOn, and released on DVD the film The Garbage Man, which he wrote and produced, about an African-American serial killer.

== Media appearances ==
In the early 1990s, Hero Illustrated magazine included Fisher on its "100 Most Important People in the Comic Book Industry", calling him the "most dangerous man in comics".

The Larry King Live show in 2008 included a segment with Fisher about Jeffrey Dahmer memorabilia, including Fisher's comics. The episode also has a young Gerard Way of My Chemical Romance, an employee of Fisher's in the early 1990s. Fisher also discussed the Dahmer comic book on a panel at the 2011 South by Southwest festival in Austin, Texas.

== Legal issues, tragedies, and controversies ==
In 1992, Boneyard sued Marvel Comics over Marvel's Hell's Angel/Dark Angel, as Boneyard was already publishing a comic with the title Dark Angel.

At one point, Fisher faked his own death as an April Fools' Day Prank. In 1993, Fisher's girlfriend, Michelle Ray Davis, was raped and murdered during an armed robbery at the motel where she worked. Fisher testified for the prosecution at the trial, and the perpetrator was convicted of the murder and given a death sentence. In 2001, however, Illinois Governor George Ryan commuted the death sentence to life in prison.

In August 1994, a suit was filed by Dahmer's family against Boneyard Press and Fisher for the unauthorized release of the first Dahmer comic. The suit was soon dismissed by a Milwaukee judge.

In 1995, Boneyard in turn was sued by the sportsman and felon O. J. Simpson for the unauthorized biographical comics, Doin' Time with O.J. and O.J.'s Big Bust-Out.

In 2008, Fisher accused his former protege Gerard Way of promoting the false claim that The Umbrella Academy (Dark Horse Comics) was Way's first foray into comic book writing. 13 years earlier, when Way was 15 years old, Boneyard Press had published Way's first comic book, On Raven's Wings.

== Personal life ==
As of 2018, Fisher lived in Williams Bay, Wisconsin. Fisher's wife, Wakako Kawagoshi-Fisher, died in 2018.
