= Joseph M. Monks =

American writer, publisher, and film director

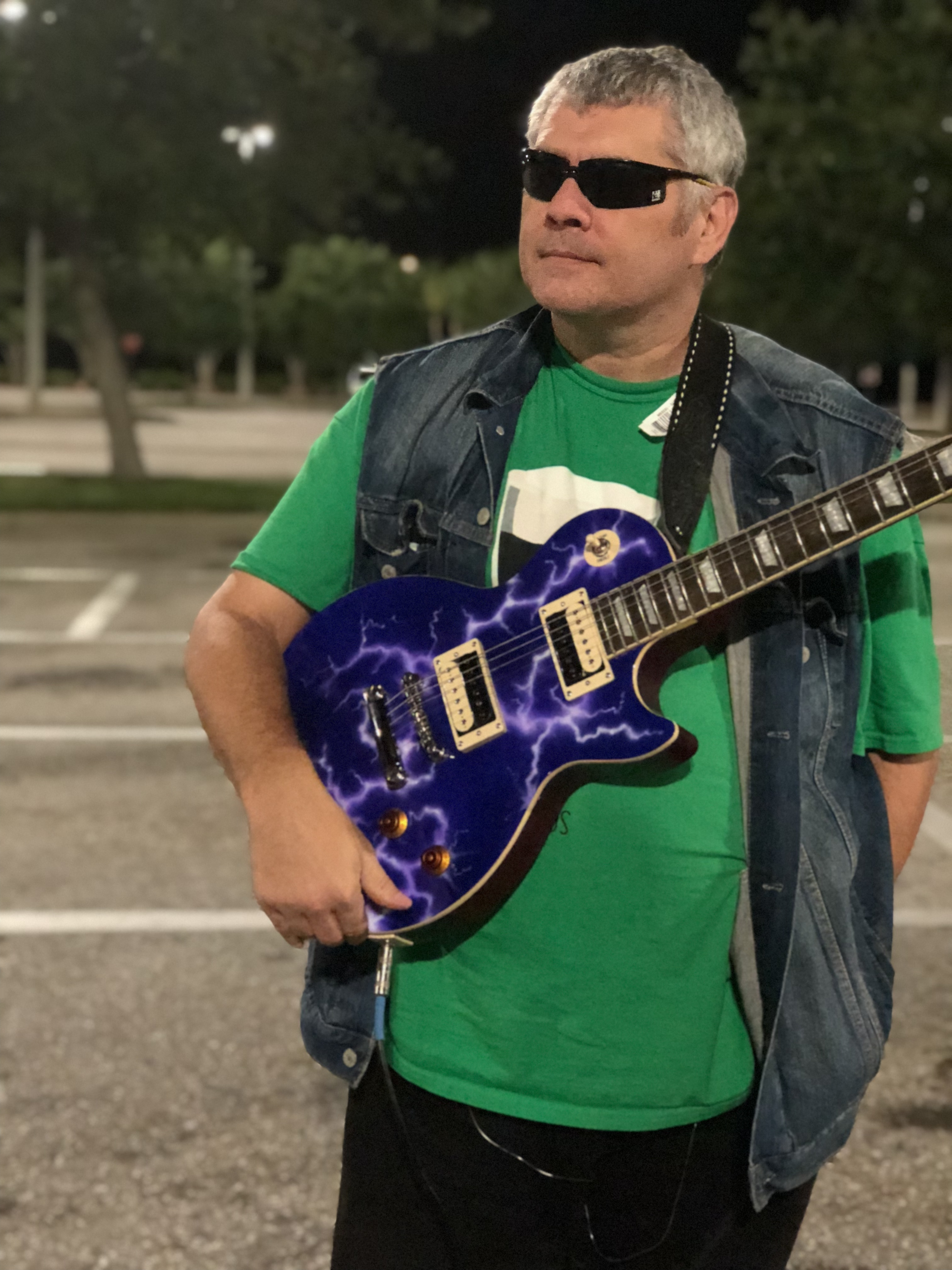
- Born: Joseph Patrick Monks, Jr. February 21, 1968 Queens, New York
- Died: August 19, 2023 (aged 55) Cape Coral, Florida
- Areas: Writer, Publisher
- Notable works: Cry For Dawn; The Bunker
- Awards: Gasparilla International Film Festival Achievement in Cinema award, 2011
- Spouse: Pamela Hazelton (m. 2004)

Joseph M. Monks (February 21, 1968–August 19, 2023) was an American writer and the world's first visually impaired feature film director, best known for co-creating the cult phenomena horror comic book Cry For Dawn.

== Biography ==
Monks, with fellow Queens-native Joseph Michael Linsner, co-created Cry For Dawn (1989–1992), an American horror comic book anthology. Linsner and Monks created Cry For Dawn Productions to publish the book; the publisher, based in Valley Stream, New York, also released other comics in the period 1989 to 1993.

Cry For Dawn Productions dissolved in late 1993, and shortly thereafter Monks founded his own publishing company, known variously as CFD Productions, C.F.D. Productions, or CreativeForce Designs & Productions. With his new publisher, Monks became a driving force in independent horror comics, launching NightCry, Tales of the Dead, and several one-shots. Notable creators published by CFD included Dan Brereton (in That Chemical Reflex, 1994), Brian Michael Bendis (in Noir Quarterly, 1995), and John Cassaday (in No Profit for the Wise, 1996). Monks' own comics writing appeared in NightCry, In Rage and Tales of the Dead.

Monks closed down CFD Productions in 1997 and started up Chanting Monks Studios in 1998, launching titles such as The Night Terrors, also featuring Bernie Wrightson and William Stout; Gory Lori, a modern-day zombie apocalypse series illustrated by Jeff Salisbury and Mike Koneful; and the horror anthology Zacherley's Midnight Terrors, a tribute to TV horror host John Zacherle, with art by the likes of Basil Gogos, Ken Kelly, and William Stout.

In 2002, at age 33, Monks lost his sight as a result of diabetic retinopathy. In December of that year, he completed his first anthology of original fiction, Stuff Out'a My Head, released by Chanting Monks Press. The anthology featured illustrations by Bernie Wrightson and others.

In 2003, one of Monk's short stories, "Chance Meeting," was optioned for adaptation to the screen by Japanese publishing house Bunkasha in tandem with DK Publishing. Titled Flowers on the Razorwire: Chance Meeting, directed by Hart D. Fisher, the work was intended to be used as a Japanese television pilot but was instead released as a stand-alone DVD under CPI Home Video and Chanting Monks Press. Monks also appeared as an actor in the film, with his character being tortured by a dominatrix demanding he tell her a scary story.

In 2003–2004, Monks collaborated with Hart D. Fisher (and Fisher's publishing house Boneyard Press) on a number of projects.

Monk's story, "Shuteye", appeared in The Mammoth Book of Best Horror Comics (Running Press, 2008, ISBN 978-0786720729), and the New Horror Handbook (BearManor Media, May 2009, ISBN 978-1593931445) sports a chapter about his film work.

In 2010, Monks launched a Kickstarter crowdfunding project to complete The Bunker, his first feature film (the Kickstarter ran from August 1 to September 30, 2010). Kevin Smith and Ralph Garman talked about the project on their podcast Hollywood Babble-On and contributed the final funds needed to reach the goal. With The Bunker, Monk became the first blind feature film director. In 2013 The Bunker was released on DVD in the US via Commodity Films, and in Germany via Tom Cat Films.

In 2011, Monks received the Achievement in Cinema award at the Gasparilla International Film Festival. Tampa, Florida.

Monks "passed away unexpectedly at home" in Cape Coral, Florida, on Saturday, August 19, 2023. Just prior to his death, Monks completed Splatterville, an anthology that was to serve as a foundation for the fictional city Far Hollow.

== Bibliography ==
=== Books ===
- Stuff Out'a My Head (Chanting Monks Press, 2002) ISBN 978-0972660402
- Road Kills (Chanting Monks Press, 2003) — with Hart D. Fisher and Christa Faust
- Sex Crimes (co-published by Boneyard Press & Chanting Monks, 2003) ISBN 978-0972660426 — co-edited by Monks and Hart D. Fisher
- Dead Meat (self-published anthology, 2012)
- Torn to Pieces (MSI, 2012)
- Scare Package (2012) ISBN 978-1480088139
- Walkers, 2012
- Dead Meat, 2012
- Scare Package, 2012 ISBN 978-1480088139
- Skin Flick, 2013
- Grave Choices, 2014
- Joseph M. Monks Omnibus 1 (Torn to Pieces / Dead Meat /Grave Choices), 2014
- Simple Things, 2016
- The Hidden, 2018
- The Thirteen, 2020
- SecondHand Creeps, 2021 (editor) ISBN 979-8506082057
- The Lost City, 2022
- The Lost Girl, 2022
- A Christmas Story, 2022
- Exactly The Wrong Things, 2022
- Road-EO, 2023
- The Nat’l Tattle, 2023
- Splatterville, 2023

=== Film ===
- Flowers on the Razorwire: Chance Meeting (Crime Pays, 2004) — written by Monks, directed by Hart D. Fisher
- The Bunker (Sight Unseen Pictures, LLC, 2011) — written & directed by Monks
- Redemption — written & directed by Monks

=== Comics (writer) ===
- Cry for Dawn Volumes I through IX (Cry For Dawn Productions, 1989–1992)
- Subtle Violents (Cry for Dawn Productions, 1991)
- Villain & Hero (Cry for Dawn Productions, 1993)
- In Rage (CFD Productions, 1994)
- Nightcry (CFD Productions, 1994–1996)
- Tales of the Dead (CFD Productions, 1994)
- Hyper Violents (CFD Productions, 1996)
- Insidious Tales (CFD Productions, 1996)
- Agony In Black (Chanting Monks Studios, 1997)
- The Night Terrors (Chanting Monks Studios, 2000)
- Gory Lori (Chanting Monks Studios, 2004)
- Zacherley's Midnite Terrors (Chanting Monks Studios, 2004)
- No Playtime For Amy (MSI, 2013)

=== Comics (publisher) ===
- Girl - The Rule of Darkness (CFD Productions, 1992)
- Heart of Darkness (CFD Productions, 1994)
- The New Order (CFD Productions, 1994)
- In Rage (CFD Productions, 1994)
- That Chemical Reflex (CFD Productions, 1994)
- Outlaw Nation (CFD Productions, 1994)
- Scimidar (CFD Productions, 1995)
- Noir (CFD Productions, 1995)
- The Vampire Verses (CFD Productions, 1995)
- Hardcore (CFD Productions, 1995)
- So Dark the Rose (CFD Productions, 1995)
- Warlash (CFD Productions, 1995)
- Journey into Madness (CFD Productions, 1996)
- Bound in Darkness (CFD Productions, 1996)
- Dragon Pearl & Jade (CFD Productions, 1996)
- No Profit for the Wise (CFD Productions, 1996)
- Realm Wars: Beneath the Stain of Time (CFD Productions, 1996)
- Reverend Ablack (CFD Productions, 1996)
- Shock & Spank the Monkeyboys Special (CFD Productions, 1996)
- Vampires Lust (CFD Productions, 1996)
- VonPyre (CFD Productions, 1996)
- Blood for the Muse (CFD Productions, 1997)
- Cybergen (CFD Productions, 1997)
- Forever Warriors (CFD Productions, 1997)
- The Intruder (CFD Productions, 1997)
- The Invincibles (CFD Productions, 1997)
- Neal Sainte Crosse's Nightshades: Children of the Masque (CFD Productions, 1997)
- Doc Behemoth (Chanting Monks Studio, 1998)
- Creatures Featured: Fantastic Creations of Bernie Wrightson (Chanting Monks Studios, 2000)
- Bernie Wrightson Fan Club Membership Kit (Chanting Monks Studios, 2004)
- Ripperman GN (Chanting Monks Studio, 2004)
- Wulf & Batsy (Chanting Monks Studio, 2005)
