= Anastasia Hille =

British actress (born 1965)

- Born: 1965 (age 60–61); Lambeth, London, England
- Occupation: Actress
- Years active: 1992–present

Anastasia Hille (born 1965) is an English film, television and theatre actress and ceramicist.

== Early life ==
Born in Lambeth, London, her mother was Finnish. Hille was a student at London's Drama Centre and won second prize at the Ian Charleson Awards in 1994 for her performance as Isabella in Measure for Measure.

== Career ==
=== Stage ===
She has twice been nominated for the Olivier Award for Best Supporting Actress, for The Master Builder at the Almeida Theatre in 2011, and for The Effect at the National's Cottesloe Theatre in 2013.

=== Television ===
Hille was nominated for the 2013 BAFTA TV Award for Best Supporting Actress for the 2012 miniseries The Fear.

Her other TV roles include Kavanagh QC: The Sweetest Thing (1995), Trial & Retribution (1997), as Carole Lombard in RKO 281 (2000), The Cazalets (2001), Agatha Christie's Poirot: Three Act Tragedy (2010), and The Missing (2016).

=== Film ===
Her film roles include The Hole (2001), The Abandoned (2006), Snow White & the Huntsman (2012), and A United Kingdom (2016).

== Personal life ==
She is also a ceramicist known for her minimalist orb-shaped pieces. While travelling as an actress she studied ceramics in museums around the world.

== Acting credits ==
=== Film ===
| Year | Title | Role | Notes |
|---|---|---|---|
| 1998 | The Wisdom of Crocodiles | Karen | AKA, Immortality |
| 1999 | The Escort | Steffy | |
| 2000 | New Year's Day | Shelley | |
| 2000 | Five Seconds to Spare | Karla | |
| 2001 | The Hole | Gillian | |
| 2006 | The Abandoned | Marie Jones | |
| 2008 | Good | Helen Halder | |
| 2011 | The Awakening | Dorothy Vandermeer | |
| 2012 | Bert and Dickie | Lena Bushnell | |
| 2012 | Snow White and the Huntsman | Ravenna's mother | |
| 2015 | Swansong | Dr. Bates | |
| 2015 | Hamlet | Gertrude | |
| 2016 | Trespass Against Us | Mrs. Crawley | |
| 2016 | A United Kingdom | Dot Williams | |
| 2017 | Tulip Fever | Mrs. Mitjins | |
| 2018 | Mamma Mia! Here We Go Again | Dr. Inge Horvath | |
| 2021 | Martyrs Lane | Lillian | |

=== Television ===
| Year | Title | Role | Notes |
|---|---|---|---|
| 1992 | Red Dwarf | New Kochanski | Episode: "Back to Reality" |
| 1993 | The Bill | Lena Foster | Episode: "Hypocritical Oath" |
| 1993 | Jeeves and Wooster | Rosie M Banks | Episode: "Honoria Glossop Turns Up" |
| 1995 | Kavanagh QC | Annie Lewis | Episode: "The Sweetest Thing" |
| 1995 | Eleven Men Against Eleven | Sylvia Tench | TV film |
| 1997 | Drovers' Gold | Isobel Markby | TV miniseries |
| 1997 | Trial & Retribution | Belinda Sinclair | Episodes: "Tod eines Madchens", "1.2" |
| 1997 | A Dance to the Music of Time | Matilda | Episodes: "The Thirties", "The War" |
| 1998 | Big Women | Stephie | TV miniseries |
| 1999 | Twice in a Lifetime | Latisha | Recurring role |
| 1999 | RKO 281 | Carole Lombard | TV film |
| 2000 | Storm Damage | Rosa | TV film |
| 2001 | The Cazalets | Sybil Cazalet | Main role |
| 2002 | Outside the Rules | Rachel Selby | TV film |
| 2002, 2004 | Cutting It | Chantal Morisot | Episodes: "1.2", "1.5", "3.2" |
| 2004 | Hawking | Susan McClean | TV film |
| 2004 | Silent Witness | Kate Slattery | Episodes: "Nowhere Fast: Parts 1 & 2" |
| 2006 | Tripping Over | Clare | Recurring role |
| 2008 | Spooks | Marina Connolly | Episode: "7.8" |
| 2009 | Lewis | Ginny Harris | |
| 2010 | Agatha Christie's Poirot | Cynthia Dacres | Episode: "Three Act Tragedy" |
| 2010 | Foyle's War | Jane Devereaux | Episode: "The Hide" |
| 2011 | London's Burning | Jan | TV film |
| 2012 | The Bletchley Circle | Angela | Episodes: "Cracking a Killer's Code: Parts 2 & 3" |
| 2012 | Getting On | Dr. Tatty Oxford | Episodes: "3.4", "3.6" |
| 2012 | The Fear | Jo Beckett | All 4 episodes: "1.1", "1.2", "1.3", "1.4" |
| 2013 | The Tunnel | Andrea Kerrigan | Recurring role (series 1) |
| 2014 | Prey | Andrea Mackenzie | Main role (series 1) |
| 2014–2016 | The Missing | Celia Baptiste | Main role |
| 2015 | Not Safe for Work | Jeffries | TV miniseries |
| 2015 | You, Me and the Apocalypse | Mary | Episodes: "What Happens to Idiots", "Home Sweet Home" |
| 2016 | Class | Orla'ath | Episode: "Nightvisiting" |
| 2016 | Him | Magda Elliot | Episodes: "1.1", "1.3" |
| 2016 | Humans | Diane | Episodes: "2.2", "2.4" |
| 2018 | Requiem | Laura | Episodes: "Blaidd Carreg", "Bessie" |
| 2018 | Wanderlust | Rita Bellows | Main role |
| 2018 | The Last Kingdom | Abbess | Episode: "3.4" |
| 2018 | West of Liberty | Martha | Episodes: "1.2", "1.3", "1.4", "1.6" |
| 2019-2021 | Baptiste | Celia Baptiste | Main role |
| 2019 | Keeping Faith | Gael Reardon | Main role |
| 2020 | Silent Witness | Ann Carson | Episodes 23.7, 23.8 |
| 2021 | The Pembrokeshire Murders | Dr Angela Gallop | 3 Part Mini-Series ITV1 |
| 2022 | The Ipcress File | Alice | Supporting role |
| 2022 | A Spy Among Friends | Flora Solomon | TV miniseries |
| 2023 | The Couple Next Door | Susan | TV miniseries |
| 2024 | A Gentleman in Moscow | Olga | TV limited series |
| 2026 | Steal | Haley Dunne | 3 episodes |

=== Theatre ===
| Year | Title | Role | Theatre | Notes |
|---|---|---|---|---|
| 1994 | Measure for Measure | Isabella | Cheek by Jowl | |
| 1995 | The Duchess of Malfi | The Duchess | Cheek by Jowl | |
| 2009 | Dido, Queen of Carthage | Dido | London | |
| 2010 | Macbeth | Lady Macbeth | Barbican Centre, London | |
| 2010 | The Master Builder | | Almeida Theatre | |
| 2012 | The Effect | | Royal National Theatre, London | |
| 2015 | Hamlet | Gertrude | Barbican Centre, London | |
| 2022 | Oresteia | Klytemnestra | Park Avenue Armory | |

== Awards and nominations ==
| Year | Award | Category | Nominated work | Result | Ref. |
| 1994 | Ian Charleson Awards | | Measure for Measure | Second | |
| 2011 | Olivier Award | Best Supporting Actress | The Master Builder | Nominated | |
| 2013 | Olivier Award | Best Supporting Actress | The Effect | Nominated | |
| 2013 | BAFTA TV Award | Best Supporting Actress | The Fear | Nominated | |

== See also ==
- List of British actors
- List of Jeeves and Wooster characters
