= Kabuki (David W. Mack comic) =

Comic book series

- Cover of Kabuki: Skin Deep

Publication information
- Publisher: Caliber Comics (1994); Marvel Comics (2004–2009)
- Genre: Superhero
- Publication date: 1994–2009
- Main character: Kabuki/Ukiko

Creative team
- Created by: David Mack
- Written by: David Mack
- Artist: David Mack
- Penciller: David Mack
- Inker: David Mack
- Letterer: David Mack
- Colorist: David Mack

Kabuki is a comic book series created by artist and writer David Mack, first published in 1994 by Caliber Comics in KABUKI: Fear the Reaper, a 48-page comic book (with an eight page promotional peek at the story in High Caliber earlier that year). It is a story of an assassin who struggles with her identity in near-future Japan. The 2004–2009 miniseries, Kabuki: The Alchemy, was published by Marvel Comics under its imprint Icon Comics. The series has been collected into several trade paperbacks, which include several one-shots and spin-off limited series.

== Plot ==
Set in an alternate near-future Japan, a young woman codenamed "Kabuki", acts as an agent and television law-enforcement personality for a clandestine government body known as "The Noh". In the first volume of the series, The Noh's nature and background is explained.

The Noh is controlled by a renowned World War II Japanese military man known as the General, who has achieved much power and status for being a brilliant military tactician during his many years of service. The agency itself exists as part of Japan's strict police state, which hunts down and brutally executes criminals for their misdeeds under the veil of keeping the peace. Secretly the Noh also acts to maintain the balance of crime and order that ultimately benefits the national economy on both sides of the law and thus targets politicians, businessmen and certain underworld kingpins whose actions threaten this balance. Kabuki herself is one of eight masked assassins who perform these secret executions under the General's orders.

Ryuchi Kai is the General's son and another war veteran, who is a Yakuza boss and every bit as deadly and brilliant as his father but has earned a reputation for swift brutality. Astonishingly, despite the high level of discretion surrounding Noh, Kai manages to infiltrate the agency, personally, by using its policy of masked operatives to his advantage. He poses as Oni – one of the General's two overseers of the assassins (the other being a mysterious old man named "Dove"). He manipulates Kabuki and her partners into eliminating the entire underworld hierarchy in Tokyo. Publicly Kai is a talented businessman with much stock and influence in the Japanese market, thus this move makes him indispensable and essential to the balance.

Kabuki's origins are revealed as the story progresses, her mother was an Ainu comfort woman named "Tsukiko" taken by Japanese soldiers during WWII. Rather than be used as sex slaves, the General instead had the women act out Kabuki plays to entertain the soldiers, something that was met with scorn by his son, who fast made "Kabuki" a derogatory term among the ranks. Tsukiko in particular captivated the General, a widower, who took her to be his wife. This decision infuriated Kai, who saw it as an affront to his deceased mother. On the eve of their wedding, he assaulted, raped, blinded and savagely scarred Tsukiko with the words "Kabuki" into her back. Tsukiko survived the encounter, and she was pregnant with Kai's child, something the General kept hidden. Tsukiko dies while her daughter Ukiko is being born. The General in turn raises her as his own daughter. Nine years later, Kai, still demented and vicious, learns of the child's existence and savagely attacks Ukiko at her mother's grave, once again carving "Kabuki" into her skin, this time along the girl's face. Ukiko dies for nine minutes but is successfully resuscitated. From then on, the General grooms her into a perfect soldier, having her trained in martial arts, combat and weaponry so that she may never fall victim to another assault. When the Noh is created, she is given a mask reminiscent of her mother's face and the codename "Kabuki" – claiming the term as her own.

In the present, Kai is a political figurehead and inaccessible from The Noh's wrath, going as far to reconnect with his father to cement his status. Most Noh agents are all dismissed by Dove except Kabuki. Dove reveals that he is in fact her biological grandfather on her mother's side, that The Noh has become defunct, and that Kai's reign has gone on long enough. He dispatches Kabuki/Ukiko to eliminate him, his followers, and The Noh's board of directors. The battle is bloody, and Kai very nearly defeats her, though she succeeds at the last moment. Her final confrontation at the General's headquarters results in her sustaining fatal wounds. Victorious and dying, Ukiko finally limps to her mother's grave to die.

With the following volumes, it is revealed that Ukiko was in fact abducted shortly after this, by a rival agency called "Control Corps", who treat her injuries and keep her trapped and medicated within a hidden asylum for broken-down government agents. For nine months, they study her and probe her for information regarding The Noh. She does not relent and instead, devotes this period to introspection and personal reflection. During this time she is contacted periodically by another inmate – a mysterious individual known as Akemi who has grand plans for escape. Meanwhile, outside of the asylum, all of Japan is in confusion as its top political lynchpins have been killed, and The Noh is unable to comment. Dove has vanished and, with him, all knowledge of Ukiko's motives. Thus, the seven remaining assassins have been dispatched to hunt down Ukiko and kill her. Ironically during the months of searching, two of the agents, codenamed "Scarab" and "Tigerlilly", become friends and start socializing as civilians – something which later compromises their mission.

Through Akemi's elaborate machinations, Ukiko manages to escape Control Corps just as her former partners arrive to eliminate her, resulting in the death of one of them. Akemi takes advantage of this and just as Kai did, he poses as the fallen agent to continue infiltrating The Noh, this time on Ukiko's behalf.

Ukiko then embarks on a convoluted trail, given to her by Akemi, so she can forge a new identity and life for herself. Escaping Japan to America, with the help of other brilliant escapees under Akemi's employ, she successfully achieves a blissful, private existence wherein she can be happy. The final pages of the series see her subtly overthrowing The Noh altogether, through a tell-all comic book created by herself and a comic artist whom she encounters. She also falls pregnant, much to her delight.

== Style ==
Unlike most comic series, the plot of Kabuki moves very little over the course of the volumes. Very little fast-paced or violent action takes place. Instead, most of the focus is on memories, dreams, thoughts and philosophy. David Mack's characters, especially Kabuki herself, revisit the same scenes and memories many times, rethinking them and their significance. Mack uses myriad art styles, not only pencil, ink, and color, but paint, magazine clippings, manga scans, and crayons. In Kabuki: The Alchemy especially, many of the pages are photos (or color scans) of collages using a variety of materials; for example, the fingers of Japanese sandalwood fans become the borders of the comic panels. Imagery is important and prominent in the series; Mack reuses the same images, often changing them slightly, and focusing on the emotional content of images and the power of memories.

In Kabuki: Masks of the Noh, a different artist was assigned to each agent as a way of visually representing their personalities. This continued in Kabuki: Scarab, which was written by Mack with art by Rick Mays, who had previously drawn Scarab in Masks of the Noh.

== Characters ==
=== The Noh Assassins ===
- Kabuki/Ukiko is the protagonist of the series. Ukiko is a beautiful but tragic young woman struggling with her sense of self, following years of social withdrawal, mental conditioning and a severe assault during childhood that horribly disfigured her face. Ukiko acts as the top enforcement agent of The Noh, executing potentially dangerous individuals before they become national-level threats. She is also the voice of the airwaves and a national icon, updating the people of Japan with daily news and weather reports. When her biological father, Ryuchi Kai, begins to compromise the Noh, Ukiko sets out to eliminate him. She starts a difficult sequence of events that ultimately allows her to assess and actualize her own identity. Ukiko's Kabuki-Noh costume is a variation of the Japanese flag, her weapons are Ainu farming sickles, and her mask is based on her mother's face.
- Scarab/Keiko: Considered the secondary character of the series, the codename "Scarab" was given to her because it is her duty to clean up the scenes left by the other Noh assassins, very much like the scarab beetle. Initially a street orphan alongside close friend Seiko, she encountered a young motorcycle hooligan named Yukio and quickly fell for him. Yukio's involvement with the Yakuza results in him and her friend Seiko being killed. Keiko was granted amnesty for her part by a government agent named Kenji in exchange for the infiltration of various underworld social groups. Alongside this she was also given combat and weaponry training, ultimately leading to her placement as a Noh assassin. Following Kabuki's betrayal, she and fellow agent Tigerlilly inadvertently form a deep friendship whilst in pursuit. Her Noh costume is a spiked, dominatrix-like bodysuit based on one of Yukio's drawings, and her mask bears a swirling insect-like pattern.
- Tigerlilly is a fellow Noh assassin who befriends Scarab after being rescued by her, following a confrontation with Control Corps during their abduction of Kabuki. Little is known about her early life, although she treasures her sister-like bond with Scarab, and often confides in her despite The Noh's strict no-fraternization policy. Before her life as a Noh operative, she was a comic book artist which was a profession she maintained as a cover-role while working as an assassin. When the agents invade the Control Corps installation, Tiger Lily vanishes, presumably to target Kabuki; it is assumed that she survived the incident based on Akemi's letters in Kabuki Volume 6: The Alchemy. Also in this volume, Ukiko briefly encounters a woman comic artist on her airplane to America, with a very high suggestion that this may have been Tigerlilly's civilian persona. Her Noh costume was initially a very revealing set of lingerie, with her hair tied back in a French plait. On Scarab's advice, she switches to a more practical T-shirt and combat trousers. Her mask bears the stripes of her name, and she wields a short sword.
- Siamese are a pair of twin assassins who always work together as one Noh agent unit, and they are often sent on missions that require their unique synchronicity. Born conjoined at the arm, they each have a prosthetic replacement, other than this very little is known of their background. One sister (the left twin) is quite talkative and taunts her targets, whereas the other is more taciturn and chooses to talk only when situations require. Kabuki Volume 4: Skin Deep sees Siamese standing over Ukiko's corpse, presumably having killed her. With the entirety of the next two volumes acting as a flashback, Siamese take on a darkly, sinister tone, appearing briefly, but always after an act of brutal violence – the build-up to their confrontation is slow and full of dread. Ironically the quiet right twin of the two is revealed to be a fan of Kabuki's on-screen persona and despairs over their mission. Siamese's Noh costumes are sleeveless T-shirts bearing the Japanese sun and rotations of stockings and trousers. The prosthetic arms act as weapons by being fitted with various attachments, and their masks are halved and monochromatic.
- Ice: Nothing is revealed about this particular agent's identity or backstory. Ice's personality makes her prominent. She is the most dedicated of the Noh assassins, never questioning orders and correcting those who do so. In the wake of Kai's death, Ice takes the initiative and becomes the de facto field leader, directing the other agents to locate and eliminate Kabuki. Of all the agents, Ice's costume is the most inconsistent. Initially she has thin, wiry hair, a transparent bra, and armoured combat trousers, but on occasion, she sports razor-tipped cornrows and no chest cover at all. Ice's weapon set makes her one of the most formidable of the agents. Her arms are surgically adapted to contain sub-zero ice picks which she fires as weapons, and hence her name. Alongside this, her fingers are also diamond-tipped claws containing poison-tipped shurikens. Her Noh mask is relatively simple, with a curled spiral between the eyes.
- Snapdragon is the most mysterious of all the agents, and is depicted as being a quiet, observing individual, much like Kabuki although much more savage. There is a strong indication that Snapdragon is also just as dissociative but with a greater flair for ambush and violence. Snapdragon's costume includes gauntlets bearing the Japanese sun, a scant pair of black leather trousers and nipple tape, with occasional additions of netting and a matching jacket. The weaponry she wields includes a kusarigama chain-and-blade weapon. Snapdragon's mask bears a black band around the eyes like a blindfold, with a similar, thinner band from the mouth.
- Butoh is the final Noh assassin. Her codename literally translates as "Dancer", an apt name, considering the nature of her costume and weapons: a white ballet leotard and tights with razor-edged folding fans. Little is revealed about Butoh's past or even her present, though Volume 3: Masks of The Noh sheds a brief light on her thought process. She is very methodical, or even mechanical, in her training and activities for The Noh. She states that even she is not what she appears – something which is never expanded upon. Her mask is a simple smiling face with rosy cheeks.

All Noh assassins bear a dragon tattoo on the back. The dragon wings spread to cover both shoulders, while the tail reaches to the lower back area. A bulletproof kabuki mask covers the face, to conceal the identity. The mask is made of the ceramic lightweight material that used for Japanese bullet trains, and is stronger than metal. Boots and utility belts are included. The eyes of the mask are connected to a red visor, which allows the assassin to share their vision with the Noh via camera-link, all while processing data. The general color and clothing is black leather and silk, which makes it easy for an assassin to avoid detection while moving about in shadows and darkness. The silk is mostly used to cover the arms to conceal arm movements. The body armor worn is bulletproof. All assassins have individual designs to suit them. For example, spikes are worn as part of Scarab's assassin garb, because her armor design is based on a sketch that Yukio drew in his spare time. Scarab's appearance may be considered the most fancy look among the eight assassins. The Noh assassins are highly skilled with Neo Warsaw Pact and NATO firearms, Okinawan black market weaponry, hand-to-hand combat, and attack and defense using the environment. The preferred weapons of choice are usually handguns, and various bladed weapons. The long fingernails are sometimes dipped in poisoned nail polish. Each assassin has her own favorite weapons that she normally prefers to carry out her missions.

=== The Kai Syndicate ===
- Ryuichi Kai is a politician who is also leader of the Kai Syndicate. He is the real father of Kabuki, from the time he raped and mutilated her mother. Upon learning of Ukiko's existence, he soon finds her and viciously scars her face with the word "kabuki", just as he did with her mother. An avid reader, he enjoys readings on philosophers, such as Friedrich Nietzsche in his spare time.
- Cowboy is a photogenic criminal.
- Johnny Yamamoto
- Violet
- Link Kinoshita

=== Other characters ===
- Seiko Saito was Keiko's childhood friend who was also murdered by Yamamoto Gumi. She and Keiko first met at an orphanage. As a rebel, she has spent time going through different foster families, due to the indifference that she had towards groups, institutions, organizations, gangs, politics of organized religion, and rules in general. A practitioner of body modification, she has had her ears, eyebrows, and navel pierced. For this, she was often nicknamed "Voodoo Doll", as well as "Psycho-Seiko", due to her very short temper, and love of recklessness and confrontation. She believed in God and Christianity, and possessed good knowledge and understanding of the Holy Bible.
- Tsukiko is the mother of Ukiko, who died while giving birth to her. A woman of Ainu descent, she was the lover of Ukiko's grandfather, but was raped and scarred by Kai out of resentment on the evening before her wedding. When the general found Tsukiko, her eyes were gone and the word "kabuki" had been carved into her back. Her name means "tsuki no musume (つきのむすめ)" or "daughter of the moon". Ukiko often sees her in her dreams, and as able to describe her countenance.
- Yukio is the deceased lover of Scarab, who was murdered by Yamamoto Gumi. Not much else is known about him, although he enjoyed sketching, collecting and creating figurines, and tinkering with his bike. He possibly was a writer, who enjoyed poetry, as well as pithy sayings.
- Yamamoto Gumi is a group of Yakuza that Yukio once worked and ran errands for.
- M.C. Square is another inmate at Control Corps. Lively and highly intelligent, she has an obsession with numbers, math, and arithmetic.
- Akemi is a veterinarian/artist who works at the Little Friend Animal Clinic. A former Noh agent, the original Tigerlilly, she is Kabuki's fellow inmate at Control Corps, and helps her to survive and escape the institution. It is suggested to the reader that either she and Ukiko are closer than friends, or is perhaps she is an alter-ego of Ukiko herself. Her name is a semi-homophonic similarity to the word "Alchemy".
- Kenji is a mysterious young man, who has connections to the Noh, as well as law. Not much is known about him, although he was responsible for the recruiting of Keiko.
- General Kai is the father of Ryuchi, as well as Ukiko's grandfather. He was the husband of Tsukiko, but tragically is the grandfather of Ukiko, given the shameful truth that it was his own son who raped and scarred Tsukiko.

== Publications ==
The complete story is told through these volumes, beginning with Fear the Reaper/Circle of Blood, and leading up to The Alchemy.

- Kabuki Fear The Reaper 48 page introduction story (first issue in 1994).
- Kabuki: Circle of Blood - consists of Kabuki: Fear the Reaper and Circle of Blood #1–6
- Kabuki: Dreams - consists of Kabuki Color Special, Kabuki: Dreams of the Dead, Kabuki #1/2, and The Ghost Play
- Kabuki: Masks of Noh - consists of Masks of the Noh #1–4
- Kabuki: Skin Deep - consists of Kabuki: Skin Deep #1–3
- Kabuki: Metamorphosis - consists of Kabuki #1–9
- Kabuki: Scarab, Lost in Translation - consists of Kabuki: Scarab #1–8 and new material (Image Comics, 2002, ISBN 1-58240-258-2)
- Kabuki: The Alchemy - limited series, 9 issues (Marvel Comics, 2009, ISBN 078513249X)

=== Related titles ===
Volumes not connected to the main Kabuki storyline:

- Kabuki: Dance of Death
- Kabuki Images #1-#2 (1998, 1999) - collections of additional Kabuki stories and artwork
- Kabuki: Reflections #1-#15 (1998-2009) - non-narrative collections of Kabuki-related art
- Dream Logic - further non-narrative collections of Kabuki-related and other art

== Film ==
David Mack has been working on a live-action Kabuki feature film for 20th Century Fox. Besides writing the treatment, his credits include: visual designer, creative consultant and co-producer. The release date is unknown.

== Toys ==
In the late 1990s, Moore Action Collectibles released several action figures and variants based on the character Kabuki; further releases were planned, but never came about. In 2004, Scarab received an action figure and variants from Diamond Select Toys. In 2005, a Kabuki Minimate was released in the Indie Comics Boxset along with Magdalena, Dawn and Witchblade. In 2009, Shocker Toys released a Kabuki figure as part of the first series of its "Indie Spotlight" line.

Figures of Kabuki, Tigerlily, Scarab and Siamese were released for the Heroclix collectable figure game by Wizkids / NECA. This was as part of the Indyclix expansion to the game. There were 3 versions each of Kabuki, Tigerlily, and Scarab, and only 1 of Siamese, which was a "Unique" figure and much rarer. Due to the sculptor using a particular comic panel for his image of Tigerlily, she was designed wealding twin Uzzi machine pistols rather than her usual blades, resulting in confusion among players and fans, as all 3 of her game pieces had no "range" value.

== Reception ==
Kabuki took part in IGN's Battle of the Comic-Book Babes contest in 2005, losing against Mystique.
