= Dawn (comics) =

Comics character

Publication information
- Publisher: Cry for Dawn Productions; Sirius Entertainment; Image Comics; Dynamite Entertainment
- First appearance: Cry for Dawn #1 (Dec. 1989)
- Created by: Joseph Michael Linsner

In-story information
- Full name: Dawn
- Partnerships: Darrian Ashoka
- Notable aliases: Aurora, Gaia, Goddess of Birth and Rebirth, Isis, Kali, Mary, The Goddess/The Triple Goddess
- Abilities: Immortal, immune to gunfire, inter-planar travel

Dawn is an American comic book character created by writer/artist Joseph Michael Linsner. Dawn was first envisioned by Linsner in 1987; she first appeared in an official publication in 1989.

== Publication history ==
Dawn was first featured on the cover of Cry for Dawn #1 (Cry for Dawn Productions, Dec. 1989), and appeared on all the covers of Cry for Dawn (9 issues in all) from 1989 to 1991. In 1994, she was featured in her own one-shot drama from new publisher Sirius Entertainment, and then the Sirius limited series Dawn: Lucifer's Halo and Dawn: Return of the Goddess.

The character moved to Image Comics for Dawn: Three Tiers, Dawn: Not to Touch the Earth (2010), and Dawn: The Swordmaster's Daughter (2013). In 2014–2015, she was featured in the five-issue limited series Dawn/Vampirella, published by Dynamite Entertainment.

== Fictional biography ==
Dawn is the goddess of birth and rebirth. She is the guardian of all the witches on Earth, and the goddess to whom they pray.

Dawn is immortal, immune to gunfire, and capable of traveling to various dimensions and planes of reality. She is shown in many different facets, shapes, sizes, and colors; her appearance depends on who is viewing her. She is generally depicted as a young, red-haired woman with three "tears" running from her left eye (and one running from her right eye, which is usually hidden by her long hair); during the witch hunt, witches were discovered to only cry from their left eyes.

She also has a rose on her right wrist and a chain on her left. The rose represents Hell, and although it has beauty, it only pricks and hurts a person; the chain represents Heaven because a person can only go so far before they are stopped short by its restrictions.

Dawn's lover is Cernunnos (sometimes also known as the Horned God), the god of death, who has incarnated himself in the mortal form of Darrian Ashoka. Darrian, unaware of his true origins, lives in a post-apocalyptic New York City when he first meets Dawn. She leads him on his path of true identity and self-discovery.

== Collected editions ==
- Cry for Dawn (Cry for Dawn Productions, 1989–1992). 9-issue anthology. Dawn only appears on the covers.
- Dawn: Lucifer's Halo (Sirius Entertainment, 1995–1997). 6-issue limited series, originally published as Dawn.
- Crypt of Dawn (Sirius Entertainment, 1996–1999. 6-issue anthology.
- Dawn: Return of the Goddess (Sirius Entertainment, 1999–2000). 4-issue limited series.
- Dawn: Three Tiers (Image Comics, 2003–2005). 6-issue limited series.
- Dawn: Not to Touch the Earth (Image Comics, 2010) One-shot.
- Dawn: The Swordmaster's Daughter & Other Stories (Image Comics 2013). One-shot.
- Dawn/Vampirella (Dynamite Entertainment, 2014–2015): 5-issue limited series; collected in Dawn/Vampirella (Dynamite Entertainment, 2019)

== In other media ==
- Dawn is featured on the Gary Numan CD album Dawn, released in the UK as Sacrifice).
- For several years, a Dawn lookalike contest was held at Dragon Con.
- In the fall of 2010, in conjunction with the Hero Initiative and Joseph Michael Linsner, Black Phoenix Alchemy Lab released four Dawn-inspired perfume oils. Proceeds from the sale of those oils go to the Hero Initiative. In 2012, Black Phoenix Alchemy Lab released another Dawn-inspired perfume: Dawn: Mourning Victory; part of the proceeds again went to the Hero Initiative.
