= The Abandoned (2006 film) =

- Theatrical release poster
- Directed by: Nacho Cerdà
- Written by: Nacho Cerdà; Karim Hussain; Richard Stanley
- Produced by: Carlos Fernández; Julio Fernández
- Starring: Anastasia Hille; Carlos Reig; Valentin Ganev; Karel Roden
- Cinematography: Xavi Giménez
- Edited by: Jorge Macaya
- Music by: Alfons Conde
- Production companies: Filmax; Future Films; Radiovision Plus
- Distributed by: Momentum Pictures (United Kingdom); Filmax (Spain)
- Release dates: 11 September 2006 (TIFF); 27 April 2007 (Spain)
- Running time: 94 minutes
- Countries: Spain; United Kingdom; Bulgaria
- Languages: English; Spanish; Russian
- Budget: $3–4 million
- Box office: $4.2 million

The Abandoned is a 2006 horror film co-written and directed by Nacho Cerdà and starring Anastasia Hille, Carlos Reig, Valentin Ganev, and Karel Roden. The film is about an American film producer who returns to her homeland, Russia, to discover the truth about her family history. It is an international co-production between Bulgaria, Spain, and the United Kingdom.

== Plot ==
A Russian peasant family is eating dinner when a truck stops in the front yard. The father opens the door of the truck to find a dead woman and two crying infants in the seat next to her.

Marie Jones, an American woman, is seen in a Russian hotel room making a call to her daughter; she then goes to meet a local notary, who tells her that she has inherited some property, and that she should visit it. Having been taken to the wooded island, she finds that the house is dilapidated and inhabited by zombie-like creatures, one of whom looks like her. Having attempted to escape, she meets Nikolai, who tells her that they are fraternal twins, adopted separately following the murder of their mother.

The house seems to change at random between dilapidation and domestication. Threatened by the zombie-like creatures, Nikolai shoots one of them in the leg, only to find that the wound appears on his own body. He deduces that they are his and Marie's doppelgängers, and that 'what happens to them happens to us'. When Nikolai falls into a hole in the floor while the house is dilapidated, Marie is unable to rescue him because the hole suddenly seals as the house changes to a domesticated state.

Marie attempts to escape by rowing across the river. After a lengthy walk on the opposite bank, she happens upon a house, only to find that it is the house she has escaped from, with Nikolai inside. He explains that their father intended to kill them along with their mother when they were babies, and that they cannot leave until he has managed to reunite the family in death. The house reverts to its state on the night of the murder, and they see their father returning home.

Nikolai tells Marie that they can escape in the truck along with their mother and their younger selves. While searching for the truck, Marie finds her father's now desiccated body in the barn, and is then pushed into a pseudo-past where she realizes her father and the notary are the same person. She flees his office in the present and runs into her past self as she comes up the steps, and continues fleeing into the sunlight until she finds herself back in the house, this time between the past and the present, where the apparition of her father explains that he has always loved his children and his wife, and could not let them leave him.

Marie runs from him and finds Nikolai's body being eaten by boars. When her doppelgänger comes after her, Marie flees to the truck parked outside and drives away. Marie's father's voice comes over the radio, telling her to return and join the family he has created. The bridge that brought her there has been destroyed, and she plunges into the river, drowning.

The film ends with Marie's daughter, Emily, explaining that she knew her mother would never return. It has been a long time since her mother left for Russia, and Emily has never had the desire to know what happened to Marie or her parents, breaking the cycle and leaving her abandoned.

== Cast ==
- Anastasia Hille as Marie Jones
- Karel Roden as Nikolai
- Valentin Ganev as Andrei Misharin / Kolya Kaidonovsky
- Paraskeva Dyukelova as Olga Kaidonovskaya
- Carlos Reig-Plaza as Anatoliy
- Kalin Arsov as Bearded Russian Patriarch Man In 1966
- Svetlana Smoleva as Bearded Patriarch's Wife In 1966
- Anna Panayotova as Bearded Patriarch's Daughter In 1966
- Yordanka Angelova as Blind Woman, Present Day
- Valentin Toshev as Patriarch, Present Day
- Jasmina Marinova as Patriarch's Wife
- Monica Baunova as Emily
- Marta Yaneva as Natalya

== Production ==
The film was originally written by Karim Hussain and set to be directed by him, but it was shelved. Nacho Cerdà, a friend of Hussain's who had been impressed by the screenplay, later suggested the film as a project for Filmax. As Hussain was involved in another film at the time, Cerdà took over directing duties. Richard Stanley was brought in to polish the script. For casting, Cerdà insisted on an unknown actor to star, despite the studio pushing for Nastassja Kinski or Holly Hunter. The film was originally known as Los Abandonados, under which it played at Sitges Film Festival. Cerdà disliked that name, but Stanley preferred that, as it sounded like a Spaghetti Western. Cerdà is a fan of slow-paced, atmospheric horror films and wanted to make something that wasn't a Saw or Hostel clone. Major themes include the past, emotional dependency and forging your own identity.

== Release ==
The Abandoned was first released in the US as part of the After Dark Horrorfest in November 2006. The film received a stand-alone release in cinemas in February 2007. The total domestic gross was $1,331,137, and the total worldwide gross was $4,153,578. The DVD was released on 19 June 2007 and includes a short "Behind the Scenes" featurette. It was released theatrically in Spain on 27 April 2007.

== Reception ==
Rotten Tomatoes, a review aggregator, reports that the film received positive reviews from 38% of 34 surveyed critics, and the average rating was 4.7/10; the consensus is: "The Abandoned spends so much time setting up the creepy atmosphere, that it forgets to inhabit it with genuine spooks or scares." On Metacritic, the film had a weighted average score of 42 out of 100 based on 8 critics, indicating "mixed or average" reviews. Dennis Harvey of Variety called The Abandoned a "minimally plotted but beautifully atmospheric nightmare" and predicted that it would be popular among cult film fans who favor "arty, surreal Euro-horror". Bloody Disgusting rated the film 4.5/5 stars and wrote that it is "the most genuinely scary and intelligent horror film since Session 9" with a "rare perfect mix of substance and style." Joshua Siebalt of Dread Central rated it 4.5/5 stars and called it "creepy, genuinely scary, and above all else, original." Scott Tobias of The A.V. Club rated the film B and said that it "is a rare horror film that moves from the real world into a kind of psychic space, and slowly suffocates its characters inside their own heads." Owen Gleiberman of Entertainment Weekly rated it D− and said it "sinks so deep into deathly atmosphere that there's no life to it." Jim Ridley of The Village Voice described it as "a punishing dose of zombie Chekhov for lifetime Fangoria subscribers" and "style in search of a movie". Erin Meister of the Boston Globe called it "more of an exercise in audience torture than titillation" that makes no sense.

== See also ==
- List of Spanish films of 2007
