= Planetary (comics) =

American comic book series

- The Planetary team (back to front): The Drummer, Jakita Wagner and Elijah Snow by John Cassaday and Laura Martin.

Publication information
- Publisher: Wildstorm (DC Comics)
- Schedule: Erratic
- Genre: Action/adventure, science fiction, thriller
- Publication date: September 1998 – October 2009
- No. of issues: 27
- Main character(s): Jakita Wagner; The Drummer; Elijah Snow

Creative team
- Created by: Warren Ellis; John Cassaday
- Written by: Warren Ellis
- Artist: John Cassaday
- Colorist: Laura Martin

Collected editions
- All Over the World and Other Stories: ISBN 1-56389-648-6

Planetary is an American comic book series created by writer Warren Ellis and artist John Cassaday, and published by the Wildstorm imprint of DC Comics. After an initial preview issue in September 1998, the series ran for 27 issues from April 1999 to October 2009.

== Publication history ==
Planetary was previewed in issue #33 of Gen^{13} and issue #6 of C-23, both dated September 1998. The first issue of the series was cover-dated April 1999. Originally intended to be a 24-issue bi-monthly series, the series was on hold from 2001 to 2003 due to illness of writer Warren Ellis and other commitments by Cassaday. Laura Martin (also credited as Laura DePuy) colored almost every issue of the series. The main story concluded with issue #26 in October 2006; the concluding issue #27 released three years later in October 2009.

Ellis intended the focus of the book to be the superhero genre, rather than the superheroes themselves: "I wanted to do something that actually went deeper into the subgenre, exposed its roots and showed its branches" and stated in his proposal for the comic series: "[...] What if you had a hundred years of superhero history just slowly leaking out into this young and modern superhero world of the Wildstorm Universe? What if you could take everything old and make it new again?"

Rich Kreiner described John Cassaday's artwork in The Comics Journal as being "close to the gold standard for fabulous realism in mainstream comics". Tom Underhill noted colorist Laura Martin's contribution as "every bit as compelling" as Cassaday's in his review for The Comics Journal.

One of the main features of the series is the portrayal of alternate versions of many figures from popular culture, such as Godzilla, Tarzan, Sherlock Holmes, and Doc Savage. This extends to comic book characters from both DC Comics (e.g. Superman, Green Lantern, and Wonder Woman) and Marvel Comics (e.g. the Fantastic Four, the Hulk, and Thor).

Ellis also introduced the concept of a multiverse to the series, drawing upon the mathematical concept known as the Monster group for inspiration. The multiverse is described as "a theoretical snowflake existing in 196,833 dimensional space", a reference to the visualization method used by some mathematicians when describing the Monster group.

== Plot ==
In 1999, Elijah Snow, a reclusive centenarian and former adventurer with cryokinesis powers, reluctantly accepts recruitment by the field team of Planetary, an organization that investigates the "secret history" of the twentieth century. The field team, also made up of superhuman Jakita Wagner and a technopath called only the Drummer, is supported by a network of global offices, specialists, and equipment, and unconditionally funded by an unidentified, unseen patron called the "Fourth Man." On their missions, the field team encounter concepts from speculative fiction in the flesh, such as pulp magazine heroes, superheroes, kaiju, wuxia and gun fu, a superspy, B movie monsters, Jules Verne's imaginary technology, and interstellar starships. The team embraces the fantastical nature of their findings, embodied by the mantra: "It's a strange world; let's keep it that way."

Restless after several missions spent passively observing, Snow grows proactive, committing Planetary support to crew a stranded interdimensional "shiftship." He is also briefed on Planetary's conflict against the Four—Randall Dowling, Kim Süskind, William Leather, and Jacob Greene—a superpowered rival group who have hunted and hoarded hidden wonders as trophies through decades of covert black operations. Learning the extent of the Four's wanton atrocities, Snow becomes invested in missions to liberate life-saving technology from the Four and to recover and assist victims of Science City Zero, a concentration camp used by Dowling for human experimentation. However, Snow is disquieted by gaps in his own knowledge, which disadvantage him against the Four, as well as his teammates.

Aided by secret agent John Stone, Snow regains many lost memories, including various secret adventures he documented in a publication called the Planetary Guide. He remembers that he himself is the Fourth Man and the field team his trusted colleagues, but after a failed operation against the Four, he submitted to memory blocks and exile by Dowling in exchange for the team's lives. Fearing the Four's reprisal should Snow regain his memory, the team had sought to return him to the field while treating him as a stranger. Snow also remembers former team member Ambrose Chase, able to alter the laws of physics inside a limited field, who was seemingly fatally shot by a Dowling operative, but inexplicably vanished, leaving no body.

Re-assuming leadership, Snow actively opposes the Four, thwarting their plans and turning their allies before targeting their members outright: he captures and tortures Leather, and sacrifices the observation of a unique extraterrestrial object to permanently strand Greene off-planet. Wagner is alienated by Snow's seemingly vindictive turn, but the Drummer, who was rescued by Snow from the Four and knows that Snow saved Wagner as a baby, trusts that his goal is to save lives above all.

After the field team evades an orbital death ray attack by Dowling and Suskind, they subdue Stone, who was outed by Leather as the Four's informant. Stone reveals the Four's true goal: to subjugate Earth ahead of a planned invasion by a hostile parallel Earth, seven of whose inhabitants made a previous attempt in 1945, as repayment for granting the Four's superpowers. Snow contacts Dowling and demands the Four's entire database of knowledge, and their capitulation, in exchange for sparing their lives, despite seemingly possessing no weapon as leverage.

Bemused, Dowling and Süskind meet Snow at his chosen location, delivering their database, but not their surrender. Snow launches the now-crewed shiftship, long buried underground, opening a vast chasm and dropping Dowling and Süskind to their deaths. Snow visits the hostile Earth by shiftship and, to deter their invasion, issues an ultimatum threatening their annihilation.

Planetary deploys the recovered technology worldwide non-commercially, greatly advancing scientific and humanitarian progress. Meanwhile, theorizing that Chase is alive, but suspended in a field of stopped time, Snow orders the construction of a time machine to collapse the field by a frame-dragging effect, overruling the Drummer's fear that, according to quantum mechanics, the advent of time travel would predetermine the entire future timeline by wave function collapse. However, Snow personally turns on the time machine, and his intent to keep the world strange, exerted by the observer effect, manifests many timelines instead of one: while Chase is retrieved and successfully triaged, numerous versions of the field team all arrive from different futures, promising yet more adventures to come.

== Outsiders ==
The 2023-24 DC Comics series Outsiders, written by Jackson Lanzing and Collin Kelly, revived the premise of Planetary in the DC Universe: the DC characters Luke Fox and Batwoman, teaming with a woman identifying as the Drummer, embark on missions to investigate the DC Universe's secret history, embodied by its many continuity reboots. The new Drummer reveals herself to be Jakita Wagner, the sole survivor of the Planetary continuity becoming erased in one such reboot.

== Collected editions ==
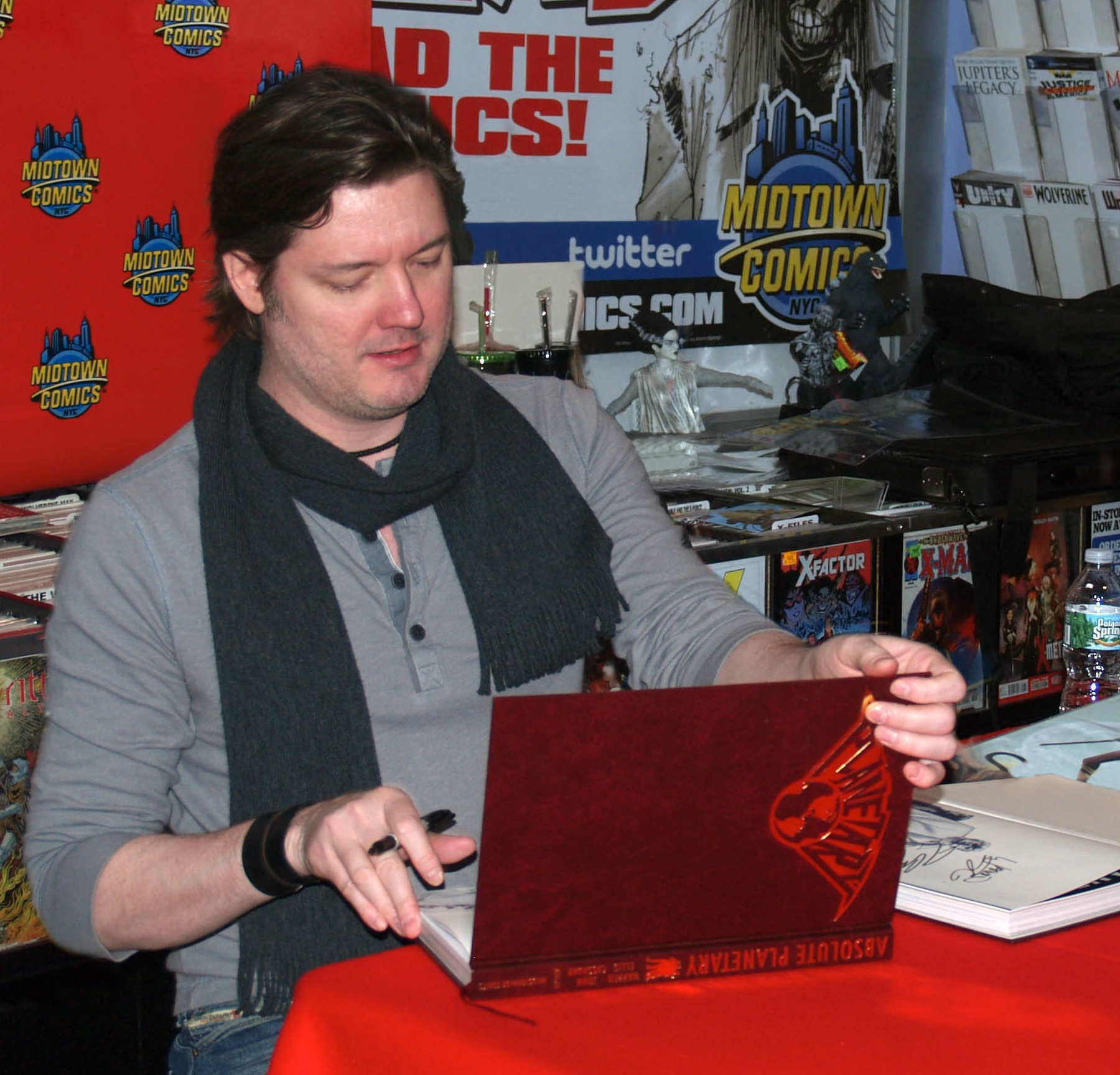
Artist John Cassaday signing copies of the hardcover collection during an appearance at Midtown Comics.

The series, and spin-offs, have been collected into a number of volumes:

- Planetary:
  - Volume 1: All Over the World and Other Stories (collects Preview & #1–6; hardcover and softcover ISBN 1-56389-648-6)
  - Volume 2: The Fourth Man (collects #7–12; hardcover and softcover ISBN 1-56389-764-4)
  - Volume 3: Leaving the 20th Century (collects #13–18; hardcover ISBN 1-4012-0293-4 and softcover ISBN 1-4012-0294-2)
  - Volume 4: Spacetime Archaeology (collects #19–27; hardcover ISBN 1-4012-0996-3 and softcover ISBN 1-4012-2345-1)
- Planetary: Crossing Worlds (collects the three crossover one-shots above; softcover only ISBN 1-4012-0279-9)
- Planetary Book One (collects #1–14, Planetary Sneak Peek, and Planetary/The Authority: Ruling the World; also script to #1, character design sketches) ISBN 1-4012-7166-9) (July 2017) (softcover)
- Planetary Book Two (collects #15–27, Planetary/JLA: Terra Occulta, and Planetary/Batman: Night on Earth) ISBN 1-4012-7799-3) (March 2018) (softcover)
- Absolute Planetary volume 1 (collects Preview & #1–12, also script to #1; slipcased hardcover ISBN 1-4012-0327-2)
- Absolute Planetary volume 2 (collects #13–27; slipcased hardcover ISBN 1-4012-2701-5)
- The Planetary Omnibus (collects Preview, #1–27, plus the three crossover one-shots above, also script to #1, character design sketches, and cover art for both Absolute Editions and the four trade paperbacks); hardcover only ISBN 1-4012-4238-3)

== Awards ==
- 2000:
  - Nominated for "Best Continuing Series" Eisner Award
  - Nominated for "Best New Series" Eisner Award
- 2002: Nominated for "Best Continuing Series" Eisner Award
- 2005: Nominated for "Best Serialized Story" Eisner Award, for Planetary #19–20 ("Mystery in Space/Rendezvous")
