= Nacho Cerdà =

Spanish film director

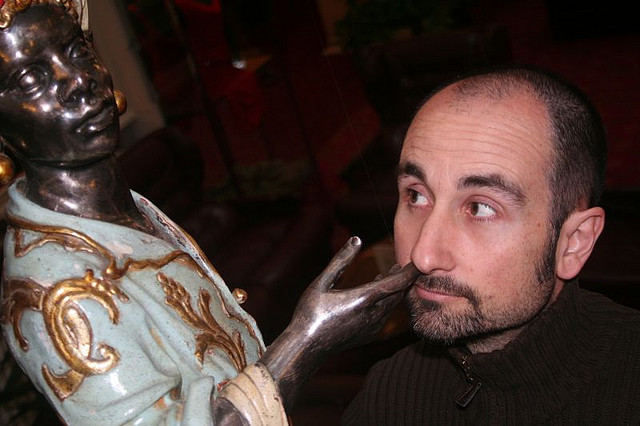
- Cerdà in 2007
- Born: Ignacio Cerdà; 1968 or 1969 (age 56–57); Catalonia, Spain
- Occupation: Film director
- Known for: Aftermath

Nacho Cerdà (born 1968/1969) is a Spanish film director and screenwriter best known for his controversial 1994 short film Aftermath.

== Biography ==
=== Career ===
==== Shorts ====
Aftermath is the second in a trilogy of short films known as La Trilogia De La Muerte (The Trilogy of Death). The first film, Awakening, runs for only 8 minutes. Created in 1990, it tells of a boy for whom time stops upon falling asleep in a classroom, only later realizing that he had actually died and was experiencing an out-of-body phenomenon. The 1994 sequel, Aftermath, runs at a significantly longer time of 32 minutes, which depicts defilement, mutilation, and necrophilia (see Necrophilia in popular culture for more). The 35 minute finale, Genesis (1998), shows the life of a sculptor whose artwork comes to life while he turns to stone, his work gradually consuming him. The trilogy represents the three stages of life, and in each instance, Cerdà shows how vulnerable we are to the whims of elements beyond our control; time, others, and material possessions respectively.

==== Features ====
Cerdà also directed The Abandoned which is about an American film producer who returns to her homeland, Russia, to discover the truth about her family history. The film was first released in the US as part of the After Dark Horrorfest in November 2006. The film received a stand-alone release in theaters in February 2007. The DVD was released on June 19, 2007.

In 2011, Paris-based Full House announced that Cerdà would be directing an adaptation of the comic book I Am Legion. The film will be written by Richard Stanley.

== Personal life ==
Cerdà collects film prints and has a collection of a hundred. He is a fan of atmospheric 1970s horror films, and seeing Jaws in the cinema at age six led him to pursue a career in filmmaking.
