= The Hero Initiative =

Not-for-profit organization for comic book industry

- Formation: 2000
- Type: 501(c)(3) Non-profit
- Legal status: Charity
- Headquarters: 11301 Olympic Blvd., #587
- Location: Los Angeles
- President: Jim McLauchlin
- Website: heroinitiative.org

The Hero Initiative, formerly known as A Commitment to Our Roots, or ACTOR, is a not-for-profit organization dedicated to helping comic book creators, writers, and artists in need. Founded in late 2000 by a consortium of comic book and trade publishers, including Marvel Comics, Image Comics, Dark Horse Comics, Wizard Entertainment, CrossGen Comics and Dynamic Forces Inc., the 501(c)(3) charity aims to assist comic creators with health, medical, and quality-of-life assistance.

== Eligibility ==
According to the Hero Initiative, "to be eligible for financial assistance from Hero, an applicant must have been a working comic book writer, penciler, inker, colorist or letterer on a work-for-hire basis for no less than 10 years since January 1, 1934."

== Board of directors ==
The Hero Initiative has two boards of directors: the Executive Board and the Fund Disbursement Board.

The Executive Board, which handles fund raising and handles operations, comprises Hero Initiative President Jim McLauchlin, former editor-in-chief of Top Cow Comics; comics creator Brian Pulido; and Joe Quesada, editor-in-chief of Marvel Comics. The board members are Steve Borock, president of the Comics Guaranty Corporation; filmmaker Guillermo del Toro; and Beth Widera, owner of comic book convention MegaCon. Former board members include Mike Richardson, publisher and founder of Dark Horse Comics.

The Fund Disbursement Board, which hears cases for aid and makes all final decisions on whom to aid, acts independently of the Executive Board and is made up entirely of comics creators, writers, artists, and editors. It was at one point composed of (co-chairman) George Pérez, (co-chairman) Roy Thomas, (board secretary) Charlie Novinskie, Dennis O'Neil, John Romita Sr., and Jim Valentino.

The charity is currently supported by Dark Horse Comics, Dynamic Forces, Image Comics, Marvel Entertainment, Top Cow Productions, and Wizard Entertainment.

== Fundraising ==
The Hero Initiative utilizes many methods of fundraising. In 2017, the Arizona Comic Mini Expo held a Drink and Draw event to raise money for the Initiative. Several professional comic book artists provided sketches to be exchanged for donations. The money raised was split between the HERO Initiative and the ACLU of Arizona.

== Name ==
The Hero Initiative was formerly known as A Commitment to Our Roots, or ACTOR, from its founding until September 2006. While the original name of the organization reflected the charity's goal, the acronym that resulted, ACTOR, more often confused people unfamiliar with the organization. In an effort to expand the marketability and fund-raising ability of the charity, the executive board decided to change the name to something more associated with comic books, thus the new name, Hero, named after the common and recognizable comic industry word Superhero.

== Awards ==
=== Hero Initiative Lifetime Achievement Award ===
- 2006: George Pérez (1954–2022), John Romita, Sr. (1930–2023)
- 2007: Joe Kubert (1926–2012)
- 2008: Nick Cardy (1920–2013)
- 2009: Neal Adams (1941–2022)
- 2010: Walt Simonson (1946–)
- 2011: Stan Lee (1922–2018)
- 2012: John Romita, Jr. (1956–)
- 2013: Sal Buscema (1936–2026)
- 2014: Herb Trimpe (1939–2015)
- 2015: Russ Heath (1926-2018)
- 2016: Joe Giella (1928–2023)
- 2017: Marv Wolfman (1946–)
- 2018: Dennis O'Neil (1939–2020)
- 2019: José Luis García-López (1948–)
- 2020: No award presented due to the COVID-19 pandemic
- 2021: Joe Quesada (1962–)
- 2022: Steve Geppi (1950–)
- 2023: Chris Claremont (1950–)

=== Dick Giordano Humanitarian of the Year Award ===
In 2010, The Hero Initiative created The Dick Giordano Humanitarian of the Year Award, named after former board member Dick Giordano, who had died earlier in the year. The award recognizes one person in comics each year who demonstrates particular generosity and integrity in support of the overall comic book community. It debuted at the 2010 Harvey Awards ceremony held at the Baltimore Comic-Con.

- 2010: Tim Sale (1956–2022), Jerry Robinson (1922–2011)
- 2011: Mike Gold (1950–)
- 2012: Joe Kubert (1926–2012)
- 2013: Paul Levitz (1956–)
- 2014: Stan Goldberg (1932–2014)
- 2015: Denis Kitchen (1946–)
- 2016: Beth Widera (19??–)
- 2017: Joshua Dysart (1971–)
- 2018: Marc Andreyko (1970–)
- 2019: Louise Simonson (1946–)
- 2020: No award presented due to the COVID-19 pandemic
- 2021: Gene Ha (19??–)
- 2022: Scott Dunbier (19??–)
- 2023: Al Milgrom (1950–)
