= The Official Marvel Graphic Novel Collection =

Partwork magazine

Issue 22, Volume 48: "Marvel Zombies"

The Official Marvel Graphic Novel Collection (also referred to as The Ultimate Graphic Novels Collection) is a fortnightly partwork magazine published by Hachette Partworks. The series is a collection of special edition hardback graphic novels, collecting all the parts in a story arc for one of Marvel's best known superheroes, often a fan-favourite or "important" story from Marvel comics lore.

The series is published in the UK, Russia, Ireland, Australia, New Zealand and South Africa by Hachette Partworks, in Poland by Hachette Polska, in the Czech Republic and Slovakia by Panini Fascicule, in Argentina, Brazil, Colombia, Perú and Chile by Editorial Salvat, in Bulgaria by Hachette Fascicoli and in France and Germany by the French mother company of Hachette Collections. The first English-language issue was published in December 2011 priced at £2.99 (R29.95 in SA, $7.95 in AU) issue 2 was £6.99 (R79.95 in SA, $12.95 in AU) and from issue 3 onwards it was its normal price of £9.99 (R109.95 in SA, $19.95 in AU).

The series proved so successful for publisher Hachette Partworks that they launched a second series of 130 fortnightly graphic novel hardbacks entitled Marvel's Mightiest Heroes Graphic Novel Collection and a third (non-Marvel) series of 90 fortnightly graphic novel hardbacks entitled Judge Dredd: The Mega Collection, a fourth series of 100 fortnightly graphic novel hardbacks called Transformers: The Definitive G1 Collection (featuring Generation One strips from Marvel US and UK, Dreamwave and IDW) and a fifth series of 80 fortnightly graphic novel hardbacks entitled 2000 AD: The Ultimate Collection. It also inspired a similar partwork line from DC Comics and Eaglemoss Collections, the DC Comics Graphic Novel Collection and one featuring Star Trek comics from the sixties up until modern comics called Star Trek Graphic Novel Collection, and at the end of 2017 an even newer collection also by Eaglemoss DC Comics – The Legend of Batman.

The collection was later re-released with alternative numbering in 2016, which concluded with Issue 170 in September 2022.

== Book content ==
As well as the comic strip, each book features an introduction to the book, information on the character, writer and artist plus some of the artist's draft board sketches. 60 books are required to build up a panoramic picture on the spine by artist Gabriele Dell'Otto. In April 2014, a flyer accompanying issue #62 revealed the artwork by Dell'Otto had been extended to cover 120 volumes rather than the original 60.

Each issue number of the collection is not the same as the books volume number (e.g. issue #1 is volume 21) as the volume number is the chronological release order of the original publication, whereas the issue number is the order in which they were released within this collection. Issue #1 was launched twice in the UK. Early subscribers to issue #1 (volume 21) may have received an edition with a different spine from those that subscribed to the subsequent launch. The panoramic artwork on the spine of this edition does not align with the volumes 20 or 22.

=== Magazine ===
The first issue came with an extra magazine which contained information on the collection and short descriptions on some characters which will feature in the upcoming books. It also included some character history. The magazine also folded out into a giant poster depicting Marvel universe heroes drawn by Leinil Francis Yu.

== List of books ==
Below is a list of the books from each issue in published date order. Only the first six issues were officially announced, but each issue features a further reading section which advertised future books and their volume number, though not release number. Early into the run, customer support provided a list of books to be published from issue seven onwards which was unverified, but proved to be accurate for sometime. The full list of issues was confirmed on the Hachette Partworks website but later removed as the order for some issues altered slightly. Subsequently, via the collections official website the set was announced to continue for a further 60 issues. The release order for issues #73–120 was later verified via BookDepository.com In April 2016, the May catalogue for PreviewsUK confirmed that an issue #121 would be released as part of the original collection. Subsequently, via the official Facebook page, it was confirmed that the original collection would now continue for a further 20 issues, therefore extending the set to 140. In reply to a comment on the collection's Facebook page in May 2017, confirmation was made that the collection will now expand to 170 titles. Later in December, in reply to an email, a Facebook user was told that this has now been expanded, yet again with no prewarning to subscribers, to 200.

The collection has been confirmed as being extended again to 220 issues, with zero notification, in reply to a query as to the end number on one of Hatchetts Facebook posts in July 2019. The exact phrasing was to run to 220, not that it will end at 220. In April 2020, in response to a Facebook comment, the collection has been extended to 250 issues.

In a Facebook post in June 2021, Hachette confirmed that the Original Marvel Graphic Novel Collection (2011) would be extended to 280 issues and the more recent Marvel Graphic Novel Collection (2016) would be extended to 170 issues.

In a post by British Comic Heroes via Facebook in June 2022 it was said that Hachette were calling time on the Marvel - The Ultimate Graphic Novel Collection at issue 280, however in later post, British Comic Heroes clarified that the Hatchette announcement did not actually confirm this.

Subscribers to the more recent Marvel Graphic Novel Collection (2016) received a letter with their package containing issue 170 advising the collection had now ended. This confirmed the 2016 collection would be ending 110 graphic novels short of the original 2012 collection.

The table below contains the full list of issues as per the original printing of the collection beginning in December 2011. The final volume (280) was released in October, 2022 after nearly eleven years.

Issue	Original Vol	Title	Collecting	First Print Release Date
1	21	The Amazing Spider-Man: Coming Home	Amazing Spider-Man (Vol. 2) #30–35	28 Dec 2011
2	2	Uncanny X-Men: Dark Phoenix	Uncanny X-Men #129–137	11 Jan 2012
3	43	Iron Man: Extremis	The Invincible Iron Man (Vol. 4) #1–6	25 Jan 2012
4	28	The Ultimates: Super-Human	The Ultimates #1–6	8 Feb 2012
5	9	The Amazing Spider-Man: Birth of Venom	The Amazing Spider-Man #252, 256–259, 300, Web Of Spider-Man #1 and excerpt from Fantastic Four #274, The Amazing Spider-Man #298–299	22 Feb 2012
6	52	Thor: Reborn	Thor (Vol. 3) #1–6	7 Mar 2012
7	44	Captain America: Winter Soldier	Captain America (Vol. 5) #8–9 and #11–14	21 Mar 2012
8	11	The Incredible Hulk: Silent Screams	The Incredible Hulk #370–377	4 Apr 2012
9	4	Wolverine: Wolverine	Wolverine #1–4	18 Apr 2012
10	36	Astonishing X-Men: Gifted	Astonishing X-Men (Vol. 3) #1–6	2 May 2012
11	3	Captain Britain: A Crooked World	Marvel Superheroes UK #387–388, The Daredevils #1–11 and The Mighty World Of Marvel (Vol. 2) #7–13	16 May 2012
12	14	Avengers: Forever (Part 1)	Avengers Forever #1–6	30 May 2012
13	10	The Amazing Spider-Man: Kraven's Last Hunt	Web of Spider-Man #31–32, The Amazing Spider-Man #293–294, and Peter Parker, Spectacular Spider-Man #131–132	13 Jun 2012
14	27	Captain America: The New Deal	Captain America (Vol. 4) #1–6	27 Jun 2012
15	13	Marvels	Marvels #0–4	11 Jul 2012
16	34	Avengers: Disassembled	Avengers #500–503 & Avengers Finale	25 Jul 2012
17	23	New X-Men: E is for Extinction	New X-Men #114–117	8 Aug 2012
18	33	Secret War	Secret War #1–5	22 Aug 2012
19	15	Avengers: Forever (Part 2)	Avengers Forever #7–12	5 Sep 2012
20	8	Daredevil: Born Again	Daredevil #227–233	19 Sep 2012
21	35	She-Hulk: Single Green Female	She-Hulk #1–6	3 Oct 2012
22	48	Marvel Zombies	Marvel Zombies #1–5	17 Oct 2012
23	45	The Incredible Hulk: Planet Hulk (Part 1)	Incredible Hulk (Vol. 2) #92–99	31 Oct 2012
24	18	Punisher: Welcome Back Frank (Part 1)	The Punisher (Vol. 3) #1–6	14 Nov 2012
25	20	Ultimate Spider-Man: Power and Responsibility	Ultimate Spider-Man #1–7	28 Nov 2012
26	6	Marvel Super Heroes: Secret Wars (Part 1)	Marvel Super Heroes: Secret Wars #1–6	12 Dec 2012
27	16	The Mighty Thor: In Search of the Gods	The Mighty Thor (Vol. 2) #1–7	26 Dec 2012
28	37	Astonishing X-Men: Dangerous	Astonishing X-Men (Vol. 3) #7–12	9 Jan 2013
29	1	Iron Man: Demon in a Bottle	The Invincible Iron Man #120–128	23 Jan 2013
30	46	The Incredible Hulk: Planet Hulk (Part 2)	Incredible Hulk (Vol. 2) #100–105 and Amazing Fantasy (Vol. 2) #15	6 Feb 2013
31	54	Captain America: The Chosen	Captain America: The Chosen #1–6	20 Feb 2013
32	42	New Avengers: Break Out	New Avengers #1–6	6 Mar 2013
33	25	Spider-Man: Blue	Spider-Man: Blue #1–6	20 Mar 2013
34	24	New X-Men: Imperial	New X-Men #118–126	3 Apr 2013
35	40	House of M	House of M #1–8	17 Apr 2013
36	26	Wolverine: Origin	Wolverine: Origin #1–6	1 May 2013
37	30	Fantastic Four: Unthinkable	Fantastic Four (Vol. 3) #67–70 and Fantastic Four #500–502	15 May 2013
38	5	Thor: The Last Viking	The Mighty Thor #337–343	29 May 2013
39	50	Civil War	Civil War #1–7	12 Jun 2013
40	7	Marvel Super Heroes: Secret Wars (Part 2)	Marvel Super Heroes; Secret Wars #7–12	26 Jun 2013
41	31	Fantastic Four: Authoritative Action	Fantastic Four #503–511	10 Jul 2013
42	51	Fallen Son: Death of Captain America	Captain America (Vol. 5) #25 and Fallen Son: Wolverine, Captain America, Avengers, Spider-Man, and Iron Man	24 Jul 2013
43	19	Punisher: Welcome Back Frank (Part 2)	The Punisher (Vol. 3) #7–12	7 Aug 2013
44	29	The Ultimates: Homeland Security	The Ultimates #7–13	21 Aug 2013
45	12	Wolverine: Weapon X	Marvel Comics Presents #72–84	4 Sep 2013
46	32	1602	1602 #1–8	18 Sep 2013
47	17	Daredevil: Guardian Devil	Daredevil (Vol. 2) #1–8	2 Oct 2013
48	22	The Amazing Spider-Man: Revelations & Until the Stars Turn Cold	Amazing Spider-Man (Vol. 2) #37–45	16 Oct 2013
49	53	Eternals	Eternals (Vol. 3) #1–7	30 Oct 2013
50	38	Black Panther: Who Is The Black Panther	Black Panther (Vol. 4) #1–6	13 Nov 2013
51	55	World War Hulk	World War Hulk #1–5	27 Nov 2013
52	47	Fantastic Four: The End	Fantastic Four: The End #1–6	11 Dec 2013
53	59	Captain Britain and MI13: Vampire State	Captain Britain & MI-13 #10–15 and Captain Britain And MI-13 Annual #1	25 Dec 2013
54	57	Wolverine: Old Man Logan	Wolverine (Vol. 3) #66–72 and Wolverine: Giant Size Old Man Logan	8 Jan 2014
55	Classic I	Marvel Origins: The 60s	Fantastic Four #1, Amazing Fantasy #15, Incredible Hulk #1, Daredevil #1, Tales of Suspense #39, Uncanny X-Men #1, Avengers #1, Avengers #4, Tales to Astonish #27, and Tales to Astonish #44	22 Jan 2014
56	58	Secret Invasion	Secret Invasion #1–8	5 Feb 2014
57	Classic XXXIV	Uncanny X-Men: Second Genesis	Giant-Size X-Men #1 & X-Men #94–103	19 Feb 2014
58	49	Doctor Strange: The Oath	Doctor Strange: The Oath #1–5	5 Mar 2014
59	56	Thunderbolts: Faith In Monsters	Thunderbolts #110–115 and Civil War: Choosing Sides	19 Mar 2014
60	68	Venom	Venom (Vol. 2) #1–5	2 Apr 2014
61	39	Ghost Rider: Road To Damnation	Ghost Rider (Vol. 5) #1–6	16 Apr 2014
62	41	Son of M	Son of M #1–6	30 Apr 2014
63	60	Siege	Siege #1–4 and Siege: The Cabal	14 May 2014
64	Classic XII	The Avengers: Birth of Ultron	Avengers #54–60 and Avengers Annual #2	28 May 2014
65	Classic XXX	Captain America and The Falcon: Secret Empire	Captain America and the Falcon #169–176	11 June 2014
66	61	Avengers Prime	Avengers Prime #1–5	25 June 2014
67	Classic XV	X-Men: Twilight of the Mutants	X-Men #50–59	09 Jul 2014
68	Classic III	Doctor Strange: A Nameless Land, A Timeless Time	Strange Tales #130–146	23 Jul 2014
69	65	Shadowland	Shadowland #1–5	6 Aug 2014
70	Classic IV	Fantastic Four: The Coming of Galactus	Fantastic Four #44–51 and Fantastic Four Annual #3	20 Aug 2014
71	Classic VII	The Invincible Iron Man: The Tragedy and the Triumph	Tales of Suspense #91–99, Iron Man and Sub-Mariner #1 and The Invincible Iron Man #1–4	3 Sep 2014
72	72	X-Men: Schism	X-Men: Schism #1–5, Generation Hope #10–11 & X-Men: Regenesis #1	17 Sep 2014
73	Classic XXIV	The Life and Death of Captain Marvel (Part 1)	The Invincible Iron Man #55, Captain Marvel #25–30 and Marvel Feature #12	1 Oct 2014
74	Classic XI	The Incredible Hulk: This Monster Unleashed	Tales To Astonish #101, The Incredible Hulk #102–108 and Annual #1	15 Oct 2014
75	62	Secret Avengers: Mission to Mars	Secret Avengers #1–5	29 Oct 2014
76	Classic VIII	Nick Fury: Agent of S.H.I.E.L.D. (Part 1)	Strange Tales #150–162	12 Nov 2014
77	Classic XXV	The Life and Death of Captain Marvel (Part 2)	Captain Marvel #31–34, Avengers #125, and Marvel Graphic Novel #1	26 Nov 2014
78	69	Ultimate Spider-Man: The Death of Spider-Man	Ultimate Spider-Man #153–160	10 Dec 2014
79	Classic II	Thor: Tales of Asgard	Thor: Tales of Asgard #1–6	24 Dec 2014
80	Classic XXIX	Howard the Duck	Giant-Size Man-Thing #4–5, Howard the Duck #1–8 & 16, excerpts from Adventure Into Fear #19 and Man-Thing #1	7 Jan 2015
81	66	Avengers: The Children's Crusade	Uncanny X-Men #526, Avengers: The Children's Crusade #1–9 & Avengers: The Children's Crusade Young Avengers #1	21 Jan 2015
82	Classic XL	Daredevil: Marked for Murder	Daredevil #158–161 & 163–167	4 Feb 2015
83	Classic XXXII	Warlock (Part 1)	Strange Tales (Vol. 1) #178–181 & Warlock (Vol. 1) #9-11	18 Feb 2015
84	63	Deadpool: Wade Wilson's War	Deadpool: Wade Wilson's War #1–4 and X-Men Origins: Deadpool	4 Mar 2015
85	Classic VI	The Amazing Spider-Man: Spider-Man No More	The Amazing Spider-Man #44–50	18 Mar 2015
86	Classic XXXIII	Warlock (Part 2)	Warlock #12–15, Marvel Team-Up #55, Avengers Annual #7, and Marvel Two-In-One Annual #2.	1 Apr 2015
87	70	Fear Itself (Part 1)	Fear Itself Prologue: Book Of The Skull, Fear Itself #1–3, and Fear Itself: The Worthy One-Shot.	15 Apr 2015
88	Classic XIII	The Mighty Thor: Ragnarok	The Mighty Thor #153–159	29 Apr 2015
89	Classic XXXIX	The Avengers: The Korvac Saga	Thor Annual #6, Avengers #167–168 & 170–177	13 May 2015
90	64	The Thanos Imperative	Guardians of the Galaxy (Vol. 2) #25, The Thanos Imperative: Ignition, The Thanos Imperative #1–6	27 May 2015
91	Classic XXXVIII	Spider-Man: Marvel Team-Up	Marvel Team-Up #59–70	10 Jun 2015
92	Classic XXII	Hulk: Heart of the Atom	The Incredible Hulk #140, #148, #156, #202–203, #205–207, #246–248	24 Jun 2015
93	67	Hulk: Scorched Earth	Hulk (vol. 2) #25–30	8 Jul 2015
94	Classic XXVI	Doctor Strange: A Separate Reality	Marvel Premiere #9–14 and Doctor Strange (vol. 2) #1–5.	22 Jul 2015
95	Classic IX	Nick Fury: Agent of S.H.I.E.L.D. (Part 2)	Strange Tales #163–168 & Nick Fury: Agent of S.H.I.E.L.D. #1–5	5 Aug 2015
96	71	Fear Itself (Part 2)	Fear Itself #4–7 & Fear Itself 7.1: Captain America	19 Aug 2015
97	Classic V	Fantastic Four: Doomsday	Fantastic Four #52–60	2 Sep 2015
98	Classic XIX	The Amazing Spider-Man: Death of the Stacys	Amazing Spider-Man #88–92 & 121–122	16 Sep 2015
99	73	Daredevil: Sound and Fury	Daredevil (Vol. 3) #1–6	30 Sep 2015
100	Classic XXXV	Iron Fist: The Search for Colleen Wing	Marvel Premiere #25 & Iron Fist #1–7	14 Oct 2015
101	Classic XVI	X-Men: In the Shadow of Sauron	X-Men #60–66 and Amazing Adventures #11	28 Oct 2015
102	75	Battle Scars	Battle Scars #1–6	11 Nov 2015
103	Classic XIV	Silver Surfer: Origins	Silver Surfer #1–5	25 Nov 2015
104	Classic XXIII	The Defenders: Day of the Defenders	Marvel Feature #1–3, The Defenders #1–5	9 Dec 2015
105	78	Avengers vs. X-Men (Part 1)	Avengers vs. X-Men #0–4, AVX versus #1–2	23 Dec 2015
106	Classic XVII	The Invincible Iron Man: The Beginning of the End	The Invincible Iron Man #14–23	6 Jan 2016
107	Classic XX	The Avengers: Kree-Skrull War	The Avengers #89–97	20 Jan 2016
108	76	The Amazing Spider-Man: Spider-Island (Part 1)	The Amazing Spider-Man #666–669, Venom #6, and Spider-Island: Deadly Foes	3 Feb 2016
109	Classic X	The Inhumans	Thor #146–152 & Amazing Adventures #1–10	17 Feb 2016
110	Classic XVIII	Marvel Origins: The 70s	Hero for Hire #1, Marvel Premiere #1 & #15–16, Incredible Hulk #181, Captain Britain Weekly #1–2, Marvel Spotlight #5 & #32, Nova #1, and She-Hulk #1	2 Mar 2016
111	79	Avengers vs. X-Men (Part 2)	Avengers Vs. X-Men #5–8 and AVX Versus #3–4	16 Mar 2016
112	Classic XXVII	Avengers: Defenders War	Avengers #115–118 and Defenders #8–11	30 Mar 2016
113	Classic XXXI	Deathlok: Origins	Astonishing Tales #25–28, 30–36 and Marvel Spotlight #33	13 Apr 2016
114	74	Ultimate Comics Spider-Man: Who is Miles Morales?	Ultimate Comics Fallout #4 & Ultimate Comics Spider-Man #1–5	27 Apr 2016
115	Classic XXI	Marvel Horror	Ghost Rider #1–2, Marvel Spotlight #2, #11–12, Savage Tales #1, Tomb of Dracula #1, Monster of Frankenstein #1, Supernatural Thrillers #5, Strange Tales #169	11 May 2016
116	Classic XXVIII	Black Panther: Panther's Rage	Jungle Action #6–18	25 May 2016
117	77	The Amazing Spider-Man: Spider-Island (Part 2)	Amazing Spider-Man #670–673 and Venom #7–8	8 Jun 2016
118	Classic XXXVI	Captain America and The Falcon: Madbomb	Captain America and the Falcon #193–200	22 Jun 2016
119	Classic XXXVII	Marvel What If?	What If? (Vol. 1) #1, 3, 18, 20, 23–24 & excerpts from #34	6 Jul 2016
120	80	Avengers vs. X-Men (Part 3)	Avengers Vs. X-Men #9–12 and AVX Versus #5–6	20 Jul 2016
121	90	Guardians of the Galaxy: Cosmic Avengers	Guardians of the Galaxy: Tomorrows Avengers #1 and Guardians of the Galaxy (Vol. 3) #0.1 & 1–3	3 Aug 2016
122	82	Uncanny Avengers: The Red Shadow	Uncanny Avengers #1–5	17 Aug 2016
123	81	Hawkeye: My Life as a Weapon	Hawkeye (Vol. 4) #1–5 and Young Avengers Presents #6	31 Aug 2016
124	97	All-New Ghost Rider: Engines of Vengeance	All-New Ghost Rider #1–5	14 Sep 2016
125	86	Avengers: Avengers World	Avengers (Vol. 5) #1–6	28 Sep 2016
126	96	Silver Surfer: New Dawn	Silver Surfer (Vol. 7) #1–5, "Girl on Board" from All-New Marvel Point One	12 Oct 2016
127	91	Nova: Origin	Nova (Vol. 5) #1–5, "Diamondhead" from Marvel Now! Point One.	26 Oct 2016
128	88	New Avengers: Everything Dies	New Avengers (Vol. 3) #1–6	9 Nov 2016
129	89	Superior Spider-Man: My Own Worst Enemy	Amazing Spider-Man #698–700, Superior Spider-Man #1–5	23 Nov 2016
130	85	Thor: God of Thunder – The God Butcher	Thor God of Thunder #1–5	7 Dec 2016
131	92	Infinity (Part 1)	Infinity #1–3, Avengers (Vol. 5) #18–20, New Avengers (Vol. 3) #9–10	21 Dec 2016
132	84	Captain America: Castaway in Dimension Z	Captain America (Vol. 7) #1–10	4 Jan 2017
133	93	Infinity (Part 2)	Infinity #4–6, Avengers (Vol. 5) #21–23, New Avengers (Vol. 3) #11–12	18 Jan 2017
134	83	Fantastic Four: Voyagers	Fantastic Four (Vol. 4) #1–8	1 Feb 2017
135	87	Young Avengers: Style > Substance	Young Avengers (Vol. 2) #1–5	15 Feb 2017
136	100	Death of Wolverine	Death of Wolverine #1–4	1 Mar 2017
137	98	Original Sin (Part 1)	Original Sin #0–3, Original Sins #1–3	15 Mar 2017
138	95	Ms. Marvel: No Normal	Ms. Marvel (Vol. 3) #1–5 and "Garden State of Mind" from All-New Marvel Now! Point One	29 Mar 2017
139	94	Avengers Arena: Kill or Die	Avengers Arena #1–7	12 Apr 2017
140	99	Original Sin (Part 2)	Original Sin #4–8, Original Sins #4–5, Original Sin: Annual #1	26 Apr 2017
141	108	Rocket Raccoon: A Chasing Tail!	Rocket Raccoon (Vol. 2) #1–6	10 May 2017
142	104	Thor: The Goddess of Thunder	Thor (Vol. 4) #1–5	24 May 2017
143	102	The Amazing Spider-Man: Spider-Verse	Amazing Spider-Man (Vol. 3) #9–15	7 Jun 2017
144	106	Spider-Gwen: Most Wanted	Edge of Spider-Verse #2 and Spider-Gwen (Vol. 1) #1–5	21 Jun 2017
145	101	Deadpool's Secret Secret Wars	Deadpool's Secret Secret Wars #1–4	5 Jul 2017
146	103	Time Runs Out (Part 1)	Avengers (Vol. 5) #35–38, New Avengers (Vol. 3) #24–27	19 Jul 2017
147	105	Time Runs Out (Part 2)	Avengers (Vol. 5) #39–41, New Avengers (Vol. 3) #28–30	2 Aug 2017
148	107	Time Runs Out (Part 3)	Avengers (Vol. 5) #42–44, New Avengers (Vol. 3) #31–33	16 Aug 2017
149	109	Secret Wars (Part 1)	Secret Wars #0–4 and Secret Wars Journal #1–2	30 Aug 2017
150	110	Secret Wars (Part 2)	Secret Wars #5–9 and Secret Wars Journal #3–5	13 Sep 2017
151	111	Civil War: Warzones	Civil War (Vol. 2) #1–5	27 Sep 2017
152	118	The Ultimates Omniversal (AKA Start With the Impossible)	Material from All-New All-Different Avengers #0 & The Ultimates (Vol. 3) #1–6	11 Oct 2017
153	115	Doctor Strange: The Way of the Weird	Doctor Strange (Vol. 4) #1–5	25 Oct 2017
154	113	Karnak: The Flaw in all Things	Karnak #1–6	8 Nov 2017
155	116	Vision: Little Worse Than A Man	The Vision (Vol. 2) #1–6	22 Nov 2017
156	119	All New, All Different Avengers: The Magnificent Seven	All-New, All-Different Avengers #1–6 and material from Avengers #0 & FCBD 2015: Avengers	6 Dec 2017
157	114	Unbeatable Squirrel Girl: Squirrel, You Really Got Me Now	The Unbeatable Squirrel Girl (Vol. 2) #1–6	20 Dec 2017
158	112	Spider-Gwen: Greater Power	Spider-Gwen (Vol. 2) #1–6	3 Jan 2018
159	117	Vision: Little Better Than A Beast	The Vision (Vol. 2) #7–12	17 Jan 2018
160	120	The Mighty Thor: Thunder in Her Veins	Mighty Thor (Vol. 2) #1–5	31 Jan 2018
161	125	Spider-Man/Deadpool: Isn't it Bromantic	Spider-Man/Deadpool #1–5 & 8	14 Feb 2018
162	123	All-New Wolverine: The Four Sisters	All-New Wolverine #1–6	28 Feb 2018
163	128	A-Force: Hypertime	A-Force (Vol. 2) #1–7	14 Mar 2018
164	121	Moon Girl and Devil Dinosaur: BFF	Moon Girl and Devil Dinosaur #1–6	28 Mar 2018
165	124	Patsy Walker, AKA. Hellcat: Hooked on a Feline	Patsy Walker, AKA. Hellcat #1–6	11 Apr 2018
166	126	Avengers: Standoff (Part 1)	Avengers Standoff: Welcome to Pleasant Hill, Avengers Standoff: Assault on Pleasant Hill Alpha, Agents of S.H.I.E.L.D. #3–4, New Avengers (vol. 4) #8–10, Uncanny Avengers (Vol. 3) #7	25 Apr 2018
167	122	Spider-Woman: Shifting Gears	Spider-Woman (Vol. 6) #1–5	9 May 2018
168	129	Black Widow: S.H.I.E.L.D.'s Most Wanted	Black Widow (Vol. 6) #1–6	23 May 2018
169	130	Black Panther: A Nation Under Our Feet Part 1	Black Panther (Vol. 6) #1–6	6 Jun 2018
170	127	Avengers: Standoff (Part 2)	All-New, All-Different Avengers #7–8, Uncanny Avengers Vol. 3 #8, Howling Commandos of S.H.I.E.L.D. #6, Illuminati #6, Captain America: Sam Wilson #7–8, and Avengers Standoff: Assault on Pleasant Hill Omega	20 Jun 2018
171	131	Black Panther: A Nation Under Our Feet Part 2	Black Panther (Vol. 6) #7–12	4 Jul 2018
172	150	The Infinity Saga Part 1	The Infinity Gauntlet #1–6	18 Jul 2018
173	141	Punisher: On The Road	Punisher (Vol. 10) #1–6	1 Aug 2018
174	151	The Infinity Saga Part 2	The Infinity War #1–3, Warlock and the Infinity Watch #7 and Marvel Comics Presents (vol. 2) #108–111	15 Aug 2018
175	136	Doctor Strange: The Last Days of Magic	Doctor Strange (Vol. 4) #6–10, Doctor Strange: The Last Days of Magic	29 Aug 2018
176	152	The Infinity Saga Part 3	The Infinity War #4–6, Warlock and the Infinity Watch #8–10	12 Sep 2018
177	133	Old Man Logan: Berserker	Old Man Logan (Vol. 2) #1–7	26 Sep 2018
178	153	The Infinity Saga Part 4	The Infinity Crusade #1–3, Warlock Chronicles #3 and Warlock and the Infinity Watch #20	10 Oct 2018
179	135	Spider-Women	Spider-Women Alpha, Silk (Vol. 2) 7–8, Spider-Gwen (Vol. 2) 7–8, Spider-Woman (Vol. 6) 6–7, Spider-Women Omega	24 Oct 2018
180	154	The Infinity Saga Part 5	The Infinity Crusade #4–6 and The Warlock Chronicles #4–5	07 Nov 2018
181	145	Dr Strange: Blood In The Aether	Doctor Strange (Vol. 4) #11–16	21 Nov 2018
182	147	Avengers: Galactic Storm Part 1	Captain America #398–399, Avengers West Coast #80–81, Quasar #32, Wonder Man #7, Avengers #345, Iron Man #278 and Thor #445	05 Dec 2018
183	132	Daredevil: Chinatown	Daredevil (Vol. 5) #1–5, excerpt from All-New, All-Different Point One	19 Dec 2018
184	148	Avengers: Galactic Storm Part 2	Quasar #33–34, Wonder Man #8, Avengers #346, Iron Man #279, Thor #446, Captain America #400, Avengers: West Coast #82	02 Jan 2019
185	142	Deadpool V Gambit: The "V" is for "Vs."	Deadpool V Gambit #1–5	16 Jan 2019
186	149	Avengers: Galactic Storm Part 3	Wonder Man #9, Avengers #347, Captain America #401, Quasar #35–36, What If? (Vol. 2) #55–56	30 Jan 2019
187	138	Captain America, Steve Rogers: Hail Hydra	Captain America: Steve Rogers #1–6, excerpt from FCBD 2016 Captain America	13 Feb 2019
188	159	Earth X Saga Part 1	Earth X #0–6	27 Feb 2019
189	134	Old Man Logan: The Last Ronin	Old Man Logan (Vol. 2) #8–13	13 Mar 2019
190	160	Earth X Saga Part 2	Earth X #7–12 & X	27 Mar 2019
191	139	Civil War II Part 1	Civil War II #0–4, Free Comic Book Day 2016: Civil War II, Civil War II: The Accused	10 Apr 2019
192	155	Onslaught Part 1	X-Men (Vol. 2) #53–54, Uncanny X-Men (Vol. 1) #334–335, X-Men: Onslaught, Avengers (Vol. 1) #401 and Fantastic Four (Vol. 1) #415	24 Apr 2019
193	137	Moon Knight: Lunatic	Moon Knight (vol. 8) #1–5	8 May 2019
194	156	Onslaught Part 2	Cable (Vol. 1) #34, Incredible Hulk (Vol. 1) #444, Wolverine (Vol. 2) #104, X-Factor (Vol. 1) #125–126, Amazing Spider-Man (Vol. 1) #415, Green Goblin #12, Spider-Man (Vol. 1) #72, and material from Excalibur (vol. 1) #100 and Sensational Spider-Man (Vol. 1) #8	22 May 2019
195	140	Civil War II Part 2	Civil War II: The Fallen, Civil War II #5–8, Civil War II: The Oath	5 June 2019
196	157	Onslaught Part 3	X-Man #18–19, X-Force (vol. 1) #57–58, Punisher (vol. 3) #11, X-Men (vol. 2) #55, Uncanny X-Men (vol. 1) #336, Cable (vol. 1) #35 & Incredible Hulk (vol. 1) #445	19 Jun 2019
197	143	The Champions: Change the World	Champions (vol. 2) #1–5	3 July 2019
198	158	Onslaught Part 4	Iron Man (vol. 1) #332, Avengers (vol. 1) #402, Thor (vol. 1) #502, Wolverine (vol. 2) #105, Fantastic Four (vol. 1) #416, X-Men (vol. 2) #56, Onslaught: Marvel Universe	17 Jul 2019
199	144	Jessica Jones: Uncaged!	Jessica Jones (vol. 2) #1–6	31 Jul 2019
200	146	Dr Strange: Mr Misery	Doctor Strange (vol. 4) #17–20 and Annual	14 Aug 2019
201	170	New Avengers: Illuminati	New Avengers: Illuminati – Road to Civil War #1, New Avengers: Illuminati #1–5	28 Aug 2019
202	177	Marvel Masters: Chris Claremont	Daredevil (vol. 1) #102, Iron Fist (vol. 1) #14, Ms Marvel (vol. 1) #19, Avengers (vol. 1) Annual #10, Uncanny X-Men (vol. 1) #161, Marvel Graphic Novel #5 and X-Men Black: Magneto #1	11 Sep 2019
203	161	Maximum Security Part 1	Maximum Security: Dangerous Planet #1, Iron Man (vol. 3) #35, Captain America (vol. 3) #36, Maximum Security #1, Thor (vol. 2) #30, Uncanny X-Men #387 and Bishop #15	25 Sep 2019
204	175	Marvel Masters: Jack Kirby	Red Raven Comics #1, Marvel Mystery Comics #13, Capitan America Comics #1, Amazing Spider-Man (vol. 1) #8, Thor (vol. 1) #160–161, Black Panther (vol. 1) #1–3, The Eternals (vol. 1) #7, Devil Dinosaur #1	9 Oct 2019
205	162	Maximum Security Part 2	Iron Man (vol. 3) #35, Maximum Security #2–3, The Avengers (vol. 3) #35, Gambit #23, X-Men #107 and X-Men Unlimited #29	23 Oct 2019
206	179	Marvel Masters: Frank Miller	John Carter, Warlord of Mars #18, Peter Parker, The Spectacular Spider-Man #27–28, Marvel Two-in-One #51, Daredevil #168, #181, #190–191, Bizarre Adventures #28 and Marvel Fanfare #18	6 Nov 2019
207	166	Annihilation Part 1	Drax the Destroyer #1–4, Annihilation: Prologue and Annihilation: Nova #1–4	20 Nov 2019
208	180	Marvel Masters: Jim Lee	Solo Avengers #1, Daredevil Annual #5, Punisher: War Journal #6–7, Uncanny X-Men #248 & #268, Classic X-Men #39, X-Men Vol.2 #1 and Fantastic Four Vol.2 #1	4 Dec 2019
209	167	Annihilation Part 2	Annihilation: Silver Surfer #1–4 and Annihilation: Super-Skrull #1–4	18 Dec 2019
210	178	Marvel Masters: Bill Sienkiewicz	Hulk #13–14, Marvel Preview #18, Moon Knight #22–23 & #26, New Mutants #18–20, The Sentry/Hulk #1	1 Jan 2020
211	168	Annihilation Part 3	Annihilation: Ronan #1-4 and Annihilation #1-3	15 Jan 2020
212	173	The Knights Of Pendragon: Once and Future	The Knights Of Pendragon #1-9	29 Jan 2020
213	169	Annihilation Part 4	Annihilation #4-6, Annihilation: Heralds of Galactus #1-2 and What if? Annihilation #1	12 Feb 2020
214	171	Dragon's Claws	Dragon's Claws #1-10	26 Feb 2020
215	163	The Avengers: The Kang Dynasty Part 1	The Avengers Vol. 3 #41-47 and The Avengers Annual 2001	11 Mar 2020
216	176	Marvel Masters: Steve Ditko	Journey into Mystery #33, Amazing Adult Fantasy #9, Strange Tales #126-127, The Amazing Spider-Man #30-33, Machine Man #10, Speedball #1, Marvel Super Heroes #8 and The Incredible Hulk & Human Torch #1	25 Mar 2020
217	172	Death's Head	Death's Head #1-7 and material from Marvel Heroes #33	8 Apr 2020
218	164	The Avengers: The Kang Dynasty Part 2	The Avengers Vol. 3 #48-55	6 May 2020
219	174	Marvel Masters: Stan Lee	The Amazing Spider-Man #39-40, Daredevil #47, Fantastic Four Annual #6, Marvel Premiere #3, Silver Surfer: Parable #1-2, and including material from Captain America Comics #3, Menace #3, Amazing Adult Fantasy #11, The Amazing Spider-Man Annual #5 and Stan Lee Meets Spider-Man	27 May 2020
220	165	Marvel Universe: The End	Marvel: The End #1-6	10 Jun 2020
221	183	Secret Empire Part One	Secret Empire #0-5 and Free Comic Book Day 2017 (Secret Empire) #1	24 Jun 2020
222	182	Hawkeye: Anchor Points	Hawkeye #1-6	8 Jul 2020
223	189	Venom: Lethal Protector	Venom #150-158	22 Jul 2020
224	187	Black Bolt: Hard Time	Black Bolt #1-6	05 Aug 2020
225	185	All-New Guardians Of The Galaxy : Communication Breakdown	Free Comic Book Day 2017 (All-New Guardians of the Galaxy) and All-New Guardians of the Galaxy #1-2, 4, 6, 8 and 10	19 Aug 2020
226	184	Secret Empire Part Two	Secret Empire #6-10 and Secret Empire Omega #1	2 Sep 2020
227	186	All-New Guardians Of The Galaxy: Riders In The Sky	All-New Guardians of the Galaxy #3, 5, 7, 9, 11-12	19 Sep 2020
228	188	Black Bolt: Home Free	Black Bolt #7-12	30 Sep 2020
229	181	Silver Surfer: A Power Greater Than Cosmic	Silver Surfer (vol. 8) #7-14	14 Oct 2020
230	190	Defenders: Diamonds Are Forever	Defenders (vol. 5) #1-5	28 Oct 2020
231	192	Peter Parker: The Spectacular Spider-Man: Into The Twilight	Peter Parker: The Spectacular Spider-Man (vol. 2) #1-6, Free Comic Book Day 2017 (Secret Empire) #1	11 Nov 2020
232	196	Generations Part One	Generations: Banner Hulk & The Totally Awesome Hulk, Generations: Captain Marvel & Captain Mar-Vell, Generations: Ms. Marvel & Ms. Marvel, Generations: Hawkeye & Hakweye, Generations: Iron Man & Ironheart	25 Nov 2020
233	198	The Despicable Deadpool: Deadpool Kills Cable	The Despicable Deadpool #287-293	9 Dec 2020
234	191	Iceman: Thawing Out	Iceman (vol. 3) #1-8	23 Dec 2020
235	197	Generations Part 2	Generations: Phoenix & Jean Grey, Generations: Wolverine & All-New Wolverine, Generations: The Unworthy Thor & Mighty Thor, Generations: Miles Morales Spider-Man & Peter Parker Spider-Man, Generations: Sam Wilson Captain America & Steve Rogers Captain America	6 Jan 2021
236	200	The Mighty Thor: The Death Of The Mighty Thor	Mighty Thor (vol. 1) #700-706, Mighty Thor: At the Gates of Valhalla	20 Jan 2021
237	199	The Despicable Deadpool: The Marvel Universe Kills Deadpool	Despicable Deadpool #294-300	3 Feb 2021
238	194	Astonishing X-Men: Life Of X	Astonishing X-Men (Volume 4) #1-6	17 Feb 2021
239	193	Peter Parker: The Spectacular Spider-Man: Amazing Fantasy	Peter Parker: The Spectacular Spider-Man #297-303 and Annual #1	3 March 2021
240	195	Astonishing X-Men: A Man Called X	Astonishing X-Men #7-12	17 March 2021
241	206	Old Man Hawkeye: An Eye For An Eye	Old Man Hawkeye #1-6	31 March 2021
242	204	Avengers: No Surrender Part One	Avengers #675-682	14 April 2021
243	202	Phoenix Resurrection: The Return of Jean Grey	Phoenix Resurrection: The Return of Jean Grey #1-5	28 April 2021
244	207	Old Man Hawkeye: The Whole World Blind	Old Man Hawkeye #7-12	12 May 2021
245	208	X-Men Red: The Hate Machine	X-Men: Red #1-5 and Annual #1	26 May 2021
246	203	The Amazing Spider-Man: Red Goblin	Amazing Spider-Man #794-801	9 June 2021
247	205	Avengers: No Surrender Part Two	Avengers #683-690	23 June 2021
248	209	X-Men Gold: 'til Death Do Us Part	X-Men Gold (2017) #26-30, X-Men: The Wedding Special #1	7 July 2021
249	210	Deadpool: You Are Deadpool	You Are Deadpool #1-5	21 July 2021
250	201	Thanos: Thanos Wins	Thanos #13-18 and Thanos Annual #1	4 August 2021
251	216	Hulk: Future Imperfect	The Incredible Hulk: Future Imperfect #1-2 and Hulk: The End	15 September 2021
252	219	Young Avengers: Sidekicks	Young Avengers (2005) #1-6	29 September 2021
253	213	West Coast Avengers: Vision Quest	West Coast Avengers #42-46 and Avengers West Coast #47-50	13 October 2021
254	211	X-Men: Mutant Massacre Part One	Uncanny X-Men #210-211, X-Factor #9-10, New Mutants #46, The Mighty Thor #373 & Power Pack #27	27 October 2021
255	217	Maximum Carnage Part One	Spider-Man Unlimited #1, Web of Spider-Man #101-102 The Amazing Spider-Man #378-379, Spider-Man # 35 & Spectacular Spider-Man #201	10 November 2021
256	220	Young Avengers: Family Matters	Young Avengers #7-12 and Young Avengers Special #1	24 November 2021
257	215	Doctor Strange and Doctor Doom: Triumph and Torment	Doctor Strange and Doctor Doom: Triumph and Torment, Doctor Strange #57, Astonishing Tales #8 and Marvel Fanfare #16 & 43	8 December 2021
258	212	X-Men: Mutant Massacre Part Two	The Mighty Thor #374, The Uncanny X-Men #212–214, X-Factor #11 & Daredevil #238	22 December 2021
259	218	Maximum Carnage Part Two	Spider-Man # 36–37, Spectacular Spider-Man #202-203, Web of Spider-Man #103, The Amazing Spider-Man #380 and Spider-Man Unlimited #2	5 January 2022
260	214	Avengers West Coast: Darker than Scarlet	Avengers West Coast #51-57 & 60-62	19 January 2022
261	223	The Immortal Hulk: Or Is He Both?	The Immortal Hulk #1-8	2 February 2022
262	225	X-Men Red: Waging Peace	X-Men Red #6-11	16 February 2022
263	221	Venom: Rex	Venom #1-6	2 March 2022
264	222	Avengers: The Final Host	Free Comic Book Day Avengers 2018 #1 & Avengers (2018) #1-6	16 March 2022
265	226	Captain America: Winter in America	Free Comic Book Day Avengers 2018 #1 and Captain America (vol. 9) #1-6	30 March 2022
266	228	Infinity Countdown	Infinity Countdown: Adam Warlock #1, Infinity Countdown: Prime #1 and Infinity Countdown #1-5	13 April 2022
267	224	Thor God of Thunder: Reborn	Thor #1-6	27 April 2022
268	227	The Amazing Spider-Man: Back to Basics	Free Comic Book day 2018 The Amazing Spider-Man and The Amazing Spider-Man volume 5 #1-5	11 May 2022
269	229	Infinity Wars Part One	Infinity Wars Prime, Infinity Wars #1-3 and material from Thanos Legacy #1	25 May 2022
270	230	Infinity Wars Part Two	Infinity Wars #4-6, Infinity Wars: Fallen Guardian and Infinity Wars: Infinity	8 June 2022
271	231	Fantastic Four: Fourever	Fantastic Four (volume 6) #1-5 and Fantastic Four: The Wedding Special	22 June 2022
272	234	Return of Wolverine	Return of Wolverine #1-5	6 July 2022
273	239	Black Panther Vs. Deadpool	Black Panther Vs. Deadpool #1-5	20 July 2022
274	232	X-Men Extermination	X-Men Extermination #1-5 and material from X-Men Gold (volume 2) #27, X-Men Blue #27, X-Men Red #5, Astonishing X-Men #13 (Volume 4) and Cable #159	3 August 2022
275	235	Spider-Geddon	Spider-Geddon #0-5 and Vault of Spiders #1-2	17 August 2022
276	236	Cosmic Ghost-Rider: Baby Thanos	Cosmic Ghost Rider #1-5 and material from Thanos Legacy #1	31 August 2022
277	240	The Immortal Hulk: Hulk in Hell	The Immortal Hulk #9-15	14 September 2022
278	237	Asgardians of the Galaxy: Infinity Armada	Asgardians of the Galaxy #1-7	28 September 2022
279	233	Avengers West Coast: Best Coast	Avengers West Coast volume 3 #1-7	12 October 2022
280	238	Venom: The Abyss	Venom #7-12	26 October 2022

=== International exclusives ===
The following books were only released in Ireland, Czech Republic, Poland, Germany, Brazil, Russia, France, Perú, Argentina, Greece, Hungary and Bulgaria.

Title	Collecting	Released in	Release date
Captain America: Winter Soldier (Part 1)	Captain America (Vol. 5) #1–7	Argentina, Brazil, Bulgaria, Czech Republic, Germany*, Greece, Hungary, Ireland, Perú, Poland, Russia	20 Mar 2013
Avengers: Standoff	Avengers (Vol. 3) #61–63 & #76, The Mighty Thor (Vol. 2) #58, The Invincible Iron Man (Vol. 3) #64	Argentina, Bulgaria, Czech Republic, Hungary, Ireland, Perú, Poland, Russia	April 29, 2013
Deadpool: Hey, it's Deadpool!	Deadpool (Vol. 1) #1–5 & -1	Germany, Russia	July 17, 2013
Iron Man: The Five Nightmares	The Invincible Iron Man (Vol. 5) #1–7	Argentina, Bulgaria, Czech Republic, Hungary, Ireland, Perú, Poland, Russia	July 31, 2013
Uncanny X-Men: Days of Future Past	Uncanny X-Men #138–143 and Uncanny X-Men Annual #4	Argentina, France, Perú, Poland, Russia	May 23, 2014
Astonishing Thor	Astonishing Thor (Vol. 1) #1–5	Argentina, Brazil, Bulgaria, Czech Republic, Ireland, Perú, Poland, Russia	December 3, 2014
Marvel Knights Spider-Man: Down Among the Dead Men	Marvel Knights: Spider-Man #1–4	Czech Republic, France, Germany, Greece, Poland, Russia, Bulgaria	December 17, 2014
Marvel Knights Spider-Man: Venomous	Marvel Knights: Spider-Man #5–8	Czech Republic, France, Germany, Greece, Poland, Russia, Bulgaria	January 28, 2015
The Infinity Gauntlet	Infinity Gauntlet (Vol. 1) #1–6	France, Canada, Russia	February 13, 2015
Deadpool: Suicide Kings	Deadpool: Suicide Kings #1–5	France,Canada, Germany, Russia	March 3, 2015
Punisher: Circle of Blood	Punisher #1–5	Germany, Poland, Russia	February 11, 2015
Deadpool: Team-Ups and Downs	Deadpool Team-Up 899–893	Germany, Poland, Russia	June 3, 2015
Deadpool: Killer, Gods and Vampires	Deadpool Team-Up 892–886	Argentina, Germany, Poland, Russia	September 23, 2015
Fearless	Fear Itself: The Fearless #1–6	Argentina, Brazil, Russia	September 6, 2017
Fearless (Part 2)	Fear Itself: The Fearless #7–12	Argentina, Brazil, Russia	October 18, 2017
Annihilators	Annihilators #1–4	Argentina, Brazil, Poland, Russia, Perú	November 29, 2017
Hulk: Asunder	Incredible Hulk (Vol. 3) #1–7	Argentina, Brazil, Poland, Russia	January 10, 2018
Wolverine & the X-Men: Regenesis	Wolverine & the X-Men (Vol. 1) # 1–7	Argentina, Brazil, Poland, Perú	March 21, 2018
Avengers Assemble	Avengers Assemble #1–8	Brazil, Poland, Russia, Argentina	April 20, 2018
Defenders: Breaker of Worlds	Defenders (Vol.4) #1–6	Brazil, Poland, Argentina	May 23, 2018
Avengers: End Times	Avengers (Vol.4) #31–34, New Avengers #31–34	Brazil, Poland, Russia, Argentina	August 22, 2018
AvX: Consequences	AvX: Consequences #1–5	Brazil, Russia, Argentina	January 25, 2019

In Germany Astonishing X-Men: Gifted and Fear Itself (Part 1) were released with different covers.

In Brazil Venom was released with a different cover.

"Winter Soldier (Part 1)" was released in Germany with a picture, which was in other countries used for "Winter Soldier (Part 2)", on the cover.

== International variants ==
In Poland, the collection was titled Wielka Kolekcja Komiksów Marvela (The Great Marvel Comics Collection) and was published in 170 issues from August 2012 to May 2019.

The same collection is being published in the Czech Republic and Slovakia from January 2013 as Ultimátní komiksový komplet (The Ultimate Comics Collection), with 199 KČ / 9.99 EUR per book from issue 3 onwards. The price increased to 219 KČ / 9.99 EUR per book from issue 38 onwards and then to 249 KČ / 9.99 EUR per book from issue 56 onwards. The books (at least according to first 4 books) come in slightly different order than the one in table above. The books are sold in Czech republic first and after 4 months the unsold books are distributed in Slovakia. The collection continues with issues 61–120, none of the books is marked as Classic. In November 2015, test run of Nejmocnější hrdinové Marvelu (Marvel's Mightiest Heroes) was launched.

The collection debuted in Germany under the title Die offizielle Marvel-Comic-Sammlung (The Official Marvel Comic Collection) in January 2013.

In September 2013, after an initial test run, the collection was made available in Brazil by Editora Salvat as A Coleção Oficial de Graphic Novels Marvel (The Official Marvel Graphic Novel Collection), priced at R$29,90 from issue 3 onwards.

In Russia the series was launched in January 2014, under the title Marvel. Официальная коллекция комиксов (Marvel. Ofitsialnaya kollektsiya komiksov — Marvel. The Official Comics Collection). The collection is issued by the Russian branch of the Hachette in cooperation with the Panini Comics providing translation and page layout.

In March 2014 the collection started in France and Canada under the title Marvel Comics: La Collection de Référence

In Argentina, the collection started May 2014 under the title Colección Definitiva de Novelas Gráficas de Marvel. The same edition began to be sold in Peru beginning in September 2015.

In March 2016 a test run of four titles was launched in Romania under the title Colecţia Oficială de Romane Grafice Marvel but it wasn't picked up for a full run.

In Hungary, the collection started under the title Nagy Marvel Képregénygyűjtemény in January 2018.

In September 2019 the collection started in Greece under the title Η Επίσημη Συλλογή Graphic Novels της Marvel.

In September 2020 the collection started in Bulgaria under the title Върховна колекция графични романи Марвел.

== Marvel's Mightiest Heroes ==
The second series from Hachette Partworks began in January 2013, with each issue focussing on a different heroic Marvel character. This time the books built up a panoramic picture on the spine by artist Marko Djurdjević. The format featured a relatively recent story as the volume's main feature story (billed first on the front cover), preceded by the first appearance story and in some cases another early appearance (e.g. Hawkeye's first appearance as a solo character plus his first appearance with The Avengers). Although the first four titles were announced, only three were published and subscribers were told the series had been postponed. However, the series was relaunched in January 2014 beginning with the same four issues, but this time the books built up a panoramic picture on the spine by artist Adi Granov. This means collectors who had purchased the original three volumes would have to purchase them again to complete the spine art.

The series was extended for an additional forty issues.

The series ended on 12 December 2018 after a total of 130 books.

=== List of books ===
Issue	Volume	Title	Main Feature Story	First/Early Appearance Story/Stories	Release date
1	24	The Avengers	Ultron Unlimited (Avengers (Vol. 3) #0 and #19–22)	The Coming Of The Avengers (Avengers Vol 1 #1)	27 Dec 2013
2	12	Spider-Man	Happy Birthday (Amazing Spider-Man (Vol. 2) #57–58 and (Vol. 1) #500–502).	Spider-Man (Amazing Fantasy #15); The Sinister Six (Amazing Spider-Man Annual #1)	15 Jan 2014
3	55	Wolverine	Get Mystique (Wolverine (Vol. 3) #62–65)	And Now... The Wolverine (Incredible Hulk #181)	29 Jan 2014
4	29	Hawkeye	Hawkeye (Hawkeye (Vol. 1) #1–4).	Hawkeye, The Marksman (Tales of Suspense #57); The Old Order Changeth! (The Avengers Vol 1 #16)	12 Feb 2014
5	10	The Hulk	Dogs Of War (The Incredible Hulk (Vol. 2) #12–20)	None	26 Feb 2014
6	22	Jean Grey	Here Comes Yesterday (All-New X-Men #1–5)	X-Men Origins: Jean Grey	12 Mar 2014
7	49	Power Man	New Avengers: Luke Cage #1–3	Power Man and Iron Fist #50–53	26 Mar 2014
8	3	Captain America	War and Remembrance (Captain America #247–255)	None	9 Apr 2014
9	13	Iron Man	The Five Nightmares (The Invincible Iron Man (Vol. 5) #1–7)	Iron Man is Born (Tales of Suspense #39)	23 Apr 2014
10	17	The X-Men	X-Men: Children of the Atom #1–6	X-Men (Vol. 1) #1	7 May 2014
11	27	Black Widow	Homecoming (Black Widow #1–6)	The Crimson Dynamo Strikes (Tales of Suspense #52); Beware the Black Widow (The Amazing Spider-Man #86)	21 May 2014
12	2	The Human Torch (Jim Hammond)	The Torch (The Torch #1–8)	None	4 June 2014
13	32	The Warriors Three	Dog Day Afternoon (Warriors Three #1–4)	Marvel Fanfare #34–37	18 June 2014
14	20	Cyclops	Cyclops: Odyssey (Marvel Icons: Cyclops #1–4)	X-Men Origins: Cyclops #1	2 July 2014
15	38	Captain Marvel	Captain Marvel (Vol. 1) #17–23	Marvel Spotlight On Captain Marvel #1–2	16 July 2014
16	57	The Uncanny X-Men	God Loves, Man Kills (Marvel Graphic Novel #5)	Days of Future Past (Uncanny X-Men #138–142)	30 July 2014
17	6	The Invisible Woman	Fantastic Four (Vol. 1) #280–284	None	13 Aug 2014
18	42	The Vision	Avengers Icons: Vision #1–4	Behold... The Vision (Avengers #57–58)	27 Aug 2014
19	43	Guardians Of The Galaxy	Legacy (Guardians of the Galaxy (Vol. 2) #1–6)	Thunder in the 31st Century (Thor Annual #6)	10 Sep 2014
20	45	The Falcon	The Falcon #1–4	The Coming of the Falcon (Captain America #117–119)	24 Sep 2014
21	1	Namor: The Sub-Mariner	Namor The Sub-Mariner (Vol. 1) #1–9	None	8 Oct 2014
22	23	Professor X	The Muir Island Saga (Uncanny X-Men #278–280 & X-Factor #69–70)	Psi-War! (Uncanny X-Men #117)	22 Oct 2014
23	40	Carol Danvers/Ms. Marvel/Captain Marvel	In Pursuit of Flight (Captain Marvel (Vol. 7) #1–6)	Ms. Marvel (Vol. 1) #1–3	5 Nov 2014
24	46	Valkyrie	Doom Maidens (Fearless Defenders (Vol. 1) #1–6)	None	19 Nov 2014
25	53	The Punisher	Punisher: Circle of Blood #1–5	The Punisher Strikes Twice! (The Amazing Spider-Man #129)	3 Dec 2014
26	14	Nick Fury	Nick Fury, Agent of Nothing (Secret Warriors #1–6)	Seven Against the Nazis (Sgt. Fury & His Howling Commandos #1)	17 Dec 2014
27	35	Black Panther	See Wakanda and Die (Black Panther (Vol. 4) #39–41)	Fantastic Four #52–53	31 Dec 2014
28	56	Madrox: The Multiple Man	Multiple Choice (Madrox (Vol. 1) #1–5)	Madrox the Multiple Man (Giant Size Fantastic Four #4)	14 Jan 2015
29	47	Mockingbird	New Avengers: The Reunion #1–4	...And No Birds Sing! (Marvel Team-Up (Vol. 1) #95)	28 Jan 2015
30	48	The Defenders	Indefensible (The Defenders (Vol. 3) #1–5)	None	11 Feb 2015
31	28	Daredevil	Daredevil: The Man Without Fear #1–5	The Origin of Daredevil (Daredevil (Vol. 1) #1)	25 Feb 2015
32	4	Fantastic Four	The Overthrow of Doom (Fantastic Four #192–200)	None	11 Mar 2015
33	16	Doctor Strange	Into the Dark Dimension (Doctor Strange (Vol. 2) #68–74)	Dr. Strange, Master of Black Magic! (Strange Tales #110)	25 Mar 2015
34	8	The Thing	The Pegasus Project (Marvel Two-in-One #53–58, 60)	This Man... This Monster (Fantastic Four #51)	8 Apr 2015
35	44	Havok	X-Men: Emperor Vulcan #1–5	Wanted: Dead or Alive – Cyclops (X-Men #54); The Living Pharaoh (X-Men #55)	22 Apr 2015
36	26	Scarlet Witch	Vision Quest/Darker Than Scarlet (Avengers West Coast #47–52)	The Brotherhood of Evil Mutants (X-Men #4)	6 May 2015
37	18	Angel	Psylocke and Archangel: Crimson Dawn #1–4	The Million Dollar Angel (material from X-Men #54–56)	20 May 2015
38	54	Iron Fist	The Last Iron Fist Story (The Immortal Iron Fist #1–6)	The Fury of Iron Fist (Marvel Premiere #15)	3 Jun 2015
39	25	Quicksilver	Decimation: Son of M #1–6	Avengers Origins: Scarlet Witch & Quicksilver	17 Jun 2015
40	51	Blade	Undead Again (Blade (vol. 5) #1–6)	His Name is ... Blade (Tomb of Dracula #10)	1 Jul 2015
41	33	Inhumans	Secret Invasion: Inhumans #1–4	The Mighty Thor #146-#147	15 Jul 2015
42	19	Beast	Amazing Adventures (vol. 2) #11–16; Beyond the Border Lurks Death (The Incredible Hulk #161)	None	29 Jul 2015
43	11	Thor	Avengers Disassembled: Thor (Thor (vol. 2) #80–85)	The Power of Thor (Journey into Mystery (vol. 1) #83)	12 Aug 2015
44	52	Shang-Chi	Spider-Island: Deadly Hands of Kung-Fu #1–3	Out of the Past (Deadly Hands of Kung-Fu (vol. 2) #1–4)	26 Aug 2015
45	41	Polaris	Not Brand X (All New X-Factor #1–6)	Who Dares Defy... The Demi-Men? (X-Men #49–52)	9 Sep 2015
46	37	Warlock	Warlock and the Infinity Watch #1–6	And Men Shall Call Him... Warlock (Marvel Premiere #1–2)	23 Sep 2015
47	9	Hank Pym	Mighty Avengers: Earth's Mightiest (Mighty Avengers #21–26)	The Man in the Ant Hill! (Tales To Astonish #27); Return of the Ant-Man (Tales to Astonish #35)	7 Oct 2015
48	31	Hercules	Fear Itself: Herc (Herc #1–6)	When Titans Clash... (Journey Into Mystery Annual #1)	21 Oct 2015
49	21	Iceman	Zero Tolerance (X-Men (vol. 2) #66–69)	X-Men Origins: Iceman	4 Nov 2015
50	15	The Wasp	Under Siege (Avengers #271, #273–278)	The Creature from Kosmos (Tales To Astonish #44)	18 Nov 2015
51	50	Ghost Rider	Vicious Cycle (Ghost Rider (vol. 6) #1–7)	Marvel Spotlight #5	2 Dec 2015
52	30	Wonder Man	Avengers Two: Wonder Man & Beast #1–3	The Coming of the... Wonder Man! (Avengers #9); When Avengers Clash... (Avengers #158–160)	16 Dec 2015
53	34	Silver Surfer	The Herald Ordeal (Silver Surfer (vol 3.) #70–75)	Silver Surfer #1	30 Dec 2015
54	36	Banshee	Phalanx Covenant (X-Men (vol. 2) #36–37 & Uncanny X-Men #316–317)	The Wail of the Banshee! (X-Men #28)	13 Jan 2016
55	39	The Black Knight	Captain Britain & MI:13: Vampire State	Magneto Walks the Earth (Avengers #47); The Black Knight Lives Again (Avengers #48)	27 Jan 2016
56	60	Storm	X-Men: Worlds Apart #1–4	Lifedeath (Uncanny X-Men #186, 198)	10 Feb 2016
57	7	The Human Torch (Johnny Storm)	Burn (Human Torch (Vol. 2) #1–6)	None	24 Feb 2016
58	58	Colossus	The Trial of Colossus (Uncanny X-Men #122–124)	A Most Dangerous Game (Colossus #1); X-Men Origins: Colossus #1	9 Mar 2016
59	5	Mr. Fantastic	Sentient (Fantastic Four (Vol. 3) #60-#64)	Fantastic Four #1	23 Mar 2016
60	59	Nightcrawler	The Devil Inside / Ghosts on the Tracks (Nightcrawler (Vol. 3) #1–6)	X-Men Origins: Nightcrawler	6 Apr 2016
61	83	Deadpool	Deadpool: Suicide Kings #1–5	New Mutants #98	20 Apr 2016
62	94	The Winter Soldier	Winter Soldier: The Bitter March #1.NOW-5	Captain America (Vol. 5) #6	4 May 2016
63	87	Generation X	Generation X #1–6	None	18 May 2016
64	92	Jessica Jones	Thin Air (The Pulse #1–5); Happily Ever After (New Avengers Annual #1)	None	1 Jun 2016
65	64	Star-Lord	Annihilation: Conquest – Star-Lord #1–4	Marvel Preview #4, #11	15 Jun 2016
66	71	Scott Lang: Ant-Man	Fantastic Faux (FF (Vol. 2) #1–7)	To Steal an Ant-Man (Marvel Premiere #47); The Price of a Heart (Marvel Premiere #48)	29 Jun 2016
67	85	War Machine	Iron Heart (War Machine (Vol. 2) #1–5)	Iron Man #281–285	13 Jul 2016
68	75	Elektra	Daredevil #174–181	Daredevil #168	27 Jul 2016
69	61	The Invaders	Giant-Size Invaders #1, Invaders (vol. 1) #1–6, and Marvel Premiere #29–30	None	10 Aug 2016
70	89	Spider-Girl	Spider-Girl #1–7	Legacy... in Black and White (What If? (vol. 2) #105)	24 Aug 2016
71	62	Moon Knight	From the Dead (Moon Knight (vol. 5) #1–6)	The Stalker Called Moon Knight (Werewolf by Night #32)	7 Sep 2016
72	65	Rocket Raccoon	Guardian of the Keystone Quadrant (Rocket Raccoon (vol. 1) #1–4)	Now Somewhere In the Black Holes of Sirius Major There Lived a Young Boy Name of Rocket Raccoon! (Incredible Hulk #271); The Sword in the Star!: Stave 2: Witchworld! (Material from Marvel Preview #7)	21 Sep 2016
73	79	West Coast Avengers	Ultron Unbound (Avengers: West Coast #89–91)	West Coast Avengers: Assemble (West Coast Avengers #1–4)	5 Oct 2016
74	96	Red Hulk	World War Hulks (Hulk (vol. 2) #22–24); Hulk of Arabia (Hulk (vol. 2) #42–46)	None	19 Oct 2016
75	93	Runaways	Pride & Joy (Runaways #1–6)	None	2 Nov 2016
76	66	Captain Britain	Secret Invasion (Captain Britain & MI-13 #1–4)	From the Holocaust... A Hero! (Captain Britain #1–2); Introducing Captain Britain! (Marvel Team-Up #65); Murder World (Marvel Team-Up #66)	16 Nov 2016
77	91	The Sentry	Sentry #1–5, Sentry: Fantastic Four, Sentry: Spider-Man, Sentry: Hulk, Sentry: X-Men, and Sentry: The Void	None	30 Nov 2016
78	98	Avengers Academy	Permanent Record (Avengers Academy #1–6)	Admissions (material from Enter The Heroic Age #1)	14 Dec 2016
79	67	Nova	Annihilation: Nova #1–4	Nova (Vol. 1) #1–4	28 Dec 2016
80	81	Great Lakes Avengers	G.L.A. (Vol. 1) #1–4	Franchise (West Coast Avengers (Vol. 2) #46)	11 Jan 2017
81	69	Spider-Woman	Agent of S.W.O.R.D. (Spider-Woman (Vol.4) #1–7)	Dark Destiny! (Marvel Spotlight #32)	25 Jan 2017
82	95	Young Avengers	Young Avengers Presents (Vol. 1) #1–6	Young Avengers (Vol. 1) #1	8 Feb 2017
83	74	She-Hulk	From Savage to Sensational (Sensational She-Hulk #1–8)	The She-Hulk Lives! (Savage She-Hulk #1)	22 Feb 2017
84	77	New Mutants	The New Mutants (Vol. 1) #18–21	Renewal (Marvel Graphic Novel #4)	8 Mar 2017
85	97	Pet Avengers	Lockjaw and the Pet Avengers (Vol. 1) #1–4	Avengers vs. Pet Avengers (Vol. 1) 1–4	22 Mar 2017
86	76	Cloak & Dagger	Child of Darkness, Child of Light (Cloak & Dagger #1–4)	Cloak and Dagger! (Peter Parker, The Spectacular Spider-Man #64)	5 Apr 2017
87	73	Union Jack	Union Jack: London Falling (Union Jack (vol. 2) #1–4)	Union Jack (Union Jack #1–3)	19 Apr 2017
88	86	Spider-Man 2099	Out of Time (Spider-Man 2099 (vol. 2) #1–5), Homecoming, Sort of (material from Amazing Spider-Man (vol. 3) #1)	Spider-Man 2099 (vol. 1) #1–3	3 May 2017
89	82	New Warriors	New Warriors #1–6	The Mighty Thor #411–412	17 May 2017
90	80	Excalibur	The Sword is Drawn! (Excalibur #1–5, Excalibur Special)	None	31 May 2017
91	99	Venom (Flash Thompson)	Toxin with a Vengeance! (Venom (Vol. 2) #31–35)	Flashbacks! (Amazing Spider-Man #574); Project Rebirth 2.0 (Venom (Vol. 2) #1)	14 Jun 2017
92	72	Alpha Flight	Alpha Flight (vol. 1) #1–6 & material from Alpha Flight (vol. 1) #7-#8	Wanted: Wolverine! Dead or Alive! (X-Men #120)	28 Jun 2017
93	100	Miles Morales: Ultimate Spider-Man	Spider-Men (Spider-Men #1–5)	Spider-Man No More (Part IV) (material from Ultimate Fallout #4); All-New Ultimate Spider-Man (Ultimate Comics Spider-Man (vol. 2) #1)	12 Jul 2017
94	90	Marvel Boy	Marvel Boy (vol. 2) 1–6	None	26 Jul 2017
95	63	Ben Reilly: Scarlet Spider	Spider-Man: Redemption #1–4 / Peter Parker: Spider-Man #75	Even If I Live, I Die (Amazing Spider-Man #149)	09 Aug 2017
96	70	Quasar	Quasar #1–9	None	23 Aug 2017
97	88	Thunderbolts	Justice Like Lightning... (Thunderbolts (vol. 1) #1–5, Thunderbolts Annual 1997)	Brakoow (Incredible Hulk #449)	06 Sep 2017
98	78	Beta Ray Bill	Stormbreaker: The Saga of Beta Ray Bill #1–6	Thor #337–338	20 Sep 2017
99	84	Squirrel Girl	Squirrel Power (Unbeatable Squirrel Girl (vol. 1) #1–5)	material from Marvel Super Heroes (vol. 2) #8	04 Oct 2017
100	68	Machine Man	Machine Man (vol. 2) (AKA Machine Man 2020) #1–4	Machine Man (vol. 1) #1 & Marvel Two-In-One #92–93	18 Oct 2017
101	108	Ghost Rider (Robbie Reyes)	Legend! (All-New Ghost Rider #6–10)	All-New Ghost Rider #1	1 Nov 2017
102	104	The Superior Spider-Man	Versus (Superior Spider-Man Team-up #1–4, Scarlet Spider (vol. 2) #20)	Superior Spider-Man #1	15 Nov 2017
103	103	Agent Coulson	Perfect Bullets (S.H.I.E.L.D. (vol. 3) #1–6)	None	29 Nov 2017
104	106	Ms. Marvel (Kamala Khan)	Generation Why (Ms. Marvel (vol. 3) #6–11)	Ms. Marvel (vol. 3) #1, Material from All-New Marvel Point One	13 Dec 2017
105	102	Nick Fury Jr.	Reverie (Secret Avengers (vol. 2) #1–5)	Battle Scars #1, Material from Marvel Now! Point One	27 Dec 2017
106	109	Spider-Gwen	Web Warriors: Electroverse (Web-Warriors #1–5)	Edge of Spider-Verse #2	10 Jan 2018
107	101	Nova (Sam Alexander)	Nova Corpse (Nova (vol. 5) #11–16)	Nova (vol. 5) #1–2	24 Jan 2018
108	107	Silk	Life and Times of Cindy Moon (Silk (vol. 1) #1–7)	Amazing Spider-Man (vol. 3) #4	7 Feb 2018
109	105	Angela	Angela, Asgard's Assassin: Priceless (Angela: Asgard's Assassin #1–6)	Guardians of the Galaxy (vol. 3) #5–6	21 Feb 2018
110	110	Totally Awesome Hulk	Cho Time (Totally Awesome Hulk #1–6)	material from Amazing Fantasy (vol. 2) #15	7 Mar 2018
111	111	Gwenpool	Believe It (Unbelievable Gwenpool #1–6)	material from Howard the Duck (vol. 6) #1–3	21 Mar 2018
112	112	Iron Heart	Invincible Iron Man: Ironheart (Invincible Iron Man (vol. 3) #1–5	material from Invincible Iron Man (vol. 2) #7–14	04 Apr 2018
113	113	Infamous Iron Man	Infamous (Infamous Iron Man #1–6)	none	18 Apr 2018
114	118	X-23	Innocence Lost (X-23 (vol. 1) #1–6)	none	2 May 2018
115	115	Rogue	Rogue (vol. 1) #1–4	Avengers (vol. 1) Annual #10, Uncanny X-Men (vol. 1) #171	16 May 2018
116	116	Cable	War Baby (Cable vol. 2) #1–5	New Mutants (vol. 1) #87	30 May 2018
117	114	Kitty Pryde	Kitty Pryde & Wolverine #1–6	Uncanny X-Men (vol. 1) #129–131	13 Jun 2018
118	117	Gambit	Gambit (vol. 3) #1–7	Uncanny X-Men (vol. 1) #266	27 Jun 2018
119	128	Thanos	Thanos Rising #1–5	Iron Man (vol. 1) #55	11 Jul 2018
120	119	Red Skull	Red Zone (Avengers (vol. 3) #65–70)	Captain America Comics #7, Tales of Suspense #79	25 Jul 2018
121	122	Doctor Octopus	Spider-Man: Doctor Octopus: Year One #1–5	Amazing Spider-Man #3	8 Aug 2018
122	123	Magneto	X-Men (Vol. 2) #85–87, Uncanny X-Men #366–367, X-Men: The Magneto War #1	Magneto Rex #1–3	22 Aug 2018
123	126	Kingpin	Daredevil: Love & War (Marvel Graphic Novel # 24)	Amazing Spider-Man (vol. 1) #50–52	5 Sep 2018
124	130	Venom	Venom: Dark Origin #1–5	Amazing Spider-Man (vol. 1) #300	19 Sep 2018
125	124	Green Goblin	Peter Parker: Spider-Man: Return of the Goblin(Peter Parker: Spider-Man #44–47)	Amazing Spider-Man (vol. 1) #14	3 Oct 2018
126	120	Doctor Doom	Books of Doom #1–6	Fantastic Four (Vol. 1) #5	17 Oct 2018
127	121	Loki	Loki (Vol. 1) #1–4	Journey into Mystery (Vol. 1) #85	31 Oct 2018
128	125	MODOK	Super-Villain Team-Up: Modok's 11 #1–5	Tales of Suspense #93–94, Captain America (Vol. 1) #133	14 Nov 2018
129	127	Ultron	Avengers: Rage of Ultron	Avengers (Vol. 1) #54–55	28 Nov 2018
130	129	Apocalypse	Rise of Apocalypse #1–4	X-Factor (Vol. 1) #5–6	12 Dec 2018

=== International exclusives ===
Title	Main Feature Story	First/Early Appearance Story/Stories	Released in	Release date
Quicksilver	The Siege of Wundagore (Quicksilver #11–13, Heroes for Hire #15–16 and Heroes for Hire & Quicksilver Annual '98)	None	Brazil, Argentina, Czech Republic, Poland	July 14, 2016
Iron Man	Mask in the Iron Man (Iron Man (Vol. 3) #1/2, 26–30)	Tales of Suspense #39	Czech Republic, Perú, Poland, Argentina, Germany, Russia, France, Hungary	October 21, 2016
X-Men	X-Men: Season One	Marvel Graphic Novel #5 (God Loves, Man Kills)	Czech Republic, Argentina, Perú, Poland, Germany, Russia, France	January 27, 2017
Jean Grey	X-Men #30, The Adventures of Cyclops and Phoenix #1–4	X-Men Origins: Jean Grey	Brazil, Argentina, Czech Republic, Poland	May 19, 2017
Wonder Man	Avengers Two: Wonder Man & the Beast #1–3	Avengers (1963) #9, 158	France	July 6, 2017
Punisher	The Punisher: Year One #1–4	Amazing Spider-Man #129	Germany	October 11, 2017
Deadpool	Deadpool: The Circle Chase #1–4, excerpts from Deadpool #900	New Mutants #98	Germany	April 25, 2018
Secret Avengers	Secret Avengers #16–20	Secret Avengers #1	Brazil, Argentina, France, Czech Republic	February 25, 2019
Deathlok	Deathlok #1–4	Astonishing Tales #25	Brazil, Argentina, France, Poland, Czech Republic	March 8, 2019
Killraven	Killraven (2002) #1–6	Amazing Adventures (1970) # 18–19	France, Poland, Czech Republic	July 9, 2019
Thanos	Thanos Quest #1–2	Iron Man (vol. 1) # 55	Brazil, Argentina, Germany	April 5, 2019
Uncanny X-Men	Uncanny X-Men #141–142	Marvel Graphic Novel #5 (God Loves, Man Kills)	France	December 24, 2019

== The All Killer, No Filler Deadpool Collection ==
The third series from Hachette Partworks began in August 2018.

Issue	Volume	Title	Collects	Release date
01	64	Deadpool Kills The Marvel Universe / Deadpool Killustrated	Deadpool Kills the Marvel Universe #1–4 and Deadpool Killustrated #1–4	August 31, 2018
02	19	Cable & Deadpool: If Looks Could Kill	Cable & Deadpool #1–6	September 14, 2018
03	71	Deadpool: The Good, The Bad and The Ugly	Deadpool (vol. 3) #13–19	September 28, 2018
04	70	Deadpool Kills Deadpool / Deadpool vs Carnage	Deadpool Kills Deadpool 1–4 & Deadpool vs. Carnage 1–4	October 12, 2018
05	05	Deadpool: Hey, It's Deadpool!	Deadpool (vol. 1) #1–5 & Deadpool #-1	October 26, 2018
06	27	Wolverine Origins: Deadpool	Wolverine Origins #21–25	November 9, 2018
07	01	Deadpool Beginnings	New Mutants #98, X-Force #2, #11 & #15, Nomad #4, Avengers #366 and material from X-Force #4–5, #10, #14 and #19–24	November 23, 2018
08	28	Deadpool: Secret Invasion	Deadpool (vol. 2) #1–5 and Marvel Comics Presents #10	December 5, 2018
09	32	Deadpool – Merc with a Mouth: Head Trip	Deadpool: Merc with a Mouth #1–6	December 19, 2018
10	74	Night of The Living Deadpool / Return of the Living Deadpool	Night of The Living Deadpool #1–4 & Return of the Living Deadpool #1–4	January 2, 2019
11	20	Cable & Deadpool: The Burnt Offering	Cable & Deadpool #7–12	January 16, 2019
12	06	Deadpool: We Don't Need Another Hero...	Deadpool (vol. 1) #6–8 and Daredevil/Deadpool Annual 1997	January 30, 2019
13	66	Deadpool: Dead Presidents	Deadpool (vol. 3) #1–6	February 13, 2019
14	29	Deadpool: Dark Reign	Deadpool (vol. 2) #6–12 and Thunderbolts #130–131	February 27, 2019
15	30	X-Force/Cable: Messiah War	X-Force/Cable: Messiah War, Cable (Vol. 2) #13–15, X-Force (Vol. 3) #14–16	March 13, 2019
16	07	Deadpool: The Drowning Man	Deadpool (vol. 1) #9–13, material from Contest of Champions II #1 and #3–5	March 27, 2019
17	37	Deadpool – Merc With a Mouth: Are You There, Deadpool? It's Me, Deadpool	Deadpool: Merc With a Mouth #7–13, Lady Deadpool #1	April 10, 2019
18	21	Cable & Deadpool: The Human Race	Cable & Deadpool #13–18	April 24, 2019
19	50	Uncanny X-Force: The Apocalypse Solution and Deathlok Nation	Uncanny X-Force (Vol. 1) #1-7, #5.1, Astonishing Tales, (Vol. 1) #25 and material from Wolverine: Road to Hell	May 8, 2019
20	69	Deadpool: Soul Hunter	Deadpool (vol. 3) #7–12, extracts from A+X #8	May 22, 2019
21	33	Deadpool: X Marks the Spot	Deadpool (vol. 2) #13–18	June 5, 2019
22	02	Deadpool: The Circle Chase	Deadpool: The Circle Chase #1–4, Silver Sable & the Wild Pack #23	June 19, 2019
23	08	Deadpool: Payback	Deadpool (vol. 1) #14–19, Deadpool & Death annual 1998	July 3, 2019
24	22	Cable & Deadpool: Bosom Buddies	Cable & Deadpool #19–24	July 17, 2019
25	54	Identity Wars	Amazing Spider-Man Annual #38, Deadpool (vol. 3) Annual #1 and Incredible Hulks Annual #1	July 31, 2019
26	45	Deadpool: Pulp	Deadpool Pulp #1–4	August 14, 2019
27	09	Deadpool: Dead Reckoning	Deadpool (Vol. 1) #20–25, #0	August 28, 2019
28	73	Deadpool: Deadpool Vs. S.H.I.E.L.D.	Deadpool (vol. 3) #20–25, Deadpool B-Annual #1	September 11, 2019
29	39	Prelude to Deadpool Corps	Deadpool Prelude to Deadpool Corps #1–5	September 25, 2019
30	23	Cable & Deadpool: Living Legends	Cable & Deadpool #25–29	October 9, 2019
31	40	Deadpool Corps: Pool-Pocalypse Now	Deadpool Corps #1–6	October 23, 2019
32	38	Deadpool: Monkey Business	Deadpool (vol. 2) #19–22 & Hit-Monkey #1	November 6, 2019
33	53	Uncanny X-Force: The Dark Angel Saga Book 1	Uncanny X-Force (Vol. 1) #8–13	November 20, 2019
34	10	Deadpool: Truth and Lies	Deadpool (Vol. 1) #26–33, Wolverine Annual '99	December 4, 2019
35	46	Deadpool Corps: You Say You Want a Revolution	Deadpool Corps #7–12	December 18, 2019
36	03	Deadpool: Sins of the Past	Deadpool: Sins of the Past #1–4	January 2, 2020
37	11	Deadpool: Chapter X	Deadpool (vol. 1) #34-37, Deadpool Team-Up #1, Baby's First Deadpool	January 15, 2020
38	76	Deadpool: The Wedding of Deadpool	Deadpool (vol. 3) #26–28, Deadpool Annual #1	January 29, 2020
39	24	Cable & Deadpool: Paved With Good Intentions	Cable & Deadpool #30–35	February 12, 2020
40	57	Uncanny X-Force: The Dark Angel Saga Book 2	Uncanny X-Force (Vol. 1) #14–19	February 26, 2020
41	31	Deadpool : Suicide Kings	Deadpool : Suicide Kings #1-5, Deadpool Annual : Games Of Death #1 and material from Shang-Chi : Master of King Fu #1	March 11, 2020
42	41	Deadpool: What Happens in Vegas	Deadpool (vol. 2) #23-26, The Amazing Spider-Man #611 and material from Marvel Adventures Super Heroes #4	March 25, 2020
43	12	Deadpool: Cat Trap	Deadpool (vol. 1) #38-45 and Black Panther (vol. 2) #23	April 15, 2020
44	67	Thunderbolts: No Quarter	Thunderbolts (Vol. 3) #1–6	May 6, 2020
45	55	Deadpool: Fear Itself	Fear Itself: Deadpool #1–3 and Fear itself: Uncanny X-Force #1-3	May 27, 2020
46	13	Deadpool: Cruel Summer	Deadpool (Vol. 1) #46-51, material from Gambit #17-18 and Wolverine #154-155	June 10, 2020
47	04	Deadpool: Misalliances	Material from Wolverine Annual '95, excepts from X-Force #46, 71, 73 & 75, X-Force #47 & #55 & Heroes for Hire #10-11	June 24, 2020
48	36	Deadpool Team-Up: Good Buddies	Deadpool Team-Up #899–894	July 8, 2020
49	60	Uncanny X-Force: Otherworld	Uncanny X-Force (Vol. 1) #20-24	July 22, 2020
50	44	Deadpool: I Rule, You Suck	Deadpool (vol. 2) #27–31	August 5, 2020
51	14	Deadpool: End Of The Road	Deadpool (Vol. 1) #52–56	August 19, 2020
52	68	Thunderbolts: Red Scare	Thunderbolts (Vol. 3) #7–12	September 2, 2020
53	42	Deadpool Team-Up: Special Relationship	Deadpool Team-Up #893–889	September 16, 2020
54	25	Cable & Deadpool: Separation Anxiety	Cable & Deadpool #36–42	September 30, 2020
55	15	Deadpool: Agent Of Weapon X	Deadpool (Vol. 1) #57–64	October 14, 2020
56	34	Hulk: Code Red	Hulk (v.2) #14–17	October 28, 2020
57	51	Deadpool: Space Oddity & Operation Annihilation	Deadpool (vol. 2) #32–39, 33.1	November 11, 2020
58	47	Deadpool Team-Up: BFFs	Deadpool Team-up #888-883 and Wolverine?Deadpool: The Decoy #1	November 25, 2020
59	72	Thunderbolts: Infinity	Thunderbolts (Vol. 3) #13–19	December 9, 2020
60	48	Deadpool Max: Nutjob	Deadpool Max #1-6	December 23, 2020
61	16	Deadpool: Healing Factor	Deadpool (Vol.1) #65-69	January 6, 2021
62	26	Cable & Deadpool: Deadpool vs. The Marvel Universe	Cable & Deadpool #43–50	January 20, 2021
63	63	Uncanny X-Force: Final Execution Book 1	Uncanny X-Force (Vol. 1) #25-29	February 3, 2021
64	77	Deadpool: Original Sin	Deadpool (vol. 3) #29–34	February 17, 2021
65	43	Deadpool: Wade Wilson's War	Deadpool: Wade Wilson's War #1=4 and material from Captain America: Who Won't Wield The Shield #1	March 3, 2021
66	56	Deadpool: Institutionalised	Deadpool (vol. 2) #40–44	March 17, 2021
67	65	Uncanny X-Force: Final Execution Book 2	Uncanny X-Force (Vol. 1) #30-35	March 31, 2021
68	58	Deadpool: Evil Deadpool	Deadpool (vol. 2) #45–49	April 14, 2021
69	52	Deadpool Max: Involuntary Armageddon	Deadpool Max #7–12	April 28, 2021
70	79	Deadpool: AXIS	Deadpool (vol. 3) #35–40	May 12, 2021
71	75	Thunderbolts: No Mercy	Thunderbolts (Vol. 3) #20-26	May 26, 2021
72	49	Deadpool: All In The Family	Deadpool Family, Cable (vol. 2) #25, and Deadpool and Cable #26	June 9, 2021
73	17	Agent X: Dead Man's Switch	Agent X #1-7	June 23, 2021
74	59	Deadpool Max : Second Cut	Deadpool Max 2 #1-6 and Deadpool Max X-Mas Special #1	July 4, 2021
75	61	Deadpool: Dead	Deadpool (vol. 2) #50–54	July 21, 2021
76	78	Thunderbolts: Punisher vs The Thunderbolts	Thunderbolts (Vol. 3) #27-32	August 4, 2021
77	18	Agent X: Deadpool Walking	Agent X #8-15	August 18, 2021
78	62	Deadpool: Reborn	Deadpool (vol. 2) #55–63	September 1, 2021
79	80	Deadpool: All Good Things	Deadpool (vol. 3) #41–44, Deadpool #250	September 15, 2021
80	35	Deadpool: Choice Cuts	Deadpool (vol. 2) #900 and #1000	September 29, 2021
81	81	Deadpool: Dracula's Gauntlet	Deadpool: Dracula's Gauntlet #1-7	October 13, 2021
82	87	Deadpool: World's Greatest: Millionaire With A Mouth	Deadpool (vol. 4) #1-6, #3.1, material from Hulk (vol. 3) #12-13 and Hulk (vol. 3) #14	October 27, 2021
83	89	Spider-Man/Deadpool: Isn't It Bromantic?	Spider-Man/Deadpool #1-8	November 10, 2021
84	86	Uncanny Avengers: Lost Future	Avengers (volume 6) #0 and Uncanny Avengers (volume 3) #1-8	November 24, 2021
85	82	Deadpool Vs X-Force/Deadpool's Art of War	Deadpool Vs X-Force #1-4 & Deadpool's Art of War #1-4	December 8, 2021
86	90	Deadpool: World's Greatest: Deadpool Vs Sabretooth	Deadpool (vol. 4) #7-12 & Deadpool: Last Days of Magic #1	December 22, 2021
87	96	Spider-Man/Deadpool: Itsy Bitsy	Spider-Man/Deadpool #9-14 and #17-18	January 5, 2022
88	92	Uncanny Avengers: Civil War II	Uncanny Avengers (volume 3) #9-15	January 19, 2022
89	88	Deadpool & Cable: Split Second	Deadpool & Cable: Split Second Infinite Comic #1-3 and Cable & Deadpool Annual 2018	February 2, 2022
90	83	Hawkeye Vs. Deadpool	Hawkeye Vs. Deadpool #0-4 and material from Gwenpool Holiday Special #1	February 16, 2022
91	94	Deadpool V. Gambit: The V. Is For Versus	Deadpool V. Gambit #1-5 and Mr and Mrs X #2-3	March 2, 2022
92	93	Deadpool: World's Greatest: Civil War II	Deadpool (vol. 4) #13-19	March 16, 2022
93	84	Deadpool's Secret Secret Wars/Mrs Deadpool and the Howling Commandos	Deadpool's Secret Secret Wars #1-4 & Mrs Deadpool and the Howling Commandos #1-4	March 30, 2022
94	91	Deadpool and The Mercs for Money: Merc Madness	Deadpool and The Mercs for Money #1-5 and Deadpool: Massacre #1	April 13, 2022
95	97	Deadpool: Patience Zero	Deadpool (vol. 4) #20-25 and Deadpool Annual #1	April 27, 2022
96	85	Deadpool vs. Thanos	Deadpool vs. Thanos #1-4, Guardians Team-Up #10 and material from Marvel Comics Presents #6	May 11, 2022
97	95	Deadpool and The Mercs for Money II	Deadpool and The Mercs for Money (Vol. 2) #1-8	May 25, 2022
98	99	Uncanny Avengers: Red Skull	Uncanny Avengers (vol. 3) #18-23	June 8, 2022
99	98	Deadpool: Back in Black	Deadpool: Back in Black #1-5 and material from Gwenpool Holiday Special Merry Mix-Up #1	June 22, 2022
100	100	Deadpool: World's Greatest: Deadpool Does Shakespeare	Deadpool (vol. 4) #21, #26-27 and The Unbelievable Gwenpool #12-13	July 6, 2022

== X-Men: The Essential Collection ==
Two further Marvel Collections were market trialed by Hachette, an Avengers series in 2018 and an X-Men series in 2019. The Avengers series did not go to a full release and remaining market trial stock was added to the Hachette webstore in early 2019 including oversized variants of the 3 trial books. In late October 2019 remaining market trial stock from the X-Men trial and an "Alien" and "Predator" series that had been trialed in late 2018 were also added to the webstore indicating that they were unlikely to go to a full launch. The Collection has been launched in France in October 2020.

Issue	Volume	Title	Collects	Release date
1	43	Mutant Genesis 2.0	X-Men (vol. 2) #1–7	October 15, 2020
2	5	Dark Phoenix	Uncanny X-Men #129–137	October 28, 2020
3	22	The Asgardian Wars	New Mutants Special Edition #1 and Uncanny X-Men Annual #9	November 12, 2020
4	25	Mutant Massacre (Part 1)	Uncanny X-Men #210–211, X-Factor #9–10, New Mutants #46, Thor #373 & Power Pack #27	November 25, 2020
5	26	Mutant Massacre (Part 2)	Uncanny X-Men #212–214, X-Factor #11, Thor #374 & Daredevil #238	December 9, 2020
6	69	E is for Extinction	New X-Men #114-117, New X-Men Annual 2001	December 23, 2020
7	1	Second Genesis	Giant-Size X-Men #1 & Uncanny X-Men #94–103	January, 05 2021
8	21	The Gift	X-Men & Alpha Flight #1 & 2, Uncanny X-Men Annual #8	January 20, 2021
9	17	Lifedeath	Uncanny X-Men #186–192	February, 03 2021
10	33	Inferno (Part 1)	Uncanny X-Men #239-240, X-Terminators #1-3, X-Factor #36	February 17, 2021
11	34	Inferno (Part 2)	Uncanny X-Men #241, New Mutants #71-73, X-Terminators #4, X-Factor #37	March, 03 2021
12	35	Inferno (Part 3)	Uncanny X-Men #242-243, X-Factor #38-39, X-Factor Annual #4, What If? Vol. 2 #6	March 18, 2021
13	15	Public Enemy	Uncanny X-Men #180-185, Marvel Fanfare #40 (2)	March 31, 2021
14	70	Imperial	New X-Men #118-126	April 14, 2021
15	48	The Wedding of Cyclops and Phoenix	X-Men (vol. 2) #30, The Adventures of Cyclops and Phoenix #1–4	April 28, 2021
16	74	Gifted	Astonishing X-Men #1-6	May 11, 2021
17	24	Ghosts	Uncanny X-Men #204-209	May 25, 2021
18	61	Operation Zero Tolerance (part 1)	Uncanny X-Men #346, Generation X #27-29, Wolverine #115, X-Men #65-66 and X-Men #-1	June 9, 2021
19	62	Operation Zero Tolerance (part 2)	X-Men #67-69, Generation X #30-31, Wolverine #116-118	June 22, 2021
20	2	Magneto Triumphant	Uncanny X-Men #104-113	July 5, 2021
21	28	The Four Horsemen	X-Factor #17-23	July 22, 2021
22	75	Dangerous	Astonishing X-Men #7-12	August 4, 2021
23	65	The Twelve	Uncanny X-Men 376–377, Cable 75–76, X-Men 96–97, Wolverine 146-147	August 17, 2021
24	66	Ages of Apocalypse	Uncanny X-Men #378, Cable #77, Wolverine #148, X-Men (vol. 2) #98, X-Men Unlimited #26, The Search for Cyclops 1-4	August 28, 2021
25	9	Magik	Uncanny X-Men #158-160, Storm and Illyana: Magik #1-4	September 14, 2021
26	71	Weapon XII	New X-Men #127-133	September 29, 2021
27	63	The Hunt for Xavier	Uncanny X-Men #360, #362-364, X-Men #80, #82-84	October 12, 2021
28	3	Wanted: Wolverine !	Uncanny X-Men #114-121	October 28, 2021
29	11	Renewal	Marvel Graphic Novel #4, New Mutants #1-7	November 11, 2021
30	79	Torn	Astonishing X-Men #13-18	November 26, 2021
31	32	Welcome to Genosha	Uncanny X-Men 235–238, X-Men Annual 12	December 7, 2021
32	72	Riot At Xavier's	New X-Men #134-141	December 17, 2021
33	51	The Legion Quest	Uncanny X-Men 318–321, X-Men 40-41 & X-Factor 109	December 31, 2021
34	52	Age of Apocalypse (part 1)	X-Men: Alpha #1, Generation Next #1, Astonishing X-Men #1, Gambit & the X-Ternals #1, Factor-X #1, X-Man #1 & X-Calibre #1	January 17, 2022
35	53	Age of Apocalypse (part 2)	Astonishing X-Men #2, Gambit & the X-Ternals #2, Factor-X #2, Weapon X #1-2, Amazing X-Men #1-2 & X-Calibre #2	February 3, 2022
36	54	Age of Apocalypse (part 3)	Generation Next #2, X-Man #2, X-Calibre #3, Factor-X #3, Astonishing X-Men #3, Amazing X-Men #3, Weapon X #3 & Gambit & the X-Ternals #3	February 15, 2022
37	55	Age of Apocalypse (part 4)	X-Man #3-4, Generation Next #3-4, Astonishing X-Men #4, X-Calibre #4, X-Universe #1	March 3, 2022
38	56	Age of Apocalypse (part 5)	Gambit & the X-Ternals #4, Factor-X #4, Weapon X #4, Amazing X-Men #4, X-Universe #1, X-Men Omega #1	March 17, 2022
39	4	A Fire In The Sky!	Uncanny X-Men #122-128, Uncanny X-Men Annual #3	March 31, 2022
40	77	House of M	House of M #1-8	April 14, 2022
41	41	The Muir Island Saga	Uncanny X-Men #278-280, X-Factor #65-70	April 28, 2022
42	37	Acts of Vengeance	Uncanny X-Men #256-261	May 12, 2022
43	6	Days of Future Past	Uncanny X-Men #138-143 + Uncanny X-Men Annual #4	May 27, 2022
44	47	Fatal Attractions	Uncanny X-Men 304, X-Factor 92, X-Force 25, X-Men 25, Wolverine 75, Excalibur 71	June 9, 2022
45	13	Honor	Uncanny X-Men 169–173, Wolverine 1-4	June 23, 2022
46	80	Unstoppable	Astonishing X-Men #19-24, Giant-Size Astonishing X-Men #1	July 7, 2022
47	67	Dream's End	Uncanny X-Men #388-390, Cable #87, Bishop the Last X-Man #16, X-Men #108-110	July 21, 2022
48	73	Planet X	New X-Men #142-150	August 4, 2022
49	45	The Executionner's song (part 1)	Uncanny X-Men #294-295, X-Factor #84-85, X-Men #14, X-Force #16	August 18, 2022
50	46	The Executionner's song (part 2)	Uncanny X-Men #296-297, X-Factor #86, X-Men #15-16, X-Force #17-18	September 2, 2022
51	78	Deadly Genesis	X-Men: Deadly Genesis 1-6	September 14, 2022
52	39	X-Tinction Agenda	Uncanny X-Men #270-272, X-Factor #60-62, New mutants #95-97	September 29, 2022
53	31	Return of the Brood	Uncanny X-Men #229-234	October 13, 2022
54	27	Old Soldiers	Uncanny X-Men #215-220, Uncanny X-Men Annual #10	October 27, 2022
55	49	The Phallanx Covenant (part 1)	Uncanny X-Men #311-316, X-Men (vol 2) #36	November 11, 2022
56	50	The Phallanx Covenant (part 2)	Uncanny X-Men #317, X-Men (vol 2) #37, X-Factor #106, X-Force #38, Excalibur #82, Wolverine #85, Cable #16	November 24, 2022
57	76	Phoenix Endsong	Phoenix Endsong #1-5	December 8, 2022
58	40	Crossroads	Uncanny X-Men #273-277	December 21, 2022
59	8	The Hellfire Gambit	Uncanny X-Men #151-157, Annual #5	January 5, 2023
60	20	The Trial of Magneto	Uncanny X-Men #199-203, excerpts from Marvel Fanfare #33	January 20, 2023
61	23	The Rise of the Phoenix	Classic X-Men #43, Avengers #263, Fantastic Four #286, X-Factor #1, excerpts from Classic X-Men #8,18 and Bizarre Adventures #27,	February 3, 2023
62	10	The Brood Saga	Uncanny X-Men #161-167	February 16, 2023
63	29	Fall of the Mutants (part 1)	Uncanny X-Men #221-227, New Mutants #59	March 02, 2023
64	30	Fall of the Mutants (part 2)	X-Factor #24-26, Uncanny X-Men #228, New Mutants #60-61	March 16, 2023
65	12	God loves, man kills	Marvel graphic novel #5, Uncanny X-Men #168, Annual #6	March 30, 2023
66	64	The Magneto War	X-Men #85-87, Uncanny X-Men #366-367, X-Men The Magneto War #1	April 13, 2023
67	16	New Mutants: The Demon Bear Saga	New mutants #18-25, New mutants Annual #1	April 27, 2023
68	18	New Mutants: Legion	New mutants #26-34	may 5, 2023
69	14	Hell hath no fury	X-Men Special Edition #1, Marvel Fanfare #24, Uncanny X-Men #174-179	may 25, 2023
70	36	Storm Warnings!	Uncanny X-Men #249-255	June 9, 2023
71	42	Bishop's Crossing (part 1)	Uncanny X-Men #281-287	June 22, 2023
72	44	Bishop's Crossing (part 2)	X-Men #8, Uncanny X-Men #288-293	July 6, 2023
73	19	Lifedeath (2)	Uncanny X-Men #193-198	July 20, 2023
74	38	Gambit	Uncanny X-Men #262-269	August 16, 2023
75	7	Murderworld!	Uncanny X-Men #144-150, Avengers Annual 10	August 31, 2023
76	68	Eve of destruction	Uncanny X-Men #391-393, X-Men #111-113	September 14, 2023
77	57	Onslaught (part 1)	X-Men #53–54, Uncanny X-Men #334–335, X-Men: Onslaught, Avengers #400-401, Fantastic Four #414-415	September 22, 2023
78	58	Onslaught (part 2)	Cable #34, Incredible Hulk #444, Wolverine #104, X-Factor #125–126, Amazing Spider-Man #415, Green Goblin #12, Spider-Man #72, material from Excalibur #100	October 12, 2023
79	59	Onslaught (part 3)	X-Man #18–19, X-Force #57–58, Punisher #11, X-Men #55, Uncanny X-Men #336, Cable #35, Incredible Hulk #445	October 26, 2023
80	60	Onslaught (part 4)	Iron Man #332, Avengers #402, Thor #502, Wolverine #105, Fantastic Four #416, X-Men #56, Onslaught: Marvel Universe	November 9, 2023
81	93	Lovelorn	Uncanny X-Men #504-507, Uncanny X-men Annual (vol. 2) #2	November 23, 2023
82	100	X-Necrosha (part 1)	X-Necrosha #1, X-Force (Vol. 3) #21-25, New Mutants (vol. 3) #6-8	December 05, 2023
83	101	X-Necrosha (part 2)	New X-Men 32, X-Force (3) 11, X-Force Annual 1, X-Men 231-234, X-Necrosha : The Gathering 1	January 04, 2024
84	109	Age of X	Age of X Alpha, Age of X : Universe 1, New Mutants (Vol. 3)22-24, X-Men: Legacy 245-249	January 18, 2024
85	88	SFX	Uncanny #500-503, FCBD 2008, excerpts from Manifest Detsiny 1-5	February 01, 2024
86	110	Breaking Point	Uncanny #534.1, #535-539	February 15, 2024
87	89	Sins of the father	X Men Legacy #213-216, X-Men : Odd Men Out #1, The Unlikely Saga of Xavier, Magneto and Stan #1	February 29, 2024
88	85	Divided we stand (part 1)	Uncanny #495-496, excerpts from X Men : Divided we stand 1-2	March 14, 2024
89	86	Divided we stand (part 2)	Uncanny #497-499, X-Men Legacy #208-210	March 22, 2024
90	82	eXogenetic	Astonishing X-men #31 à 35	April 11, 2024
91	115	Five Miles South of the Universe	X-Men Legacy #254-260	April 23, 2024
92	83	Messiah Complex (part 1)	X-Men: Messiah Complex 1 + Uncanny 492-493 + New X-Men 44 + X-Factor 25-26 + X-Men 205	may 10, 2024
93	84	Messiah Complex (part 2)	Uncanny #494 + X-Factor #27 + X-Men #206 à 207 + New X-Men #45 à 46	may 23, 2024
94	87	More X-Men	X-Men Legacy #211-212, King Size Cable Spectacular #1, X-Men vs Hulk #1	June 6, 2024
95	117	Future Foundation	X-men (vol. 3) #15.1 + #16 à 19	June 20, 2024
96	105	Collision	X-Men Legacy #238-241, Marvel Comics presents 3	July 4, 2024
97	114	Schisme	X-Men: Schism 1-5, X-Men: Regenesis 1	July 18, 2024
98	108	Aftermath	X-Men Legacy #242-244 & #248-249	August 1, 2024
99	92	Messiah War	X-Force / Cable: Messiah War #1, X-Force 14-16, Cable 13-15, X-Men: Future History: Messiah War Sourcebook	TBA
100	TBA	First to last	TBA	TBA
101	TBA	Original Sin	TBA	TBA

== Marvel Origines ==
A new collection on sale on the French version of Hachette site. This has been tested 10 months ago, and starts now, in August 2022.

It is intended to be completed in 100 issues.

It seems that the collection will be edited in order, starting with the oldest comics around 1961-1962 and estimated to arrive around the late sixties. It seems also that the volumes follow the Italian collection which contains 300 softcover issues. The first issues seem to be the exact replica, except for the hardcover.

Issue	Title	Collects	Pages	Release date
1	Spider-Man 1 (1962)	Amazing Fantasy #15, Amazing Spider-Man #1-5	122	August 18, 2022
2	Fantastic Four 1 (1962)	Fantastic Four #1-5	118	September 2, 2022
3	Thor 1 (1962)	Journey into mystery #83-91	114	September 13, 2022
4	Hulk 1 (1962)	Incredible Hulk #1-6	144	September 29, 2022
5	Fantastic Four 2 (1962)	Fantastic Four #6-10	117	October 13, 2022
6	Iron Man 1 (1963)	Tales of Suspense #39-46	109	October 27, 2022
7	Fantastic Four 3 (1963)	Fantastic Four #11-15	109	November 11, 2022
8	Thor 2 (1963)	Journey into Mystery #92-99	119	November 24, 2022
9	Fantastic Four 4	Fantastic Four #16-18, Fantastic Four Annual #1	108	December 8, 2022
10	Avengers 1	Avengers #1-5	115	December 21, 2022
11	Spider-Man 2	Amazing Spider-Man #6-10	109	January 5, 2023
12	Fantastic Four 5	Fantastic Four #19-23	110	January 19, 2023
13	Iron Man 2	Tales of Suspense #47-53	106	February 2, 2023
14	Thor 3	Journey into Mystery #100-105	113	February 16, 2023
15	Spider-Man 3	Amazing Spider-Man #11-15	109	March 2, 2023
16	Fantastic Four 6	Fantastic Four #24-28	114	March 16, 2023
17	Hulk 2	Tales to astonish #59-68	108	March 30, 2023
18	Daredevil 1	Daredevil #1-5	109	April 13, 2023
19	Iron Man 3	Tales of Suspense #54-60	110	April 27, 2023
20	Thor 4	Journey into Mystery #106-110	113	may 11, 2023
21	Avengers 2	Avengers #6-10	107	may 25, 2023
22	Spider-Man 4	Amazing Spider-Man Annual #1, Amazing Spider-Man #16-17	85	June 9, 2023
23	Fantastic Four 7	Fantastic Four #29-31, Fantastic Four Annual #2	102	June 22, 2023
24	Spider-Man 5	Amazing Spider-Man #18-22	104	July 6, 2023
25	Captain America 1	Tales of Suspense #59-68	100	July 20, 2023
26	Thor 5	Journey into Mystery #111-115	105	August 3, 2023
27	Fantastic Four 8	Fantastic Four #32-36	102	aug 16, 2023
28	Iron Man 4	Tales of Suspense #61-69	108	aug 31, 2023
29	Avengers 3	Avengers #11-16	120	sept 14, 2023
30	Daredevil 2	Daredevil #6-10	100	sept 22, 2023
31	Spider-Man 6	Amazing Spider-Man #23-27	100	oct 12, 2023
32	Fantastic Four 9	Fantastic Four #37-41	100	oct 26, 2023
33	Thor 6	Journey into Mystery #116-120	105	nov 9, 2023
34	Avengers 4	Avengers #17-22	120	nov 23, 2023
35	Hulk 3	Tales to astonish #69-78	100	dec 5, 2023
36	Spider-Man 7	Amazing Spider-Man #28-31, Annual 2	100	dec 21, 2023
37	Captain America 2	Tales of Suspense #69-78	100	jan 4, 2023
38	Fantastic Four 10	Fantastic Four #42-45, Annual 3	103	jan 18, 2023
39	Iron Man 5	TBA	TBA	TBA
40	Thor 7	TBA	TBA	TBA
41	Daredevil 3	TBA	TBA	TBA

== Marvel Ultimates ==
A new collection due in August 2024 in France, presenting 60 issues within which the complete ultimate universe is included.

Issue	Title	Collects
1	Ultimate Spider-Man 1	Ultimate Spider-Man Vol. 1 #1-13 et 1/2
2	Ultimate X-Men 1	Ultimate X-Men #1-12 et 1/2
3	Ultimates 1	The Ultimates #1-13
4	Ultimate Spider-Man 2	Ultimate Marvel Team-Up #1-8
5	Ultimate Fantastic Four 1	Ultimate Fantastic Four #1-12
6	Ultimate Spider-Man 3	Ultimate Spider-Man #14-27
7	Ultimate X-Men 2	Ultimate X-Men #13-25
8	Ultimate Spider-Man 4	Ultimate Marvel Team-Up #9-16 et Ultimate Spider-Man Super Special #1
9	Ultimate X-Men 3	Ultimate War #1-4 et Ultimate X-Men #26-33
10	Ultimate Spider-Man 5	Ultimate Spider-Man #28-39
11	Ultimate Galactus	Ultimate Nightmare #1-5, Ultimate Secret #1-4, Ultimate Vision #0 et Ultimate Extinction #1-5
12	Ultimate Adventures	Ultimate Adventures #1-6, Spider-Man's Tangled Web #13
13	Ultimate Daredevil & Elektra	Ultimate Daredevil & Elektra #1-4, Ultimate Elektra #1-5
14	Ultimate Spider-Man 6	Ultimate Spider-Man #40-46 et Ultimate Six #1-7
15	Ultimate Fantastic Four 2	Ultimate Fantastic Four #13-26
16	Ultimate X-Men 4	Ultimate X-Men #34-45
17	Ultimate Spider-Man 7	Ultimate Spider-Man #47-59
18	Ultimates 2	Ultimates 2 #1-6 et Annual #1
19	Ultimates 3	Ultimates 2 #7-13 et Annual #2
20	Ultimate Spider-Man 8	Ultimate Spider-Man #60-71
21	Ultimate Fantastic Four 3	Ultimate Fantastic Four #27-38 et Annual #1
22	Ultimate X-Men 5	Ultimate X-Men #46-60
23	Ultimate Spider-Man 9	Ultimate Spider-Man #72-85
24	Ultimate Power	Ultimate Power #1-9 et Ultimate Vision #1-5
25	Ultimate Fantastic Four 4	Ultimate Fantastic Four #39-49, Annual #2 et Ultimate X4 #1-2
26	Ultimate Spider-Man 10	Ultimate Spider-Man #86-96 et Annuals #1-2
27	Ultimate Iron Man	Ultimate Iron Man #1-5 et Ultimate Iron Man II #1-5
28	Ultimate Hulk	Ultimate Wolverine vs Hulk #1-6 et Ultimate Human #1-4
29	Ultimate Spider-Man 11	Ultimate Spider-Man #97-105
30	Ultimate X-Men 6	Ultimate X-Men #61-74 et Annual #1
31	Ultimate Spider-Man 12	Ultimate Spider-Man #106-111 et Spider-Man/Kingpin : to the Death #1
32	Ultimate X-Men 7	Ultimate X-Men #75-83 et Annual #2
33	Ultimate Spider-Man 13	Ultimate Spider-Man #112-122 et Annual #3
34	Ultimates 4	The Ultimates Saga #1, The Ultimates 3 #1-5, Ultimate Captain America Annual #1 et Ultimate Hulk Annual #1
35	Ultimate X-Men 8	Ultimate X-men #84-93
36	Ultimatum	Ultimate Origins #1-5, Ultimatum #1-5 et Marvel Spotlight : Ultimatum #1
37	Ultimate Spider-Man 14	Ultimate Spider-Man #123-133 et Ultimatum : Spider-Man Requiem #1-2
38	Ultimate X-Men 9	Ultimate X-Men #94-100, Ultimate X-Men : Requiem #1 et Ultimate X #1-5
39	Ultimate Fantastic Four 5	Ultimate Fantastic Four #50-60, Ultimate Fantastic Four : Requiem #1, Ultimate X-Men/Fantastic Four Annual #1 et Ultimate Fantastic Four/X-Men Annual #1
40	Ultimate Spider-Man 15	Ultimate Comics : Spider-Man #1-14
41	Ultimate Avengers	Ultimate Comics : Avengers #1-6 et Ultimate Comics : Avengers II #1-6
42	Ultimate Spider-Man 16	Ultimate Comics : Enemy #1-4, Ultimate Comics : Mystery #1-4 et Ultimate Comics : Doom #1-4
43	Ultimate Iron Man & Captain America & Thor	Ultimate Comics : Armor Wars #1-4, Ultimate Comics : Captain America #1-4 et Ultimate Comics : Thor #1-4
44	Ultimate Avengers 2	Ultimate Comics : New Avengers #1-5 et Ultimate Comics : Avengers III #1-6
45	Ultimate Spider-Man 17	Ultimate Comics : Spider-Man #15 et Ultimate Spider-Man #150-160
46	Ultimates Avengers 3	Ultimate Comics : Avengers vs New Ultimates #1-6 et Ultimate Fallout #1-6
47	Ultimate Spider-Man 18	Ultimate Comics : All-New Spider-Man #1-12 et matériel de Ultimate Fallout #4
48	Ultimates 5	Ultimate Comics : Ultimates #1-12 et Ultimate Comics : Hawkeye #1-4
49	Ultimate X-Men 10	Ultimate Comics : X-Men #1-12
50	Ultimates 6	Ultimate Comics : Ultimates #13-24 et #18.1
51	Ultimate Spider-Man 19	Spider-Men #1-5 et Ultimate Comics : All-New Spider-Man #13-18
52	Ultimate X-Men 11	Ultimate Comics : X-Men #13-28 et #18.1
53	Ultimate Spider-Man 20	Ultimate Comics : All-New Spider-Man #19-29 et #16.1
54	Ultimates 7	Ultimate Comics : Ultimates #25-30, Cataclysm : Ultimates #1-3 et Ultimate Comics : Iron Man #1-4
55	Ultimate X-Men 12	Ultimate Comics : X-Men #24-33, Ultimate Comics : Wolverine #1-4 et Cataclysm : Ultimate X-Men #1-3
56	Ultimate Comics : Cataclysm	Hunger #1-4, Cataclysm : The Ultimates Last Stand #0.1 et #1-5, Cataclysm : Ultimate Spider-Man #1-3 et Survive! #1
57	All-New Ultimates	All-New Ultimates #1-12
58	Ultimate FF	Ultimate FF #1-6 et Fantastic Four #570-572
59	Miles Morales : Ultimate Spider-Man	Ultimate Spider-Man #200 et Miles Morales : Ultimate Spider-Man #1-9
60	Ultimate Spider-Man : The End	Miles Morales : Ultimate Spider-Man #10-12 et Ultimate End #1-5

== See also ==
- Marvel Epic Collection
- Marvel Omnibus
- Marvel Gallery Editions
- Marvel Complete Collections
- Marvel Masterworks
- Essential Marvel
- Daredevil collected editions
- Spider-Man collected editions
- DC Finest trade paperbacks
- DC Compact Comics
