= Gabriele Dell'Otto =

Italian illustrator and author (born 1973)

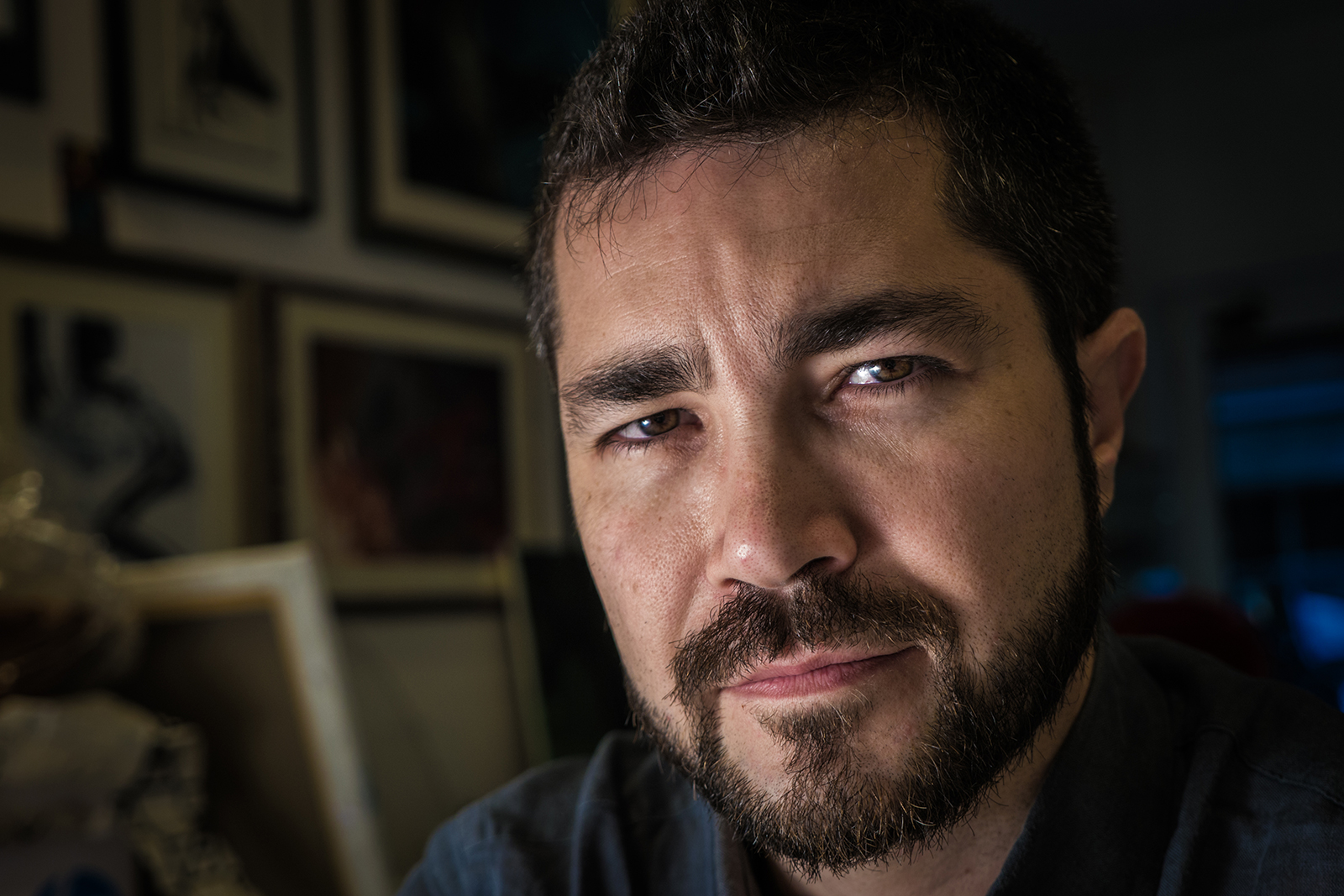
- Dell'Otto in 2014
- Born: December 20, 1973 (age 52) Rome, Italy
- Area: Artist
- Notable works: Secret War

Gabriele Dell'Otto (born December 20, 1973) is an Italian illustrator and author whose works have been published in several countries in the fields of scientific illustration, comic books, calendars, lithographs, books, colored graphic folders, and cover work for magazines and video games.

== Early life ==
Dell'Otto was born December 20, 1973, in Rome. He received a diploma in artistic maturity and registered in the European Design Institute.

== Career ==
In 1998, Dell'Otto started collaborating with the European division of Marvel Comics, producing covers, posters and lithographies for Italy, France and Germany. In Germany he started collaborating with DC Comics and other publishers such as IPP, Egmont Ehapa and MG Publishing.

In 2002 and 2003, the Italian Carabinieri hired him to design the images for their historical calendar.

In 2002, his work was shown to Joe Quesada, the editor-in-chief of Marvel Comics, who assigned him the art duties for the Secret War mini-series, written by Brian Michael Bendis.

In 2006, he illustrated the cover and promotional images of the Italian version of the Activision videogame Marvel: Ultimate Alliance.

Between 2006 and 2007, Dell'Otto provided the covers of the miniseries Annihilation, which starred the space-based characters of the Marvel Universe. In May 2007, he published the illustrated book Tales.

In 2009, he was the artist of the X-Force mini-series Sex and Violence, written by Craig Kyle and Christopher Yost.

In January 2012, Dell'Otto illustrated the spine images for the books in The Official Marvel Graphic Novel Collection. When put together in order, the spines form a complete landscape image. In November, Dell'Otto penciled issues #14–15 of the Marvel ongoing series Avenging Spider-Man. He then drew issues #1 of One-shot Amazing Spider-Man: Family Business. In 2020, Dell'Otto drew the 1990s variant cover for The Joker 80th anniversary 100-page super spectacular #1.

Dell'Otto created the poster for the American TV series Agents of S.H.I.E.L.D. episode "Aftershocks".

== Bibliography ==
=== Interior art ===
- Secret War #1–5 (2004)
- Secret War: From the Files of Nick Fury#1 (2005)
- Ultimate Marvel Sampler #1 (2007)
- X-Force: Sex and Violence #1–3 (2010)
- Origins of Marvel Comics: X-Men #1 (2010)
- Avengers Annual #1 (2012)
- New Avengers Annual #1 (2011)
- Avenging Spider-Man #14–15 (2012)
- Amazing Spider-Man: Family Business #1 (2014)

=== Cover work ===
Annihilation Prologue vol.1 #1 (2006)

- Annihilation #1–6 (2006)
- Annihilation: Nova #1–4 (2006)
- Annihilation: Silver Surfer #1–4 (2006)
- Annihilation: Ronan #1–4 (2006)
- Annihilation: Super-Skrull #1–4 (2006)
- Annihilation: Heralds of Galactus #1–2 (2007)
- What If? Annihilation #1 (2007)
- The Deadly Hands of Kung Fu Omnibus #1 (2016)
- The New Avengers: Illuminati #1 (2006)
- Fantastic Four vol.3 #56 (2002)
- X-Factor vol.3 #6 (2006)
- Ghost Rider vol.6 #12–13 (2007)
- Daredevil vol.1 #500 (2009)
- Fantastic Four vol.1 #600 (2011)
- Silver Surfer: In Thy Name vol.1 #2 (2008)
- Invincible Iron Man vol.2 #4 (2008)
- Winter Soldier vol.1 #1 (2011)
- New Avengers Annual vol.2 #1 (2011)
- New Avengers vol.3 #24, 29, 33 (2014–2015)
- Avengers Annual vol.4 #1 (2012)
- Avenging Spider-Man vol.1 #14–15 (2013)
- Amazing Spider-Man: Family Business vol.1 #1 (2014)
- Captain America: Steve Rogers vol.1 #15 (2017)
- Captain America and Hawkeye vol.1 #629 (2012)
- Morbius: The Living Vampire vol.2 #1 (2013)
- Moon Knight vol.5 #26–30 (2009)
- Dark Tower: Treachery vol.1 #1 (2008)
- All-New Miracleman Annual vol.1 #1 (2014)
- The Pulse vol.1 #2 (2004)
- Gorilla Man vol.1 #3 (2010)
- X-Force: Sex and Violence vol.1 #1–3 (2010)
- Ultimate Origins vol.1 #1–5 (2008)
- Ultimate Fantastic Four vol.1 #53 (2008)
- Ultimate X-Men vol.1 #94–97 (2008)
- Marvel 1602: Fantastick Four vol.1 #2–5 (2006)
- Secret War vol.1 #1–5 (2004)
- Secret Invasion Prologue (2008)
- Secret Invasion #1–8 (2008)
- What If? Secret Invasion #1 (2009)
- Siege #1–4 (2010)
- Fear Itself: FF #1 (2011)
- Fear Itself: Hulk vs. Dracula #1–3 (2011)
- Vengeance vol.1 #1-6 (2011)
- X-23 vol.3 #1 (variant cover, 2010)
- The Dark Knight III: The Master Race #1, 3 4–8 (variant cover, 2015–2017)
- Clone Conspiracy #1-5 (2016)
- Batman #1, 75–76 (variant cover, 2016)
- Dark Nights: Metal #5 (variant cover, 2018)
- Batman Who Laughs: The Grim Knight #1 (variant cover, 2019)
- Detective Comics #1000, 1027 (variant cover, 2019, 2020)
- The Joker 80th anniversary 100-page super spectacular #1 (variant cover) (2020)
- X-Men #49] (Marvel France) (2002)
- Phoenix Resurrection: The Return of Jean Grey #1 (2018)
