= Secret War (comics) =

2004–2005 Marvel Comics storyline

- Captain America as featured on the cover of Secret War #3. Art by Gabriele Dell'Otto.

Publication information
- Publisher: Marvel Comics
- Format: Limited series
- Genre: Superhero
- Publication date: February 2004 – December 2005
- No. of issues: 5

Creative team
- Written by: Brian Michael Bendis
- Artist: Gabriele Dell'Otto

Secret War is a 2004–2005 comic book storyline published by Marvel Comics, consisting of a central, five-issue miniseries written by Brian Michael Bendis and illustrated by Gabriele Dell'Otto, and a number of tie-in books. It is loosely based on classified operations told to Bendis by an anonymous high-ranking officer in the United States Intelligence Community during Bendis' childhood.

The storyline involves a large-scale super-hero crossover featuring Marvel characters such as Spider-Man, Captain America, Wolverine, Daredevil, Luke Cage and Nick Fury fighting a wide array of supervillains who have received hi-tech armaments from a mysterious benefactor.

The first issue was published in April 2004, and though intended originally as a bimonthly publication, it faced long delays. It was completed with issue five's publication in December 2005.

The aftermath of the series was explored in stories in The Pulse and Bendis has gone on to use many of the same characters in his New Avengers titles. This event begins an eight-year-long series of cross-over events ending with Avengers vs. X-Men.

The storyline in Secret War is unrelated to the original Secret Wars and Secret Wars II crossover limited series which Marvel published in the mid-1980s, although its title is clearly inspired by them. Those stories received their own spiritual successor in Beyond!, published in 2006.

Bendis has noted that Secret War is connected to the "Secret Invasion" storyline, in which Skrulls have infiltrated several institutions of Earth.

== Synopsis ==
Nick Fury, Director of the international security force S.H.I.E.L.D., uncovers a secret plot by Latverian Prime Minister Lucia von Bardas to fund a group of B-List supervillains with advanced technology, presumably that of previous Latverian dictator Doctor Doom (who was trapped in Hell at the time), as a means of wreaking terror on American soil. Fury immediately takes his findings to the President of the United States but is denied the authorization requested to overthrow the post-Doom Latverian government due to its sponsorship by the U.S. Government. Fury is enraged at what he sees as the same pre-9/11 security complacency inviting disaster yet again.

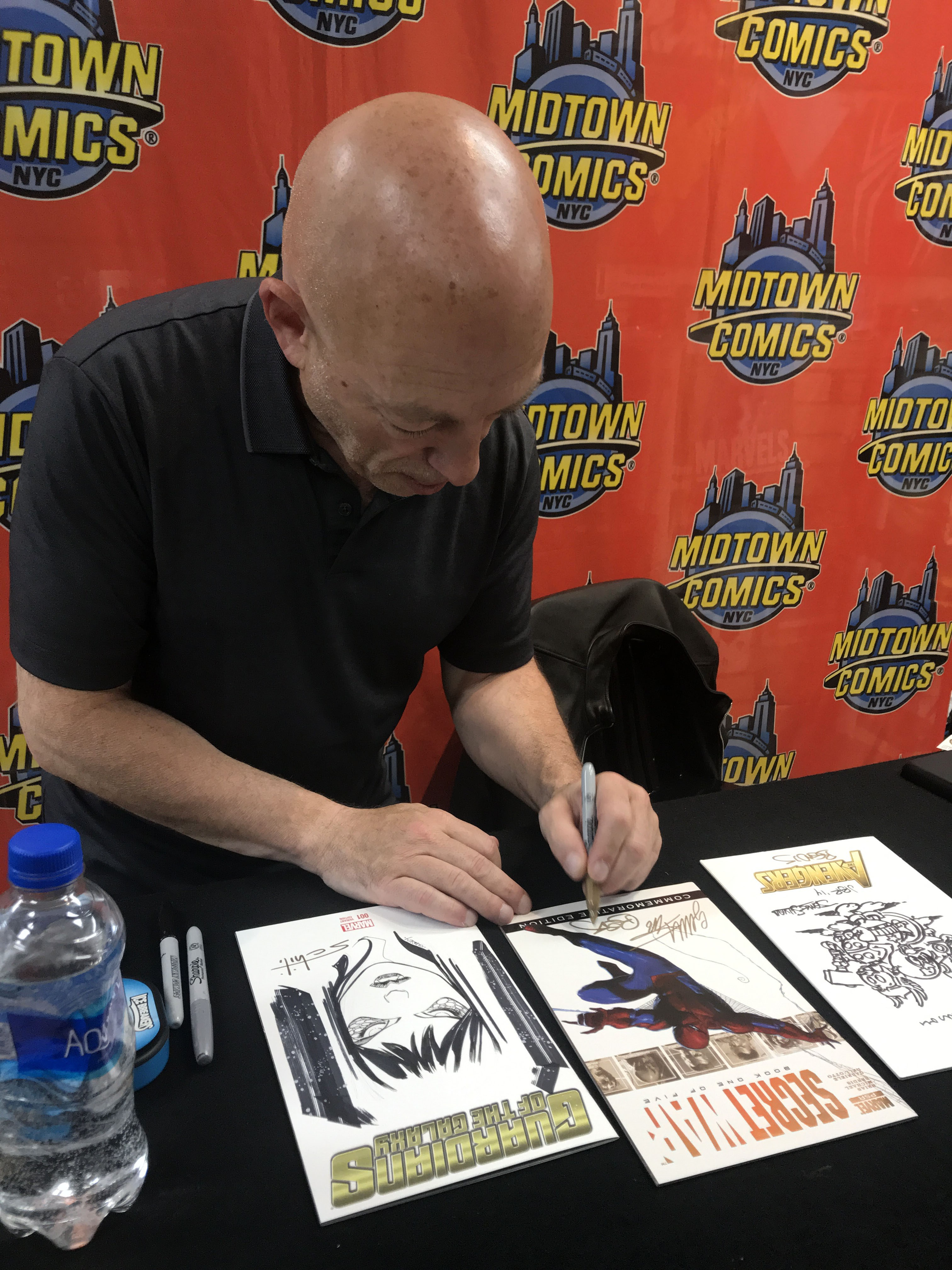
Writer Brian Michael Bendis signing a copy of the central miniseries at Midtown Comics in Manhattan.

Fury recruits Captain America, Spider-Man, Daredevil, Black Widow, Luke Cage, Wolverine, and superhuman S.H.I.E.L.D. agent Daisy Johnson in a private attempt to covertly overthrow Latveria.

A year later, a mass reprisal is unleashed across New York City, leaving Luke Cage in a coma as Fury and a cadre of NYC heroes face off against a cyborg Von Bardas and her hi-tech army. The reprisal is revealed to be a trap for New York's superheroes when Von Bardas arms a high-tech bomb linked to the technology provided to her supervillain army.

The cyborg Von Bardas is destroyed by Daisy Johnson, the bomb is disarmed, and the supervillain army is defeated and arrested. Captain America immediately demands answers from Nick Fury about what happened. They are soon joined by the X-Men and Wolverine, who attacks Fury until Johnson informs him that the man before him is a Life Model Decoy, and that the real Fury already departed. Through the L.M.D., Fury reveals the invasion of Latveria and the fact that the heroes (with the exceptions of S.H.I.E.L.D. agents Black Widow and Daisy Johnson) were brainwashed afterward. Nick Fury then informs the heroes that this is the last time they will see him and that he hopes those involved in his plot will understand that what he did was necessary.

His replacement as Director of S.H.I.E.L.D., Maria Hill, discovers the particulars of the story through her interrogation of Agent Johnson in the present-day framing device of the story.

== Cast ==
=== Heroes ===
- S.H.I.E.L.D.
  - Nick Fury
  - Nick Fury L.M.D.
  - Black Widow
  - Daisy Johnson
- Captain America
- Hawkeye
- Spider-Man
- Daredevil
- Luke Cage
- X-Men
  - Beast
  - Cyclops
  - Emma Frost
  - Shadowcat
  - Wolverine
- Fantastic Four
  - Mister Fantastic
  - Invisible Woman
  - Human Torch
  - Thing

=== Supervillains ===
- Lucia von Bardas
- Boomerang
- Constrictor
- Crimson Dynamo
- Crossfire
- Diamondback (Rachel Leighton)
- Eel
- Goldbug
- Grim Reaper
- Hobgoblin
- Jack O'Lantern
- Killer Shrike
- King Cobra
- Lady Octopus
- Mentallo
- Mister Fear (Alan Fagan)
- Scorcher
- Scorpion (Mac Gargan)
- Shocker
- Spider-Slayer
- Tinkerer
- Trapster
- Wizard

== Collected editions ==
Title	Material collected	Format	Pages	Released	ISBN
Secret War	Secret War #1-5; From The Files Of Nick Fury	OHC	256	8 Mar 2006	978-0785118374
Secret War	Secret War #1-5; From The Files Of Nick Fury	TPB	256	22 Nov 2006	978-0785113317
Secret War	Secret War #1-5; From The Files Of Nick Fury	TPB	256	30 Sep 2009	978-0785142287
Secret War	Secret War #1-5; Pulse #6-9; From The Files Of Nick Fury	Omnibus	368	1 Apr 2025	Classic costume cover: 978-1302963828
Secret War	Secret War #1-5; Pulse #6-9; From The Files Of Nick Fury	Omnibus	368	1 Apr 2025	Secret War costume DM cover: 978-1302963835

=== Tie-ins ===
In addition to the main five-issue series, there were a few other comics that tied in with the storyline. Secret War: From the Files of Nick Fury was a handbook-style one-off publication that featured S.H.I.E.L.D. profiles of all the main characters, written by Mike Raicht. These profiles are presented with the five issues in the Secret War hardback and paperback collections, and include a list of heroes that Fury recommended be sent in if his stealth attack failed and a large-scale assault was required (Hawkeye, Spider-Woman, Punisher, Ms. Marvel, War Machine, the Hulk and the Sentry), and a list of heroes who Fury contemplated including in the original mission but rejected for various reasons (Cyclops relied on his team too much, Fury had doubts about Doc Samson's ability to come through in a crunch, the Falcon lacked the right kind of power, Iron Man would ask too many questions even without the issue of bringing in someone who relied that heavily on technology against the Tinkerer, the Thing was too visually distinctive, Kitty Pryde lacked the right mentality, and Fury couldn't trust Mystique or the Purple Man).

The Pulse #6–9 featured an original storyline which runs parallel to and intersects with the main series (it was meant to last five issues but when the last two issues of the mini-series were delayed Bendis decided to remove some content from the tie-in in lieu of spoiling the main event). This storyline was collected separately in its own paperback (The Pulse Volume 2: Secret War). Bendis has also stated that part of the Secret Invasion storyline has its beginnings in the Secret War publications, as he had been planning that event for several years.

== In other media ==
The video game Marvel: Ultimate Alliance 2 begins its story with the events depicted in the "Secret War" story arc of the Marvel Universe. It starts from the attack on Castle Doom to Lucia Von Bardas' defeat, but there are key differences. While Fury, Captain America, Spider-Man and Wolverine are involved like in the comic, Iron Man appears and serves as a substitute for Daredevil and by extension Luke Cage, while Black Widow only plays a communicative role guiding the heroes and aiding Fury, and Daisy Johnson does not appear. From there the story follows the "Civil War" story arc which is also connected with Bardas' bomb attack on New York causing casualties. The Secret War costumes for Wolverine, Luke Cage and Daredevil appear as alternate costumes.

Spider-Man's Secret War costume appears as an alternate costume in Spider-Man: Shattered Dimensions and Marvel's Spider-Man.
