= Marvel's Spider-Man: The City That Never Sleeps =

Downloadable content for 2018's Spider-Man

- Developer: Insomniac Games (Note: Windows version developed by Nixxes Software)
- Publisher: Sony Interactive Entertainment
- Directors: Ryan Smith; Brian Horton; Bryan Intihar; Marcus Smith
- Programmer: Joe Valenzuela
- Artists: Jacinda Chew; Grant Hollis
- Writers: Jon Paquette; Benjamin Arfmann; Kelsey Beachum
- Composer: John Paesano
- Series: Marvel's Spider-Man
- Platforms: PlayStation 4; PlayStation 5; Windows
- Release: PlayStation 4: The Heist; October 23, 2018; Turf Wars; November 20, 2018; Silver Lining; December 21, 2018; PlayStation 5: November 12, 2020; Windows: August 12, 2022
- Genre: Action-adventure
- Mode: Single-player

Marvel's Spider-Man: The City That Never Sleeps is a collection of downloadable content (DLC) developed by Insomniac Games and published by Sony Interactive Entertainment for the 2018 video game Marvel's Spider-Man. Based on the Marvel Comics superhero Spider-Man, it is inspired by the character's long-running comic book mythology and adaptations in other media. Released in three distinct chapters, The Heist, Turf Wars, and Silver Lining, the DLC serves as an epilogue to the main game taking place three months following its conclusion and follows Spider-Man as he contends with a new crime wave led by the physically enhanced mob boss Hammerhead.

The game is presented from the third-person perspective with a primary focus on Spider-Man's traversal and combat abilities. Spider-Man can freely move around New York City, interacting with characters and undertaking missions, and unlocking new gadgets and suits by progressing through the main story or completing tasks. The player is able to complete side missions away from the main story to unlock additional content and collectible items. Combat focuses on chaining attacks together against numerous foes while avoiding damage, using the environment and webs to incapacitate foes.

The City That Never Sleeps was released monthly for the PlayStation 4, from October to December 2018, and received generally positive reviews from critics. The base game and The City That Never Sleeps content were collected together and released as Marvel's Spider-Man Remastered in November 2020 for PlayStation 5, bundled with the Ultimate Edition of Marvel's Spider-Man: Miles Morales for the console; it was later made available as a standalone release. A port of Remastered for Windows was released for Steam and Epic Games Store in August 2022, developed by Nixxes Software.

The DLC features a dedication to Spider-Man co-creator Stan Lee, who died shortly before the release of the second chapter.

== Gameplay ==
The City That Never Sleeps requires the base Marvel's Spider-Man game to be played. It is accessed from the main menu and takes place in a separate instance of New York City, excluding the main game's story, side missions, and random crimes; certain facilities, such as Otto Octavius's lab and the F.E.A.S.T. shelter, are also no longer accessible. Instead of the random street crimes from the base game, the DLC introduces crimes committed by the Maggia crime families, including Maggia hideouts, brawls, and crime scenes. In Turf Wars and Silver Lining, the Maggia have stolen technology from Silver Sable's mercenary organisation, Sable International, to improve their fighting capabilities. As such, the DLC introduces new enemy types, including gatling gun- or jetpack-wielding mobsters.

Much of the DLC's side content revolves around the social media-using villain Screwball, who returns from the base game to deliver various challenges, including EMP challenges, defeating enemies in certain areas to earn points, defeating enemies using specific gadgets, and taking stylish photos of Spider-Man's web-slinging or combat to achieve higher scores. Other side missions include looking for stolen pieces of art that former thief and Black Cat's father Walter Hardy hid around the city, and using Spider-Bots to look for bombs hidden under cars. Each episode introduces new story missions, Screwball challenges, enemies types, and trophies.

== Synopsis ==
=== Characters ===
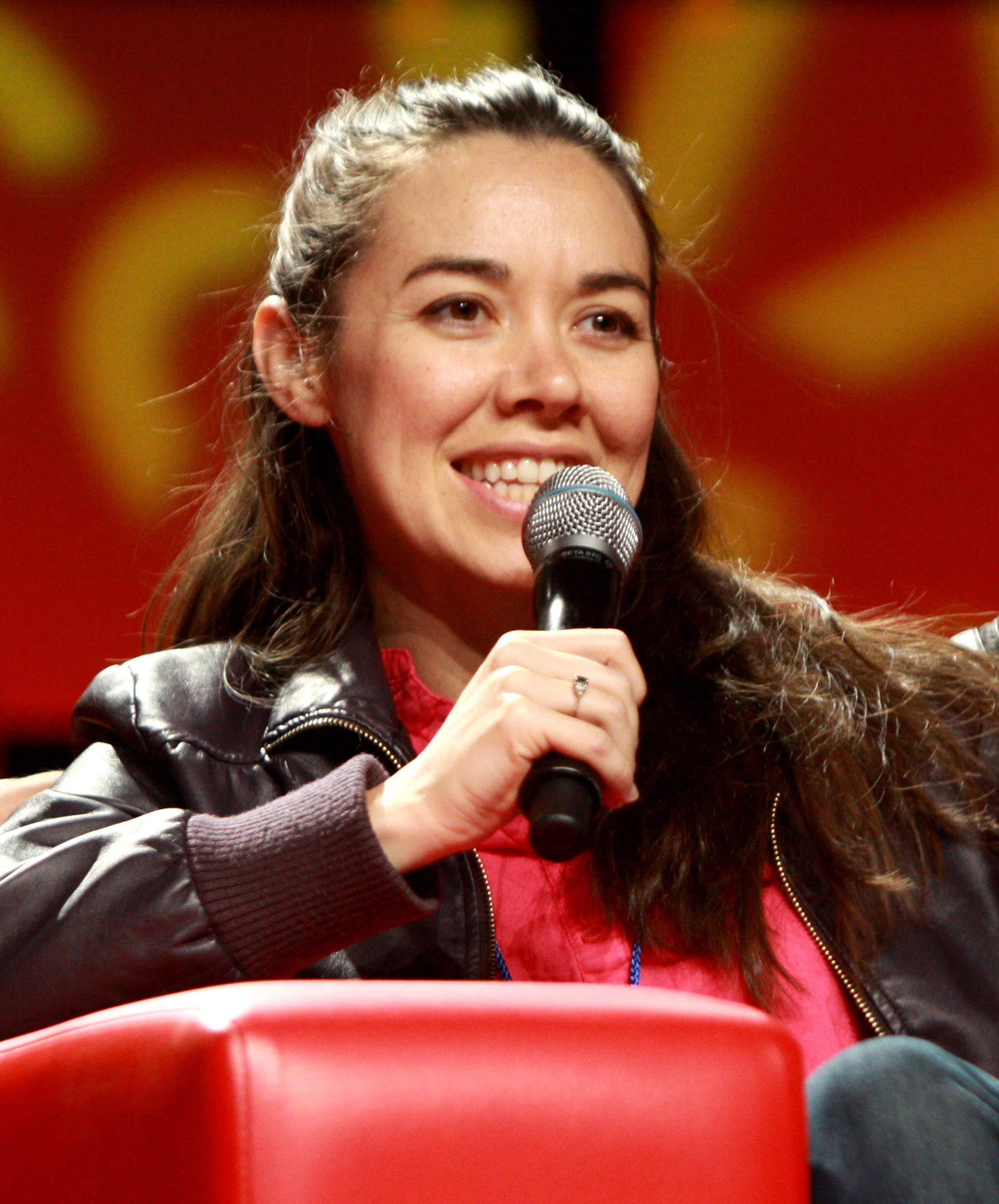
Tara Platt in 2013

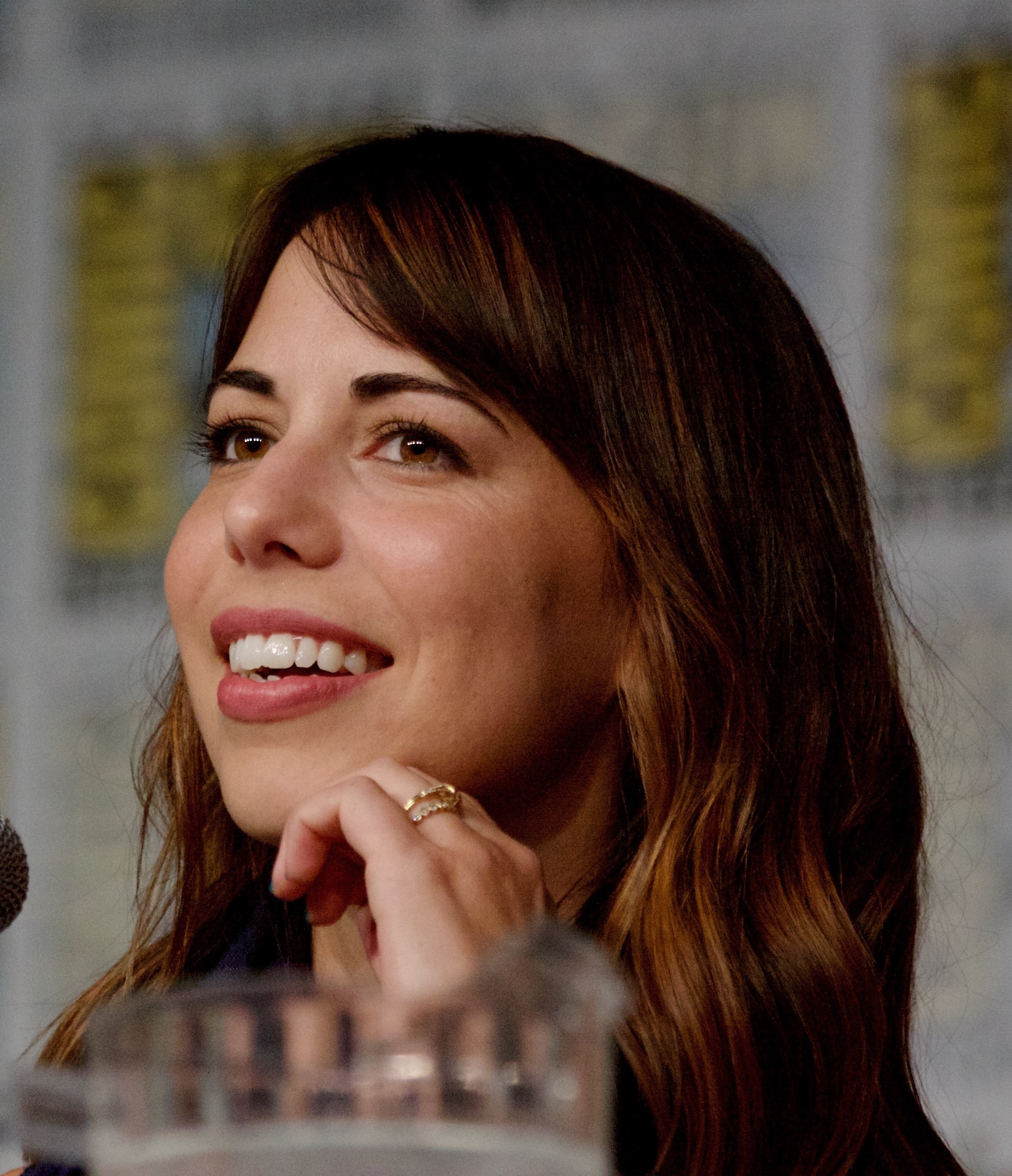
Laura Bailey in 2016

Platt and Bailey voiced Yuri Watanabe and Mary Jane Watson, respectively.

Marvel's Spider-Man: The City That Never Sleeps features a large ensemble cast of characters from the history of Spider-Man comics. Peter Parker (voiced by Yuri Lowenthal) is a 23-year old former research assistant, who gained superhuman abilities after being bitten by a genetically modified spider. Employing a secret identity, Parker uses these abilities to protect the citizens of New York City as the superhero Spider-Man. Taking place shortly after the main story of Marvel's Spider-Man, The City That Never Sleeps finds Parker struggling to come to terms with the loss of his Aunt May to a bioweapon released by his former friend and mentor turned villain, the now-imprisoned Dr. Otto Octavius. Parker has romantically reunited with his ex-girlfriend Mary Jane Watson (Laura Bailey), a reporter for the Daily Bugle recently promoted to associate editor, who frequently aids in his Spider-Man activities. Parker has also reluctantly begun mentoring Miles Morales (Nadji Jeter) after the latter was also bitten by a genetically modified spider and gained powers similar to his.

The City That Never Sleeps introduces Parker's former lover and master-thief Black Cat / Felicia Hardy (Erica Lindbeck, who has a voice-only role as part of a side quest in the main game), Felicia's father and retired thief Walter Hardy (Daniel Riordan), and mob boss Hammerhead (Keith Silverstein), who is taking advantage of the power vacuum left by the absence of villains to try and seize control of the city's criminal underworld from the other Maggia crime families. It also features several returning characters from the base game, including reporter J Jonah Jameson (Darin De Paul: voice only role), NYPD Captain and Spider-Man's ally Yuri Watanabe (Tara Platt), the head of the private military company Sable International, Silver Sablinova (Nichole Elise), and the social media-using villain Screwball (Stephanie Lemelin), who has escaped from prison.

=== Plot ===
==== The Heist ====
A few months after the events of the main game, the Maggia crime families are looking to fill the void in New York's criminal underworld left by Wilson Fisk's capture and Martin Li's defeat and disappearance. While trying to stop one of the families from stealing a painting on display at the Manhattan Museum of Contemporary Art, Spider-Man encounters Black Cat, who breaks the painting in half and steals a USB drive hidden within the frame before escaping. Mary Jane later informs him that Hammerhead's family is in possession of the drive, implying Black Cat is working for them. Spider-Man pursues Black Cat as she steals more of the drives, ultimately catching her, and she reveals that Hammerhead is forcing her to help him by holding her son hostage. Suspecting himself to be the father, Spider-Man agrees to help rescue the boy.

Meanwhile, Mary Jane learns that the drives contain the Maggia families' collective fortune and that Hammerhead has recently purchased a sizeable impregnable vault that could be used to hold Black Cat's son. Spider-Man and Black Cat infiltrate the warehouse where the vault is kept. Searching the shipping containers, Spider-Man learns that Hammerhead and his gang have been stealing impounded weapons and equipment from Sable International left behind after the Devil's Breath crisis to gain an advantage in the gang war. As Spider-Man searches for Black Cat at the vault, the latter betrays and locks the former inside, revealing that she lied about having a son to persuade him into helping her break into the vault, which contains the final drive: Hammerhead's. She has kept the drives for herself, so she could use the wealth to disappear. The drives she gave to Hammerhead were fakes. As Spider-Man escapes, he overhears Hammerhead ordering his goons to kill Black Cat for her betrayal. Spider-Man attempts to warn Black Cat, but arrives too late and watches as she is seemingly killed when explosives planted in her penthouse detonate. Later, Peter tells Mary Jane that Felicia's body wasn't found among the wreckage and that he is relieved not to be a father, though Mary Jane reassures him that he would make a great one someday, at the right time and with the right person.

==== Turf Wars ====
Shortly after the supposed death of Black Cat, a full-blown gang war between the Maggia families erupts, with Hammerhead's forces now armed with Sable weaponry. Spider-Man assists Yuri Watanabe and her police task force in a raid against Hammerhead, but it turns out to be a trap, leaving only Spider-Man and Yuri alive. The loss of her men under her watch leaves Yuri emotionally compromised, and Spider-Man asks her to take a leave of absence to grieve and recover, promising to apprehend Hammerhead on his own. After abducting the other Maggia Dons, Hammerhead's forces attack police convoys across the city. While Spider-Man is dealing with them, Hammerhead attacks the police precinct, which is holding Sable International's "Project Olympus", killing numerous police officers in the process.

Frustrated by her men's deaths and Spider-Man's lack of progress, an enraged Yuri decides to go after Hammerhead alone, threatening to arrest Spider-Man if he interferes. She then brutally kills many Maggia henchmen at the Bar With No Name. With Mary Jane's help, Spider-Man discovers that Yuri is a third-generation NYPD officer whose father was arrested for taking bribes from Hammerhead and that she has spent her entire career moving precincts to take him down due to her vendetta. When Hammerhead later attempts to terrorize New York into submission by executing the Maggia Dons on live television, Spider-Man foils his plan and defeats him, despite Hammerhead sporting the stolen Project Olympus, which is revealed to be an experimental exosuit. However, before Hammerhead can be taken into police custody, a vengeful Yuri arrives, who ensnares Spider-Man and seemingly shoots Hammerhead dead. While being taken to the morgue, Hammerhead is resuscitated with a taser by one of his henchmen who infiltrated the ambulance, allowing him to continue terrorizing New York.

==== Silver Lining ====
Following her dismissal from the police force, Yuri has become a ruthless vigilante, tracking down and executing numerous Maggia gangsters. Meanwhile, with Sable International's advanced equipment and weaponry, Hammerhead's gang rules over the city. Mary Jane learns that Project Olympus was a Sable-Oscorp funded initiative, using bio-enhancement technology to create Super Soldiers using experimental exosuits. Learning of this, an enraged Silver Sablinova returns to take revenge on Hammerhead for stealing her equipment, which she needs for a civil war in her home country of Symkaria. Worried that Sablinova's violent methods would result in more chaos, Spider-Man tries to convince her to work together. Hammerhead, who has now augmented himself into a cyborg, leads Spider-Man and Sablinova into a trap and overpowers them. Black Cat, who is revealed to have faked her death, arrives to save Spider-Man, though Hammerhead kidnaps Sablinova. Apologizing for her actions, Black Cat gives Spider-Man a USB containing information on Hammerhead's weaknesses before disappearing again.

Spider-Man saves Sablinova in a sewer hideout and they learn from Felicia's USB that the carbon steel plate inside Hammerhead's head is sensitive to heat. Sablinova takes Spider-Man to her stealth carrier on the Hudson River, and they prepare a trap for Hammerhead, outfitting Sablinova's VTOL fighter jet with a heated laser array just before Hammerhead arrives and begins his attack. While Spider-Man holds Hammerhead in place, Sablinova blasts his metal plate, weakening him, and crashes her jet into him. With Hammerhead finally subdued, Sablinova reclaims her supplies and returns to Symkaria, telling Spider-Man he inspired her to be more heroic. Meanwhile, Mary Jane also leaves for Symkaria to write a story on the war there and raise awareness while Peter begins to train Miles Morales on how to use his newly acquired powers, preparing him to become the new Spider-Man.

== Release ==
The first episode, The Heist, was released on October 23, 2018. Set several months after the end of the main game, the story follows the physical return of Spider-Man's ex-girlfriend Black Cat to New York for a heist, which draws him into conflict with the Maggia crime families. The Heist DLC expansion includes three unlockable costumes: Spider-UK, Scarlet Spider IV (dubbed as Scarlet Spider II in-game), and the Resilient Suit, an original design by artist Gabriele Dell'Otto.

The second episode, Turf Wars was released on November 20. The story follows Spider-Man's and his ally Yuri Watanabe's efforts to stop Hammerhead from taking over the Maggia crime families, and seizing control of crime in New York. Turf Wars includes three new costumes: Mangaverse Spider-Man, (dubbed as Spider-Clan suit in-game), the original Iron Spider, and the Spider Armor MK I.

The final episode, Silver Lining, was released on December 21. Its story features Silver Sable's return to New York City to reclaim her technology that has been stolen by the Maggia. She teams up with Spider-Man to confront Hammerhead, who has used her technology to make himself virtually indestructible. Silver Lining adds three new costumes: Into the Spider-Verse (based on the concurrently released film), Cyborg Spider-Man, and the Spider-Man armor created by Aaron Aikman, an alternate version of Spider-Man.

The "Digital Deluxe" version includes access to The City That Never Sleeps' three story-based DLC chapters. The Collector's Edition includes The City That Never Sleeps DLC.

The City That Never Sleeps is included as part of Marvel's Spider-Man Remastered for the PlayStation 5 and Windows.

== Other media ==
The events of The City That Never Sleeps were adapted into a five-issue comic miniseries, titled Marvel's Spider-Man: The Black Cat Strikes, released in 2020. The comic features additional story scenes not depicted in the downloadable content that expand on Spider-Man and Black Cat's relationship, including flashbacks to their previous partnership prior to the events of the game, and an epilogue showing Black Cat's recapture by Spider-Man.

== Reception ==
Aggregate review scores
Game	Metacritic
The Heist	76/100
Turf Wars	70/100
Silver Lining	75/100

The City That Never Sleeps received generally positive reviews from critics and journalists. Critics called The Heist, the first piece of the three-part DLC saga, a "fantastic continuation" of the core game, praising its character work and story missions. However, critics noted that its gameplay, particularly the side objectives, felt "fun but repetitive", describing the DLC as "more of the same", but enjoying the story nonetheless despite its short length.
