= Marvel's Spider-Man =

Video game series developed by Insomniac Games

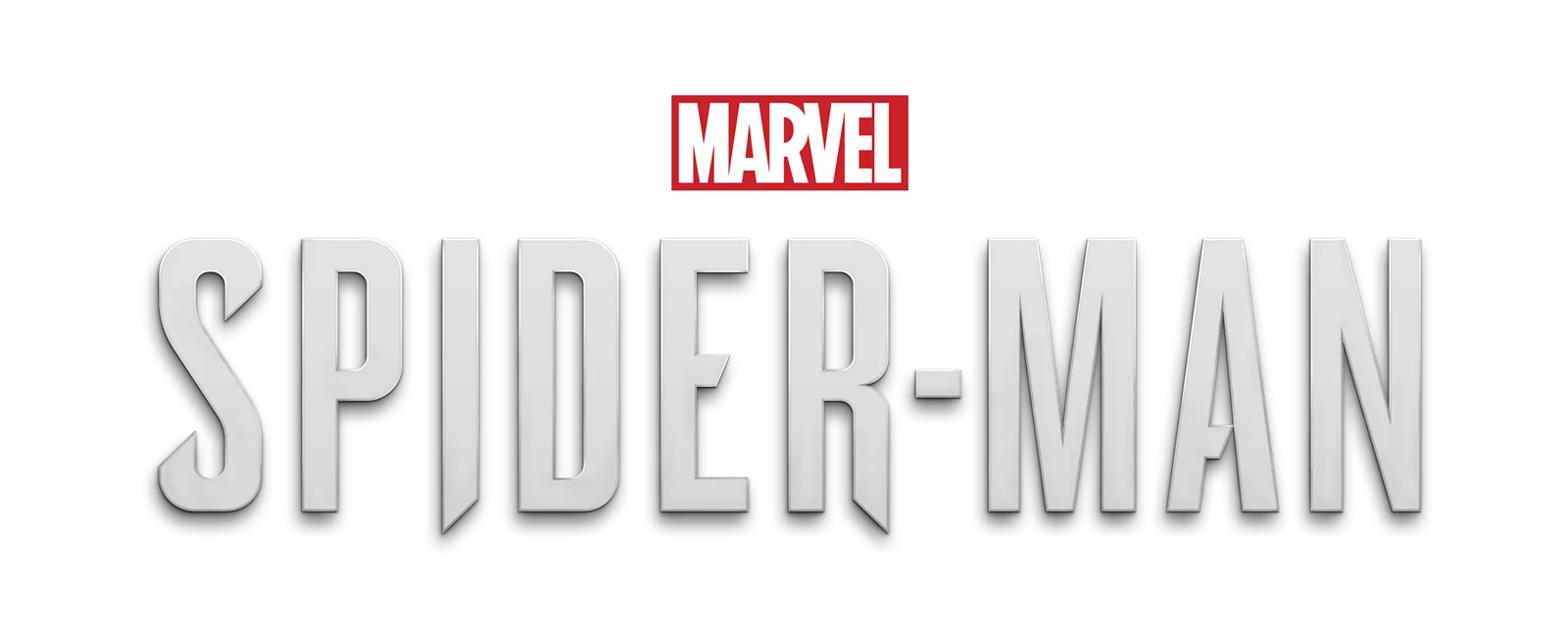
- Genre: Action-adventure
- Developer: Insomniac Games (Note: Windows versions ported by Nixxes Software)
- Publisher: Sony Interactive Entertainment
- Artist: Grant Hollis
- Writers: Jon Paquette; Benjamin Arfmann; Kelsey Beachum; Christos Gage; Nick Folkman; Max Folkman; Lauren Mee; Brittney Morris; Jamie Meyer; Mary Kenney; Walt Williams
- Composer: John Paesano
- Platforms: PlayStation 4; PlayStation 5; Windows
- First release: Marvel's Spider-Man; September 7, 2018
- Latest release: Marvel's Wolverine; September 15, 2026
- Parent series: Spider-Man video games

Marvel's Spider-Man is a series of superhero action-adventure video games, media franchise, and shared universe developed by Insomniac Games and published by Sony Interactive Entertainment (SIE) for PlayStation consoles and Windows. Based on characters appearing in Marvel Comics publications, the games are inspired by the long-running comic book lore, while additionally deriving from various adaptations in other media. The series principally follows the main protagonists Peter Parker and Miles Morales who fight crime in New York City as dual bearers of the eponymous superhero persona Spider-Men while dealing with the complications of their civilian lives.

Marvel Games entered negotiations with SIE regarding developing third party games based on their characters, leading to frequent collaborative studio Insomniac Games being selected to acquire the license for the Spider-Man character from Activision in 2014. The series began with Marvel's Spider-Man and its subsequent downloadable content (DLC) expansion The City That Never Sleeps, which was released on the PlayStation 4 in late 2018; the game and its DLC were later collected together and released as a remastered version for the PlayStation 5 in November 2020 and Windows in August 2022. A direct spin-off title, Marvel's Spider-Man: Miles Morales, was released on the PlayStation 4 and PlayStation 5 in November 2020 alongside Marvel's Spider-Man Remastered, with a Windows port released in November 2022. A sequel to the original game and the Miles Morales spin-off, Marvel's Spider-Man 2, was released for the PlayStation 5 in October 2023, and for Windows in January 2025. A third entry, Marvel's Spider-Man 3, is in development.

The series is set in a shared universe in a similar fashion to the Marvel Universe of the comic books, being supported by other standalone games developed by Insomniac Games that share continuity with the studio's Spider-Man titles. Marvel's Wolverine, a game focused on the titular character, released in September 2026 for PlayStation 5. A standalone Venom game (Note: Various different titles for the Venom game appear in the files published during the 2023 Insomniac Games ransomware attack, including Marvel's Venom, Marvel's Venom: Lethal Protector and Marvel's Spider-Man: Venom. An official title was not yet announced.) following his appearance in Marvel's Spider-Man 2, is currently in development. Marvel's X-Men, a game focusing on the team of the same name, is planned.

The currently released main entries in the Marvel's Spider-Man series have been met with positive commercial success and critical acclaim, with praise for their narratives, characters, world design, voice acting, graphics, and gameplay. Various tie-in novels by Titan Books and comic books published by Marvel Comics have been released, expanding the games' universe. Insomniac's version of Peter Parker also appears in the comic book event Spider-Geddon (2018), which designated the series as taking place on "Earth-1048" in the larger Marvel Comics multiverse. Parker also makes a cameo appearance in the animated film Spider-Man: Across the Spider-Verse (2023), with Yuri Lowenthal briefly reprising his role.

== Conception and development ==
Video games featuring Marvel Comics characters were primarily developed and published by Activision since 1998, with the character Spider-Man appearing in multiple titles both as the primary playable character and as a supporting character since 2000. However, as Marvel Games vice president Jay Ong would come to reflect on in 2016, the terms of Marvel and Activision's deal necessitated quicker development periods on games in order to tie such products into upcoming films based around Marvel properties. Ong would reminisce about how it was "difficult to succeed" under those circumstances as a result of instances where "there wasn't enough time to come out with something truly terrific". Dissatisfied with the eventual output of the publisher, Marvel Games would elect to terminate their partnership with Activision in 2014 just prior to the release of the movie tie-in game, The Amazing Spider-Man 2. During a meeting with executives from the publishing firm, Ong would be asked by Activision, "What are you going to do with this IP after you get it back?". Ong would cite a need to "find a better home for it" in response, with the publisher's representative taunting him in return, "Good luck finding your unicorn".

To rejuvenate the IP, Ong's primary objective was to find "a publishing partner who hadn't adopted the "crappy licensed games" mentality", as well as one with "a vested interest that would benefit from building a franchise". In particular, Marvel Games were looking to create a gaming IP around one of their characters that would rival the likes of the Batman: Arkham series from WB Games and Rocksteady Studios, credited with legitimizing and popularizing video game adaptations based on comic book characters. The primary candidates considered for spearheading Marvel's new commitment to AAA games were Microsoft Studios, Sony Interactive Entertainment and Nintendo. Nintendo was ruled out initially as a result of the technical limitations of the Nintendo Switch as well as the publisher's perceived dedication to pursuing games using their own characters and franchises (though they would eventually collaborate with Marvel in developing Marvel Ultimate Alliance 3: The Black Order (2019) for Nintendo Switch), while Microsoft turned down Marvel's offer due to a desire to focus on building their own IP (They would later collaborate with Marvel on producing the upcoming Marvel's Blade through publisher Bethesda Softworks). Eventually, Jay Ong would meet with Sony executives Adam Boyes and John Drake, in order to pitch an overall development deal with Marvel, with the hope that they could collaborate and "beat Arkham and have one game at least and maybe multiple games that could drive adoption", of Sony's PlayStation platforms.

SIE eventually signed off on the deal, prompting their Vice President of Product Development Connie Booth to visit developer Insomniac Games in order to speak with studio CEO Ted Price, with discussions about the potential Marvel project being held off-the-record. Price was described as being "fairly neutral" towards the prospects of developing a game based on a Marvel Comics property, as Insomniac up to that point purely worked on their own original franchises, but his development team were comparatively enthusiastic about the project. As Marvel allowed Insomniac to select any of their characters to adapt, the team decided on Spider-Man as a result of being able to relate to the dynamic presented between the heroic Spider-Man and his everyman alter-ego, Peter Parker. They would also come to find the task of adapting the character daunting, as a result of his popularity, in addition to the numerous existing stories and interpretations of the character both in comics and in other media. However, they also welcomed the challenge, particularly art director Jacinda Chew, who consulted online resources and various Marvel staff in order to cultivate extensive knowledge of the character.

Creative director Bryan Intihar said: "I feel like he's the most relatable of the heroes. As much as I love Tony Stark, it's harder to identify with a billionaire. As much as I love Thor, it's hard to identify with a god. Peter makes mistakes, he has ups and downs in his career, his relationships, his family. I think we can all relate to that". Price also commented that Spider-Man "is so human, and he's so relatable. He's also the most popular Marvel character in the world, I think". Price also considered the technical benefits; Sunset Overdrive has a dynamic traversal system that could be built upon for Spider-Man. Spider-Man became the first licensed property developed by Insomniac in its then 22-year existence.

Upon the announcement of the spin-off title Marvel's Spider-Man: Miles Morales for the PlayStation 4 and PlayStation 5, Sony vice president Simon Rutter told The Telegraph that the game was "an expansion and an enhancement to the previous game", while Insomniac later called the project a standalone game, stating that it is "the next adventure in the Marvel's Spider-Man universe". It is smaller in size and scope than Spider-Man, and has been compared to Uncharted: The Lost Legacy, a game which served as a standalone expansion that was smaller in size and scope than a mainline Uncharted title. The game was additionally described as featuring "a new story, with new set-pieces, fresh villains, and unique quests".

During the development of Marvel's Spider-Man, Insomniac, Marvel and SIE discussed prospects for future games based on Marvel Comics properties beyond Spider-Man, with the team at Insomniac continually suggesting their desire to work on a game featuring Wolverine. The development team were drawn to the character through the similar moral compass he shares with Spider-Man, notably the fact that "both heroes feel deeply compelled to defend people who are less able to do so". Insomniac eventually elected to pitch this idea to both Marvel and Sony as their next licensed property following their successful collaboration with the two parties on developing Marvel's Spider-Man. Marvel's Wolverine and Marvel's Spider-Man 2 were jointly announced in September 2021. For the latter game, Bryan Intihar and Ryan Smith served as the creative and game directors, respectively reprising their roles from Spider-Man.

Between 2022 and 2025, Sony released Spider-Man Remastered, Miles Morales and Spider-Man 2 on Windows following their initial launches on PlayStation consoles with assistance from support studio Nixxes Software, whom Sony acquired in July 2021. In February 2026, it was reported that Marvel's Wolverine and future titles were no longer expected to release for the platform as SIE rescinded support for PC versions of their single-player PlayStation Studios games. Studio Business CEO Herman Hulst later confirmed their intent to retain console exclusivity over future single-player titles from first-party PlayStation Studios developers, including Marvel's Wolverine and future Spider-Man games, in an internal town hall briefing in May 2026.

In December 2023, Insomniac Games was subjected to a ransomware attack by the group Rhysida, who successfully breached approximately 1.67 terabytes (TB) of studio assets, such as development documents, internal financial forecasts, and compromising sensitive information pertaining to various employees and staff members at the developer. Following the initial attack, Rhysida threatened to release all procured images and resources obtained from the hack seven days from the incident, additionally holding an auction for the data with a starting price at 50 Bitcoin, equivalent to US$2 million. Sony Interactive Entertainment issued a statement to Video Games Chronicle stating their intent to investigate the reports surrounding the hack, but did not anticipate the incident to affect other divisions of SIE or Sony Corporation as a whole. Upon the deadline's conclusion, company information including employee data, model dumps and pre-production slates for various games in development were published online. The materials principally concerned production assets related to Marvel's Wolverine, but also comprised other assets that alluded to the existence of multiple other Marvel video games at various stages in development, such as a standalone Venom spin-off game, Marvel's Spider-Man 3, and a previously canceled multiplayer game titled Marvel's Spider-Man: The Great Web that derived heavily from the concept of the "Spider-Verse" and featured a playable roster of alternate Spider-People. Other projects included proposed online expansions for Marvel's Spider-Man 2 and Marvel's Wolverine, and Marvel's X-Men, a standalone game focusing on the team of the same name that was expected to narratively follow Marvel's Wolverine. Additionally, an internal presentation detailing the royalty and exclusivity margins between Sony Interactive Entertainment and Marvel, revealed that the publisher had signed a new agreement for Insomniac Games to develop licensed X-Men video games until 2035, with the expectation that Marvel's Wolverine would begin a standalone trilogy of games centered around mutant characters in a similar vein to the Spider-Man games.

== Video games ==
Year	Title	Developer	Home release
2018	Marvel's Spider-Man	Insomniac Games	PlayStation 4, PlayStation 5,^{2} Windows^{2}
2018	Marvel's Spider-Man: The City That Never Sleeps^{1}	Insomniac Games	PlayStation 4, PlayStation 5,^{2} Windows^{2}
2020	Marvel's Spider-Man: Miles Morales	Insomniac Games	PlayStation 4, PlayStation 5, Windows
2023	Marvel's Spider-Man 2	Insomniac Games	PlayStation 5, Windows
2026	Marvel's Wolverine	Insomniac Games	PlayStation 5
Notes: 1. Downloadable content for Marvel's Spider-Man.; 2. Remastered version of Marvel's Spider-Man.

Release timeline
2018	Marvel's Spider-Man
2018	The City That Never Sleeps
2019
2020	Marvel's Spider-Man: Miles Morales
2020	Marvel's Spider-Man Remastered
2021
2022
2023	Marvel's Spider-Man 2
2024
2025
2026	Marvel's Wolverine

=== Marvel's Spider-Man games (2018–present) ===
==== Marvel's Spider-Man (2018) ====
Marvel's Spider-Man is the first entry in the series, released for the PlayStation 4 in September 2018. Taking place eight years into Peter Parker's career as Spider-Man, it focuses on the super-human crime lord Mister Negative, and his plot to seize control of New York City's criminal underworld. When he threatens to release a deadly virus with the assistance of a group of escaped supervillains known as the Sinister Six, Spider-Man must confront him and save the city while dealing with the personal problems of his civilian persona. He is accompanied in his efforts by former Daily Bugle colleague and ex-girlfriend Mary Jane Watson, New York City Police Department (NYPD) captain Yuri Watanabe, and Miles Morales, son of NYPD officer Jefferson Davis.

===== The City That Never Sleeps (2018) =====
Insomniac supported the game with a downloadable content (DLC) campaign, The City That Never Sleeps, consisting of three episodes that were released monthly from October to December 2018. Taking place a few months following the events of the base game, the DLC sees Spider-Man combat a new crime wave led by the physically enhanced mob boss Hammerhead, with the assistance of expert thief and former lover Felicia Hardy, and Silver Sablinova, the owner and operator of the mercenary group Sable International.

===== Marvel's Spider-Man Remastered (2020) =====
Marvel's Spider-Man Remastered collects both the original game and all three chapters of The City That Never Sleeps. The remaster additionally boasts numerous graphical and presentation improvements, namely the implementation of two game presets: "Fidelity Mode" for increasing the game's graphical detail and enabling real-time ray tracing, and "Performance Mode" for scaling the resolution dynamically while increasing the game's framerate. A third presentation option, "Performance RT", was added following the game's launch in order to enable real-time ray tracing while increasing performance capabilities. Other features include "near-instant loading" accomplished by the console SSD as well as support for both Sony's 3D Audio technology and the DualSense controller's haptic feedback. The remaster introduces a reworked in-game model for Peter Parker motion captured by Ben Jordan, replacing original actor John Bubinak, and also includes additional suits not initially available in the original PlayStation 4 release, including the exclusive "Black and Gold Suit" & "Hybrid Suit", inspired by the suits worn by Peter Parker in the Marvel Cinematic Universe (MCU) film Spider-Man: No Way Home (2021).

The game was initially released worldwide in November 2020 as a launch title for the PlayStation 5, and was bundled alongside the Ultimate Edition of Marvel's Spider-Man: Miles Morales on the console. Alternatively, it is obtainable through upgrading the PS4 version of Miles Morales and purchasing the remaster individually, and allowed cross-save functionality between it and the original PS4 version of Marvel's Spider-Man. The remaster was made available for individual purchase as a digital title on the PlayStation Store in May 2023, with existing owners of the original PS4 version being entitled to an upgrade for a fee. A Windows version of the remaster developed by PlayStation sister studio Nixxes Software was released as a standalone title on Steam and the Epic Games Store worldwide in August 2022. The PC version of the remaster boasts numerous specific improvements, such as NVIDIA DLSS and DLAA support, compatibility with ultrawide and panoramic display monitors, an additional presentation preset known as "Ultimate RT" for capable NVIDIA and AMD graphics cards, native support for various controllers and mouse & keyboard input, and options for unlocked framerates to enhance game performance.

==== Marvel's Spider-Man: Miles Morales (2020) ====
Marvel's Spider-Man: Miles Morales was released in November 2020 on the PlayStation 4, and as a launch title for the PlayStation 5, and was released for Windows in November 2022. It follows Parker's friend Miles Morales, who acquired similar spider-based powers at the end of the first game and was subsequently trained by Parker. When both Parker and Mary Jane Watson go on an excursion to Symkaria for a few weeks, Miles is left to defend New York as its sole Spider-Man, and must protect his new home, Harlem, after it becomes caught in the crossfire of a war between the Roxxon Energy Corporation and a high-tech criminal army called the Underground, led by the mysterious Tinkerer.

==== Marvel's Spider-Man 2 (2023) ====
Marvel's Spider-Man 2 launched on the PlayStation 5 in October 2023. It depicts Peter Parker and Miles Morales struggling to navigate their respective futures while balancing their personal lives with their duties to the city as Spider-Men. When the Hunters, a private mercenary group led by Sergei "Kraven" Kravinoff arrive and transform New York into a hunting ground for the Spider-Men and their rogues, Peter and Miles must combat a variety of villains while the former comes into contact with Venom, an extraterrestrial symbiote that bonds to Parker and negatively influences him.

==== Marvel's Spider-Man 3 ====
In September 2023, shortly before Marvel's Spider-Man 2's release, narrative director Ben Arfmann addressed the possibility of future games. The following month, senior creative director Bryan Intihar said that a potential third installment would be "pretty epic", comparing the stories of Spider-Man and Spider-Man: Miles Morales to the Marvel Cinematic Universe film Iron Man (2008) and the story of Spider-Man 2 to Captain America: Civil War (2016). Marvel's Spider-Man 2 co-writers Benjamin Arfmann and Britney Morris later addressed the implications of the game's ending, confirming that Miles Morales would be considered the main Spider-Man in the series' future entries. As part of a ransomware attack from the group Rhysidia in December 2023, details on Insomniac Games' future roadmap for titles were published online, including Marvel's Spider-Man 3, which was aiming internally for a 2028 launch with a consideration made for splitting the title into two parts.

=== Standalone games ===
==== Marvel's Wolverine (2026) ====
In September 2021, Insomniac Games announced at the PlayStation Showcase event that they were in early development for a new game, Marvel's Wolverine, based on the character of the same name. It features a standalone narrative set within the same continuity as the studio's Spider-Man games. It was released for PlayStation 5 in September 2026.

==== Other ====
In October 2023, senior narrative director Jon Paquette and Insomniac discussed the possibility of a spin-off game involving the Venom character after the character's debut in Spider-Man 2. A standalone Venom game (Note: Various different titles for the Venom game appear in the files published during the 2023 Insomniac Games ransomware attack, including Marvel's Venom, Marvel's Venom: Lethal Protector and Marvel's Spider-Man: Venom. An official title was not yet announced.) was leaked a few months later as part of an internal Insomniac Games roadmap discussing future titles for the studio, that was published online as part of a ransomware attack by the group Rhysidia. In April 2026, Miles Morales's voice actor Nadji Jeter, confirmed that the Venom game, along with a Venom themed DLC for Spider-Man 2, had been canceled following Tony Todd's death in 2024. Shortly after, it was suggested that this was not the case and the game is still in the works as recently as March 2026.

Another game, Marvel's X-Men, based on the eponymous team, was leaked as part of an internal Insomniac Games studio roadmap that was published online during the hack. It is expected to be a narrative continuation from the events of Marvel's Wolverine and the second game in an X-Men-focused trilogy.

== Characters ==
Character	Marvel's Spider-Man games				Standalone games
Character	Marvel's Spider-Man	Marvel's Spider-Man: The City That Never Sleeps	Marvel's Spider-Man: Miles Morales	Marvel's Spider-Man 2	Marvel's Wolverine
Character	2018		2020	2023	2026
=== Protagonists ===
Peter Parker Spider-Man	Yuri Lowenthal	Yuri Lowenthal	Yuri Lowenthal	Yuri Lowenthal	
Miles Morales Spider-Man	Nadji Jeter	Nadji Jeter	Nadji Jeter	Nadji Jeter	
Mary Jane Watson MJ	Laura Bailey	Laura Bailey		Laura Bailey	
James "Logan" Howlett Wolverine					Liam McIntyre
Jean Grey					Krizia Bajos
=== Antagonists ===
Maxwell "Max" Dillon Electro	Josh Keaton				
Wilson Fisk Kingpin	Travis Willingham		Travis Willingham		
MacDonald "Mac" Gargan Scorpion	Jason Spisak			Jason Spisak	
Martin Li Mister Negative	Stephen Oyoung			Stephen Oyoung	
Lonnie Lincoln Tombstone	Corey Jones			Corey Jones	
Anthony "Tony" Masters Taskmaster	Brian Bloom				
Otto Octavius Doctor Octopus	William Salyers		William Salyers	William Salyers	
Norman Osborn	Mark Rolston		Mark Rolston	Mark Rolston	
Herman Schultz Shocker	Dave B. Mitchell				
Screwball	Stephanie Lemelin	Stephanie Lemelin			
Aleksei Sytsevich Rhino	Fred Tatasciore		Fred Tatasciore		
Adrian Toomes Vulture	Dwight Schultz				
Venom	Silent		Silent	Tony Todd	
Joseph Martello Hammerhead		Keith Silverstein			
Curtis "Curt" Connors Lizard			Mark Whitten	Mark Whitten	
Aaron Davis Prowler			Ike Amadi	Ike Amadi	
Phin Mason The Tinkerer			Jasmin Savoy Brown		
Simon Krieger			Troy Baker		
Quentin Beck Mysterio				Noshir Dalal	
Cletus Kasady The Flame				Chad Doreck	
Sergei Kravinoff Kraven the Hunter				Jim Pirri	
Flint Marko Sandman				Leandro Cano	
Dimitri Smerdyakov Chameleon				Jim Pirri	
Nathaniel Essex Mister Sinister					Troy Baker
Victor Creed Sabretooth					Brett Gipson
Arkady Rossovich Omega Red					Raphael Corkhill
Raven Darkhölme Mystique					Nicole Pacent
Yuriko Oyama Lady Deathstrike					Jolene Kim
Ogun					TBA
Bolivar Trask					Jason Spisak
=== Supporting characters ===
Jefferson Davis	Russell Richardson		Russell Richardson		
Felicia Hardy Black Cat	Erica Lindbeck	Erica Lindbeck		Erica Lindbeck	
J. Jonah Jameson	Darin De Paul	Darin De Paul	Darin De Paul	Darin De Paul	
Morgan Michaels	Phil Morris				
Rio Morales	Jacqueline Pinol		Jacqueline Pinol	Jacqueline Pinol	
Harry Osborn	Scott Porter		Silent	Graham Phillips	
May Parker	Nancy Linari			Nancy Linari	
Silver Sablinova	Nichole Elise	Nichole Elise			
Yuri Watanabe Wraith	Tara Platt	Tara Platt		Tara Platt	
Walter Hardy		Daniel Riordan			
Hailey Cooper			Natasha Ofili	Natasha Ofili	
Danika Hart			Ashly Burch	Ashly Burch	
Ganke Lee			Griffin Puatu	Griffin Puatu	
Rick Mason			Todd Williams		
Albert Moon				Tom Choi	
Cindy Moon				Silent	
Shiro Yoshida Sunfire					Jonathan Tanigaki
Callisto					Debra Wilson
Leech					Noga Wind
Caliban					TBA
Mortimer Toynbee Toad					TBA

== Other media ==
=== Music ===
The Marvel's Spider-Man games have been composed by John Paesano, while Marvel's Wolverine was composed by David Fleming. The respective soundtracks for Marvel's Spider-Man and Marvel's Spider-Man: Miles Morales have been collected in digital streaming and physical vinyl formats in collaboration with Mondo. Additionally, three vocal tracks were produced for the Miles Morales original soundtrack: "I'm Ready" by Jaden Smith, and "Where We Come From" and "This is My Time" by Lecrae. A vocal track for Marvel's Spider-Man 2, "Swing" by EarthGang ft. Benji, was released on streaming services in September 2023.

=== Comics ===
==== City at War (2019) ====
Marvel's Spider-Man: City at War was published by Marvel Comics as their first title under their Gamerverse label in March 2019, serving as a six issue comic book adaptation of Marvel's Spider-Man's main campaign narrative, while expanding on specific story events. The adaptation was written by Dennis Hopeless, with art by Luca Maresca and colorist David Curiel.

==== Velocity (2019) ====
Marvel's Spider-Man: Velocity, published later in 2019, spans five issues and depicts an original narrative set within the continuity of the game. The story takes place between the events of the main campaign in Marvel's Spider-Man, and the events of the three-part downloadable content (DLC) campaign, The City That Never Sleeps, and explores the origin behind Parker's creation of the Velocity Suit, in addition to his encounter with the supervillain Swarm, and a separate investigation conducted by Mary Jane Watson and her colleague from the Daily Bugle, Ben Urich, into Haley Harvey, otherwise nicknamed the Speed Demon.

==== The Black Cat Strikes (2020) ====
Marvel's Spider-Man: The Black Cat Strikes, published in 2020, is a five issue limited series adapting the events of The City That Never Sleeps. Dennis Hopeless and Luca Maresca reprise their duties as story writer and artist, respectively. In addition to directly adapting the events from the game's narrative, the story additionally expands on Peter Parker and Felicia Hardy's relationship and history, through scenarios not depicted in the DLC chapters.

==== Free Comic Book Day: Marvel's Spider-Man 2 (2023) ====
As part of Free Comic Book Day in 2023, Sony Interactive Entertainment and Marvel published one-shot prequel comic that leads into the events of Marvel's Spider-Man 2, released on May 6, in local comic shops, and digitally on the Marvel Unlimited app. The comic was written by Christos Gage, who previously served as a writer on Marvel's Spider-Man, with art by Ig Gaura. The story follows Peter Parker, Miles Morales and Mary Jane Watson as the three of them struggle to balance Morales' school life, MJ's work and the responsibility the two Spider-Men have to New York as they come into conflict with a magic-infused criminal named The Hood.

=== Novels ===
==== Hostile Takeover (2018) ====
Marvel's Spider-Man: Hostile Takeover was written by David Liss and published by Titan Books on August 21, 2018. It is a prequel novel covering events before the main campaign of Marvel's Spider-Man, detailing Peter Parker's continued efforts to expose businessman Wilson Fisk's activities as the Kingpin of Crime, his encounter with the doppelganger vigilante Blood Spider, and his confrontation with Fisk's surrogate niece and assailant, Maya Lopez / Echo, who is convinced by Fisk that Spider-Man killed her father.

==== Wings of Fury (2020) ====
Marvel's Spider-Man: Miles Morales – Wings of Fury was written by Brittney Morris and published by Titan Books on November 10, 2020. It is a prequel novel taking place between the events of the downloadable content (DLC) campaign The City That Never Sleeps (2018) and the standalone game Marvel's Spider-Man: Miles Morales (2020). The story depicts Morales' early partnership with Peter Parker / Spider-Man, as the two vigilantes set out to apprehend Adrian Toomes / Vulture, who has broken out of the Raft and teamed with his granddaughter Tiana Toomes, going under the alias "Starling".

=== Behind the scenes books ===
==== Marvel's Spider-Man (2018) ====
Marvel's Spider-Man: The Art of the Game was published by Titan Books on September 11, 2018. Written by Paul Davies, it compiles numerous concept art pieces and renders of the game's primary cast, and various elements such as locations, costumes and tech, paired with additional insight into the game's creative process from developers, artists and designers who worked on the game.

==== Marvel's Spider-Man Script Book (2020) ====
Marvel's Spider-Man Script Book, authored by Jon Paquette, Christos Gage, and Benjamin Arfmann, was published on February 11, 2020. It features the game's original script alongside numerous art pieces and renders with added insights and commentary from the game's writers.

==== Marvel's Spider-Man: Miles Morales (2021) ====
Marvel's Spider-Man: Miles Morales – The Art of the Game, authored by Matt Ralphs, was published by Titan Books on February 23, 2021. It compiles concept illustrations and various in-game renderings of characters, tech, locations, gadgets and costumes from throughout the development period of the title.

== Appearances outside the games ==
=== Integration into Marvel Comics' multiverse ===
Insomniac's Peter Parker appeared in the crossover event "Spider-Geddon" (2018), a sequel to the 2014 storyline "Spider-Verse" written by Christos Gage and published by Marvel Comics on September 26, 2018, following the character's debut appearance in Marvel's Spider-Man. It established the game's events as taking place in the universe of "Earth-1048" within the larger Marvel Multiverse. In the story, Parker joins forces with the Superior Spider-Army led by Otto Octavius / Superior Spider-Man, in order to combat the recently liberated Inheritors and avert the deaths of all Spider-People across the multiverse. The story of Spider-Geddon takes place after the events of the game, and also introduces the universe's version of Tarantula, with Octavius secretly leaving a message for his game counterpart, to allow him to potentially also become the Superior Spider-Man.

=== Film ===
Peter's Advanced Suit from Marvel's Spider-Man is depicted in the Spider-Lair among the lineup of alternate suits worn by the Peter Parker of Miles Morales' reality in the animated film Spider-Man: Into the Spider-Verse (2018). Peter himself from the games makes a physical appearance in its sequel Spider-Man: Across the Spider-Verse (2023), as Insomniac Spider-Man of Earth-1048 and a member of the Spider-Society led by Miguel O' Hara / Spider-Man 2099, with Yuri Lowenthal briefly reprising his voice role. Other versions of Peter Parker with the Advanced Suit from the first game can be seen in the same style as other characters in the film. In addition, gameplay of Marvel's Spider-Man 2 was featured in a scene at Miles Morales' dorm room, where his best friend Ganke Lee was seen playing the game on a PlayStation 5 console.

=== Related video games ===
The Marvel's Spider-Man series, among other titles developed by Insomniac Games, was referenced in Astro's Playroom (2020), a pack-in game for the PlayStation 5 released at the console's launch, which featured numerous allusions to various franchises published on or exclusive to PlayStation consoles. When entering the Caching Caves area, turning south-east of the Shock Walls leads to a room with an Astro Bot hanging upside-down from a web on the ceiling, referencing a pose commonly associated with the character. Peter Parker and Miles Morales themselves appear in Playroom's follow up Astro Bot as unlockable bots found in the game's Winter Wonder level, released in a free update on December 12, 2024.

Marvel's Iron Man VR was released in July 2020 on the PlayStation VR, and later ported to the Meta Quest 2 and released by Oculus Studios in November 2022. Published by Sony Interactive Entertainment, it features a standalone narrative which references the continuity of the Marvel's Spider-Man games. Director Ryan Payton later stated that despite the developer's intent to tell a standalone narrative, "there are definitely opportunities to link the worlds" and he hoped that the two-game series could share some references to each other in future installments.

An alternate skin inspired by Peter Parker's Advanced Suit 2.0 design was added in a post-launch update for the game Marvel Rivals (2024) in January 2025 to coincide with the release of Marvel's Spider-Man 2 on Windows, which was bundled with a special emote and themed nameplate. An alternate skin for Spider-Man also inspired by Parker's Advanced Suit 2.0, is available exclusively as an add-on for the Digital Deluxe Edition of Marvel Tokon: Fighting Souls (2026) on PlayStation 5 and Windows. The alternate "Battle Reborn" skin for Wolverine, inspired by Logan's primary suit in Marvel's Wolverine, will be added to Fighting Souls in a post-launch update on September 1, 2026.

== Reception ==
Aggregate review scores
Game	Metacritic
Marvel's Spider-Man	87/100
Marvel's Spider-Man: Miles Morales	(PS4) 84/100 (PS5) 85/100 (PC) 88/100
Marvel's Spider-Man 2	(PS5) 90/100 (PC) 76/100
Marvel’s Wolverine	78/100

The three currently released games in the Marvel's Spider-Man series have been met with critical acclaim and commercial success. Critics have cited Marvel's Spider-Man (2018) as one of the best comic book-based games ever created, with outlets such as VentureBeat and Game Informer positively comparing the game to Batman: Arkham Asylum (2009), a game that was similarly praised for breaking conventions associated with games based on comic book characters with its reinterpretation of the mythos. The game's mechanics were another point of praise, with many lauding the innovations and refinements made to the web-swinging and traversal systems. EGMNOW commented on the gameplay in Marvel's Spider-Man being more streamlined compared to the similar functions present in the video game adaptation Spider-Man 2 (2004). The combat was similarly praised for its fluidity and emphasis on gadgetry and utilization of the environment for performing attacks, with IGN further observing how the depth of the game's combat system allowed for improvization. The story received particular praise from critics and fans. USGamer specifically cited the narrative as the game's strongest aspect and highlighted the story's interpretation of the title character and his supporting cast, while GamesRadar+ described its characters as being voiced and performed with unexpected depth and charisma. The Remastered port for PlayStation 5 and PC received additional praise for its updated presentation, improvements to technical details such as facial and hair textures, and additional quality-of-life improvements that brought the game in closer parity with Miles Morales, although the replacement of John Bubinak with Ben Jordan as the facial capture model for Peter Parker garnered a mixed response. The PC version was particularly applauded for its optimization for the platform and seamless compatibility on the Steam Deck.

Marvel's Spider-Man: Miles Morales (2020) also enjoyed similarly favorable reviews. Jonathon Dornbush of IGN enjoyed the new PS5 enhancements of the game and the more compelling side content. Destructoid's Chris Carter praised the game's story and Miles' new abilities. Andrew Reiner of Game Informer appreciated the improvements to combat and the area of Harlem.

=== Sales ===
As of May 2022, the Marvel's Spider-Man series has sold over 33 million copies worldwide. Marvel's Spider-Man (2018) managed to sell 3.3 million units—including those bundled with PlayStation 4 consoles, within its first three days of release, resulting in the title surpassing the 3.1 million unit mark previously achieved by God of War (2018) to become the fastest selling first-party video game release in Sony Interactive Entertainment's history, as well as the fastest-selling PlayStation 4 exclusive entirely, up until that record was usurped by Final Fantasy VII Remake (2020) from Square Enix at 3.5 million units within the same timeframe. The news outlet USA Today additionally estimated that the game made at least $198 million during said period for Sony, surpassing the $117 million domestic box office total accumulated by the Marvel Cinematic Universe (MCU) film Spider-Man: Homecoming in 2017. Additionally, sales projections from The NPD Group touted that Marvel's Spider-Man had garnered 37% higher release-month sales than the combined totals for every previous Spider-Man game released since 1995. By July 2019, Marvel's Spider-Man became the best-selling game based on a comic book character, beating out the combined lifetime sales of Batman: Arkham City (2011) from WB Games and Rocksteady, after having already achieved the title of the fastest-selling comic book-based game in the U.S. in November 2018. The game additionally became one of the best-selling Western-developed PlayStation 4 titles in Japan, being surpassed only by Call of Duty: Black Ops 4 (2018) and Minecraft (2011), as well as the best-selling Western-developed SIE title since Crash Bandicoot: Warped for the original PlayStation, developed by Naughty Dog in 1998. The game's Remastered release for Windows debuted with a concurrent peak of 63,384 players on the Steam platform, making it the second largest debut for a PlayStation Studios title on Steam following God of War.

The PlayStation 4 version of Marvel's Spider-Man: Miles Morales (2020) sold 22,882 physical copies within its first week on sale in Japan, making it the eighth-best-selling retail game of the week in the country. During the same week, the PlayStation 5 version was the tenth-best-selling retail game in Japan, selling 18,640 physical copies. Marvel's Spider-Man: Miles Morales was also the best-selling physical PlayStation 5 launch game in the United Kingdom. In Germany, the game sold over 100,000 copies in its launch month and 200,000 copies by the end of December 2020. As of December 2020, the game has sold a combined total of 663,000 digital copies across both the PlayStation 4 and PlayStation 5 platforms. In April 2021, Jeff Grubb of VentureBeat reported that the game had outsold both The Last of Us Part II and Ghost of Tsushima (both 2020) with regards to lifetime sales. As of July 2021, the game had sold over 6.5 million copies. Miles Morales was the twelfth best-selling game of 2020, and the sixth best-selling game of 2021.

In November 2020, it was informed that Marvel's Spider-Man reportedly sold more than 20 million copies.

In May 2022, the Marvel's Spider-Man series was reported to have sold over 33 million copies. Marvel's Spider-Man 2 sold over five million units in ten days.

As of February 14, 2024, the Marvel's Spider-Man series sold more than 50 million copies, with Marvel's Spider-Man 2 having sold 10 million units. As of August 10, 2026, Marvel's Spider-Man 2 had sold 18 million units, pushing the franchise's total sales to at least 58 million copies. By September 2024, Marvel's Spider-Man Miles Morales had sold around 15 million units.

Year	Game	Sales
2018	Marvel's Spider-Man	25 million
2020	Marvel's Spider-Man: Miles Morales	15 million
2023	Marvel's Spider-Man 2	18 million
Total series sales: 58 million+

== See also ==
- List of video games featuring Spider-Man
- List of video games featuring the X-Men
- Wolverine in other media
- Marvel Games
