= Marvel's Spider-Man: Miles Morales =

2020 superhero video game

- Developer: Insomniac Games (Note: Ported to Windows by Nixxes Software)
- Publisher: Sony Interactive Entertainment
- Director: Brian Horton
- Producer: Jess Read
- Designer: Cameron Christian
- Programmers: Joel Bartley; Ross McIntosh; Doug Sheahan
- Artists: Jason Hickey; Gavin Goulden
- Writers: Ben Arfmann; Mary Kenney
- Composer: John Paesano
- Series: Marvel's Spider-Man
- Platforms: PlayStation 4; PlayStation 5; Windows
- Release: PlayStation 4: WW: November 12, 2020; PlayStation 5: NA/AU: November 12, 2020; WW: November 19, 2020; Windows: WW: November 18, 2022
- Genre: Action-adventure
- Mode: Single-player

Marvel's Spider-Man: Miles Morales is a 2020 action-adventure game developed by Insomniac Games and published by Sony Interactive Entertainment. Based on the Marvel Comics character Miles Morales, it is inspired by both the character's decade-long comic book mythology and appearances in other media. The game is a spin-off and follow-up to Marvel's Spider-Man (2018), and the second installment in Insomniac's Spider-Man series. The narrative focuses on Miles' struggle to balance the duties of his civilian persona and his role as the second Spider-Man when his new home, Harlem, is threatened by a war between a high-tech criminal army called the Underground, led by the mysterious Tinkerer, and the Roxxon Energy Corporation.

Gameplay is presented from the third-person perspective, with a primary focus on Miles' traversal and combat abilities. Miles can freely move around New York City, interacting with characters, undertaking missions, and unlocking new gadgets and suits by progressing through the main story or completing tasks. Outside the story, the player is able to complete side missions to unlock additional content and collectible items. Combat focuses on chaining attacks together and using the environment, webs, and Venom attacks to incapacitate numerous foes while avoiding damage.

Marvel's Spider-Man: Miles Morales was officially revealed in June 2020 and launched that November for the PlayStation 4 and as a launch title for the PlayStation 5. A Windows version was later released in November 2022 and received generally favourable reviews from critics, with praise for its combat, narrative, content, and technical improvements of the PlayStation 5 version, though its short length received some criticism. Marvel's Spider-Man 2, which acts as a sequel to the first game and a direct continuation of Miles Morales, was released for the PlayStation 5 in October 2023.

== Gameplay ==
Miles scanning an area

The core gameplay of Marvel's Spider-Man: Miles Morales is the same as its predecessor. It features the same open world, a fictionalized version of modern-day Manhattan, which is covered in snow because the game is set during Christmas time. Miles controls similarly to Peter Parker, but with new animations and abilities, which are unlocked as the story progresses. The new powers include Venom Blast, which allows the player to incapacitate enemies with bio-electricity and charge or drain electronics; Camouflage, giving Miles temporary invisibility; and Mega Venom Blast, consisting of a massive explosion of bio-electricity that damages all nearby enemies. The game introduces new gadgets, such as Remote Mines, which can attach to enemies or electrical panels; a device that summons holographic fighters to help in combat; and Gravity Wells that trap multiple enemies and make them easier to hit. Miles' abilities and gadgets can be upgraded as the player levels up via a skill tree system. Another new feature is an in-game mobile app that offers Miles feedback on ongoing crimes and can be used to access side missions.

Miles possesses a "spider sense", which warns the player of incoming attacks and allows them to dodge and retaliate, and web-shooters, which fire lines of webs that can be used during both traversal and combat, in several different ways. Miles can also jump large distances, stick to surfaces, and fast travel using the New York City Subway system. There are several unlockable suits for Miles, some of which are based on existing versions of the character in media, as well as original suits created for the game. Many of these enhance Miles' abilities, such as allowing him to take more damage, stay invisible for a longer time, or regenerate Venom Power faster. During certain sections of the game, players control Miles in his civilian persona and cannot use any of his abilities or gadgets.

== Synopsis ==
=== Characters and setting ===
The narrative of the game continues from where Marvel's Spider-Man and its downloadable content The City That Never Sleeps left off, during which Miles Morales (Nadji Jeter) was bitten by a genetically enhanced spider and gained powers similar to his mentor and friend Peter Parker (Yuri Lowenthal). A year after the first game's conclusion, Miles has been trained by Peter, moved from Brooklyn to Harlem, and has fully integrated himself into the role of a Spider-Man. He is still in the process of gaining experience and doubts whether he can live up to Peter's legacy. At the beginning of the game, Peter leaves New York for Symkaria for several weeks to help his girlfriend Mary Jane Watson with her reporting there and trusts Miles to protect the city in his absence. Now the sole Spider-Man, Miles must balance his superhero responsibilities with supporting his mother Rio Morales (Jacqueline Piñol) in her campaign for City Council and defending his new home from a violent war between the corrupt Roxxon Energy Corporation and a high-tech criminal army known as the Underground.

Aside from Miles, Peter, and Rio, the game features several other returning characters from Marvel's Spider-Man, including the supervillain Rhino (Fred Tatasciore), the imprisoned crime lord Wilson Fisk (Travis Willingham), anti-Spider-Man podcast host J. Jonah Jameson (Darin De Paul), and F.E.A.S.T. volunteer Gloria Davila (Melanie Minichino). Peter's former mentor and employer Dr. Otto Octavius (William Salyers) appears in a flashback, while the head of Oscorp and former New York mayor Norman Osborn (Mark Rolston) appears in a mid-credits scene. Miles's late father, Officer Jefferson Davis (Russell Richardson), appears in a voice-only role. Norman's son Harry is also featured in a non-speaking appearance in the mid-credits scene via a first-person perspective.

The new cast includes Miles' best friend and classmate Ganke Lee (Griffin Puatu), who is aware of his secret identity and assists him with his Spider-Man activities; Miles' estranged and overprotective uncle Aaron Davis (Ike Amadi), who leads a double life as the armored mercenary Prowler; the head of Roxxon's R&D department Simon Krieger (Troy Baker); podcaster and Spider-Man supporter Danika Hart (Ashly Burch); deaf street artist Hailey Cooper (Natasha Ofili); bodega owner Teo Alvarez (Yancey Arias); Caleb's Clean Cuts barber Caleb Ward (Emerson Brooks); Pana Fuerte restaurateur Camila Vasquez (Krizia Bajos); and Miles' childhood best friend Phin Mason (Jasmin Savoy Brown), as the Tinkerer, the figurehead of the Underground, who seeks to avenge her brother Rick. The mid-credits scene introduces Dr. Curt Connors, who is voiced by an uncredited actor.

=== Plot ===
After more than a year of training under Peter Parker, (Note: As depicted in the previous game and its DLC arc "The City That Never Sleeps") Miles Morales has mastered his superpowers and established himself as the original Spider-Man's crime-fighting partner, though he still struggles to adapt to his new role. While he and Peter escort a police transport carrying prisoners to the rebuilt Raft, Miles accidentally releases several inmates, including Rhino. While trying to stop Rhino's rampage through the city, Peter is knocked unconscious. Miles intervenes to protect him and defeats Rhino with his new bio-electric ability, later dubbed "Venom Blast". Leaving Rhino in the custody of energy corporation Roxxon, headed by Simon Krieger, Peter informs Miles that he will be going to Symkaria for a few weeks to assist Mary Jane Watson as her photographer as she writes a story on the country's civil war, and entrusts Miles to look after New York in his absence as its sole Spider-Man. Later, Miles investigates a break-in at Roxxon Plaza and stops a hi-tech criminal group called the Underground from stealing Roxxon's new experimental power source, Nuform. Returning home to celebrate Christmas with Rio and Ganke, Miles is surprised to learn that Rio also invited his childhood friend Phin, with whom he has not spoken in months. The next day, Ganke creates a Spider-Man app so citizens can call Miles for help directly. Miles' uncle, Aaron Davis, is the first to use it and reveals that he knows his nephew's identity as Spider-Man.

Miles soon witnesses the conflict between the Underground and Roxxon escalate, as the former attack one of Rio's campaign rallies in front of Roxxon Plaza and a Roxxon transport carrying Nuform on the Braithwaite Bridge. Miles tries to prevent the Underground from stealing the Nuform, discovering Phin is the Tinkerer in the process, but his Venom Power causes most of the Nuform to explode, destroying the bridge and damaging his public image. Ganke gives him a pep talk and reminds Miles that for now, he is New York's only Spider-Man, encouraging Miles to become better and make his own unique Spider-Man costume in the process. While investigating Phin's connection to the Underground, Miles discovers that her brother Rick created Nuform during his work for Roxxon, but soon became sick due to its unstable properties. Phin and Rick sought to expose the dangers of Nuform to the public, but while trying to shut down a Nuform reactor, the latter was killed by Krieger, who subsequently took credit for Nuform's creation. With Aaron as the Prowler, Miles infiltrates a Roxxon lab to retrieve Phin's phone, which contains evidence of Krieger's crimes, but the phone is destroyed during his escape.

At Aaron's advice, Miles uses his friendship with Phin to infiltrate the Underground and learn more about their plans. He discovers that Phin created the Underground's advanced weaponry out of a special component, programmable matter, in exchange for their help in exacting revenge on Krieger, which she plans to achieve by sabotaging the Nuform reactor at Roxxon Plaza to destroy it and expose Nuform's dangerous side effects. However, Miles is soon forced to reveal his identity as Spider-Man to Phin in order to save his own life, souring their friendship. While meeting with Phin to try and reconcile with her, the two are captured by Roxxon with the aid of Rhino, whose exosuit has been enhanced by Roxxon tech. Miles and Phin escape, but the former learns that Aaron has been spying on him for Roxxon and that Krieger modified the plaza's Nuform reactor to destroy Harlem if Phin's plan succeeds. After being defeated, Rhino taunts Phin about Rick's death, causing her to viciously attack him. Miles intervenes to stop her from killing Rhino, but a furious Phin escapes after knocking Miles out.

Ganke brings an injured Miles home, where Rio discovers her son's identity as Spider-Man, but continues to support him. After recovering, Miles heads off to stop Phin, but is captured by Aaron, who imprisons him underground to prevent him from being killed like his father, Jefferson Davis, whom Aaron was unable to reconcile with prior to his death, resulting in his overprotectiveness of Miles. Miles escapes and defeats Aaron, explaining that he cannot turn his back on people when they need him. Inspired by his nephew's words, Aaron assists Rio with evacuating Harlem as the Underground and Roxxon fight on the streets, allowing Miles to head to Roxxon Plaza to stop Phin. Unable to reason with Phin, Miles fights and overpowers her before attempting to absorb the Nuform from the reactor to negate the blast, but the amount of energy proves too much to handle. Realizing her errors, Phin flies Miles to a safe distance above the city so that he can release the energy, killing her in the process. Miles plummets to the ground, where his identity is exposed to a few citizens he helped as Spider-Man, who promise to keep his secret and hail him as a hero.

Four weeks later, Roxxon is dealt numerous lawsuits, and Krieger is arrested after Aaron turns himself in and testifies against Krieger. Peter returns home from Symkaria and praises Miles for his growth and heroism, before they head off to fight crime together as the Spider-Men. In a mid-credits scene, Norman Osborn orders a reluctant Curt Connors to release his terminally ill son Harry Osborn from stasis despite the latter's unstable condition. In a post-credits scene, Miles leaves an award he won with Phin atop Trinity Church in her memory.

== Development ==
Marvel's Spider-Man: Miles Morales was developed by Insomniac Games and published by Sony Interactive Entertainment for the PlayStation 4 and PlayStation 5. Sony vice president Simon Rutter told The Telegraph that the game is "an expansion and an enhancement to the previous game", while Insomniac later called the project a standalone game, stating that it is "the next adventure in the Marvel's Spider-Man universe". It is smaller in size and scope than Spider-Man, and has been compared to Uncharted: The Lost Legacy, a game which served as a standalone expansion that was smaller in size and scope than a mainline Uncharted title.

The game features "a new story, with new set-pieces, fresh villains, and unique quests". For the PlayStation 5 version, the game takes advantage of the console's increased processing power, dedicated ray-tracing hardware, custom solid-state drive storage, Tempest Engine and DualSense controller to support features such as advanced haptic feedback, real-time ray tracing effects, 3D spatial audio and reduced loading times. The PlayStation 5 version of Marvel's Spider-Man: Miles Morales supports high dynamic range and an optional "performance mode" that allows the game to run at 4K resolution and 60 frames per second.

The game had "gone gold" in October 2020, meaning that physical copies of the game were ready to be produced, with any further development being patched into the game through software updates.

== Music ==
John Paesano returned to compose the musical score for Marvel's Spider-Man: Miles Morales after composing 2018's Spider-Man. Unlike the original game's music which was more orchestral-based, Miles Morales' soundtrack mixes orchestral themes with hip hop music. Three original songs were created for the soundtrack: "I'm Ready" by Jaden Smith, and "Where We Come From" and "This Is My Time" by Lecrae.

== Marketing ==
=== Tie-in media and merchandise ===
A prequel novel, Marvel's Spider-Man: Miles Morales – Wings of Fury, was published on November 10, 2020, and written by Brittney Morris. The novel follows Miles coming to terms with what it means to be Spider-Man. He is left questioning everything when Vulture and his accomplice Starling release experimental tech onto New York City. A companion book, Marvel's Spider-Man: Miles Morales – The Art of the Game by Matt Ralphs, was released on February 16, 2021. It features a collection of concept art, in-game renderings, and insights from the artists and Insomniac Games.

In March 2021, Funko Pop! Vinyl figures of the Classic and T.R.A.C.K. suits from the game, were released, with the latter of the two having a limited edition chase variant in which Miles is unmasked. A further selection of the 2020, Bodega Cat, S.T.R.I.K.E, Advanced Tech, Purple Rein, Crimson Cowl, Winter and Programmable Matter suits were released in the following month, with the last two having exclusive variants available at Hot Topic and GameStop respectively.

== Release ==
The game was announced in June 2020 at the PlayStation 5 reveal event as a launch title. It was released worldwide on November 12 the same year for PlayStation 4, with the PlayStation 5 version also releasing in North America, Australia and New Zealand on that date; a week later, it was released worldwide for the PlayStation 5. The game is available in numerous editions. The standard edition includes the base game and is available for both consoles, with the PlayStation 4 version supporting a free upgrade to the PlayStation 5 version. The Ultimate Edition is available for the PlayStation 5, bundling together the base game and Marvel's Spider-Man Remastered. Launch variants of all editions were available in North America, and these variants feature instant access to the following; the T.R.A.C.K. suit (Note: This suit is unrelated to the Tracksuit Mafia that opposed Hawkeye in one of his titular comic book series in 2012.) and Miles' suit from the 2018 animated film Spider-Man: Into the Spider-Verse, three extra skill points and a Gravity Well Gadget. International retailers delivered this content separately as a redeemable code. All of these bonus items are available throughout the course of the game to those who did not receive the pre-order bonuses.

The standalone game features a dedication to the original actor for the Marvel Cinematic Universe's Black Panther, Chadwick Boseman, who died of colon cancer two months before the game's release. An enhanced version of Miles Morales (featuring a variety of graphical options, unlocked framerates, ultrawide monitor support, and support for other technologies such as Nvidia's DLSS 3 and Reflex, as well as AMD's FidelityFX Super Resolution (FSR) 2.1 and Intel's XeSS) was released on Windows on November 18, 2022, via Steam and the Epic Games Store, just three months after Spider-Man Remastered was released. The port was developed by PlayStation studio Nixxes Software.

== Reception ==
Reception

Aggregate scores
Aggregator	Score
Metacritic	PS4: 84/100; PS5: 85/100; PC: 88/100
OpenCritic	94% recommend

Review scores
Publication	Score
Destructoid	9/10
Edge	7/10
Electronic Gaming Monthly	5/5
Game Informer	9/10
GameSpot	7/10
GamesRadar+	4/5
IGN	9/10
Jeuxvideo.com	16/20
PlayStation Official Magazine – UK	9/10
PC Gamer (US)	84/100
The Telegraph	3/5
The Guardian	4/5
USgamer	4.5/5
VG247	4/5

Marvel's Spider-Man: Miles Morales received "generally favorable reviews", according to review aggregator Metacritic. Fellow review aggregator OpenCritic assessed that the game received "mighty" approval, being recommended by 94% of critics.

Jonathon Dornbush of IGN enjoyed the new PS5 enhancements of the game and the more compelling side content. Destructoid's Chris Carter praised the game's story and Miles' new abilities. Andrew Reiner of Game Informer appreciated the improvements to combat and the area of Harlem.

=== Sales ===
The PlayStation 4 version of Marvel's Spider-Man: Miles Morales sold 22,882 physical units within its first week on sale in Japan, making it the eighth-best-selling retail game of the week in the country. During the same week, the PlayStation 5 version was the tenth-best-selling retail game in Japan, selling 18,640 physical units. By March 2023, 92,846 units of the game had been sold in Japan. Miles Morales was also the best-selling physical PlayStation 5 launch game in the UK. In Germany, the game sold over 100,000 units in its launch month and 200,000 units by the end of December 2020. In April 2021, Jeff Grubb of VentureBeat reported that the game had outsold both The Last of Us Part II and Ghost of Tsushima in the United States. It was the twelfth best-selling game of 2020 and the sixth best-selling game of 2021 in the United States.

By December 2020, Miles Morales had sold 663,000 digital units across both PlayStation 4 and PlayStation 5. The game had sold over 6.5 million units by July 2021. In December 2023, Insomniac Games were the victim of a leak because of a ransomware attack. This leak revealed that in June 2020 Miles Morales was projected to sell over 10.2 million units and generate $260 million in revenue. As of June 2023 the game sold 14.4 million units worldwide, turning a profit of nearly $270 million for a 242% return on investment.

=== Accolades ===
Date	Award	Category	Recipient(s) and nominee(s)	Result	Ref.
December 10, 2020	The Game Awards	Best Performance	Nadji Jeter as Miles Morales	Nominated	
December 10, 2020	The Game Awards	Best Action/Adventure	Marvel's Spider-Man: Miles Morales	Nominated	
December 10, 2020	The Game Awards	Player's Voice	Marvel's Spider-Man: Miles Morales	Nominated	
January 26, 2021	New York Game Awards	Tin Pan Alley Award for Best Music in a Game	John Paesano	Nominated	
January 26, 2021	New York Game Awards	Herman Melville Award for Best Writing	Marvel's Spider-Man: Miles Morales	Nominated	
January 26, 2021	New York Game Awards	Great White Way Award for Best Acting in a Game	Nadji Jeter as Miles Morales	Nominated	
March 25, 2021	British Academy Games Awards	Best Game	Marvel's Spider-Man: Miles Morales	Nominated	
March 25, 2021	British Academy Games Awards	Animation	Marvel's Spider-Man: Miles Morales	Nominated	
March 25, 2021	British Academy Games Awards	Audio Achievement	Marvel's Spider-Man: Miles Morales	Nominated	
March 25, 2021	British Academy Games Awards	Music	John Paesano	Won	
March 25, 2021	British Academy Games Awards	Narrative	Marvel's Spider-Man: Miles Morales	Nominated	
March 25, 2021	British Academy Games Awards	Performer in a Leading Role	Nadji Jeter as Miles Morales	Nominated	
March 25, 2021	British Academy Games Awards	Technical Achievement	Marvel's Spider-Man: Miles Morales	Nominated	
April 6, 2021	Visual Effects Society Awards	Outstanding Visual Effects in a Real-Time Project	Gavin Goulden, Jess Reed, Bryanna Lindsey, Mike Yosh	Nominated	
April 16, 2021	Annie Awards	Outstanding Achievement for Character Animation in a Video Game	Brian Wyser, Michael Yosh, Danny Garnett, David Hancock	Won	
April 22, 2021	D.I.C.E. Awards	Outstanding Achievement in Character	Miles Morales (written by Ben Arfmann, Jon Paquette, Mary Kenney, Max Folkman, Evan Narcisse; portrayed by Nadji Jeter)	Won	
April 22, 2021	D.I.C.E. Awards	Action Game of the Year	Ted Price, Brian Horton, Cameron Christian	Nominated	
April 22, 2021	D.I.C.E. Awards	Outstanding Achievement in Game Design	Cameron Christian	Nominated	
April 22, 2021	D.I.C.E. Awards	Outstanding Achievement in Animation	Danny Garnett, Brian Wyser, Mike Yosh	Nominated	
April 22, 2021	D.I.C.E. Awards	Outstanding Achievement in Art Direction	Jason Hickey, Gavin Goulden	Nominated	
January 3, 2023	The Steam Awards	Outstanding Visual Style	Marvel's Spider-Man: Miles Morales	Won	
January 3, 2023	The Steam Awards	Outstanding Story-Rich Game	Marvel's Spider-Man: Miles Morales (Remastered)	Nominated	
