= Miles Morales =

Marvel Comics superhero

Miles Morales Spider-Man
- Miles Morales as Spider-Man from Ultimate Comics: Spider-Man; Art by Sara Pichelli

Publication information
- Publisher: Marvel Comics
- First appearance: Ultimate Fallout #4 (August 2011)
- Created by: Brian Michael Bendis (writer); Sara Pichelli (artist); (Based on Spider-Man by Stan Lee and Steve Ditko)

In-story information
- Full name: Miles Gonzalo Morales
- Species: Human mutate
- Place of origin: Earth-1610
- Team affiliations: Avengers; Young Avengers; Champions; The Ultimates; Spider-Army/Web-Warriors
- Partnerships: Peter Parker (Spider-Man); Spider-Woman (Gwen Stacy); Ms. Marvel (Kamala Khan); Tiana Toomes (Starling)
- Notable aliases: Spider-Man; Spin; Shadow Spider; Captain Universe; Jersey Spider-Man
- Abilities: Superhuman strength, speed, agility, reflexes, and durability; Camouflage (invisibility); Bio-electric manipulation; Precognitive spider-sense; Ability to cling to solid surfaces; Genius-level intellect; Skilled martial artist and hand-to-hand combatant; Utilizes wrist-mounted web-shooters

Miles Gonzalo Morales (/məˈrælɛs/), known by the alias Spider-Man, is a superhero who appears in American comic books published by Marvel Comics. He was created in 2011 by writer Brian Michael Bendis and artist Sara Pichelli, along with input by Marvel's then-editor-in-chief Axel Alonso, as a modern reimagining of the original Spider-Man (Peter Parker). Miles Morales debuted in Ultimate Comics: Fallout #4.

The teenage son of a Black American father and an Afro-Puerto Rican mother, Miles Morales is the second Spider-Man to appear in Ultimate Marvel, an imprint with a separate continuity from the mainstream Marvel Universe. He first appeared in Ultimate Fallout #4 (August 2011), following the death of the Ultimate Peter Parker. The character was initially introduced in the alternate Earth-1610 (portrayed in the Ultimate Universe comics), in which he was bitten by a spider genetically engineered at the behest of Norman Osborn in an attempt to duplicate the abilities of Spider-Man. He was featured in the Ultimate Comics: Spider-Man comic book series. After Marvel ended the Ultimate imprint in 2015, Miles was transported to the main Marvel Universe (Earth-616), beginning with stories under the All-New, All-Different Marvel branding that debuted that same year, depicted as the fourth Spider-Man of that universe (after Peter Parker, Ben Reilly, and Otto Octavius). Reaction to the character was mixed, with controversy surrounding Miles' Afro-Latino racial identity compared to the white Peter. Some, including Stan Lee—the co-creator of Peter Parker/Spider-Man—approved the creation of Miles as a positive role model for children of color. Others expressed displeasure at the replacement of Peter, with The Guardian, Fox News, and Culture Map Houston reporting that some fans viewed the decision as an attempt by Marvel Comics to exhibit political correctness, and that the introduction of a minority Spider-Man was simply a publicity stunt to attract more readers, a charge Alonso denied. Alexandra Petri of The Washington Post called for the character to be judged on the quality of his stories, which garnered positive reviews.

As a result of the character's popularity, Miles Morales has been adapted in numerous media outside comics. The character was not the lead protagonist in the Ultimate Spider-Man animated television series, but was later added to the main cast, as an alternate Spider-Man from another universe voiced by Donald Glover in season three and Ogie Banks in season four, later named Kid Arachnid. Nadji Jeter first voiced the character, later named Spy-D, in the Disney XD animated series Spider-Man (2017–2020), and went on to reprise his role in the Marvel's Spider-Man (2018–present) video game series developed by Insomniac Games, and Marvel Ultimate Alliance 3: The Black Order (2019). Miles Morales also appears in Spidey and His Amazing Friends, where he goes by the alias Spin. Miles is also the star of the animated Spider-Verse film franchise produced by Sony Pictures Animation, with Shameik Moore voicing the character in the Academy Award-winning feature film Spider-Man: Into the Spider-Verse (2018), as well as its sequels Across the Spider-Verse (2023) and Beyond the Spider-Verse (upcoming, 2027).

== Publication history ==
=== Creation ===
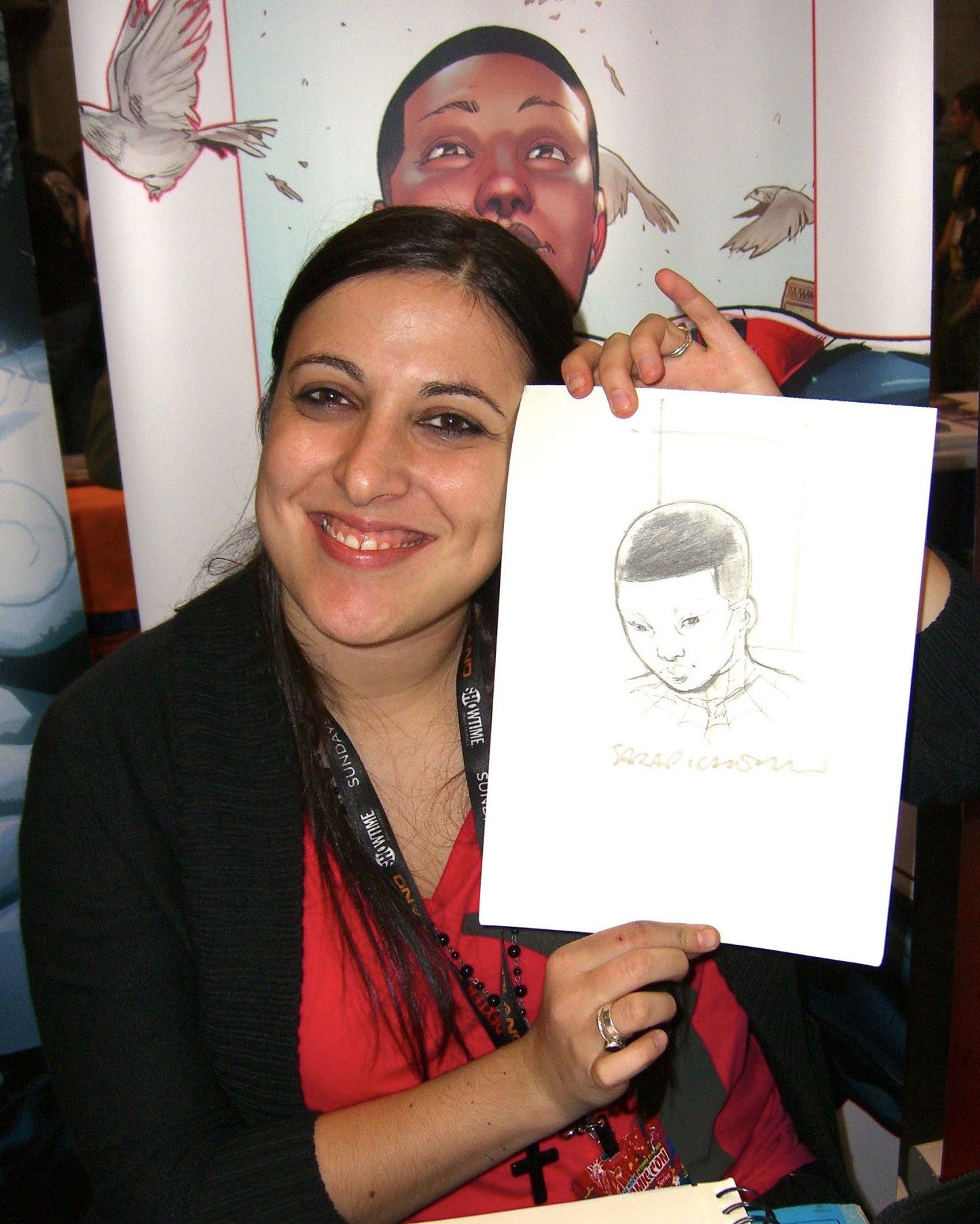
Italian artist Sara Pichelli, who designed Morales, holding a sketch of him at the 2011 New York Comic Con

The concept of an African American Spider-Man was first discussed a few months before the November 2008 election of Barack Obama as President of the United States. Marvel Comics' then-editor-in-chief Axel Alonso describes the catalyst, "When we were planning 'Ultimatum,' we realized that we were standing at the brink of America electing its first African-American President and we acknowledged that maybe it was time to take a good look at one of our icons."

Marvel created Ultimate Marvel in 2000 as an imprint whose continuity is set in a universe separate from the mainstream Marvel universe, in which Marvel's characters were reimagined for a 21st-century audience. Brian Michael Bendis had written Ultimate Spider-Man since 2000. The replacement of the Spider-Man of that continuity was considered as a part of the 2008–09 "Ultimatum" story arc that restructured much of the Ultimate Marvel universe, but those early thoughts were abandoned because the story for that character had not yet been developed. When Marvel's editorial staff decided that the Ultimate universe's Peter Parker would be killed in the 2011 storyline "Death of Spider-Man", the character Miles Morales was created. Although Morales is the first black Spider-Man, he marks the second time a Latino character has taken the Spider-Man identity: Miguel O'Hara, who is of Mexican and Irish descent, was the title character in the 1990s series Spider-Man 2099.

The first appearance of Miles Morales as Spider-Man, from Ultimate Fallout #4 (Aug. 2011)

Miles Morales was created by writer Brian Michael Bendis and Italian artist Sara Pichelli. Bendis's thoughts about the character, and the way he looked in his first appearance, were heavily influenced by African-American actor Donald Glover's appearance in Spider-Man pajamas in "Anthropology 101", the second-season premiere of the television comedy series Community. Bendis said of Glover, "He looked fantastic! I saw him in the costume and thought, 'I would like to read that book.' So I was glad I was writing that book."

In creating the visual look for Miles, Pichelli followed her usual practice of approaching the design by giving thought to the character's personality, including the background that influenced it, and the distinctive traits that he would exhibit, such as the clothing he wears, his body language and expressions. Pichelli also designed Spider-Man's new costume, a mostly black outfit with red webbing and a red spider logo. Pichelli had worked on four issues of Ultimate Spider-Man before she was approached to work on the new title with Miles Morales. Pichelli, who works with a Cintiq 12wx graphic tablet, added more screentones to her illustrations to give what she called "a more 'pop' feeling to the book", which she felt would be fitting to the series.

Morales was born and raised in Brooklyn, New York City, the then-13-year-old son of an African American father and an Afro-Puerto Rican mother. Axel Alonso has described Miles as an intelligent nerd with an aptitude for science similar to his predecessor, Peter Parker.

While established as being Puerto Rican, the race of Rio Morales was initially left ambiguous. Comics writer Cody Ziglar established in the 2024 Miles Morales: Spider-Man Annual that Rio's family were Afro-Puerto Rican, following up on confirmation in a previous interview. In February 2026, Ziglar would additionally confirm that both Rio Morales and Gloria Morales, Miles' grandmother, were Afro-Puerto Rican women, with Gloria specifically having a mixture of Taino, African, and Spanish ancestry.

=== 2010s ===
The character made his debut in the fourth issue of the Ultimate Fallout miniseries, which was released on August 3, 2011. He later starred in the relaunched Ultimate Comics: Spider-Man series, written by Bendis and drawn by Pichelli, in September 2011.

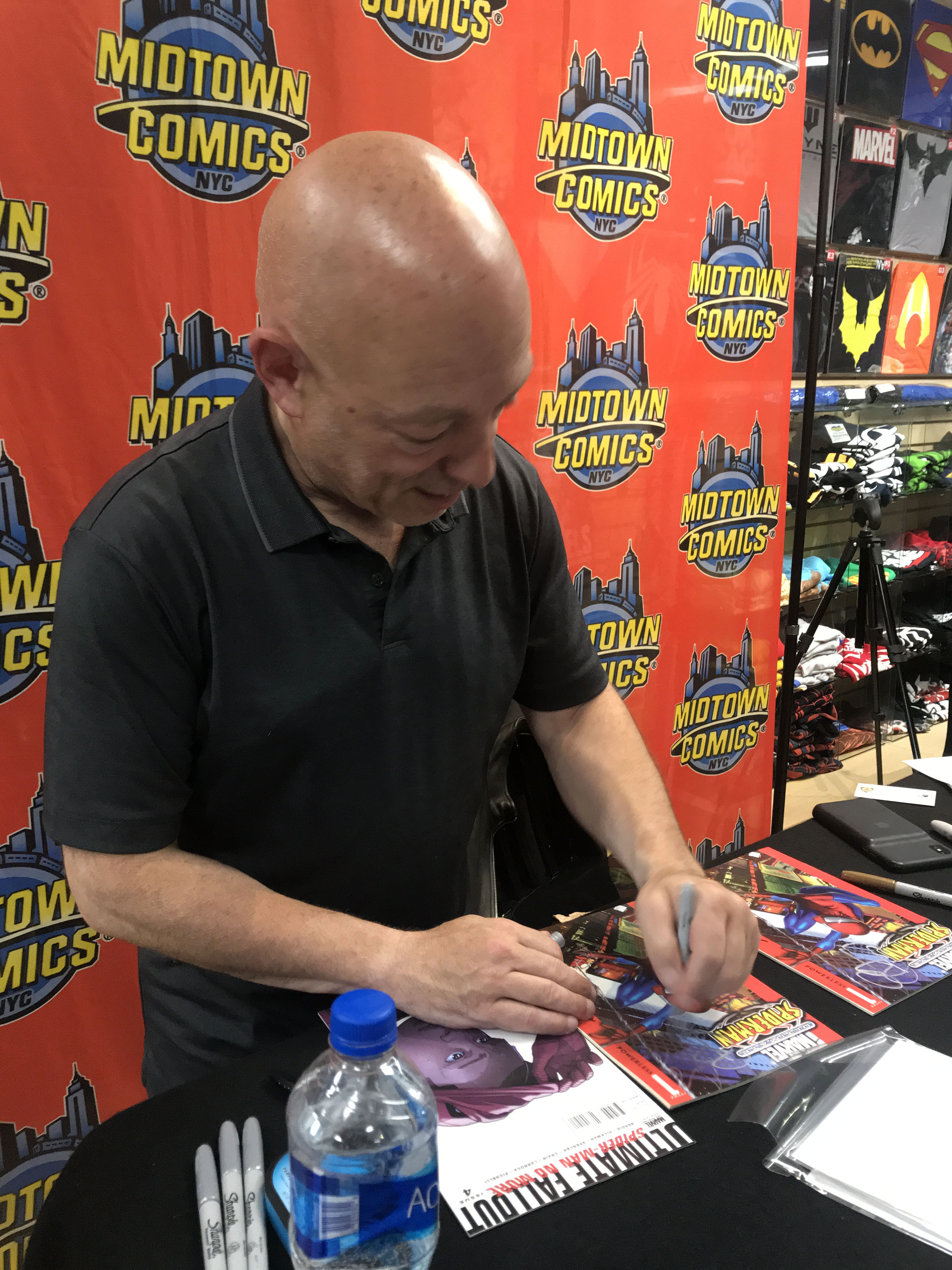
Miles' co-creator, writer Brian Michael Bendis, signing copies of Ultimate Spider-Man and Ultimate Fallout #4, in which Miles Morales first appeared, at Midtown Comics in Manhattan

In contrasting Miles with Peter Parker, Bendis has depicted different conflicts and anxieties for the character. Right after acquiring his superhuman abilities from a spider bite at the home of his uncle, Aaron, whom Miles admires but does not initially know is a career criminal, Miles' father, Jefferson, explains to Miles that before Miles was born, Jefferson and Aaron were thieves who spent time in prison, and that while Jefferson reformed when he got older, Aaron has not. According to Bendis, this gives Miles cause to wonder if the traits that lead to criminal behavior are hardwired into his DNA, leading him to question whether he is essentially a good person or not, and what his future holds for him. These issues further haunt Miles after he becomes disillusioned with Aaron, and Aaron dies from an accidental explosion triggered during a battle between the two of them, saying, "You are just like me" to Miles before dying.

In 2012, Morales appeared in the miniseries Spider-Men, in which he encounters the Spider-Man of the mainstream Marvel universe. In June 2013, the character appeared in the climax of Age of Ultron #10, which was also written by Brian Michael Bendis. Though mostly set in the mainstream Marvel universe, or Earth-616 as it is known in dialogue, the story depicts major changes to the space-time continuum as a result of the time travel on the part of characters, resulting in Miles witnessing the coming of the mainstream Marvel Galactus, an entity that consumes planets, to Earth.

Despite its initial press and critical reception, Ultimate Comics Spider-Man was not a huge hit in the direct market. By August 2013, sales on the title had slipped, and sales for the other two Ultimate titles, Ultimate Comics X-Men and Ultimate Comics The Ultimates, had dropped to numbers at which mainstream Marvel titles are canceled. That November, Ultimate Comics Spider-Man ended its run with issue #28, and the other two titles ended along with it, to make way for the miniseries Cataclysm: Ultimate Spider-Man, one of the books in the crossover storyline "Cataclysm", in which the heroes of the Ultimate universe face the threat of the Earth-616 Galactus. At the conclusion, the Ultimate universe is destroyed, but Miles and his supporting characters are transported to the mainstream Marvel Universe (Earth-616).

Following "Cataclysm", Miles starred in a new title called Miles Morales: Ultimate Spider-Man, again with Bendis as writer, as part of Ultimate Marvel Now, an initiative with which Marvel relaunched the Ultimate Marvel line. Miles Morales was also made a member of the eponymous team in All-New Ultimates, a series written by Michel Fiffe and drawn by Amilcar Pinna. Both series ran for 12 issues. The twelfth and final issue of Miles Morales: Ultimate Spider-Man concluded with a cliffhanger that led directly into the 2015 "Secret Wars" storyline.

Marvel ended the Ultimate Marvel imprint with the "Secret Wars" storyline, in which the Marvel Universe was merged with other alternate universes, including the Ultimate Universe. Following "Secret Wars", Miles was made a character of the mainstream Marvel Universe, and a member of the titular team in All-New, All-Different Avengers. The character featured in the Spider-Verse crossover written by Dan Slott that began in Amazing Spider-Man #9 (2015). The story featured Miles alongside the mainstream version of Peter Parker, as well as Spider-Woman and a huge number of alternate Spider-Men.

The third solo series, titled simply Spider-Man (before being rebranded Spider-Man: Miles Morales), debuted February 3, 2016, with Bendis and Pichelli returning as the creative team. Pichelli would be succeeded by Nico Leon and Oscar Bazaldua. Throughout the storyline, Peter Parker expands the scope of his activities globally, while the now-16-year-old Miles continues to patrol New York City, and deals with issues such as confrontations with Parker's rogues gallery, the public's reaction to his ethnicity, and his love life. Each issue was numbered sequentially beginning with issue 1, and ending with issue 21, when the numbering switched to legacy numbering in order to assume an unbroken numbering from 2000's Ultimate Spider-Man #1, with the following issue continuing with issue 234. In 2017, Miles experiences a brief romance with Spider-Woman (Gwen Stacy).

On November 7, 2017, it was announced that Bendis, having signed an exclusive contract with DC Comics, would be leaving Marvel in early 2018, and Spider-Man: Miles Morales was canceled with issue #240 (May 2018). On September 13, 2018, Marvel announced that Saladin Ahmed and Javier Garron would be the writer and artist, respectively, on a fourth ongoing solo series, Miles Morales: Spider-Man, the first issue of which was released on December 12, 2018, coinciding with the premiere of the animated feature film, Spider-Man: Into the Spider-Verse.

=== 2020s ===
The visual design of Spider-Man: Into the Spider-Verse would reportedly influence a new costume designed by Chase Conley for the character's tenth anniversary in 2021, which included trademark sneakers.

The Miles Morales: Spider-Man series concluded with issue 42 in September 2022. In December 2022 Marvel debuted the next series, Miles Morales: Spider-Man by writer Cody Ziglar and artist Federico Vicentini.

On July 9, 2020, Marvel announced that an original graphic novel, Miles Morales: Shock Waves, would be released in 2021 in partnership with Scholastic, written by Opposite of Always author Justin A. Reynolds, with art by Pablo Leon.

== Fictional character biography ==
In his first public appearance as Spider-Man, Miles Morales foils an assault by Kangaroo a short time after Peter Parker's death. He wears a Spider-Man costume similar to Parker's, but considers changing it when spectators tell him it is in "bad taste".

The opening story arc of Ultimate Comics: Spider-Man, which premiered in September 2011, is set prior to Ultimate Fallout #4, and establishes the character of Miles Morales, a grade-schooler who lives with his mother Rio Morales, a nurse, and his father Jefferson Davis, and details how he received his superhuman abilities. After scientist Dr. Conrad Markus (Note: Markus is established as simply "Dr. Markus" in Ultimate Comics: Spider-Man #1 (November 2011), and his given name is established in Ultimate Comics: Spider-Man #22 (June 2013), though his surname is misspelled "Marcus" in that issue. In a private email, Bendis stated that the first spelling is the correct one.) uses Parker's blood to recreate the formula that created Spider-Man, the Prowler (Aaron Davis, Miles's uncle) steals the formula, and in the process, one of the spiders created by Markus crawls into the Prowler's duffel bag. Days later, Miles is bitten by the spider during a visit to Aaron's apartment. Morales develops superhuman abilities similar to those Peter has, but does not tell his parents, due to his father's distrust of superheroes, confiding only in his best friend Ganke Lee.

Miles, who wants a normal life, is unhappy about having these abilities and resistant to the idea of risking his life to engage in superheroics, a reaction that Bendis wrote to further contrast Miles with Parker. However, after witnessing Spider-Man's death at the Green Goblin's hands, the guilt-ridden Miles realizes he could have helped. After Ganke suggests he assume the Spider-Man mantle, and learns from Gwen Stacy why Parker did what he did, Miles is inspired to try costumed crimefighting.

His first time out, he is confronted not only by those who feel his use of the Spider-Man costume is in bad taste, but also by Spider-Woman over his use of the Spider-Man identity. She unmasks and arrests Miles and takes him to S.H.I.E.L.D. headquarters, where Nick Fury reveals that he knows about Miles and his family, including the criminal activity of Miles' uncle. After Miles helps S.H.I.E.L.D. subdue the escaped supervillain Electro, S.H.I.E.L.D. releases Miles and gives him a modified black-and-red version of the Spider-Man costume, which Ganke feels makes Miles "officially" the new Spider-Man. He also receives the blessing of the Earth-616 Peter Parker during the 2012 Spider-Men miniseries, in which Parker briefly visits the Ultimate Marvel universe and meets Miles. After the media report the emergence of a new Spider-Man, Aaron deduces that it is Miles, and offers to train Miles and work with him. After Aaron uses Miles in his ongoing conflict with the Mexican crime lord Scorpion, Miles realizes he is being exploited, and refuses to assist his uncle further, despite Aaron's threat to inform Jefferson of his secret. This leads to an altercation that results in the malfunction of Aaron's weapons, which explode, killing Aaron.

In subsequent storylines, Miles becomes acquainted with Parker's loved ones, May Parker, Gwen and Mary Jane Watson, who know of his secret identity and give him Parker's web shooters. He also works alongside the Ultimates superhuman team's various members.

In a 2013 storyline, when investigative journalist Betty Brant incorrectly concludes that Miles' father, Jefferson, is the new Spider-Man, she is murdered by Markus, who has become the Venom symbiote's newest host. In the subsequent "Venom War" storyline, Venom critically injures Jefferson. When Venom confronts Spider-Man at the hospital, Rio learns her son is Spider-Man. During the battle, both she and Markus are killed by police gunfire, though before she dies, Rio tells Miles not to reveal his secret to Jefferson. Miles quits being Spider-Man as a result. A year later he has a girlfriend, Kate Bishop, and plans to tell her about his former life as Spider-Man. S.H.I.E.L.D. pressures him to return to that role, and he reluctantly does so, after Ganke and Spider-Woman convince him that there needs to be a Spider-Man.

=== "Cataclysm" ===
In the "Cataclysm" storyline, the mainstream Marvel version of Galactus comes to Miles' Earth to consume it for its energy. Believing the world is ending, Miles reveals his double life to his father, who holds Miles responsible for the deaths of Aaron and Rio, and disowns him. Miles also journeys to the mainstream Marvel universe with Reed Richards to acquire information on how to repel Galactus.

=== Miles Morales: Ultimate Spider-Man ===
In his second solo series, Miles Morales: Ultimate Spider-Man, Miles encounters the presumed-dead Peter Parker, who cannot explain his reappearance, and who does not intend to return to his former life. Together, the two Spider-Men defeat the Goblin, who is also revealed to be alive, but who is killed during the course of the story. After witnessing Miles courageously battle the Goblin, Peter acknowledges Miles a worthy successor, and decides to retire from superheroics for a life with family and Mary Jane.

Miles' father Jefferson reappears, revealing to his son that as young men, Jefferson and Aaron worked for a criminal in the organization of Wilson Fisk, though Jefferson was spying for S.H.I.E.L.D. He afterward declined an offer to join S.H.I.E.L.D., and went on to marry Rio and have Miles. He explains he had fled after learning Miles was Spider-Man because it stirred unresolved issues from that time, and tells Miles he no longer blames him for his mother's death, and regrets abandoning him.

When Miles reveals his secret identity to Katie, the Bishop family is revealed to be sleeper agents for the terrorist group Hydra who then kidnap Miles, his father and Ganke, as part of a plan involving Dr. Doom. Miles and the other prisoners are freed, however, in part with help from Judge (Miles's dorm mate), Maria Hill and other superhuman colleagues.

=== End of Ultimate imprint and merge with Marvel-616 ===
During the events of the 2015 "Secret Wars" storyline, both the Ultimate Marvel universe and the mainstream Earth-616 universe are destroyed. Miles survives the destruction by infiltrating an escape ship designed by the Cabal. After eight years in stasis, Miles awakens on the planet Battleworld, created from the remains of destroyed alternate Earths. He reunites with Earth-616's Peter Parker and the other surviving heroes from that former mainstream-Marvel Earth. They battle Doctor Doom, who with his new powers, appointed himself God Emperor of the planet. At the conclusion of the storyline, the Molecule Man, in gratitude for Miles' earlier compassion, restores Earth-616, with Miles and his family, including his mother, restored to life in the process, among its inhabitants. Aaron is also later revealed to have been restored to life, retaining his knowledge of Miles's dual identity, and becomes the villainous Iron Spider. Both Miles and Peter share the Spider-Man mantle in the new universe, though the now-16-year-old Miles patrols New York City, while Peter acts globally. Miles also joins the latest team of Avengers in the 2016 series All-New, All-Different Avengers,

In this new continuity, Miles and his loved ones initially have no memories of their origins in the Ultimate universe, though Miles eventually learns of his past there, including details such as Rio's "death". Jefferson is aware of his double life, but Rio is not, nor is S.H.I.E.L.D., though Rio eventually learns the truth. Miles' circle of fellow superheroes who know of his double identity expands to include Kamala Khan, the fourth Ms. Marvel, and the former X-Man Fabio Medina, a school roommate of Miles and Ganke. This group of confidants later includes the teen superhero Bombshell. His relationship with Bishop apparently did not occur in this continuity, as Miles begins seeing classmate Barbara Rodriguez, whom he calls his "first serious girlfriend", who is unaware of his double life. Miles becomes a central figure in the 2016–2017 "Civil War II" storyline. Afterward, Miles joins other teen superheroes to form a new incarnation of the Champions, who star in their self-titled series. In the first arc of the 2019 third volume of Champions, after Kamala Khan and Viv Vision are killed in a battle against Zzzax in Dubai, dying along with numerous civilians, Miles arranges for this to be undone by agreeing to Mephisto's offer of a "cosmic do-over", turning back time second-by-second long enough for Miles and Amadeus Cho to restrain Zzzax. This is done at the cost of a bystander's life who Miles had originally saved from falling rubble: in this new timeline, the bystander dies instead of Kamala and Viv. Guilt-ridden, Miles eventually tells Kamala of her death and the cost of her revival, "breaking her heart" and ending their friendship, before leaving the team in issue #4.

=== Miles Morales: Spider-Man ===
In his third solo series Miles Morales: Spider-Man (2019–2022), Miles meets Tiana Toomes, the anti-hero Starling and the granddaughter of the Vulture. The two battle the crime boss Tombstone before forming a romantic relationship and revealing their secret identities to one another.

In the 2023–present relaunch of Miles Morales: Spider-Man, on learning that his granddaughter is dating a Spider-Man, the Vulture breaks out of prison to kill Miles, with Tiana defeating him and proudly declaring Miles to be her boyfriend.

In the 2024 storyline "Blood Hunt", Blade transforms Miles into a vampire. He is later cured by Bast after meeting with Anansi.

After Miles' surviving clone brother Shift begins to learn English, he is named Jaime Morales, after Miles' late grandfather.

== Powers and abilities ==
Bitten by a genetically engineered spider known as specimen 42, which is slightly different from the one that granted Peter Parker superhuman powers, Miles Morales possesses abilities similar to the original Spider-Man's, including enhanced strength, agility, and reflexes, the ability to adhere to walls and ceilings with his hands and feet (even through clothing), and a "spider sense" that warns him of danger with a buzzing sensation in his head. Though his strength and agility are similar to those of the original younger Spider-Man, his spider-sense is not as strong, as it only warns him of immediate danger.

Miles has two abilities that the original Spider-Man does not have: the ability to camouflage himself, including his clothing, to match his surroundings, making him effectively invisible, and a "venom strike" that can temporarily paralyze almost anyone with just a touch. The venom strike does not employ actual venom, but is directed energy conducted through Miles' gloves, and can be used against an opponent at a distance by conducting it through a material in which both Miles and his opponent are in contact, such as the webbing of the Earth-616's Spider-Man. It can break chains being used to restrain Miles and even repel non-ferrous objects, such as plastic Lego bricks. The venom strike is powerful enough to render unconscious a person as large as Hank Pym's Giant-Man. It is powerful enough to drive away the symbiotic villain Venom during Miles's first encounter with the creature, but by their second encounter, Venom has developed such a tolerance to the strike that Miles has to be completely enveloped by the symbiote before the venom strike is able to separate the symbiote from its host. Doctor Octopus also developed a set of tentacles that would not conduct the venom strike. The effect of the venom strike manifests itself a few seconds after it is implemented, and is described by Bendis as being comparable to the feeling of being kicked in the testicles. Miles can effect a more powerful version of the strike, which he calls a "mega venom blast". When Miles employs this ability, his eyes glow with yellow energy, which then explodes outwards in a radiant burst that can not only repel a large group of opponents, but also destroy thick ropes and chains that have been used to restrain him. This application of the strike leaves him "dizzy and useless", and cannot be used multiple times in rapid succession without a "recharging" period for Miles, though he can still make use of the conventional strike against people during this period. The conventional venom strike is mostly useless against the supervillain Armadillo, but during Miles' encounter with that villain, his venom blast manifests itself in a form similar to his webbing, which he uses like a lasso to pull Armadillo towards him and knock him unconscious with a venom strike-powered punch. In Miles Morales: Spider-Man (Vol 2) #5 (May 2023), he gains the ability to manifest an energy sword, apparently composed of the same energy with which he manifests his Venom Punch, which he calls a "Venom-Saber".

Miles' body also possesses a significant resistance to injury. During an altercation with the Roxxon mercenary Taskmaster, Miles is thrown through a brick wall without any apparent serious injury, though the experience is painful for him.

Miles wears a costume given to him by S.H.I.E.L.D., and initially uses Peter Parker's web shooters, which are given to him by May Parker. He is eventually given a new set of webshooters by S.H.I.E.L.D. as well.

== Reception ==
People who say this is a PC stunt miss the point. Miles Morales is a reflection of the culture in which we live. I love the fact that my son Tito will see a Spider-Man swinging through the sky whose last name is "Morales". And judging from the response, I can see I'm not alone.

— Axel Alonso

The character Miles Morales was first reported by USA Today on August 2, 2011, shortly before the character officially debuted in Ultimate Fallout #4. The announcement received international coverage in the mainstream media and was met with mixed reactions by audiences. Chris Huntington of The New York Times lauded the creation of Morales, relating that it gave his adopted Ethiopian son Dagim a superhero who looks like him. The Guardian and Culture Map Houston reported that some fans viewed the decision as an example of political correctness, and that the introduction of a minority Spider-Man was a publicity stunt to attract more readers, while others felt that a person of color as Spider-Man would set a positive example for minority readers, particularly children. Many Spider-Man fans were disappointed that Peter Parker was killed, regardless of who replaced him. The wide-ranging critical reception prompted The Washington Post to run an article called, "Sorry, Peter Parker. The response to the black Spider-Man shows why we need one", in which writer Alexandra Petri wrote that the character should be judged on the quality of its stories rather than on his appearance or ethnicity.

Radio host and conservative pundit Lou Dobbs expressed outrage over the original Spider-Man being replaced by Morales, stating during a television commentary, "Peter Parker, who was a white orphan from Queens, was killed off in June during a fight with his nemesis, the Green Goblin...Marvel Comics saying it's replacing the iconic character with Miles Morales, who is part Latino and part Black." Political satirist Jon Stewart mocked Dobbs' criticism on The Daily Show, while also pointing out that Morales replaced Spider-Man only in the Ultimate universe, and that the original Peter Parker would still be appearing in several titles. Conservative talk show host Glenn Beck, claiming that Miles resembled President Barack Obama, argued that the new Spider-Man was a result of a comment from Michelle Obama about changing traditions. However, Beck said he did not care about Miles' race, and also acknowledged that this was not the mainstream Spider-Man. Axel Alonso denied the character was created out of political correctness, stating "Simple fact is Marvel comics reflect the world in all its shapes, sizes and colors. We believe there's an audience of people out there who is thirsty for a character like Miles Morales." Bendis also denied that the character's ethnicity was an attempt to generate publicity. Original Spider-Man co-creator Stan Lee approved of Miles, stating that "Doing our bit to try to make our nation, and the world, color blind is definitely the right thing."

In a review for the first issue, David Pepose of Newsarama wrote, "The biggest victory that Bendis scores with Miles Morales is that he makes us care about him, and care about him quickly. Even though we're still scratching the surface of what makes him tick, we're seeing the world through his eyes, and it's similar to Peter Parker's but a whole lot tougher. But that kind of Parker-style guilt—that neurotic, nearly masochistic tendency for self-sacrifice that comes with great power and greater responsibility—is still intact." Jesse Schedeen of IGN wrote that "Miles still feels like a bit of an outsider in his own book. Bendis never quite paints a complete picture of Miles—his thoughts, motivations, personality quirks, and so forth. Miles is largely a reactionary figure throughout the book as he confronts struggles like registering for a charter school or dealing with family squabbles." Schedeen also opined that "Miles occupies a more urban, racially diverse, and tense landscape. All the story doesn't pander or lean too heavily on elements like racial and economic tension to move forward. Miles is simply a character who speaks to a slightly different teen experience, and one not nearly as well represented in superhero comics as Peter's". James Hunt of Comic Book Resources rated the issue #1 four and a half out of five stars, lauding Bendis for emphasizing Morales' character and his supporting cast instead of rushing him into costume. The first issue holds a score of 8.0 out of 10 at the review aggregator website Comic Book Roundup, based on 13 reviews, while the final issue, #200, holds a score of 8.4, based on 14 reviews, and the series overall holds an average issue rating of 8.3.

The second solo series, Miles Morales: Ultimate Spider-Man, has an average issue rating of 8.2 out of 10 at Comic Book Roundup, while the third series, Spider-Man, holds a rating of 7.6. His fourth series, Miles Morales: Spider-Man, was released in December 2018. It ran for issues, concluding in late 2022. It holds an 8.1 rating at Comic Book Roundup. His fifth series was the second cycle of Miles Morales: Spider-Man. It premiered in February 2023 with writer Cody Ziglar and artist Federico Vicentini as the creative team. It holds an 8.6 rating at Comic Book Roundup. His sixth series was the third cycle of Miles Morales: Spider-Man.

== Alternate versions ==
=== Ultimatum ===
Miles as Ultimatum, from Miles Morales: Spider-Man #10 (November 2019)

In the 2012 miniseries Spider-Men, the mainstream Marvel Universe Peter Parker briefly visits the Ultimate Marvel universe and meets Miles Morales. This was followed up in the 2017 sequel miniseries Spider-Men II, in which the Earth-616 version of Miles Morales makes his first appearance, and is revealed to be a fully-grown adult with a scarred face. This version of Miles became a close friend and confidant to the mob enforcer Wilson Fisk when he saved Fisk's life in prison, an event that resulted in the scars on Miles' face. Miles worked for Fisk following their time in prison, aiding him during Wilson's violent rise to crime boss in New York. Subsequent to this, after Miles fell in love with a woman named Barbara Sanchez, Fisk arranged to have all traces of Miles' existence erased from searchable records in order help Miles leave his criminal life behind him. Years later, after Barbara died, Fisk informs a grief-stricken Miles that he has knowledge of a parallel universe in which Barbara might still be alive. Miles hires the Taskmaster, who confirms not only that the Ultimate Universe still exists following the events of the "Secret Wars" storyline, but that its version of Barbara is still alive. The adult Miles journeys to the Ultimate Universe to reunite with his lost love, essentially switching places with his younger counterpart.

In a 2019–2020 storyline, Miles takes on the criminal identity of Ultimatum, and having acquired a costume equipped with the size-shifting technology of Giant-Man, returns to the Marvel-616 universe with the Ultimate Universe's Green Goblin as his henchman. He establishes a crime partnership with Fisk, and floods the area with a drug derived from Green Goblin's blood that mutates people into monstrous slaves called Goblinoids. He kidnaps the teenaged Miles and Aaron Davis, and reveals to them the existence of the multiverse. He plans to return Miles and his family to the Ultimate Universe with an interdimensional portal generator, after which he will be free to take over Brooklyn without interference. After the two abductees free themselves, they and their allies battle Ultimatum's forces. During the melee, Aaron induces an explosion that destroys the portal generator and sends the two villains back to the Ultimate Universe, but which kills himself in the process, a loss that devastates Miles.

=== Other versions ===
In Deadpool Killustrated #1 (Jan. 2013), Miles Morales' corpse is seen among those of various Spider-Men across various dimensions of the multiverse that an alternate Deadpool has killed. In the 2014 book Ultimate FF #4, a version of Miles Morales' Spider-Ham is introduced with the name Miles Morhames, who hails from a dimension inhabited by beings that resemble anthropomorphic animals. His origin is similar to the Ultimate version, in that after the death of Peter Porker, Miles Morhames was inspired to become a hero. In the 2017 "Sitting in a Tree" storyline that ran in Spider-Man and Spider-Gwen, Miles is transported to Earth-8, where that dimension's versions of him and fellow costumed crimefighter Gwen Stacy have been married for 20 years, and have two children. In a 2017 storyline that ran in Unbelievable Gwenpool, a future version of Miles Morales whose wife and child were killed after an evil Gwen Poole of the future revealed his and all other superheroes' identities, travels back in time to kill a young Gwen. He accidentally brings the older version of Gwen Poole with him, which leads to her to encounter her younger self. In the 2017 book Venomverse: War Stories #1, a version of Miles appears with other heroes in the world of the Venomized Doctor Doom, in which each person is bonded to a symbiote.

In "Secret Roar", a 2019 story in Spider-Man Annual (Vol. 3) #1, different versions of Earth's superheroes gather together to fight a Celestial, including a feline version of Miles Morales named Meows Morales. He is presumed dead along with most of the heroes after the Celestial destroys their realm.

In the continuity of the 2019 miniseries Spider-Man: Life Story, which depicts the characters of the Marvel Universe aging naturally after 1962, Miles becomes Spider-Man sometime in the 2010s. An elderly Peter Parker discovers that Miles' brain houses the mind of Otto Octavius, who took possession of Miles' body shortly after Miles became Spider-Man, and trapped the young hero in his own dying body (as Octavius had done to Peter in the 2012 Marvel-616 storyline "Dying Wish"). After Peter sacrifices his life in saving Octavius, Octavius switches his and Miles back to their original bodies, after which Miles is given Peter's original Spider-Man costume by Mary Jane Watson.

An elderly Miles Morales appears as the protagonist of the one-shot Miles Morales: The End, which is set in a post-apocalyptic Brooklyn, and casts Miles as "the last bastion of civilization". The book is one of six featuring Marvel characters as part of its The End series, which were announced at the 2019 New York Comic Con for January 2020 release.

In the 2021 "Heroes Reborn" storyline, a change in the timeline results in a continuity in which the Squadron Supreme are Earth's mightiest heroes while the Avengers never existed. In this continuity, after Falcon was killed by the Goblin, Miles used his electrical engineering knowledge to design a flight suit and became the new Falcon. The original Falcon's partner, Nighthawk, still traumatized by his death, refuses to mentor Miles. Miles later forms a team called the Champions with Girl Power (Kamala Khan) and Kid Spectrum (Sam Alexander).

The 2022 miniseries What If...? Miles Morales introduces alternate versions of Miles who became Captain America, Wolverine, Hulk, and Thor. Issue 4, written by Yehudi Mercado and drawn by Paco Medina and Luigi Zagaria, garnered controversy for its stereotypical language and racist depictions of black culture. Mercado, who identifies as Mexican and Jewish, publicly apologized and resolved to work toward effecting greater authenticity in his depiction of minorities.

== In other media ==
=== Television ===
- Miles Morales appears in Ultimate Spider-Man, initially voiced by Donald Glover and subsequently by Ogie Banks. This version is introduced as an alternate equivalent of Spider-Man before he is stranded in Peter Parker's universe, joins the Web Warriors and takes on the alias Kid Arachnid.
- Miles Morales appears in Marvel Super Hero Adventures, voiced by Zac Siewert.
- Miles Morales appears in Spider-Man (2017), voiced by Nadji Jeter. This version is a student at Horizon High who obtains spider abilities after being bitten by a genetically modified spider, after which Peter Parker mentors him. He was originally marketed as Kid Arachnid in promotional releases, but takes on the alias Spy-D later in the series.
- Miles Morales appears in Spidey and His Amazing Friends, voiced initially by Jakari Fraser and by Carter Young in the fourth season onward. This version goes by the alias Spin.

=== Film ===
Writer Brian Michael Bendis stated that he favored adapting Miles Morales into a Spider-Man feature film in some way, as did actor Andrew Garfield. Producers Avi Arad and Matt Tolmach indicated that they did not intend to have Miles appear. But after Marvel brokered a deal with Sony that resulted in the addition of the Spider-Man films in the Marvel Cinematic Universe (MCU), producer Kevin Feige stated that Miles would not appear in the MCU for the foreseeable future but was interested in opportunities to explore the character. Miles is confirmed to exist in the MCU, with Aaron Davis alluding to him in the film Spider-Man: Homecoming. and is again alluded to in Spider-Man: No Way Home when Max Dillon / Electro says "There's gotta be a black Spider-Man somewhere out there" to Peter Parker of The Amazing Spider-Man films. In a 2023 interview, producer Amy Pascal stated that a live-action film starring Miles was in development.

==== Spider-Verse ====
Miles Morales as he appears in Across the Spider-Verse

Miles Morales appears as the main character in the Spider-Verse film series and is voiced by Shameik Moore. This version obtained his powers after being bitten by a genetically modified radioactive spider created in Earth-42, which was transported to his universe by the Kingpin's super-collider.

Additionally, the alternate Earth-42 variant, Miles G. Morales, appears as the Prowler and is voiced by Jharrel Jerome.

=== Video games ===
- Miles Morales's Spider-Man suit appears as an alternate costume for Peter Parker / Spider-Man in Spider-Man: Edge of Time and The Amazing Spider-Man 2.
- Miles Morales as Spider-Man appears as a playable character in Marvel Super Hero Squad Online, voiced by Alimi Ballard.
- Miles Morales as Spider-Man appears as an unlockable playable character in Spider-Man Unlimited.
- Miles Morales as Spider-Man appears as an unlockable playable character in Marvel Avengers Alliance.
- Miles Morales as Spider-Man appears as an unlockable playable character in Marvel Future Fight.
- Miles Morales as Spider-Man appears as an unlockable playable character in the mobile version of Marvel Puzzle Quest.
- Miles Morales as Spider-Man appears as an unlockable playable character in Marvel Contest of Champions.
- Miles Morales as Spider-Man appears as an unlockable playable character in Marvel Avengers Alliance 2.
- Miles Morales as Spider-Man appears as an unlockable playable character in Lego Marvel's Avengers. He is available through the "Spider-Man" DLC pack.
- Miles Morales as Spider-Man appears as an unlockable playable character in Marvel Avengers Academy, voiced by Brandon Winckler.
- Miles Morales as Spider-Man appears as an unlockable "Team-Up" character in Marvel Heroes, voiced again by Ogie Banks.
- Miles Morales as Spider-Man appears as an unlockable playable character in Lego Marvel Super Heroes 2.
- Miles Morales as Spider-Man appears as a playable character and boss in Marvel Ultimate Alliance 3: The Black Order, voiced by Nadji Jeter.
- Miles Morales appears as a playable character in Insomniac Games' Marvel's Spider-Man series, voiced again by Nadji Jeter.
  - He first appears in Marvel's Spider-Man (2018), where he is bitten by a genetically altered spider created by Oscorp and gains spider-like abilities. He later reveals his new powers to Peter Parker who in turn reveals his identity as Spider-Man. In The City That Never Sleeps DLC, Peter begins to train Miles on how to use his powers at the latter's insistence.
  - In Marvel's Spider-Man: Miles Morales, Miles has largely mastered his powers and begun assisting Peter as the second Spider-Man. When Peter leaves New York for several weeks, Miles must learn to become his own Spider-Man as he works to protect his new home, Harlem, from a conflict between the Roxxon Energy Corporation and the Underground criminal group, led by his childhood friend Phin Mason / Tinkerer.
  - In Marvel's Spider-Man 2, Miles struggles with his anger towards Martin Li for indirectly killing his father Jefferson Davis.

=== Miscellaneous ===
Miles Morales appears as the title character of the novel Miles Morales: Spider-Man and its sequel Miles Morales: Suspended, both by Jason Reynolds.

=== Merchandise ===
In March 2018, Sideshow Collectibles debuted a Miles Morales Spider-Man Premium Format Figure, a 17"-tall polystone statue depicting Morales jumping over the gaping jaws of a giant Venom symbiote. The statue features two removal heads, with and without the mask, and an extra hand holding the mask. Upon its release, the statue was priced at $520.

== Collected editions ==
=== By type ===
==== Omnibuses ====
No.	Title	Years covered	Issues collected	Pages	Publication date	ISBN
1	Miles Morales: Ultimate Spider-Man Omnibus	2011-2015	Ultimate Comics Spider-Man #1–28, #16.1; Spider-Men #1–5; Cataclysm: Ultimate Spider-Man #1–3; Ultimate Spider-Man #200; Miles Morales: Ultimate Spider-Man #1–12; material from Ultimate Fallout #4	1,168	19 Jun 2018	Kaare Andrews cover: 978-1302925109
1	Miles Morales: Ultimate Spider-Man Omnibus	2011-2015	Ultimate Comics Spider-Man #1–28, #16.1; Spider-Men #1–5; Cataclysm: Ultimate Spider-Man #1–3; Ultimate Spider-Man #200; Miles Morales: Ultimate Spider-Man #1–12; material from Ultimate Fallout #4	1,168	8 Jul 2020	Kaare Andrews cover: 978-1302925109
1	Miles Morales: Ultimate Spider-Man Omnibus	2011-2015	Ultimate Comics Spider-Man #1–28, #16.1; Spider-Men #1–5; Cataclysm: Ultimate Spider-Man #1–3; Ultimate Spider-Man #200; Miles Morales: Ultimate Spider-Man #1–12; material from Ultimate Fallout #4	1,168	1 Nov 2022	Kaare Andrews cover: 978-1302945718
1	Miles Morales: Ultimate Spider-Man Omnibus	2011-2015	Ultimate Comics Spider-Man #1–28, #16.1; Spider-Men #1–5; Cataclysm: Ultimate Spider-Man #1–3; Ultimate Spider-Man #200; Miles Morales: Ultimate Spider-Man #1–12; material from Ultimate Fallout #4	1,168	1 Nov 2022	Sara Pichelli Venom DM cover: 978-1302945725
2	Spider-Man: Miles Morales Omnibus	2016-2018	Spider-Man (vol. 2) #1–21, Spider-Gwen (vol. 2) #16–18, Spider-Men II #1–5, Spider-Man (vol. 2) #234–240	832	25 Feb 2020	978-1302922887
2	Spider-Man: Miles Morales Omnibus	2016-2018	Spider-Man (vol. 2) #1–21, Spider-Gwen (vol. 2) #16–18, Spider-Men II #1–5, Spider-Man (vol. 2) #234–240	856	20 Dec 2022	Sara Pichelli cover: 978-1302945732
2	Spider-Man: Miles Morales Omnibus	2016-2018	Spider-Man (vol. 2) #1–21, Spider-Gwen (vol. 2) #16–18, Spider-Men II #1–5, Spider-Man (vol. 2) #234–240	856	20 Dec 2022	Patrick Brown DM cover: 978-1302945749
3	Miles Morales: Spider-Man by Saladin Ahmed Omnibus	2018-2022	Miles Morales: Spider-Man (2018) #1–42, Absolute Carnage: Miles Morales #1–3, Amazing Spider-Man (vol. 5) #81 and Miles Morales: The End, material from Free Comic Book Day 2019 (Spider-Man/Venom) #1, Incoming! #1, Amazing Spider-Man (vol. 6) #49 and Miles Morales: Spider-Man Annual #1	1,160	22 Aug 2023	Ernanda Souza cover: 978-1302950781
3	Miles Morales: Spider-Man by Saladin Ahmed Omnibus	2018-2022	Miles Morales: Spider-Man (2018) #1–42, Absolute Carnage: Miles Morales #1–3, Amazing Spider-Man (vol. 5) #81 and Miles Morales: The End, material from Free Comic Book Day 2019 (Spider-Man/Venom) #1, Incoming! #1, Amazing Spider-Man (vol. 6) #49 and Miles Morales: Spider-Man Annual #1	1,160	22 Aug 2023	Taurin Clarke DM cover: 978-1302950798

==== Ultimate Collections ====
No.	Title	Years covered	Issues collected	Pages	Publication date	ISBN
1	Miles Morales: Ultimate Spider-Man Ultimate Collection Book 1	2011-2012	Ultimate Fallout #4; Ultimate Comics: Spider-Man #1–12; Spider-Men #1–5	400	28 Jul 2015	978-0785197782
2	Miles Morales: Ultimate Spider-Man Ultimate Collection Book 2	2012-2013	Ultimate Comics: Spider-Man #13–28, 16.1	384	22 Oct 2015	978-0785197799
3	Miles Morales: Ultimate Spider-Man Ultimate Collection Book 3	2013-2015	Cataclysm: Ultimate Comics Spider-Man #1–3; Ultimate Spider-Man #200; Miles Morales: The Ultimate Spider-Man #1–12	360	8 Dec 2015	978-0785197805

==== Modern Era Epic Collections ====
No.	Title	Years covered	Issues collected	Pages	Publication date	ISBN
1	Hero In Training	2011-2012	Ultimate Comics Spider-Man (2011) #1-12; Spider-Men (2012) #1-5; material from Ultimate Fallout (2011) #4	400	11 Mar 2025	978-1302961053
2	Spider-Man No More	2012-2013	Ultimate Comics Spider-Man (2011) #13-28, 16.1	384	26 Aug 2025	978-1302961060
3	Revivals And Revelations	2013-2015	Cataclysm: Ultimate Spider-Man (2013) #1-3; Ultimate Spider-Man #200; Miles Morales: Ultimate Spider-Man #1-12	368	27 Jan 2026	978-1302961077

==== "New reader" trade paperbacks ====
No.	Title	Years covered	Issues collected	Pages	Publication date	ISBN
1	Miles Morales: Spider-Man	2011-2012	Ultimate Comics: Spider-Man #1–11	240	14 Jul 2019	978-1302918071
2	Miles Morales: With Great Power	2012-2013	Ultimate Comics Spider-Man #11–22, 16.1	296	11 Sep 2019	978-1302919771
3	Miles Morales: Great Responsibility	2013-2014	Ultimate Comics Spider-Man #23–28; Cataclysm: Ultimate Spider-Man #1–3; Ultimate Spider-Man #200	240	25 Feb 2020	978-1302921149
4	Miles Morales: Ultimate End	2014-2015	Miles Morales: Ultimate Spider-Man #1–12	248	6 Jul 2021	978-1302929831
5	Miles Morales: Marvel Universe	2016	Spider-Man (vol. 2) #1–11	248	15 Jun 2022	978-1302945060
6	Miles Morales: Avenging Avenger	2017	Spider-Man (vol. 2) #12–19; Spider-Gwen (vol. 2) #16–18	248	1 Feb 2023	978-1302949679

=== By era ===
==== Ultimate Comics: Spider-Man (2011–2013) ====
No.	Title	Material collected	Format	Pages	Released	ISBN
1	Who is Miles Morales?	Ultimate Comics: Fallout #4, Ultimate Comics: Spider-Man #1–5	HC	144	29 Feb 2012	978-0785157120
1	Who is Miles Morales?	Ultimate Comics: Fallout #4, Ultimate Comics: Spider-Man #1–5	TPB	136	14 Aug 2012	978-0785157137
2	Scorpion	Ultimate Comics: Spider-Man #6–10	HC	120	27 Jun 2012	978-0785157144
2	Scorpion	Ultimate Comics: Spider-Man #6–10	TPB	112	19 Dec 2012	978-0785157151
3	Divided We Fall, United We Stand	Ultimate Comics: Spider-Man #11–18	HC	184	12 Dec 2012	978-0785161752
3	Divided We Fall, United We Stand	Ultimate Comics: Spider-Man #11–18	TPB	184	21 May 2013	978-0785161769
4	Venom War	Ultimate Comics: Spider-Man #16.1, 19–22	HC	144	17 Jul 2013	978-0785165033
4	Venom War	Ultimate Comics: Spider-Man #16.1, 19–22	TPB	144	30 Apr 2014	978-0785165040
5	Spider-Man No More	Ultimate Comics: Spider-Man #23–28	HC	136	14 Feb 2014	978-0785168027
5	Spider-Man No More	Ultimate Comics: Spider-Man #23–28	TPB	136	30 Sep 2014	978-0785167068

==== Miles Morales: Ultimate Spider-Man (2014–2015) ====
No.	Title	Material collected	Format	Pages	Released	ISBN
1	Revival	Miles Morales: Ultimate Spider-Man #1–5, Ultimate Spider-Man #200	TPB	144	4 Nov 2014	978-0785154174
2	Revelations	Miles Morales: Ultimate Spider-Man #6–12	TPB	160	9 Jun 2015	978-0785154181

==== Spider-Man: Miles Morales (2016–2017) ====
Miles Morales' story was relaunched with a new number one in 2016, and the character was established in Marvel's main 616 universe. Brian Michael Bendis continued as writer, with Sara Pichelli providing the art.

No.	Title	Material collected	Format	Pages	Released	ISBN
1	Spider-Man: Miles Morales Vol. 1	Spider-Man (vol. 2) #1–5	TPB	120	7 Sep 2016	978-1846537165
2	Spider-Man: Miles Morales Vol. 2	Spider-Man (vol. 2) #6–11	TPB	136	28 Mar 2017	978-0785199625
	Spider-Man/Spider-Gwen: Sitting in a Tree	Spider-Man (vol. 2) #12–14; Spider-Gwen (vol. 2) #16–18	TPB	136	17 May 2017	978-1302907624
3	Spider-Man: Miles Morales Vol. 3	Spider-Man (vol. 2) #15–21	TPB	160	7 Nov 2017	978-1302905972
4	Spider-Man: Miles Morales Vol. 4	Spider-Man (vol. 2) #234–240	TPB	160	3 Jul 2018	978-1302905989

==== Miles Morales: Spider-Man (2018–2022) ====
No.	Title	Material collected	Format	Pages	Released	ISBN
1	Straight Out Of Brooklyn	Miles Morales: Spider-Man #1–6	TPB	136	16 Jul 2019	978-1302914783
2	Bring On The Bad Guys	Miles Morales: Spider-Man #7–10; material from Free Comic Book Day 2019 (Spider-Man/Venom)	TPB	112	31 Dec 2020	978-1302914790
3	Family Business	Miles Morales: Spider-Man #11–15	TPB	112	21 Jul 2020	978-1302920166
4	Ultimatum	Miles Morales: Spider-Man #16–21	TPB	136	23 Feb 2021	978-1302920173
5	The Clone Saga	Miles Morales: Spider-Man #22–28	TPB	168	14 Sep 2021	978-1302926014
6	All Eyes On Me	Miles Morales: Spider-Man #29–32	TPB	112	18 Jan 2022	978-1302926021
7	Beyond	Miles Morales: Spider-Man #33–36; material from Annual #1	TPB	120	21 Jun 2022	978-1302932657
8	Empire Of The Spider	Miles Morales: Spider-Man #37–42	TPB	144	27 Dec 2022	978-1302933128

==== Miles Morales: Spider-Man (2022-2026) ====
No.	Title	Material collected	Format	Pages	Released	ISBN
1	Trial By Spider	Miles Morales: Spider-Man #1–5	TPB	178	1 Aug 2023	978-1302948528
	Carnage Reigns	Carnage Reigns Alpha; Miles Morales: Spider-Man #6–7, Carnage #13–14, Red Goblin #5; Carnage Reigns Omega	TPB	200	26 Sep 2023	978-1302954222
2	Bad Blood	Miles Morales: Spider-Man #8–12	TPB	112	27 Feb 2024	978-1302948535
3	Gang War	Miles Morales: Spider-Man #13–16; Giant Size Spider-Man (2024)	TPB	112	13 Aug 2024	978-1302954697
4	Retribution	Miles Morales: Spider-Man #17–20; Web of Spider-Man (vol. 3) #1 (Miles Morales: Spider-Man story)	TPB	144	29 Oct 2024	978-1302954772
5	Blood Hunt	Miles Morales: Spider-Man #21–24, Annual (2024)	TPB	144	11 Feb 2025	978-1302958459
6	Webs Of Wakanda	Miles Morales: Spider-Man #25–30	TPB	112	13 May 2025	978-1302960858
	Miles Morales: Spider-Man / Deadpool - Pools Of Blood	Deadpool (vol. 10) #11-12; Miles Morales: Spider-Man #30-31	TPB	112	4 Nov 2025	978-1302964924
7	God War	Miles Morales: Spider-Man #32-36	TPB	112	2 Dec 2025	978-1302960865
8	Revenge Of Rabble	Miles Morales: Spider-Man #37-42	TPB	144	16 Jun 2026	978-1302963330

==== Miniseries and one-shots ====
No.	Title	Material collected	Format	Pages	Released	ISBN
	Cataclysm: The Ultimates' Last Stand	Cataclysm: Ultimate Spider-Man #1–3; Cataclysm: The Ultimates' Last Stand #1–5; Cataclysm: Ultimate X-Men #1–3; Cataclysm: Ultimates #1–3; Hunger #1–4; Cataclysm #0.1; Survive #1	HC	440	18 Mar 2014	978-0785189190
	Cataclysm: The Ultimates' Last Stand	Cataclysm: Ultimate Spider-Man #1–3; Cataclysm: The Ultimates' Last Stand #1–5; Cataclysm: Ultimate X-Men #1–3; Cataclysm: Ultimates #1–3; Hunger #1–4; Cataclysm #0.1; Survive #1	TPB	440	17 Feb 2015	978-0785189206
	Spider-Men	Spider-Men #1–5	HC	120	28 Nov 2012	978-0785165330
	Spider-Men	Spider-Men #1–5	TPB	120	17 Feb 2015	978-1846535208
	Spider-Men II	Spider-Men II #1–5	TPB	116	21 Mar 2018	978-1846538704
	Spider-Men: Worlds Collide	Spider-Men #1–5, Spider-Men II #1–5	TPB	240	30 Nov 2021	978-1302931971
	Absolute Carnage: Miles Morales	Absolute Carnage: Miles Morales #1–3; Absolute Carnage: Weapon Plus #1	TPB	112	28 Jan 2020	978-1302920142
	Spider-Verse: Spider-Zero	Spider-Verse (vol. 3) #1–6	TPB	136	28 Jul 2020	978-1302920265
	The End	Miles Morales: The End #1; Captain America: The End #1; Captain Marvel: The End #1; Deadpool: The End #1; Doctor Strange: The End #1; Venom: The End #1	TPB	200	25 Aug 2020	978-1302924997
	Infinite Destinies	Miles Morales: Spider-Man Annual #1; Iron Man Annual (vol. 3) #1; Captain America Annual (vol. 3) #1; Thor Annual (vol. 5) #1; Black Cat Annual (vol. 2) #1; Avengers Annual (vol. 5) #1; Guardians of the Galaxy Annual (vol. 4) #1; Amazing Spider-Man Annual (vol. 4) #2	TPB	264	16 Nov 2021	978-1302931506
	What If...? Miles Morales	What If...? Miles Morales #1–5	TPB	128	13 Sep 2022	978-1302946036
