= Nadji Jeter =

Jamaican-American actor

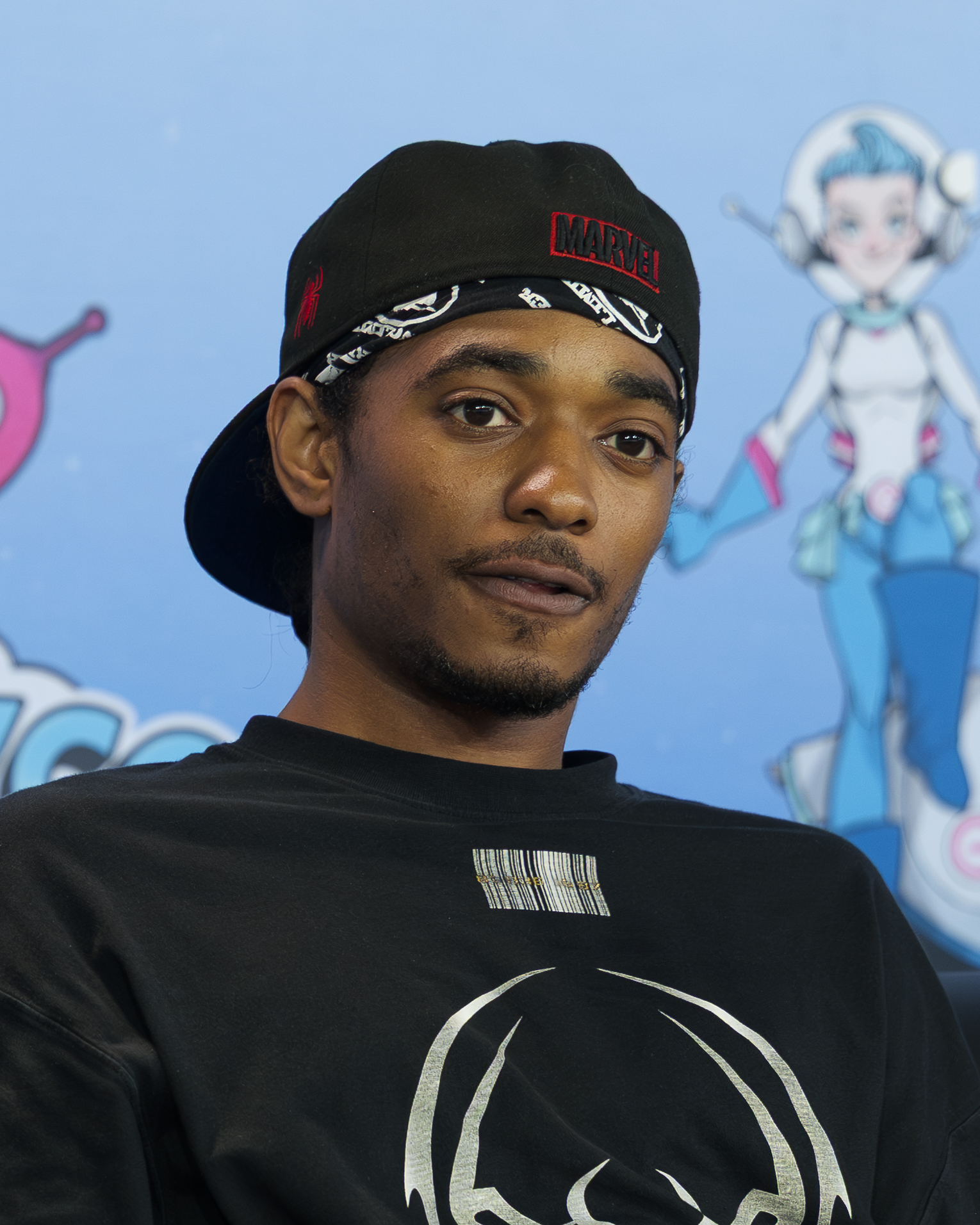
- Jeter at GalaxyCon Nashville in 2026
- Born: October 18, 1996 (age 30); Atlanta, Georgia, U.S.
- Occupation: Actor
- Years active: 2006–present

Nadji Anthony Jeter (born October 18, 1996) is an American actor. He is best known for providing the voice and motion capture for Sam in the action-adventure video game The Last of Us (2013) and Miles Morales in several Marvel projects since 2017, most notably the Marvel's Spider-Man series by Insomniac Games, and his supporting role as Andre in Grown Ups (2010) and Grown Ups 2 (2013). In 2021, Jeter received a nomination for the BAFTA Award for Performer in a Leading Role, as well as won the D.I.C.E. Award for Outstanding Achievement in Character, for his performance as Miles Morales in the 2020 video game Marvel's Spider-Man: Miles Morales. Three years later, Jeter won the BAFTA award, as well as his second D.I.C.E. Award, for his reprisal of the role in Marvel's Spider-Man 2.

== Early life ==
Nadji Anthony Jeter was born in Atlanta, Georgia, on October 18, 1996. At a young age, his parents noticed that he was talented in dancing, acting, and comedy. At age nine, Jeter performed as a dancer at Usher's New Look Foundation Gala. He also performed as a dancing mascot for the Atlanta Hawks of the NBA. In 2007, Jeter moved to Los Angeles to pursue his career.

== Career ==
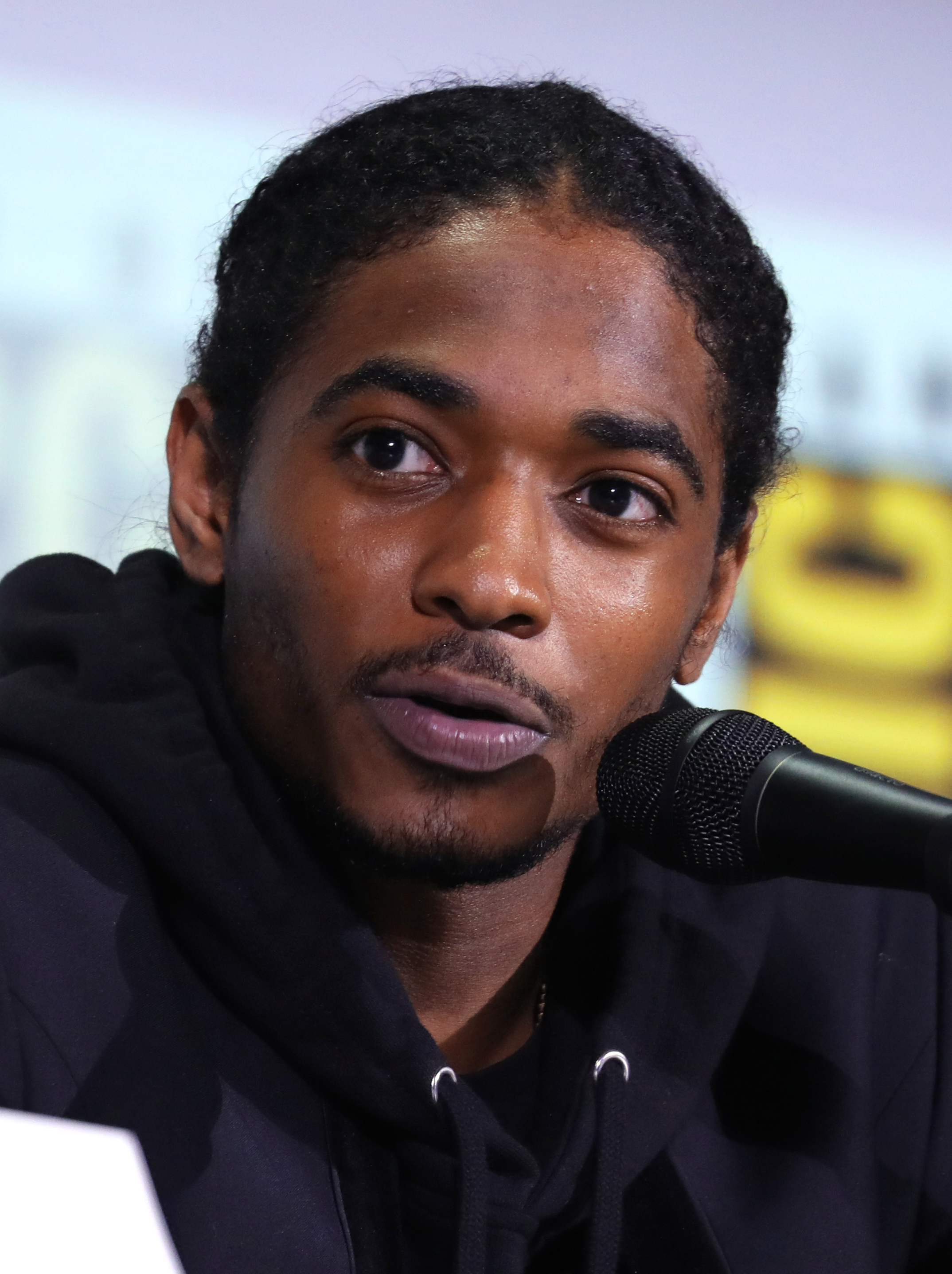
Jeter at San Diego Comic-Con in July 2023

Among his most popular roles are the voices of Sam in the action-adventure video game The Last of Us (2013) and Miles Morales in the animated series Spider-Man (2017) and the video games Marvel's Spider-Man (2018), Marvel Ultimate Alliance 3: The Black Order (2019), Marvel's Spider-Man: Miles Morales (2020), and Marvel's Spider-Man 2 (2023). Jeter has live-action credits such as guest roles on episodes of the medical drama series Grey's Anatomy (2007) and the sitcom Everybody Hates Chris (2008). He appeared in the comedy films Grown Ups (2010) and Grown Ups 2 (2013), as well as the sitcom Reed Between the Lines (2011–2015). Jeter has also starred in various national commercials and was the face of Coca-Cola in 2011.

== Personal life ==
Jeter is a Star Power Ambassador for the Starlight Children's Foundation. He has been involved in Usher's New Look Foundation since the age of six, receiving the 2013 Global Youth Leadership Award for his work with the foundation.

=== Legal issues ===
In January 2015, Jeter was arrested at the age of 18 for allegedly driving under the influence of marijuana in Burbank, California. According to reports, he spent a night in jail before being released.

== Filmography ==
=== Film ===
Year	Title	Role	Notes
2006	Dirty Laundry	Boy 1	
2006	Beats Style and Flavor	Performer	Uncredited role
2008	Lower Learning	Sling Shot Kid	Uncredited role
2009	Opposite Day	Jasper	
2010	Grown Ups	Andre McKenzie	
2013	Grown Ups 2	Andre McKenzie	
2016	The Fifth Wave	Poundcake	
2016	Dance Camp	Hunter	
2017	Wonder	Justin Hollander	
2021	The Runner	Blake	
TBA	Grown Ups 3	Andre McKenzie	Filming

=== Television ===
Year	Title	Role	Notes
2007	Grey's Anatomy	Bobby	Episode: "A Change Is Gonna Come"
2008	Everybody Hates Chris	Guy / Jason	2 episodes
2009	The Forgotten	Football Kid #2	Episode: Prisoner Jane"
2011	Reed Between the Lines	Keenan Reynolds	Main role
2013	Castle	Joey Malone	Episode: "Under the Influence"
2015	Jessie	Terry	Episode: "Basket Cases"
2015	Last Man Standing	Brandon Larabee	Episode: "Vanessa Fixes Up Eve"
2017	Bobbi Kristina	Nick Gordon	Television film
2017–2020	Spider-Man	Miles Morales / Spy-D, additional voices	Main role; 39 episodes

=== Video games ===
Year	Title	Role	Notes
2013	The Last of Us	Sam	Voice and motion capture
2018	Marvel's Spider-Man	Miles Morales	Voice and motion capture
2019	Marvel Ultimate Alliance 3: The Black Order	Miles Morales / Spider-Man	Voice and motion capture
2020	Marvel's Spider-Man: Miles Morales	Miles Morales / Spider-Man	Voice and motion capture
2023	Marvel's Spider-Man 2	Miles Morales / Spider-Man	Voice and motion capture

== Awards and nominations ==
Year	Award	Category	Nominated work	Result	Ref.
2020	British Academy Games Awards	Performer in a Leading Role	Marvel's Spider-Man: Miles Morales	Nominated	
2020	D.I.C.E. Awards	Outstanding Achievement in Character	Marvel's Spider-Man: Miles Morales	Won	
2024	D.I.C.E. Awards	Outstanding Achievement in Character	Marvel's Spider-Man 2	Won	
2024	British Academy Games Awards	Performer in a Leading Role	Marvel's Spider-Man 2	Won	
