= Annemarie Düringer =

Swiss actress (1925–2014)

Annemarie Düringer (26 November 1925 – 26 November 2014) was a Swiss actress. She was born in Arlesheim, Basel-Landschaft.

The daughter of a Swiss industrialist, she graduated from Cours Simon, Paris in 1946, and from the Max Reinhardt Seminar in Vienna the following year, in 1947. In 1949 she became a member of the prestigious Vienna Burgtheater where she played major roles such as Queen Elisabeth in Schiller's Maria Stuart. She remained in the ensemble of this theatre until her death. In 2004 she became patron of the Murau festival Shakespeare in Styria founded by Nicholas Allen and Rudolph J. Wojta.

She received numerous awards, including the Decoration for Services to the Republic of Austria. She died on her 89th birthday in Baden bei Wien, Lower Austria.

== Filmography ==
| Year | Title | Role | Notes |
|---|---|---|---|
| 1953 | Grandstand for General Staff | Komtesse Julia Kopsch-Grantignan | |
| 1953 | Du bist die Welt für mich | Christine Elsner | |
| 1954 | Prisoners of Love | Maria, seine Frau | |
| 1954 | The Eternal Waltz | Adele | |
| 1955 | Secrets of the City | Annie Lauer | |
| 1955 | Ein Mann vergißt die Liebe | | |
| 1955 | The Plot to Assassinate Hitler | Hildegard Klee - Sekretärin im OKW | |
| 1955 | Sergeant Borck | Erna Lucht | |
| 1956 | Before Sundown | Inken Peters | |
| 1957 | The Devil Strikes at Night | Helga Hornung | |
| 1957 | Count Five and Die | Rolande Hertog | |
| 1958 | The Cheese Factory in the Hamlet | Annelie vom Berghof | |
| 1959 | SOS Gletscherpilot | Monica | |
| 1960 | Anne Bäbi Jowäger - I. Teil: Wie Jakobli zu einer Frau kommt | Sophie | |
| 1961 | The Liar | Annemarie Karsten | |
| 1962 | Anne Bäbi Jowäger - II. Teil: Jakobli und Meyeli | Sophie | |
| 1970 | Dällebach Kari | Frau Jenny, Wirtin | |
| 1972 | Der Fall | Frl. Gretz | |
| 1974 | Perahim - die zweite Chance | | |
| 1976 | Shadow of Angels | Luise Müller | |
| 1977 | The Lacemaker | Pomme's mother | |
| 1980 | Berlin Alexanderplatz | Cilly | 4 episodes |
| 1982 | Veronika Voss | Dr. Marianne Katz | |
| 2002 | Gebürtig | Amalie Katz | |
| 2006 | Klimt | Klimt's Mother | |
| 2006 | Late Bloomers | Frieda Eggenschwyler | |
| 2009 | Vision | Äbtissin Tengwich | |
| 2013 | Lovely Louise | Louise | (final film role) |

== Honours and awards ==
- National Film Award for "Night, when the Devil came" (Best Supporting Actress, 1958)
- Actress nomination for chamber (1963)
- Hans-Reinhart-Ring (1974)
- Kainz Medal (1977)
- Austrian Cross of Honour for Science and Art, 1st class (1977)
- Grand Decoration of Honour for Services to the Republic of Austria (1985)
- Honorary Gold Medal of Vienna
- Alma-Seidler-Ring (2000)
- Doyenne of the Burgtheater (2001)
- Gold Medal of Honour for Services to the City of Vienna (2005)
