= Jim Pirri =

American actor

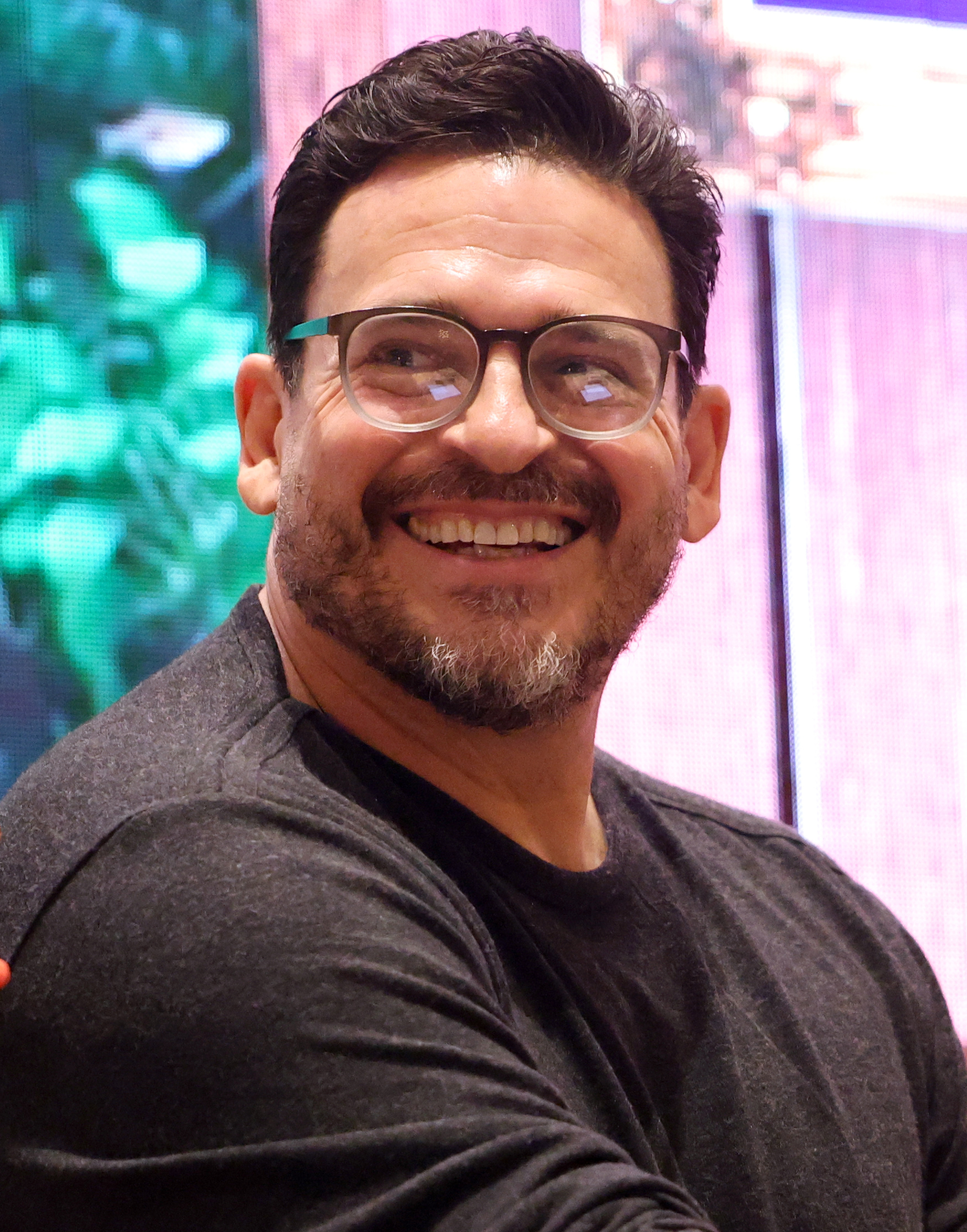
- Pirri in 2025
- Born: September 4, 1964 (age 62); Lakewood, Colorado, U.S.
- Occupations: Actor; fight choreographer
- Years active: 1989–present

James Pirri (born September 4, 1964) is an American actor and fight choreographer. He served as a voice actor in several animated series, films, and video games, and is best known for portraying Angelo Bronte in Red Dead Redemption 2, Luca Cocchiola in Battlefield 1, Rais in Dying Light, Boozer in Days Gone, and Kraven the Hunter in Marvel's Spider-Man 2. He has also acted on TV shows such as David Vega in Victorious and Uncle Frank in Shake It Up. Pirri grew up in Italy, and has often portrayed and voiced Italian characters.

== Biography and career ==
The son of a linguist, Pirri grew up in Italy and is also fluent in Italian. He studied theatre at the University of Colorado, although he was an engineering major. He had roles in the 1987 Colorado Shakespeare Festival and played Guildenstern in the 1988 Colorado Shakespeare Festival production of Hamlet.

He has also worked on many of Dan Schneider's shows, first as Mario on an episode of iCarly, second as André on an episode of Zoey 101, as well as the recurring David Vega in Victorious. He has also appeared on several other TV shows, such as Disney Channel's Shake It Up as a recurring character named Uncle Frank, as well as appearances on CSI: Crime Scene Investigation, Chuck, The O.C., Friends, and 3rd Rock From the Sun. Pirri also portrayed the character Rais, the main antagonist of Dying Light.

In 2016, he portrayed Commander Akeel Min Riah in Call of Duty: Infinite Warfare.

In 2018, he portrayed Angelo Bronte, an Italian crime boss, in Red Dead Redemption 2.

In 2019, he portrayed William "Boozer" Gray, best friend of protagonist Deacon St. John, in Days Gone.

In 2020, he appeared on The Owl House as Alador Blight.

In May 2023, Pirri confirmed at the time of the release of the newest trailer and gameplay footage for Marvel’s Spider-Man 2 at the 2023 PlayStation Showcase that he had obtained the role of Kraven the Hunter.

== Filmography ==
=== Films ===
Year	Title	Role	Notes
1989	Bicycle Safety Camp	Sam Sprocket	Educational video
1989	The Wizard	Studio Tour Guide	
1990	Welcome Home, Roxy Carmichael	Jim Reese	
1994	Ring of Steel	Brian	
1996	The Dark Mist	Opal	
1997	Perfect Target	Miguel Ramirez	Video
2011	Collaborator	Officer Revel	
2014	Audrey	Pierre	
2014	The Fault in Our Stars	Voice Cast	
2014	Penguins of Madagascar	Gondolier (voice)	
2015	The Hunted	Muppet / Jim	
2016	Leap	Blake's Dad	Short film
2018	Salt Water	Coach Ferris	
2018	Suicide Squad: Hell to Pay	Vandal Savage, Count Vertigo (voices)	
2021	Luca	Mr. Branzino (voice)	
2021	Batman: The Long Halloween	Sal Maroni (voice)	
2022	Rise of the Teenage Mutant Ninja Turtles: The Movie	Krang One, Soldiers (voice)	

=== Television ===
Year	Title	Role	Notes
1991	Harry and the Hendersons	Fabrizio	Episode: "The Day After"
1991	Gabriel's Fire	Lanny	Episode: "First Date"
1991	Baby Talk	Baby Ernest	Episode: "The Whiz Kid"
1991	DEA	Body Guard	Episode: "White Lies"
1991	Fever	Dexter's Bartender	Television film
1992	Beverly Hills, 90210	Burke Cahill	Episode: "A Competitive Edge"
1992	Santa Barbara	Enzo	2 episodes
1992–93	Reasonable Doubts	Asher Roth	Recurring role
1993	Diagnosis Murder	Dante Reynaldo	Episode: "Inheritance of Death"
1994	Thunder in Paradise	Jean LaFue the Pirate	Episode: "Plunder in Paradise"
1994	Valley of the Dolls	Jean-Claude	Main role
1994	Without Warning	Robert Marino	Television film
1995	Murder, She Wrote	Muhamed Nasir Hasan	Episode: "Death 'N Denial"
1995	Lois & Clark: The New Adventures of Superman	Agent Dan Scardino	3 episodes
1996	Family Matters	Jake	Episode: "A Ham is Born"
1996	Cybill	Porn Actor	Episode: "Cybill Does Diary"
1996	Home Improvement	Greg Burton	Episode: "No Place Like Home"
1997	Friends	Sergei	Episode: "The One Where Ross and Rachel Take a Break"
1997	3rd Rock from the Sun	Antonio / Michel	2 episodes
1997–98	Union Square	Jack Pappas	Main role
1998	JAG	Luscino Antinori	Episode: "Going After Francesca"
1998	Millennium	Rowdy Beeman	Episode: "Thirteen Years Later"
1998	The Love Boat: The Next Wave	Jeremy	Episode: "All That Glitters"
1999	And the Beat Goes On: The Sonny and Cher Story	Buddy Black	Television film
2000	The Others	Sandy Molian	Episode: "The Others"
2000	Just Shoot Me!	Steve	Episode: "The Pirate of Love"
2000	The Practice	Wayne Mayfield	Episode: "Honorable Man"
2000	Normal, Ohio	Steve	Episode: "Buyer's Remorse"
2001	Nash Bridges	Chet Shedmont	Episode: "Out of Miami"
2001	Providence	Peter Calcatera	4 episodes
2001	FreakyLinks	Gil	Episode: "Subject: Sunrise at Sunset Streams"
2001	The Geena Davis Show	Priest	Episode: "Girl's Night Out"
2001	The Hunted	Mikey	Episode: "Two for One"
2003	She Spies	Craig Zinn	Episode: "First Date"
2003	NCIS	Former Ensign Randy Wiles	Episode: "The Curse"
2003	10-8: Officers on Duty	Det. DiCristoforo	Episode: "Late for School"
2004	Charmed	Corr	Episode: "Witch Wars"
2005	Alias	Yuri Korelka / Tom	Episode: "Welcome to Liberty Village"
2005	CSI: NY	Bernardo Espargosa	Episode: "Blood, Sweat and Tears"
2005	Zoey 101	Andre	Episode: "Haunted House"
2006	Without a Trace	Mitch	Episode: "Rage"
2007	The O.C.	Patrick	Episode: "The End's Not Near, It's Here"
2007	Chuck	Father	Episode: "Chuck Versus the Intersect"
2007	Cavemen	Jake	Episode: "The Shaver"
2008	iCarly	Mario	Episode: "iPie"
2009	CSI: Miami	Judge Gregory Thorpe	Episode: "Presumed Guilty"
2010–12	Victorious	David Vega	Recurring role
2011	CSI: Crime Scene Investigation	Roderick Hammerbacher	Episode: "A Kiss Before Frying"
2011	Shake It Up	Uncle Frank	3 episodes
2012	Malibu Country	Bartender	Episode: "Baby Steps"
2013	NCIS: Los Angeles	Donald Banks	Episode: "Iron Curtain Rising"
2015	Young & Hungry	Dmitri	Episode: "Young & Moving"
2015	Major Crimes	Jonathan Harrison	Episode: "Personal Effects"
2015	The Exes	Mike	Episode: "Along Came Holly"
2015	Star vs. the Forces of Evil	Voice	Episode: "Storm the Castle"
2016	The Cheerleader Murders	Keith	Television film
2016	Bones	Declan Marshall	Episode: "The Stiff in the Cliff"
2017	Lethal Weapon	Angelo Casciano	Episode: "Brotherly Love"
2016–18	Trollhunters: Tales of Arcadia	Additional Voices	6 episodes
2017–18	DreamWorks Dragons	Additional Voices	6 episodes
2019	Love, Death & Robots	Master Sergeant (voice)	Episode: "Shape-Shifters"
2019	Batwoman	Bertrand Eldon / Executioner	Episode: "I'll Be Judge, I'll Be Jury"
2020	Wizards: Tales of Arcadia	Additional Voices	4 episodes
2020–22	The Owl House	Alador Blight (voice)	5 episodes
2024	Batman: Caped Crusader	Emerson Collins, Mr. Moorehouse (voice)	Episode: "The Stress of Her Regard"

=== Video games ===
Year	Title	Role	Notes
2004	World of Warcraft	Nathanos Blightcaller	
2011	L.A. Noire	Carlo Arquero	also motion capture
2011	Captain America: Super Soldier	Allied Forces, HYDRA Forces	
2012	Diablo III	Dark Cultist-Various Monsters	
2013	Lost Planet 3	Col. Caleb Isenberg	
2013	Grand Theft Auto V	Various	
2014	The Amazing Spider-Man 2	Task Force Brute, Russian Brute	
2014	Murdered: Soul Suspect	Additional voices	
2015	Heroes of the Storm	Raven Lord	
2015	Dying Light	Rais	
2015	The Order: 1886	Additional voices	
2015	Rise of the Tomb Raider	Additional voices	
2016	Uncharted 4: A Thief's End	Additional voices	
2016	Mafia III	Additional voices	
2016	Mirror's Edge: Catalyst	Noah	
2016	Final Fantasy XV	Regis Lucis Caelum CXIII	English dubAlso Episode Ignis and Episode Ardyn DLC
2016	World of Warcraft: Legion	Melris Malagan, Nathanos Blightcaller	
2016	Battlefield 1	Old Luca Vincenzo Cocciola	
2016	Call of Duty: Infinite Warfare	Akeel Min Riah	voice and Motion Capture
2017	Injustice 2	Mr. Freeze	
2017	Knack II	Rothari	
2017	Middle-earth: Shadow of War	Humans, Nemesis Orcs	
2017	Wolfenstein II: The New Colossus	John Anderson	
2018	God of War	Additional voices	
2018	Thief of Thieves	Casimiro Pavoni	
2018	Lego DC Super-Villains	Calendar Man	
2018	Red Dead Redemption 2	Angelo Bronte	Voice and motion capture
2019	Days Gone	William "Boozer" Gray	voice and Motion Capture
2020	Star Wars: Squadrons	Shen	
2020	World of Warcraft: Shadowlands	Nathanos Blightcaller	
2022	God of War Ragnarök	Birgir	
2022	Return to Monkey Island	Flambe	
2023	Diablo IV	Creatures	
2023	Spider-Man 2	Sergei Kravinoff / Kraven the Hunter, Dimitri Smerdyakov / Chameleon. also Motion Capture	
2024	Suicide Squad: Kill the Justice League	Rick Flag	
2024	Batman: Arkham Shadow	Spangler, Graves	
2026	God of War Sons of Sparta	Brasidas	
2026	Star Wars: Zero Company	Neesh Renark	
