= Marek Oravec =

Austrian actor

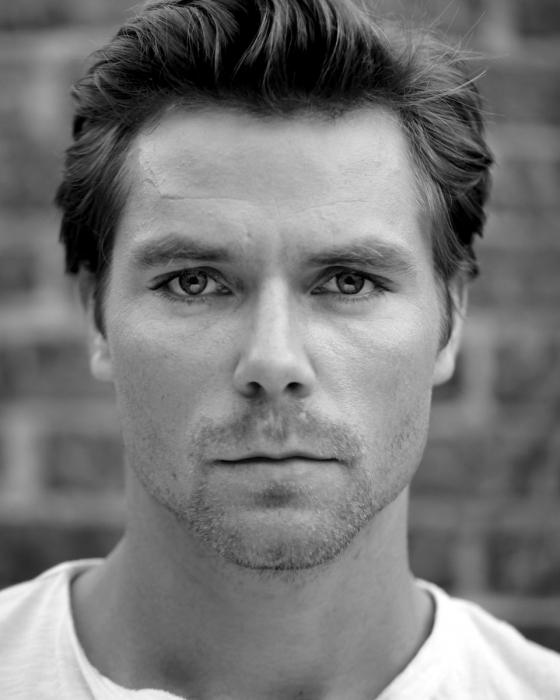
Marek Main

Marek Oravec (born December 27, 1983) is an Austrian actor, living and working in London.

== Career ==
At the beginning of his career the actor was cast in three major roles at the Murau festival Shakespeare in Styria performed in English: In 2006 he was Caliban in a Nicholas Allen production of The Tempest, in 2007 and in 2009 he performed the male leading roles in Romeo and Juliet and in Macbeth, both directed by Daniel Winder.

Since 2005, Oravec lives and works in London, Great Britain where he graduated from Drama Centre London. His debut in England was the title role in Goethe's Faust, directed by Cecil Hayter at the London Tabard Theatre. In 2011 he performed at the Royal National Theatre in The Kitchen by Arnold Wesker, directed by Bijan Sheibani.

As well as regular roles in film productions, Oravec performs for British TV productions such as the action series Crossing Lines, the daily soap Doctors, the procedural comedy-drama New Tricks and the science fiction series Torchwood. Furthermore, he joined Anna Friel in the TV drama The Psychopath Next Door and went on to star in the hit Swedish drama Modus. He appeared in the Killing Eve episode, "Oh Goodie, I'm the Winner".

His feature film roles include appearances in Captain America: The First Avenger as Jan, Fury, and Our Kind of Traitor as Andrei.

== Acting credits ==
- 2005: Kampl
- 2007: The Dinner Party - Marek
- 2008: Torchwood - Worker (uncredited; episode: "Meat")
- 2008: Valkyrie (uncredited)
- 2008: Londongrad - Alexander Pilipenko (short by Wilf Varvill)
- 2008: Flow of Europe - Kristophe (short)
- 2009: Jean Charles - Iatzek
- 2009: New Tricks - Tomas (episode: "Fresh Starts")
- 2009: Doctors - Aleksy Zalewski (episode: "A Manny About the House")
- 2010: Foyle's War - Ivan Spiakov (episode: "The Russian House")
- 2011: Captain America: The First Avenger - Jan
- 2011: National Theatre Live: The Kitchen - Hans
- 2012: The Tragedy of Macbeth - Macbeth
- 2013: Get Lucky - Niko
- 2013: Company of Heroes 2 (video game; voice)
- 2013: Crossing Lines - Yan (two episodes)
- 2013: The Psychopath Next Door - Barman
- 2014: Action - The Director (short)
- 2014: Fury - SS Officer
- 2015: Modus - Richard Forrester (eight episodes)
- 2016: Our Kind of Traitor - Andrei
- 2016: Battlefield 1 (video game; voice)
- 2018: The Guernsey Literary and Potato Peel Pie Society - German Officer
- 2021: Me, Myself and Di - Bentley
- 2022: Killing Eve - Hans (episode: "Oh Goodie, I'm the Winner")
- 2022: Vampire: The Masquerade – Bloodhunt - Additional Characters (video game; voice)
- 2022: A Midsummer Night's Dream - Theseus
- 2023: Amnesia: The Bunker - Crater Soldier (video game; voice)

== Award ==
- 2012 Best Feature Film Actor at the LA INDIE Film Festival (for the title role in The Tragedy of Macbeth)
