= Werner Pawlok =

German artist and photographer (born 1953)

Werner Pawlok (born 1953 in Stuttgart) is a German artist and photographer known for his celebrity and art photography, especially for his work with the 20×24-inch Polaroid Camera.

== Work ==
Werner Pawlok started his first studio in 1977 as a self-taught photographer. In the same year he became a tutor at the Academy of Fine Arts in Stuttgart.

Crying Monkey, 1992 © Werner Pawlok

In 1984 he became the first western photographer to work officially in East-Germany with East-German models. He collaborated with the Fashion Designer Helmut Lang on the project "Fashion in East-Berlin" published in magazines such as Wiener and Style & the family tunes.

In 1985 Kodak commissioned Pawlok for the series "Around the World in 40 days" shown at the 1986 photokina, Cologne in a solo exhibition.

In 1988 he started working with the Polaroid 20×24-inch camera and moved to TriBeCa in New York City to work on his art projects. In the same year he invented the transfer technique using the 20×24 Polaroid Camera to start his series "Photography Paintings". With this series Werner Pawlok emphasizes his intention to dispel the traditional categorisation separating photography from painting. The concept of the shots aims to evoke the style of European classical portrait painting but without imitating or even quoting it.

In the same year Gunter Sachs became one of Pawlok's first collectors.

Also in 1988 Werner Pawlok photographed Leigh Bowery, an Australian performance artist.

Following on, in 1989, was the "Transfers" series. From Pawlok's experimental handling of processes, techniques and image carrier media emerges a pictorial style that doesn't need visual reference within reality. With "Transfers", the photographer becomes a painter. Faces and flowers are the most prevalent subjects. A large format Polaroid, which is transferred through a complex process to a heavy, rough-textured hand made paper or canvas, produces the image. The calculated exchange of the photochemical layer simultaneously combining with the amalgam of coincidence. Here, Pawlok is a painter and alchemist at the same time. Due to their so thoroughly induced metamorphoses into a new and singular pictorial space, the results of this manipulation could easily be named transmutations. Within the peculiar profundity these works radiate, the developing process seems to continue to have an effect. Their materiality reminds one of an artistic principle of modernity which doesn't make use of pictorial means solely in order to express, but elevates them to be the purpose themselves. Pawlok´s unique Polaroids became part of the Polaroid Collection.

In 1990 he began with his cycle "Stars & Paints" a series of one hundred 20×24-inch unique Polaroids of celebrities from the world of entertainment and the arts including Wim Wenders, Sir Peter Ustinov, John Malkovich, Roman Polanski, Dizzy Gillespie, Jean Paul Gaultier, Juliette Binoche and Jane Birkin. The series of portrait photographs are constructed using life-sized painted portraits with openings cut in the canvases for the sitter to insert their face and hands. The painted portraits were realised by Peter Böck under the guidance of Pawlok. These painted and collaged canvases were then taken, as part of Pawlok's mobile studio, to the sitter where the photographs were posed and taken, using appropriate props. The large format Polaroid images are signed by the celebrity sitter. The works attempt a dialogue with the nature of late 20th century celebrity and engage in a "dialogue with painting".

In May 1992 Edition Domberger, published under the patronage of King Juan Carlos of Spain, and documenta IX, the edition COLUMBUS - IN SEARCH OF A NEW TOMORROW, featured the work of 37 artists including Joseph Beuys, Max Bill, Sandro Chia, Eduardo Chillida, Christo, Roy Lichtenstein, Robert Longo, Antoni Tàpies and more. Werner Pawlok was part of the project with his Crying Monkey, portraying a monkey in a crucified position on golden leaves. In 1993 Werner Pawlok completed the series "Crying Animals" photographed with the 20×24 Polaroid camera.

Also in 1992 Mercedes-Benz commissioned Pawlok to photograph their collection of classic cars, icons of motoring including the unique Silver Arrows racing cars driven by the likes of Fangio and Moss. For this, his "Master Pieces" series, he again used the 20×24 Polaroid camera, transferring the Polaroid negative film onto canvas and thus creating an impression similar to painting.

In 1996 he started with the cycle of images named "Dantes Commedia", an interpretation of Dante Aligheri's Divina Commedia or Divine Comedy. The first time that Werner Pawlok produced a full series, of 33 pictures, using digital imaging. He does not illustrate the selected cantos, he rather conceptualises visionary image metaphors which reflect Dante's verses with a resolute gesture but still develop their own vocabulary. Dante's Inferno is cone shaped. On Pawloks transparent Cibachrome the image appears boosted, dynamic: a fervent maelstrom has seized its personnel and keeps it banished; on the other hand, the Catharsis Mountain exudes an ethereal fluidity which reminds us of the path of light which the poet walks on in his phantastic journey. Pawloks version is not trying to comment on the verses but seeks creative inspiration, an associative method that leads to precise image settings, which add themselves to an open series without joining a cohesive cycle.

In 2000 he traveled Europe to photograph the project Stars for UNICEF, portraits of European Stars such as Ewan McGregor, Patricia Kaas, Andrzej Wajda, Nacho Duato and more.

2001 Pawlok participated in the exhibition tour Images beyond the Naked Eye, together with Duane Michals, Robert Lebeck, Sarah Moon, Sebastião Salgado and others.

2002 Pawlok started his portrait cycle of "Views - Faces of Literature", a series of writers like, Martin Walser, T. C. Boyle, Henning Mankell, Amos Oz, Jonathan Franzen, Richard Ford, Salman Rushdie, Ian Rankin, Ken Follett, Armin Mueller-Stahl, Ian McEwan, Michael Ondaatje, Siri Hustvedt, Leon de Winter, Jeffrey Eugenides and more. At the Kaufleuten, probably the best-known club in Zurich, readings of contemporary writers from all over the world are a part of its program. There is limited time for Werner Pawlok and his project. It is always the same installation, a ring-flash and the camera with a Polaroid film. Always the same light too, which meets different ages, vistas and facial landscapes. Pawlok explains the procedure to Jonathan Franzen: Only two shots, pressing the release twice. One of the portraits is for the author, the other one becomes part of Pawlok's contemporary writers series. A distance of only twenty centimeters separates the author and the camera. What does the face reveal of this life? The reactions towards the portraying situation vary: from easygoing to superior, and open but also irritated by this close look that searches for the way inside. "You are not going to look into my soul", Franzen says arranging his glasses like a shield.

2004 - 2013 Cuba - expired Pawlok travels to Cuba to photograph for his series Cuba - expired. In his pictures Werner Pawlok tells about the morbid charm of an old Caribbean metropolis, showing a part of history by themselves. The splendour and misery of the Cuban utopia, the projector cubano, melt together so obviously in these abandoned palaces of the old sugar-aristocracy. Pawlok tracks this sunken world during his rambles through Havana.

2016 back to Cuba again for Harper's Bazaar Singapore and Chanel shooting Interieur with clothes and accessories for the series "Coco in Cuba.

2020 - 2021 Dimore Veneziane Originally, Pawlok only planned a series of inner spaces of the palaces. When Frederking & Thaler called him to check the readiness for a book. The book was published in 2021 by Frederking & Thaler under the title Dimore Veneziane. The authentic authors played an important role in the texts; they tell of their lives in Venice. These are Jane Da Mosto, Gianni De Luigi, Karole Vail, Saverio Pastor, Donato Riccio, Francesco Da Mosto and many more. Strong colors have already played a major role in the Cuba and New Orleans projects. Recover the faded and irritate with the now and then. For the black and white pictures, which were mostly made in the style of street photography the processing creates an irritation that gives the viewer the opportunity to mentally return to the old Venice. This comes about primarily by simulating the old glass plate photography from the late 19th century.The series of Dottore della Peste has its origins in current events. All of the photos were made during the pandemic.

2020 - 2023 Greenhouses - Cathedrals for Plants "Entering these wonderful glass palaces and being able to explore their green-scented, tropical interior with my camera felt like an expedition into the heart of the 19th century.Sometimes the plant forms, the deep shadows of the arching leaves of palm and tropical trees, led me up into the clear heightd of the glass roofs, whose constructions themselves acted like a capillary of leaf veins and translucent fibers of light." The book published by teNeues Publishing Group shows selected Greenhouses all over Europe. Benmore in Scotland, Lednice Czech Republic, Kew Gardens UK, Birmingham Botanical Gardens UK, Butterfly House Lancaster UK, Palmenhaus Wien Schönbrunn Austria, Royal Gardens Brussels Belgium, Palmengarten Frankfurt Germany, and more.

2016 - 2024 New Orleans - Undercurrent

== Exhibitions ==
- 2021: "Master Pieces", MAC2 Museum Art + Cars, Singen Germany (Solo Show)
- 2019 "Daguerreotypie, Autochrom, Polaroid", Puskin Museum of Fine Art, Moscow (Group Show)
- 2015 "Le Bord de Mondes", Palais de Tokyo, Paris
- 2014: "Blütezeit", DZ BANK Kunstsammlung, ART FOYER (Group Show)
- 2014: "glamourARTfair, Amsterdam", Leigh Bowery Photo Installation (Group Show)
- 2014: "HATS and HEADS", Gallery Tobias Hirschmann, Berlin (Group Show)
- 2013: "Sammlung Gunter Sachs", Kunsthalle Schweinfurt (Group Show)
- 2013: "Views - faces of literature", Artweek Hamburg, Hamburg (Solo Show)
- 2013: "Otherness. I is somebody else", Portraits Leigh Bowery by Werner Pawlok, Espace Culturel Louis Vuitton, Paris (Group Show)
- 2013: "Im Zeichen der Feder", Gallery Tobias Hirschmann, Berlin (Group Show)
- 2013: "Metro - Pole", Gallery AEA, Berlin (Solo Show)
- 2012: "Xtravaganza - Staging Leigh Bowery", Kunsthalle Vienna, Museumsquartier halle 1, Austria (Group Show)
- 2012: "Views - faces of literature", Literaturhaus, Stuttgart (Solo Show)
- 2012: "Werner Pawlok - Fotografien", Kunsthalle Messmer, Riegel (Solo Show)
- 2012: "Polaroid", The Finnish Museum of Photography, Helsinki (Group Show)
- 2012: "Polaroid (Im)possible - the Westlicht Collection", Westlicht, Wien, Austria (Group Show)
- 2009: "Cuba Expired", Oliver Gordon Gallery, Toronto, Kanada (Solo Show)
- 1999: "Augenlust - erotische Kunst im 20. Jahrhundert", Kunsthaus Hannover, Hannover (Group Show)
- 1997: "Dantes Commedia", Gallery Benden & Klimczak, Köln (Solo Show)
- 1996: "Transfers", Gallery Raab Boukamel, London (Solo Show)
- 1994: "Crying Animals", Gallery Hans Mayer, Düsseldorf (Solo Show)
- 1992: "Photography Paintings", Kunstverein Siegen (Solo Show) "Photography Paintings", Brandenburgische Kunstsammlung, Cottbus (Solo Show)
- 1991: "Colour", Hamilton´s Gallery, London (Group Show)
- 1991: "Photography Paintings", Fotografie Forum International, Frankfurt am Main (Solo Show)

== Publications ==
- Werner Pawlok - New Orleans - Undercurrent, 2024, teNeues Publishing Group ISBN 978-3-96171-5701
- Werner Pawlok - Greenhouses - Cathedrals for Plants, 2023, teNeues Publishing Group ISBN 978-3-96171-4575
- Werner Pawlok - Dimore Veneziane, 2021, Frederking & Thaler Verlag GmbH ISBN 978-395416-3441
- Werner Pawlok - cuba - expired, Frederking & Thaler Verlag Gmbh ISBN 978-3954162222
- Werner Pawlok - made in Cuba, Avenso ISBN 978-3-935971-71-3
- FROM POLAROID TO IMPOSSIBLE - the Westlicht Collection, Hatje Cantz ISBN 978-3-7757-2650-4
- Leigh Bowery, Violette Edition, London ISBN 978-1-900828-04-8
- PHOTOGRAPHY IN THE FAST LANE, Mercedes Benz through the lens of famous Photographers, 2011
- AUGENLUST, Erotische Kunst im 20. Jahrhundert, Kunsthaus Hannover, ISBN 3-924747-87-3
- Emerging bodies/Akt in Polaroid, Edition Stemmle, 2000 ISBN 3-908163-32-3
- Master Pieces, Fotobuch, Edition Cantz, 1992 ISBN 3-89-322-491-2
- Stars & Paints. Braus. 1997. ISBN 3-89466-182-8
- Photography Paintings, Edition Stemmle, ISBN 3-7231-0014-7
- Transfers, Fotobuch, Edition Cantz, 1992 ISBN 3-89322-515-3
- Das Goldene Zeitalter, Edition Cantz, 1991
- Die Bildermacher, 1991 ISBN 3-89309-032-0
- Selections 3, Polaroid Collections, 1986
