= Nitron =

Nitron can refer to:

- The original Greek form of the word nitre, whence nitrogen
- A finish applied to certain firearms; see ferritic nitrocarburizing
- The ring name of Canadian actor and former professional wrestler Daryl Karolat, who is better known by the stage name Tyler Mane
- A fictional element that was being extracted from the Earth's atmosphere in Flash Gordon's Trip to Mars (1938)
- A fictional element mentioned in the novel Chapterhouse: Dune (1985) by Frank Herbert
- The humanoid warrior from the series Tattooed Teenage Alien Fighters from Beverly Hills
- A chemical compound [de] with formula C_{20}H_{16}N_{4}
