= Prisoners of Love (1954 film) =

1954 film directed by Rudolf Jugert

- Directed by: Rudolf Jugert
- Written by: Walter Forster
- Starring: Curd Jürgens; Annemarie Düringer; Bernhard Wicki
- Cinematography: Herbert Geier; Bruno Mondi
- Edited by: Walter Boos
- Music by: Werner Eisbrenner
- Production companies: Rhombus Film; Süd-Film
- Distributed by: Herzog Film; Sascha Film (Austria)
- Release date: 29 July 1954
- Running time: 100 minutes
- Country: West Germany
- Language: German

Prisoners of Love (German: Gefangene der Liebe) is a 1954 West German drama film directed by Rudolf Jugert and starring Curd Jürgens, Annemarie Düringer and Bernhard Wicki. It revolves around the story of a married couple separated by the Second World War. It was shot at the Bavaria Studios in Munich. The film's sets were designed by the art director Erich Kettelhut and Johannes Ott.

== Synopsis ==
During the closing stage of the Second World War Willi Kluge and Maria got married, but only got to spend a few hours together before they were separated by wartime events. Maria finally returns home having spent eight years in Soviet captivity. She also brings a small child she had conceived during the difficult time of her imprisonment. Her husband is devastated by this betrayal and files for divorce. Ultimately he is able to overcome this reaction, and the couple reconcile.

== Cast ==
- Curd Jürgens as Willi Kluge
- Annemarie Düringer as Maria, seine Frau
- Bernhard Wicki as Franz Martens
- Mady Rahl as Anni
- Paul Esser as Max
- Brigitte Horney as Dr. Hildegard Thomas
- Claire Reigbert as Ihre Mutter
- Gabriele Strasser as Christine, das Kind
- Fritz Benscher as Ludwig
- Til Kiwe as Heinz
- Ingeborg Thiede as Rita
- Herbert Kroll as Karl
- Ruth von Zerboni as Hanne, seine Frau
- Jürgen Micksch as Richard, 10jähriger Sohn
- Agnes Fink as Paula Scheftschick
- Heinz-Leo Fischer as Ansager der Todesbahn
- Alfons Teuber as Ansager der orientalischen Nächte
- Franz Fröhlich as Ansager am Lukas

== Bibliography ==
- Robert G. Moeller. War Stories: The Search for a Usable Past in the Federal Republic of Germany. University of California Press, 2001.
