= Roberta Brown (swordmaster) =

American swordmaster and actress

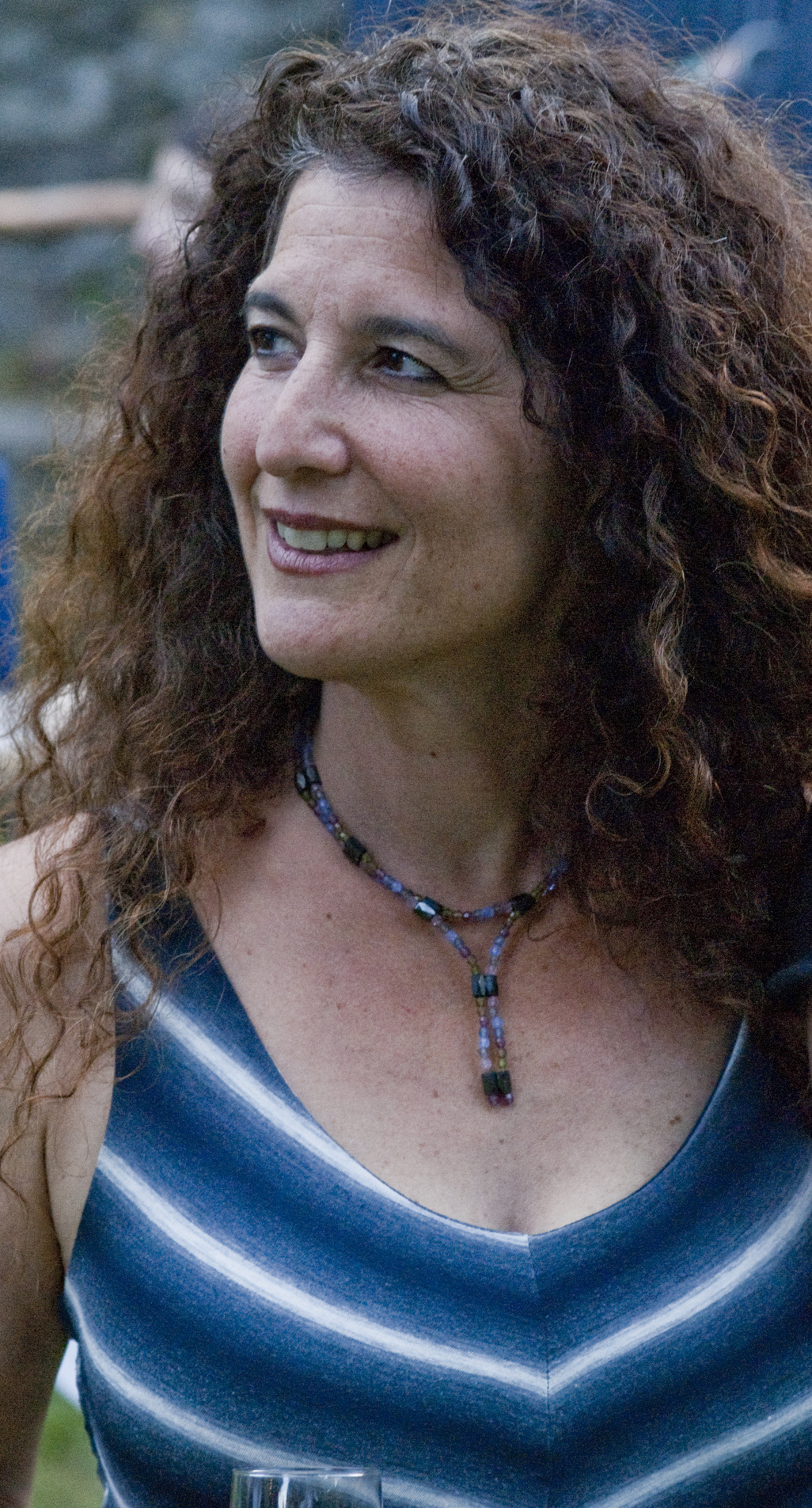
- Roberta Brown at Shakespeare in Styria in Murau (Austria), 2014
- Born: Roberta Ellen Brown; April 2, 1965 (age 61); Warwick, Rhode Island, U.S.
- Education: Brandeis University; Webber Douglas Academy of Dramatic Art
- Occupations: Actress; Swordmaster
- Website: www.robertabrown.com

Roberta Brown is an American swordmaster and actress.

She is known for her work on Queen of Swords where she worked as a sword coach and onscreen as a sword double for female characters played by Tessie Santiago, Bo Derek, and Paulina Galvez. She has choreographed numerous fights and sword fights for other television series, theatre, and motion pictures.

== Career ==
Brown took up fencing at college and continued her studies as an actress and stage combatant at the Webber Douglas Academy of Dramatic Art (London), where she received a Master of Fine Arts equivalency. She became one of a limited number of female swordmasters who worked in theatre, film and television. She acted as fencing double for Lucy Liu in the film Charlie's Angels, and choreographed a scene in a TV episode of ER between Noah Wyle and Goran Visnjic. She worked on the syndicated TV series Queen of Swords and as fight director on the TV film Boudica with Alex Kingston.

She was a theatre student at Brandeis University where she was introduced to fencing, and has been acclaimed as an outstanding alumna. She has practiced her craft for over ten years.

She was brought onto the TV series Queen of Swords by the initial swordmaster and stunt co-ordinator Anthony De Longis to train Tessie Santiago's stunt double Natalia Guijarro. She also doubled Bo Derek in master shots and Paulina Gálvez wagon scene in the episode "The Witness". She has been a stunt double on Masterpiece Theatre programs.

Brown has choreographed for television series, theatre, and motion pictures. Among the actors she has trained, coached, and occasionally fenced onscreen are Billy Campbell, Tessie Santiago, Peter Wingfield, Andrew Helm, Valentine Pelka, Anthony Lemke, Patricia Arquette, Lucy Liu, Elizabeth Gracen, Bob Golec, Patrick Fabian, Noah Wyle, Goran Visnjic, Mary Reinhardt, and Alex Kingston. Though never having trained him, she fenced with actor/swordmaster Anthony De Longis onscreen.

She has taught swordplay and theatrical combat in among other locations Howard Fine Acting Studio and The Lee Strasburg Institute (both Hollywood); Juan Angel Theatre and Teatro Libre (both Bogotá, Colombia); Graz Kendo Club (Austria); Teatro Lope de Vega (Spain); Webber Douglas Academy of Dramatic Art (London); Inosanto Academy, College of the Canyons, University of Southern California, and West Los Angeles College (all California). She is a recognized expert in many forms of martial arts, including short swords and whip work. At the Beverly Hills Fencers' Club, Brown is Director of Theatrical Combat.

The Los Angeles Times wrote of Brown: "She's dead serious about the importance of proper training and safety procedures."

Variety wrote that "Roberta Brown's fight choreography heightens the brutal confrontations." Backstage West calls her oeuvre "disturbing and convincing." The Fight Master opined: "It is her solid experience, talent, and smarts that allow her to thrive in an otherwise male-dominated field."

== Published works ==
- Evangelista, Nick; Evangelista, Anita; Brown, Roberta (afterword) (September 1, 2001). The Woman Fencer (paperback) (1st ed.). Terre Haute, Indiana: Wish Publishing. ISBN 1930546483.; ISBN 978-1930546486

== Credits ==
=== Multimedia ===
- Women of Action Network (Action Consultant)
- Mary Read (Swordmaster)

=== Film and television ===
==== Fight direction/stunts ====
- Lapse (2009/I) (fight director)
- A Gothic Romance (2004) (fight director)
- Boudica/Warrior Queen (2003) Masterpiece Theatre (stunt double: Alex Kingston)*Boudica (2003) (fight director) (sword master)
- Holes (2003) (bullwhip trainer)
- The Bacchae (2002) (whip choreographer)
- Charlie's Angels (2000) (fencing choreographer)
- Charlie's Angels (2000) (fencing double: Lucy Liu) (uncredited)
- The District (2000) TV series (knife sword double/stunts)
- Queen of Swords (2000) TV series (stunt double: Bo Derek / Paulina Galvez / Tessie Santiago) (stunts: swords)
- The X Show (1999) TV series (fencing consultant) (unknown episodes)
- A Walk in the Park (1999) (fight director)
- Prince Valiant (1997) (swordplay coach)
- Fist of the North(1995) (stunts) (uncredited)
- Dragon Fury (1995) (stunts)
- ER (1994) TV series (sword master) (unknown episodes)
- Treasure Island: The Adventure Begins (1994) (TV) (dialect coach)

==== Actress ====
- A Gothic Romance (2004) .... Maria
- The Hunted .... Raquel
- Deadlock (1997) .... Magil
- Dragon Fury (1995) .... Warrior
- Tonya & Nancy: The Inside Story (1994) (TV) (uncredited) .... Medic

==== As herself ====
- The Story of the Costume Drama .... Herself, Episode: "A Call to Arms" (2008)
- The X Show .... Herself, Episode: "18 October 1999" (1999)
- Home & Family .... Herself, Episode: "14 November 1996" (1996)

=== Theater swordmaster ===
Shakespeare in Styria
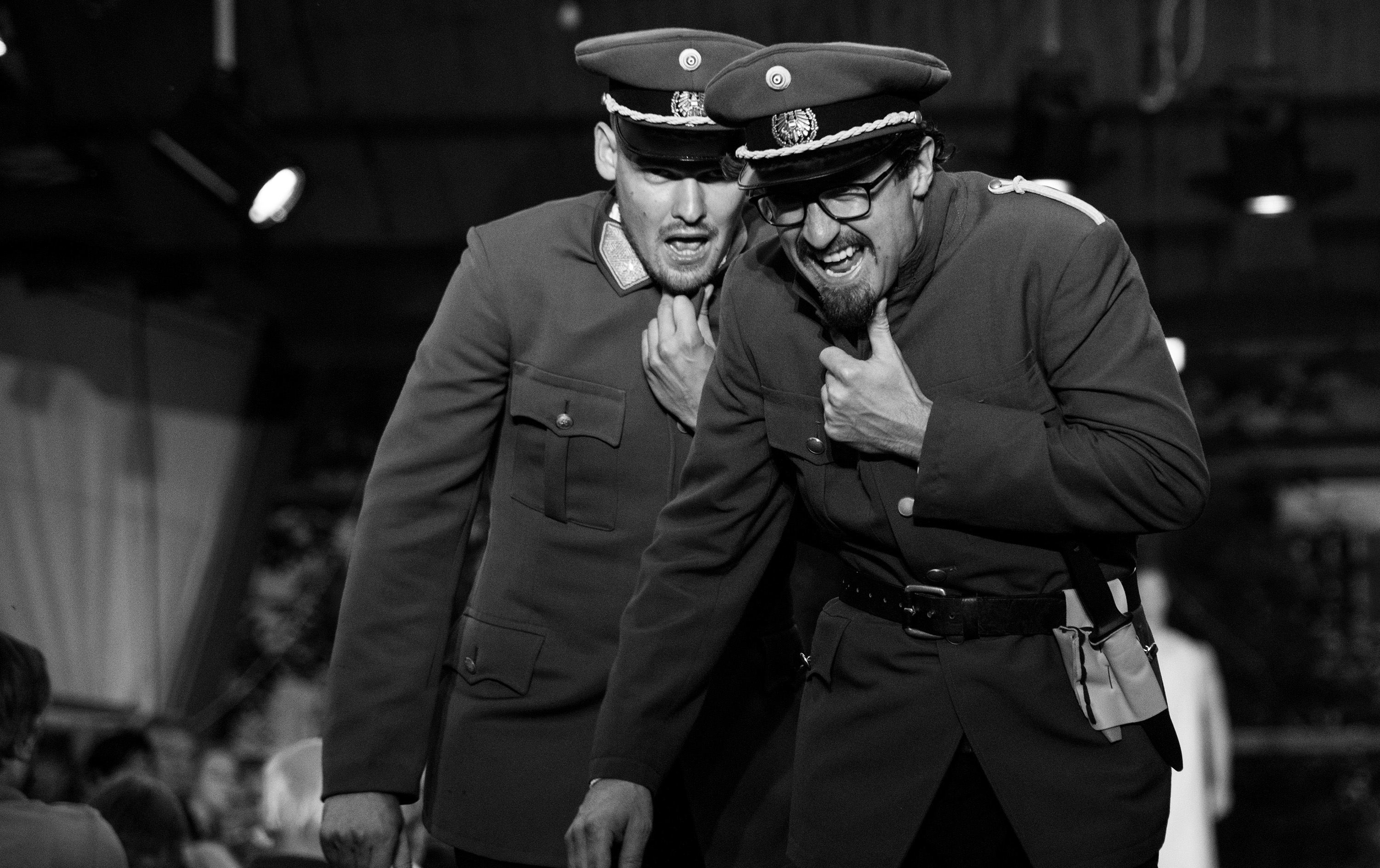
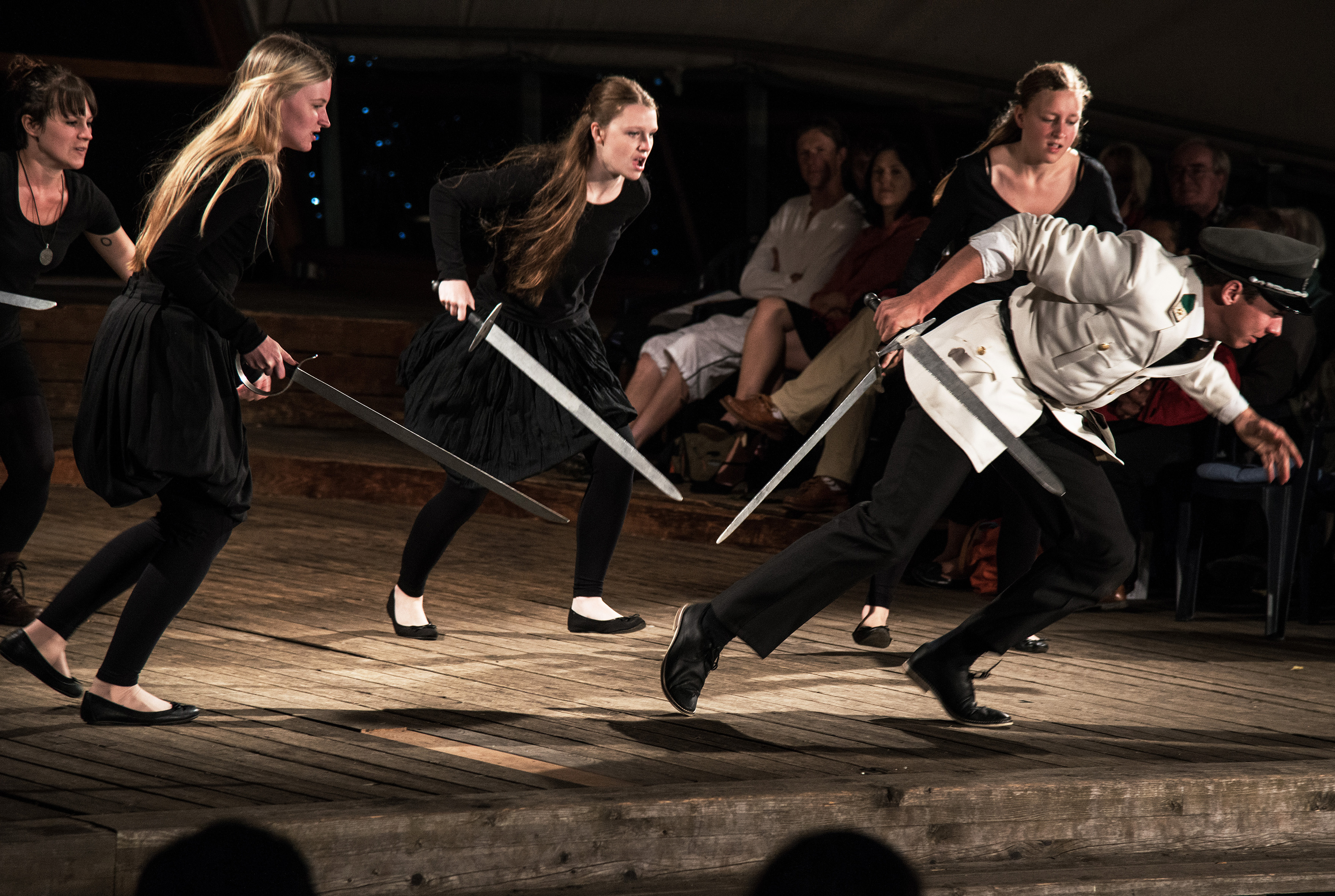
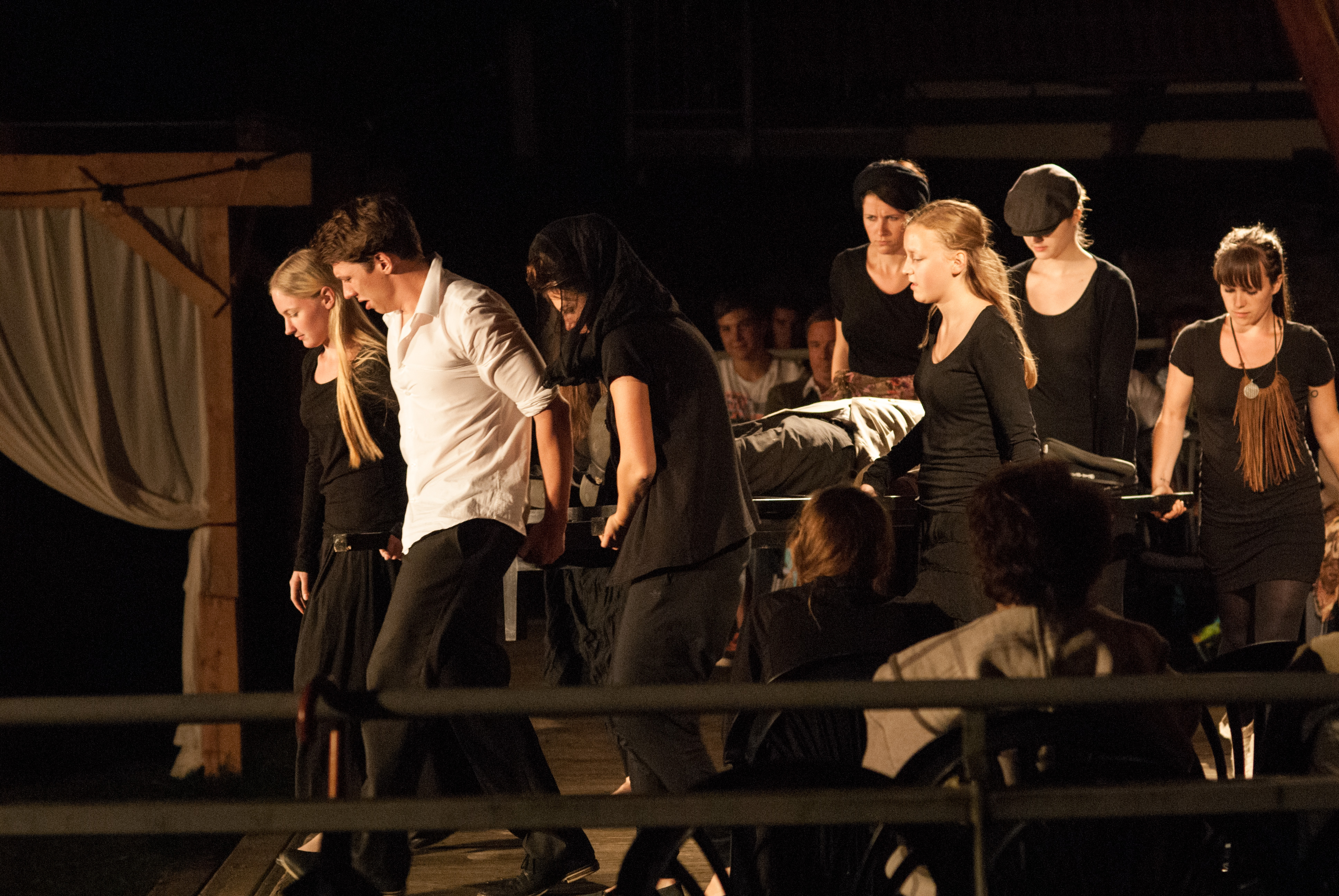
Julius Caesar, directed by Nicholas Allen and Roberta Brown, Murau 2014
- "Julius Cäsar in Murau".................Shakespeare in Styria, Austria
- "Romeo and Juliet......................Open House Vienna Theatre (Schlosspark Pötzleinsdorf), Vienna Austria
- "Macbeth"..................Shakespeare's Globe Theatre, London UK
- "Oman ... O Man!"..............Kennedy Center, Washington DC
- "Hamlet".......................European Shakespeare Days, Austria
- "Twelfth Night"................Globe Theater (Los Angeles)
- "Romeo and Juliet".............European Shakespeare Days, Austria Days
- "Names"........................Lee Strasberg Theatre
- "The Ugly Play"................Santa Monica Playhouse
- "Hamlet".......................Playhouse West
- "Ravish".......................New Dance Theatre
- "15-Minute Hamlet".............Shakespeare and Friends
- "Maria Morevna"................Ziggurat Theatre Ensemble
- "Fortinbras"...................Howard Fine Theater
- "Romeo and Juliet".............Shakespeare and Friends
- "Twelfth Night"................Gascon Center Theatre
- "Hasta La Muerte"..............Gascon Center Theatre
- "Improvimagic".................Hollywood's Magic Castle
- "Horatio Hornblower"...........Long Beach Pier
- "Richard the Lionheart"........Vienna's English Theatre, Austria
- "Briar Patch"..................Ventura Court Theater
- "The Erpingham Camp"...........The Drayton Arms, London

== See also ==
- Helene Mayer
- Douglas Fairbanks
