= Jean Charles (film) =

2009 film directed by Henrique Goldman

- Directed by: Henrique Goldman
- Written by: Henrique Goldman; Marcelo Starobinas
- Produced by: Henrique Goldman; Luke Schiller; Carlos Nader; Stephen Frears (Executive); Rebecca O'Brien (Executive)
- Starring: Selton Mello; Vanessa Giácomo
- Cinematography: Guillermo Escalon
- Edited by: Kerry Kohler
- Music by: Nitin Sawhney
- Production companies: UK Film Council; Mango Films
- Distributed by: Imagem Filmes (Brazil)
- Release date: 26 June 2009 (Brazil)
- Running time: 93 minutes
- Countries: United Kingdom; Brazil
- Languages: English; Portuguese

Jean Charles is a 2009 British-Brazilian feature film depicting the true story of Jean Charles de Menezes, a Brazilian electrician wrongly shot dead by the Metropolitan Police at Stockwell tube station in London on 22 July 2005, after being mistaken for a suicide bomber.

The film was directed by Henrique Goldman and received its international premiere at the 2009 Toronto International Film Festival. Selton Mello stars as Jean Charles with many of the other roles played by the actual friends and family of Jean Charles de Menezes. Award-winning director Stephen Frears was an executive producer for the film.

== Cast ==
- Selton Mello as Jean Charles
- Vanessa Giácomo as Vivian
- Marek Oravec as Iatzek
- Luís Miranda as Alex
- Patricia Armani as Patricia
- Maurício Varlotta as Maurício
- Sidney Magal as himself
- Daniel de Oliveira as Marcelo
- Marcelo Soares as Chuliquinha
- Rogério Dionísio as Bisley
- Julian Harries as English Man
- Denise Stephenson as Female Police Liaison Officer
- Christopher Pencakowski as Male Police Liaison Officer

== Reception ==
Allan Hunter praised Mello's performance.

== See also ==
- Suspect: The Shooting of Jean Charles de Menezes
