= The Hunted (2015 film) =

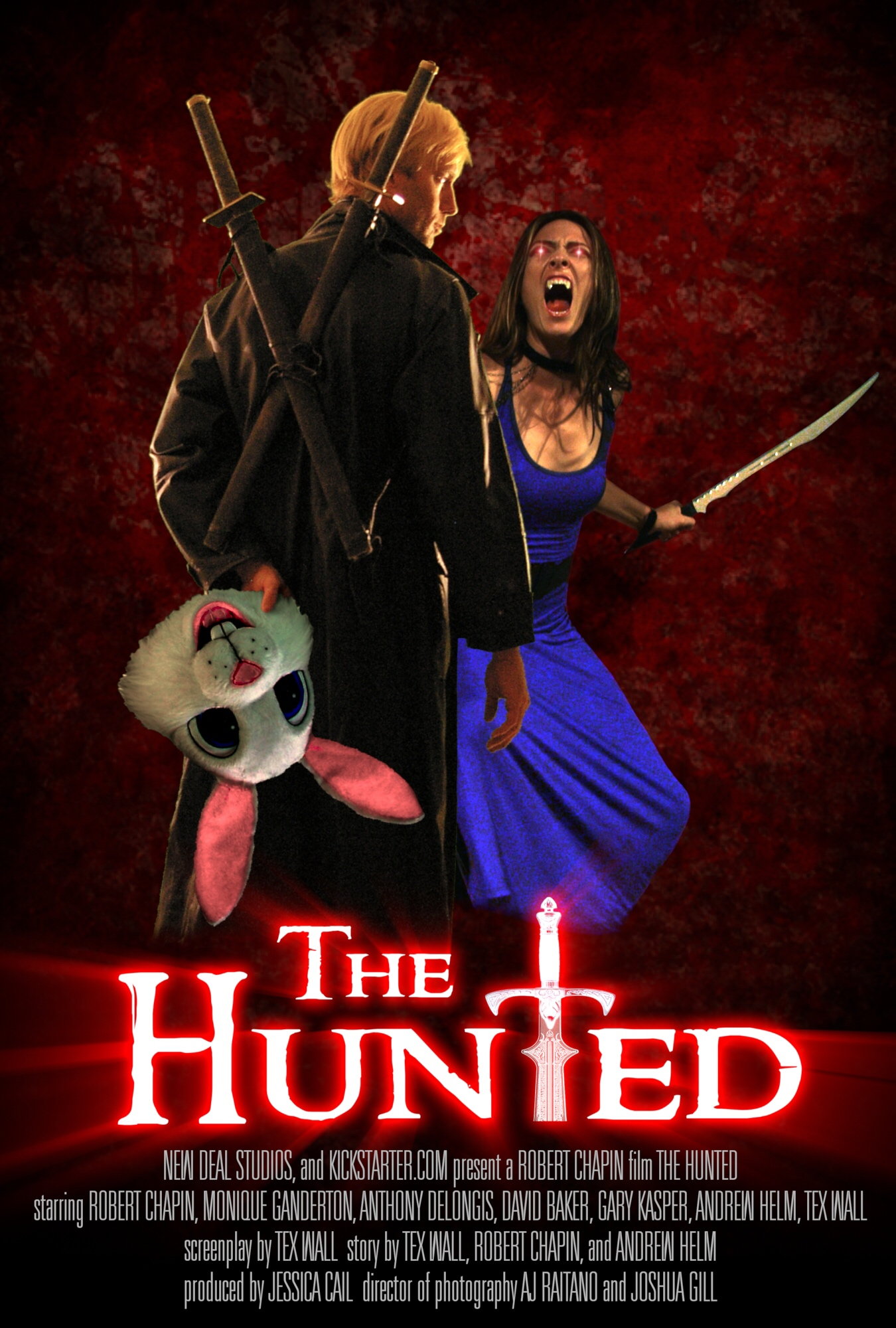
- Official Movie Poster
- Directed by: Robert Chapin
- Written by: Robert Chapin
- Produced by: Sandra Baxter; Richard Bennett; Jessica Cail; Christopher David Gauntt; Kerry Glover; Gillian Horvath; Jeffrey Jasper; Liz McLelland; Jochen Repolust; Mark-Paul Speechley; Victoria Speechley
- Starring: Robert Chapin; Monique Ganderton; David Lain Baker; Gary Kasper; Tex Wall; Andrew Helm
- Cinematography: Josh Gill, A.J. Raitano
- Release date: May 9, 2015
- Running time: 90 minutes
- Country: United States
- Language: English

The Hunted is a 2015 American film created and directed by Robert Chapin based on the action comedy web series, The Hunted (2001). Starring Chapin and Monique Ganderton, it tells the story of a struggling actor who leads a group of misfit vampire slayers against an army of vampires. The film was distributed online through Vimeo VOD.

== Plot ==
In Los Angeles, unsuccessful actor Bob (Chapin) is bitten by a vampire, Susan (Ganderton), who is the daughter of a crazed vigilante slayer. Consequently, Bob becomes one of the "hunted", a small group of humans who have been bitten by vampires but have not turned into vampires. They use cold steel and fighting techniques to fend off vampires. The vampires, however, have developed an immunity to most killing methods and can only be killed with swords. Luckily, Bob is a skilled swordsman due to his former role in the action film Vampslayer. Bob helps Susan and the hunted defend themselves against the vampires.

== Cast ==
- Robert Chapin as Bob
- Monique Ganderton as Susan
- David Lain Baker as Harry
- Gary Kasper as Dragos
- Tex Wall as Lore Master
- Andrew Helm as Kevin
- Anthony De Longis as Vincent

== Production ==
=== Conception and writing ===
The Hunted (web series) began in 2001 as a long-running internet series, created by Robert Chapin. Chapin started this series in an effort to improve his profile as a stuntman and VFX artist. He collaborated with friends and colleagues in creating the series. The series garnered an active fanbase who contributed to the series by creating user-generated content, which became the main source of content for the online series.

The Hunted is known for often weaving lines from popular culture and literature into its dialogue. This includes reuse of lines from films such as Scarface (1983), Independence Day (1996) and Shakespearean poems.

=== Filming ===
The film received financial support in June 2011 via a Kickstarter campaign. The film was shot in Hollywood, California in 2012 and is co-produced by New Deal Studios. Post-production was completed in March 2015. The majority of the film's cast consisted of stunt performers.
