= Shakespeare in Styria =

Austrian Shakespeare festival

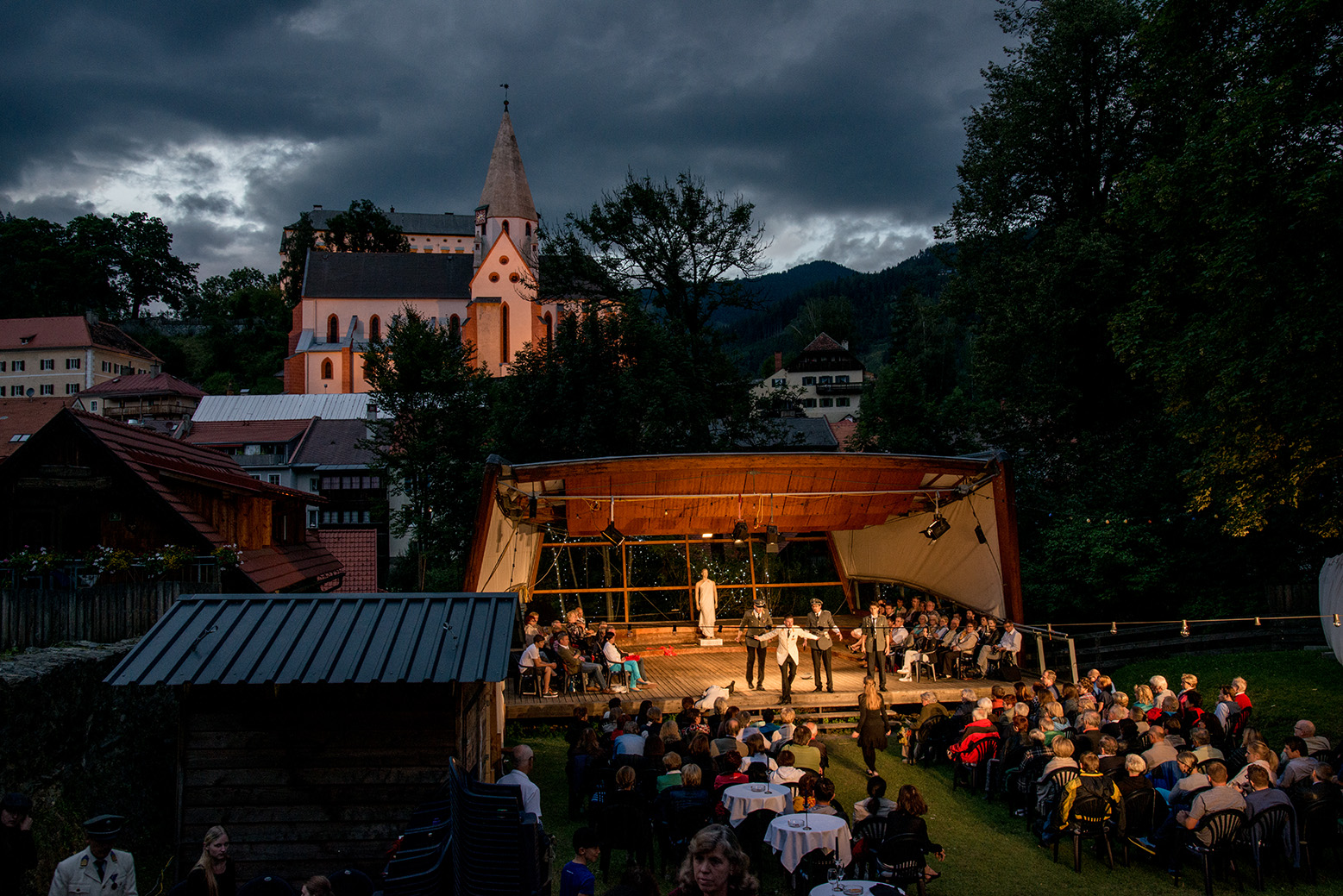
Julius Caesar by William Shakespeare performed in Murau, 2014

Shakespeare in Styria was an annual Shakespeare festival in the Upper Styrian town of Murau in Austria. The festival was founded in 2002 by British-born theatre manager Nicholas Allen and Austrian writer Rudolph J. Wojta.

Since September 2015, the festival (re-branded as "Shakespeare im Park") is being managed by Paul Elsbacher (Executive Director) und Eric Lomas (Artistic Director). The 2016 summer show was an acclaimed production of The Comedy of Errors, performed at Saint Lambert's Abbey, followed by a series of performances in the gardens of Palais Pötzleinsdorf in Vienna. No further performances are planned for Murau.

== History ==
Each summer, Shakespeare in Styria staged an open-air Shakespeare production in the Styrian Alps, together with concerts, lectures and readings. From modest beginnings as a teacher student-training program, the project developed into a small annual festival with professional actors from all over Europe. Until 2011 performances were in English, since 2013 in German. In 2007 British director Daniel Winder took over as artistic director from Nicholas Allen. In 2011 he handed this position on to British theatre director Sean Aita. Since 2013 productions have been directed by Nicholas Allen and US-American sword-master Roberta Brown. In the early years, sets were designed by Rudolph J. Wojta. Maria Krebs served as costume designer and maker from 2002 -2006.

Several well-known actors have appeared as actor-in-residence sharing their artistry with the young performers. The festival also serves as springboard for young aspiring actors; for example, the 2009 production of Macbeth formed the basis for the 2012 film production The Tragedy of Macbeth using the same principal actors as the Murau production - Marek Oravec and Hannah Taylor-Gordon - and eventually winning awards for Best Film, Best Actor, and Best Director at the Indie Film Festival. In 2010 and in 2011 English actor Ben Crystal and Irish actor Damien Molony performed at the Austrian festival.

During the first four years performances took place in the town's Festival Hall. In 2006, Shakespeare in Styria moved to the courtyard and barn of Murau Castle owned by the House of Schwarzenberg. Head of the family is Karel Schwarzenberg, former Czech foreign minister. His wife, Princess Therese Schwarzenberg née Hardegg, was Festival President until 2013. Well known Burgtheater actress Annemarie Düringer was patron from 2004 until her death in 2014. She also gave readings during the festival.

In 2013, the festival was relaunched at a new site, the Günther Domenig pavilion in midst the city park, now performing in German and therefore appealing to a broader audience. The festival moved to its current home at St. Lamrecht Abbey, some 14 km from Murau, in the summer of 2016.

== Plays ==
Julius Caesar
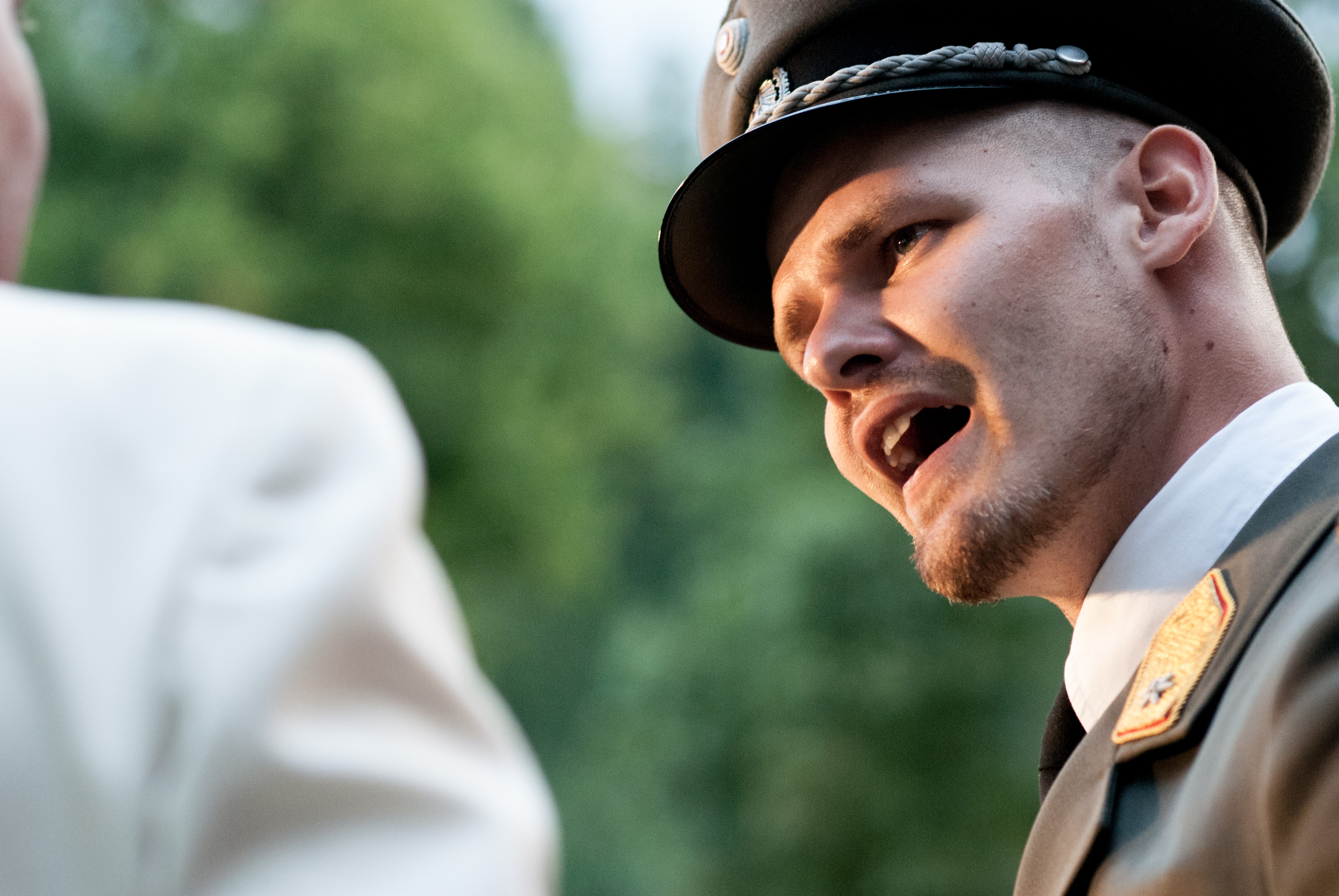
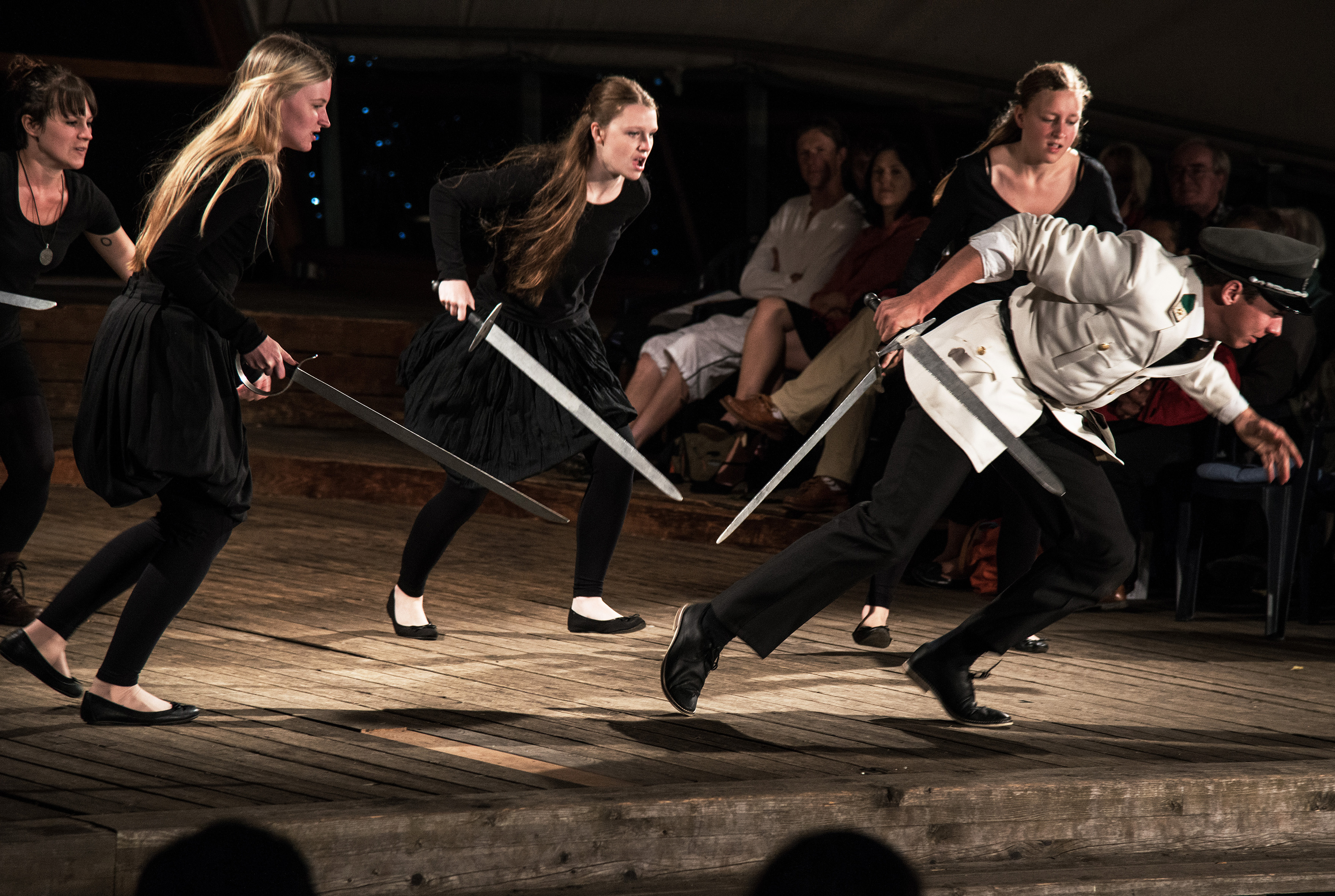
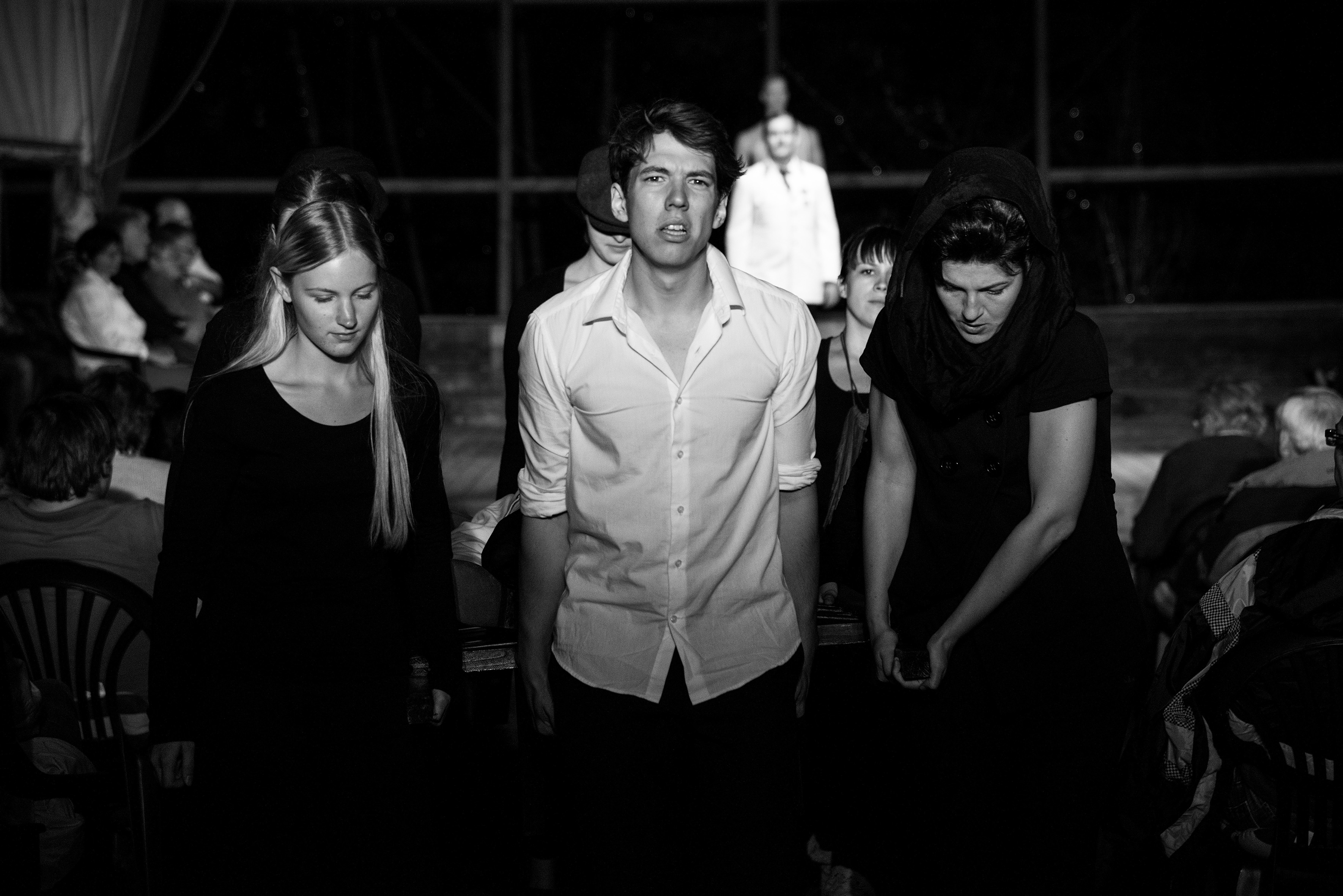
Shakespeare in Styria 2014, directed by Nicholas Allen and Roberta Brown
- 2002: A Midsummer Night's Dream
- 2003: Twelfth Night
- 2004: The Taming of the Shrew
- 2005: The Merry Wives of Windsor
- 2006: The Tempest
- 2007: Romeo and Juliet
- 2008: Hamlet
- 2009: Macbeth
- 2010: King Lear, A Midsummer Night's Dream
- 2011: Twelfth Night
- 2012: -
- 2013: Othello
- 2014: Julius Cäsar
- 2015: Antonius und Cleopatra
- 2016: Die Komödie der Irrungen
- 2017: Der Widerspenstigen Zähmung
- 2018: Viel Lärm um Nichts
- 2019: Macbeth
