= Robert Chapin =

American actor (born 1964)

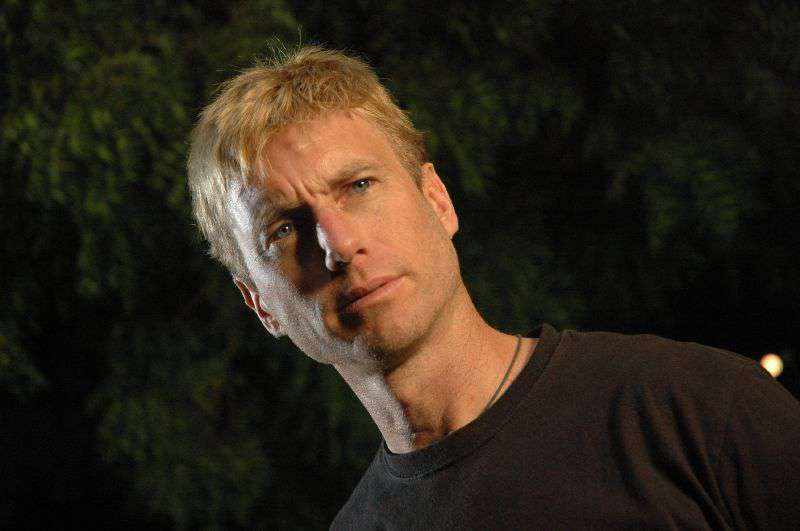
- Chapin in 2008
- Born: Robert Chapin; April 3, 1964 (age 62); Miami, Florida, United States
- Education: University of Central Florida
- Occupations: Fight Choreographer, Actor, Writer, Director, Producer
- Height: 6 ft 4 in (193 cm)
- Website: www.robertchapin.com

Robert Chapin (born April 3, 1964, in Miami, Florida) is a stunt, fight and swordplay choreographer, visual effects artist and supervisor, actor, writer, director, and producer. He is popularly known for acting in and creating the longest running action horror web series called The Hunted. He is also known for creating visual effects for American Beauty, Crouching Tiger, The Big Lebowski and X-Men. Chapin first starred in a film called Ring of Steel, of which he also wrote. As a fight choreographer and instructor, he is certified with the Societies of American, British, and Canadian Fight Directors. He has trained with stars such as Plácido Domingo, Robin Williams, David Hasselhoff, John Saxon, Marc Singer, Richard Grieco, Richard Lynch, Mike Norris, James Lew, Olivier Gruner, Jeff Conaway, Raye Hollitt, Tessie Santiago, and Angelica Bridges.

== Early life, background and career ==
Robert Chapin was born on April 3, 1964, in Miami, Florida, to a family of puppeteers, Leonora and Gerald Chapin. Chapin grew up making movies with brother, Stuart Chapin. Throughout his junior high and high school years, he attended drama and musical classes. In 1982, he received a music scholarship in Miami Dade Community College where he also took a course in Computer Science. At that same time, he also began training in stage combat and swordplay with a group that performed living chessgames called The Royal Chessmen at local fairs. Later on, he joined a jousting troupe called The Knights Arrant, and a small troupe called Ring of Steel, which performed sword fights at local theme park called Pirates. It was in this time that he met Matthew Gratzner, and Shannon Gans who created New Deal Studios in Los Angeles.

In 1985, he moved to Orlando, Florida. There, Chapin worked his way through college at the University of Central Florida by performing sword fights at a local dinner theater known as Shakespeare's Taevern. In 1986, Chapin's father died, but he continued his college until he graduated in 1987. Also at this time, he continued to take drama classes and choreographed sword fights for Romeo and Juliet.

Convinced by his brother, Chapin moved to Los Angeles where he worked as a swordsman on feature films such as Hook and Army of Darkness. In 1991, Chapin's mother died, two years before Bob wrote and starred in his first film, Ring of Steel, which was distributed by MCA Universal. Over the years, Chapin went on to star in several action films while building his credentials as an actor, stuntman, and fight coordinator. Also in this time, he began a career as a visual effects artist, using his skills and knowledge in computer science. He started with Pacific Data Images in Los Angeles, and then moved from one company to another. Chapin also worked with critically and widely acclaimed award-winning films such as X-Men, Fantastic Four, Armageddon, and American Beauty. He also headed several indie films before he became an in-house visual effects supervisor at New Deal Studios.

Chapin continuously kept up his acting and sword fighting skills. He trained for years with the infamous acting coach, Larry Moss, and was certified in six weapons as an actor-combatant in 1995 with the Societies of American, British, and Canadian Fight Directors at the First International Stage Combat Workshop in London, England.

In 2001, he co-created The Hunted with writer/actor Andrew Helm. The Hunted is one of the longest running web shows online.

== Filmography ==
The following are the films and TV series or shows participated by Chapin as a visual effects artist or animator, actor, director, producer, and stunt and swordplay choreographer:

Visual Effects Artist / Animator (Film)
Year	Project	Notes
2012	Saving Santa	Post-production; Visual effects supervisor
2012	The Grey	Visual effects artist
2010	Shutter Island	Digital effects supervisor: New Deal Studios
2009	Night at the Museum: Battle of the Smithsonian	Digital effects supervisor in New Deal Studios (Uncredited)
2009	Watchmen	Previs artist (Uncredited)
2008	100 Feet	Digital supervisor
2008	Iron Man	Previs artist (Uncredited)
2008	Paraiso Travel	Visual effects supervisor
2008	Cloverfield	Visual effects (Uncredited)
2007	The Red Chalk	Digital artist
2007	Fantastic 4: Rise of the Silver Surfer	Visual effects in Hammerhead Productions
2006	Night at the Museum	Visual effects (uncredited)
2006	The Fast and the Furious: Tokyo Drift	Effects animator in Hammerhead Productions
2006	X-Men: The Last Stand	Visual effects
2005	Fantastic Four	Visual effects
2004	The Chronicles of Riddick	Visual effects
2004	Miss Castaway and the Island Girls	Visual effects supervisor
2003	X2	Visual effects
2002	Queen of the Damned	Visual effects
2002	The Bacchae	Visual effects supervisor
2001	The Animal	Visual effects
2000	Almost Famous	3D artist
2000	Crouching Tiger, Hidden Dragon	Digital artist
2000	The Convent	Visual effects supervisor
1999	American Beauty	3D artist
1999	Muppets from Space	Visual effects
1998	Mighty Joe Young	Visual effects
1998	Pleasantville	Visual effects (Uncredited)
1998	Armageddon	CG animator; Credited as Dr. Bob Chapin
1998	Six Days Seven Nights	Visual effects (Uncredited)
1998	The Big Lebowski	3D Digital artist
1997	The Devil's Advocate	Computer animator
1997	Trojan War	Visual effects (Uncredited)
1997	Con Air	Computer graphics effects
1997	Dante's Peak	Visual effects supervisor
1997	Lancelot: Guardian of Time	Visual effects supervisor
1997	Deadlock	Visual effects
1996	My Fellow Americans	Visual effects
1996	Extreme Measures	Visual effects (Uncredited)
1996	Alaska	Visual effects
1996	Matilda	Visual effects (Uncredited)
1996	The Nutty Professor	Special visual effects
1996	Before and After	Visual effects
1996	White Squall	Visual effects
1995	Steal Big Steal Little	Visual effects
1993	RoboCop 3	Production Support
1992	The Babe	Film recordist and assistant Animator
Visual Effects Artist / Animator (TV/Web)
Year	Project	Notes
2010	The Hunted	2 episodes - Visual effects
2008	Terminator: The Sarah Connor Chronicles	Pilot episode - Visual effects
2007	Chuck	Chuck Versus the Crown Vic episode - Visual effects
2007	Criminal Minds	Visual effects - Identity episode
2006	There & Back: Ashley Parker Angel	Visual effects supervisor - 10 episodes
2005	Invasion	Pilot episode - Visual effects
2005	CSI: Crime Scene Investigation	4x4 Episode - Visual effects
2000	The Privateers	TV movie; Visual effects
1998	The Tempest	TV movie; Visual effects

Stunts (Film/TV/Web)
Year	Project	Notes
2011	Hirokin	Stunts
2011	Legends of Atoll	Stunt coordinator
2008	Nenu Meeku Telusa?	Assistant stunt coordinator
2006	Tenacious D in The Pick of Destiny	Stunts
2006	Kill Your Darlings	Stunts
2005	Soldier of God	Sword fight choreographer
2004	Next Action Star	Utility stunts
2002	Scooby-Doo	Stunt double (Uncredited)
1999	The Magnificent Seven	Stunts
1998	Sinbad: The Battle of the Dark Knights	Fight coordinator
1997	Lancelot: Guardian of Time	Fight coordinator
1996	Beetleborgs: Vampire Files	Stunts
1996	Kindred: The Embraced	Stunts
1996	Baywatch	Stunt double
1996	Dragon Fury II	Fight coordinator
1996	The Dark Mist	Stunts
1995	Dragon Fury	Fight coordinator
1995	Enter the Blood Ring	Stunts
1994 - 1995	Tattooed Teenage Alien Fighters from Beverly Hills	Stunt coordinator; Stunt double
1994	Renaissance Man	Stunts
1994	2002: The Rape of Eden	Stunts; As Bob Chapin
1994	Eyes of the Serpent	Stunts
1993	Robin Hood: Men in Tights	Stunts
1992	Ring of the Musketeers	TV movie; Stunt player
1992	Army of Darkness	Stunts (Uncredited)
1991	Hook	Stunts (Uncredited)
Actor (TV/Film/Web)
Year	Project	Role
2011	Legends of Atoll	thug
2008	Faux Baby	Elliot
2008	Pirate's Blood	Andrew Selkirk
2002	The Bacchae	Battalion leader
2001 - 2011	The Hunted	Dr. Bob / Mikey
2000	The Privateers	Captain Antilles
1999	The Magnificent Seven	Martin, Cowboy with Whip
1998	Sabrina, the Teenage Witch	King Arthur
1998	Sinbad: The Battle of the Dark Knights	Kether
1997	Lancelot: Guardian of Time	Sir Gawain
1996	Dragon Fury II	Mason
1995	Dragon Fury	Mason
1995	Enter the Blood Ring	fighter
1994	Ring of Steel	Alex Freyer
Director (TV/Film/Web)
Year	Project	Notes
2005	Soldier of God	Second Unit Director
2001 - 2011	The Hunted	Director
1997	Deadlock	Second Unit Director
Writer (TV/Film/Web)
Year	Project	Notes
2001 - 2011	The Hunted	Director
1994	Ring of Steel	
Producer (TV/Film/Web)
Year	Project	Notes
2009 - 2011	The Hunted	Producer - 3 episodes

== Awards and recognition ==
Awards

Year	Association	Award/Recognition	Category	Nominee	Result	Reference
2010	Visual Effects Society	8th Visual Effects Society Awards	Outstanding Models and Miniatures in a Feature Motion Picture	For the National Air and Space Museum escape in the Night at the Museum: Battle of the Smithsonian: Robert Chapin (Digital Effects Supervisor), Tony Chen (Model Maker), Forest Fischer (Model Crew Chief), and Ian Hunter (Visual Effects Supervisor)	Nominated	

Recognition

- Action Martial Arts Star of the Year (2003) by the Hawaii Martial Arts International Society

== See also ==
- The Hunted (web series)
