= The Hunted (web series) =

- Genre: Action comedy
- Created by: Robert Chapin
- Country of origin: United States
- Original language: English

Production
- Production locations: Los Angeles, California
- Running time: 6-10 minutes

Original release
- Network: YouTube
- Release: April 22, 2001 – present

The Hunted is an American action comedy web series created by Robert Chapin. The show follows a group of people who have been bitten by vampires but have not yet been turned, and their attempts to prove the existence of vampires through the web series. The show has been described as a sword-slinging, vampire-slaying cross between the American TV shows Buffy the Vampire Slayer and Cops. Episodes have been filmed by amateur and professional filmmakers throughout the United States and overseas.

== Plot ==
The Hunted is a group of vampire attack survivors who band together to protect themselves from getting turned into cattle. They learn to curb their blood-lust in order to help other potential vampire victims, whom they protect using swords, martial arts and humor.

== Background ==
The Hunted franchise is based on user-generated content. To generate the series, fans and filmmakers (amateur and professional alike) are encouraged to write and film individual episodes of The Hunted to make a TV series. These episodes can then be uploaded to YouTube with a link to the main program. Contests with rewards, including cash prizes, are given to help encourage users to generate content. Entries are judged by a panel of industry professionals.

Initially, seventeen episodes were shot (mostly in Los Angeles) and were eventually made available on a 2-season DVD set and uploaded to YouTube in January 2007. The show has over 100 episodes online including unique content from 5 affiliate projects across the country and fans from around the world. The five main affiliates are The Hunted: NYCSS, the first women-powered series, which created jobs for non-binary and cisfemale artists. NYCSS was directed by Crystal Arnette and starred Orion Cho as Lou, a non-binary mystic. The Hunted: Tampa, The Hunted: Compton, The Chronicles of Kendall, and The Hunted: Expulsion, which has later been rebooted in the form of Hunted: Encore, directed by Ryan Gibeau and written by Ned Donovan with music by Marcus Bagala. The stories are 4–6 minutes so that multiple characters appear in arc-like episodes as opposed to telling a whole story in one chapter.

The show's series have been filmed by amateur and professional filmmakers throughout the United States. There have also been international episodes shot in Canada and South Africa. The second season of The Hunted: Encore came online in November 2017.

== History ==
The first episode premiered on the show's website on April 22, 2001.The series continues to feature new episodes, making it one of the longest-running online shows. The show was originally created as a performance venue for Robert Chapin's stage combat students. It also became an opportunity for creative people to develop their skill in writing, acting, directing and editing without the pressures of a big-budget production.

Over the years, the show has developed an International fan base, which was instrumental in financing The Hunted Feature Film.

== Feature film ==
The Hunted received financial support in June, 2011, via a Kickstarter campaign. The funds raised were used to finance the creation of a feature film based on the series. The film was shot in August, 2012, and post-production was completed in March, 2015. The series received support from New Deal Studios.

== Cast ==
The web series The Hunted lacks a fixed cast. Its short production schedule—typically limited to weekend shoots—enables it to secure industry actors, directors, stunt coordinators, and locations such as the Hollywood Bowl. The series relies on public input and user-generated content, allowing external contributors to produce individual episodes.

Some better-known cast members include Robert Chapin, Anthony De Longis, Roberta Brown, Andrew Helm and Reuben Langdon.

== Recognition ==
- The web series was an Official Selection in the Action on Film International Film Festival.
- The Hunted was an Official Selection in the Vampire Film Festival 2010.
- The web series was an Official Selection in Gencon 2010.
- The Hunted was an Official Selection in The Combat Con in 2011, where Derek Conley, Jessica Cail, Andrew Helm, and Kendall Wells of the web series were chosen as presenters along with 36 others.
- The Hunted was nominated for two 8th Annual Indie Series Awards in the categories Best Special/Visual Effects and Best Soundtrack.
- The Hunted: Encore became the winner of the 2017 LA Webfest, winning in two categories for Outstanding Score and Trailer Of The Year.
- The show was a semi-finalist of the FirstGlance Los Angeles Film Festival.

== See also ==
- Vampire film
- List of vampire television series
