= Tattooed Teenage Alien Fighters from Beverly Hills =

American children's television series

- Opening title card
- Genre: Superhero
- Created by: Jim Fisher; Jim Staahl
- Starring: Leslie Danon; Richard Nason; K. Jill Sorgen; Rugg Williams
- Voices of: Glenn Shadix; Ed Gilbert; David Lander
- Composers: Michael Turner; Steve Griffen
- Country of origin: United States
- Original language: English
- No. of episodes: 40

Production
- Executive producers: Andy Heyward; Robby London
- Producer: Nancy May
- Running time: 27 minutes
- Production company: DIC Productions, L.P.

Original release
- Network: USA Network (USA Cartoon Express)
- Release: October 3, 1994 – April 14, 1995

Tattooed Teenage Alien Fighters from Beverly Hills is an American children's television series produced by DIC Entertainment. It aired on USA Cartoon Express, a kids' block on the USA Network, from 1994 to 1995. Reruns of the show later aired during the Cookie Jar Toons block on This TV from 2011 to 2012. The series is about four teens who are picked by an alien to fight off monsters, while also finding the time to overcome problems at school.

== Synopsis ==
The series is set in Beverly Hills, California. The four central characters are teenagers who are selected by a blobby alien named Nimbar to fight off the monsters sent by the evil Emperor Gorganus of the planet Meleculah. Emperor Gorganus wants to conquer Earth because it is the focal point for a network of "Power Portals" that would facilitate conquest of the galaxy. In the first episode, Nimbar recruits the four high school students and gives them each a special tattoo based on a constellation in the celestial sphere. When their tattoos flash, this means Nimbar needs them and a portal appears that they can pass through to enter his chamber.

The teens use platforms called "Transo Discs" to teleport to the scene of the monster attack, where they are transformed into masked "Galactic Sentinels". The group is able to summon a more powerful Galactic Sentinel called Knightron by placing their hands in an interlocking square.

In one episode, there was a temporary replacement for Laurie when she was injured badly by Predaraptor. He is known as Orion in sentinel mode, his true form. Orion's true name is unpronouncable to humans, so he is simply called Rick.

They frequently could be seen in the Cafe Maison coffee shop at which Drew worked as a waitress and cashier. Drew's aunt, a famous soap opera actress named Nicole Nash, once attempted to purchase the coffee house, but decided against it after running into various issues planning a party there (though the issues were all excuses made by the Sentinels, trying to keep her away from a bomb sent by Emperor Gorganus).

One difference between Mighty Morphin Power Rangers and this show is that in this show, people noted they were missing. When Drew's aunt confronted her and Drew revealed her secret, she brought her to a psychiatrist to help with her "delusions". It also differed from similar shows in that the heroes were not good friends and in that they sometimes had trouble getting along.

The show also featured at least one episode that made a jab at the "monster of the day" convention by showing how tactically unsound the practice is for conquering a planet. Emperor Gorganus went on vacation in one episode and his unintelligent pet purple bird Lechner tried to conquer Earth in his absence. Lechner's inexperience with the computer systems causes him to send and recall the monster repeatedly, confusing Nimbar to the point of mental regression and nearly winning the day.

The Galactic Sentinels must not reveal their true identity to anyone. In the event that someone happens to follow them through a power portal, they will end up being subjected to the Memory Fader once the monster that Emperor Gorganus sends is defeated. Unlike Power Rangers, not even the main villain knew the identity of the sentinels. Several episodes had the Sentinels trying to prevent Gorganus from learning their identities.

== Characters ==
=== Galactic Sentinels ===
Press photo of the main characters: Gordon, Laurie, Swinton, and Drew

The Galactic Sentinels are champions of Nimbar who can be summoned to him when the tattoos bestowed upon them flash:

- Laurie Foster (portrayed by Leslie Danon) is the leader of the Galactic Sentinels. Smart, sensible, and very organized, she is a cheerleader and the most popular girl in school. As Scorpio the Scorpion (Scorpio performed by Teresa Fahl), she wields a slim-bladed sword that, like all Galactic Sentinel weapons, fires energy blasts.
- Gordon Henley (portrayed by Richard Nason): Although not very likable at first with his preppy-style obsession with money and status, he quickly earns his title. He becomes Taurus the Bull (Taurus performed by John Wilson), who wields a staff.
- Drew Vincent (portrayed by Jill Urbach, credited as K. Jill Sorgen) is a smart tough girl who works at the coffee shop the kids regularly hang out in and wants to be a poet/performance artist. She becomes Centaurus the Centaur (Centaur performed by Teresa Davis), who sports a purple outfit. She wields a combination of a trident/battle axe.
- Swinton Sawyer (portrayed by Rugg Williams) is the shy, hyperintelligent brains of the group. He wears a yellow suit and holds the power of the Roman God Apollo (Apollo performed by William Glenn). His weapon is an unnamed double-bladed weapon.
- Rick (portrayed by Kevin Castro) is an alien warrior working with Nimbar and the sole survivor of his planet, resulting in him becoming cold, distant, and full of anger toward Nimbar and the other guardians. He holds the power of Orion the Hunter. His name is too complicated for humans to speak so he insists that they and Nimbar call him "Rick". His suit is silver and his fellow Sentinels were Leo the Lion, Draco the Dragon, and Ursa the Great Bear, who were badly defeated by Predaraptor.
- Knightron is a silver-armored knight who is the combination of any four Galactic Sentinels. He is the Ultimate Galactic Sentinel that wields a sword and a shield, but Knightron's power is "finite" and the Galactic Sentinels are only to form him as a last resort. According to series fight coordinator Robert Chapin, stunt actors Jim Kratt and Deron McBee alternated wearing the armor; both Kratt and McBee were uncredited.

=== Villains ===
- Emperor Gorganus (performed by Josh Culp, voiced by Ed Gilbert) is the primary antagonist of the series and ruler of the planet Meleculah. Gorganus wants to conquer Earth because it is the focal point for a network of "Power Portals" that would facilitate conquest of the galaxy. He views the battles between his monsters and the Galactic Sentinels through a lens-like device.
  - Lechner (voiced by David Lander) is Gorganus' pet bird. He tends to irritate Gorganus with his often quite sensible questions and grovels expertly when the Emperor threatens him. Gorganus often uses Lechner as his scapegoat for the failure of his plans.

==== Monsters ====
These are monstrous mercenaries with various abilities that Gorganus sends to Earth for various tasks. Gorganus can reconstruct his monsters if they are destroyed, modify the monsters' powers, strengthen them, or even transfer the powers of one monster into another. The following monsters have been used:

- Ninjabot (performed by Gary Kasper) is a robotic samurai-like monster. He is armed with a katana that can shoot energy bolts. Ninjabot is one of the few monsters capable of speech.
- Neuragula is a brain monster with two hemispheres: one controlling emotions, the other controlling intelligence. Neuragula's most distinguishing ability would be his ear-piercing screech. He could shoot laser beams, create energy prisons, and could mind control his victims. Neuragula is one of the few monsters capable of speech.
- The Sorcerer is a masked, robed wizard who is one of Gorganus' most cunning and nefarious monsters. He can use magical attacks and can teleport. The Sorcerer also uses a wand which he can transform into a sword.
- Voldek (performed by Gary Kasper) is a knight-like monster who can generate static electricity.
- Slaygar is a toxic waste monster.
- Octodroid is an octopus-like monster. He has the ability to turn freshwater into saltwater, drain moisture, and attack with his tentacles.
- Isolus (performed by Mary Reid) is a four-eyed monster with power over ice. Besides her usual ice attacks, she wields a sword and shield, with her sword channeling her ice attacks. Isolus is one of the few monsters capable of speech.
- Culebra is a king cobra-like monster who can breathe heat.
- Predaraptor is a dinosaur-like monster that is nearly indestructible and evokes the traits of a Tyrannosaurus and a Velociraptor. He can emit deadly beams of energy.
- Snake Trooper (performed by Terence Rotolo) is a snake-like monster and can shoot lasers from his hands.

=== Other characters ===
- Nimbar (voiced by Glenn Shadix) is a gelatinous glowing blob of flesh with high intelligence that calls the teens together, controls and retains their powers and opens portals to and from Earth. Nimbar is the Head Protector of the Power Portals and he grants his soldiers tattoos with which to communicate and open portals near by swiping an armlike extension over their wrist. He has failed in the past to protect a world from Gorganus and will stop at nothing to ensure Earth does not meet the same fate.
- Diane Henley (portrayed by Dani Douthette) is Gordon's mother and the Mayor of Beverly Hills who is usually too busy to spend much time with her son. In "The Ghost Warrior", she temporarily learns that Gordon is Taurus until the Memory Fader is used on her after the Sorcerer's defeat.
- Nicole Nash (portrayed by Janna Lowell) is an actress who is Drew's aunt.
- Roland Sawyer (portrayed by Charles Walker) is Swinton's father and the editor-in-chief of a local newspaper. In "Mind Games", he planned to transfer Swinton to Billwood Academy until Drew as Swinton asserted himself.
- Sam (portrayed by Jeff Doucette) is the manager of the Coffee House "Cafe Maison". Ironically, Sam is only seen in an episode showcasing alternate realities. In the ordinary reality, he is only referred to offscreen.
- Pixel (voiced by Debi Derryberry) is an alien from Hunab Ku who appears in "The Opiate from the Future". Her species has the ability to predict the future, which results in her captured by Gorganus and exploited for her abilities. The Galactic Sentinels rescue Pixel from Slaygar and return her to Hunab Ku.
- Dr. Bradford Clamtin (portrayed by Beans Morocco) is a psychiatrist who appears in the two-part episode "The Psychiatrist". He is called in by Nicole Nash to work on therapy with Drew. Clamtin discovers the truth about the Galactic Sentinels, only to have his memories erased.

== Episodes ==
1. "In the Beginning...." – Emperor Gorganus makes his plans to conquer Earth and sends Ninjabot to attack Earth. Nimbar selects four teens to be his champions and become Galactic Sentinels.
2. "The Note" – Drew writes a note to make Gordon think Laurie likes him to prove he just follows rules. Meanwhile, Emperor Gorganus sends Neuragula to Earth.
3. "How Time Flies" – Emperor Gorganus sends the Sorcerer to speed up time on Earth which causes some problems for the Galactic Sentinels.
4. "Switch" – The Galactic Sentinels accidentally switch genders, changing bodies and lives during their fight with Voldek.
5. "Perceptions" – Swinton gets advice from everyone on how to talk to a pretty girl. Meanwhile, Emperor Gorganus sends Slaygar to pollute the Earth.
6. "Three Cheats to the Wind" – Drew works on her essay of Les Misérables. Meanwhile, Emperor Gorganus sends Octodroid to change the Earth's freshwater into saltwater.
7. "The Quitter" – Neuragala uses his powers to turn Laurie into a selfish brat, causing her to quit the Galactic Sentinels and leaving the others powerless to stop Neuragula.
8. "Commitments" – Drew and Gordon pose as a couple when they use the bracelet belonging to Gordon's mom to save the world.
9. "Mind Games" – The Galactic Sentinels bring the Sorcerer's wand which causes Nimbar to act strangely and causes him to disband the Galactic Sentinels. Meanwhile, Swinton tells the others that his parents plan on transferring him to the Billwood Academy.
10. "The Spy" – Emperor Gorganus sends Isolus to Earth disguised as a foreign exchange student named Ilse Lang.
11. "The Brain Drain" – Gorganus sends Neuragula to drain the minds of the people on Earth.
12. "A Nightmare on Rodeo Drive" – Emperor Gorganus sends the Sorcerer to bring the nightmares of the Galactic Sentinels to life.
13. "The Rat" – Gordon ends up having his mind transmodified into Swinton's mouse Darwin upon going through the Power Portal with him at the same time. Meanwhile, Emperor Gorganus sends Culebra to raise Earth's temperature.
14. "The Cover-Up" – Emperor Gorganus sends Octodroid to capture a Galactic Sentinel. He manages to successfully capture Swinton and now the others have to find a way to rescue him while trying to cover-up where Swinton is to his father.
15. "Bully For You" – An attempt to restore Swinton's confidence by disguising Gordon as Culebra backfires when the real Culebra appears and almost destroys the Galactic Sentinels.
16. "Trust" – Laurie, Gordon, and Swinton read from Drew's diary when it comes to her family life. Meanwhile, Emperor Gorganus sends Voldek to knock out Earth's electrical grid.
17. "The Y Files" – Two government agents arrive in Beverly Hills and consider it as Ground Zero for all extraterrestrial sightings. Meanwhile, Emperor Gorganus sends Isolus to Earth's desert in order to plunge the Earth into the next Ice Age.
18. "The Chocolate War" – Thanks to Emperor Gorganus and Culebra, a friendly competition gets out of hand and threatens the ability of the Galactic Sentinels to form Knighttron.
19. "The Monster Among Us" – Gordon misses out on the date of a lifetime as Emperor Gorganus and Octodroid replaces Taurus with a look-alike android.
20. "The Universal Hitchhiker" – Drew learns a lesson in believing in others when she redeems a fallen Sentinel called Orion that ends up saving the Galactic Sentinels from Predaraptor.
21. "Deja Vu" – The Galactic Sentinels have to live a party life over and over until they get it right and destroy Neuragula who has trapped them in a time loop.
22. "The Ghost Warrior" – Emperor Gorganus sends the Sorcerer to Earth disguised as Taurus in order to make a public appearance in a plot to lure out the Galactic Sentinels.
23. "The Opiate from the Future" – Emperor Gorganus sends Slaygar to capture Pixel, an alien from Hunab Ku whose kind can predict the future. When the Galactic Sentinels rescue Pixel, they hope to use Pixel in their advantage during their fight against Emperor Gorganus.
24. "The Leech" – The Sorcerer places a Mind Leech onto Drew in order to find out the identities of the Galactic Sentinels. The Mind Leech ends up causing a personality change in Drew.
25. "Gordon Cries Wolf" – Gordon's white lie gets him in trouble when he ends up involving Laurie when he overhears that a student named Brad is going to ask her out and then diss her. Meanwhile, Emperor Gorganus sends an upgraded Isolus to destroy the Galactic Sentinels.
26. "Penny for Your Thoughts" – Laurie believes she has the ability to read minds as a Residual Effect from portaling, but what she hears is not nice and is on the verge of tearing the team apart when they discover that the false thoughts were planted by Neuragula.
27. "Turncoat" – Given an opportunity by Ninjabot to save Earth forever from Emperor Gorganus, the Galactic Sentinels learn they cannot pass along their problems to somebody else.
28. "Mr. Popularity" – After being hit by Wish Dust emitted from Predaraptor's tail, Swinton discovers he should be careful what he wishes that might come true, especially if Emperor Gorganus can use it to destroy the Galactic Sentinels.
29. "Winner Takes All" – The teens decide to be friends, only to learn friendship has its pitfalls, when Earth is at stake when Emperor Gorganus sends Ninjabot to challenge the Galactic Sentinels.
30. "Beverly Hills 902-Oblivion" – The Galactic Sentinels must defend the homefront when it is discovered that a Bal Darian Portal Torpedo has been portaled back to the Coffeehouse with them following their fight with Predaraptor.
31. "Ozone O-Mio" – Emperor Gorganus sends Slaygar to suck up the Earth's ozone layer while Gordon is busy sucking up to Swinton's father.
32. "The Glitch" – While fighting Voldek, the Power Portal develops a malfunction which sends the Galactic Sentinels to some strange parallel universes where Zsa Zsa Gabor is the Mayor of Beverly Hills.
33. "Emperor for a Day" – Swinton tries to take a test that would get him into college. Meanwhile, Emperor Gorganus goes on vacation and Lechner watches over the palace while Emperor Gorganus is away. Lechner almost succeeds in driving Nimbar to the breaking point with Culebra's appearing and disappearing from Earth.
34. "The Impostor" – Aunt Nicole's soap opera "Storm and Stress" bases a new character on Drew, and Laurie lands the role. Laurie begins to emulate Drew in an attempt to "get in character". Drew's resentment at this threatens to destroy the Sentinels' team unity when Emperor Gorganus sends Voldek to Earth.
35. "Take Two Galactic Sentinels and Call Nimbar in the Morning" – The common cold almost causes the destruction of the Earth when it sweeps through the ranks of the Galactic Sentinels, ultimately afflicting even Nimbar. Meanwhile, Emperor Gorganus sends Isolus to reverse Earth's temperatures.
36. "The Last People on Earth" – Gordon tries to find the guy who ripped him off with the fake CD player. Meanwhile, Emperor Gorganus gives Voldek a Lifeform Compressor in order to collect the people of Earth.
37. "The Primal Scream" – Emperor Gorganus attempts to activate a Portal Jammer which will defeat Nimbar. Drew, Swinton and Gordon race the clock to reverse a galactic virus which is de-evolving Laurie into a deranged monster while fighting Slaygar at the same time.
38. "The Psychiatrist" Pt. 1 – The Galactic Sentinels face discovery, when Drew has to meet a psychiatrist named Dr. Bradford Clamtin who wants to institutionalize her. Meanwhile, Emperor Gorganus installs a memory-enhancing chip into Snake Trooper so that he can anticipate the Galactic Sentinels' every move.
39. "The Psychiatrist" Pt. 2 – Dr. Bradford Clamtin discovers the truth about the Galactic Sentinels as Snake Trooper begins his next attack.
40. "It's a Gorganus Life" – On Christmas, Drew is eager to see It's a Wonderful Life and Nimbar plans to teach the Galactic Sentinels a lesson by placing them in a hologram to show what would happen if Emperor Gorganus had conquered Earth. Emperor Gorganus takes the opportunity to reprogram the hologram so that he can have an advantage when he fights the Galactic Sentinels himself.

== Production ==
According to comments from USA Network prior to its release, the series had initially been planned to mix new American footage with pre-existing tokusatsu scenes from an unnamed series in a manner similar to Mighty Morphin Power Rangers but this route was abandoned and instead would consist entirely of American-shot footage.

== Broadcast ==
The series was broadcast in the United States on the USA Network beginning on September 19, 1994, airing Mondays through Thursdays in the 6:00 p.m. time slot.

From 2011 to 2012, reruns of Tattooed Teenage Alien Fighters aired during the Cookie Jar Toons block on This TV. Its time slot was at 9:00 a.m., right before Liberty's Kids.

== Home media ==
In 2013, Mill Creek Entertainment (under license from DHX Media) released the complete series on DVD in Region 1.

== Critical reception ==
A Syfy Wire video positively reviewed the show's "campy" tone and compared it to Mighty Morphin Power Rangers. Comic Book Resources gave a positive review to the series, complimenting its writing, character's development, and action-packed scenes, but criticized its low budget.
