= Rudolph J. Wojta =

Austrian journalist (born 1944)

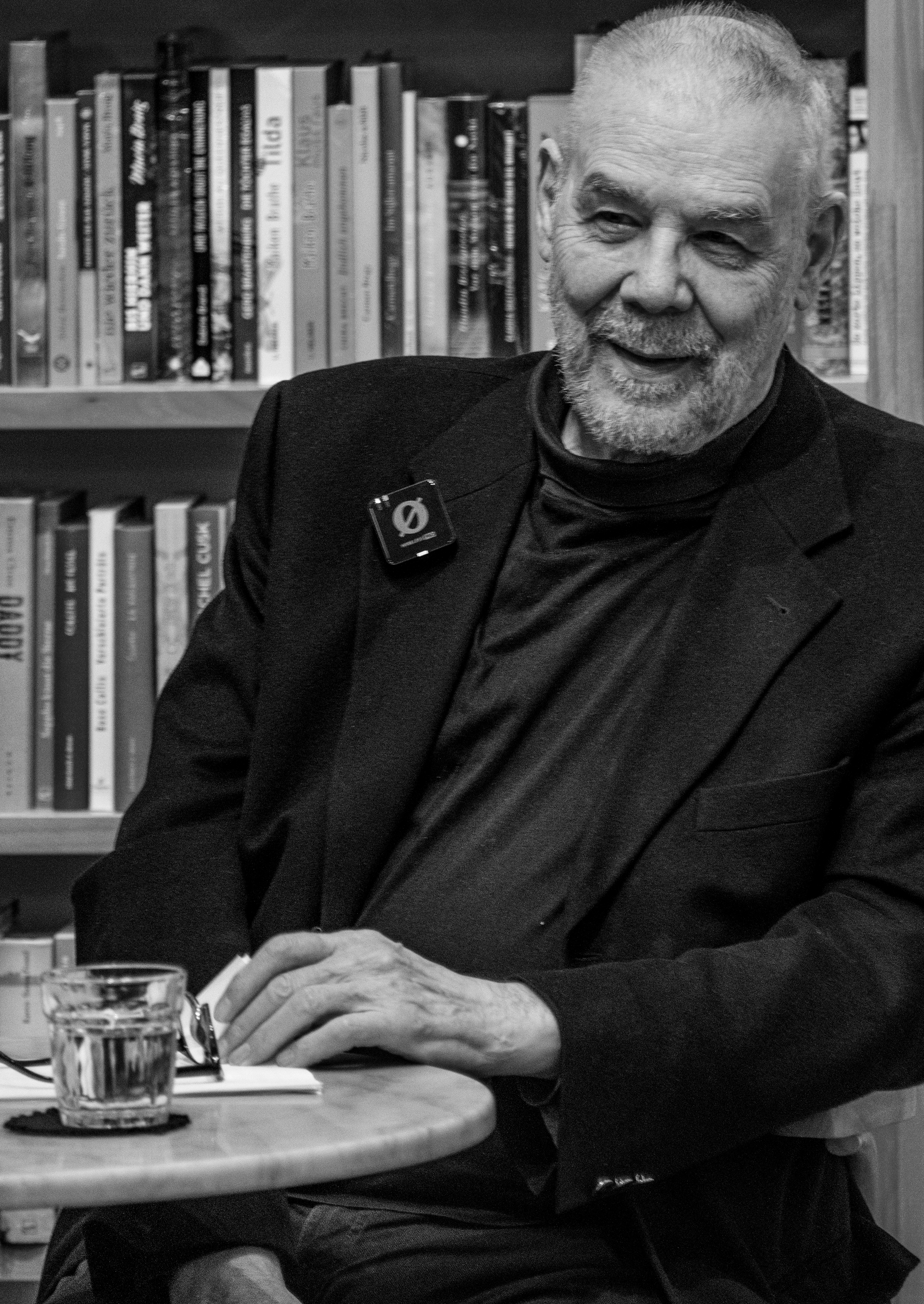
Rudolph J. Wojta

Rudolph J. Wojta (born August 10, 1944) is an Austrian journalist and novelist. He also published criminal novels under the pen name Sebastian Benedict.

== Life and work ==
Wojta was born and raised in Vienna. While studying literature and psychology he began to publish short stories in German and Austrian newspapers, including Die Welt and Die Presse. In 1975, he joined the weekly newspaper Wochenpresse as critic in the fields of architecture, literature, theatre, cinema and art. In 1979 he joined the newly founded magazine Wiener for which he served as editor in chief from 1981 to 1982. There he cooperated closely with the founder of the magazine, Gert Winkler. He then rejoined the Wochenpresse where he remained until the newspaper folded in 1996. Subsequently, he worked as freelance writer, author and contributor. In 2002, together with Nicholas Allen he founded Shakespeare in Styria, an annual festival in the town of Murau showcasing a Shakespeare play in English with young European professional actors. He lived in Murau for eight years. In 2010 he returned to Vienna.

Zerfall der Lage is, according to Michael Pfeffer, “an intense novel on a young poet who was installed in a small piece during the winter of 1930/31 to write a majeure oeuvre”. The story is located in Döbling and it is inspired by the life of Heimito von Doderer. Doderer's plans to put writing before life fails; The novel deals with repressed memories and the obsessive search for a lost love, ultimately with the disintegration of a personality.

== Books ==
- Operation Fledermaus, Crime story, Querverlag 2013 (as Sebastian Benedict), ISBN 978-3-89656-210-4
- Zerfall der Lage, Verlag Klingenberg 2024, ISBN 978-3-903284-33-3
- Das Haus am See, Oberst Johams erster Fall, Crime story, Verlag Klingenberg 2026 (as Sebastian Benedict), ISBN 978-3-903284-65-4
