= Wiener (magazine) =

Austrian men's magazine

- Logo
- Editor-in-Chief: Franz J. Sauer
- Categories: Men's magazine
- Frequency: Monthly
- Publisher: Wiener Verlags
- Founder: Gert Winkler
- Founded: 1979
- First issue: 1 September 1979; 47 years ago
- Company: Josel & Sauer GmbH
- Country: Austria
- Based in: Vienna
- Language: German
- Website: Wiener

Wiener is a German language monthly men's magazine published in Vienna, Austria. It has been in circulation since 1979, created by Gert Winkler.

== History and profile ==
Wiener was established in 1979 by Gert Winkler, Günther Lebisch and Michael Satke. The first issue was published in September 1979. After four issues the magazine had to declare bankruptcy. In May 1980, Gert Winkler started a new launch of the magazine, now supported by Hans Schmid, the owner of the advertising agency GGK Wien. The founding art directors of the second WIENER were Michael Beran and Lo Breier. The first editor-in-chief was Rudolph J. Wojta.

Initially Wiener carried articles on Vienna and its cultural scene. It became famous for its avant-garde style, created by fashion and portrait photographers Gerhard Heller and Elfie Semotan as well as street photographers Paul Schirnhofer and Götz Schrage. Right at the magazine's launch, a series about Viennese Actionism caused a scandal.

Later the WIENER changed its scope and became a men's fashion and lifestyle magazine. The magazine which is published monthly 11 times per year features interviews and articles about celebrities and trends. Editors-in-chief — after Rudolph J. Wojta — were Franz Manola (1982), Michael Hopp and Markus Peichl (1982–1985), Gerd Leitgeb (1987–1994), Wolfgang Höllrigl (1994–), Andreas Wollinger (1997–1999), Peter Mosser (2000–2006), Alexander Macheck (2006–2008), Maximilian Mondel (2008), Gundi Bittermann (2008–2009), Helfried Bauer (2009–?), Wolfgang Wieser (2010–2015) and Franz J. Sauer (since 2015).

From 1980 til 1999 Metro Zeitschriften Verlag was the publisher, thereafter D & R (founded by A. Dressler and C. Radda). In the year 2000 the Styria Multi Media company bought the magazine.

== Circulation ==
The 1985 circulation of Wiener was 118,000 copies. Its circulation was 45,000 copies in 2007 and 47,500 copies in 2010. The magazine had a circulation of 43,820 copies between January and June 2014.

== Incidents ==
Kurt Waldheim sued both Wiener and Stern in 1987 for publishing articles about his Nazi activities in Yugoslavia. In the September 2010 issue of Wiener, nude photos of ballerina Karina Sarkissova were published. Following the publication Sarkissova was fired from the ballet company of the Vienna State Opera in October 2010.

== See also ==
- List of magazines in Austria
