= Nicholas Allen (theatre director) =

Austrian theatre manager and director

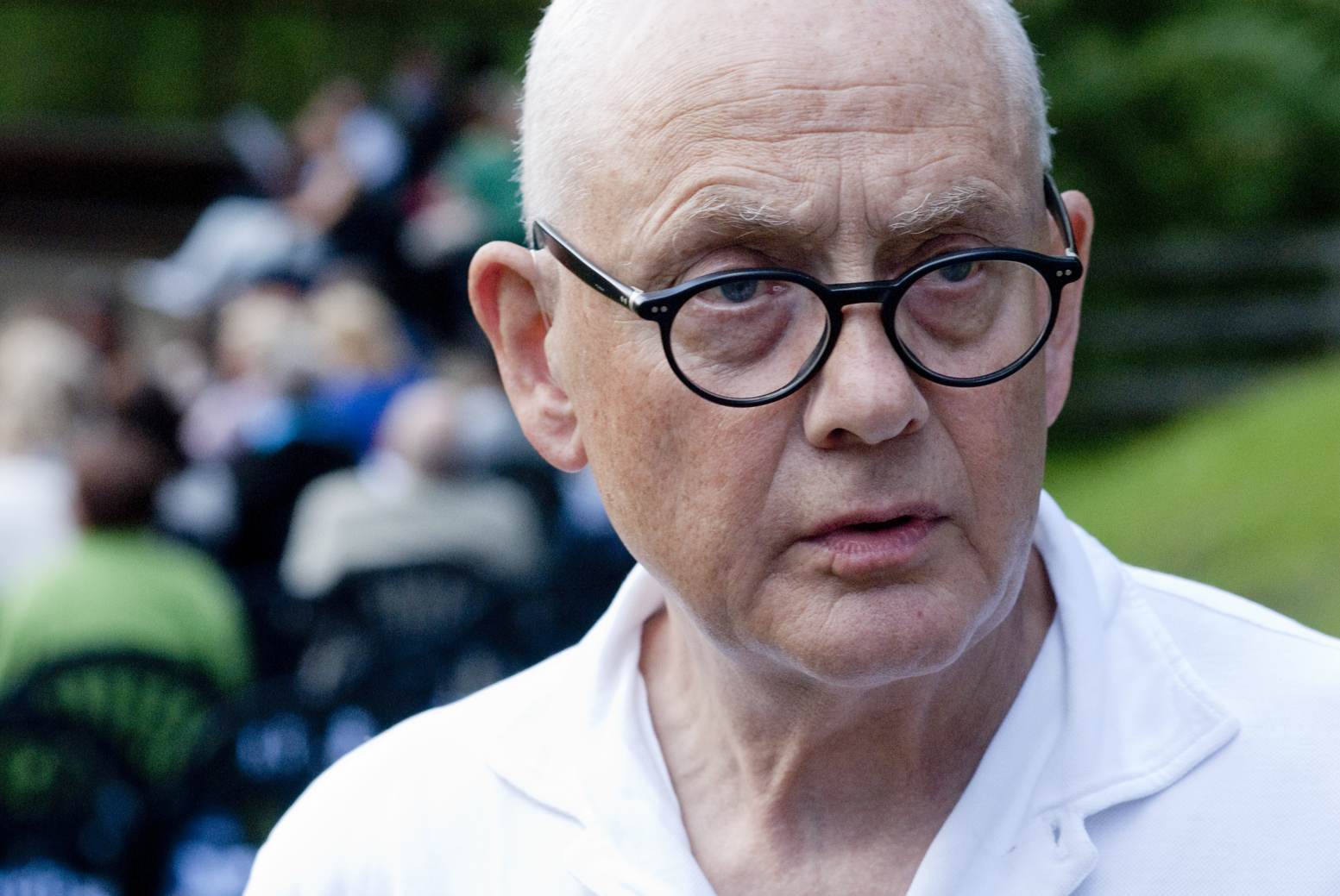
At Shakespeare in Styria, 2014

Nicholas Allen (*1947 in Leeds, England) is a British–Austrian theatre pedagogue, actor and stage director. He is also the founder of Shakespeare in Styria.

== Life and career ==
Allen attended Rugby School and briefly studied at Sussex University. In 1966, he settled in Vienna to continue his studies in music and acting. The following year he joined Vienna's English Theatre as an actor and remained in this institution – with one absence of three years – until his retirement in 2009. From 1971 to 1994 he was responsible for the theatre's schools touring operation; in cooperation with the Federal Ministry of Education, Arts and Culture the theatre presented English language plays with professional British and American actors in schools throughout Austria, and later also in Southern Germany, South Tyrol, Switzerland and Czechoslovakia. By the end of his period of office the operation had increased from one production per year, seen by approximately 15.000 pupils, to five annual productions in English and French, seen by approximately 220.000 pupils per year.

From 1994 to 1997, Allen worked at the legendary British Book Shop in Vienna. Thereafter he returned to Vienna's English Theatre in order to start up a programme for English theatre-workshops in Austrian schools. Again he toured the whole country and Southern Germany and added teacher-training to this endeavour. In 2001, he developed a new workshop format introducing the British art of Debate to senior pupils and teachers throughout Austria. He still continues with this work today.

Shakespeare in Styria
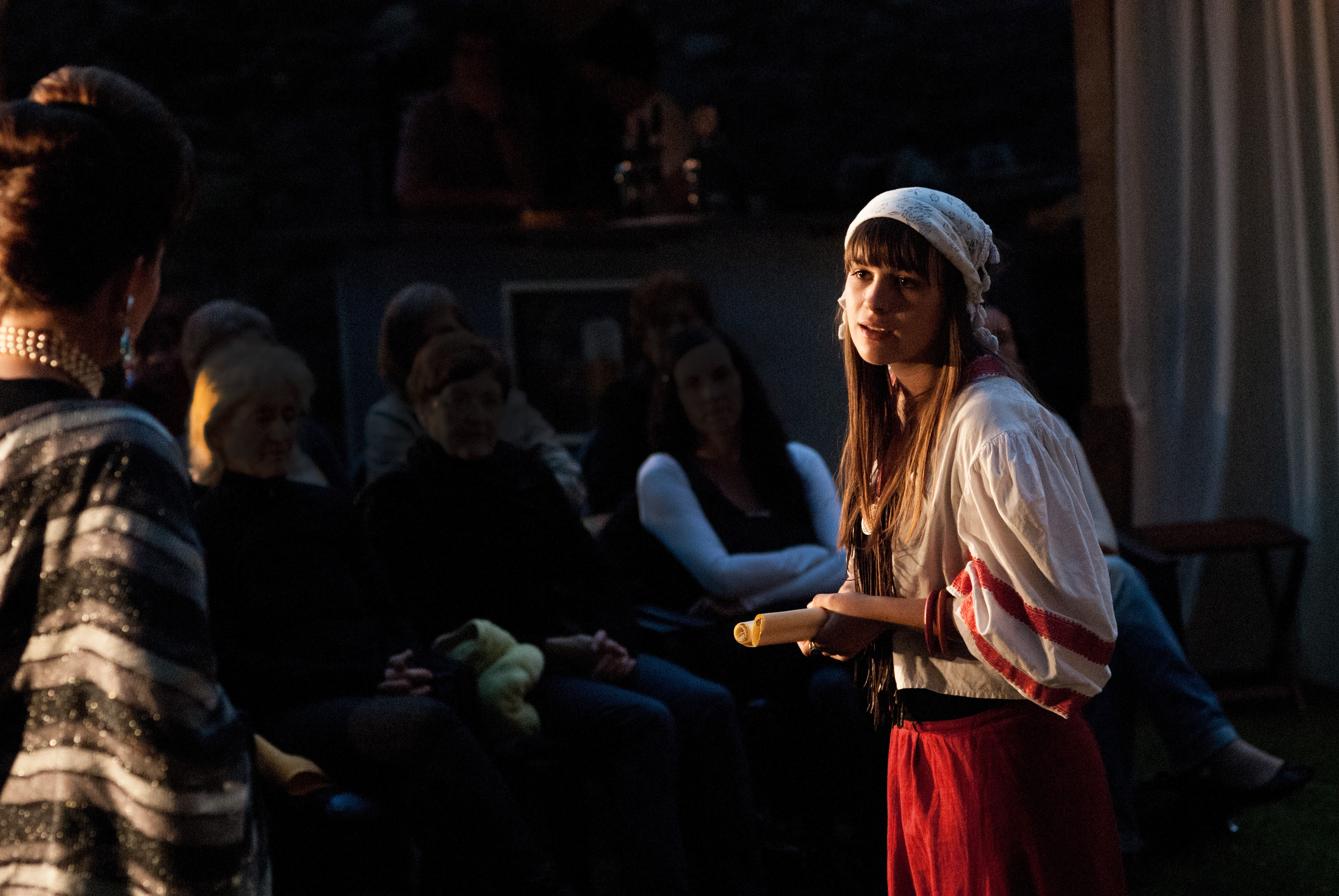
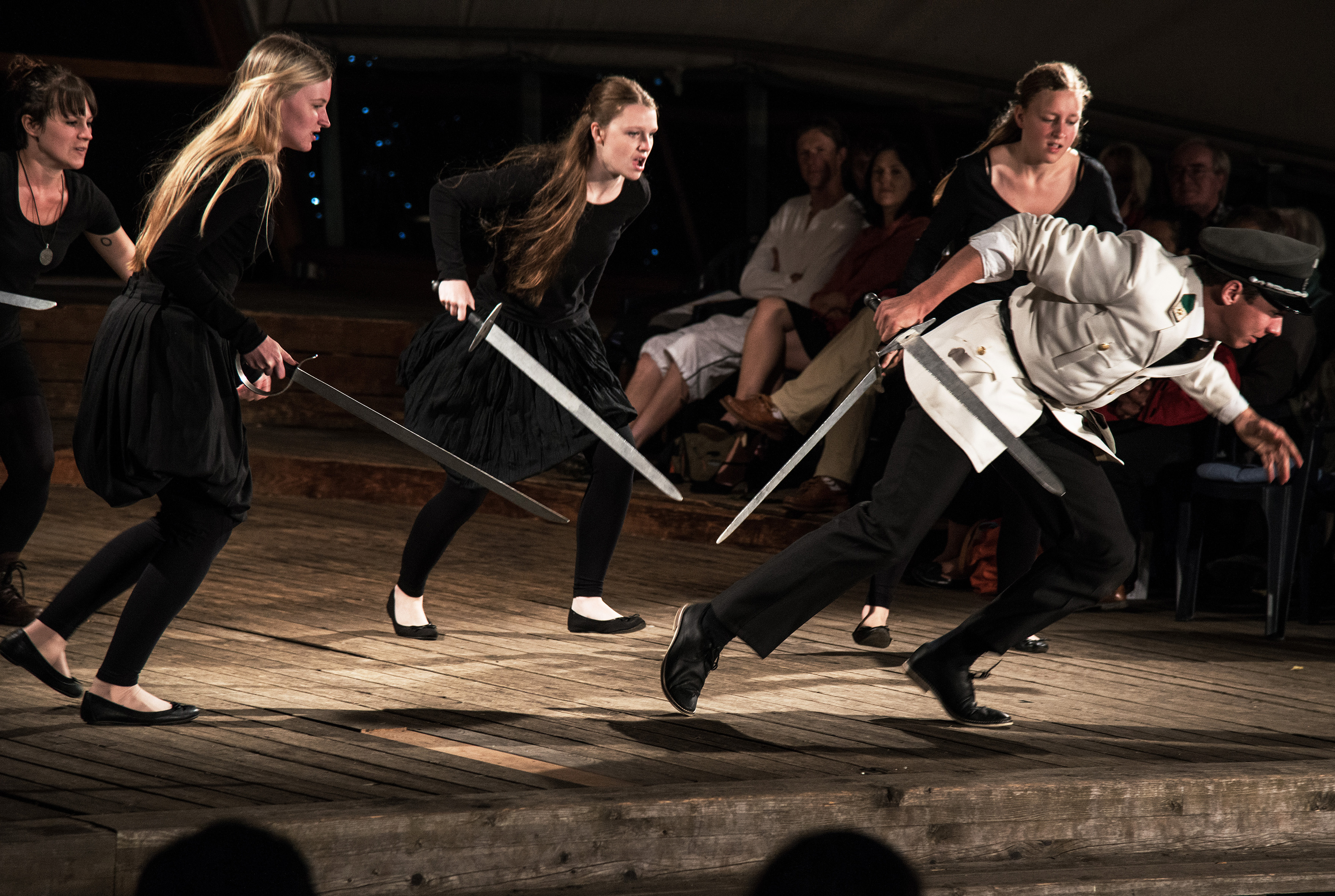
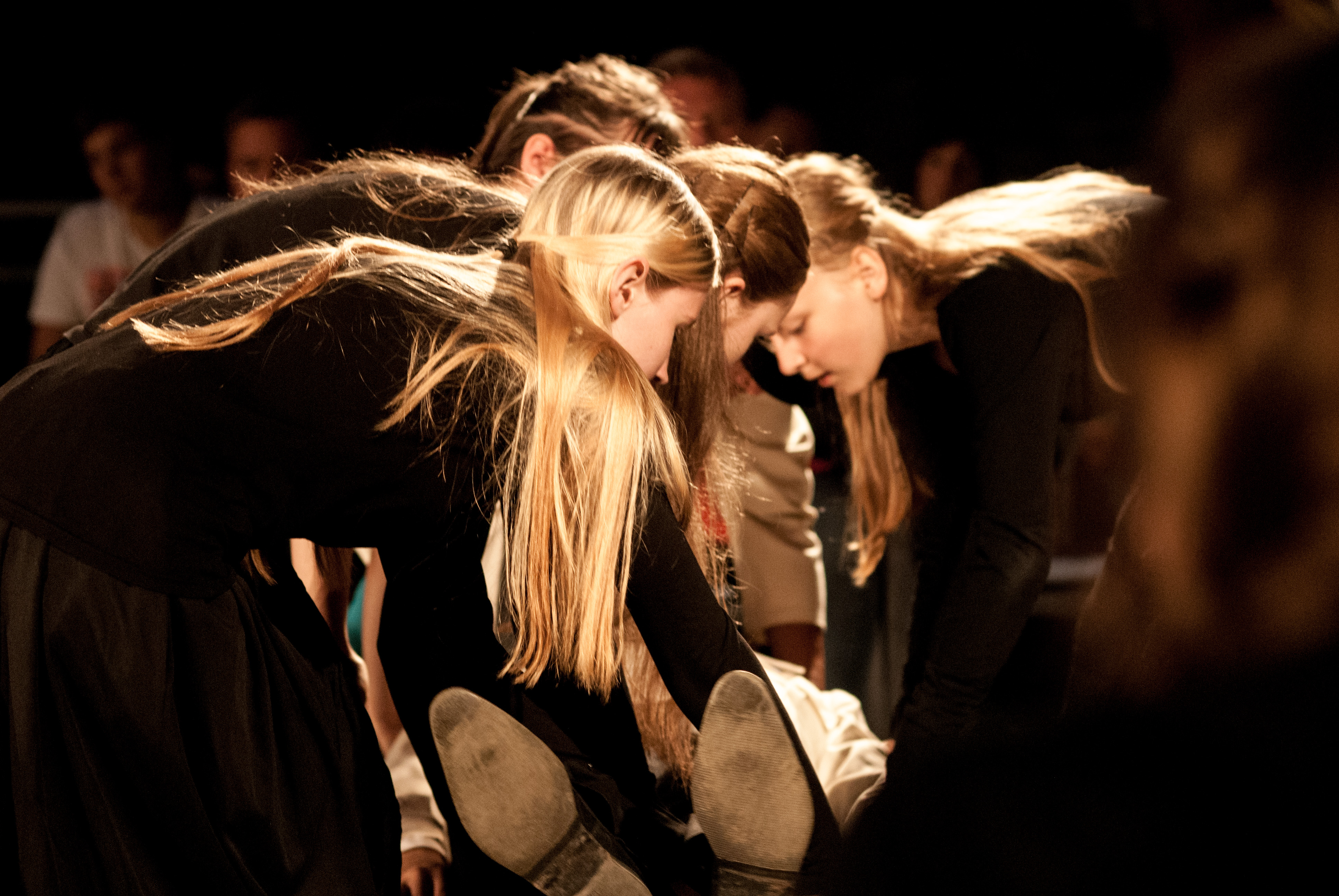
Julius Caesar, directed by Nicholas Allen and Roberta Brown, Murau 2014

In 2002, together with Rudolph J. Wojta he founded Shakespeare in Styria, an annual staging of a Shakespeare play in the small town of Murau in the Styrian Alps. From modest beginnings as a teacher/student training programme the project has developed into a small annual festival with professional actors. In 2014, together with Roberta Brown he directed Shakespeare's Julius Caesar at the Murau festival.

Since 2005, Allen has been involved with SoHo, a social democratic organization for homosexual rights.

== Honours ==
- 1991 Austrian Cross of Honour for Science and Art
- 2001 Citizenship of the Republic of Austria awarded for services in the field of education and culture
- 2013 Honorary Title of Professor awarded by the President of Austria
- 2014 Golden Needle of Honour of the Town of Murau
