= The Human Spider =

Human Spider, The Human Spider or The Human-Spider may refer to:

== People ==
- Bill Strother, who scaled the Heard Building in 1922
- Real-life comparisons of the Marvel character Spider-Man including:
  - Alain Robert (born 1962), French rock climber and urban climber

== Characters ==
- Arachnida from The Show, a 1927 American silent film
- Fineas Sproule from Billy the Kid's Old Timey Oddities, an American comic book series
- Mankot, the ride of Gojo from the comic book Gojo
- Human Spider, Peter Parker's introductory alias in the 2002 film Spider-Man
- The Human Spider, a contestant in the "Superhero Tryouts" segment of the BBC comedy sketch show The Wrong Door

== Television ==
- "The Human Spider", a 2008 episode of the Channel 4 documentary Cutting Edge

== See also ==
- Spider-Man (nickname)
- Spider-Man (disambiguation)
- Spider (nickname)
- Spider Sisters, conjoined twins Ganga and Jamuna Mondal
