= Spider-Man (disambiguation) =

Spider-Man is a Marvel Comics superhero.

Spider-Man or Spiderman may also refer to:

== Marvel Entertainment ==
=== Characters ===
- List of incarnations of Spider-Man
- Alternative versions of Spider-Man

=== Comics ===
- Spider-Man, also known as Peter Parker: Spider-Man, multiple comic series

=== Film ===
- Spider-Man (1969 film), an unauthorized fan film by Donald F. Glut
- Spider-Man (1977 film), a theatrically released pilot for the 1970s US live-action series The Amazing Spider-Man
- Spider-Man (1978 film), a Japanese film connected to the Japanese live-action series
- Spider-Man (2002 film series), a live-action film trilogy by Sam Raimi, starring Tobey Maguire (2002–2007)
  - Spider-Man (2002 film), the first film in the series

=== Television ===
- Spider-Man (1967 TV series), an American-Canadian animated series that aired 1967–1970
- Spider-Man (Japanese TV series), a Japanese live-action tokusatsu series that aired 1978–1979
- Spider-Man (1981 TV series), a 1981–1982 American animated series
- Spider-Man: The Animated Series, a 1994–1998 American animated series
- Spider-Man: The New Animated Series, a 2003 American-Canadian CGI-animated series
- Spider-Man (2017 TV series), a 2017–2020 American animated series

=== Gaming ===
- Spider-Man (1982 video game), a game for the Atari 2600
- Spider-Man: The Video Game, a 1991 arcade title from Sega
- Spider-Man (1995 video game), a title from Acclaim
- Spider-Man (2000 video game), a title released by Activision
- Spider-Man (2002 video game), an Activision title based on the 2002 film
- Marvel's Spider-Man, 2018–present, a series of video games by Sony Interactive Entertainment
  - Marvel's Spider-Man (video game), 2018, the first game in the series

=== Music ===
- Spider-Man (soundtrack), the soundtrack album for the 2002 film
- "Spider-Man" (theme song), from the 1967 series
- Spider Man (album), 1965, by jazz vibraphonist Freddie McCoy

== Other uses ==
- Spider-Man (nickname), a list of people
- The Spider-Man, a mythical being in the "Turnabout Gallows" arc of the first volume of the Phoenix Wright: Ace Attorney manga series by Kodansha Comics
- Spider-Man (Japanese novel), a 1929 novel by Japanese author Edogawa Ranpo
- The Spider Man, a 1991 novel by Filipino author F. Sionil José

== See also ==
- Spider-Man 2 (disambiguation)
- Spider-Man 3 (disambiguation)
- Spidey (disambiguation)
- The Amazing Spider-Man, the main Spider-Man comic book published since 1963
  - The Amazing Spider-Man (disambiguation)
  - The Amazing Spider-Man 2 (disambiguation)
- Marvel's Spider-Man (disambiguation)
- Ultimate Spider-Man (disambiguation)
- Spider-Man in film
- Spider-Man in novels
- Spider-Man book series
- Spider-Man in literature
