= Spida =

Spida is a nickname of:

- Peter Everitt (born 1974), former Australian rules footballer
- Donovan Mitchell (born 1996), American basketball player

== See also ==
- Spider (nickname)
