= Marvel's Spider-Man (disambiguation) =

Marvel's Spider-Man is a series of action-adventure video games.

Marvel's Spider-Man may also refer to:

- Marvel's Spider-Man (video game), 2018
- Marvel's Spider-Man: Miles Morales, 2020 action-adventure game
- Marvel's Spider-Man 2, 2023 action-adventure game
- Spider-Man, a Marvel Comics superhero
- Spider-Man (2017 TV series), an animated series produced by Marvel Animation

== See also ==
- Spider-Man (disambiguation)
