= Spider-Man 2 (disambiguation) =

Spider-Man 2 is a 2004 American superhero film which forms part of Sam Raimi's Spider-Man trilogy.

Spider-Man 2 may also refer to:

- Spider-Man 2: Enter: Electro, a 2001 video game, sequel to Spider-Man (2000)
- Spider-Man 2: The Sinister Six, a 2001 video game for Game Boy Color, sequel to Spider-Man (2000) for Game Boy Color
- Spider-Man 2 (2004 video game), the video game based on the 2004 film
- Spider-Man 2 (soundtrack), the soundtrack of the 2004 film
- The Amazing Spider-Man 2, a 2014 American superhero film, sequel to The Amazing Spider-Man (2012)
- Spider-Man: Far From Home, a 2019 American superhero film, sequel to Spider-Man: Homecoming (2017)
- Marvel's Spider-Man 2, a 2023 video game, sequel to Marvel's Spider-Man (2018)
- Spider-Man: Across the Spider-Verse , a 2023 American animated superhero film, is a sequel to Spider-Man: Into the Spider-Verse (2018)

== See also ==
- Spider-Men II, a 2017 comic book miniseries, sequel to Spider-Men (2012)
- Spider-Man (disambiguation)
- Spider-Man 3 (disambiguation)
- The Amazing Spider-Man 2 (disambiguation)
