= Spider-Man 3 (disambiguation) =

Spider-Man 3 is a 2007 American superhero film and the third and final part of Sam Raimi's Spider-Man trilogy.

Spider-Man 3 may also refer to:

- Spider-Man 3 (video game), the video game based on the 2007 film
- Spider-Man 3 (soundtrack), the soundtrack of the 2007 film
- Spider-Man: No Way Home, a 2021 American superhero film, the third Spider-Man film in the Marvel Cinematic Universe

== See also ==
- List of Spider-Man titles
- Spider-Man in film
- Spider-Man 2 (disambiguation)
- Spider-Man (disambiguation)
