= The Amazing Spider-Man (disambiguation) =

The Amazing Spider-Man is an American comic book series about Spider-Man, published by Marvel Comics.

The Amazing Spider-Man may also refer to:

== Film and television ==
- The Amazing Spider-Man (TV series), 1977–79
  - Spider-Man (1977 film), a pilot for The Amazing Spider-Man
- The Amazing Spider-Man (film), 2012
  - The Amazing Spider-Man (soundtrack)

== Gaming ==
- The Amazing Spider-Man (1990 video game)
- The Amazing Spider-Man (2012 video game)
- The Amazing Spider-Man (handheld video game), 1990
- The Amazing Spider-Man (pinball)

== Other uses ==
- The Amazing Spider-Man (comic strip), a daily comic strip

== See also ==
- The Amazing Spider-Man 2 (disambiguation)
- Spider-Man (disambiguation)
- Peter Parker (The Amazing Spider-Man film series)
