= Spidey (disambiguation) =

Spidey colloquially refers to Spider-Man, a Marvel Comics superhero.

Spidey may also refer to:

- Spidey and His Amazing Friends
- Spidey Super Stories
- Spidey (comic book)
- Spidey Meets the President!

== See also ==
- Spider-Man (disambiguation)
