= List of best-selling PlayStation 5 video games =

This is a list of video games for the PlayStation 5 video game console that have sold or shipped at least one million copies.

== List ==
List of best-selling PlayStation 5 video games
Game	Copies sold	Release date (Note: Only the initial release date on this platform is listed.)	Genre(s)	Developer(s)	Publisher(s)
Grand Theft Auto VI	18.44 million (Note: The 18.44 million figure is a Sensor Tower estimate of PlayStation 5 copies sold, covering presales and purchases through launch day. Take-Two separately reported 32.5 million units sold pre-release across all platforms and $3.79 billion in day-one retail sales.)	November 19, 2026	Action-adventure	Rockstar Games	Rockstar Games
Marvel's Spider-Man 2	17.5 million	October 20, 2023	Action-adventure	Insomniac Games	Sony Interactive Entertainment
God of War Ragnarök	15.1 million (Note: Of the total 20.1 million copies sold by November 2026, 75.2% were for PS5.)	November 9, 2022	Action-adventure; hack and slash	Santa Monica Studio	Sony Interactive Entertainment
Elden Ring	12.54 million (Note: Of the total 36.4 million copies sold by October 2026, 35% were for PS5.)	February 25, 2022	Action role-playing	FromSoftware	Bandai Namco Entertainment: JP: FromSoftware
Gran Turismo 7	9.6 million (Note: Of the total 12.7 million copies sold by November 2026, 76.1% were for the PS5)	March 4, 2022	Sim racing	Polyphony Digital	Sony Interactive Entertainment
EA Sports FC 26	7.04 million (Note: Of the total 8 million, 88% is for the PS5)	September 26, 2025	Sports	EA Orlando	EA Sports
Resident Evil 4	6.968 million (Note: Of the total 13 million copies sold by February 2026, 53.6% were for PlayStation)	March 24, 2023	Survival horror	Capcom	Capcom
Black Myth: Wukong	6 million	August 20, 2024	Action role-playing	Game Science	Game Science
Helldivers 2	5.6 million	February 8, 2024	Third-person shooter	Arrowhead Game Studios	Sony Interactive Entertainment
Ghost of Yōtei	5.5 million	October 2, 2025	Action-adventure	Sucker Punch Productions	Sony Interactive Entertainment
Forza Horizon 5	5.3 million	April 29, 2025	Racing	Playground Games	Xbox Game Studios
Astro Bot	4.7 million	September 6, 2024	Platformer	Team Asobi	Sony Interactive Entertainment
Stellar Blade	3.7 million	April 26, 2024	Action-adventure	Shift Up	Sony Interactive Entertainment
Battlefield 6	3.2 million	October 10, 2025	First-person shooter	Battlefield Studios	Electronic Arts
Clair Obscur: Expedition 33	3.1 million (Note: 35.7% of the estimated 8.7 million copies sold as of October 2026 were on PS5)	April 24, 2025	Turn-based role-playing	Sandfall Interactive	Kepler Interactive
ARC Raiders	3.06 million (Note: Of the total 12 million copies sold by January, 25.5% of them were for PS5)	October 30, 2025	Third-person shooter	Embark Studios	Embark Studios
Final Fantasy XVI	3 million	June 22, 2023	Action role-playing	Square Enix Creative Business Unit III	Square Enix
Baldur's Gate 3	2.9 million (Note: 12.7% of the estimated 23.2 million copies sold as of October 2026 were on PS5)	September 6, 2023	Turn-based role-playing	Larian Studios	Larian Studios
Monster Hunter Wilds	2.9 million	February 28, 2025	Action role-playing	Capcom	Capcom
Resident Evil Requiem	2.8 million	February 27, 2026	Survival horror	Capcom	Capcom
Marvel's Wolverine	2.4 million	September 15, 2026	Action game	Insomniac Games	Sony Interactive Entertainment
Assassin's Creed Shadows	2.4 million	March 20, 2025	Action-adventure	Ubisoft Quebec	Ubisoft
Demon's Souls	1.857 million	November 12, 2020	Action role-playing	Bluepoint Games	Sony Interactive Entertainment
Sea of Thieves	1.8 million	April 30, 2024	Action-adventure	Rare	Xbox Game Studios
Dragon's Dogma 2	1.75 million	March 22, 2024	Action role-playing	Capcom	Capcom
Elden Ring Nightreign	1.4 million	May 30, 2025	Action role-playing; roguelike	FromSoftware	Bandai Namco Entertainment: JP: FromSoftware
Minecraft	1.4 million	October 22, 2024	Sandbox; survival	Mojang Studios	Mojang Studios
EA Sports FC 24	1.31 million (Note: EA Sports FC 24 sales breakdown: France – 1,168,610; Spain – 0.15 million (physical))	September 29, 2023	Sports	EA Canada; EA Bucharest	EA Sports
Death Stranding 2: On the Beach	1.3 million	June 26, 2025	Action-adventure	Kojima Productions	Sony Interactive Entertainment
The Elder Scrolls IV: Oblivion Remastered	1.1 million	April 22, 2025	Action role-playing	Virtuos; Bethesda Game Studios	Bethesda Softworks
Crimson Desert	1 million	March 19, 2026	Action-adventure	Pearl Abyss	Pearl Abyss
EA Sports College Football 26	1 million	July 10, 2025	Sports	EA Orlando	EA Sports
EA Sports FC 25	1 million (Note: EA Sports FC 25 sales breakdown: France – 985,262; Japan – 17,714 (physical))	September 27, 2024	Sports	EA Canada; EA Bucharest	EA Sports
Madden NFL 26	1 million	August 14, 2025	Sports	EA Orlando	EA Sports
