= The Amazing Spider-Man 2 (disambiguation) =

The Amazing Spider-Man 2 is a 2014 American film and a sequel to The Amazing Spider-Man.

The Amazing Spider-Man 2 may also refer to:

- The Amazing Spider-Man 2 (1992 video game), a 1992 video game
- The Amazing Spider-Man 2 (soundtrack), the soundtrack for the 2014 film, composed by Hans Zimmer
- The Amazing Spider-Man 2 (2014 video game), a 2014 game based on the 2014 film

== See also ==
- The Amazing Spider-Man (disambiguation)
- Spider-Man (disambiguation)
- Spider-Man 2 (disambiguation)
