= Marvel's Spider-Man 2 =

Spider-Man 2
- Developer: Insomniac Games (Note: Ported to Windows by Nixxes Software)
- Publisher: Sony Interactive Entertainment
- Directors: Bryan Intihar; Ryan Smith
- Artists: Jacinda Chew; Grant Hollis
- Writers: Jon Paquette; Walt Williams; Benjamin Arfmann
- Composer: John Paesano
- Series: Marvel's Spider-Man
- Platforms: PlayStation 5; Windows
- Release: PlayStation 5; October 20, 2023; Windows; January 30, 2025
- Genre: Action-adventure
- Mode: Single-player

Marvel's Spider-Man 2 is a 2023 action-adventure game developed by Insomniac Games and published by Sony Interactive Entertainment. It is based on the Marvel Comics character Spider-Man, and features a narrative inspired by its long-running comic book mythology which is also derived from various adaptations in other media. It is the third entry in the Marvel's Spider-Man series, acting as a sequel to Marvel's Spider-Man (2018) and a follow-up to Marvel's Spider-Man: Miles Morales (2020). The plot follows Peter Parker and Miles Morales as they come into conflict with Kraven the Hunter, who transforms New York City into a hunting ground for super-powered individuals; and the extraterrestrial Venom symbiote, which bonds itself to Peter and negatively influences him, threatening to destroy his personal relationships.

The gameplay builds on the foundation established by its predecessors, with an emphasis on the multiple play styles offered by Peter Parker and Miles Morales as Spider-Men. The game expands on their existing traversal and combat abilities, including new web-based gadgets and suits that can be unlocked through progressing in the story. It also introduces the former Spider-Man's symbiote suit, granting Parker unique abilities from his previous playable appearance. As with the prior games, content outside the main story consists of completing side-missions and obtaining collectibles dispersed throughout the game's open world, with the player able to switch between Parker and Morales to complete dedicated objectives for each of them and each with their own unique abilities.

Discussions regarding a proper sequel to Marvel's Spider-Man began during the game's development, with open story threads for future titles being teased across both it and Miles Morales. The game was announced in September 2021. Creative director Bryan Intihar, game director Ryan Smith, narrative lead Jon Paquette and art director Jacinda Chew from Insomniac Games respectively reprise their duties from prior entries, while Yuri Lowenthal, Nadji Jeter and Laura Bailey return to headline the game's voice cast, which comprises other returning actors and characters from the previous games. Jim Pirri and Tony Todd join the cast as the voices of Kraven and Venom, respectively.

Marvel's Spider-Man 2 was released for the PlayStation 5 on October 20, 2023, and was ported to Windows by Nixxes Software on January 30, 2025. The game received critical acclaim, with praise directed towards its narrative, characterization, and gameplay, although its third act and writing received some criticism. It was nominated for numerous end-of-year accolades, and won in six categories at the 27th Annual D.I.C.E. Awards, including Action Game of the Year. The game was also included in many lists of the best games of 2023. The game sold over 2.5 million units in 24 hours and over five million in 11 days, becoming the best selling game on the console in addition to PlayStation's fastest selling first-party title. The game has sold over 11 million units as of April 20, 2024.

== Gameplay ==
After the mission Good Men, Spider-Man is bonded to the Venom symbiote for about 15-16 main missions, granting him tendrils that he can use in combat and unique web-based abilities.

Marvel's Spider-Man 2 is an action-adventure single-player video game played from a third-person perspective. As with the first game Peter Parker and Miles Morales are the two main characters, with Mary Jane and Venom playable in certain missions, becoming individually playable in accordance with the story as they traverse an open world New York City and fight enemies. Players can acquire new abilities and collect various Spider-Man suits. Peter and Miles can be freely swapped between at any point during free-roam in the game's open world, and have dedicated missions both in the main story and as part of side content that takes advantage of their individual traits. The game expands upon the prior entries' open world, allowing players to explore Brooklyn and Queens in addition to Manhattan, which was the main setting of the previous two games.

Building on the combat system of the previous titles, both Spider-Men are able to parry physical attacks, as certain enemy types are impervious to dodging. During traversal, both Peter and Miles' new suits come equipped with Web Wings, which, when deployed, allow them to glide across the city, with their speed and distance covered increasing when taking advantage of areas such as wind tunnels. Each Spider-Man's gadget wheel has been upgraded with additional equippable mods for their web-shooters, such as being able to cast a Web Line across pillars for additional footing during stealth sequences suspended above enemies, and the Web Grabber, allowing multiple enemies to be pulled into an isolated spot for Stealth Takedowns, which can be performed on two enemies at once. In addition to Peter Parker's standard gameplay, he is playable when bonded to the Venom symbiote, granting him tendrils that he can use in combat and unique web-based abilities. Both Spider-Men have individual Skill Trees with additional unlockable abilities for both of them once they accumulate enough Skill Points in accordance with their experience level, as well as a third Skill Tree dedicated to shared abilities between them.

== Synopsis ==
=== Characters and setting ===
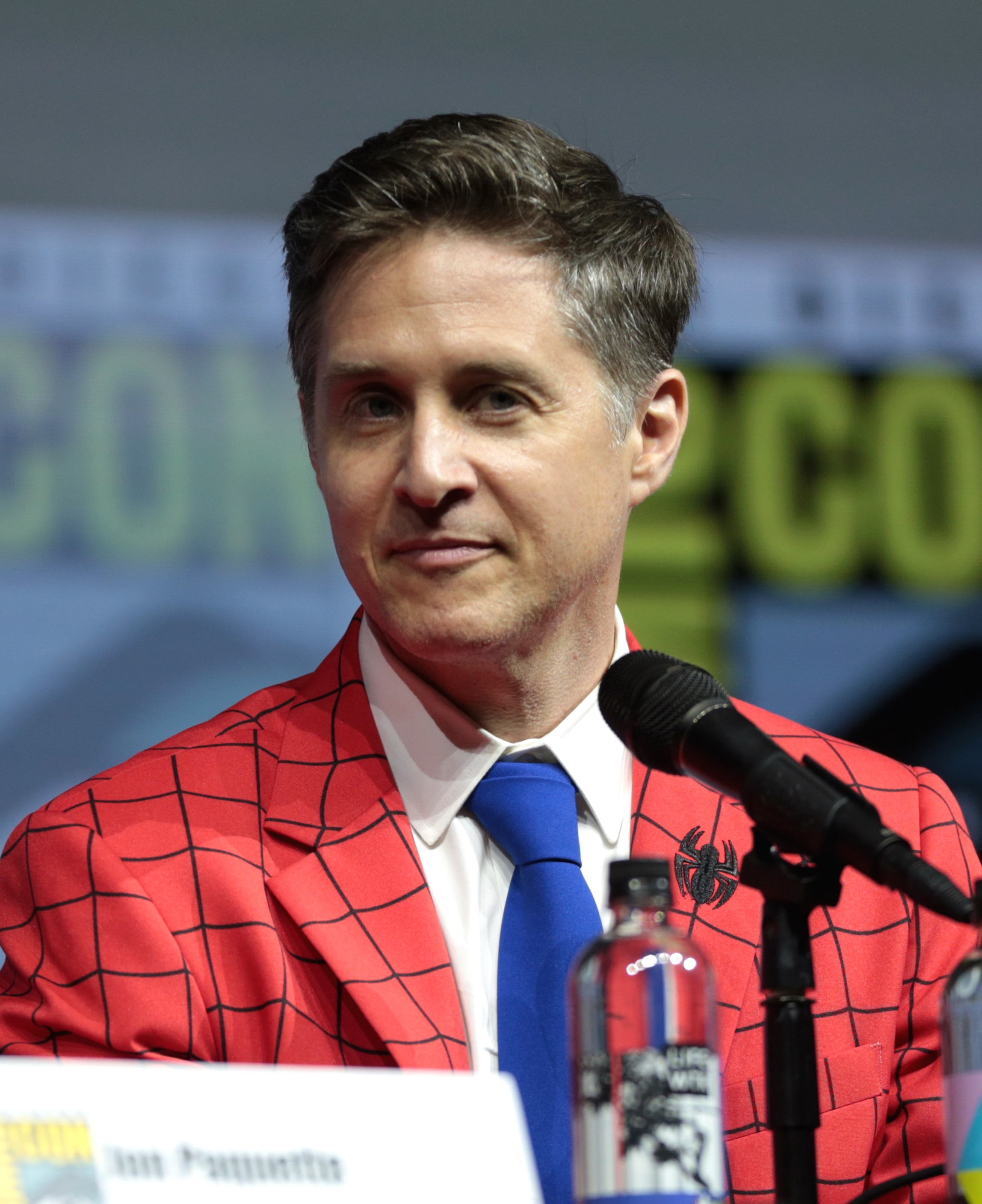
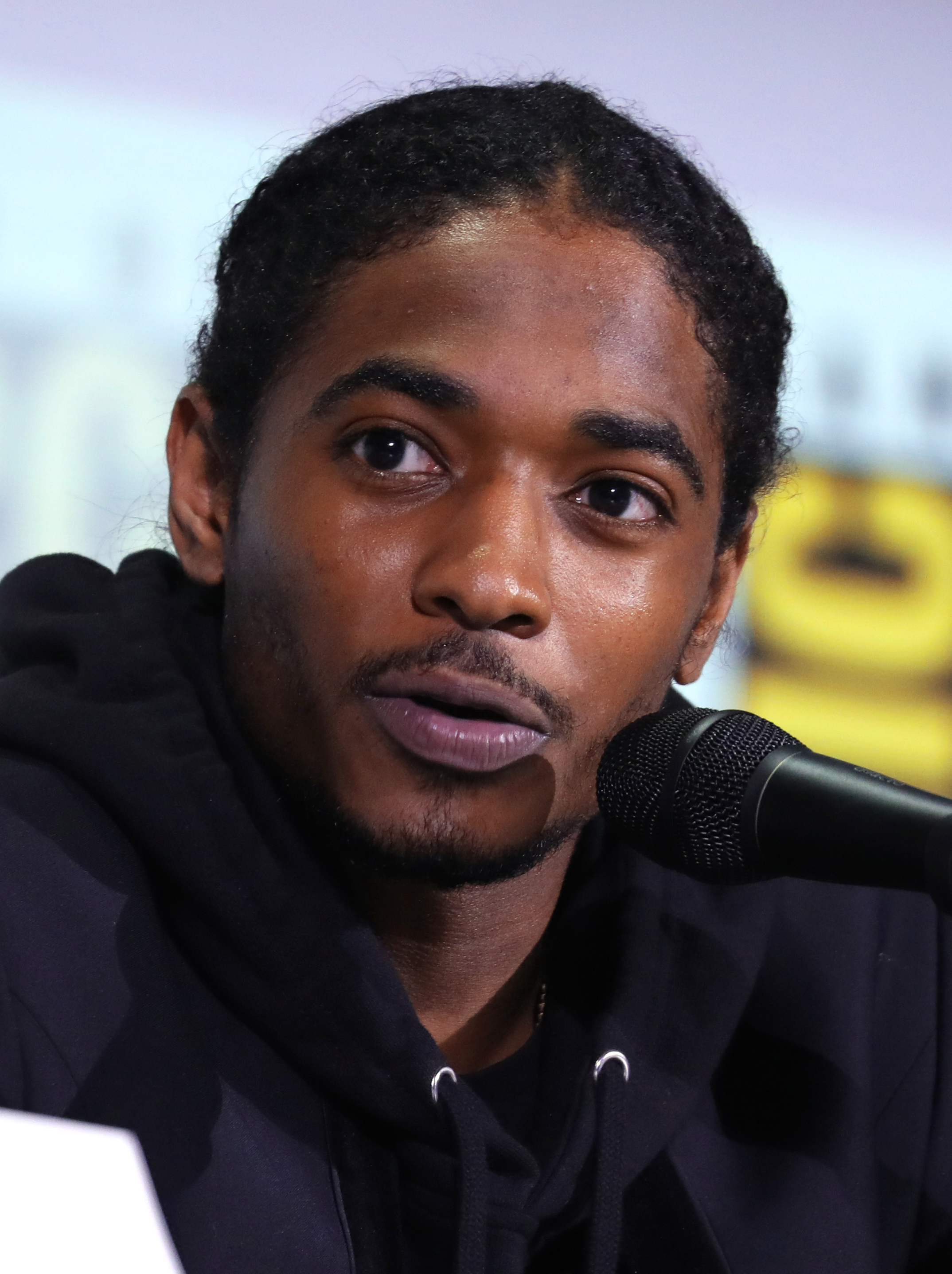
Yuri Lowenthal in 2018 (left) and Nadji Jeter in 2023. They voiced the game's two main protagonists, Peter Parker and Miles Morales, respectively.

Marvel's Spider-Man 2 is set 10 months after the events of Spider-Man: Miles Morales (2020). As with previous installments in the series, it features a large ensemble cast of various characters derived from the history of Spider-Man comics and other media. The game follows Peter Parker (Yuri Lowenthal) and Miles Morales (Nadji Jeter), who both became the superhero Spider-Man after gaining superhuman abilities upon being bitten by genetically modified spiders. Peter serves as a mentor to Miles, who gained his superpowers during the events of the first game, though he struggles with balancing his personal life and duties as the city's protector. They are supported by several allies: Daily Bugle reporter and Peter's girlfriend Mary Jane Watson (Laura Bailey); Miles' classmate and tech guru Ganke Lee (Griffin Puatu); city councilwoman and Miles' mother Rio (Jacqueline Piñol); deaf street artist Hailey Cooper (Natasha Ofili); and Miles' estranged uncle Aaron Davis (Ike Amadi), who previously operated as the Prowler.

Other characters in the game include former New York mayor and Oscorp CEO Norman Osborn (Mark Rolston) and his son, Peter and Mary Jane's best friend Harry Osborn (Graham Phillips), who suffers from a neurological disease inherited from his mother, Emily; Yuri Watanabe (Tara Platt), a disgraced former police captain and ally of Peter who has assumed the vigilante identity of "Wraith" following the events of The City That Never Sleeps; J. Jonah Jameson (Darin De Paul), the Daily Bugle's chief editor and Mary Jane's boss; Danika Hart (Ashly Burch), host of the "Danikast" podcast; Peter's deceased aunt, May (Nancy Linari), who is featured in a flashback; and Miles' late father, Officer Jefferson Davis (Russell Richardson), who appears in a dream sequence.

Throughout the city, the two Spider-Men are faced with several supervillains such as Venom (Tony Todd), an extraterrestrial symbiote capable of bonding to human bodies and granting regenerative powers while negatively influencing their behavior; Sergei Kravinoff / Kraven the Hunter (Jim Pirri), the leader of a faction of mercenaries called the "Hunters" who seek to hunt super-powered beings; and Cletus Kasady (Chad Doreck), also known as "The Flame", the head of a nihilistic cult who seeks to perform a demonic ritual to bring about an eschatological event dubbed the "Crimson Hour". Returning villains from the first game include Martin Li / Mister Negative (Stephen Oyoung), Mac Gargan / Scorpion (Jason Spisak), Lonnie Lincoln / Tombstone (Corey Jones), and Felicia Hardy / Black Cat (Erica Lindbeck). Additional antagonists who were referenced in prior entries make full appearances in Spider-Man 2, including Flint Marko / Sandman (Leandro Cano), a lowly burglar who, through an accident, gained the ability to turn into molecules of sand and manipulate them at will; Curt Connors / Lizard (Mark Whitten), an Oscorp scientist who transformed into a giant reptilian creature; Dmitri Smerdyakov / Chameleon (Jim Pirri), a criminal master of disguises and Kraven's half-brother; and Quentin Beck / Mysterio (Noshir Dalal), a visual effects artist and reformed criminal who became the head developer of a virtual reality entertainment attraction called "Mysterium". Furthermore, Otto Octavius / Doctor Octopus (William Salyers), who is incarcerated in the Raft after the events of the first game, appears in a mid-credits scene.

The character Cindy Moon makes a non-speaking cameo appearance in the game's post-credits scene, along with her father Albert Moon (Tom Choi). The character Delilah, a skilled assassin who serves as the bartender at the Bar with No Name in an alternate universe, makes a cameo appearance during "The Message" side-quest. This version of the character was originally intended to appear in Spider-Man: Across the Spider-Verse (2023) before her scene was cut from the final film.

=== Plot ===
10 months after the events of Marvel's Spider-Man: Miles Morales, Peter Parker starts his first day as a physics teacher at Brooklyn Visions Academy with Miles Morales among his students, but they are interrupted by a rampaging Sandman, requiring both Spider-Men to subdue him. Fired for abandoning his class, Peter returns to his Aunt May's home in Queens (which he has moved into following her death) (Note: As depicted in Marvel's Spider-Man (2018)) to meet with Mary Jane. They are surprised by their friend Harry Osborn, who has seemingly made a full recovery from a terminal illness. Harry invites Peter to work at his environmental technology startup, the Emily-May Foundation, (Note: Named after Aunt May Parker and Harry's mother Emily Osborn) so they can pursue Harry's dream of "healing the world". Concurrently, Kraven arrives in New York with his army of Hunters.

While overseeing a prison transfer with Peter at the Raft, a vengeful Miles fails to stop the Hunters from capturing Martin Li, who is responsible for the death of Miles' father Jefferson Davis. (Note: As depicted in Marvel's Spider-Man (2018)) Investigating Kraven, Peter discovers he is hunting super-powered individuals in search of an "equal". Having already killed Scorpion, Vulture, Shocker, and Electro, Kraven attempts to capture Black Cat; however, Miles helps her escape to Paris by using the mystical Wand of Watoomb.

Peter, Mary Jane, and Harry visit Coney Island to reconnect. While there, the Hunters attack the park to capture a reformed Tombstone; as Peter rescues civilians, he is assisted by a super-powered Harry, who in turn learns Peter is Spider-Man. Harry reveals that, on his father's insistence, he was cured by Curt Connors via a powerful organic exosuit that physically augments his body. With the exosuit's powers rapidly developing, Harry helps Peter rescue Tombstone from the Hunters, while Mary Jane discovers that Kraven has also kidnapped Connors. The trio attempt to save Connors, but Kraven forcibly transforms him into the Lizard, steals a vial of the Lizard serum, and mortally wounds Peter. Moments before Peter's death, the exosuit transfers itself from Harry to Peter's body, saving his life. After Peter viciously defeats the Hunters with his newly enhanced powers, Kraven develops an interest in hunting Peter personally.

Peter reunites with Harry and Mary Jane and attempts to return the suit to Harry, but it refuses to leave him; the three conclude that they need Connors' help. Peter discovers that Kraven is terminally ill with cancer, and that he is searching for a worthy individual who can provide him with a "warrior's death" in combat, allowing him to die on his own terms. Peter manages to retrieve the serum from Kraven, who discovers the exo-suit's weakness to loud noises. While trying to synthesize an antidote at the Emily-May Foundation, Peter and Harry are attacked by the Hunters via a tracker Kraven left on the serum vial. Though they manage to successfully create the antidote, the ensuing battle destroys the Foundation, devastating Harry. Peter tracks down Connors with Miles' help, and eventually subdues and cures him. Upon seeing Peter wearing the exo-suit, Connors reveals that it is actually an alien lifeform called a symbiote, which he was responsible for procuring with help from Oscorp. The incident also cost Connors his arm when the symbiote latched on and refused to let go. Connors advises Peter to destroy it; but he refuses under the symbiote's corrupting influence, despite learning that Harry's illness has returned, which strains their friendship. As Peter goes on a symbiote-induced rampage against the Hunters (almost killing Mary Jane at one point), Kraven captures Miles and forces him to fight Li. Miles overcomes his anger towards the latter and helps him escape, telling him to find Peter. Once Li informs him of Miles' location, Peter storms Kraven's fortress to rescue him, nearly killing Kraven before Miles intervenes. Miles then fights Peter, helping him overcome the symbiote's corruption and removing it from his body.

Free of the symbiote, Peter takes it to Oscorp to be destroyed, but a desperate Harry reclaims it, transforming into a monstrous creature. After slaughtering Oscorp staff trying to remove the symbiote from him, the symbiote-possessed Harry escapes into Times Square, where he defeats several of Kraven's Hunters before overpowering and killing Kraven himself, to the latter's satisfaction. The symbiote convinces Harry to "heal the world" by infecting everyone on Earth with symbiotes, starting with New York. Now calling themselves Venom, Harry infects Mary Jane with her own symbiote, turning her into Scream, but Peter helps her break free of its influence, reconciling with her.

As Peter and Miles attempt to stop Venom, Peter is hindered by a trace amount of the symbiote still within him. After Miles settles his differences with Li, the latter uses his powers to convert Peter's symbiote traces into the Anti-Venom symbiote, which can destroy other symbiotes. Concurrently, Venom recovers the meteorite that originally brought him to Earth and empowers himself with it, accelerating his infestation of New York. Peter and Miles distract Venom, while Mary Jane steals the meteorite and destroys it with the EMF's particle accelerator, destroying Venom's symbiote horde. At Harry's insistence, Peter destroys the symbiote and frees Harry from its control, but the strain on his body renders Harry comatose.

In the aftermath, Mary Jane has quit the Daily Bugle to run her own podcast and moves in with Peter, who opts to take a break from being Spider-Man to focus on rebuilding the EMF, trusting Miles to protect the city on his own. Meanwhile, Norman blames the Spider-Men for ruining Harry's recovery; he visits an imprisoned Otto Octavius at the Raft to demand their secret identities, but Octavius refuses, taking glee in Norman's suffering while also planning revenge against Spider-Men. Miles completes his college essay and meets Rio's new boyfriend, Albert Moon, who introduces them to his daughter Cindy.

== Development ==
Both the first game and its spin-off title Marvel's Spider-Man: Miles Morales (2020) included implicit teases toward future titles, including post-credits scenes alluding to Insomniac Games' intentions to introduce Venom into their narrative, as well as feature Norman Osborn and his son Harry in more prominent roles. Intihar stated that Insomniac Games had discussed including the Black Suit as an unlockable costume during the development of the first game, but a meeting with Insomniac art director Gavin Goulden, Marvel Games vice president Bill Rosemann and senior director Eric Monacelli, convinced them that the symbiote would have to play a more significant role in their Spider-Man story to justify its inclusion. When unveiling Miles Morales at Sony's PlayStation 5 reveal event in June 2020, Insomniac stated that a standalone title featuring Miles as the protagonist would not detract from the fact they had "much of Peter's story left to tell" in future games.

Marvel's Spider-Man 2 and sister title Marvel's Wolverine were jointly announced by Insomniac Games at the PlayStation Showcase event in September 2021. Bryan Intihar and Ryan Smith serve as the game's creative and game directors, respectively reprising their roles from Marvel's Spider-Man, while Yuri Lowenthal, Nadji Jeter, and Tony Todd star as Peter Parker, Miles Morales, and Venom, respectively. Speaking on the This Week in Marvel podcast, Bill Rosemann described the game's narrative as "a little darker", as well as "the next big chapter". He likened the story's tone to The Empire Strikes Back (1980), contrasted with how Marvel's Spider-Man's narrative felt tonally similar to the original Star Wars (1977).

In January 2022, Brittney Morris, who previously wrote the Miles Morales tie-in novel Wings of Fury, joined the writing team on the game; and in June freelance artist Davison Carvalho was hired to serve as the game's art director. Carvalho had also served as a concept artist for various Marvel Cinematic Universe (MCU) films. That November, actor Scott Porter, who voiced Harry Osborn throughout the Research Station activities in the first game, revealed that he was recast in Marvel's Spider-Man 2 to accommodate the character's more prominent role in the story, addressing potential issues such as the age gap between himself and the character as "they decided to go photorealistic". Actor Graham Phillips was later announced to take over the role of Osborn from Porter during San Diego Comic-Con in July 2023.

Lowenthal discussed his portrayal of Peter Parker as he is under the influence of the Venom symbiote, citing "behaviors of addiction" as a major inspiration on how he would differentiate his two vocal performances at different points in the game. He additionally likened his delivery as Symbiote Spider-Man to his time voicing the character Sasuke Uchiha in the anime series Naruto, which was a stark contrast in tone to the "plucky young heroes" he was used to playing due to Sasuke's comparatively downbeat personality, and having to "dig a little bit" to emulate the character's angst. The game would not depict Eddie Brock as the symbiote's host, a deviation from the majority of Spider-Man media featuring the character. Intihar cited a desire to tell an original story that stood apart from both the comics and various films featuring Venom while respecting the roots of the character. Intihar asserted that they never intend to interpret a character so differently from other appearances at the risk of alienating fans, but they did want to provide a unique take on the material that felt tied to their franchise, citing the creative liberties taken with Peter Parker's Advanced Suit in the first game as an example, and how despite the adherence to classic elements like the red and blue color scheme, the enlarged, white spider emblem on the suit's chest distinguished the character as Insomniac's version of Spider-Man among other adaptations. The game had gone gold in late September, one month before release.

== Marketing ==
The game's gameplay reveal debuted during Sony Interactive Entertainment's PlayStation Showcase event in May 2023, highlighting a mission within the game's main story campaign that showed Peter Parker adorning the symbiote suit, and Miles Morales / Spider-Man, as the pair intercepted an attempt by Kraven's Hunters to capture Dr. Curt Connors as his transformation into the Lizard resulted in him breaking into a fish market near the New York City docks. As part of the game's promotion, a separate splice of gameplay was featured in a scene from the film Spider-Man: Across the Spider-Verse (2023), which depicted Miles Morales' roommate Ganke Lee playing the game on his PlayStation 5 console at their dorm. The sequence showed Peter Parker / Spider-Man initiating a takedown on a common thug using the spider-leg appendages equipped at the back of his new Advanced Suit. Concept art of the Spider-Men combatting both Kraven the Hunter and Venom was presented at Summer Game Fest 2023, where creative director Bryan Intihar appeared as a guest to discuss the game's story and unveil the game's launch date and box art. The game's main theme, "Greater Together" composed by John Paesano, was previewed at The Game Awards 10-Year Concert in June 2023, and was released on music streaming services shortly thereafter. Intihar, along with producer Bill Rosemann from Marvel Games, Lowenthal, Jeter, Bailey and Todd, presented a Hall H panel at San Diego Comic-Con in July 2023, titled "Symbiotic Relationships". The panel divulged further story and character details and was accompanied by the debut of a story trailer, and the unveiling of commemorative PlayStation 5 console bundles and accessories to coincide with the game's launch. A gameplay overview narrated by creative director Bryan Intihar was featured as part of the PlayStation State of Play presentation in September 2023, in conjunction with preview events being held for media journalists in Los Angeles, where more extensive demos and playable builds of the game were showcased. The game's launch trailer was released online on October 15, 2023, during New York Comic Con.

=== Tie-in media and merchandise ===
A tie-in prequel comic was released by Marvel Comics on Free Comic Book Day in May 2023, written by Marvel's Spider-Man writer Christos Gage and illustrated by Ig Guara. Taking place after the events of Miles Morales, the narrative features Peter Parker, Miles Morales and Mary Jane Watson struggling to balance their individual responsibilities and the former's respective duties to New York as Spider-Men, and features The Hood as its main antagonist, who is attempting to procure an allegedly ancient tablet inscribed with magic tomes to resuscitate his dying mother. The game's narrative director and Marvel's Spider-Man co-writer Jon Paquette elaborated on the writing team's interest in introducing The Hood for the comic, stating that they were interested in exploring the idea of the two Spider-Men having to confront a threat with powers beyond their understanding.

== Release ==
Marvel's Spider-Man 2 was released for the PlayStation 5 on October 20, 2023. A New Game Plus mode was released on March 7, 2024. A Windows port of the game, developed by Nixxes Software, was released on January 30, 2025.

Alongside the standard edition, a Digital Deluxe Edition was made available for the game. This edition features two sets of five unique suits for Peter Parker and Miles Morales, designed by guest artists from PlayStation Studios and the wider entertainment industry. It includes additional frames, stickers for the in-game Photo Mode, and two extra skill points for ability unlocks. A Collector's Edition will be distributed through participating retailers and PlayStation Direct. It contains a download voucher for the Digital Deluxe Edition, a steel bookcase, and a 19-inch display statue depicting the Spider-Men fighting Venom. All pre-orders, regardless of edition, come with early unlock bonuses: the "Arachknight Suit" for Peter Parker and "Shadow-Spider Suit" for Miles Morales, the Web Grabber gadget, and three additional skill points. The game has its LGBT content censored in order to be sold to Middle Eastern countries.

To commemorate the game's launch, Sony Interactive Entertainment distributed a special edition PlayStation 5 console bundle themed after the game on September 1, 2023. It is a variant of the standard PlayStation 5 sporting custom face plates and a unique DualSense controller design based on the imagery of the Venom symbiote wrapping itself around a red gradient adorning Peter Parker's Spider-Man emblem. Insomniac Games art director Jacinda Chew remarked on this design being evocative of the various ways players experience the symbiote taking over Peter in the game's story, describing it as a "constant push and pull for dominance whether it's internal or external and the outcome is not certain." The console comes with a digital voucher for the game's Standard Edition for pre-load ahead of launch. The face plates and special DualSense controller are sold as separate accessories for existing owners of both the disc-based and Digital Edition PS5 consoles.

A free update in August 2026 added the suits from Spider-Man: Brand New Day and Marvel Tōkon: Fighting Souls to the game.

== Reception ==
=== Critical reception ===
Reception

Aggregate scores
Aggregator	Score
Metacritic	PS5: 90/100 (Note: Based on 151 reviews, 143 (95%) of which are "positive", 1 (1%) is "mixed", and the remaining are unscored); PC: 76/100
OpenCritic	91% recommend (Note: Based on 166 reviews)

Review scores
Publication	Score
Destructoid	9/10
Digital Trends	4.5/5
Easy Allies	9/10
Eurogamer	4/5
Famitsu	38/40
Game Informer	9.5/10
GameSpot	8/10
GamesRadar+	5/5
Hardcore Gamer	4.5/5
IGN	8/10
PCMag	4/5
Push Square	8/10
Shacknews	10/10
The Guardian	5/5
Video Games Chronicle	5/5
VG247	5/5
VideoGamer.com	10/10

Marvel's Spider-Man 2 received "universal acclaim" from critics, according to review aggregator website Metacritic, with 97% of critics recommending the game on aggregator OpenCritic.

Significant praise was directed towards the narrative and characterization of the primary cast. Gene Park, writing for The Washington Post, applauded the development and increasing tension between Peter Parker and Miles Morales, as well as the former's friendship with Harry Osborn, noting that it was pushed as far as possible in a fashion that was "satisfying to watch". Matt Miller from Game Informer highlighted the story's effectiveness at deriving from philosophical concepts associated with heroism against villainy, recognizing the game's ability to pull from "questions about returning from a dark place and having another chance, no matter past mistakes". Miller also praised the game's effectiveness as an installment in a larger trilogy of games, able to stand alone but "made better by experiencing its entirety".

In their 10/10 review of the game, Inverse's Hayes Madsen directed praise towards the developer's seamless blend of ongoing narrative with the game mechanics, exemplifying the use of flashback sequences to teach the player about fundamental mechanics such as stealth and puzzle-solving, as well as the game's variation between quieter character-building, the minigames, and hallmark set-pieces during action sequences.

=== Sales ===
Marvel's Spider-Man 2 sold over 2.5 million units in the first 24 hours of release, making it the fastest-selling PlayStation Studios game using the first 24 hours as the metric, and over five million units within 11 days. In the United Kingdom, it was the best-selling retail game during its week of release, becoming the fourth-biggest physical launch of the year. It was also the fourth best-selling video game in the US in 2023. As of February 4, 2024, the game has sold ten million units. As of April 20, 2024, the game sold over 11 million units.

=== Accolades ===
Marvel's Spider-Man 2 was featured in many lists of the best games of 2023. Both Push Square and Eurogamer picked it as their 2023 Game of the Year. Time, Game Informer and The Guardian placed the game third on their lists of the best games of 2023. Both GamesRadar+ and Empire placed the game fourth on their lists of the best games of 2023. Both The Ringer and Forbes placed it fifth on their lists. The Escapist also put it among the best PS5 games and the best Action-Adventure games of 2023. The game won as IGN's Game of the Year (by readers' choice) and as PS5 Game of the Year (including other accolades) at the PlayStation Blog Awards.

The game received multiple nominations (including Game of the Year) at the Golden Joystick Awards, The Game Awards 2023 and the 24th Game Developers Choice Awards, ultimately winning six major awards (including Action Game of the Year) at the 27th Annual D.I.C.E. Awards.

At the 20th British Academy Games Awards the game was nominated in several categories (including Best Game) and won in the category "Perfomer in a Leading Role" (Nadji Jeter). At the NAVGTR Awards the game won in seven categories, including "Best Game, Franchise Action" and "Best Performance in a Drama, Lead" (Yuri Lowenthal).

Across the years following its release, the game was included in many lists of the best PS5 games ever made.

Date	Award	Category	Recipient(s)	Result	Ref.
2023	Golden Joystick Awards	Ultimate Game of the Year	Marvel's Spider-Man 2	Nominated (Note: Voted #3 out of twenty nominees for Ultimate Game of the Year)	
2023	Golden Joystick Awards	Best Lead Performer	Nadji Jeter	Nominated	
2023	Golden Joystick Awards	Best Lead Performer	Yuri Lowenthal	Nominated	
2023	Golden Joystick Awards	Best Supporting Performer	Laura Bailey	Nominated	
2023	14th Hollywood Music in Media Awards	Best Original Song in a Video Game ("Swing")	Dernst "D'Mile" Emile II, Eian Parker, Ian Welch, Olu Fann, Benji, and EarthGang	Won	
2023	14th Hollywood Music in Media Awards	Music Supervision – Video Game	Alex Hackford, Scott Hanau, and Keith Leary	Nominated	
2023	14th Hollywood Music in Media Awards	Music Design – Trailer	John Paesano	Nominated	
2023	The Game Awards 2023	Game of the Year	Marvel's Spider-Man 2	Nominated	
2023	The Game Awards 2023	Best Game Direction	Marvel's Spider-Man 2	Nominated	
2023	The Game Awards 2023	Best Narrative	Marvel's Spider-Man 2	Nominated	
2023	The Game Awards 2023	Best Audio Design	Marvel's Spider-Man 2	Nominated	
2023	The Game Awards 2023	Best Performance	Yuri Lowenthal	Nominated	
2023	The Game Awards 2023	Innovation in Accessibility	Marvel's Spider-Man 2	Nominated	
2023	The Game Awards 2023	Best Action-Adventure Game	Marvel's Spider-Man 2	Nominated	
2023	The Game Awards 2023	Player's Voice	Marvel's Spider-Man 2	Nominated	
2024	New York Game Awards	Big Apple Award for Game of the Year	Marvel's Spider-Man 2	Nominated	
2024	New York Game Awards	Statue of Liberty Award for Best World	Marvel's Spider-Man 2	Nominated	
2024	27th Annual D.I.C.E. Awards	Game of the Year	Bryan Intihar, Ryan Smith, and Jeannette Lee	Nominated	
2024	27th Annual D.I.C.E. Awards	Action Game of the Year	Bryan Intihar, Ryan Smith, and Jeannette Lee	Won	
2024	27th Annual D.I.C.E. Awards	Outstanding Achievement in Game Direction	Bryan Intihar and Ryan Smith	Nominated	
2024	27th Annual D.I.C.E. Awards	Outstanding Achievement in Animation	Bobby Coddington and Danny Garnett	Won	
2024	27th Annual D.I.C.E. Awards	Outstanding Achievement in Art Direction	Jacinda Chew, Davison Carvalho, and Johnson Truong	Nominated	
2024	27th Annual D.I.C.E. Awards	Outstanding Achievement in Audio Design	Paul Mudra, Jerry Berlongieri, and Dwight Okahara	Won	
2024	27th Annual D.I.C.E. Awards	Outstanding Achievement in Character	Miles Morales – Nadji Jeter, Jon Paquette, Ben Arfmann, and Lauren Mee	Won	
2024	27th Annual D.I.C.E. Awards	Outstanding Achievement in Original Music Composition	John Paesano, Scott Hanau, Keith Leary, and Rob Goodson	Won	
2024	27th Annual D.I.C.E. Awards	Outstanding Technical Achievement	Doug Sheahan, Mike Fitzgerald, and Jess Scott	Won	
2024	51st Annie Awards	Outstanding Achievement for Character Animation in a Video Game	Insomniac Games Animation Team	Won	
2024	22nd Visual Effects Society Awards	Outstanding Visual Effects in a Real-Time Project	Jacinda Chew, Jeannette Lee, Bryanna Lindsey, Alan Weider	Nominated	
2024	24th Game Developers Choice Awards	Game of the Year	Marvel's Spider-Man 2	Nominated	
2024	24th Game Developers Choice Awards	Best Audio	Marvel's Spider-Man 2	Nominated	
2024	24th Game Developers Choice Awards	Best Design	Marvel's Spider-Man 2	Honorable mention	
2024	24th Game Developers Choice Awards	Innovation Award	Marvel's Spider-Man 2	Honorable mention	
2024	24th Game Developers Choice Awards	Best Narrative	Marvel's Spider-Man 2	Nominated	
2024	24th Game Developers Choice Awards	Social Impact Award	Marvel's Spider-Man 2	Honorable mention	
2024	24th Game Developers Choice Awards	Best Technology	Marvel's Spider-Man 2	Nominated	
2024	24th Game Developers Choice Awards	Audience Award	Marvel's Spider-Man 2	Nominated	
2024	20th British Academy Games Awards	Best Game	Marvel's Spider-Man 2	Nominated	
2024	20th British Academy Games Awards	Animation	Marvel's Spider-Man 2	Nominated	
2024	20th British Academy Games Awards	Audio Achievement	Marvel's Spider-Man 2	Nominated	
2024	20th British Academy Games Awards	Game Design	Marvel's Spider-Man 2	Nominated	
2024	20th British Academy Games Awards	Music	Marvel's Spider-Man 2	Nominated	
2024	20th British Academy Games Awards	Performer in a Leading Role	Nadji Jeter as Miles Morales	Won	
2024	20th British Academy Games Awards	Performer in a Leading Role	Yuri Lowenthal as Peter Parker	Nominated	
2024	20th British Academy Games Awards	Performer in a Supporting Role	Tony Todd as Venom	Nominated	
2024	20th British Academy Games Awards	Technical Achievement	Marvel's Spider-Man 2	Nominated	
2024	20th British Academy Games Awards	EE Game of the Year	Marvel's Spider-Man 2	Nominated	
2024	20th British Academy Games Awards	Artistic Achievement	Marvel's Spider-Man 2	Longlisted	
2024	Golden Reel Awards 2023	Outstanding Achievement in Sound Editing - Game Effects/Foley	Marvel's Spider-Man 2	Won	
2024	Golden Reel Awards 2023	Outstanding Achievement in Sound Editing - Game Dialogue/ADR	Marvel's Spider-Man 2	Nominated	
2024	Golden Reel Awards 2023	Outstanding Achievement in Music Editing - Game Music	Marvel's Spider-Man 2	Nominated	
2025	67th Annual Grammy Awards	Best Score Soundtrack for Video Games and Other Interactive Media	John Paesano	Nominated	
2025	Game Audio Network Guild Awards	Audio of the Year	Marvel's Spider-Man 2	Nominated	
2025	Game Audio Network Guild Awards	Best Audio Mix	Marvel's Spider-Man 2	Nominated	
2025	Game Audio Network Guild Awards	Best Cinematic & Cutscene Audio	Marvel's Spider-Man 2	Won	
2025	Game Audio Network Guild Awards	Best Ensemble Cast Performance	Marvel's Spider-Man 2	Won	
2025	Game Audio Network Guild Awards	Best Game Foley	Marvel's Spider-Man 2	Won	
2025	Game Audio Network Guild Awards	Best Game Trailer Audio	Marvel's Spider-Man 2	Nominated	
2025	Game Audio Network Guild Awards	Best Voice Performance	Jim Pirri as Kraven the Hunter	Nominated	
2025	Game Audio Network Guild Awards	Best Voice Performance	Nadji Jeter as Miles Morales	Nominated	
2025	Game Audio Network Guild Awards	Best Voice Performance	Tony Todd as Venom	Nominated	
2025	Game Audio Network Guild Awards	Dialogue of the Year	Marvel's Spider-Man 2	Won	
2025	Game Audio Network Guild Awards	Creative and Technical Achievement in Sound Design	Marvel's Spider-Man 2	Nominated	
2025	Game Audio Network Guild Awards	Sound Design of the Year	Marvel's Spider-Man 2	Nominated	
2026	2025 Steam Awards	Best Soundtrack	Marvel's Spider-Man 2	Nominated	

== Future ==
In September 2023, shortly before Marvel's Spider-Man 2's release, narrative director Ben Arfmann addressed the possibility of future games. In October 2023, senior narrative director Jon Paquette and Insomniac discussed the possibility of a spin-off game involving Venom. The same month, senior creative director Bryan Intihar said that a potential third installment would be "pretty epic", comparing the stories of Spider-Man and Spider-Man: Miles Morales to the Marvel Cinematic Universe film Iron Man (2008) and the story of Spider-Man 2 to Captain America: Civil War (2016). Intihar was questioned in the same interview regarding the potential to closely connect the studio's Spider-Man titles with the upcoming game Marvel's Wolverine, which he confirmed was set in the same shared universe. Intihar stated he preferred that the Wolverine team remained committed to making the game stand on its own, but did not rule out crossing over the characters in the future as they had discussed earlier in development. Intihar was also asked about various easter eggs referencing Daredevil, namely the appearance of Matt Murdock and Foggy Nelson's law offices having been debranded and vacated after the events of the prior games, answering, "That's a good question. Stay tuned. Good find though." In November, Arfmann and Morris confirmed that Morales would be considered the main Spider-Man in further entries of the franchise. A multiplayer game entitled Spider-Man: The Great Web was planned and canceled as well.

In December 2023, Insomniac Games was targeted in a ransomware attack by the cybercrime group Rhysida, who published 1.6 terabytes (TB) of sensitive information concerning employee data, development assets and pre-production slates internally used at the studio. While the hack primarily concerned production materials related to the upcoming game Marvel's Wolverine, various documents and studio roadmaps published online through the hack, alluded to the existence of multiple Marvel video games in development at the studio, including a standalone Venom game and Marvel's Spider-Man 3, which was expected to be narratively set up by the Venom game.

On February 24, 2025, Lowenthal confirmed that Peter will appear in an upcoming sequel to Marvel's Spider-Man 2.
