= PlayStation 5 =

Home video game console by Sony

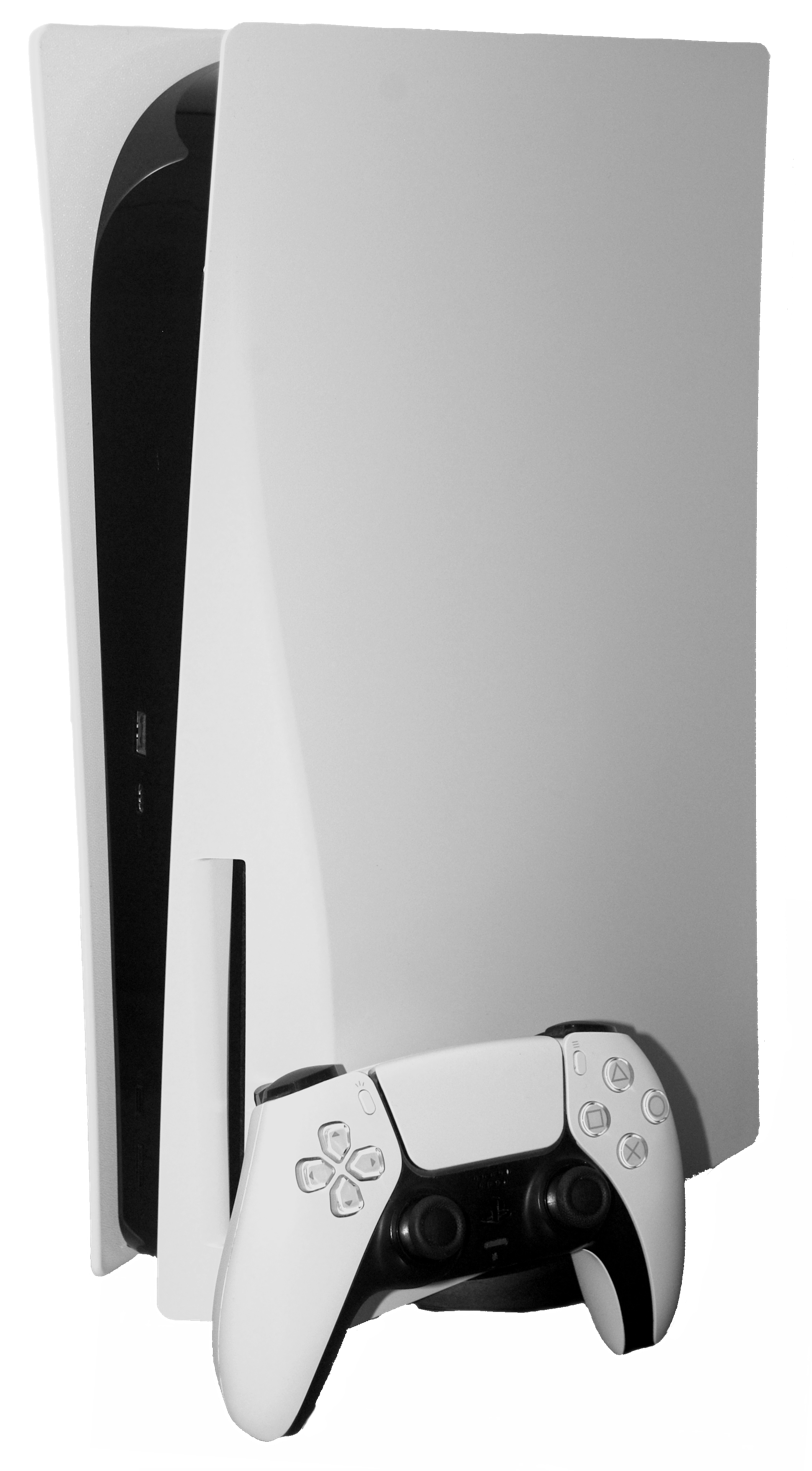
- The original PlayStation 5 console with optical drive, and DualSense controller
- Also known as: PS5
- Developer: Sony Interactive Entertainment
- Manufacturer: Sony, Foxconn
- Product family: PlayStation
- Type: Home video game console
- Generation: Ninth
- Released: November 12, 2020: AU/JP/KR/NA/NZ: November 12, 2020; WW: November 19, 2020; PHI: December 11, 2020; INA: January 22, 2021; IND: February 2, 2021; VIE: March 19, 2021; CHN: May 15, 2021
- Introductory price: Base / Digital Edition / Pro; US$499 / US$399 / US$699; €499 / €399 / €799; ¥49,980 / ¥39,980 / ¥119,980
- Units shipped: 100 million (As of November 10, 2026)
- Media: Ultra HD Blu-ray; Blu-ray; DVD; Download
- CPU: Custom AMD 8-core Zen 2: Base & Slim: Max clock speed is 3.5 GHz; Pro: Max clock speed is 3.85 GHz
- Memory: 16 GB GDDR6 SDRAM; 512 MB DDR4 RAM (used as SSD controller cache); 2 GB DDR5 RAM (used for system; Pro only)
- Storage: Custom integrated PCIe 4.0 NVMe SSD; Base: 825 GB; Slim (Disc): 1 TB; Slim (Digital): 825 GB (Note: formerly 1 TB); Pro: 2 TB; Expandable up to 8 TB via M.2 NVMe PCIe Gen4 x4 port
- Removable storage: USB-based, up to 8 TB
- Display: All models: 720p, 1080i, 1080p, 1440p, 4K; Pro: 720p, 1080i, 1080p, 1440p, 4K, 8K
- Graphics: Custom AMD Radeon; Base & Slim; RDNA 2-based architecture; 36 CUs at max clock 2.23 GHz; 10.28 TFLOPS peak; Pro; RDNA 2 & RDNA 3-based with RDNA 4 RTRT cores mixed architecture; 60 CUs at max clock 2.35 GHz; 18.05 TFLOPS peak
- Sound: Tempest Engine 3D Audio; Dolby Atmos; 7.1 surround sound; DTS:X (Blu-ray & UHD Blu-ray video)
- Controller input: DualSense (Edge), DualShock 4, PlayStation Move, PS5 Media Remote, PlayStation VR2 Sense controllers
- Connectivity: Wi-Fi 6 (Base & Slim) or Wi-Fi 7 (Pro); Bluetooth 5.1; Gigabit Ethernet; 3× USB 3.2 Gen 2×1; 1× USB 2.0; 1× HDMI 2.1
- Online services: PlayStation Network; PlayStation Plus
- Dimensions: Dimensions: Base: 390 × 260 × 104 mm (15.4 × 10.2 × 4.1 in); Base Digital: 390 × 260 × 92 mm (15.4 × 10.2 × 3.6 in); Slim: 358 × 216 × 96 mm (14.1 × 8.5 × 3.8 in); Slim Digital: 358 × 216 × 80 mm (14.1 × 8.5 × 3.1 in); Pro: 388 × 216 × 89 mm (15.3 × 8.5 × 3.5 in)
- Weight: Mass: Base: 2020: 4.5 kg (9.9 lb); 2021: 4.2 kg (9.3 lb); 2022: 3.9 kg (8.6 lb); 2023: 3.2 kg (7.1 lb); Digital: 2020: 3.9 kg (8.6 lb); 2021: 3.6 kg (7.9 lb); 2022: 3.4 kg (7.5 lb); 2023: 2.6 kg (5.7 lb); Pro: 3.1 kg (6.8 lb)
- Best-selling game: Grand Theft Auto VI (32.5 million) (list)
- Backward compatibility: PlayStation 4 games, PlayStation VR games
- Predecessor: PlayStation 4
- Website: playstation.com/ps5

The PlayStation 5 (PS5) is a home video game console developed by Sony Interactive Entertainment as the fifth iteration of their PlayStation brand. It was announced as the successor to the PlayStation 4 in April 2019, and was launched in Australia, Japan, New Zealand, North America, and South Korea on November 12, 2020, and worldwide a week later. The PS5 is part of the ninth generation of video game consoles, along with Microsoft's Xbox Series X/S consoles, which were released the same month.

The base model includes an optical disc drive compatible with Ultra HD Blu-ray discs. The Digital Edition lacks this drive, as a lower-cost model for buying games only through download. The two variants were launched simultaneously. Slimmer hardware revisions of both models replaced the original models on sale in November 2023. A PlayStation 5 Pro model was released on November 7, 2024, featuring a faster GPU, improved ray tracing, and introducing an AI-driven upscaling technology.

The PlayStation 5's main hardware features include a solid-state drive customized for high-speed data streaming to enable significant improvements in storage performance, a GPU by AMD capable of 4K resolution display at up to 120 frames per second, hardware-accelerated ray tracing for realistic lighting and reflections, and the Tempest Engine for hardware-accelerated 3D audio effects. Other features include the DualSense controller with haptic feedback, backward compatibility with the majority of PlayStation 4 and PlayStation VR games, and the PlayStation VR2 headset.

== History ==
=== Development ===
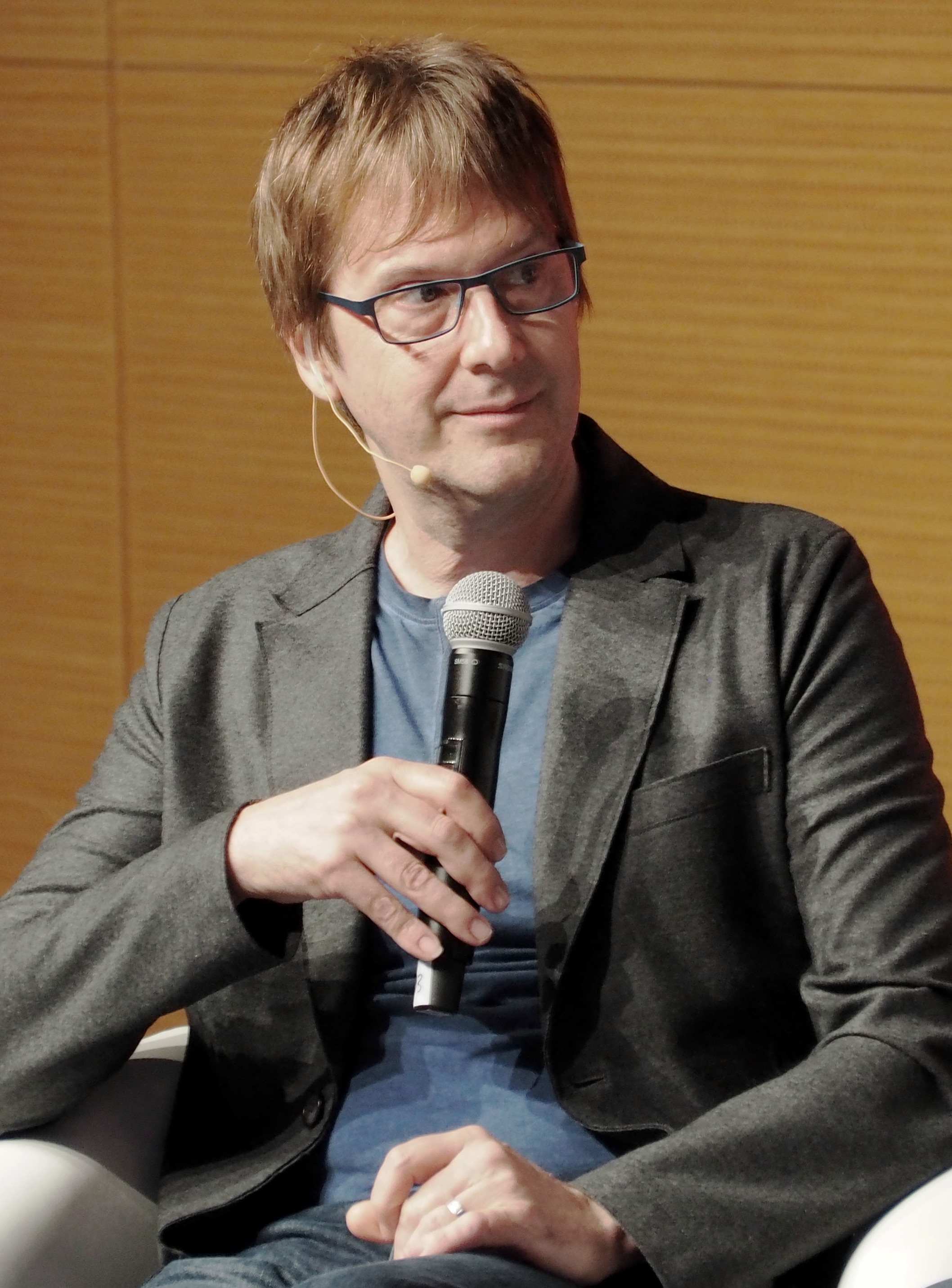
Mark Cerny, chief architect of PlayStation 5

The lead architect of the PlayStation console line, Mark Cerny, implemented a two-year feedback cycle after the launch of the PlayStation 4. This entailed regularly visiting Sony's first-party developers at two-year intervals to find out what concerns they had about Sony's hardware and how it could be improved in console refreshes or for the next generation. This feedback directly influenced the priorities of the development team. During the development of the PlayStation 5, a central challenge revolved around addressing the length of loading times for games. Cerny said several developers, including Epic Games' Tim Sweeney, told him that standard I/O speed of a hard disk drive was now a limiting factor in pushing game development. Slow data rates placed limits on the size of data being loaded into the game, the physical location of data on the storage medium, and the duplication of data across the medium in order to reduce load times. An important goal was to find ways to reduce loading time, particularly in games that stream or dynamically load new game areas as the player moves through the game world.

Jim Ryan, then CEO of Sony Interactive Entertainment, stated that Sony had researched the feasibility of a "low priced, reduced spec" version of the PlayStation 5, like what Microsoft had done with its lower-power counterpart to the Xbox Series X, the Xbox Series S, and concluded that they believed such consoles do not fare well, becoming obsolete too fast.

=== Marketing and release ===
Cerny first publicly described the new console in an interview with Wired magazine in April 2019. In early 2019, Sony's financial report for the quarter ending March 31, 2019, affirmed that new next-generation hardware was in development but would ship no earlier than April 2020. In a second Wired magazine interview in October 2019, Sony said it intended to ship its next-generation console worldwide by the end of 2020. The current hardware specifications were revealed in October 2019. At CES 2020, Sony unveiled the official logo for the platform, which follows the similar minimalist styling of the previous PlayStation consoles and brand. Full specifications were given in an online presentation by Cerny and published by Sony and Digital Foundry on March 18, 2020. Digital Foundry spoke with Cerny in detail and published a "deep dive" on April 2.

A major game library showcase had been planned for June 4, 2020, but was postponed until June 11 due to the George Floyd protests. This presentation was also the premiere of the PS5's external design.

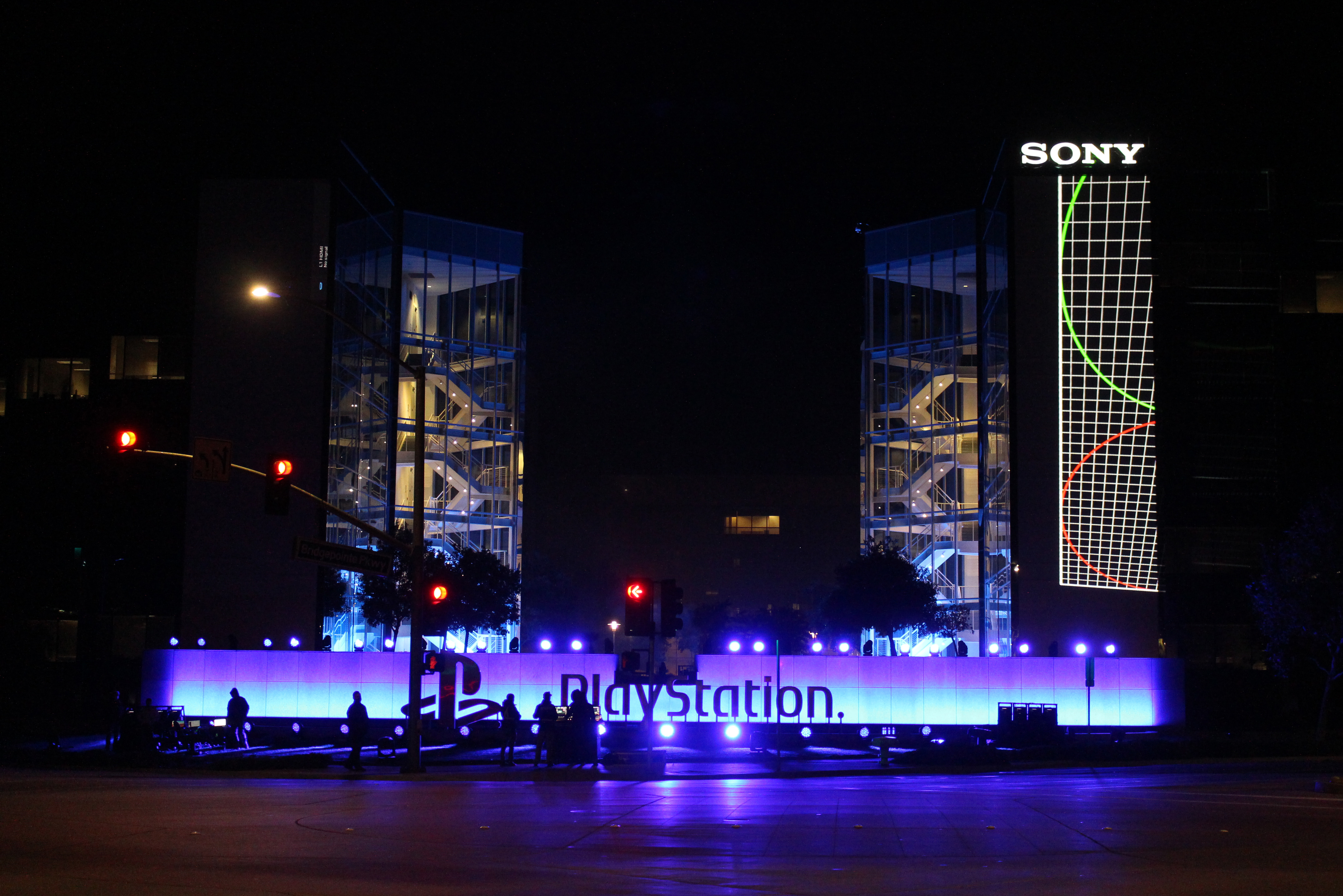
Event lighting being set up at SIE headquarters on the evening of November 8, 2020; four days before the launch

Sony planned to launch the PlayStation 5 by the 2020 end-of-year holiday period.

PlayStation 5 sales by country (as of March 2025): Available Officially sold but currently not supported by PlayStation Services, including PlayStation Network and PlayStation Store (Philippines and Vietnam) Suspended by Sony (Russia) Unavailable

The date and pricing was confirmed as part of a game showcase presentation on September 16, 2020; the release date in Australia, Japan, New Zealand, North America, and South Korea was confirmed for November 12, 2020, and for most of the rest of the world on November 19, 2020. The console was launched in the Philippines on December 11, 2020.

PlayStation 5's release in India was delayed, leading to speculation that a trademark dispute was the reason; the name "PS5" was briefly trademarked by a different person. Eventually, the dispute was resolved and the system released there on February 2, 2021. The console launched in Indonesia on January 22, 2021. The system launched in China on May 15, 2021.

The console launched with two models: a base version with an Ultra HD Blu-ray compatible optical disc drive for retail game support alongside online distribution via the PlayStation Store, and a lower-cost variant lacking the disc drive and retaining digital download support.

Following the September 16, 2020, presentation, Sony stated that pre-orders for the console were to open at various retailers on the following day. However, several retailers in the United States and the United Kingdom launched pre-orders that evening, causing a rush on pre-orders, including scalping as many stores' inventories were quickly sold out, and creating confusion. Sony apologized for the incident on September 19, 2020, and promised to increase more pre-order deliveries over the coming days and stock through the end of the year.

Worldwide supply of the console remained low due to a global chip shortage from 2020 to 2023. Sony expected a short retail stock until 2023; the company said that the supply chain issues were fixed. In August 2022, Sony announced a price increase by up to 20% in most of its markets except the US, citing global economic, inflationary, and supply chain pressures. A price increase in the US, raising the cost of all units by $50 took effect in August 2025, citing a "challenging economic environment". Accessories were not affected. On April 2, 2026, Sony implemented a global price increase for PlayStation 5 hardware, further raising the PS5 Digital Edition's price by $50 and the PS5 Pro's price by $150 in the United States, citing the "global economic landscape" as the reason.

In July 2026, Sony announced that it would stop producing physical PlayStation game discs from January 2028, making new PlayStation 5 games available only through digital purchase. This resulted in severe backlash and several legal challenges from many consumers, sellers, consumer organizations, studios, and legislators. Sony later announced they will "cautiously" handle the transition.

== Hardware ==
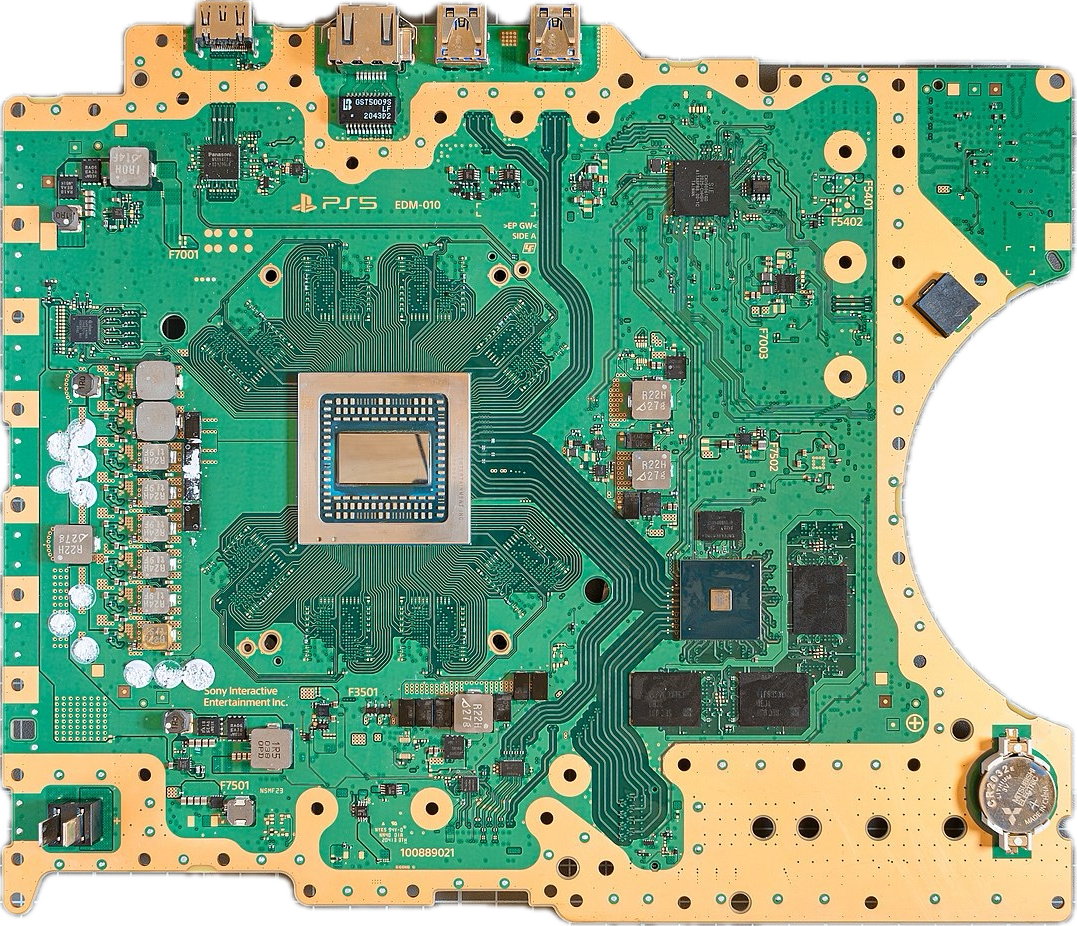
PlayStation 5 motherboard

The PlayStation 5 features a custom system on a chip (SoC) developed by AMD in collaboration with Sony, integrating both the CPU and GPU. The eight-core CPU is based on AMD's Zen 2 architecture and built on a 7 nm process, operating at a variable frequency up to 3.5 GHz. The GPU is based on AMD's RDNA 2 architecture, with 36 compute units running at up to 2.23 GHz, delivering a theoretical peak performance of 10.28 teraFLOPS. It also supports hardware-accelerated real-time ray tracing, a technique that simulates how light interacts with objects to produce more realistic lighting and shadows. The GPU is programmed via Sony's new graphics API named AGC. The PlayStation 5 includes a custom "boost" system based on AMD's SmartShift technology. This system dynamically adjusts the CPU and GPU speeds depending on what the game or application needs, balancing performance and power consumption.

The console's cooling system uses a double-sided intake fan that is 120 mm (4.7 in) in diameter and 45 mm (1.8 in) thick, paired with a large heat sink utilizing a heat pipe design that Sony claims has a "shape and airflow [which] make it possible to achieve the same performance as a vapor chamber". A layer of liquid metal between the chip and the heat sink improves heat transfer. The console uses a 350-watt internal power supply and is designed to consume less energy while in rest mode compared to the PlayStation 4.

The PlayStation 5 includes 16 GB of GDDR6 SDRAM connected via a 256-bit interface and capable of reaching a peak bandwidth of 448 GB/s. This unified memory pool is shared between the CPU and GPU. The console supports Bluetooth 5.1 and Wi-Fi 6 (802.11ax). The console has a new audio processing system called the Tempest Engine, which supports hundreds of simultaneous sound sources, compared to 50 on the PlayStation 4.

=== Storage architecture ===
The PlayStation 5 features 825 GB of built-in solid-state storage, of which 667 GB is available to the user for game installation. The flash memory chips and controller are soldered directly to the motherboard, providing 5.5 GB/s of raw bandwidth via a 12-channel interface. A dedicated decompression unit supporting zlib and Oodle Kraken formats allows for typical throughput of 8–9 GB/s, peaking at 22 GB/s. An internal M.2-format solid-state drive (SSD) slot supports user-installed NVMe drives up to 8 TB. SSD support was added in a system update in September 2021 following a public beta. PCI Express 3.0 and earlier M.2 SSDs are not supported by PlayStation 5.

Games must be installed onto either the built-in SSD or an M.2 SSD. However, to save space, developers may allow selective installation of features such as a multiplayer mode. External USB drives (up to 8 TB) are also supported; however, only PlayStation 4 games can be played directly from USB storage. PlayStation 5 games can be stored on an external drive but must be transferred to internal or SSD storage for gameplay.

The standard model includes an Ultra HD Blu-ray drive supporting Ultra HD Blu-ray, standard Blu-ray, and DVD formats, but not CDs or 3D Blu-rays. PlayStation 5 game discs can hold up to 100 GB of data, double the capacity of standard Blu-ray discs used for most PlayStation 4 games.

=== Form factor ===
The PlayStation 5's form factor was revealed during its June 11, 2020 presentation. The launch model features a two-tone design with a black central unit flanked by white side panels, matching the DualSense controller. Blue LEDs accent the edges. The console can be oriented vertically or horizontally. Long air intake vents run along the front, while heat is exhausted through vents at the rear. The console's large size in comparison to previous gaming consoles has drawn attention. This design allows for effective cooling management and reduced fan noise during operation. Senior Art Director Yujin Morisawa led the case design, balancing aesthetics with internal volume and airflow requirements.

The side panels are removable, allowing access to components such as the SSD expansion slot and the optional Ultra HD Blu-ray drive. Two dust collection channels are also accessible for maintenance. Front ports on the launch versions of the console include one USB-C (USB 3.1 Gen 2) and one USB-A (USB 2.0), while the rear offers two USB-A ports (USB 3.1 Gen 2), an HDMI 2.1 port, Gigabit Ethernet, and power.

When in its vertical position, the launch version of the console with an optical disc drive measures 390 millimeters (15 in) high, 260 mm (10 in) deep, 104 mm (4.1 in) wide, and weighs 4.5 kilograms (9.9 lb). The digital edition is slightly slimmer at 92 mm (3.6 in) wide and initially weighed 3.9 kg (8.6 lb).

=== Hardware revisions ===
==== Standard model ====
Sony released a minor hardware revision of the PlayStation 5 in August 2021. This version, the 1100 series, features a smaller heatsink without a significant impact on cooling performance. The revision also eliminated the need for a screwdriver when attaching the console stand. As a result, the overall weight was reduced to 3.9 kg (8.6 lb) for the model with an optical disc drive and 3.6 kg (7.9 lb) for the digital edition.

Another revision, the 1200-series, began shipping in August 2022. This version featured a die shrink of the SoC, reducing power consumption, allowing Sony to redesign the heatsink again, contributing to a weight decrease. The revised model with an optical disc drive weighs 3.9 kg (8.6 lb) and the digital edition weighs 3.4 kg (7.5 lb).

==== PlayStation 5 Slim ====
Sony announced revised models of the PlayStation 5 and PlayStation 5 Digital Edition in October 2023, with a release scheduled for November 2023. These models, colloquially referred to as the "PlayStation 5 Slim", are physically smaller and replaced the original versions of the system. The front USB-A port was replaced with a second USB-C port, though it still operates at USB 2.0 speeds. At launch, both versions included 1 TB of internal storage, but the Digital Edition was later reduced to 825 GB of internal storage.

The revised Digital Edition was priced higher than the original; in the US, it was $50 more expensive. An optional Ultra HD Blu-ray disc drive can be purchased separately for $80 and attached to the Digital Edition, making it functionally and visually equivalent to the standard model. When positioned vertically, the model with an optical disc drive measures 358 mm (14.1 in) high, 216 mm (8.5 in) deep, 96 mm (3.8 in) wide, and weighs 3.9 kg (8.6 lb). The digital edition is slightly slimmer at 80 mm (3.1 in) wide and weighs 2.6 kg (5.7 lb).

==== PlayStation 5 Pro ====
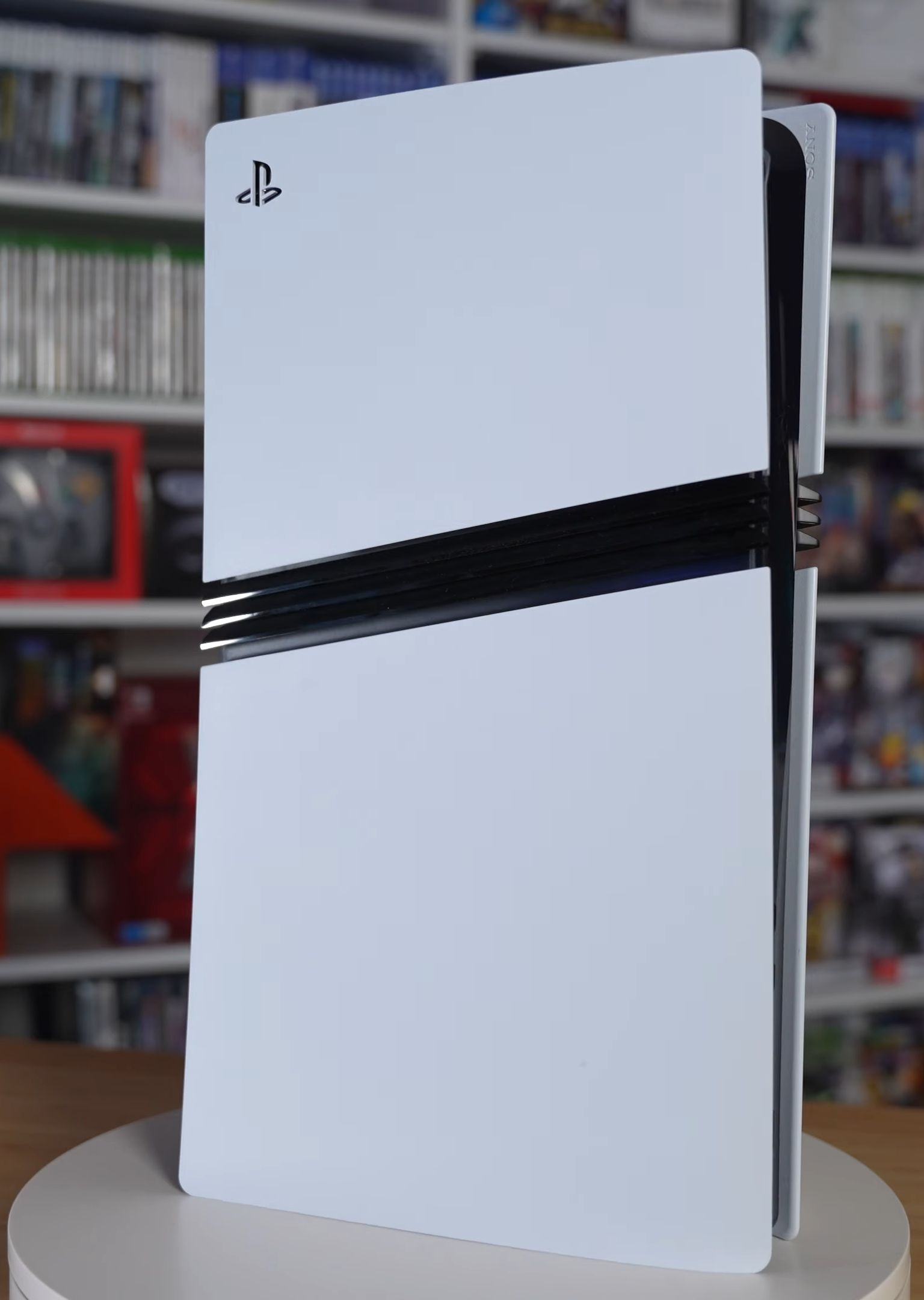
PS5 Pro with visible black "gills" on the sides

Sony announced the PlayStation 5 Pro (PS5 Pro) on September 10, 2024, following industry rumors since March 2024. Among other changes, the new console has three primary improvements: a GPU about 45% faster than that in the existing PlayStation 5, a deep learning-based image upscaling technology called PlayStation Spectral Super Resolution (PSSR), and twice as fast ray tracing performance compared to the PlayStation 5. As a result, games optimized for the Pro are expected to support 4K resolutions at 60 frames per second. It also ships with 2 TB of internal SSD storage, but does not include an optical disc drive nor vertical stand, which can be purchased separately. The Pro unit also includes support for Wi-Fi 7 and 8K resolution output. Games can be patched to access features of the Pro system, with 50 games expected to be ready with enhanced versions by the system launch. Industry rumors stated that Sony's internal studios had been working with the devkit version of the Pro console as early as September 2023. A Game Boost feature would also allow selected PS4 games to have improved resolutions on the Pro system, with about 8,500 such games set to use this feature at launch. The Pro model was released globally on November 7, 2024, with a price of US$699 / £699 / €799.

The pricing of the PS5 Pro made it one of the most expensive consoles to be released when accounting for inflation, and the second most-expensive within the PlayStation line following the original PlayStation 3 price of $499+. Rolling Stone observed an "overwhelmingly negative" response to the console's limited increase of benefits. Sports Illustrated mocked the price, with editor Dave Aubrey writing: "It feels almost cruel, in a climate like this, to try and convince people that the PS5 Pro, with its meager enhancements, is actually worth the money." Sony president Hiroki Totoki stated in an investor call in November 2024 that the company did not believe the high price had a negative impact on sales, since the Pro model was targeting hardcore users who are willing to pay more for high performance.

==== Internal storage reduction ====
Starting in September 2025, the Digital Edition of the PS5 Slim was downgraded from 1 TB to 825 GB of internal storage. The disc drive edition was unaffected. The change occurred without announcement in Europe on September 13, 2025; without announcement in the United States on October 3, 2025; and with an announcement in Japan on November 11, 2025.

=== 30th anniversary editions ===
Limited quantities of the PS5 Digital Edition and PS5 Pro, with gray cases and special branding, were released on November 21, 2024, to celebrate the brand's 30th anniversary. Similar branded PlayStation DualSense, DualSense Edge, and PlayStation Portal devices were also made available.

=== DualSense and DualSense Edge controllers ===
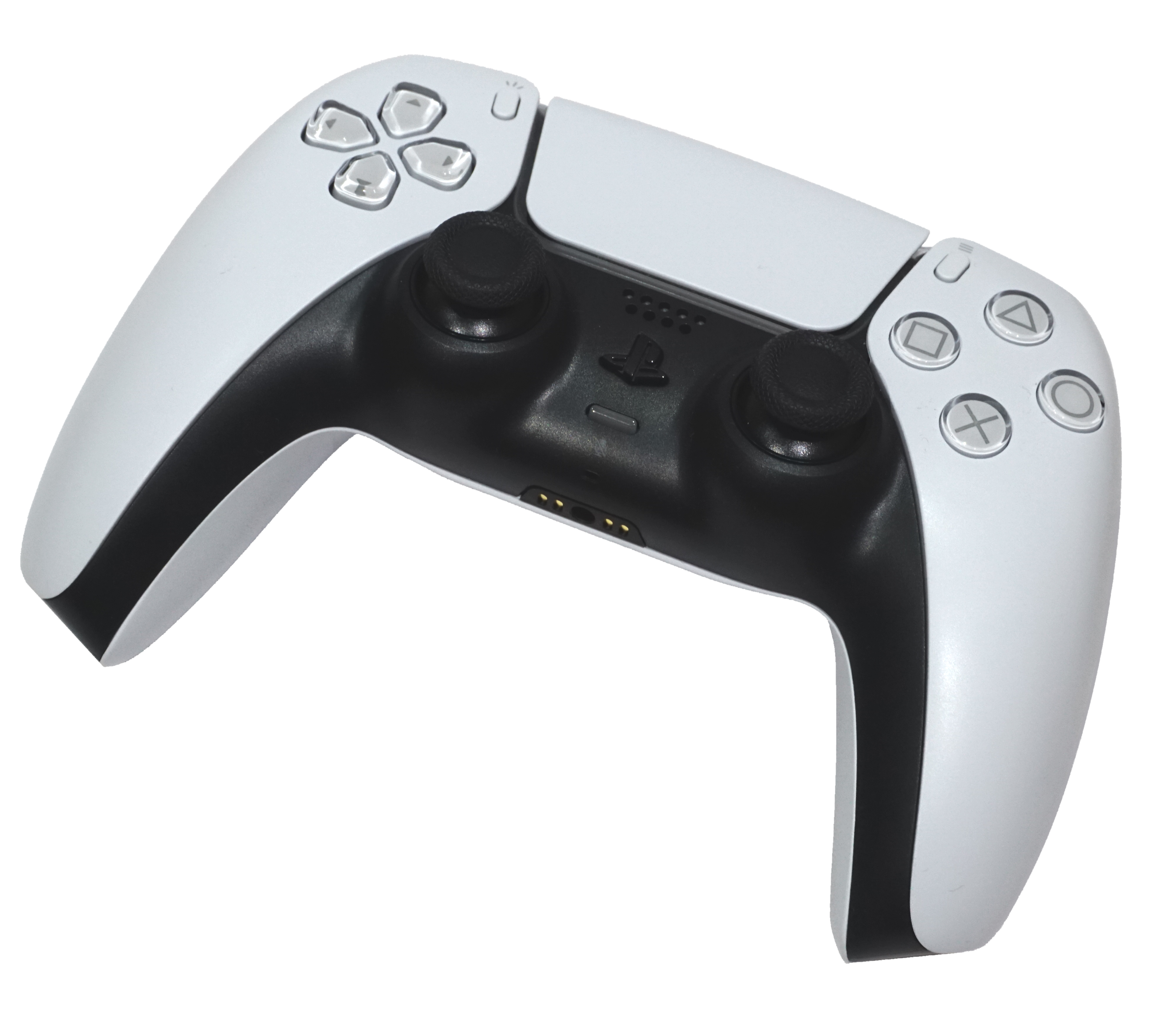
The DualSense controller

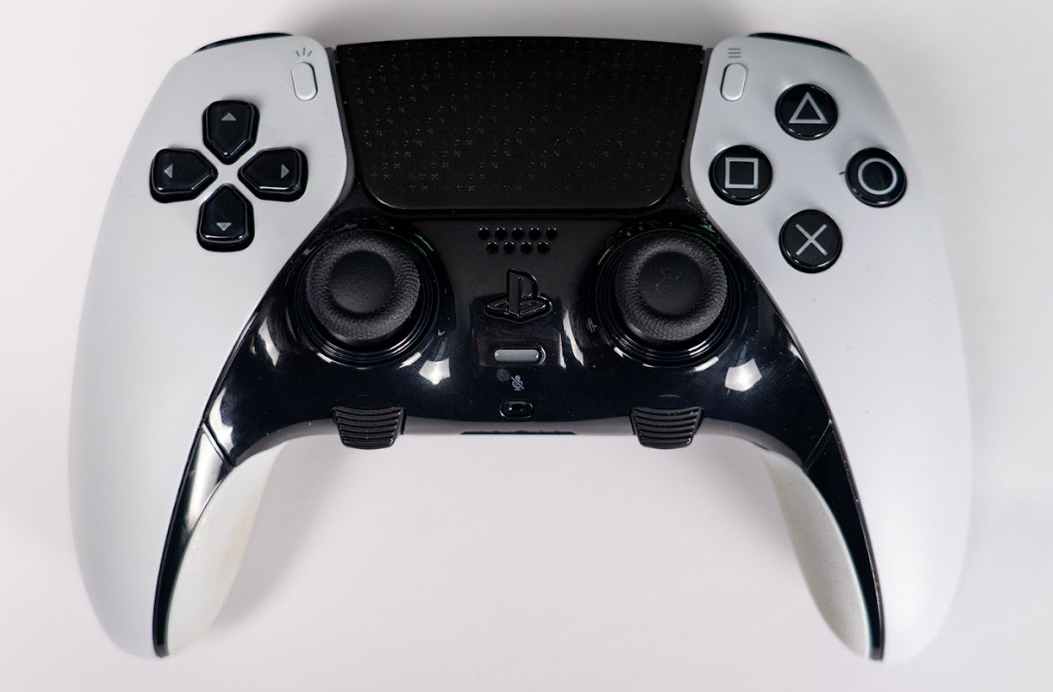
The DualSense Edge controller

The DualSense wireless controller for the PlayStation 5 was revealed on April 7, 2020. It is based on the prior DualShock controller but with modifications influenced by discussions with game designers and players. The DualSense controller has adaptive triggers with force feedback through voice coil actuators that can change the resistance to the player as necessary, supporting experiences such as virtually drawing an arrow from a bow. The DualSense maintains the same buttons as the DualShock 4, though the "Share" button was renamed to "Create" with additional means for players to create and share content. A new built-in microphone array was added so players can speak to others using only the controller, and the included controller speaker has been improved. It has two-tone coloring, primarily white with black facing, with the black piece being easily detachable. The light bar has been moved to the sides of the touchpad. It has USB-C connectivity, a higher-rated battery, and an audio jack. As an Easter egg, the texture of the controller unit is covered in miniature versions of the four PlayStation button symbols (cross, circle, square, and triangle).

Sony revealed the DualSense Edge (CFI-ZCP1), a new controller for the PlayStation 5 featuring additional capabilities, in August 2022. The controller features a more modular design than the DualSense with replaceable stick modules, multiple control profiles and an option of relocating map inputs. The controller was initially released on January 26, 2023, on PlayStation Direct, but was made available through other retailers on February 23, 2023.

=== Additional accessories ===
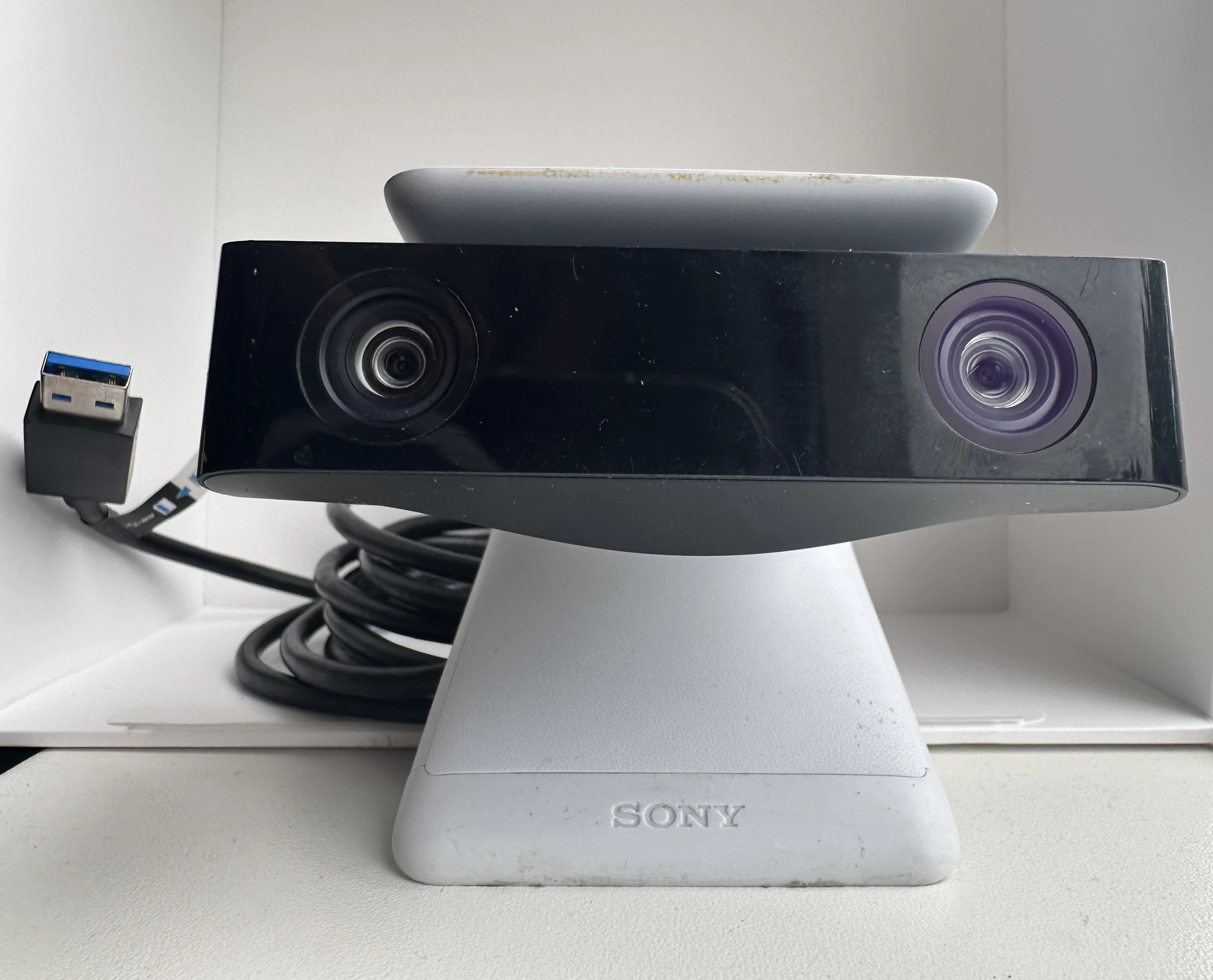
HD Camera

Accessories include a charging station for the DualSense, a new HD camera, and a media remote control. The Pulse 3D wireless headset is integrated with the PS5's Tempest Engine 3D audio technology. The PS5 is backwards compatible with most existing PS4 controllers and accessories for PS4 games only – some with limited functionality. Rock Band peripherals are supported since Rock Band 2. PS5 games can use the existing PlayStation Move, PlayStation Camera, PlayStation VR Aim Controller, officially licensed headsets, and specialty controllers with official licenses like flight sticks and racing wheels.

==== PlayStation Portal ====
The PlayStation Portal is a handheld gaming accessory for the PlayStation 5, developed by Sony Interactive Entertainment, first released on November 15, 2023. It is used to stream video games from a PlayStation 5 via the Portal's Wi-Fi connection using Remote Play technology. The Portal is able to control the console using its own built-in capacitive touch screen and DualSense-like controller styled like a handheld game console, although it does not run any games or media natively on its own.

==== PlayStation VR2 ====
Sony announced the PlayStation VR2 for the PlayStation 5 in January 2022. A successor to the PlayStation VR, the device consists of a headset featuring dual OLED panels capable of 4K resolution, HDR and 90/120 Hz refresh rates. It also includes two Sense controllers which have 14 embedded IR LEDs for tracking, and haptic feedback and adaptive triggers, similar to the DualSense controller included with the PlayStation 5. The headset features eye-tracking for foveated rendering and in-game features in select games. Additionally, the controllers includes finger touch detection, used to render the position of the thumb, index and middle fingers to show on in-game models. Unlike its predecessor, it does not require external cameras for it positioning; instead, it uses four cameras inside the headset to track the headset and controller's position, using only the headset's USB-C cable to connect to the console.

The headset launched on February 22, 2023, for $549.99 in the United States, €599.99 in the EU, and £529.99 in the United Kingdom. Games available for the PS VR2 at launch included Horizon Call of the Mountain, Gran Turismo 7, and Resident Evil Village. The headset is not compatible with games released for the previous generation PS VR by default, requiring developers to update their games. The PlayStation VR2 released to positive reviews, but was later criticized for a lack of continued support.

==== Media Remote control ====
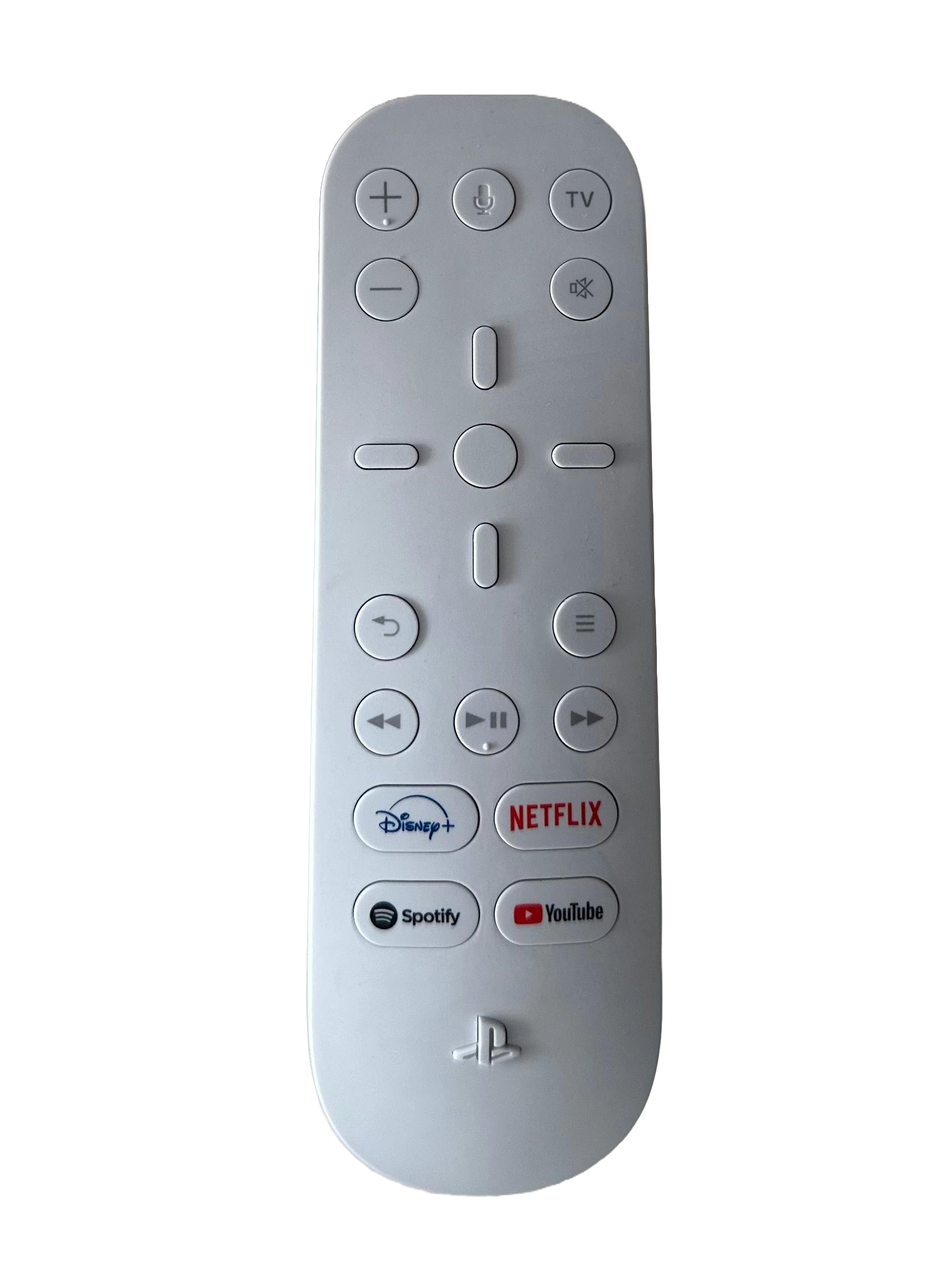
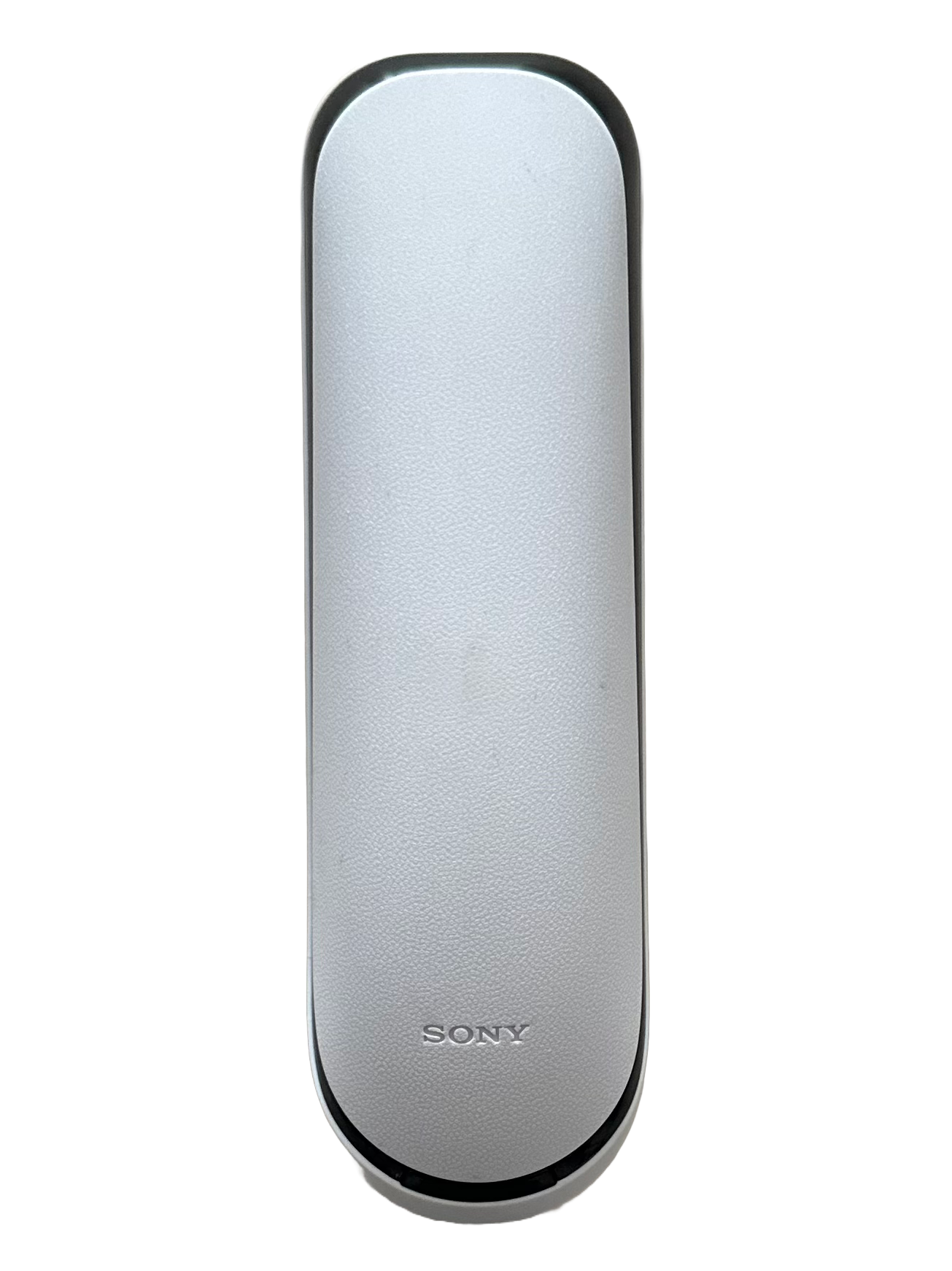
Media Remote control, front and back

Sony released a media remote control with a built-in IR transmitter, that can also control the TV. It is white with 20 buttons on the front, including a PlayStation button, Options button, Back button, directional buttons, media control buttons (play, pause, forward, rewind), a button to turn on the TV (via HDMI CEC), control the volume, microphone, and four buttons to access streaming apps: Disney+, Netflix, Spotify and YouTube. Differently of previous PlayStation media remote controls, it features no action buttons (cross, circle, square, and triangle). The back side, that is also white, features no buttons and has the same texture pattern as the DualSense controller. The backplate can be removed, which shows the two AA batteries power input, as well as the model, CFI-ZMR1. It is not compatible with PlayStation 4 console.

== System software ==
The PlayStation 5 home screen

The PlayStation 5's user interface is characterized by Sony as "accessible and informative", providing updates of friends' activities, available multiplayer activities, and single-player missions and rewards. Cerny stated "we don't want the player to have to boot the game, see what's up, boot the game, see what's up", so all of these options are "visible in the UI". Matt MacLaurin, the current vice president of UX design at PlayStation, described the redesigned user interface as a "very interesting evolution of the OS", and a "100 percent overhaul of the PS4 UI and some very different new concepts". MacLaurin stated that the UI is extremely fast with a new and robust visual language.

Eurogamer said the user interface was conceived for responsiveness, improved accessibility, clarity, and simplicity. It is rendered in 4K resolution and high dynamic range. Users are greeted with a stylistic boot-up animation and a new login screen. The central design concepts and motifs introduced on the PS4 were redesigned into a new home screen user interface. The top of the screen has a row of applications, and two upper tabs to switch between showing games or media apps. Selecting a game reveals individual activities such as a specific level or multiplayer mode. PlayStation Store is no longer a standalone application and is now fully integrated into the home screen user interface.

The most significant departure from the PS4 interface is the introduction of the Control Center, which can be accessed from the bottom of the screen by pressing the PS button. The Control Center is divided into two sections. The upper portion is a row of cards suggesting actions based on the current game or recent actions such as a group chat. Game-related cards may present players with gameplay information such as a progress report toward completing specific missions, or listing game challenges with an option to jump directly to them. PlayStation Plus subscribers see game activity cards with hints, tips, screenshots, or videos detailing how to complete the activity. System-level items may present the player with options such as PlayStation Store sale information, or recent screenshots taken by the user to be shared. These features are available for PS5 games or for updated PS4 games. The lower portion of the Control Center contains a customizable horizontal row of icons, including notifications, status updates, friends list, and system settings. According to internal materials reviewed by Vice, the strategy behind this "activities"-focused UI was to help players in committing time towards games, particularly single-player video games, which Sony felt were thriving on the PlayStation console environment. Sony recognized that at present, many players did not have as much time to commit to playing games, so the notion of activity cards was used to help give players an idea of what activities they could do in a game and how long it would take so that they could work that activity into their schedule.

=== On demand streaming and FAST television ===
The PlayStation 5 supports multiple streaming services such as Netflix and YouTube, with support for others hinted at in the future. Sony Pictures Core service was released on the system in 2023. The system included support for PlayStation Now, Sony's subscription-based cloud gaming service, while it was available. Sony's Remote Play application, available on the PlayStation 4, Windows, iOS, and Android devices, was updated just prior to the PlayStation 5's launch to allow a user to remotely play their PlayStation 5 games on these other devices over a local network. Sony announced the launch of Live TV on PS5 on August 31, 2026, which enables the PS5 to stream hundreds of FAST channels.

=== Software updates ===
In April 2021, Sony released a new software update through which users can transfer their downloaded PS5 game to an external USB hard drive. Sony announced a PlayStation 5 system software beta program in June 2021, similar to the Xbox Insider program, where signed-up users can receive early releases of planned updates to the console's software for testing prior to their release. One of the first major features offered in this program was support for expanding internal storage via the M.2 port, added in the beta software path in July 2021.

In September 2021, Sony released a new software update offering support for a new trophy tracker, Control Center customization, 3D audio support for built-in TV speakers, internal SSD expansion and several UX enhancements. Sony introduced Game Trials in October 2021, starting with a limited release for UK users for Death Stranding: Director's Cut and Sackboy: A Big Adventure. Users have access to download and play the full version of the game for a fixed amount of time through these Game Trials, after which they would be required to buy the game to continue playing.

In March 2022, Sony released software update 5.00 which adds several improvements for accessibility such as an improved screen reader with support for features like mono audio, reading notifications aloud, additional language support, and the ability to show a check mark on enabled settings. Support for voice commands was also introduced in this update for users in the United States and United Kingdom, which allows users to control their PlayStation 5 by saying "Hey, PlayStation" and then a chosen command. Support for the Ukrainian language was also added, and Game Base was enhanced with the abilities to view all friends in a new "Friends" tab, more easily decline friend requests, and other enhancements and updates. There were also various enhancements made to trophies, child accounts, the home screen, and other features.

On March 8, 2023, Sony released software update 7.00, which included VRR support for 1440p resolution, the ability to transfer data between PS5 consoles, support for voice chat on Discord, and support for using voice to save video clips of gameplay (at release, this is only available in English for the US and UK).

On September 13, 2023, Sony released software update 8.00, which included support for Dolby Atmos, the possibility to use an M.2 SSD with a maximum capacity of 8 TB (up from the previous 4 TB limit), and the ability to mute the start-up beep sound.

On March 13, 2024, Sony released software update 9.00, which included the ability to adjust the brightness of the PS5's power indicator, added new features in Parties and Share Screen, and improved the DualSense and DualSense Edge wireless controllers mic input quality with a new AI machine-learning model.

On September 12, 2024, Sony released software update 10.00, which added the Welcome hub, Party Share, personalized 3D audio profiles, adaptive controller charging, and support for enabling remote play for individual users.

On March 25, 2025, Sony released software update 11.00, which added full details displaying on activity cards, support for Unicode 16.0 emojis, parental control adjustments, system performance and stability improvements, and refinements to messages and overall usability on certain system screens.

On September 17, 2025, Sony released software update 12.00, which added a power saver for supported PS5 games, and a feature that allows the wireless controllers to be paired across multiple devices simultaneously.

On March 24, 2026, Sony released software update 13.00, which added enhanced PSSR (PlayStation Spectral Super Resolution) on PS5 Pro, support for Unicode 17.0 emojis, and new features for the Welcome hub.

On September 16, 2026, Sony released software update 14.00, which added the Community Activity widget for the Welcome Hub, a tweak for enhanced PSSR on the PS5 Pro, and a speaker indicator.

== Games ==
Each PlayStation 5 console comes preinstalled with Astro's Playroom, a game designed to serve as a demonstration of the DualSense controller. Games are not region locked, so games purchased in one region can be played on consoles in all regions.

Sony announced its concurrent responsibilities of supporting the PlayStation 4 community, and embracing the PlayStation 5 as a major technological advancement. In an interview with GamesIndustry.biz, Ryan stated "We have always said that we believe in generations. We believe that when you go to all the trouble of creating a next-gen console, that it should include features and benefits that the previous generation does not include. And that, in our view, people should make games that can make the most of those features." Discussing the capabilities of the DualSense controller with Geoff Keighley, General manager Eric Lempel affirmed that Sony "want[s] to evolve every part of the experience", but for that to happen "we can't take everybody with us from previous consoles into [a next-generation experience]. You need new hardware, you need new devices to experience what these developers want you to experience." Ratchet & Clank: Rift Apart was highlighted as a next-generation game that is not technically possible on older hardware. Lempel assured Keighley that interest in PlayStation 4 would not end abruptly, with more to come.

Sony's definition of consoles as distinct generations had been widely interpreted as an era-defining shift to PS5-exclusive games that exploit the console's capabilities instead of releasing cross-generation games that play across both PlayStation consoles. Ryan said that there should be no disappointment as the PS5 versions take advantage of the console's advanced feature set and initially planned that PS4 versions can be freely upgraded. Few major games such as Horizon Forbidden West are developed as concurrent releases for PS5 and PS4, and Sony supports any publisher that wants to offer enhanced versions of PS4 games at no additional cost. However, in May 2021, Sony announced a major shift in this approach, with previously PS5-exclusive games Gran Turismo 7 and God of War Ragnarök now planned as both PS5 and PS4 games. Game journalists believed this was a factor related to the effect of the global semiconductor shortage from the COVID-19 pandemic on PlayStation 5 availability. Sony initially had planned to charge PS4 users to upgrade to the PS5 version of Horizon Forbidden West when preorders were announced, but after negative feedback from consumers (who pointed out that Sony had previously mentioned that Horizon Forbidden West would have a free upgrade), stated that this upgrade would be free, but all future PS4 to PS5 upgrades from their first-party games would be at cost, reversing course from their earlier plans.

Eurogamer reported that Sony's certification program as of May 2020 required PS4 games, submitted for certification after July 13, 2020, to be natively compatible with the PlayStation 5.

=== Backward compatibility ===
According to Hideaki Nishino, Sony's senior vice president of Platform Planning and Management, the PS5 is designed to be backward compatible with more than "99 percent" of PS4's 4,000+ game library, playable from launch day. The console is compatible with PlayStation VR. Because of PS5's high-speed SSD and increased processing power, many PS4 games gain from improved loading times or gameplay speeds "so that they can benefit from higher or more stable frame rates and potentially higher resolutions". Players can synchronize their saved game files through cloud storage or transfer them using a USB storage device so no progress is lost. Backward compatibility is enabled in part by the similarity of hardware architecture, such as "extra logic" in the RDNA 2 GPU that ensures compatibility with PS4's GCN-based GPU. Mark Cerny explained during a March 2020 presentation and later in an interview with Digital Foundry how CPU clock timing required particular attention; though the Zen 2 CPU has an instruction set to handle the PS4's Jaguar CPU, their timings can be very different, so Sony worked closely with AMD when developing the Zen 2 CPU to more closely match the Jaguar's timings. PS5 backward compatibility may exhibit errors with some PS4 games, and does not include previous generations. However, some older PlayStation console games are available through the PlayStation Plus game streaming service which is available for the PlayStation 5. The PlayStation 4's Share menu cannot be displayed but the PS5's Create menu can be used to capture screenshots or video.

All compatible downloaded versions of PS4 games are visible in the library on the PS5 and available for download. The games can also be copied via USB hard drive or Wi-Fi. Save data can be copied in the same way or via the cloud storage. On October 9, 2020, Sony released a list of ten PS4 games identified as being incompatible with PS5; the list has shortened since as some developers released compatibility updates for previously incompatible games. As of December 16, 2021, the official PlayStation website shows six PS4 games that remain incompatible with PS5; Afro Samurai 2: Revenge of Kuma Volume One, Hitman Go: Definitive Edition, Just Deal With It!, Robinson: The Journey, Shadwen and We Sing. Additionally, the PlayStation 4 bundled game, The Playroom, is also not supported.

== Reception ==
The PlayStation 5 was generally well received at launch, with much praise of its DualSense controller's improved haptic feedback and adaptive triggers. Astro's Playroom, which comes preinstalled on every PS5 and is designed to demonstrate the controller's features, was praised with Laptop Mag calling it "deceptively cute". The exclusive line-up, including Spider-Man: Miles Morales and Demon's Souls, was heavily praised, although some reviewers, such as TechRadar, said there should have been more launch games. The console's user interface was generally praised for being fast and easy to navigate.

Many reviewers found the console's design polarizing. CNET described the black and white scheme as "clearly meant to be a sculptural conversation piece". The large size was criticized by Tom's Guide as "inelegant", and by others as frustrating towards its integration into a home entertainment center. Many also acknowledged the size for improving the cooling and quieting of its operation. The comparatively small 667 GB of usable SSD space was criticized.

More technical reviews, such as those by Digital Foundry, noted that features such as variable refresh rate and the advertised 8K video output mode were not present at launch. They lauded the ray tracing, SSD speed, and 120 Hz output capabilities.

=== Sales ===
The PlayStation 5, as with the Xbox Series X/S, was in limited supply immediately upon launch, and through 2021 due to a global semiconductor shortage, combined with increased demand for video game consoles due to the COVID-19 pandemic. Sony expected supply to continue to be limited until at least 2022. Scalpers took advantage of the shortage, attempting to sell the console for thousands of dollars. Sony expanded its PlayStation Direct program to sell consoles directly to consumers within Europe in November 2021 to bypass scalpers.

Two weeks after launch, Sony declared the largest launch in PlayStation history, surpassing the PlayStation 4's 2.1 million units in its first two weeks in 2013. During the system's first week of release in Japan, 103,901 standard consoles were sold, and 14,181 Digital Editions were sold, for a combined total of 118,082, making it the best-selling console in the country for that week. By September 2021, Sony reported over a million PS5 sales in Japan. In comparison, its predecessor did not reach a million units sold until a year after release. In the UK, the PS5 was the best-selling video game console sold in the month of November. In Spain, the PS5 sold over 43,000 units in the first week of release.

Sony reported total shipments of the PS5 through its fiscal quarter ending December 31, 2020 of 4.5 million units, which were similar numbers to the PS4's launch shipments. Total shipments of the PlayStation 5 reached 7.8 million by March 31, 2021, surpassing the 7.6 million units that the PS4 had shipped in its first two-quarters of release. Sony reported that as of July 18, 2021, 10 million PS5 units had been sold through, making the PS5 its fastest-selling console to date. The company later confirmed that by June 30, 2021, it had shipped 10.1 million consoles, indicating that nearly every shipped console had been sold as soon as it reached the market. Console shipments surpassed 13.4 million as of September 30, 2021. The company anticipated in August that it would have enough stock hardware to ship more than 22 million PS5 units by the end of its 2021 fiscal year in March 2022, but this was revised to 15 million units in November. Despite this, sales during the fiscal year 2022 were forecast to increase to 22.6 million units. Bloomberg News reported in January 2022 that Sony was continuing production of the PS4 rather than discontinue it at the end of 2021, in order to help alleviate the shortage of the PS5 while the chip shortage continued. By the end of September 2024, total shipments of PS5 units had reached 65 million units. Sony's quarterly financial results for Q2 2025 stated that the PlayStation 5 had shipped 84.2 million units.

Sales of the PS5 reached 20 million units by May 2022, 40 million units by July 2023, 50 million units by December 2023, 75 million units by February 2025 and 95 million units by June 2026.
