= Ultimate Spider-Man (disambiguation) =

Ultimate Spider-Man is a comic book by Marvel Comics, published from 2000 to 2011. The name may also make reference to:

- The main character of the comic book, Spider-Man (Ultimate Marvel character)
- Miles Morales, another character who became Spider-Man within those comics
- Ultimate Comics: Spider-Man, a later name of the comic
- Ultimate Spider-Man (2024), a 2024 reboot of the comic
- Ultimate Spider-Man (TV series), animated TV series by Disney XD
- Ultimate Spider-Man (video game), video game by Activision
- "Ultimate Spider-Man", Spider-Man (2017) season 1, episode 10 (2017)
