= Spider-Man (nickname) =

Spider-Man or Spiderman is the nickname of:

- Jordan Adams (born 1994), American college basketball player
- Hélio Castroneves (born 1975), Brazilian race car driver
- Linos Chrysikopoulos (born 1992), Greek basketball player
- Jonás Gutiérrez (born 1983), Argentine footballer
- Torii Hunter (born 1975), American Major League Baseball player
- Andre Rison (born 1967), American retired National Football League player
- Arwind Santos (born 1981), Filipino basketball player
- Darryl Talley (born 1960), American retired National Football League player
- Steve Veltman (born 1969), American former BMX racer
- Rubén Xaus (born 1978), Spanish retired motorcycle road racer
- Donovan Mitchell (born 1996), American professional basketball player

== See also ==
- Walter Zenga (born 1960), Italian retired football goalkeeper and current manager, nicknamed "Uomo Ragno ("Spider-Man")
- Alain Robert (born 1962), French rock climber and urban climber nicknamed "the French Spider-Man"
- Camilo Villegas (born 1982), Colombian golf player nicknamed "Hombre Araña" ("Spiderman")
- Theodore Edward Coneys (1882–1967), American murderer dubbed the "Denver Spiderman"
- Mamoudou Gassama (born 1996), French firefighter nicknamed "Spiderman" after he rescued a child dangling from a balcony
- Spider (nickname)
