= Spider (nickname) =

Spider is the nickname of:

- Edward Dawson Atkinson (1891–1934), British First World War flying ace
- Woody Brown (surfer) (1912–2008), American surfer and watercraft designer
- Albert Buick (1875–1948), Scottish footballer
- Spider Burks (1922–1975), American disc jockey who championed jazz music
- Matthew Burton (Australian footballer) (born 1970), retired Australian rules footballer
- Panagiotis Fasoulas (born 1963), Greek politician and former basketball player
- Michael "Spider" Gianco (1954–1970), American bartender murdered by Thomas DeSimone, portrayed in Goodfellas
- Dallas Green (baseball) (1934–2017), American Major League Baseball pitcher, manager and executive
- Rachid Harkouk (born 1956), Anglo-Algerian former footballer
- Spider Johnson (1907–1966), American football player
- Spider Jorgensen (1919–2003), American baseball player
- Zeljko Kalac (born 1972), Australian football goalkeeper and coach
- Billy Kelly (boxer) (1932–2010), boxer from Northern Ireland
- Jim Kelly (boxer) (1912–?), boxer from Northern Ireland
- John Koerner (1938–2024), American blues/folk musician
- Carl "Spider" Lockhart (1943–1986), American National Football League player
- Spider Matlock (1901–1936), American stuntman and racing mechanic
- William L. Nyland (born 1946), retired US Marine Corps four-star general
- Spider Robinson (born 1948), science fiction writer
- Spider Sabich (1945–1976), American alpine ski racer
- Anderson Silva (born 1975), Brazilian mixed martial arts fighter
- Spider Stacy (born 1958), English musician and member of The Pogues
- Darius Watts (born 1981), American former National Football League and arena football player
- Travis Webb (1910–1990), American race car driver
- Mark Webster (darts player) (born 1983), Welsh darts player
- Julián Álvarez (footballer) (born 2000), Argentine former footballer

== See also ==
- Donovan Mitchell (born 1996), American National Basketball Association player nicknamed "Spida"
- Louis XI (1423–1483), King of France known as "l'universelle aragne" ("the Universal Spider")
- Toni Kukoč (born 1968), Croatian retired National Basketball Association player nicknamed "the Spider from Split"
- Alain Robert (born 1962), French rock climber and urban climber nicknamed "the Human Spider"
- Roberto Vásquez (born 1983), Panamanian boxer nicknamed "La Araña" ("The Spider")
- Lev Yashin (1929–1990), Soviet-Russian football goalkeeper nicknamed "The Black Spider"
- Fabio Cudicini (1936–2025), Italian football goalkeeper nicknamed "Ragno Nero" ("Black Spider")
- Cesare Maestri (1929–2021), Italian mountaineer and writer nicknamed the "Spider of the Dolomites"
- Peter Everitt (born 1974), Australian rules footballer nicknamed "Spida"
- Neil Giraldo (born 1955), American guitar musician nicknamed "Spyder"
- Spider-Man (nickname)
