= List of accolades received by Marvel's Spider-Man =

Awards received by the 2018 video game Marvel's Spider-Man

Accolades
Award	Won	Nominated
Annie Awards	0	1
British Academy Games Awards	0	3
D.I.C.E. Awards	1	11
Game Audio Network Guild Awards	1	6
The Game Awards	0	8
Game Critics Awards	2	3
Game Developers Choice Awards	0	6
Gamers' Choice Awards	3	7
Gamescom	1	2
Golden Joystick Awards	0	5
Harvey Awards	0	1
Hollywood Music in Media Awards	0	1
Italian Video Game Awards	0	4
Japan Game Awards	1	1
New York Game Awards	0	2
Nickelodeon Kids' Choice Awards	0	1
SXSW Gaming Awards	2	8
Visual Effects Society Awards	0	2
Writers Guild of America Awards	0	1
- Total number of awards and nominations
Total	11	73
- Footnotes

Marvel's Spider-Man is a 2018 action-adventure game developed by Insomniac Games and published by Sony Interactive Entertainment. Based on the Marvel Comics superhero Spider-Man, it is inspired by the long-running comic book mythology and adaptations in other media. Set in New York City, players follow Spider-Man trying to stop the super-human crime lord Mister Negative from releasing a deadly virus across the city while dealing with the personal problems of his civilian persona, Peter Parker. When the game was announced in June 2016, it was widely anticipated. The game was nominated for Most Wanted Game at the Golden Joystick Awards in 2016 and 2017, as well as for Most Anticipated Game at The Game Awards 2017.

It was released worldwide on September 7, 2018, for the PlayStation 4. Spider-Man received "generally favorable reviews" from critics, according to review aggregator Metacritic with a score of 87 from 116 reviews; it was Metacritic's thirteenth highest-scoring PlayStation 4 game of 2018. (Note: It was Metacritic's joint thirteenth highest-scoring PlayStation 4 game of 2018 alongside Street Fighter V: Arcade Edition, Sonic Mania Plus and Dragon Ball FighterZ with a score of 87.) Spider-Man sold 3.3 million units in its first three days of release, making it the fastest-selling second-party video game release in Sony's history, narrowly beating 2018's God of War's 3.1 million. USA Today estimated the game made at least US$198 million during this period, surpassing the $117 million North-American opening-weekend box office take of the 2017 film Spider-Man: Homecoming. By November 2018, it became the fastest-selling superhero game in the United States. By August 2019, Spider-Man had sold over 13.2 million physical and digital units worldwide making it one of the best-selling PlayStation 4 games.

Spider-Man garnered awards and nominations in a variety of categories with particular praise for its story, characters, performances, and music. At the Gamers' Choice Awards 2018, the game received eight nominations and went on to win three awards: Fan Favorite Action Game, Fan Favorite Single Player Gaming Experience, and Fan Favorite Character of the Year for Yuri Lowenthal as Peter Parker / Spider-Man. At the National Academy of Video Game Trade Reviewers Awards the game received twenty-one nominations and went on to win three awards for Engineering; Game, Franchise Action; and Performance in a Drama, Supporting for Laura Bailey as Mary Jane Watson. At the 22nd Annual D.I.C.E. Awards, the game earned eleven nominations and won the award for Outstanding Achievement in Animation. At the SXSW Gaming Awards 2019, Spider-Man earned eight nominations and won the Excellence in Animation and Excellence in Convergence awards, and at the Game Critics Awards 2018 it garnered three nominations and won two awards: Best Console Game and Best Action/Adventure Game.

Spider-Man appeared on several lists of the top video games of 2018, being ranked in first place by Wired; second place by Apple Daily and Time; third place by Complex, Push Square, and Zero Punctuation; fifth place by Electronic Gaming Monthly; seventh place by GamesRadar+ and Giant Bomb; ninth place by Polygon and USgamer; and tenth place by The Daily Telegraph. Shacknews and The Verge named it "Game of the Year" and it was nominated for Game of the Year by Eurogamer, GameSpot, and IGN. A poll of 128 Japanese game developers by Famitsu magazine named Spider-Man as their game of the year.

== Accolades ==
Award	Date	Category	Recipient(s) and nominee(s)	Result	Ref(s).
Annie Awards	February 2, 2019	Character Animation in a Video Game	Marvel's Spider-Man	Nominated	
British Academy Games Awards	April 4, 2019	Artistic Achievement	Marvel's Spider-Man	Nominated	
British Academy Games Awards	April 4, 2019	Audio Achievement	Marvel's Spider-Man	Nominated	
British Academy Games Awards	April 4, 2019	Narrative	Marvel's Spider-Man	Nominated	
D.I.C.E. Awards	February 14, 2019	Game of the Year	Scott Michalek, Bryan Intihar, Ryan Smith	Nominated	
D.I.C.E. Awards	February 14, 2019	Adventure Game of the Year	Scott Michalek, Bryan Intihar, Ryan Smith	Nominated	
D.I.C.E. Awards	February 14, 2019	Outstanding Achievement in Game Direction	Bryan Intihar, Ryan Smith	Nominated	
D.I.C.E. Awards	February 14, 2019	Outstanding Achievement in Game Design	Cameron Christian	Nominated	
D.I.C.E. Awards	February 14, 2019	Outstanding Achievement in Animation	Bobby Coddington	Won	
D.I.C.E. Awards	February 14, 2019	Outstanding Achievement in Art Direction	Jacinda Chew	Nominated	
D.I.C.E. Awards	February 14, 2019	Outstanding Achievement in Character	Peter Parker/Spider-Man - Yuri Lowenthal, Jon Paquette, Christos Gage, Ben Arfmann	Nominated	
D.I.C.E. Awards	February 14, 2019	Outstanding Achievement in Original Music Composition	John Paesano	Nominated	
D.I.C.E. Awards	February 14, 2019	Outstanding Achievement in Sound Design	Dwight Okahara, Paul Mudra	Nominated	
D.I.C.E. Awards	February 14, 2019	Outstanding Achievement in Story	Jon Paquette, Christos Gage, Ben Arfmann	Nominated	
D.I.C.E. Awards	February 14, 2019	Outstanding Technical Achievement	Cameron Christian, Gil Doron	Nominated	
Game Audio Network Guild Awards	March 21, 2019	Audio of the Year	Marvel's Spider-Man	Nominated	
Game Audio Network Guild Awards	March 21, 2019	Sound Design of the Year	Marvel's Spider-Man	Nominated	
Game Audio Network Guild Awards	March 21, 2019	Best Interactive Score	Marvel's Spider-Man	Nominated	
Game Audio Network Guild Awards	March 21, 2019	Best Cinematic Cutscene Audio	Marvel's Spider-Man	Nominated	
Game Audio Network Guild Awards	March 21, 2019	Best Dialogue	Marvel's Spider-Man	Won	
Game Audio Network Guild Awards	March 21, 2019	Best Original Instrumental	"Spider-Man"	Nominated	
The Game Awards	December 7, 2017	Most Anticipated Game	Marvel's Spider-Man	Nominated	
The Game Awards	December 6, 2018	Game of the Year	Marvel's Spider-Man	Nominated	
The Game Awards	December 6, 2018	Best Game Direction	Marvel's Spider-Man	Nominated	
The Game Awards	December 6, 2018	Best Narrative	Marvel's Spider-Man	Nominated	
The Game Awards	December 6, 2018	Best Score/Music	Marvel's Spider-Man	Nominated	
The Game Awards	December 6, 2018	Best Audio Design	Marvel's Spider-Man	Nominated	
The Game Awards	December 6, 2018	Best Performance	Yuri Lowenthal as Peter Parker / Spider-Man	Nominated	
The Game Awards	December 6, 2018	Best Action/Adventure Game	Marvel's Spider-Man	Nominated	
Game Critics Awards	July 5, 2018	Best of Show	Marvel's Spider-Man	Nominated	
Game Critics Awards	July 5, 2018	Best Console Game	Marvel's Spider-Man	Won	
Game Critics Awards	July 5, 2018	Best Action/Adventure Game	Marvel's Spider-Man	Won	
Game Developers Choice Awards	March 20, 2019	Best Audio	Marvel's Spider-Man	Nominated	
Game Developers Choice Awards	March 20, 2019	Best Design	Marvel's Spider-Man	Nominated	
Game Developers Choice Awards	March 20, 2019	Best Narrative	Marvel's Spider-Man	Nominated	
Game Developers Choice Awards	March 20, 2019	Best Technology	Marvel's Spider-Man	Nominated	
Game Developers Choice Awards	March 20, 2019	Best Visual Art	Marvel's Spider-Man	Nominated	
Game Developers Choice Awards	March 20, 2019	Game of the Year	Marvel's Spider-Man	Nominated	
Gamers' Choice Awards	December 9, 2018	Fan Favorite Game	Marvel's Spider-Man	Nominated	
Gamers' Choice Awards	December 9, 2018	Fan Favorite Action Game	Marvel's Spider-Man	Won	
Gamers' Choice Awards	December 9, 2018	Fan Favorite Single Player Gaming Experience	Marvel's Spider-Man	Won	
Gamers' Choice Awards	December 9, 2018	Fan Favorite Character of the Year	Peter Parker / Spider-Man	Won	
Gamers' Choice Awards	December 9, 2018	Fan Favorite Male Voice Actor	Yuri Lowenthal as Peter Parker / Spider-Man	Nominated	
Gamers' Choice Awards	December 9, 2018	Fan Favorite Female Voice Actor	Laura Bailey as Mary Jane Watson	Nominated	
Gamers' Choice Awards	December 9, 2018	Fan Favorite Female Voice Actor	Tara Platt as Yuri Watanabe	Nominated	
Gamescom	August 21, 2018	Best Action Game	Marvel's Spider-Man	Nominated	
Gamescom	August 21, 2018	Best PlayStation 4 Game	Marvel's Spider-Man	Won	
Golden Joystick Awards	November 18, 2016	Most Wanted Game	Marvel's Spider-Man	Nominated	
Golden Joystick Awards	November 17, 2017	Most Wanted Game	Marvel's Spider-Man	Nominated	
Golden Joystick Awards	November 16, 2018	Best Storytelling	Marvel's Spider-Man	Nominated	
Golden Joystick Awards	November 16, 2018	PlayStation Game of the Year	Marvel's Spider-Man	Nominated	
Golden Joystick Awards	November 16, 2018	Ultimate Game of the Year	Marvel's Spider-Man	Nominated	
Harvey Awards	October 4, 2019	Best Adaptation From a Comic	Marvel's Spider-Man	Nominated	
Hollywood Music in Media Awards	November 14, 2018	Original Score – Video Game	Marvel's Spider-Man	Nominated	
Italian Video Game Awards	April 11, 2019	People's Choice	Marvel's Spider-Man	Nominated	
Italian Video Game Awards	April 11, 2019	Game of the Year	Marvel's Spider-Man	Nominated	
Italian Video Game Awards	April 11, 2019	Best Game Design	Marvel's Spider-Man	Nominated	
Italian Video Game Awards	April 11, 2019	Best Character	Peter Parker / Spider-Man	Nominated	
Japan Game Awards	September 12, 2019	Award for Excellence	Marvel's Spider-Man	Won	
New York Game Awards	January 22, 2019	Big Apple Award for Best Game of the Year	Marvel's Spider-Man	Nominated	
New York Game Awards	January 22, 2019	Great White Way Award for Best Acting in a Game	Laura Bailey as Mary Jane Watson	Nominated	
Nickelodeon Kids' Choice Awards	March 23, 2019	Favorite Video Game	Marvel's Spider-Man	Nominated	
SXSW Gaming Awards	March 16, 2019	Excellence in Art	Marvel's Spider-Man	Nominated	
SXSW Gaming Awards	March 16, 2019	Excellence in Animation	Marvel's Spider-Man	Won	
SXSW Gaming Awards	March 16, 2019	Excellence in Gameplay	Marvel's Spider-Man	Nominated	
SXSW Gaming Awards	March 16, 2019	Excellence in Technical Achievement	Marvel's Spider-Man	Nominated	
SXSW Gaming Awards	March 16, 2019	Excellence in Narrative	Marvel's Spider-Man	Nominated	
SXSW Gaming Awards	March 16, 2019	Excellence in Convergence	Marvel's Spider-Man	Won	
SXSW Gaming Awards	March 16, 2019	Trending Game of the Year	Marvel's Spider-Man	Nominated	
SXSW Gaming Awards	March 16, 2019	Video Game of the Year	Marvel's Spider-Man	Nominated	
Visual Effects Society Awards	February 5, 2019	Outstanding Animated Character in an Episode or Real-Time Project	Otto Octavius / Doctor Octopus	Nominated	
Visual Effects Society Awards	February 5, 2019	Outstanding Visual Effects in a Real-Time Project	Marvel's Spider-Man	Nominated	
Writers Guild of America Awards	February 17, 2019	Outstanding Achievement in Videogame Writing	Marvel's Spider-Man	Nominated	

== Other awards ==
Spider-Man received a range of awards and nominations from media publications and other game awards shows.

=== Best Game awards and nominations ===
Spider-Man appeared on several lists of the top video games of 2018, being ranked in first place by Wired; second place by Apple Daily, Hot Press, Maxim, Stuff, Time, and Troy Daily News; third place by Complex, France Info, Igromania, Morning Star, Push Square, The Ringer, and Zero Punctuation; fourth place by Gry Online, The Michigan Daily, National Post, and NRK P3; fifth place by Electronic Gaming Monthly, Libertad Digital, and Vulture; sixth place by IGN Italy and Rolling Stone Italy; seventh place by GamesRadar+, Giant Bomb, Knack Focus, The Mercury News, and The Star; eighth place by HuffPost Brazil; ninth place by Polygon and USgamer; and tenth place by The Daily Telegraph. Shacknews and The Verge named it "Game of the Year" and it was nominated for Game of the Year by CNews, Eurogamer, Fox Sports Asia, GameSpot, IGN, and news.com.au. A poll of 128 Japanese game developers by Famitsu magazine named Spider-Man as their game of the year.

=== Other categories ===
==== Game award shows ====
The Australian Games Awards and Brazil Game Awards nominated Marvel's Spider-Man for both Action/Adventure Title of the Year and Game of the Year. The Brazil Game Awards also nominated it for Best Original Game, Best Console Game, Best Soundtrack, Best Voice Acting in Portuguese, and Insomniac was nominated for Best Studio. The Global Game Awards nominated it for Game of the Year (sixth), Best Action (second), Best Open World (third), Best Visuals (fourth), in addition Insomniac won Best Developer. At the New York Game Awards the game was nominated for The Big Apple Award for Best Game of the Year and Laura Bailey's portrayal of Mary Jane Watson gave her a nomination for Great White Way Award for Best Acting in a Game.

The game was nominated for 22 categories and won three at the National Academy of Video Game Trade Reviewers Awards 17 of these were: Game of the Year; Animation, Artistic; Animation, Technical; Art Direction, Contemporary; Camera Direction in a Game Engine; Character Design; Control Design; Costume Design; Design, Franchise; Direction in a Game Cinema; Graphics, Technical; Lighting/Texturing; Original Dramatic Score, Franchise; Sound Editing in a Game Cinema; Sound Effects; Writing in a Drama. In addition, it won the awards for Game, Franchise Action and Engineering. Also it received nominations for its voice actors including: Performance in a Drama, Lead (Yuri Lowenthal as Peter Parker / Spider-Man); Performance in a Drama, Supporting (Laura Bailey as Mary Jane Watson); Performance in a Drama, Supporting (William Saylers as Otto Octavius / Doctor Octopus). Bailey went on to win her nomination.

==== Media publications ====
It received a "Silver" award (equivalent to third place) by PlayStation Blog in the following categories: Best Narrative, Best Graphical Showcase, Best Sound Design, Best Soundtrack, Best Performance, Best PlayStation 4 Game. It also received a "Gold" award (equivalent to second place) by PlayStation Blog for Best PlayStation Console Exclusive. Its developer, Insomniac Games, received a "Silver" award for Studio of the Year.

Spider-Man won Best Game Narrative from Digital Trends and was nominated for Best Story by Giant Bomb. Additionally, it was nominated for Best Video Game Story as well as Best PlayStation 4 Game and Best Action-Adventure Game by IGN. It was a runner-up in four categories by IGN Australia these are: Best Audio Design, Best Game Design, Best Storytelling, and Game of the Year. It was nominated for four awards by The Games Machine these are: Best Action Game, Best Open World, Game of the Year, Tell Me a Story. (Note: Awarded to a game with outstanding narrative.) It won the award for Best Action/Adventure Game by Inner Circle Games Network. It won an Excellence Prize from Famitsu Awards.

== Bibliography ==
- Adams, Robert N. (December 28, 2018). "Japanese Developers Vote Spider-Man PS4 Game of the Year". Game Revolution.
- Andronico, Michael (October 26, 2018). "Golden Joystick Awards: Vote for Ultimate Game of the Year". Tom's Guide. Future plc. Archived from the original on November 14, 2018.
- "【2018必玩遊戲】" [2018 must play games]. Apple Daily (in Chinese). Next Digital. January 4, 2019.
- "Your 2018 Winners". Australian Games Awards. December 19, 2018. Archived from the original on January 12, 2019.
- Baccigalupi, Mario (December 17, 2018). "TGM Awards 2018: ecco le nostre nomination" [TGM Awards 2018: here are our nominations]. The Games Machine (in Italian). Aktia srl. Archived from the original on July 15, 2019.
- Barter, Pavel (December 11, 2018). "Hot Press' Top Games of 2018". Hot Press. Archived from the original on October 22, 2019.
- Blumenthal, Eli (September 20, 2018). "Marvel's 'Spider-Man' for PlayStation 4 swings to a record-breaking opening". USA Today. Archived from the original on October 5, 2018.
- Brian (April 5, 2019). "Famitsu Award 2018 winners announced – Smash Bros. wins Game of the Year, Sakurai named MVP, more – Nintendo Everything". nintendoeverything.com. Archived from the original on April 5, 2019.
- Brian (September 12, 2019). "Japan Game Awards 2019 results announced, Smash Bros. Ultimate wins big – Nintendo Everything". nintendoeverything.com. Archived from the original on December 5, 2019.
- Brown, Josh (January 17, 2019). "2018's top 5 video games". Troy Daily News. AIM Media Midwest.
- Cacho, Gieson (December 20, 2018). "The top 10 video games of 2018 were …". The Mercury News. Digital First Media. Archived from the original on December 21, 2018.
- Cailleaud, Nicolas (January 4, 2019). "Les 26 meilleurs jeux vidéo de 2018" [The 26 best video games of 2018]. CNews (in French). MatinPlus SA. Archived from the original on May 6, 2019.
- Chalk, Andy (November 17, 2017). "Here are your 2017 Golden Joystick Award winners". PC Gamer. Future plc. Archived from the original on June 2, 2019.
- Coclite, Andrea; Bonaldi, Mario (December 28, 2018). "I 10 migliori videogame del 2018" [The 10 best videogames of 2018]. Rolling Stone Italy (in Italian). Penske Media Corporation. Archived from the original on March 31, 2019.
- Cowles, Ben (December 10, 2018). "Best of 2018: Video games". Morning Star. People's Press Printing Society. Archived from the original on October 26, 2019.
- Craddock, Ryan (September 13, 2019). "Super Smash Bros. Ultimate Dominates The Japan Game Awards 2019". Nintendo Life. Archived from the original on September 13, 2019.
- Croshaw, Ben "Yahtzee" (January 2, 2019). "2018's Best Worst and Blandest". The Escapist. Archived from the original on March 29, 2019.
- Dewever, Dimitri (December 22, 2018). "Dit zijn de beste games van 2018 volgens Knack Focus" [These are the best games of 2018 according to Knack Focus]. Knack Focus (in Dutch). Roularta. Archived from the original on January 23, 2019.
- Dietz, Jason (January 2, 2019). "Best Video Games of 2018". Metacritic. CBS Interactive. Archived from the original on September 18, 2019.
- Dornbush, Jonathon (September 4, 2018). "Spider-Man PS4 Review". IGN. Ziff Davis. Archived from the original on September 22, 2018.
- Drouard, Elodie; Godon, Pierre; Comin, Jérôme (December 18, 2018). "Les cinq jeux vidéo qui nous ont marqués en 2018" [The five video games that marked us in 2018]. France Info (in French). France Télévisions. Archived from the original on June 19, 2019.
- "EGM's Best of 2018 Part Five: #5 ~ #1". Electronic Gaming Monthly. EGM Media, LLC. January 1, 2019.
- Espineli, Matt (April 30, 2019). "Game Of The Year: 2018's 10 Best Games". GameSpot. CBS Interactive. Archived from the original on December 20, 2018.
- "The 30 best games of 2018". Eurogamer. Gamer Network. December 30, 2018.
- Fitzpatrick, Alex; Dockterman, Eliana; Austin, Patrick Lucas (November 16, 2018). "The 10 Best Video Games of 2018". Time.
- Flores, Terry (December 3, 2018). "'Incredibles 2', 'Ralph Breaks the Internet' Top Annie Awards Nominations". Variety. Penske Media Corporation. Archived from the original on December 18, 2018.
- Fogel, Stefanie (March 14, 2019). "'God of War', 'Red Dead 2' Lead BAFTA Game Awards Nominations". Variety. Penske Media Corporation. Archived from the original on December 5, 2019.
- Fogel, Stefanie (March 21, 2019). "'God of War' Wins Six G.A.N.G. Awards, Including Audio of the Year". Variety. Penske Media Corporation. Archived from the original on July 17, 2019.
- "5 Best video games of 2018". Fox Sports Asia. Fox Networks Group Asia Pacific. January 1, 2019. Archived from the original on January 7, 2019.
- "Titanium Awards 2018". Fun & Serious Game Festival. Archived from the original on July 7, 2019.
- "Global Game Awards 2018". Game Debate. December 7, 2018. Archived from the original on January 5, 2018.
- "2018 Gamers' Choice Awards". Gamers' Choice Awards. December 9, 2018. Archived from the original on January 3, 2019.
- "The best games of 2018". GamesRadar+. Future plc. December 21, 2018. p. 3. Archived from the original on December 25, 2018.
- Gerstmann, Jeff (December 28, 2018). "Here's What Won". Giant Bomb. CBS Interactive. Archived from the original on December 29, 2018.
- Good, Owen S. (January 4, 2019). "Red Dead Redemption 2 tops list of Game Developers Choice nominees". Polygon. Vox Media. Archived from the original on January 5, 2019.
- Grant, Christopher (December 6, 2018). "The Game Awards 2018: Here are all the winners". Polygon. Vox Media. Archived from the original on December 7, 2018.
- Handrahan, Matthew (December 10, 2018). "Red Dead Redemption 2 wins Best Game at Fun & Serious Festival Awards". GamesIndustry.biz. Gamer Network. Archived from the original on December 11, 2018.
- "2018 Music in Visual Media Nominations". Hollywood Music in Media Awards. Archived from the original on October 17, 2018.
- "2018 HMMA WINNERS". Hollywood Music in Media Awards. November 14, 2018. Archived from the original on November 15, 2018.
- Hoggins, Tom (October 27, 2017). "Public voting and the nominations for the 2017 Golden Joystick Awards are now up". The Daily Telegraph.
- Hoggins, Tom (September 24, 2018). "Golden Joysticks 2018 nominees announced, voting open now". The Daily Telegraph. Archived from the original on October 11, 2018.
- Hoggins, Tom (December 18, 2018). "Games of 2018: Marvel's Spider-Man was a super-powered swinging treat". The Daily Telegraph.
- "Best Game of the Year 2018". IGN. Ziff Davis. December 10, 2018. Archived from the original on April 5, 2019.
- "Best PlayStation 4 Game of 2018". IGN. Ziff Davis. December 10, 2018. Archived from the original on April 6, 2019.
- "Best Action-Adventure Game of 2018". IGN. Ziff Davis. December 10, 2019. Archived from the original on April 6, 2019.
- "Best Video Game Story of 2018". IGN. Ziff Davis. December 10, 2019. Archived from the original on April 6, 2019.
- "Select Awards 2018". IGN. Ziff Davis. March 4, 2019. Archived from the original on October 22, 2019.
- "Italian Video Game Awards Nominees and Winners". Italian Video Game Awards. April 11, 2019. Archived from the original on August 24, 2018.
- Keyes, Rob (January 3, 2019). "2018 New York Game Awards Nominees Revealed". Screen Rant. Archived from the original on January 5, 2019.
- Khan, Zarmena (March 17, 2019). "God of War Takes Home 'Game of the Year' at SXSW 2019 Gaming Awards". PlayStation LifeStyle. Evolve Media. Archived from the original on April 4, 2019.
- Kuchera, Ben (December 11, 2018). "GOTY 2018: #9 Marvel's Spider-Man". Polygon. Vox Media.
- Lagumbay, Emmanuel (February 14, 2019). "2019 G.A.N.G. Awards Finalists". Game Audio Network Guild. Archived from the original on February 17, 2019.
- Levin, Lev; Shepelyov, Dmitriy; Pavlushkin, Denis (January 21, 2019). "Игра года. Marvel's Spider-Man, God of War, Red Dead Redemption 2" [Game of the Year. Marvel's Spider-Man, God of War, Red Dead Redemption 2]. Igromania (in Russian). Igromedia. Archived from the original on May 11, 2019.
- "Estos son los cinco mejores juegos de 2018" [These are the five best games of 2018]. Libertad Digital (in Spanish). December 27, 2018. Archived from the original on December 28, 2018.
- Loggia, Gianluca (December 25, 2018). "Best Games of 2018: #6 – Spider-Man". IGN Italy (in Italian). Ziff Davis. Archived from the original on December 5, 2019.
- Loveridge, Sam (September 15, 2016). "Golden Joystick Awards 2016 voting now open to the public". Digital Spy. Archived from the original on February 28, 2017.
- Lustig, Eli (January 9, 2019). "Top 5 video games of 2018". The Michigan Daily. University of Michigan. Archived from the original on October 27, 2019.
- Makuch, Eddie (December 8, 2017). "The Game Awards 2017 Winners Headlined By Zelda: Breath Of The Wild's Game Of The Year". GameSpot. CBS Interactive. Archived from the original on December 9, 2017.
- Makuch, Eddie (January 10, 2019). "God Of War, Spider-Man Lead DICE Awards; Here's All The Nominees". GameSpot. CBS Interactive. Archived from the original on January 11, 2019.
- Marsh, Calum (December 24, 2018). "From Fortnite to Red Dead Redemption 2, the 10 best video games of the year". National Post. Postmedia Network.
- Massongill, Justin (January 17, 2019). "Game of the Year 2018: The Winners". PlayStation.Blog. Archived from the original on January 18, 2019.
- Mateo, Alex (April 7, 2019). "Famitsu Awards Honor Super Smash Bros. Ultimate, Monster Hunter: World, Masahiro Sakurai". Anime News Network.
- "Marvel's Spider-Man for PlayStation 4 Reviews". Metacritic. Archived from the original on September 22, 2018.
- McWhertor, Michael (February 14, 2019). "God of War wins big at DICE Awards 2019". Polygon. Vox Media.
- Mejia, Ozzie (December 31, 2018). "Shacknews Game of the Year 2018 – Marvel's Spider-Man". Shacknews.
- Mirowski, Jakub (January 6, 2019). "4. Marvel's Spider-Man – Najlepsze gry 2018 roku – wybór redakcji" [4. Marvel's Spider-Man – The best games of 2018 – editor's choice]. Gry Online (in Polish). Gry-Online S.A. Archived from the original on November 30, 2019.
- Muncy, Julie (December 30, 2018). "The 10 Best Games Of 2018—And Yes, They'Re Ranked". Wired. Archived from the original on December 31, 2018.
- "Winner list for 2018: God of War breaks record". National Academy of Video Game Trade Reviewers. March 13, 2019.
- Sheridan, Connor (November 18, 2016). "Overwatch scoops five awards, Firewatch wins Best Indie Game: Here are all the Golden Joystick 2016 winners". GamesRadar+. Future plc. Archived from the original on November 21, 2016.
- Newton, Casey (December 19, 2018). "Why Spider-Man is my game of the year". The Verge.
- Nordvik, Jorgen (December 18, 2018). "Årets beste spill" [Best game of the year]. NRK P3 (in Norwegian). NRK.
- Nordyke, Kimberly (March 23, 2019). "Kids' Choice Awards: Full List of Winners". The Hollywood Reporter. Archived from the original on March 25, 2019.
- O'Connor, James (June 14, 2016). "Insomniac Games is making a Spider-Man game". VG247. Archived from the original on November 16, 2018.
- Penilhas, Bruna (December 12, 2018). "Red Dead Redemption 2 é eleito Melhor Jogo do Ano no Brazil Game Awards 2018" [Red Dead Redemption 2 Named Best Game of the Year at Brazil Game Awards 2018]. IGN Brazil (in Portuguese). Ziff Davis. Archived from the original on October 19, 2019.
- Ramée, Jordan (August 15, 2018). "Gamescom 2018: Award Nominees Include Marvel's Spider-Man, Assassin's Creed Odyssey, And More". GameSpot. CBS Interactive.
- "The Best Video Games of 2018". The Ringer. December 10, 2018. Archived from the original on August 17, 2019.
- Sciarrino, John (December 17, 2018). "The 20 Best Video Games of 2018". Maxim. Biglari Holdings. Archived from the original on July 4, 2019.
- Smith, Matt (December 12, 2018). "The Best Video Games Released in 2018". Digital Trends. Designtechnica. Archived from the original on December 13, 2018.
- "'Red Dead Redemption 2', 'Monster Hunter World' among the best games of the year". The Star. Star Media Group Berhad. December 31, 2018. Archived from the original on December 31, 2018.
- "Best games of 2018". Stuff. Kelsey Media. December 21, 2018. Archived from the original on October 22, 2019.
- Swearingen, Jake (December 7, 2018). "The 10 Best Video Games of 2018". Vulture. New York Media. Archived from the original on December 28, 2018.
- Tailby, Stephen (December 30, 2018). "Game of the Year 2018: #3 – Marvel's Spider-Man". Push Square.
- Tapley, Kristopher (January 15, 2019). "'Avengers', 'Lost in Space', 'Ready Player One' Lead Visual Effects Society Nominations". Variety. Penske Media Corporation. Archived from the original on August 21, 2019.
- Tolbert, Samuel (December 29, 2018). "The Inner Circle Games Network – Game Awards 2018". The Inner Circle Games Network. Archived from the original on October 26, 2019.
- "USG's Top 20 Games of 2018". USGamer. Gamer Network. December 28, 2018. Archived from the original on December 21, 2018.
- Valentine, Rebekah (August 21, 2018). "Microsoft's Moon Studios, Activision Blizzard stand out in Gamescom Awards". GamesIndustry.biz. Gamer Network. Archived from the original on August 23, 2018.
- Valentine, Rebekah (August 19, 2019). "Sony acquires Insomniac Games". GamesIndustry.biz. Gamer Network. Archived from the original on August 19, 2019.
- Vasquez, Suriel (November 17, 2018). "CBS To Air Fan-Voted 'Gamers' Choice Awards' Next Month". Game Informer.
- Watts, Steve (July 2, 2018). "Resident Evil 2 Wins Top Honor In E3 Game Critics Awards". GameSpot. CBS Interactive. Archived from the original on August 3, 2018.
- "2019 Writers Guild Awards Screenplay and Videogame Writing Nominations Announced". Writers Guild of America West. January 7, 2019. Archived from the original on January 11, 2019.
- "WGA Awards: Full List of Nominations". The Hollywood Reporter. December 6, 2018.
- Wilson, Royce (December 14, 2018). "Game Of The Year — a tough call to choose the best of the best for 2018". news.com.au. News Corp Australia. Archived from the original on August 8, 2019.
- Workman, Robert (December 20, 2018). "'Marvel's Spider-Man' Becomes Fastest Selling Superhero Game of All Time". Comicbook. Archived from the original on December 22, 2018.
- Puc, Samantha (October 4, 2019). "NYCC '19: Presenting the 2019 Harvey Awards winners". Comics Beat. Archived from the original on January 2, 2020.
- Wong, Kevin (December 13, 2018). "The Best Video Games of 2018". Complex. Archived from the original on February 11, 2020.
