= Stephen Oyoung =

American actor

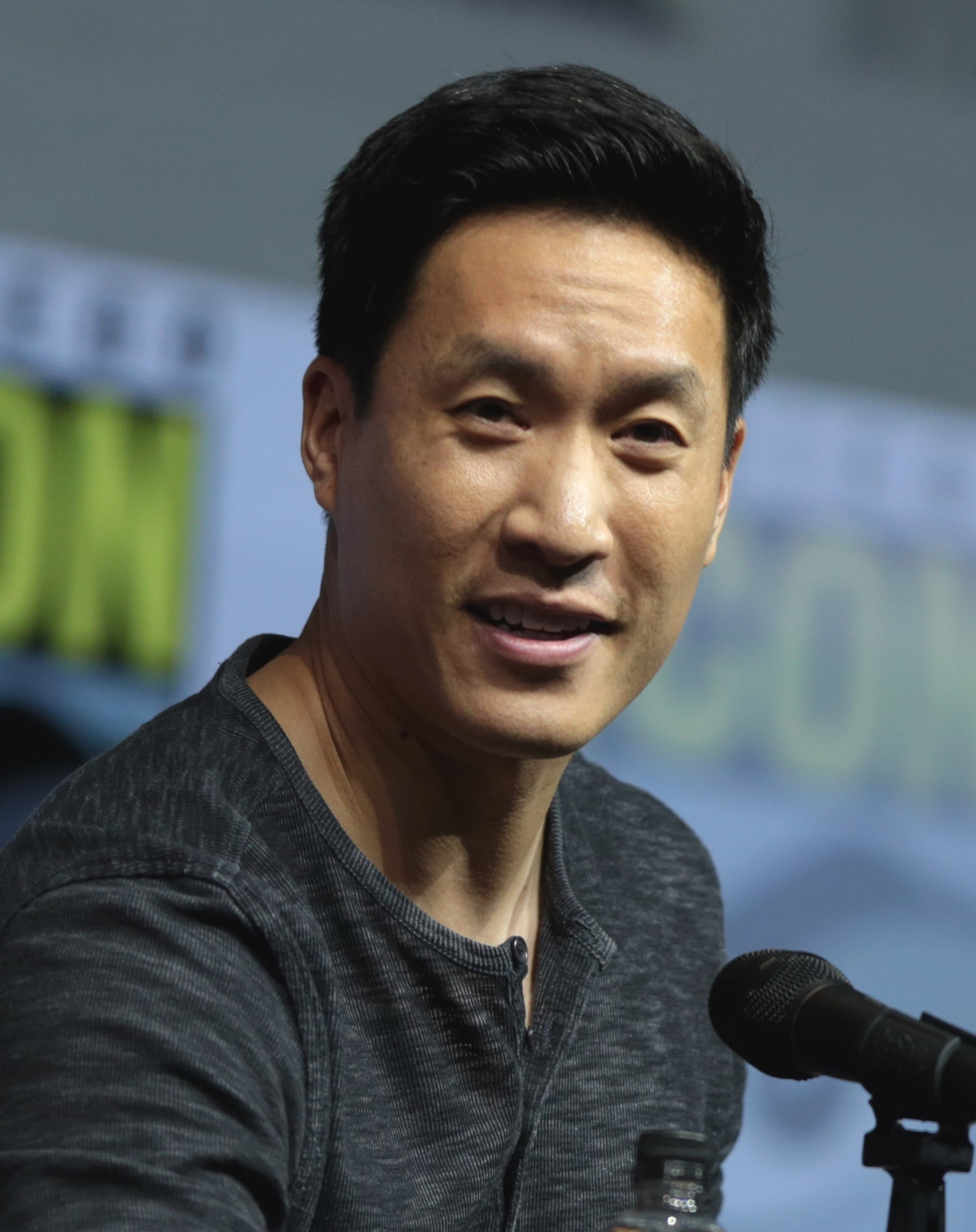
- Oyoung promoting Spider-Man at the 2018 San Diego Comic-Con
- Occupation: Actor
- Years active: 2007–present

Stephen Oyoung is an American actor best known for portraying Martin Li / Mister Negative in the 2018 video game Spider-Man and its 2023 sequel, and US Navy Dive Master "Pills" in Mission: Impossible – The Final Reckoning.

== Biography ==
His father taught him Wushu, becoming adept in it.

Before acting in films and television, Oyoung was a stunt performer and fight coordinator. He has acted in films such as Twisters, Olympus Has Fallen and Sicario. He trained actors Keanu Reeves, Denzel Washington and Adam Driver for the films 47 Ronin, The Equalizer and Star Wars: The Force Awakens, respectively. He appeared on television in major shows such as HBO's Insecure, NCIS, Apple TV's For All Mankind, CSI: Las Vegas, and Netflix's Jupiter's Legacy. In video games, he portrayed a Jedi Master in Star Wars: The Old Republic, and gained more recognition as Martin Li / Mister Negative in the 2018 video game Spider-Man, a role he reprised in the 2023 sequel Spider-Man 2.

== Filmography ==
=== Film ===
Year	Title	Role	Notes
2012	Safe	Triad Laptop Soldier	
2012	Red Dawn	—N/a	Stunt performer
2013	Olympus Has Fallen	—N/a	Stunt performer
2013	47 Ronin	—N/a	Fight choreographer
2014	The Equalizer	—N/a	Fight choreographer
2015	Sicario	Delta Driver	
2015	Star Wars: The Force Awakens	—N/a	Sword trainer
2016	Deadpool	—N/a	Stunt performer
2016	Independence Day: Resurgence	Young Man	
2016	Rogue One	—N/a	Stunt performer
2018	Peppermint	—N/a	Fight Coordinator
2019	Paddleton	Chien	
2019	Terminator: Dark Fate	Tech Curtis	
2019	John Wick: Chapter 3 – Parabellum	Triad	
2024	Twisters	Mike	
2025	Mission: Impossible – The Final Reckoning	Pills	
2026	The Wrecking Crew	Akihiro	
2026	Batman: Knightfall-Part 1: Knightfall	Chen (voice)	Direct-to-Video

=== Television ===
Year	Title	Role	Notes
2015	Castle	Guard	Episode: "The Wrong Stuff"
2016	Scandal	Agent Miller	Episode: "The Fish Rots from the Head"
2016	NCIS	Navy Captain Andrew Hubbard	Episode: "Homefront"
2016	The Last Ship	Lau Hu	Recurring (season 3)
2016	Legends of Tomorrow	Tokugawa Iemitsu	Episode: "Shogun"
2017	Wet Hot American Summer: Ten Years Later	Agent Tom Simmons	2 episodes
2017	Hawaii Five-0	Paul Lazio	Episode: "Na La 'Ilio"
2017	NCIS: Los Angeles	Navy Commander James Miyazaki	Episode: "Assets"
2018	How to Get Away with Murder	E.R. Doctor	Episode: "He's Dead"
2018	Counterpart	Chang	Episode: "No Man's Land – Part Two"
2018	Marvel's Runaways	Mitch	2 episodes
2019	For All Mankind	Harrison Liu	2 episodes
2020	Insecure	Victor	Episode: "Lowkey Trippin'"
2021	Jupiter's Legacy	Barry Bishop / Tectonic	2 episodes
2021	Good Trouble	Ken Sung	Recurring role
2022	The Book of Boba Fett	Dokk Strassi (physical performance)	Episode: "Chapter 1: Stranger in a Strange Land"
2024	Tomb Raider: The Legend of Lara Croft	Boat Captain, Guide (voice)	
2024–2025	Star Wars: Skeleton Crew	Brutus (physical performance)	Recurring role
2026	Grey's Anatomy	Greg	Episode: "Strip That Down"

=== Video games ===
Year	Title	Role	Notes	Ref.
2018	Spider-Man	Martin Li / Mister Negative	Also provided motion capture and likeness	
2020	Fallout 76: Steel Dawn	Pierce		
2021	Ratchet & Clank: Rift Apart	Additional voices		
2021	No More Heroes III	Gold Joe / Sniping Lee / Takashi Miike		
2022	Ghostwire: Tokyo	KK		
2022	Gotham Knights	Jason Todd / Red Hood	Also provided mo-cap performance	
2023	Spider-Man 2	Martin Li / Mister Negative	Also provided mo-cap and likeness	
2023	Like a Dragon Gaiden: The Man Who Erased His Name	Additional voices		
2025	Death Stranding 2: On the Beach	Alex Weatherstone, PA System		
2027	Exodus	Jun Aslan (male)		
