= Marvel's Spider-Man (video game) =

2018 video game

Spider-Man
- Developer: Insomniac Games (Note: Ported to Windows by Nixxes Software)
- Publisher: Sony Interactive Entertainment
- Directors: Ryan Smith; Brian Horton; Bryan Intihar; Marcus Smith
- Programmer: Joe Valenzuela
- Artists: Jacinda Chew; Grant Hollis
- Writers: Jon Paquette; Benjamin Arfmann; Kelsey Beachum; Christos Gage
- Composer: John Paesano
- Series: Marvel's Spider-Man
- Platforms: PlayStation 4; PlayStation 5; Windows
- Release: PlayStation 4; September 7, 2018; PlayStation 5; November 12, 2020; Windows; August 12, 2022
- Genre: Action-adventure
- Mode: Single-player

Marvel's Spider-Man (Note: Also referred to as Spider-Man) is a 2018 action-adventure game developed by Insomniac Games and published by Sony Interactive Entertainment. The first installment in the Marvel's Spider-Man game series, it is based on the Marvel Comics character Spider-Man and tells an original narrative that is inspired by the long-running comic book mythology, while also drawing from various adaptations in other media. In the main story, the superhuman crime lord Mister Negative orchestrates a plot to seize control of New York City's criminal underworld. When Mister Negative threatens to release a deadly virus, Spider-Man must confront him and protect the city while dealing with the personal problems of his civilian persona, Peter Parker.

Players control Spider-Man from the third-person perspective, with the gameplay primarily focusing on his traversal and combat abilities. Spider-Man can freely move around New York City, interacting with characters, undertaking missions, and unlocking new gadgets and suits by progressing through the main story or completing tasks. Outside the story, the player is able to complete side missions to unlock additional content and collectible items. Combat focuses on chaining attacks together and using the environment and webs to incapacitate numerous foes while avoiding damage.

Development of Marvel's Spider-Man, the first licensed game by Insomniac in its then-22-year history, began in 2014 and took approximately four years. Insomniac was given the choice of using any character from Marvel's catalog to work on; Spider-Man was chosen both for his appeal to the employees and the similarities in traversal gameplay to their previous game Sunset Overdrive (2014). The game design took inspiration from the history of Spider-Man across all media. Insomniac wanted to tell an original story that was not linked to an existing property, creating a unique universe (known as Earth-1048) that has since appeared in novels, merchandise, and comics.

Marvel's Spider-Man was released for the PlayStation 4 on September 7, 2018 and received generally favourable reviews from critics with praise for its graphics, narrative, characterization, combat, musical score, and web-swinging traversal mechanics. It received a number of accolades including being named as one of the best superhero games ever made. It became one of the fastest-selling games of the year and the second best-selling PlayStation 4 game of all time. The game's success launched a new franchise for Insomniac and Sony which has since been accompanied by other games and tie-ins in other media. The game was followed by an expansion, The City That Never Sleeps, in late 2018. In November 2020, a remastered version of Marvel's Spider-Man was released for the PlayStation 5 alongside Marvel's Spider-Man: Miles Morales, a spin-off and continuation focused on Spider-Man's protégé Miles Morales. A sequel, Marvel's Spider-Man 2, was released in October 2023 for the PlayStation 5.

== Gameplay ==
Spider-Man can traverse the city freely, using his abilities and webs to move in any direction horizontally or vertically, circumventing obstacles without stopping. (0:12)

Marvel's Spider-Man is an open-world action-adventure game set in the borough of Manhattan in a fictionalized version of modern-day New York City. It is presented from a third-person perspective showing the playable character and allowing the camera to be rotated freely around them. The primary playable character is the superhero Spider-Man, who can navigate the world by jumping, using his web shooters to fire webs that allow him to swing between buildings, running along walls and automatically vaulting over obstacles. Webs can be precisely aimed to pull the player towards specific points. Physical objects are required to attach webs to for swinging, and momentum and speed of the swing can be controlled by releasing the web at specific points to gain height or move more quickly. The game features an optional fast travel system that uses the New York City Subway system.

Combat is enacted using three buttons; one for dodging, one for physical strikes, and one for web-based attacks. Webbing can be used to incapacitate enemies and stick them to nearby objects, immediately removing them from battle. Enemies who are knocked from great heights are automatically stuck to a nearby surface in a web-cocoon, preventing death. Spider-Man can also use the environment to fight, jumping off walls and throwing objects like manhole covers, grenades and webbing-restrained enemies.

Successful and consecutive attacks build "Focus", which can be partially used to heal Spider-Man, while full Focus allows special finishing attacks to take down an enemy instantly. Spider-Man possesses "spider-sense", which is shown as a white icon around the character's head, indicating an incoming attack that can be dodged. A precise dodge performed just before the attack hits allows Spider-Man to retaliate with webbing against the enemy. Some enemies must be overcome using different approaches. Melee-weapon-wielding enemies must be knocked into the air and shielded enemies must be attacked from behind. Enemies armed with whips will drag Spider-Man out of the air and require a counterattack to fight effectively. Other types of enemy include heavily armored agents who can take more damage, brutes, and jetpack-wearing enemies who remain airborne.

Spider-Man has access to a variety of gadgets that can be deployed in combat; these include electric webbing, concussive blasts, and impact webbing that launches enemies backwards and can stick them to a nearby surface. Gadgets are unlocked by progressing through the game and can be accessed from a radial menu. Spider-Man has several unlockable suits that are based on existing versions of the character in media; there are also original suits created for the game. Many of these offer special abilities that can aid in combat, such as increasing Focus gain, reducing gravity, enhancing stealth, making the player invulnerable, and unleashing an electromagnetic pulse to disable enemy weapons. Once unlocked, suits and powers can be freely combined. Stealth combat involves Spider-Man moving around raised locations using gadgets or webbing to neutralize isolated enemies. Leveling up allows the player to unlock skills from three different specialties, focusing on ground combat, aerial combat, and traversal.

Suits, suit mods, gadgets, and their associated upgrades are purchased with resources called Tokens, which are awarded for completion of specific tasks. Each unlockable item requires different quantities of each Token type: Challenge Tokens for completing Taskmaster's time-and-skill based combat, stealth, and traversal missions; Backpack Tokens for locating Spider-Man's old backpacks containing mementos from his past; Research Tokens for completing research station missions, science minigames, and the collection of pigeons; Crime Tokens for stopping ambient crimes; Base Tokens for clearing out enemy bases; and Landmark Tokens for taking pictures of specific locations around the city. There are also minigames that are rewarded with experience points and research tokens including Circuit Puzzles that require the arrangement of an electric grid and Pattern Puzzles that require the recreation of a specific pattern using composite parts. Radio towers in different areas can be unscrambled, highlighting collectable objects, missions, and active crimes.

Some sections of the game are played as Spider-Man's alter-ego Peter Parker, his friend Mary Jane Watson, and ally Miles Morales. Peter's sections often involve puzzle-solving, while Mary Jane's and Miles' segments focus on the use of stealth to avoid enemies. The game originally featured three difficulty levels; Friendly (easy), Amazing (normal), and Spectacular (hard). A post-release update added a fourth "Ultimate" difficulty that increases enemy damage and health while decreasing Spider-Man's, and a "New Game Plus" option that allows the player to start a new game using all of the suits, powers, gadgets, and suit mods unlocked in a previous playthrough. The game includes accessibility options, enabling players to skip the puzzle minigames, enable larger subtitles, automatically complete quick time events, and replace button tapping with holding. A photo mode allows the player to take pictures of Spider-Man using a variety of image filters, frames, and stickers for customization. The camera can be used to take selfies and can be freely moved around Spider-Man to capture him in action.

== Synopsis ==
=== Characters and setting ===
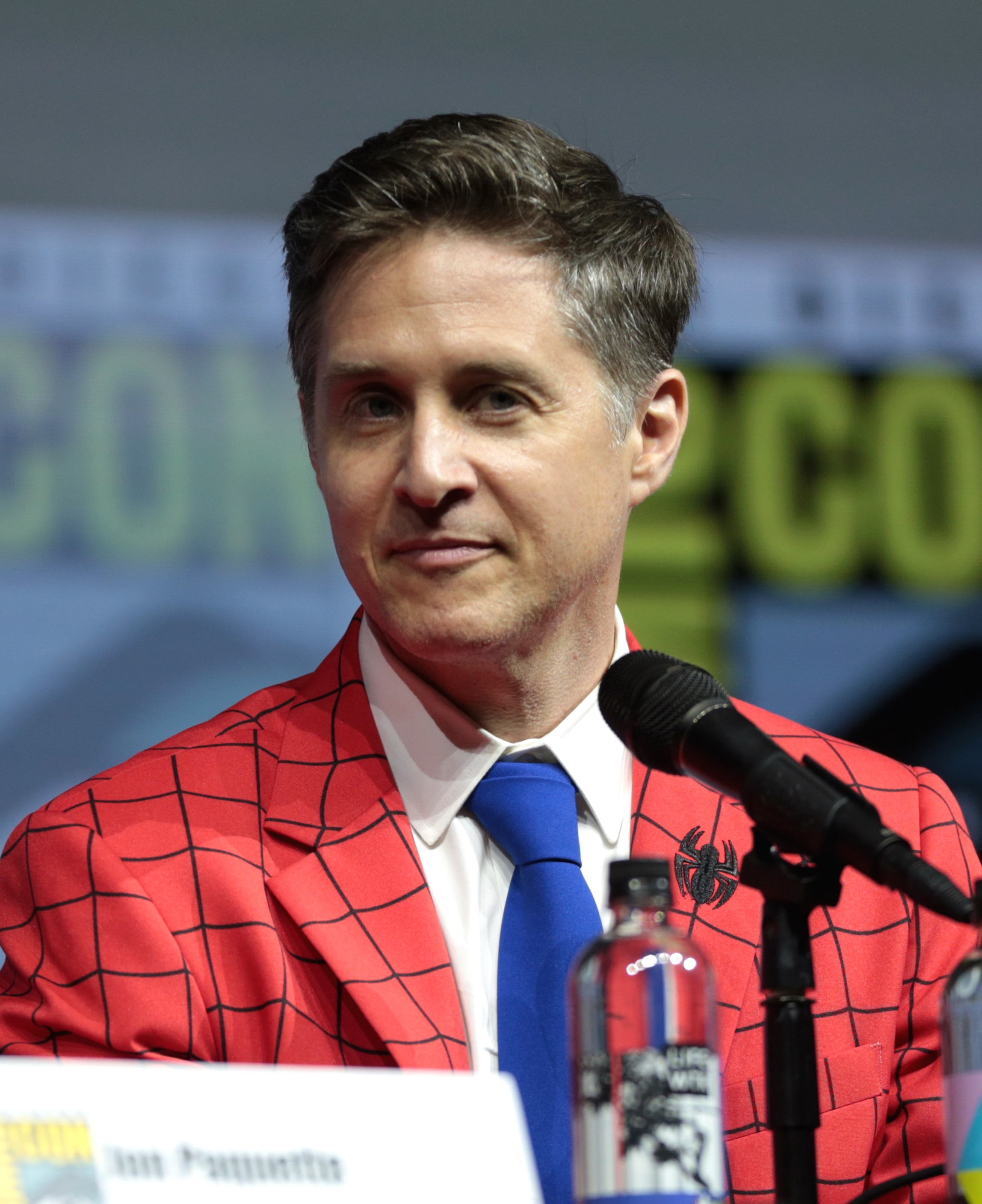
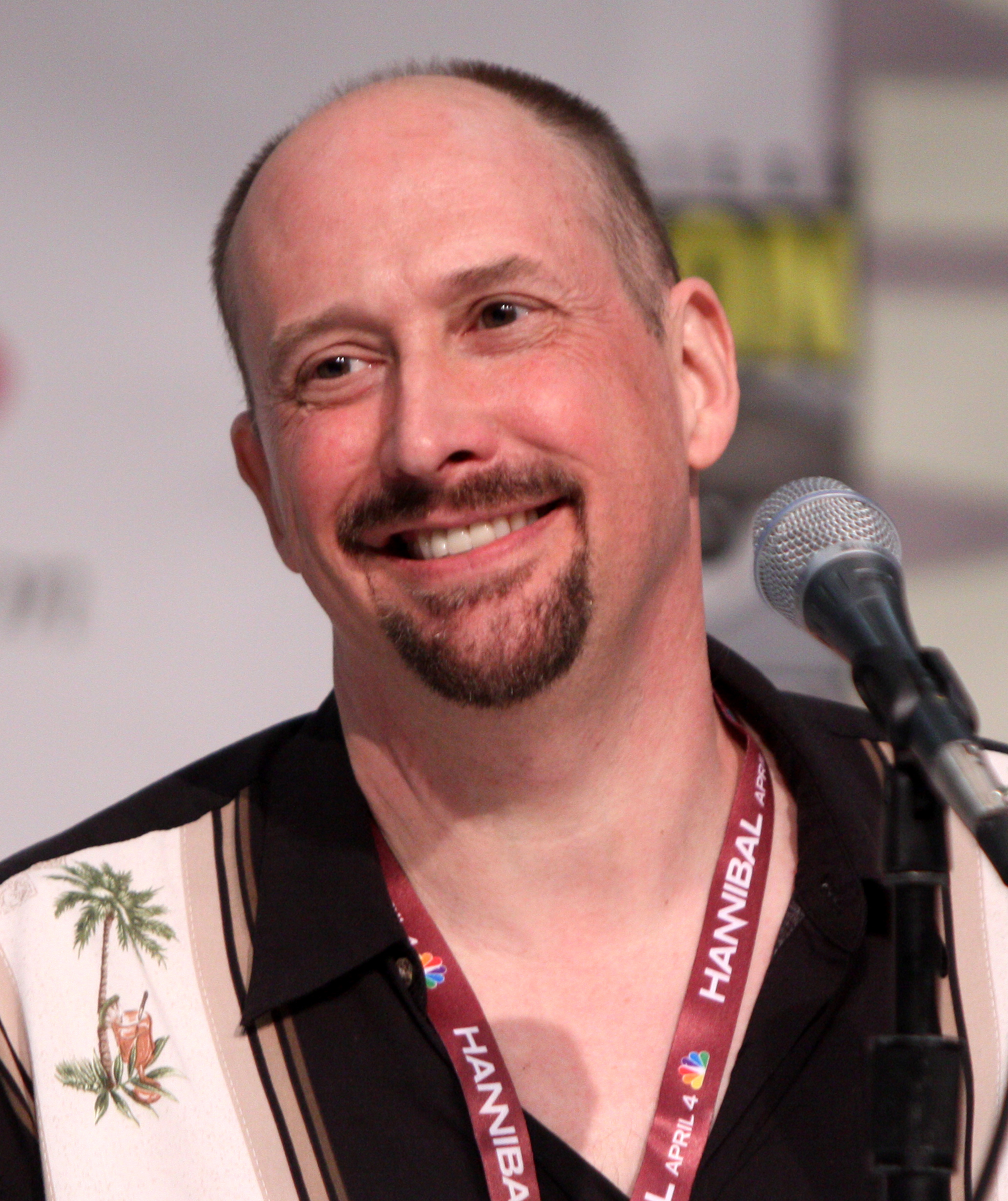
Yuri Lowenthal in 2018 (left) and William Salyers in 2013. They voiced Peter Parker / Spider-Man and Dr. Otto Octavius / Doctor Octopus, respectively.

Marvel's Spider-Man features a large ensemble cast of characters drawn from the history of Spider-Man comics. Peter Parker (voiced by Yuri Lowenthal) is a 23-year-old research assistant, who gains superhuman abilities after being bitten by a genetically modified spider. Assuming a secret identity as the superhero Spider-Man, Peter uses these abilities to protect the residents of New York City. Eight years into his superhero career, Peter has become an experienced crime fighter but struggles to balance his superhero and personal lives. Peter is assisted by Daily Bugle reporter Mary Jane Watson (Laura Bailey), his ex-girlfriend, and NYPD captain Yuri Watanabe (Tara Platt). In his civilian life, Peter is supported by his Aunt May (Nancy Linari) who volunteers at the F.E.A.S.T. homeless shelter run by philanthropist Martin Li (Stephen Oyoung). Peter is employed by his friend and mentor, the respected scientist Dr. Otto Octavius (William Salyers).

Spider-Man's adventure brings him into contact with other characters, including Miles Morales (Nadji Jeter) and his parents, NYPD officer Jefferson Davis (Russell Richardson) and Rio Morales (Jacqueline Pinol), Oscorp CEO and New York City mayor Norman Osborn (Mark Rolston), and Silver Sable (Nichole Elise), leader of the private military company Sable International. Spider-Man's mission brings him into conflict with several supervillains, beginning with his longtime foe and Kingpin of crime in New York Wilson Fisk (Travis Willingham), and a supernaturally powered gang called the Inner Demons who begin dividing the city for Mister Negative, who can corrupt people through his touch. Spider-Man must also confront Electro (Josh Keaton), Rhino (Fred Tatasciore), Scorpion (Jason Spisak), Vulture (Dwight Schultz), Shocker (Dave B. Mitchell), Taskmaster (Brian Bloom), Screwball (Stephanie Lemelin), and Tombstone (Corey Jones).

Several other characters—including Peter and Mary Jane's childhood friend Harry Osborn (Scott Porter), who is supposed to be vacationing in Europe, and anti-Spider-Man podcast host J. Jonah Jameson (Darin De Paul)—have voice roles in the main game. Spider-Man co-creator Stan Lee appears in a cameo role as a short-order cook. The game's downloadable content features appearances by master-thief Black Cat (Erica Lindbeck), Maggia mobster Hammerhead (Keith Silverstein), and Felicia's father Walter Hardy (Daniel Riordan).

Marvel's Spider-Man depicts fictional locations and entities from the Marvel Comics universe, including Avengers Tower, the Wakandan Embassy, the Symkarian Embassy, the Sanctum Sanctorum, the law offices of Nelson and Murdock, Alias Investigations, Rand Enterprises, the superhero cleanup company Damage Control, the Roxxon Energy Corporation, and Empire State University. It also features real-world locations including the Empire State Building, One World Trade Center, Madison Square Garden, and the Chrysler Building.

=== Plot ===
Spider-Man defeats Wilson Fisk, creating a criminal power vacuum in New York City. A masked gang known as the Inner Demons begins seizing Fisk's illicit assets, and Mary Jane and Spider-Man learn that they are seeking something called Devil's Breath. With the aid of Officer Jefferson Davis, Spider-Man thwarts a Demon attack. Jefferson is lauded for his heroism at a re-election event for Mayor Norman Osborn. The Demons attack the event, killing Jefferson and many other attendees. Peter witnesses Martin Li leading the attack and appearing as “Mister Negative”, but is knocked unconscious before he can intervene. Following the attack, Norman hires Silver Sablinova and Sable International to supplant the police. Peter befriends Jefferson's son, Miles Morales, and persuades him to volunteer at F.E.A.S.T.

Peter and Otto Octavius continue their research into advanced prosthetic limbs, but Norman withdraws their funding in an attempt to force Otto to work for his mega-corporation Oscorp. While searching for Martin, Spider-Man discovers that Devil's Breath is a lethal, virulent bioweapon inadvertently created by Oscorp while developing a cure for genetic diseases. Martin steals the only sample of Devil's Breath and threatens to release it unless Norman surrenders to him. With Mary Jane’s help, Spider-Man defeats Mister Negative, who is subsequently incarcerated at nearby maximum-security prison the Raft, while the Devil's Breath is secured.

Meanwhile, Otto obsesses over creating enhanced limbs that exceed the human body's limitations, creating four mechanical tentacles operated from his back and mentally controlled via a neural interface. He reveals to Peter that he is suffering from a neuromuscular disease that will inevitably immobilize him and that enhanced limbs will allow him to continue his work when his body fails. Peter warns Otto that the interface could impact his mind and personality. Otto continues its use in secret, overcome with anger at Norman. While investigating a breakout at the Raft, Spider-Man learns that some of his greatest enemies—Martin, Electro, Vulture, Rhino, and Scorpion—have escaped. They subdue Spider-Man and present him to a crazed Otto, now "Doctor Octopus", who warns Spider-Man not to interfere before retaking the Devil's Breath and releasing it in Times Square, causing a mass outbreak that infects numerous people, including Aunt May. New York descends into chaos while Otto's team attacks the city. Norman declares martial law and blames Spider-Man for the incident, branding him a fugitive.

Spider-Man gradually takes back the city, defeating Electro, Vulture, Rhino, and Scorpion. Mary Jane infiltrates Norman's penthouse and learns that Oscorp developed Devil's Breath to cure Norman's terminally ill son Harry. As a child, Martin was a test subject for the cure, gaining his abilities in an explosion of energy that also killed his parents and caused his hatred for Norman. She also learns that an antidote for Devil's Breath exists and that Martin has stolen it. Spider-Man tracks down and defeats Martin, but Otto arrives, brutalizes Spider-Man, and escapes with the antidote and Norman. While Spider-Man recovers, Miles is bitten by an Oscorp genetically modified spider that Mary Jane unknowingly carried from Norman's penthouse.

Peter builds himself an armored “Anti-Ock” suit and confronts Otto atop Oscorp Tower, rescuing Norman. Otto reveals that he knows Peter's secret identity. Spider-Man defeats Otto and retrieves the antidote, leaving a motionless Otto to be arrested. Peter is forced to choose between using the limited cure to save May from her imminent death or synthesizing a vaccine for the infected masses; he decides to save everyone. Before she dies, May reveals that she knows he is Spider-Man and is proud of him.

Three months later, New York has returned to normal, and Peter and Mary Jane rekindle their relationship. Miles reveals to Peter that he has gained spider-like powers, prompting Peter to reveal his own. Having resigned as mayor in disgrace, Norman enters a secret laboratory where Harry is kept in stasis with a black, web-like substance. (Note: Identified off-screen as the Venom symbiote) As Norman places his hand on the tank, the substance reacts and copies him.

== Development ==
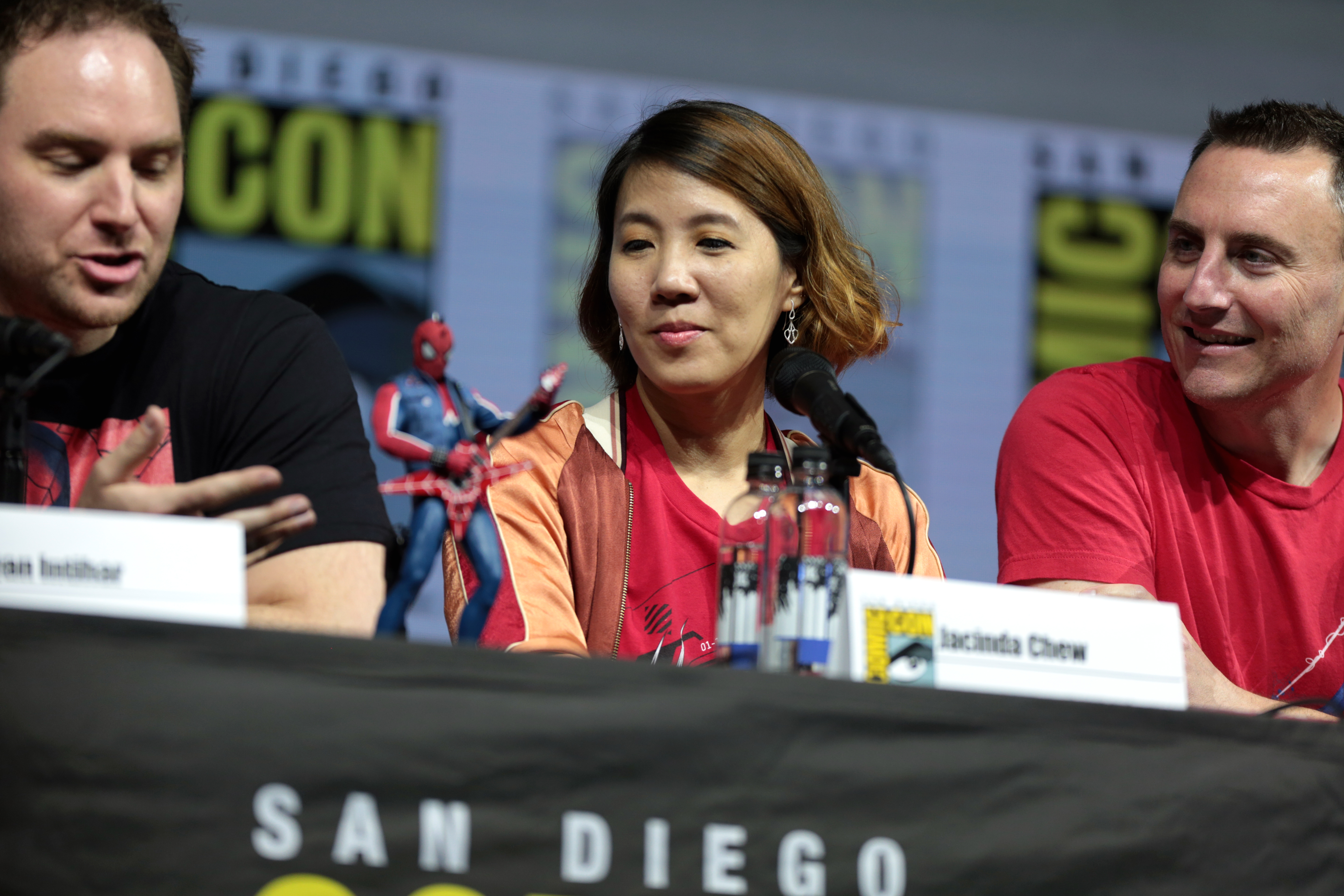
Creative director Bryan Intihar (left), art director Jacinda Chew (middle), and lead writer Jon Paquette speaking about the game at the 2018 San Diego Comic-Con

Marvel's Spider-Man came about after Sony Interactive Entertainment's Vice President of Product Development Connie Booth visited Insomniac Games to speak with CEO Ted Price. Insomniac had recently released its Xbox One-exclusive game Sunset Overdrive; without a formal agreement in place, discussions about the potential new project were held off the record. Booth mooted the idea of Insomniac working on a game based on a Marvel Comics property. Price recalled having a "fairly neutral" response, as Insomniac had only developed original properties, but his developers were enthusiastic about the project.

The project marked a change in Marvel's video games strategy; Jay Ong, Senior Vice President of Marvel Games, said Marvel had previously released software based on or tied to the release of films based on their properties, but this meant game developers did not have time to create impressive products. Publisher Activision had been responsible for Spider-Man games since 2000; Ong said this would no longer be the case and future Spider-Man games were in the hands of Sony and Insomniac. Marvel did not want the game to be based on an existing film or comic book story, and allowed Insomniac to choose a character with which to tell an original story; the team chose Spider-Man, saying they related to the dynamic between the heroic Spider-Man and his everyman alter-ego Peter Parker.

Creative director Bryan Intihar said: "I feel like he's the most relatable of the heroes. As much as I love Tony Stark, it's harder to identify with a billionaire. As much as I love Thor, it's hard to identify with a god. Peter makes mistakes, he has ups and downs in his career, his relationships, his family. I think we can all relate to that". Price also commented that Spider-Man "is so human, and he's so relatable. He's also the most popular Marvel character in the world, I think". Price also considered the technical benefits; Sunset Overdrive has a dynamic traversal system that could be built upon for Spider-Man. Marvel's Spider-Man became the first licensed property developed by Insomniac in its 22-year existence.

While initially excited, team members found the project daunting because of Spider-Man's popularity and the wealth of existing stories and versions of the character. Art director Jacinda Chew saw opportunity in the character's extensive history, and consulted online references and Marvel staff with extensive knowledge of the character.

Marvel's Spider-Man uses Insomniac's proprietary engine that was previously used in Sunset Overdrive and modified to support 4K resolutions and HDR for their 2016 game Ratchet & Clank. The game was announced in June 2016 at Sony's Electronic Entertainment Expo press conference. After approximately four years in development, Marvel's Spider-Man was finalized in July 2018, when it was released to manufacturing. Insomniac refused to confirm a sequel to Marvel's Spider-Man but Intihar said the developers wanted the audience debating what they might do. He said they wanted to keep players engaged, starting with the Marvel's Spider-Man: The City That Never Sleeps downloadable content (DLC), whose story continues after the conclusion of the main game.

=== Writing and characters ===
Intihar worked with a team of writers, under lead writer Jon Paquette to create an original version of Spider-Man that remained true to the original. Alongside Paquette, the story was written by Ben Arfman and Kelsey Beachum. Christos Gage co-wrote the script and Dan Slott provided additional story contributions. Insomniac researched iterations of the character to understand the elements that make a compelling Spider-Man story, after which Paquette wanted to avoid drawing too much influence from any single version. The team learned that whenever Spider-Man wins, Peter Parker loses, and vice versa. Intihar said that from conception, the game was designed to be as much Peter's story as Spider-Man's. The team avoided retelling Spider-Man's origin story, reasoning that it was common knowledge.

Yuri Lowenthal provides the voice of Spider-Man / Peter Parker. Working with voice director Kris Zimmerman, Lowenthal tried to differentiate his voices for Peter—where he is gentler—and as Spider-Man, where he is more confident, but thought the voices should not be completely different and spent a large amount of time practicing his performances to achieve a balance. Paquette persuaded the studio to cast him in the role because he trusted Lowenthal's acting ability and would not have brought him up otherwise. Multiple versions of the same conversation were recorded for Spider-Man's open-world dialogue for his at-rest state and that of exertion; for instance in combat or web-swinging. The recordings can switch mid-conversation if Spider-Man switches from resting to being in combat. Lowenthal worked with two stunt coordinators during the game's development.

Peter's relationship with Otto Octavius came from a desire to give him a job that embraced his intelligence. The writers considered ways to make that job interesting; they thought of having him work for Otto and be partly responsible for creating one of his greatest nemeses. Paquette emphasized the pair's relationship, aiming to make Otto a tragic figure, optimist, and mentor to Peter instead of the more traditional megalomaniac. Paquette said that he wanted to detail their friendship to give Otto's transformation into Doctor Octopus more meaning. Chew researched Otto's historical comic-book depiction and design, noting his bowl cut hairstyle and green glasses, but chose to modernize his appearance to make him balding and nerdy. Intihar described Otto and Peter as parallels of each other in many ways, particularly their intelligence and compassion.

When depicting Peter's relationship with Mary Jane Watson, the writers wanted to demonstrate that she has her own skills that allow her to be a hero in her own right, requiring Peter to learn not to be overprotective of her and to rely on other people. Arfaman said Mary Jane was his favorite character to write for; her new job as a reporter allowed her more agency and to be an active partner to Spider-Man. Miles Morales was added as a younger character with whom younger audiences could identify when it was decided to use an older Peter Parker. The death of Aunt May at the end of the game was considered vital to Peter's growth and a challenge because May has a large role in historical Spider-Man stories; Paquette said the moment had to be earned. Marvel initially vetoed her death but its opinion changed as the development of the game progressed.

Early in the story, May advises Peter that he is only human; Paquette said the message she gives is to not take on too much himself and learn to rely on other people. By the game's third act, Peter learns to rely on Mary Jane and Miles, though by this point it is too late to save everyone and Peter is given an "impossible choice". Paquette described this as the heroic sacrifice that reveals something deep about the character and what he really cares about. May's death was described as an echo of Peter's Uncle Ben's, who dies because Peter makes a selfish decision; May dies because he makes a completely selfless one. As a result, Peter will feel mixed guilt. A bittersweet but happier scene between Peter and Mary Jane was inserted to end the game on a more positive note. His ally police chief captain Yuri Watanabe was written as a kindred spirit who shares with Spider-Man a sense of responsibility to protect the city and its inhabitants regardless of the personal cost.

Paquette described Mister Negative as the hero of his own story; his origin is designed to give purpose to both Norman Osborn—who is doing bad things with the goal of saving his son—and Otto. Mister Negative's alter ego Martin Li was given connections to both Aunt May and Peter to add more stress to Peter's life. Many of J. Jonah Jameson's podcast rants were written by Gage, who said he related to being a grouchy, middle-aged man. Gage considered that despite repeatedly blaming Spider-Man for events, the podcasts give the player insight to city residents' thoughts about Spider-Man and current affairs. Silver Sable was added because Gage felt that a force to increase the stakes as events in the city turn dire was needed. The in-game social media posts were written by members of Insomniac staff and Sony's QA department.

=== Design ===
To present the vast New York City game area, the map was divided into 800 square sections, each representing approximately 128 m^{2} (1,380 sq ft). As the playable character moves through it, out-of-view tiles are unloaded from memory and are replaced with tiles in view. Chief architect and core director Mike Fitzgerald said that when moving at Spider-Man's top speed, a new tile is loaded every second. For swinging, the team wanted to create a fun experience without making the physics too realistic. They combined camera movements, character animations, and field of view to make movement feel more heroic. To swing on webs, each web strand must be able to connect to a physical object. All architecture in the game world contains numerous anchor points; the ideal point is selected to maintain current momentum and direction. Each character has a high-quality model for closeups, cutscenes, and scripted sequences, possessing approximately 60,000 vertices. The game's final boss is rendered with a million polygons, the most Insomniac had used to render a character at that time.

Insomniac wanted to modernize Spider-Man's costume while paying homage to the original design by Steve Ditko. The new design features a large, white spider symbol that stretches across the torso, gauntlet-like gloves, and a sneaker-style design based on athletic-wear rather than knee-high boots. Chew said the design goal was to create clothing a "23-year-old, would-be superhero" would wear in 2018 New York City. White was added to the traditional, red-and-blue color scheme. Chew compared the outfit to compression wear and said each color represents a different material; blue is the most flexible and is where Spider-Man requires the most flexibility, such as his limbs. The red material is flexible but is thicker for protection from minor scuffs and scrapes, and the white, which is similar to carbon fiber and offers the most protection, is positioned on the chest, hands and feet. Each costume features custom web-shooters unique to the suit for which they were designed. Unlike previous incarnations as a model or nightclub owner, this version of Mary Jane is an aspiring reporter who wears a smart, sensible, and stylish outfit to reflect her modeling history. Chew said they aimed to use many body types for female characters. Mister Negative was initially designed as a young rebel wearing a leather jacket and sunglasses; the progression of the story influenced the character and the decision was made to better reflect his true nature, giving him a black-and-white suit showing his human and transformed negative-photo-effect persona.

The game's third act following the Raft escape was originally much bigger and included separate battles with the Vulture and Electro. Intihar said the game in this form was not working and they had to cut things, which they found difficult because it deviated from their intended vision. An unknown person had the idea of merging the Vulture and Electro fights, assembling a short demo to show it working as an aerial battle, which is how it appears in the finished game.

== Music ==
The game's music was composed by John Paesano. He worked on the project for over two years, beginning during the writing phase. The aim of the score was to make it its own character and to create a cinematic ambiance rather than being simply present in the background. The main theme took approximately two months to finish; this was then split off for other segments of the score for other characters. While Paesano was influenced by Spider-Man music from other media, he focused on the slightly older age of the game's Spider-Man, adding more gravitas to the score. He scored it more from the perspective of Peter Parker than Spider-Man to emphasize the character's humanity over his role as a superhero. Paesano aimed to keep the score simple and recognizable; he retained the same Spider-Man/Peter Parker theme throughout but modified it by using different instruments and arrangements. He wanted to avoid problems he perceived in films belonging to the Marvel Cinematic Universe, in which the many different character scores could get lost in each other. The central theme is even interwoven with villain scores—a technique Paesano compared to composer John Williams' work on Star Wars—to remind the audience that everything is part of Peter's story.

== Marketing ==
The game has been referenced or promoted in various other media. "Be Greater", a 90-second advertisement highlighting Spider-Man's battle against foes including Rhino and Scorpion was run during the 2018 NFL Kickoff Game, which had approximately 19.5 million viewers. PlayStation marketing head Eric Lempel said it was among the most expensive advertisements the company had ever run. In addition, videos showing features of the game narrated by characters including J. Jonah Jameson were released and artist Alex Ross was engaged to paint a custom cover for an issue of Game Informer. In New York City, a subway train was fully converted with Spider-Man marketing materials, including a full advertisement across the exterior, Spider-Man chairs and posters, and advertisements for the Daily Bugle. Shortly before the game's release, some fans were critical of marketing images of an early and later build of the game, both of which showed the same scene but the latter showed a smaller puddle of water than the former. Insomniac community director James Stevenson personally replied, confirming that there was no visual downgrade. Insomniac later parodied the criticism by offering cartoon puddle stickers for use in the game's photo mode. Shortly after release, Jacinda Chew offered to remove an in-game marriage proposal requested by a fan after it was revealed the relationship had since ended. The fan chose to retain the message, saying "I just want to see someone get married, through that thing".

=== Tie-in media and merchandise ===
Titan Books published two tie-in books for the game. The first, Marvel's Spider-Man: Hostile Takeover, was released on August 21, 2018. Hostile Takeover, which was written by David Liss, is about Spider-Man's conflict with the Kingpin as he attempts to blackmail Mayor Osborn into making him the city financier and the end of Peter and Mary Jane's relationship due to Peter's overprotectiveness. The book introduces the game's version of Echo, a deaf, female martial artist who joins forces with Spider-Man, and Blood Spider, a villain given superhuman abilities by Oscorp, and employed by Kingpin. The second book, Marvel's Spider-Man: The Art of the Game, is written by Paul Davies and contains the game's concept art, blueprints, and designs.

The game's version of Spider-Man appears in the 2018 comic book story Spider-Geddon written by Gage, a sequel to 2014's Spider-Verse that brings together Spider-people from different Marvel realities. Spider-Geddon issue #0, released on September 26, 2018, follows the Superior Spider-Man (an alternate universe version of Otto Octavius in Peter Parker's body), as he travels to the game's Earth (designated Earth-1048) to recruit the game's Spider-Man. The story of Spider-Geddon takes place after the events of the game, and also introduces the Earth-1048 version of Tarantula. Insomniac artists provided variant comic-book covers for the series. A six-issue comic miniseries book titled Marvel's Spider-Man: City at War was released beginning in March 2019. It follows the events of the game and introduces some new events. The series is published by Marvel, written by Dennis Hopeless, and includes art by Michelle Bandini and variant covers by Clayton Crain, David Nakayama, Gerardo Sandoval and Adi Granov. A second miniseries, Marvel's Spider-Man: Velocity, was released in August 2019. Also written by Hopeless, with art by Emilio Laiso, the miniseries takes place after the events of the game, detailing Spider-Man's encounter with the supervillain Swarm, and Mary Jane's work with reporter Ben Urich. A third miniseries, Marvel's Spider-Man: The Black Cat Strikes, was released in January 2020. Written by Hopeless with art by Luca Maresca, the miniseries adapts the events of the downloadable content The City That Never Sleeps while elaborating upon Spider-Man and Black Cat's relationship.

In 2019, Diamond Select Toys and Sideshow Collectibles released, respectively, a 10-inch statue of Spider-Man and a 1/6 scale statue based on the in-game Spider-Punk costume, including a guitar and spider-drone. Various Funko Pop! Vinyl figures have been released, based on different characters and designs from the game. The advanced suit created for the game appears in the 2018 film Spider-Man: Into the Spider-Verse among the suits collected by the Peter Parker of Miles Morales' universe. The game's incarnation of Spider-Man (credited as "Insomniac Spider-Man") later makes a cameo appearance in the aforementioned film's 2023 sequel Spider-Man: Across the Spider-Verse as a member of Miguel O'Hara's Spider Society, with Yuri Lowenthal briefly reprising his role.

=== Downloadable content ===
A story-based three-episode downloadable content (DLC) pack collectively known as The City That Never Sleeps was developed for Marvel's Spider-Man. Each episode includes new story missions, challenges (hosted by Screwball), enemies, and trophies. The first episode, "The Heist", was released on October 23, 2018; set several months after the end of the main game, the story follows the return of Spider-Man's ex-girlfriend Black Cat to New York for a heist, which draws him into a conflict with the Maggia crime families. "The Heist" DLC expansion includes three unlockable costumes; Spider-UK, Scarlet Spider II, and the Resilient Suit—an original design by artist Gabriele Dell'Otto. Episode 2, "Turf Wars", was released on November 20. The story follows Spider-Man's and his ally Yuri Watanabe's efforts to stop Hammerhead taking over the Maggia crime families and seizing control of crime in New York. "Turf Wars" includes three new costumes; Mangaverse Spider-Man, the Iron Spider, and the Spider Armor MK I.

The final episode, "Silver Lining", was released on December 21. Its plot features Silver Sable's return to New York City to reclaim her technology that has been stolen by the Maggia. She teams up with Spider-Man to confront Hammerhead, who has used her technology to make himself virtually indestructible. "Silver Lining" adds three new costumes; Into the Spider-Verse (based on the depiction of the alternate Peter B. Parker in the concurrently released film), Cyborg Spider-Man (based on the design from Spider-Man #21) and the Spider-Man armor created by Aaron Aikman—an alternative version of Spider-Man featured in the crossover story "Edge of Spider-Verse". The Spider-Man costume used in Sam Raimi's Spider-Man film trilogy was released separately in December the same year, dubbed in-game as the "Webbed Suit". Two more costumes were released in January 2019; one is based on his Future Foundation costume and the other, titled "Bombastic Bag-Man Suit", is based on issue #258 of The Amazing Spider-Man (1984), in which Spider-Man is forced to wear a Fantastic Four costume and a brown paper bag to conceal his identity. A further two suits were released in July the same year, based on Spider-Man: Far From Home: the Upgraded and Stealth suits.

== Release ==
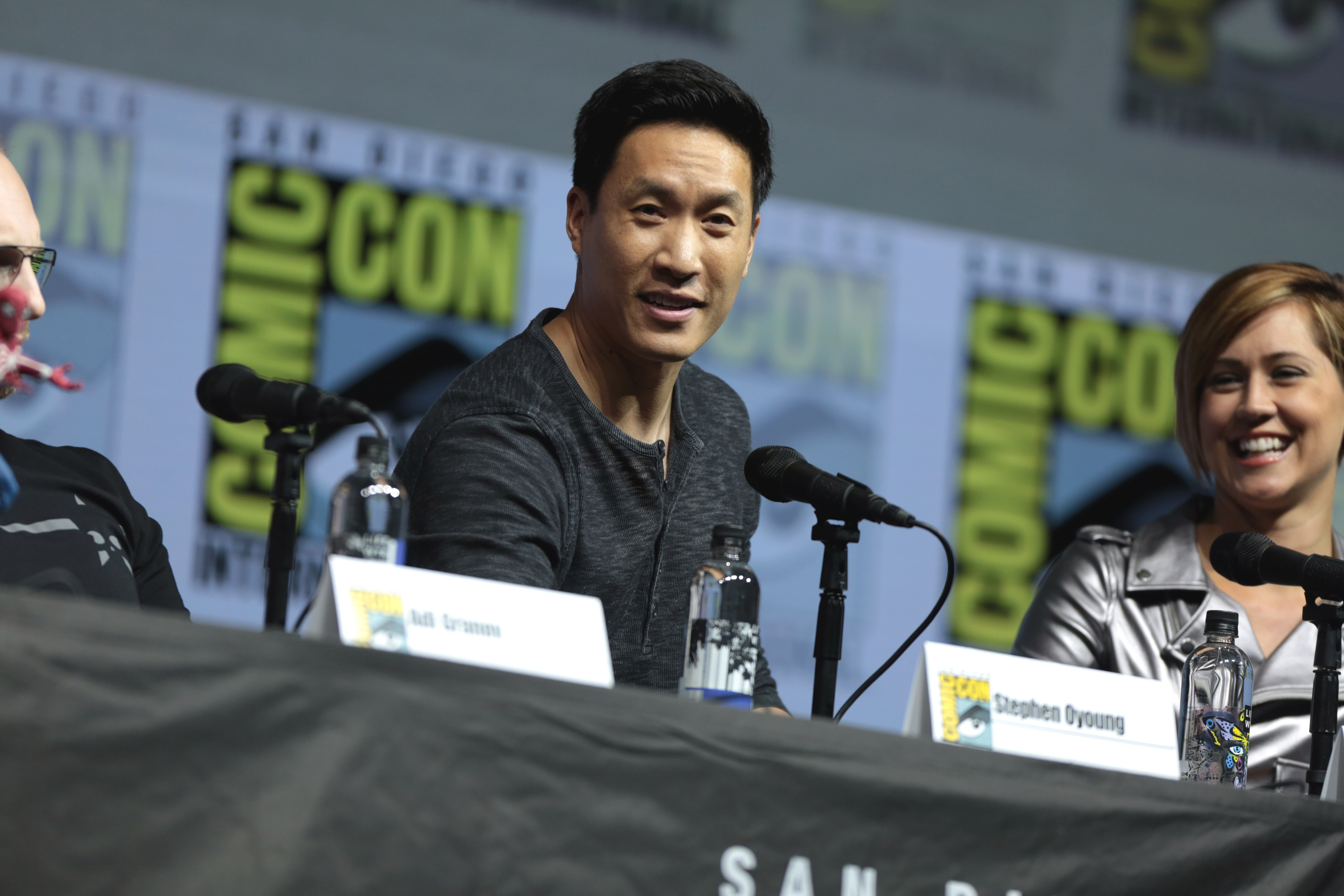
Stephen Oyoung, voice actor for Mister Negative, promoting Marvel's Spider-Man at the 2018 San Diego Comic-Con

Marvel's Spider-Man was released worldwide on September 7, 2018, exclusively for PlayStation 4. Customers who pre-ordered the game were given instant access to some unlockable, in-game features, including alternative costumes (Spider-Punk, Iron Spider, and the Velocity Suit, the latter designed by comic book artist Adi Granov), skill points to unlock abilities, the spider-drone, a Spider-Man theme featuring artwork by Granov, and a user avatar for the PlayStation software. Special versions of the game were also made available; the "Digital Deluxe" version includes access to The City That Never Sleeps's three story-based DLC chapters and a limited-edition Spider-Man pin for pre-orders of this version in the U.S. and Canada. The Collector's Edition includes The City That Never Sleeps DLC, a custom steelbook case for the game, an artbook containing concept and unreleased art, a white spider sticker, and a Spider-Man statue created by Gentle Giant. Sony also released a limited-edition red PlayStation 4 Pro bearing the Spider-Man emblem and including the standard version of the game. Marvel's Spider-Man: Game of the Year Edition was released on August 28, 2019, containing the game and The City That Never Sleeps DLC.

=== Marvel's Spider-Man Remastered ===
Marvel's Spider-Man Remastered, a remastered port of Spider-Man, includes the original game and its free downloadable content, The City That Never Sleeps, three additional suits, further trophies and new additions to the photo mode. These three additional suits include the suit worn in The Amazing Spider-Man (2012) film and two original suits designed by Insomniac, the Arachnid Rider suit, and the Armored Advanced suit. Players can also transfer their save files from the PlayStation 4 version, allowing them to carry over their progress to the remaster. It also features many of the updated textures, graphical and performance improvements from Marvel's Spider-Man: Miles Morales, support for the console's 3D audio capabilities, "near instant loading" and support for the DualSense controller's haptic feedback. The remaster also changes the facial model for Peter Parker from John Bubniak to Ben Jordan to better match Yuri Lowenthal's facial capture.

Marvel's Spider-Man Remastered was released for the PlayStation 5 in select territories on November 12, 2020, with a wider release on November 19. It was initially only available as part of the Ultimate Edition of Marvel's Spider-Man: Miles Morales, and as a paid digital upgrade of the standard edition. The developer clarified that there were no plans for a physical release of the remaster. Two new suits for the version, both based on the suits worn in the film Spider-Man: No Way Home (2021), were released in December 2021 via updates. A port of Remastered for Windows developed in collaboration with PlayStation sister studio Nixxes Software, was released as a standalone title for Steam and the Epic Games Store on August 12, 2022. Remastered became available as a standalone purchase, or as a paid upgrade for owners of the original game, on May 4, 2023.

== Reception ==
Reception

Aggregate scores
Aggregator	Score
Metacritic	87/100
OpenCritic	98% recommend(Remaster)

Review scores
Publication	Score
Destructoid	9/10
Electronic Gaming Monthly	9/10
Game Informer	9.5/10
GameRevolution	4/5
GameSpot	9/10
GamesRadar+	4.5/5
IGN	8.7/10
PC Gamer (US)	75/100
USgamer	4.5/5
VideoGamer.com	8/10

Marvel's Spider-Man received "generally favorable reviews" according to review aggregator Metacritic. The game received praise for its gameplay, graphics, narrative, and characterization, but was criticized for its familiar open-world tropes and lack of innovation. Critics called Marvel's Spider-Man one of the greatest superhero games ever made. VentureBeat called it "the best Spider-Man game ... and one of the best super hero games ever", while Game Informer wrote that "like Batman: Arkham Asylum before it, Spider-Man raises the bar for one of the world's most beloved heroes".

Reviewers praised the gameplay mechanics; the web-swinging traversal, in particular, received unanimous acclaim. EGMNOW said it was a more streamlined version of the physics-based system used in Spider-Man 2 (2004), while GameRevolution praised the way it conveyed speed and movement. Game Informer said web-swinging was so much fun that they never used the game's fast-travel system. PC Gamer found that the mouse and keyboard controls on Windows were comparable—and, in some cases, superior—to the PlayStation controller.

The combat was praised for its speed and fluidity while presenting a range of gadgetry and environmental options to execute attacks. Game Informer highlighted its efficient use of the environment, while Game Revolution applauded the combat as some of the best they had experienced in a game. IGN found that after gaining access to more abilities, combat allowed for an array of improvization. EGMNOW wrote that the combat offered many different options, but had little depth. They noted that their only gripe was that they felt using the in-game gadget-select menu disrupted the game's flow. EGMNOW and GameSpot compared the movement system with the Batman: Arkham series; the latter wrote that the inspired combat "suitably characterizes Spidey's acrobatic nature". USGamer, however, said the Arkham comparisons were unfair and that the extent and capabilities of the gadgets on offer made it unique from the Arkham series, as well as other Spider-Man games. They disliked only the auto-lock system for making it difficult in larger enemy groups to hit the intended target. IGN wrote that Spider-Man's stealth scenarios perfectly highlighted Spider-Man's talents—especially his love for designing gadgets—saying that there was a "methodical thrill" in stalking enemies. EGMNOW said that while the stealth options were "a bit shallow", they were "never unpleasant and rarely mandatory".

IGN praised the "gorgeous" skyscrapers and wrote that "swinging around at dusk as the calm oranges of the setting sun hit the reflective glass ... evoked some of the most calming, zen-like gameplay sessions I've experienced in a while". They found that while the faces of the main characters were well animated, those of minor characters were often unimpressive. GamesRadar+ called it a "lovely looking game" and said: "It's rare to see something this big and detailed consistently look so good, with the very final story moments, in particular, some of the most spectacular looking stuff I've seen in a while".

The story received positive reviews. USGamer said it was the best aspect of Spider-Man and generally praised the handling of the cast. GamesRadar+ described the characters as "being voiced and performed with a depth and charisma I wasn't expecting". Game Revolution noted it presents many familiar tropes, but featured enough new ideas to keep things interesting. IGN wrote that despite having a moderately slow start, the story "consistently delivers that sense of weight and impact". They praised the focus on Peter Parker and highlighted voice actor Yuri Lowenthal for having "an emotional honesty" in this version of Spider-Man that made it one of their favorite portrayals of the character. Similarly, EGMNOW praised the game's characterization and understanding of Peter, which they found was better than almost any comic adaptation, and commended the supporting cast for having "crystal-clear" motivations and acting "as a foil or mirror for [Peter's] altruistic approach to heroism". Some critics appreciated Insomniac's decision not to portray an origin story in the game. EGMNOW was disappointed that the side missions were not of the same quality as the main story quests; VideoGamer.com wrote that many of the side missions felt unnecessary in the overarching plot.

IGN wrote that the boss fights were "big and exciting ... full of tense action". They criticized a few, however, for feeling simplistic and said that because of their focus during the beginning and end of the story, there were large portions in the middle where boss fights were noticeably absent. GameSpot praised the ability to use different suit powers independently from their original outfits. Game Informer said the stealth sections that include the ability to play as Mary Jane Watson and Miles Morales "bring variety in fun ways, including solid stealth mechanics and clever puzzles". GameSpot said that while they felt the mechanics were not particularly demanding, they thought the segments featured "some memorably tense scenarios". In contrast, VideoGamer.com described them as "a bit hit-and-miss ... and a bit grating at times".

The game world received criticism that focused on Spider-Man's inability to innovate as an open-world game, instead relying on familiar and repetitive tropes found in other free-roaming titles. Game Revolution disliked the way many of the side activities became monotonous after a short time and criticized the lack of variety in the collectibles quests. EGMNOW wrote that they were more tolerant than most for collectibles and side-content but thought there was still too much of it in Marvel's Spider-Man. Reviewers were disappointed with the game's inclusion of towers that reveal portions of the map and identify waypoints, which had become standard features in a number of earlier open-world games.

=== Sales ===
Marvel's Spider-Man sold 3.3 million units (including those bundled with the PS4 console) in its first three days of release, making it the fastest-selling first-party video game release in Sony's history, narrowly beating God of War's 3.1 million. USA Today estimated the game made at least $198 million during this period, surpassing the $117 million North American opening-weekend box office take of the 2017 film Spider-Man: Homecoming, though units sold with the console would likely inflate this figure. The game had sold over 9 million units by November 2018. It had sold 13.2 million units by August 2019. The Marvel's Spider-Man series had sold over 33 million units by May 2022.

In the United States, according to sales projections by The NPD Group, Marvel's Spider-Man's release-month sales were 37% higher than the combined release-month sales of all Spider-Man games released since the group began tracking figures in 1995. By November 2018, it became the fastest-selling superhero game in the U.S.; by July 2019, it had become the best-selling.

In the United Kingdom, Marvel's Spider-Man became the fastest-selling game of 2018 in terms of physical units, overtaking Far Cry 5—which was released on three other platforms and itself had sold double the number of units as God of War. It was also the fastest-selling Marvel-branded game, beating Lego Marvel Super Heroes (2013) by a wide margin, and the fastest-selling individual format game since 2017's Call of Duty: WWII. It sold less than the fastest-selling superhero game of this generation, Batman: Arkham Knight (2015), which was released on more platforms. Figures exclude digital sales in the UK. Marvel's Spider-Man remained the top-selling video game for three consecutive weeks until it was replaced by the multiplatform title FIFA 19. It was the second best-selling game of September, finishing behind FIFA 19—which had only been on sale for two days—and exceeded the first-month sales of PS4 exclusives Uncharted 4: A Thief's End (44% increase), Horizon Zero Dawn (94%), and God of War (138%). It remained in the top-ten-selling games until January 3, 2019, lasting 13 weeks.

In Japan, approximately 125,154 physical units were sold during its first week, becoming the top-selling game of any format, and by its third week it retained that position, selling a cumulative total of 244,051 units. The game also became one of the best-selling Western-developed PS4 titles there, being surpassed only by Call of Duty: Black Ops 4 and Minecraft, and the best-selling Western-developed, Sony-funded title since 1998's Crash Bandicoot: Warped for the PlayStation.

=== Accolades and recognition ===
Marvel's Spider-Man appeared on several lists of the top video games of 2018, including first place by Wired, second place by Time, third place by Push Square, fifth place by EGM, ninth place by Polygon, and tenth place by The Daily Telegraph. Shacknews and The Verge named it "Game of the Year" and Eurogamer listed it as one of the top-30 games of the year. A poll of 128 Japanese game developers by Famitsu magazine named Spider-Man as their game of the year. In 2019, GamesRadar+ listed it as the seventy-fifth best game of the decade.

== Legacy ==
=== Sequels ===
An additional game centered on Miles Morales, titled Marvel's Spider-Man: Miles Morales was released for the PlayStation 4 and PlayStation 5 consoles worldwide on November 12, 2020, along with a release for Windows on November 18, 2022. The story takes place roughly a year after the first game's conclusion, with players controlling Miles, as New York City's only Spider-Man while Peter has travelled to Symkaria as a photographer to cover an ongoing civil war.

Marvel's Spider-Man 2 was released on October 20, 2023, for PlayStation 5. Intihar and Smith return as creative director and game director, respectively. Lowenthal and Jeter reprise their roles as Peter Parker and Miles Morales, with Tony Todd voicing the character Venom. Kraven the Hunter is played by Jim Pirri.

=== Related Marvel games ===
Sony Interactive Entertainment published Marvel's Iron Man VR in July 2020, developed by Camouflaj for the PlayStation VR headset and based on the Marvel Comics character. Game director Ryan Payton suggested that while the intent was to tell a self-contained story, there were "opportunities to link the worlds" and he expressed hope that future Spider-Man games from Insomniac could connect the two titles.

Alongside Marvel's Spider-Man 2, Insomniac Games also announced a standalone game titled Marvel's Wolverine, based on the Marvel Comics character of the same name which is also in development for PlayStation 5. It is intended to share continuity with the Spider-Man games, with the game being co-directed by Brian Horton and Cameron Christian, the creative director and game director of Marvel's Spider-Man: Miles Morales, respectively.
