= List of best-selling PlayStation 4 video games =

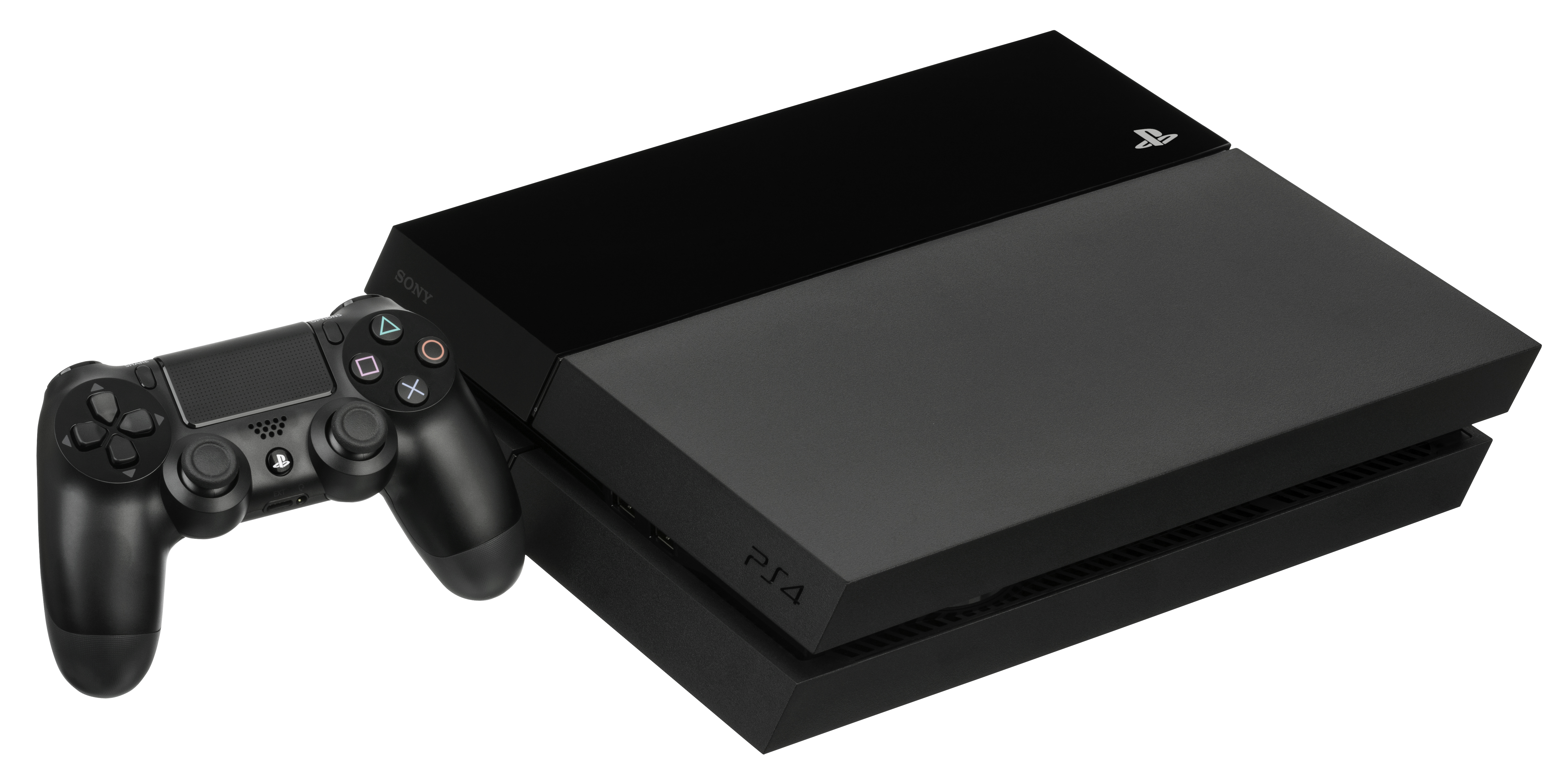
PlayStation 4 with DualShock 4 controller

This is a list of video games for the PlayStation 4 video game console that have sold or shipped at least one million copies.

== List ==
List of best-selling PlayStation 4 video games
Game	Copies sold	Release date (Note: Only the initial release date on this platform is listed.)	Genre(s)	Developer(s)	Publisher(s)
Grand Theft Auto V	29.52 million (Note: Of the 90 million total units sold by April 2018, 27.4% of that total were for the PlayStation 4 version.) (Note: Grand Theft Auto V sales breakdown: Asia – over 1,000,000; Japan – 578,165 (retail) (Note: Combined Japanese sales of the original Grand Theft Auto V PlayStation 4 SKU and the lower price SKU.); France – 993,545; Germany – 500,000)	November 18, 2014	Action-adventure	Rockstar North	Rockstar Games
Marvel's Spider-Man	22.68 million (Note: Marvel's Spider-Man sales breakdown: Japan – 125,154 (retail))	September 7, 2018	Action-adventure	Insomniac Games	Sony Interactive Entertainment
God of War	21.02 million	April 20, 2018	Action-adventure; hack and slash	Santa Monica Studio	Sony Interactive Entertainment
Horizon Zero Dawn	19.29 million (Note: Horizon Zero Dawn sales breakdown: Germany – 200,000; Japan – 204,517 (retail); United Kingdom – 286,538 (retail); Worldwide – 915,000 (digital sales))	February 28, 2017	Action role-playing	Guerrilla Games	Sony Interactive Entertainment
Uncharted 4: A Thief's End	18.65 million (Note: Uncharted 4: A Thief's End sales breakdown: Germany – 500,000; Japan – 190,230 (retail); United States – 879,000 (retail) (Note: 79,000 of the 879,000 were sold as part of a bundle.))	May 10, 2016	Action-adventure	Naughty Dog	Sony Interactive Entertainment
The Last of Us Remastered	18.63 million	July 29, 2014	Action-adventure Survival horror	Naughty Dog	Sony Computer Entertainment
Minecraft: PlayStation 4 Edition	17 million	September 4, 2014	Sandbox; survival	4J Studios	Sony Computer Entertainment
Call of Duty: Black Ops III	15 million	November 6, 2015	First-person shooter	Sledgehammer Games	Activision
Call of Duty: WWII	13.4 million	November 3, 2017	First-person shooter	Treyarch	Activision
Gran Turismo Sport	12.97 million	October 17, 2017	Racing	Polyphony Digital	Sony Interactive Entertainment
The Witcher 3: Wild Hunt	12.40 million	May 18, 2015	Action role-playing	CD Projekt Red	CD Projekt
The Last of Us Part II	10.30 million (Note: The Last of Us Part II sales breakdown: United Kingdom – 543,218; Germany – 200,000; Japan – 178,696 (retail))	June 19, 2020	Action-adventure; survival horror	Naughty Dog	Sony Interactive Entertainment
Uncharted: The Nathan Drake Collection	9.98 million	October 7, 2015	Action-adventure, third person shooter	Bluepoint Games	Sony Computer Entertainment
Ghost of Tsushima	9.73 million	July 17, 2020	Action-adventure; stealth	Sucker Punch Productions	Sony Interactive Entertainment
Bloodborne	9.3 million	March 24, 2015	Action role-playing	FromSoftware	Sony Computer Entertainment
Call of Duty: Infinite Warfare	8.48 million	November 4, 2016	First-person shooter	Infinity Ward	Activision
Star Wars Battlefront	8.42 million	November 17, 2015	First-person shooter; third-person shooter	EA DICE	Electronic Arts
Days Gone	7.32 million	April 26, 2019	Action-adventure	Bend Studio	Sony Interactive Entertainment
Ratchet & Clank	7.05 million	April 12, 2016	Third-person shooter, Platformer	Insomniac Games	Sony Interactive Entertainment
Tekken 7	6.23 million	June 2, 2017	Fighting	Bandai Namco Studios	Bandai Namco Entertainment
Naruto Shippuden: Ultimate Ninja Storm 4	6.22 million (Note: Naruto Shippuden: Ultimate Ninja Storm 4 sales breakdown: The game itself – 4,300,00; Road to Boruto expansion pack – 1,920,00)	February 4, 2016	Fighting	CyberConnect2	Bandai Namco Entertainment
Call of Duty: Advanced Warfare	6.03 million	November 4, 2014	First-person shooter	Sledgehammer Games	Activision
Infamous Second Son	6 million (Note: Infamous Second Son sales breakdown: Japan – 47,396 (retail))	March 21, 2014	Action-adventure	Sucker Punch Productions	Sony Computer Entertainment
God of War III Remastered	5.6 million	July 14, 2015	Action-adventure	Wholesale Algorithms	Sony Computer Entertainment
Detroit: Become Human	5.5 million (Note: Detroit: Become Human sales breakdown: Japan – 67,415 (retail))	May 25, 2018	Adventure	Quantic Dream	Sony Interactive Entertainment
LittleBigPlanet 3	5.5 million	November 18, 2014	Sandbox	Sumo Digital	Sony Computer Entertainment
Uncharted: The Lost Legacy	5.34 million	August 22, 2017	Action-adventure	Naughty Dog	Sony Interactive Entertainment
Final Fantasy VII Remake	5 million (Note: Final Fantasy VII Remake sales breakdown: Germany – 100,000; Japan – 702,853 (retail))	April 10, 2020	Action role-playing	Square Enix	Square Enix
Driveclub	4.97 million	October 7, 2014	Racing	Evolution Studios	Sony Computer Entertainment
Dragon Ball Xenoverse 2	4.47 million	October 25, 2016	Fighting; role-playing	Dimps	Bandai Namco Entertainment
Death Stranding	4.38 million	November 8, 2019	Action	Kojima Productions	Sony Interactive Entertainment
Dragon Ball FighterZ	4.31 million	January 26, 2018	Fighting	Bandai Namco Studios; Arc System Works	Bandai Namco Entertainment
Until Dawn	4.03 million	August 25, 2015	Survival Horror	Supermassive Games	Sony Computer Entertainment
Monster Hunter: World	4 million (Note: Monster Hunter: World sales breakdown: Asia – 4,000,000; Japan – 3,200,000 (2,006,158 (retail)))	January 26, 2018	Action role-playing	Capcom	Capcom
Dark Souls III	3.91 million	March 24, 2016	Action role-playing	FromSoftware	Bandai Namco Entertainment: JP: FromSoftware
Jump Force	3.85 million	February 14, 2019	Fighting	Spike Chunsoft	Bandai Namco Entertainment
Cyberpunk 2077	3.83 million (Note: Of the 13.7 million total units sold by April 2021, 28% were for the PlayStation 4 version.)	December 10, 2020	Action role-playing	CD Projekt Red	CD Projekt
Metal Gear Solid V: The Phantom Pain	3.41 million (Note: Metal Gear Solid V: The Phantom Pain sales breakdown: Germany – 100,000; Japan – 467,698 (retail); United States – 550,000 (retail))	September 1, 2015	Action-adventure; stealth	Kojima Productions	Konami
Dragon Ball Z: Kakarot	3.22 million	January 16, 2020	Action role-playing; Fighting	CyberConnect2	Bandai Namco Entertainment
FIFA 17	3.11 million (Note: FIFA 17 sales breakdown: Asia – Over 500,000; Japan – 98,861 (retail); France – 1,118,149 (retail); Germany – 1,500,000)	September 27, 2016	Sports	EA Canada; EA Bucharest	EA Sports
Elden Ring	2.67 million	February 25, 2022	Action role-playing	FromSoftware	Bandai Namco Entertainment: JP: FromSoftware
Nioh	2.67 million (Note: Nioh sales breakdown: Asia – 500,000; Japan – 133,401 (retail))	February 7, 2017	Action role-playing	Team Ninja	WW: Sony Interactive Entertainment; JP: Koei Tecmo
Nier: Automata	2.6 million (Note: Nier: Automata sales breakdown: Japan – 352,096 (retail))	February 23, 2017	Action role-playing	PlatinumGames	Square Enix
Final Fantasy XV	2.57 million (Note: Final Fantasy XV sales breakdown: France – 167,774 (retail); Germany – 200,000; Japan – 1,100,000; United States – over 1,119,000 (Note: Over 70% of Final Fantasy XV sales in the United States were for PlayStation 4.))	November 29, 2016	Action role-playing	Square Enix Business Division 2	Square Enix
Dragon Ball: Xenoverse	2.52 million	February 5, 2015	Action role-playing; Fighting	Dimps	Bandai Namco Entertainment
Crash Bandicoot N. Sane Trilogy	2.5 million (Note: Crash Bandicoot N. Sane Trilogy sales breakdown: France – 301,285 (retail); Germany – 100,000; Japan – 46,237 (retail); United Kingdom – 651,354; United States – 400,000)	June 30, 2017	Platform	Vicarious Visions	Activision
FIFA 18	2.47 million (Note: FIFA 18 sales breakdown: Asia – Over 500,000; France – 971,885 (retail); Germany – 1,000,000)	September 29, 2017	Sports	EA Canada; EA Bucharest	EA Sports
Persona 5 Royal	2.3 million	October 31, 2019	Role-playing; social simulation	P-Studio	Atlus
Naruto to Boruto: Shinobi Striker	2.13 million	August 31, 2018	Action; Fighting	Soliel Ltd.	Bandai Namco Entertainment
Killzone: Shadow Fall	2.1 million (Note: Killzone: Shadow Fall sales breakdown: Japan – 40,837 (retail))	November 15, 2013	First-person shooter	Guerrilla Games	Sony Computer Entertainment
Gran Turismo 7	2.09 million (Note: Of the total 11 million copies sold by January 2026, 19% were for the PS4)	March 4, 2022	Sim racing	Polyphony Digital	Sony Interactive Entertainment
Naruto Shippuden: Ultimate Ninja Storm Trilogy	2.08 million	July 27, 2017	Fighting	CyberConnect2	Bandai Namco Entertainment
Knack	2 million (Note: Knack sales breakdown: Japan – 393,348 (retail) (Note: Knack was bundled with every PlayStation 4 sold in Japan during the console's launch period.))	November 15, 2013	Platform; beat 'em up	Japan Studio	Sony Computer Entertainment
Dark Souls Remastered	1.89 million	May 24, 2018	Action role-playing	FromSoftware	Bandai Namco Entertainment: JP: FromSoftware
Kingdom Hearts HD 1.5 + 2.5 Remix	1.8 million	March 28, 2017	Action role-playing	Square Enix	Square Enix
Dark Souls II: Scholar of the First Sin	1.79 million	April 2, 2015	Action role-playing	FromSoftware	Bandai Namco Entertainment: JP: FromSoftware
FIFA 20	1.76 million (Note: FIFA 20 sales breakdown: Asia – Over 500,000; France – 1,261,511)	September 24, 2019	Sports	EA Canada; EA Bucharest	EA Sports
Nioh 2	1.46 million	March 12, 2020	Action role-playing	Team Ninja	WW: Sony Interactive Entertainment; JP: Koei Tecmo
FIFA 19	1.44 million (Note: FIFA 19 sales breakdown: Asia – Over 500,000; France – 945,190 (retail))	September 25, 2018	Sports	EA Canada; EA Bucharest	EA Sports
Soulcalibur VI	1.44 million	October 19, 2018	Fighting	Bandai Namco Studios; Dimps	Bandai Namco Entertainment
Battlefield 1	1.3 million (Note: Battlefield 1 sales breakdown: Asia – 500,000; Japan – 261,179 (retail); France – 363,839 (retail); Germany – 500,000)	October 21, 2016	First-person shooter	EA DICE	Electronic Arts
Dragon Quest XI: Echoes of an Elusive Age	1.3 million (Note: Dragon Quest XI: Echoes of an Elusive Age sales breakdown: Japan – 1,347,582 (retail))	July 29, 2017	Role-playing	Square Enix	Square Enix
Kingdom Hearts HD 2.8 Final Chapter Prologue	1.3 million	January 12, 2017	Action role-playing	Square Enix Business Division 3	Square Enix
Metal Gear Solid V: Ground Zeroes	1.27 million	March 18, 2014	Action-adventure; Stealth	Kojima Productions	Konami Digital Entertainment
Tales of Berseria	1.24 million	August 18, 2016	Action role-playing	Bandai Namco Studios	Bandai Namco Entertainment
Final Fantasy XII: The Zodiac Age	1.2 million (Note: Final Fantasy XII: The Zodiac Age sales breakdown: Japan – 132,188 (retail))	July 11, 2017	Role-playing	Square Enix	Square Enix
FIFA 22	1.15 million (Note: FIFA 22 sales breakdown: France – 1,155,084)	October 1, 2021	Sports	EA Canada; EA Bucharest	EA Sports
FIFA 21	1.11 million (Note: FIFA 21 sales breakdown: France – 1,119,086)	October 9, 2020	Sports	EA Canada; EA Bucharest	EA Sports
One Piece: Pirate Warriors 3	1.11 million	March 26, 2015	Action-adventure; Beat 'em up	Omega Force	Bandai Namco Entertainment
Code Vein	1.02 million	September 27, 2019	Action role-playing	Bandai Namco Studios; Shift	Bandai Namco Entertainment
Ark: Survival Evolved	1 million	August 29, 2017	Action-adventure; survival	Studio Wildcard	Studio Wildcard
Final Fantasy Type-0 HD	1 million	March 17, 2015	Action role-playing	Square Enix Business Division 2; HexaDrive	Square Enix
Kingdom Hearts III	1 million (Note: Kingdom Hearts III sales breakdown: Japan – 838,927 (retail))	January 25, 2019	Action role-playing	Square Enix	Square Enix
