= Mister Negative =

Fictional character in Marvel Comics

- Mister Negative. Art by Steve McNiven.

Publication information
- Publisher: Marvel Comics
- First appearance: Free Comic Book Day: The Amazing Spider-Man #1 (May 2007)
- Created by: Dan Slott; Phil Jimenez

In-story information
- Species: Human mutate
- Team affiliations: Inner Demons
- Notable aliases: Martin Li; Mister Negative
- Abilities: Criminal mastermind; Skilled hand-to-hand combatant; Darkforce grants: Superhuman strength and reflexes; Healing touch; Mind control; Object empowerment; Ability to switch between reversed and regular appearance

Mister Negative is a supervillain appearing in American comic books published by Marvel Comics. He is usually depicted as an enemy of Spider-Man, the Punisher, Shang-Chi, and Cloak and Dagger. The character was created by Dan Slott and Phil Jimenez and first appeared in "Swing Shift", a story in Free Comic Book Day: The Amazing Spider-Man #1 (May 2007). The name "Mister Negative" is a reference to photographic negative, as the colors of his skin, hair, and costume are inverted when he transforms into his alter ego.

Originally a gangster and human trafficker whose real name was never revealed, (Note: Martin Li is the name of a slave who was held on the Golden Mountain, a ship crewed by, among others, the future Mister Negative. Li died when the ship crashed near the New York shores, and Negative assumed his identity.) the man who would become Mister Negative was captured by the crime boss Silvermane to serve as a test subject for an experimental procedure involving a synthetic drug created by Simon Marshall. The experiment gave him control over both the Darkforce and the Lightforce and led to the creation of two opposite personalities: Mister Positive, posing as a benevolent and kind philanthropist named Martin Li, who establishes the F.E.A.S.T. Project as a means to help homeless people; and the ruthless crime lord Mister Negative, who leads the Inner Demons gang to try and take over New York City's criminal underworld. Originally, the character was depicted as suffering from dissociative identity disorder, as neither personality could access the other's memories; both were later shown to be fully aware of the other's existence. As Mister Negative, his powers include healing, mind-controlling people through "corruption", and charging weapons with his energy.

Since his original introduction in comics, the character has been adapted into several other forms of media. Keone Young, Eric Bauza, and Bowen Yang voiced Mister Negative in the animated series Ultimate Spider-Man, Spider-Man (2017), and Moon Girl and Devil Dinosaur, while Stephen Oyoung portrayed him in the Marvel's Spider-Man video game series.

== Publication history ==
Mister Negative was created by writer Dan Slott and artist Phil Jimenez and first appeared in Free Comic Book Day: The Amazing Spider-Man #1 (May 2007), which was set in the aftermath of the "Spider-Man: One More Day" storyline. The character then appeared in The Amazing Spider-Man #546 (January 2008), the first issue of the follow-up storyline "Spider-Man: Brand New Day".

== Fictional character biography ==
Martin Li is introduced with the backstory of a Chinese immigrant from Fujian who attempted to travel to America to be with his wife. His mode of transportation, the Golden Mountain, was a slave ship operated by the Snakehead gang as a way to sell Fujian captives as overseas slaves in Kenya. During a storm, the ship's crew evacuated, leaving the captives alone to make a break for the New York shores. Li was the only survivor and spent the following years building a large fortune and dedicating himself to helping those less fortunate.

The story is later revealed to be partially false, though only the Mister Negative persona appears aware of it. It is revealed that Negative was actually one of the crew members of the Golden Mountain. When the ship nearly crashed onto the New York shores, he stole the identity of one of the deceased Fujian slaves (the real Martin Li). This gang member was eventually captured by Silvermane and experimented on with a synthetic drug created by Maggia chemist Simon Marshall. He escaped with the help of two other experimental inmates and soon developed two personalities, the kind-hearted Martin Li and the villainous Mister Negative, the latter of the two developing the ability to generate a black electrical energy that could be used to heal, control others, or charge objects with his touch. The Mister Negative side dedicated himself to becoming Chinatown's Kingpin of Crime while the Martin Li side attempts to run the F.E.A.S.T. center with humility.

Martin Li opens and operates a soup kitchen in Chinatown: the F.E.A.S.T. Project (Food, Emergency Aid, Shelter and Training), where Peter Parker's Aunt May volunteers. Neither Peter nor May are aware of Li's dual identity as a Chinatown crime boss under the Mister Negative name. Despite being a crime lord, Li is a seemingly kind and generous man. The F.E.A.S.T. Project has displayed healing powers for people of various illnesses, although the cause of this healing has yet to be revealed.

In the "Brand New Day" storyline, Mister Negative first comes into conflict with Spider-Man when he makes a power play toward taking control of New York's criminal underworld by attempting to wipe out all existing members of the Karnelli and Maggia crime families using a bioweapon called Devil's Breath. In exchange for leaving the Maggia families' children alive, he takes a sample of Spider-Man's blood to use in a Devil's Breath formula. Spider-Man recruits Black Cat to help steal Spider-Man's remaining blood from Negative and replace it with a vial of pig blood so Negative is unaware of his loss.

Martin Li endorses Bill Hollister for mayor of New York City, putting him against Randall Crowne, adding him to a list of opponents (many of whom become targets of the villain Menace). It also causes him to become the target of a smear campaign by Dexter Bennet, editor of The DB and supporter of Crowne. After Menace is revealed to be Hollister's daughter and Hollister resigns as mayor, Li unsuccessfully runs in a special election, losing to J. Jonah Jameson.

Mister Negative eventually comes across Eddie Brock, giving Brock a job at his soup kitchen. A touch from him causes Brock's cancerous cells to completely disappear and combines with remnants of the Venom symbiote to create Anti-Venom. After the F.E.A.S.T center is torn apart during the fight between the two, Li discovers from a group of sweatshop workers (from a shop owned by Crowne) that they were experimented on with drugs made at Oscorp. Later, Negative and his Inner Demons encounter and battle Anti-Venom. In the aftermath, Brock watches Negative turn into Li, becoming the first to be aware of his double identity.

Negative refuses to submit to Hood's rule of conquest over New York's criminal underworld. During a meeting with Hood's henchman White Dragon, Negative corrupts White Dragon and sends the man to attack the Hood's headquarters. In retaliation, the Hood decides to attack and kill him. H.A.M.M.E.R. seals Chinatown on Hood's behalf and an all out fight breaks out around Li's estate. Hood's gang gets the upper hand until Spider-Man arrives to rescue Martin. However, Spider-Man too is corrupted and sent into battle on Negative's behalf. Spider-Man battles the members of Hood's gang who are attacking the villain's headquarters; Negative then sends the web-slinger to kill Betty Brant who is interviewing the real Martin Li's widow and is coming close to finding out the truth. The Hood himself then confronts Negative at his Chinatown headquarters and battles him. During the battle, Negative tries to corrupt Hood but fails. Norman Osborn ends the blockade H.A.M.M.E.R. has on Chinatown when Hammerhead hands papers implicating Oscorp in the aforementioned drug tests on immigrants. An irate Hood decides to kill Negative, but he escapes. A later conversation that Osborn has with his own darker Green Goblin side reveals that he now has an alliance with Negative similar to the one with Hood. However, Spot slips in and steals back the evidence of Oscorp's tests, revealing that he is working undercover in the Hood's gang.

During the "Big Time" storyline, Mister Negative is targeted by both Anti-Venom and the new Wraith. When they, along with Spider-Man, interrupt a heroin-smuggling operation, Wraith uses visual recognition software, linked to every television broadcast in New York, to publicly out Negative as Martin Li. When the police approach, Negative and his men retreat.

During the 2011 "Spider-Island" storyline, Mister Negative is told of a prophecy that he is destined to be killed by Dagger. Negative kidnaps Cloak and Dagger and uses his touch to change their powers, making Dagger use Darkforce and Cloak use Lightforce.

Following the 2015 "Secret Wars" storyline, Martin Li is arrested. He is rescued by Cloak and Dagger who have been corrupted by his touch and are using patches of the drug known as "Shade" to simulate the effects of Mister Negative's touch and "remain" loyal to him. After the two break Negative out of the prison ship where Li is being held and revert him to his Negative form, he has them bring him to Parker Industries' Shanghai branch, which leads to a confrontation with Spider-Man, whom Negative manages to touch. Although Peter exhibits an immunity to Negative's corruption power, Negative escapes to his Shanghai headquarters and reverts to Li. Li later sees a video message from Negative that he is targeting a philanthropist named Shen Quinghao, the former leader of the criminal Snakehead Syndicate which controlled the slave ship where Li became Negative, and makes a proposal to Li, which Li accepts. His plan fails, and after Cloak and Dagger are eventually freed from Negative's control, they vow to remain in Shanghai to protect it from Negative's future efforts.

A man claiming to be "Martin Li" shows up at the F.E.A.S.T. building seeking help as the Inner Demons attack. This "Martin Li" later surrenders to the Inner Demons. Mister Negative meets with Mayor Wilson Fisk and informs him that they will need the sister counterpart of the Tablet of Life and Destiny called the Tablet of Death and Entropy. As Negative has the item, he states to Fisk that their desired function can only be used when both items are together. Fisk allows Negative to control Chinatown and the Lower East Side.

In the series Spider-Boy, it is revealed that Madame Monstrosity previously hired Mister Negative and the Inner Demons to abduct people for her experiments. They kidnap Bailey Briggs and Eli Hartman, who Madame Monstrosity later transforms into Humanimals. When Madame Monstrosity asks how he will pay her, Negative advises her to turn all the men he brought her into his personal army and to do whatever she wants with. Madame Monstrosity accepts the offer and receives the "keys to his kingdom", which he expects her to eventually return. In the present, Negative learns that Christina Xu found the keys and sends the Inner Demons to reclaim them. Bailey, having since become the hero Spider-Boy, stops Negative, who is arrested.

== Powers and abilities ==
Prior to his transformation, "Martin Li" was a member of the Snakehead gang; his true name has not yet been revealed. Both the Martin Li and Mister Negative personae are the result of experimental drug tests by Maggia chemist Simon Marshall, the same tests that powered Cloak and Dagger. Unlike the two heroes, who were each given a power over light and dark, Negative was given both a light and dark side. As such, Negative considers himself an embodiment of black and wickedness and both of his personas view the balance of good and evil as a necessary part of the universe. The two halves, while fully aware of one another's existence, take no steps to interfere with one another. The Martin Li persona has taken such drastic steps as allowing his bad side to corrupt May Parker to keep it a secret.

During an encounter in The Amazing Spider-Man #621, Negative displays a degree of superhuman strength high enough to send Spider-Man flying through two buildings with a single blow. Negative also demonstrates superhuman reflexes during his battle with the Hood, dodging bullets or cutting them in half with his sword. He also has the power to charge up knives and swords with black electrical energy, a form of Darkforce energy, and he can corrupt people he touches in the same manner, bringing them under his control. The effectiveness of his corruption varies depending on how good the affected person was before their conversion: White Dragon, a villain himself, gained increased stamina and endurance, but was still easily dispatched (his clothes reverted to normal once he was killed). Conversely, Spider-Man, a hero in every respect, was corrupted into a spiteful and angry villain, despising every value he held dear (even his Uncle Ben's memory) and no more above killing. Spider-Man is able to break the hold his malevolent side has over him when he is on the verge of killing Betty Brant, as he remembers the love he once had for her upon getting close. Negative's corrupting touch appears to be ineffective against beings with supernatural powers, as Hood is unaffected when Negative attempts to corrupt him; Negative claims that this is because the Hood's soul belongs to Dormammu, a being even darker than he is. It has since been revealed that while Negative can renew his influence on others, he cannot corrupt someone once that individual has broken free of his influence already, allowing Peter Parker to infiltrate his plan by using the fact that he had been corrupted by Negative as Spider-Man without his foe knowing his secret identity.

Mister Negative's alternate Martin Li persona seems to have the power to cure others: in The Amazing Spider-Man #568, a simple touch from Li completely cures Eddie Brock of his cancer and combines the remnants of the Venom symbiote in his blood with his white blood cells, creating a new symbiote named Anti-Venom that possesses similar healing powers. Aside from this, homeless people who have stayed at Martin Li's shelter have rapidly recovered from any illnesses or injuries they suffered from. It is possible that his healing touch is supposed to be the opposite of Negative's corrupting touch. It is revealed that Anti-Venom can be affected by Negative's energy because it negates his healing ability.

Mister Negative also has access to advanced technology and secret laboratories, in which he is able to give his subjects medical care far more advanced than that available to the general public.

== Reception ==
In 2020, CBR.com included Mister Negative in their "Spider-Man: The Best New Villains of the Century" list.

== Other versions ==
=== Infinity Wars ===
Dagger Li, a composite character based on Mister Negative and Dagger, appears in Infinity Wars.

=== Spider-Ham ===
Mr. Negatiger, a funny animal version of Mister Negative from Earth-8311, appears in the graphic novel Hollywood May-ham.

=== Ultimate Universe ===
An alternate universe version of Mister Negative from Earth-6160 appears in Ultimate Spider-Man (2024). This version is a lieutenant and associate of Wilson Fisk who controls Queens on his behalf. In response to emerging vigilantes Spider-Man and the Green Goblin threatening Fisk's operations, Negative joins his Sinister Six to eliminate them.

== In other media ==
=== Television ===
- A Marvel Noir-inspired alternate universe version of Mister Negative appears in the Ultimate Spider-Man (2012) episode "Return to the Spider-Verse", voiced by Keone Young. This version is a henchman of Hammerhead who obtains his powers from a fragment of the Siege Perilous.
- Mister Negative appears in the Spider-Man (2017) episode "Brand New Day", voiced by Eric Bauza.
- Mister Negative appears in the Moon Girl and Devil Dinosaur episode "Party Girl", voiced by Bowen Yang. This version is a luxury condo magnate who aims to have the best high-end apartment home.

=== Video games ===
- Mister Negative appears as a playable character in Marvel Strike Force.
- Mister Negative appears as a playable character in Marvel Contest of Champions.
- Mister Negative appears as a playable character in Lego Marvel Super Heroes 2 via the "Cloak and Dagger" DLC.
- Mister Negative appears as a boss in Spider-Man (2018), voiced by Stephen Oyoung. This version gained his powers from Norman Osborn's experimentation with the Devil's Breath virus and subsequently killed his parents after losing control of them. In the present, he seeks revenge on Osborn and leads his Inner Demons gang to take over the Kingpin's former territories, all the while maintaining the public persona of Martin Li, the benevolent founder of F.E.A.S.T. While attempting to seize and unleash the Devil's Breath, Li is stopped by Spider-Man and arrested. He is later broken out of prison by Otto Octavius and joins his Sinister Six to continue pursuing his vendetta against Osborn, until Spider-Man defeats him again.
- Mister Negative appears as a boss in Spider-Man 2, voiced again by Stephen Oyoung. Amidst a prison transfer, he is kidnapped by Kraven the Hunter and forced to fight in gladiatorial battles. He eventually faces the new Spider-Man, Miles Morales, who resents Li for his role in the death of his father, Jefferson Davis. Morales defeats Li, but overcomes his desire for revenge and helps him escape. Li later assists the Spider-Men in defeating Kraven and Venom before willingly turning himself over to the authorities and returning to prison.
- Mister Negative appears in Marvel Snap.
- Mister Negative appears in Marvel Puzzle Quest.

== Collected editions ==
Title	Material Collected	Published Date	ISBN
Dark Reign: The Underside	Dark Reign: Mister Negative #1–3 and Dark Reign: Lethal Legion #1–3, Dark Reign: Zodiac #1–3, Dark Reign: Made Men	December 23, 2009	978-0785141600
Dark Reign: Mister Negative	Dark Reign: Mister Negative #1–3	March 25, 2010	978-0785141648
Spider-Man: Brand New Day — The Complete Collection Vol. 4	Dark Reign: Mister Negative #1–3 and Amazing Spider-Man #592–601 and Annual #36, Spider-Man: The Short Halloween, Amazing Spider-Man: American Son Sketchbook and material from Amazing Spider-Man Family #7	December 20, 2017	978-1302907990
