= List of Spider-Man enemies in other media =

The comic book character Spider-Man has had much media attention due to his popularity as a superhero, as have his villains. Here is a list of his primary villains that have undergone media attention, such as in films, television, and video games, as well as some villains who debuted in the TV series.

== Film ==
This is a list of Spider-Man enemies that have been in Sam Raimi's Spider-Man film trilogy, Marc Webb's The Amazing Spider-Man films, the Marvel Cinematic Universe (MCU), and Sony's Spider-Man Universe.

The movies in the original trilogy also introduce Dylan Baker as Dr. Curt Connors, the man who in the comics becomes the Lizard. Still, this transformation never took place during Raimi's tenure as director. Mendel Stromm was portrayed by actor Ron Perkins in Spider-Man. However, he did not become a villain while Spider-Man 2 features Daniel Gillies as John Jameson, whose transformation into the Man-Wolf is not depicted in the film. Additionally, the Kingpin was featured prominently in the Mark Steven Johnson film Daredevil, where he was portrayed by Michael Clarke Duncan.

In The Amazing Spider-Man, the Lizard is the villain. Irrfan Khan also portrays the antagonistic Dr. Ratha in that film. In The Amazing Spider-Man 2, Felicity Jones plays Felicia Hardy, the alter ego of Black Cat, but her version of Black Cat was never shown.

In Spider-Man: Homecoming, Michael Mando appears as Mac Gargan, but did not become Scorpion, eventually donning the mantle in Spider-Man: Brand New Day. In Spider-Man: Far From Home, Jake Gyllenhaal portrays Mysterio, who was originally to be played by Bruce Campbell in Raimi's canceled fourth film.

=== Live-action ===
Villain	Film	Actor
Janice Lincoln; Beetle	Spider-Man: Far From Home	Claire Rushbrook
Felicia Hardy; Black Cat	The Amazing Spider-Man 2	Felicity Jones
Dennis Carradine; Burglar	Spider-Man (2002); Spider-Man 3 The Amazing Spider-Man (2012)	Michael Papajohn Leif Gantvoort
Calypso Ezili; Calypso	Kraven the Hunter (2024)	Ariana DeBose
Cletus Kasady; Carnage	Venom (2018); Venom: Let There Be Carnage	Woody Harrelson
Dmitri Smerdyakov; Chameleon	Spider-Man: Far From Home Kraven the Hunter (2024)	Numan Acar Fred Hechinger
Randy Vale; Darter	Spider-Man: Homecoming	Christopher Berry
Dr. Otto Octavius; Doctor Octopus	Spider-Man 2 Spider-Man: No Way Home	Alfred Molina
Donald Menken	The Amazing Spider-Man 2	Colm Feore
Max Dillon; Electro	The Amazing Spider-Man 2 Spider-Man: No Way Home	Jamie Foxx
Karl Fiers; Finisher	The Amazing Spider-Man 2	Bill Heck
Kris Keating; Foreigner	Kraven the Hunter (2024)	Christopher Abbott
Gustav Fiers; Gentleman	The Amazing Spider-Man (2012); The Amazing Spider-Man 2	Michael Massee
Harry Osborn; Green Goblin	Spider-Man (2002); Spider-Man 2 Spider-Man 3 The Amazing Spider-Man 2	James Franco Dane DeHaan
Norman Osborn; Green Goblin	Spider-Man (2002); Spider-Man 2 Spider-Man 3 Spider-Man: No Way Home The Amazing Spider-Man 2	Willem Dafoe Chris Cooper
Ned Leeds; Hobgoblin	Spider-Man: Homecoming; Avengers: Infinity War; Avengers: Endgame; Spider-Man: Far From Home; Spider-Man: No Way Home; Spider-Man: Brand New Day	Jacob Batalon
Wilson Fisk; Kingpin	The Trial of the Incredible Hulk Daredevil (film)	John Rhys-Davies Michael Clarke Duncan
Knull	Venom: The Last Dance	Andy Serkis
Sergei Kravinoff; Kraven the Hunter	Kraven the Hunter (2024)	Aaron Taylor-Johnson
Dr. Curt Connors; Lizard	Spider-Man 2 Spider-Man 3 The Amazing Spider-Man (2012); Spider-Man: No Way Home	Dylan Baker Rhys Ifans
John Jameson; Man-Wolf	Spider-Man 2 Venom (2018)	Daniel Gillies Chris O'Hara
Dr. Michael Morbius; Morbius, the Living Vampire	Blade (1998) Morbius (2022)	Stephen Norrington Jared Leto
Quentin Beck; Mysterio	Spider-Man: Far From Home; Spider-Man: No Way Home	Jake Gyllenhaal
Aaron Davis; Prowler	Spider-Man: Homecoming Spider-Man: Across the Spider-Verse (Note: Donald Glover cameos as the character in live-action form.)	Donald Glover
Frank Castle; Punisher	The Punisher (1989) The Punisher (2004) Punisher: War Zone The Punisher: One Last Kill; Spider-Man: Brand New Day	Dolph Lundgren Thomas Jane Ray Stevenson Jon Bernthal
Dr. Ashley Kafka; Queen Goblin	The Amazing Spider-Man 2	Marton Csokas
Aleksei Sytsevich; Rhino	The Amazing Spider-Man 2 Kraven the Hunter (2024)	Paul Giamatti Alessandro Nivola
Carlton Drake; Riot	Venom (2018)	Riz Ahmed
Professor Mendel Stromm; Robot-Master	Spider-Man (2002) Superhero Movie (2008)	Ron Perkins Brent Spiner
Flint Marko; Sandman	Spider-Man 3 Spider-Man: No Way Home	Thomas Haden Church
Mac Gargan; Scorpion	Spider-Man: Homecoming; Spider-Man: Brand New Day	Michael Mando
Liz Allan; Screwball	Spider-Man (2002) Spider-Man: Homecoming	Sally Livingstone Laura Harrier
Anne Weying; She-Venom	Venom (2018); Venom: Let There Be Carnage	Michelle Williams
Herman Schultz; Shocker II	Spider-Man: Homecoming	Bokeem Woodbine
Jackson Brice; Shocker I	Spider-Man: Homecoming	Logan Marshall Green
Frances Barrison; Shriek	Venom: Let There Be Carnage	Naomie Harris
Antonia Dreykov; Taskmaster	Black Widow; Thunderbolts*	Olga Kurylenko
Phineas Mason; Tinkerer	Spider-Man: Homecoming	Michael Chernus
Lonnie Lincoln; Tombstone	Spider-Man: Brand New Day	Marvin "Krondon" Jones III
Patrick Mulligan; Toxin	Venom: Let There Be Carnage; Venom: The Last Dance	Sean Delaney; Stephen Graham
Alistair Smythe; Ultimate Spider-Slayer	The Amazing Spider-Man 2	B. J. Novak
Eddie Brock; Venom	Spider-Man 3 Venom (2018); Venom: Let There Be Carnage; Spider-Man: No Way Home; Venom: The Last Dance	Topher Grace Tom Hardy
Adrian Toomes; Vulture	Spider-Man: Homecoming; Morbius (2022)	Michael Keaton

=== Animation ===
Villain	Film	Actor
Richard Fisk; Blood Rose	Spider-Man: Into the Spider-Verse	Basement photo cameo
Olivia Octavius; Doctor Octopus	Spider-Man: Into the Spider-Verse	Kathryn Hahn
Otto Octavius; Doctor Octopus	Spider-Man: Into the Spider-Verse; Spider-Man: Across the Spider-Verse	non-speaking cameo
Otto Octavius; The Superior Spider-Man	Spider-Man: Across the Spider-Verse	non-speaking cameo
Norman Osborn; Green Goblin	Spider-Man: Into the Spider-Verse Spider-Man: Across the Spider-Verse	Jorma Taccone non-speaking cameo
Dmitri Smerdyakov; Chameleon	Spider-Man: Into the Spider-Verse Spider-Man: Across the Spider-Verse	non-speaking cameo
Daniel Brito; Fancy Dan	Spider-Man: Into the Spider-Verse Spider-Man: Across the Spider-Verse	non-speaking cameos
Joseph Martello; Hammerhead	Spider-Man: Into the Spider-Verse Spider-Man: Across the Spider-Verse	non-speaking cameos
Wilson Fisk; Kingpin	Spider-Man: Into the Spider-Verse Spider-Man: Across the Spider-Verse	Liev Schreiber
Peter Parker; Lizard	Spider-Man: Into the Spider-Verse Spider-Man: Across the Spider-Verse	non-speaking cameo Jack Quaid
Jackson Brice; Montana	Spider-Man: Into the Spider-Verse Spider-Man: Across the Spider-Verse	non-speaking cameo
Raymond Bloch; Ox	Spider-Man: Into the Spider-Verse Spider-Man: Across the Spider-Verse	Basement photo cameo
Aaron Davis; Prowler	Spider-Man: Into the Spider-Verse Spider-Man: Across the Spider-Verse	Mahershala Ali
Frank Castle; Punisher	Iron Man: Rise of Technovore Avengers Confidential: Black Widow & Punisher	Norman Reedus Brian Bloom
Maximus Gargan; Scorpion	Spider-Man: Into the Spider-Verse	Joaquín Cosío
Herman Schultz; Shocker	Spider-Man: Into the Spider-Verse; Spider-Man: Across the Spider-Verse	Earth-1610B, Captured by Spider-Society and Earth-42
Jonathan Ohnn; Spot	Spider-Man: Into the Spider-Verse; Spider-Man: Across the Spider-Verse	non-speaking cameo Jason Schwartzman
Lonnie Lincoln; Tombstone	Spider-Man: Into the Spider-Verse; Spider-Man: Beyond the Spider-Verse	Marvin "Krondon" Jones III
Adrian Toomes; Vulture	Spider-Man: Across the Spider-Verse	Jorma Taccone

== Television ==
Several Spider-Man villains have made appearances in Spider-Man animated television series, other Marvel Comics related shows, the Marvel Cinematic Universe (MCU), and Sony's Spider-Man Universe. Vincent D'Onofrio portrays the Kingpin in Marvel Television's Netflix series Daredevil and the Disney+ series Hawkeye, Echo, and Daredevil: Born Again. Jon Bernthal portrays the Punisher in Marvel Television's Netflix series Daredevil and The Punisher as well as the Disney+ series Daredevil: Born Again. Also, in Wolverine and the X-Men, there was a character that closely resembles Shadrac. Here is a listing in alphabetical order.

=== Live-action ===
Villain	Television	Actor
Black Cat; Cat Hardy	Spider-Noir	Li Jun Li (alter ego only) (Marvel Noir version)
Kingpin; Wilson Fisk	Daredevil (TV series); Hawkeye (TV series); Echo (TV series); Daredevil: Born Again	Vincent D'Onofrio
Megawatt; Dirk Leyden	Spider-Noir	Andrew Lewis Caldwell (Marvel Noir version)
Owl; Leland Owlsley	Daredevil (TV series)	Bob Gunton
Punisher; Frank Castle	Daredevil (TV series); The Punisher (TV series); Daredevil: Born Again	Jon Bernthal
Sandman; Flint Marko	Spider-Noir	Jack Huston (Marvel Noir version)
Silvermane; Finbar "Finn" Byrne	Spider-Noir	Brendan Gleeson (Marvel Noir version)
Tombstone; Lonnie Lincoln	Spider-Noir	Abraham Popoola (Marvel Noir version)

=== Animation ===
Villain	Television	Actor
Anti-Venom; Symbiote	Ultimate Spider-Man (TV series) Spider-Man (2017 TV series)	Matt Lanter (Harry Osborn) Connor Andrade (Groot)
Beetle; Abner Jenkins	Spider-Man and His Amazing Friends Iron Man (TV series) Ultimate Spider-Man (TV series) Spider-Man (2017 TV series)	Christopher Collins John Reilly Steven Blum Fred Tatasciore
Boomerang; Fred Myers	The Marvel Super Heroes The Avengers: United They Stand Ultimate Spider-Man (TV series)	Ed McNamara Rob Cowan Rob Paulsen
Big Man; Frederick Foswell	Spider-Man (1967 TV series) The Spectacular Spider-Man (TV series)	N/A (alter ego only) James Arnold Taylor (alter ego only)
Big Wheel; Jackson Wheele	Spider-Man: The Animated Series Spider-Man (2017 TV series)	Michael Des Barres Mentioned
Black Cat; Felicia Hardy	Spider-Man (1981 TV series) Spider-Man: The Animated Series (reformed) The Spectacular Spider-Man (TV series) Spider-Man (2017 TV series) Spidey and His Amazing Friends	Morgan Lofting Jennifer Hale Tricia Helfer Grey Griffin Jaiden Klein
Burglar	Spider-Man (1967 TV series); Spider-Man (1981 TV series); Spider-Man and His Amazing Friends; Spider-Man: The Animated Series Spider-Man Unlimited The Spectacular Spider-Man (TV series) Ultimate Spider-Man (TV series) Spider-Man (2017 TV series)	N/A N/A (show theme) Jim Cummings; James Remar N/A Benjamin Diskin
Calypso; Calypso Ezili	Spider-Man: The Animated Series The Spectacular Spider-Man (TV series)	Susan Beauban Angela Bryant
Carnage; Cletus Kasady	Spider-Man: The Animated Series Spider-Man Unlimited The Spectacular Spider-Man (TV series)	Scott Cleverdon Michael Donovan N/A (alter ego only)
Carnage; Symbiote	Ultimate Spider-Man (TV series) Guardians of the Galaxy (TV series)	Dee Bradley Baker (Spider-Man and Doc Ock); Fred Tatasciore (Hulk); Tara Strong (Spider-Woman) Isaac C. Singleton Jr. (Thanos)
Chameleon; Dmitri Smerdyakov	The Marvel Super Heroes Spider-Man (1981 TV series) Spider-Man and His Amazing Friends Spider-Man: The Animated Series The Spectacular Spider-Man (TV series) Spider-Man (2017 TV series) Your Friendly Neighborhood Spider-Man	Tom Harvey John H. Mayer Hans Conried Jim Cummings Steven Blum Patton Oswalt Roger Craig Smith
Clash; Clayton Cole	Spider-Man (2017 TV series)	Yuri Lowenthal
Doctor Octopus; Otto Octavius	Spider-Man (1967 TV series) Spider-Man (1981 TV series) The Incredible Hulk (1982 TV series); Spider-Man and His Amazing Friends Spider-Man: The Animated Series Spider-Man Unlimited Robot Chicken The Spectacular Spider-Man (TV series) Ultimate Spider-Man (TV series); Hulk and the Agents of S.M.A.S.H. Lego Marvel Super Heroes: Maximum Overload Marvel Disk Wars: The Avengers Spider-Man (2017 TV series) (reformed) Marvel Super Hero Adventures Your Friendly Neighborhood Spider-Man	Vernon Chapman Stan Jones Michael Bell Efrem Zimbalist Jr. N/A Seth Green Peter MacNicol Tom Kenny Dai Matsumoto Scott Menville Luc Roderique Hugh Dancy
Dracula; Vlad Dracula	Spider-Woman (TV series) Spider-Man and His Amazing Friends The Super Hero Squad Show Ultimate Spider-Man (TV series); Hulk and the Agents of S.M.A.S.H. Avengers Assemble (TV series)	N/A G. Stanley Jones Dave Boat Corey Burton
Electro; Francine Frye	Spider-Man (2017 TV series) Spidey and His Amazing Friends	Daisy Lightfoot Stephanie Lemelin
Electro; Max Dillon	The Marvel Super Heroes Spider-Man (1967 TV series) Spider-Man and His Amazing Friends Spider-Man: The Animated Series Spider-Man Unlimited Spider-Man: The New Animated Series The Spectacular Spider-Man (TV series) Ultimate Spider-Man (TV series) Marvel Super Hero Adventures	N/A Tom Harvey Allan Melvin Philip Proctor Dale Wilson (Counter Earth version) Ethan Embry Crispin Freeman Christopher Daniel Barnes Ian James Corlett
Enforcers	Spider-Man (1967 TV series); Ox; Cowboy The Spectacular Spider-Man (TV series); Montana/Shocker; Ox; Fancy Dan/Ricochet Ultimate Spider-Man (TV series); Montana; Ox; Fancy Dan	N/A; N/A Jeff Bennett; Clancy Brown, Danny Trejo; Phil LaMarr Steven Weber; Mark Hamill; Troy Baker
Green Goblin; Harry Osborn	Spider-Man: The Animated Series Spider-Man: The New Animated Series The Spectacular Spider-Man (TV series) Ultimate Spider-Man (TV series) Spider-Man (2017 TV series) Your Friendly Neighborhood Spider-Man	Gary Imhoff Ian Ziering (alter ego only) James Arnold Taylor (alter ego only) Matt Lanter (alter ego only) Max Mittelman (alter ego only) Zeno Robinson (alter ego only)
Green Goblin; Norman Osborn	Spider-Man (1967 TV series) Spider-Man (1981 TV series); Spider-Man: The Animated Series Spider-Man and His Amazing Friends Spider-Man Unlimited The Spectacular Spider-Man (TV series) Ultimate Spider-Man (TV series) Marvel Disk Wars: The Avengers Marvel Future Avengers Spider-Man (2017 TV series); Lego Marvel Spider-Man: Vexed by Venom Marvel Super Hero Adventures Spidey and His Amazing Friends Your Friendly Neighborhood Spider-Man	Len Carlson Neil Ross Dennis Marks Rino Romano (Counter Earth version) Alan Rachins, Steve Blum Steven Weber Yusuke Numata Dave Wittenberg Josh Keaton Sam Vincent J. P. Karliak Colman Domingo (alter ego only)
Grizzly; Maxwell Markham	Ultimate Spider-Man	John DiMaggio
Hammerhead; Joseph Martello	Spider-Man (1981 TV series) Spider-Man: The Animated Series The Spectacular Spider-Man (TV series) Ultimate Spider-Man (TV series) Spider-Man (2017 TV series)	William Boyett Nicky Blair John DiMaggio Jon Polito (Marvel Noir version) Jim Cummings
Hippo	Spider-Man (2017 TV series)	Zack Shada
Hobgoblin; Harry Osborn	Spider-Man (2017 TV series)	Max Mittelman
Hobgoblin; Jason Macendale	Spider-Man: The Animated Series	Mark Hamill
Hobgoblin; Roderick Kingsley	The Spectacular Spider-Man (TV series) Marvel Super Hero Adventures	N/A (alter ego only) Andrew Francis
Human Fly; Richard Deacon	Spider-Man and His Amazing Friends	N/A
Hydro-Man; Morris Bench	Spider-Man: The Animated Series Fantastic Four (1994 TV series) The Spectacular Spider-Man (TV series) Ultimate Spider-Man (TV series) Spidey and His Amazing Friends	Rob Paulsen Brad Garrett Bill Fagerbakke (alter ego only) James Arnold Taylor Haley Joel Osment
Jackal; Miles Warren	Spider-Man: The Animated Series The Spectacular Spider-Man (TV series)	Jonathan Harris (alter ego only) Brian George (alter ego only)
Jackal; Raymond Warren	Spider-Man (2017 TV series)	John DiMaggio
Jack O'Lantern	Ultimate Spider-Man (TV series) Spider-Man (2017 TV series)	Drake Bell Booboo Stewart
Kangaroo; Brian Hibbs	Ultimate Spider-Man (TV series)	N/A
Kangaroo; Frank Oliver	X-Men (TV series)	N/A
Kingpin; Wilson Fisk	Spider-Man (1967 TV series) Spider-Woman (TV series) Spider-Man (1981 TV series) Spider-Man and His Amazing Friends Spider-Man: The Animated Series Spider-Man: The New Animated Series	Tom Harvey N/A Stan Jones Walker Edmiston Roscoe Lee Browne Michael Clarke Duncan
Knull	Spider-Man (2017 TV series)	N/A
Kraven the Hunter; Sergei Kravinoff	The Marvel Super Heroes Spider-Man (1981 TV series) Spider-Man and His Amazing Friends Spider-Man: The Animated Series Spider-Man Unlimited Spider-Man: The New Animated Series The Spectacular Spider-Man (TV series) Ultimate Spider-Man (TV series) Spider-Man (2017 TV series); Avengers Assemble (TV series)	Chris Wiggins Jack DeLeon Robert Ridgely Gregg Berger Paul Dobson (Counter Earth version) Michael Dorn Eric Vesbit Diedrich Bader Troy Baker
Lady Octopus; Carolyn Trainor	Spider-Man (2017 TV series) Spidey and His Amazing Friends	Kari Wahlgren Kelly Ohanian
Living Brain	Spider-Man (2017 TV series)	Scott Menville
Lizard; Carla Connors	Your Friendly Neighborhood Spider-Man	Zehra Fazal
Lizard; Curt Connors	Spider-Man (1967 TV series) Spider-Man (1981 TV series) Spider-Man: The Animated Series Spider-Man: The New Animated Series The Spectacular Spider-Man (TV series) Ultimate Spider-Man (TV series) Marvel Disk Wars: The Avengers Spider-Man (2017 TV series) Spidey and His Amazing Friends	Gillie Fenwick N/A Joseph Campanella Rob Zombie Dee Bradley Baker Tom Kenny; Dee Bradley Baker Yusuke Handa Yuri Lowenthal Bumper Robinson
Mania; Symbiote	Spider-Man (2017 TV series)	Carla Jeffery
Man Mountain Marko; Michael Marko	Spider-Man (1981 TV series)	Jack Angel
Man-Wolf; John Jameson	Spider-Man: The Animated Series Spider-Man Unlimited The Spectacular Spider-Man (TV series) Ultimate Spider-Man (TV series) Spider-Man (2017 TV series)	Michael Horton (alter ego only) John Payne, Scott McNeil Daran Norris (alter ego only) Nolan North Josh Keaton
Mister Negative; Martin Li	Ultimate Spider-Man (TV series) Spider-Man (2017 TV series)	Keone Young (Marvel Noir version) Eric Bauza
Molten Man; Mark Raxton	The Spectacular Spider-Man (TV series) Ultimate Spider-Man (TV series) Spider-Man (2017 TV series)	Eric Lopez James Arnold Taylor Imari Williams
Morbius the Living Vampire; Michael Morbius	Spider-Man: The Animated Series Ultimate Spider-Man (TV series)	Nick Jameson Benjamin Diskin
Mysterio; Francis Beck	Ultimate Spider-Man (TV series)	Mary Kate Wiles
Mysterio; Quentin Beck	Spider-Man (1967 TV series) Spider-Man (1981 TV series) Spider-Man and His Amazing Friends Spider-Man: The Animated Series The Spectacular Spider-Man (TV series) Ultimate Spider-Man (TV series) Spider-Man (2017 TV series) What If...? (TV series)	Chris Wiggins Michael Rye Peter Cullen Gregg Berger Xander Berkeley Paul Scheer Crispin Freeman Alejandro Saab
Overdrive	Spider-Man (2017 TV series)	Ryan Blaney
Panda-Mania	Spider-Man (2017 TV series)	Teala Dunn
Prowler; Hobie Brown	Spider-Man: The Animated Series The Spectacular Spider-Man (TV series) Spider-Man (2017 TV series)	Tim Russ Charles Duckworth (alter ego only) Nathaniel J. Potvin
Puma; Thomas Fireheart	Spider-Man (2017 TV series)	N/A
Punisher; Frank Castle	Spider-Man: The Animated Series The Super Hero Squad Show Avengers Assemble	John Beck Ray Stevenson N/A
Regent; Augustus Roman	Spider-Man (2017 TV series)	Imari Williams
Rhino; Aleksei Sytsevich	Spider-Man (1967 TV series) Spider-Man: The Animated Series The Spectacular Spider-Man (TV series) Ultimate Spider-Man (TV series) Spider-Man (2017 TV series) Marvel Super Hero Adventures Spidey and His Amazing Friends Your Friendly Neighborhood Spider-Man	Ed McNamera Don Stark Clancy Brown Daryl Sabara; Max Mittelman Matthew Mercer N/A Justin Shenkarow TBA
Richard Fisk	Spider-Man: The Animated Series	Nick Jameson
Sandgirl; Keemia Alvarado	Spider-Man (2017 TV series)	Sofia Carson
Sandman; Flint Marko	Spider-Man (1967 TV series) Fantastic Four (1978 TV series) Spider-Man (1981 TV series) Spider-Man and His Amazing Friends The Spectacular Spider-Man (TV series) Ultimate Spider-Man (TV series) Spider-Man (2017 TV series) Spidey and His Amazing Friends	Tom Harvey NA Neil Ross Christopher Collins John DiMaggio Dee Bradley Baker Travis Willingham Thomas F. Wilson
Scorn; Symbiote	Spider-Man (2017 TV series)	Kylee Russell
Scorpion; Mac Gargan	Spider-Man (1967 TV series) Spider-Man and His Amazing Friends Spider-Man: The Animated Series Spider-Man (2017 TV series) Your Friendly Neighborhood Spider-Man	Carl Banas N/A Martin Landau; Richard Moll Jason Spisak Jonathan Medina
Scorpion	Ultimate Spider-Man (TV series)	Dante Basco (identity only); Eric Bauza (identity only)
Scream; Symbiote	Spider-Man (2017 TV series)	Meg Donnelly
Shocker; Herman Schultz	Spider-Man and His Amazing Friends Spider-Man: The Animated Series Ultimate Spider-Man (TV series) Spider-Man (2017 TV series)	John Stephenson Jim Cummings Troy Baker Cameron Boyce
Shocker; Jackson Brice	The Spectacular Spider-Man (TV series)	Jeff Bennett (identity only)
Shriek; Frances Barrison	Ultimate Spider-Man (TV series)	Ashley Eckstein
Silvermane; Silvio Manfredi	Spider-Man (1981 TV series) Spider-Man: The Animated Series The Spectacular Spider-Man (TV series) Spider-Man (2017 TV series)	Paul Winchell Jeff Corey; Townsend Coleman (young man); Matthew McCurly (child) Miguel Ferrer Nolan North
Silver Sable; Silver Sablinova	Spider-Man: The Animated Series Spider-Man: The New Animated Series The Spectacular Spider-Man (TV series) Spider-Man (2017 TV series)	Mira Furlan Virginia Madsen Nikki Cox April Stewart
Slyde; Jalome Beacher	Spider-Man (2017 TV series)	Phil LaMarr
Spencer Smythe	Spider-Man: The Animated Series Spider-Man (2017 TV series)	Edward Mulhare Benjamin Diskin
Spider-Carnage	Spider-Man: The Animated Series	Christopher Daniel Barnes
Spider-Slayer	Spider-Man (1967 TV series) Spider-Man: The Animated Series Ultimate Spider-Man (TV series) Spider-Man (2017 TV series)	N/A N/A Drake Bell (Kaine); Imari Williams (Bone Spider, Goliath Spider); Roger Craig Smith (Ghost Spider) N/A
Spot; Jonathan Ohnn	Spider-Man: The Animated Series Spider-Man (2017 TV series)	Oliver Muirhead Crispin Freeman
Stegron; Vincent Stegron	Marvel Super Hero Adventures	Mark Oliver
Swarm; Fritz von Meyer	Spider-Man and His Amazing Friends Marvel Super Hero Adventures	Al Fann Ian James Corlett
Swarm; Jefferson Davis	Spider-Man (2017 TV series)	Alex Désert
Swarm; Michael Tan	Ultimate Spider-Man (TV series)	Eric Bauza; Drake Bell
Swarm	Spidey and His Amazing Friends Iron Man and His Awesome Friends	Vanessa Bayer
Tarantula; Maria Vasquez	Your Friendly Neighborhood Spider-Man	Anairis Quiñones
Taskmaster; Tony Masters	Ultimate Spider-Man (TV series); Avengers Assemble (TV series)	Clancy Brown
Tinkerer; Phineas Mason	The Spectacular Spider-Man (TV series) Spider-Man (2017 TV series) Marvel Super Hero Adventures	Thom Adcox-Hernandez Aaron Abrams Michael Daingerfield
Tombstone; Lonnie Lincoln	Spider-Man: The Animated Series The Spectacular Spider-Man (TV series) Your Friendly Neighborhood Spider-Man	Dorian Harewood Keith David; Kevin Michael Richardson Eugene Byrd (alter ego only)
Ultimate Spider-Slayer; Alistair Smythe	Spider-Man: The Animated Series Spider-Man (2017 TV series)	Maxwell Caulfield Jason Spisak
Venom; Eddie Brock	Spider-Man: The Animated Series Spider-Man Unlimited The Spectacular Spider-Man (TV series) Lego Marvel Super Heroes: Maximum Overload Spider-Man (2017 TV series)	Hank Azaria Brian Drummond Benjamin Diskin Dee Bradley Baker Ben Pronsky
Venom; Flash Thompson	Spider-Man and His Amazing Friends Spider-Man: The Animated Series Spider-Man: The New Animated Series The Spectacular Spider-Man (TV series) Ultimate Spider-Man (TV series) Spider-Man (2017 TV series)	Frank Welker (alter ego only) Patrick Labyorteaux (alter ego only) Devon Sawa (alter ego only) Joshua LeBar (alter ego only) Matt Lanter Benjamin Diskin
Venom; Symbiote	Ultimate Spider-Man (TV series); Hulk and the Agents of S.M.A.S.H. Avengers Assemble (TV series) Marvel Disk Wars: The Avengers Guardians of the Galaxy (TV series); Spider-Man (2017 TV series) Marvel Super Hero Adventures Spidey and His Amazing Friends Your Friendly Neighborhood Spider-Man	Matt Lanter (Harry Osborn); Steven Weber (Green Goblin); Benjamin Diskin (Skaar); Eliza Dushku (She-Hulk); Seth Green (A-Bomb); Clancy Brown (Red Hulk); Fred Tatasciore (Hulk); Corey Burton (Dracula) N/A N/A; Sofia Wylie (Ironheart); Aubrey Joseph (Cloak); Olivia Holt (Dagger); Connor Andrade (Groot); Ki Hong Lee (Amadeus Cho); Liam O'Brien (Doctor Strange); Mick Wingert (Iron Man); Roger Craig Smith (Captain America); Grey Griffin (Captain Marvel) N/A Ben Pronsky Kellen Goff
Vulture; Adrian Toomes	Spider-Man (1967 TV series) Spider-Man (1981 TV series) Spider-Man: The Animated Series Spider-Man Unlimited The Spectacular Spider-Man (TV series) Ultimate Spider-Man (TV series) Spider-Man (2017 TV series); Avengers Assemble (TV series)	Gillie Fenwick Don Messick Eddie Albert Scott McNeil (Counter Earth version) Robert Englund Tom Kenny Alastair Duncan
White Rabbit; Lorina Dodson	Your Friendly Neighborhood Spider-Man	TBA

=== Sinister Six ===
A few of Spider-Man villains in other media have joined the group Sinister Six (or Insidious Six in Spider-Man: The Animated Series and Sinister Seven or Superior Sinister Six in Ultimate Spider-Man) to take down Spider-Man just like in the comics. Here is a list of villains who have joined. The numbers beside the supervillain with the parentheses in between them stand for their first meeting, second meeting, and so on. There has never been a proper depiction of the original Sinister Six (Doctor Octopus, Mysterio, Vulture, Sandman, Kraven, and Electro), but in most franchises, all of the members appear, mainly without joining.

Show	Members	Leader
Spider-Man: The Animated Series This version features several original members, though not all. This group is organized by Kingpin, though he is not a member.	Chameleon (1st) (2nd); Doctor Octopus (1st) (2nd); Mysterio (1st); Rhino (1st) (2nd); Scorpion (1st) (2nd); Shocker (1st) (2nd); Vulture (2nd)	Kingpin
The Spectacular Spider-Man This series is the most faithful to the source material, with the only unoriginal members being Shocker and Rhino.	Doctor Octopus (1st) (2nd); Electro (1st) (2nd); Kraven (2nd); Mysterio (2nd); Rhino (1st) (2nd); Sandman (1st) (2nd); Shocker (1st); Vulture (1st) (2nd)	Doctor Octopus
Ultimate Spider-Man This version holds the record for the most changed members. It mainly features new characters who were not depicted in the source material.	Beetle (1st); Crossbones (as Lizard) (4th); Doctor Octopus (1st) (2nd) (3rd) (4th); Electro (1st) (2nd) (3rd); Hydro-Man (3rd); Kraven (1st) (2nd) (3rd) (4th); Lizard (1st) (2nd); Rhino (1st) (2nd) (3rd) (4th); Scarlet Spider (3rd); Scorpion (2nd) (4th); Ultimate Green Goblin (3rd); Vulture (4th)	Doctor Octopus
Spider-Man (2017 TV series) This version is the least faithful to the source material. All members (except Doctor Octopus, the leader) are possessed.	Alistair Smythe; Doctor Octopus; Rhino; Spider-Man; Steel Spider; Vulture	Doctor Octopus

== Made-for-TV villains ==
These villains do not appear in the comics. They were created for various cartoon series. Among them are:

=== Spider-Man (1967) ===
- Baron von Rantenraven (voiced by Tom Harvey) - A German pilot who commanded Sky Harbor, which he used to invade New York with World War I biplanes. He uses paralyzing devices.
- Blackwell the Magician (voiced by Chris Wiggins) - Not a proper villain, but a powerful stage magician who tries to get Spider-Man's help to prevent the old Castle theater from being torn down, with former actors Emily Thorndike and James Booth. Later, the Green Goblin steals some of his magical equipment, but Blackwell helps Spider-Man defeat him.
- Blotto - A monster brought to life by Clive's "Spirit Scope" for getting revenge on the world. It starts consuming the city, but it is destroyed after being exposed to the Spirit Scope for a second time.
- Bolton (voiced by Len Carlson) - A giant Martian warrior who can throw thunderbolts and was sent to invade Earth. He was freed from Spider-Man's webbing by the Boomer, who then led Bolton to the "Gold Bullion Building", before he was accidentally sent away from Earth by one of his own thunderbolts. He is not to be confused with Thor.
- Boomer (voiced by Chris Wiggins) - A crook who used explosives to rob banks with his partner, the Borer due to lightning covering the sound. He commanded Bolton after freeing them, but after their defeat, Spider-Man knocked him out.
- Charles Cameo (voiced by Claude Ray in the first appearance, Carl Banas in the second appearance) - A former actor who used disguises to commit crimes. He once impersonated the Prime Minister of Rutania to steal charity money and later impersonated well-known figures and finally Spider-Man to steal art treasures, but both times he was exposed.
  - Brutus - Cameo's thuggish getaway driver.
- Carol - A spider-like alien who stole scientific equipment to help save her people.
- Clive (voiced by Tom Harvey) - A movie producer who planned revenge on the movie critics and audiences by creating the monster Blotto with his "Spirit Scope" while hiding in a power plant.
  - Collin - The dwarfish assistant of Clive. He is accidentally paralyzed by Clive's "Spirit Scope", but the Mayor later mentions he responded to treatment.
- Desperado (voiced by Bernard Cowan) - A cowboy-themed thief armed with hypnotic guns. He flew around on a robotic horse equipped with a helicopter-like rotor.
- De Vargas - A Spanish conquistador who ruled a golden Aztec city in the Andes (it is never explained what the Aztecs were doing in the Andes).
- Dr. Atlantean (voiced by Tom Harvey) - A scientist from Atlantis who brought Manhattan underwater as part of a plan to help the Atlanteans invade. He is a redrawn version of the Master Technician/Radiation Specialist.
- Dr. Cool - A diamond thief who put Spider-Man in a freezer that was somehow able to be set to absolute zero.
- Dr. Dumpty - Full name Dr. Humperdink Dumpty; a thief who stole the jewels of actor Rachel Welles when he attacked a parade. He utilized a small variety of balloon-themed weapons.
- Dr. Genie - An evil female genie disguised as a woman named "Melissa Genie".
- Dr. Magneto (voiced by Bernard Cowan) - Real name Dr. Matto Magneto (pronounced mag-net-o), he is a scientist armed with a gun that could magnetize and demagnetize metals and non-metals. He planned revenge upon the world for refusing to induct him into the Science Hall of Fame. Using anti-magnetic webbing, Spider-Man defeated Dr. Magneto.
- Dr. Manta (voiced by Carl Banas) - Actually a Rocket Robin Hood villain. He used giant, mechanical beetles and other monsters (all controlled by playing an organ) to enslave an island's inhabitants and planned to use them to mine a mineral that would give him great power.
- Dr. Noah Boddy (voiced by Henry Ramer) - A brilliant scientist who has somehow found a way to make himself invisible. In his first appearance, he took revenge on J. Jonah Jameson for ridiculing his theories of invisibility. In the second appearance, he broke Electro, the Green Goblin, and the Vulture out of jail to take out Spider-Man. Spider-Man makes them fight among themselves using ventriloquism, then webs up Boddy, who is then jailed.
- Dr. Vespasian - A criminal scientist who developed a drinkable invisibility serum that he tested on himself and his dog Brutus and who tried to get the cooperation of the city's major criminals by getting rid of Spider-Man, before being captured in ice cream by Spider-Man.
- Dr. Von Schlick (voiced by Bernard Cowan) - An evil scientist who wore a rubber, non-stick costume with petroleum-based bubbles emitted from his fingers. Spider-Man had to use a special webbing to stop him.
- Dr. Zap - An electricity-powered scientist who kidnapped Dr. Irving Caldwell to learn the secrets of his levitation helmet.
- Fakir (voiced by Paul Soles) - An Arabian fakir whose flute could move objects, cast illusions, and control alligators.
- Fiddler (voiced by Paul Kligman) - Otherwise only known as "Otto", Fiddler is a man whose violin was capable of concussive blasts and disintegrating objects. He was angry that rock music was overcoming classical music.
- Gator - An alligator that was given superhuman intelligence by Curt Conner. Its appearance was made from recycled footage of the Lizard's episode.
- Harley Clivendon (voiced by Chris Wiggins) - An Australian game hunter who once hypnotized J. Jonah Jameson with an idol so that he could steal their money with the help of an Aborigine. He later tried to find the Fountain of Youth.
- Human Fly Twins - Real names Stan Patterson (voiced by Len Carlson in the first appearance, Alfie Scopp in the second appearance) and Lee Patterson (voiced by Paul Kligman in the first appearance, Henry Ramer in the second appearance), they are former circus performers who robbed people with their ability to scale walls. They once impersonated Spider-Man. Not to be confused with the Human Fly found in the mainstream comics.
- Infinata (voiced by Chris Wiggins) - Actually a Rocket Robin Hood villain. Infinata is from Dementia Five in the Fifth Dimension. He attempted to steal the Library of Gorth from a dying scientist who came from the destroyed planet Gorth, but Spider-Man discovered that all of his power is based on fear.
- Master Technician/Radiation Specialist - A mad scientist who took over Manhattan's new and only nuclear power plant and uses a special ray in it to lift Manhattan into the clouds unless the city meets his demands, like amnesty from arrest and the right to make his own power plant. He had a radiation gun, which gave Spider-Man a disadvantage. In his next appearance, he is released from prison and uses radiation that takes over nearly all of the city's minds. In "Swing City," he is named the Master Technician. In "Specialists and Slaves," he is the Radiation Specialist. The episode "Up From Nowhere" features Dr. Atlantean, who is a slightly redrawn Master Technician.
- Master Vine (voiced by Tom Harvey) - The leader of a prehistoric race of plant people that lives off of radium energy. In a redone appearance, the people used a machine that cools the environment.
- Micro Man - Real name Professor Pretorius, a diabolical scientist who created a light bulb that could shrink him to a small size and planned to destroy New York with a nuclear weapon he called "The Kingdom Come Device" after breaking out of prison. The name "Micro Man" comes from the title of the episode, and is not used in the episode itself.
- Miss Trubble - A middle-aged woman with a chest that enabled her to summon living statue versions of Greek mythological gods, goddesses, and creatures.
- Mole (voiced by Tom Harvey) - Leader of the Molemen who led his kind into stealing buildings. His appearance used footage of Mugs Riley's Moleman disguise.
- Mugs Reilly (voiced by Tom Harvey) - A criminal who escaped from jail and discovered an underground society of Molemen. He used them to steal entire banks while disguised as their leader, but was unmasked by Spider-Man.
- Parafino (voiced by Len Carlson) - Owner of Parafino's Wax Museum, he can create living wax sculptures and trap people in suspended animation. He once used wax mannequins of Blackbeard, Jesse James (voiced by Jack Mather), and the Executioner of Paris (voiced by Max Ferguson) to commit crimes.
- Pardo (voiced by Gillie Fenwick) - A strange-looking man who could turn into an enormous black house cat composed of "pure energy" with hypnotic (and possibly teleporting) vision. When the black cat is electrocuted, all that is left are Pardo's clothes.
- Phantom (voiced by Max Ferguson in the first appearance, Alfie Scopp in the second appearance) - Some sort of inventor, he appeared in "The Fifth Avenue Phantom" and "The Dark Terrors". He used a device that shrank valuables as well as android women who masqueraded as department store mannequins. In his second appearance, he used a Shadow-Scope to create shadow monsters to commit crimes.
- Plotter (voiced by Gillie Fenwick) - The Plotter is a criminal mastermind who hires Ox and Cowboy to steal a blueprint for a missile and has a hideout of sophisticated technology.
- Plutonians - Not proper villains, but large ice beings from Pluto with freezing powers who attempt to kidnap Dr. Smartyr so that they can use his space warp-drive to leave Earth. After Spider-Man hears this story from the Plutonian Leader (voiced by Bernard Cowan), Spider-Man and Dr. Smartyr help them leave Earth at the end of the episode.
- Ponce de León - A centuries-old Spanish conquistador who found the Fountain of Youth and kidnapped Dr. Conner to prevent it from being discovered, although his cannon accidentally destroys it and he disappears. Never actually named, Dr. Conner and Spider-Man say the character just may have been Ponce de Leon around the end of the episode.
- Red Dog Melvin - A criminal who was assisted by Parafino.
- Robot - A huge metal-eating robot; it is unexplained where it came from. Spider-Man defeated it by causing it to fall into the water and short-circuit.
- Scarf - A thief who projected psychedelic images into the sky and stole things during the confusion.
- Scarlet Sorcerer (voiced by Carl Banas) - An ancient Egyptian sorcerer named Kotep who was defeated by his opponent Brazman and placed in suspended animation until a professor at Peter Parker's school used an incantation to awaken him 7,000 years later. He was followed by an army of demons who said they would only obey him if he defeated Spider-Man. Without his scepter, the Scarlet Sorcerer loses his power. When Spider-Man breaks it, he goes back into the depths of time.
- Shakespeare - A gentleman thief whose gang dressed up in gorilla suits after some were let loose at a zoo to steal diamonds.
- Sir Galahad - A thief dressed in a full suit of armor who rode a motorcycle and armed himself with an electrified lance.
- Skymaster - A criminal who hated all "ground-dwellers", riding in his blimp.
- Snowman - A snowman brought to life by a chemical reaction and electrical charge. Spider-Man defeated the Snowman by electrocuting him. He is only briefly named the "Snow Master" by J. Jonah Jameson in the closing moments of the episode.
- Super Swami - A swami called Coga with a talent for creating illusions. He was eventually knocked into a river by Spider-Man and jailed.

=== Spider-Man (1981 TV series) ===
- Gadgeteer (voiced by Richard Ramos) - Joshua is an evil and jealous janitor who seeks to gain attention, takes on this identity to steal Dr. Norton's shrink ray.
- Nephilia (voiced by Arlin Miller) - A scientist named Dr. Bradley Shaw and his assistant Penny plotted to attain Spider-Man's blood and a DNA sample of a Nephilia spider to duplicate his powers. However, Shaw is transformed into a mutant spider hybrid before Spider-Man cures him.
- Professor Gizmo (voiced by Ron Feinberg) - Professor Gizmo is a master criminal who planned to use Spider-Man to attach an antenna to the large sunken treasure ship, the El Conquistador.
- Sidewinder (voiced by Philip L. Clarke) - Sidewinder is a masked cowboy villain who rides a flying robot horse. He leads a gang of cowboys who also ride flying robot horses. Spider-Man managed to defeat Sidewinder and discover that he is Wild Willie Wilson, who had pulled the robberies that framed the original owner of the Rodeo Show.
- Stuntman (voiced by Peter Cullen) - Jack Riven was the World's Greatest Stuntman until an accident permanently fused him to a mechanical suit of armor a few years ago. He blames Spider-Man for that. Stuntman has two lackeys named Larry and Moe (voiced by Gene Ross and Jack Angel) who help make up the Triangle of Evil.

=== Spider-Man and His Amazing Friends (1981) ===
- Arachnoid (voiced by Dan Gilvezan) - Zoltan is a chemical scientist who creates a Spider Serum that will give him Spider Powers. He impersonates and frames Spider-Man when committing crimes until he mutates into the Arachnoid: a mutant with the torso of a man and a spider's body from the waist down. His assistant, Monica, gives the Spider Friends the antidote to return Zoltan to normal.
- Buzz Mason - A S.H.I.E.L.D. agent who secretly mind-controlled Lightwave into committing robberies of a device that will enable him to control a satellite called the GUARDSTAR.
- Cyberiad (voiced by Dennis Marks) - Nathan Price was Firestar's boyfriend until an accident caused by an attack by A.I.M. caused him to end up as a cyborg called Cyberiad. He attacked the X-Men Mansion and captured its members one by one. His design is based on Fatal Five member Tharok.
- Gamesman - The Gamesman plotted to cause havoc in New York by using the arcade games to hypnotize the teenagers there. He unwittingly caused Francis Byte to become Videoman, resulting in Gamesman manipulating him.
- Lightwave (voiced by Marlene Aragon) - Aurora Dante is Iceman's half-sister who can manipulate and control light. She is an agent of S.H.I.E.L.D. until Buzz Mason mind-controlled her into stealing a device that will allow Buzz to control the GUARDSTAR. Lightwave is based on Aurora and Darkstar.
- Videoman - Electro brought it out of an arcade game to steal components for his Ultra-Transformer, but was defeated by the Spider-Friends. Videoman was released again during a thunderstorm. A teenage video game prodigy named Francis Byte (voiced by Frank Welker) ends up becoming Videoman due to an explosion caused by the Gamesman's plot. After the Gamesman's defeat, Videoman begins training with the X-Men.

=== Spider-Man (1994 TV series) ===
- Alisha Silvermane (voiced by Leigh-Allyn Baker) - In this series, she is Silvermane's daughter.
- Iceberg (voiced by Lawrence Mandley) - He was a frozen crime lord that works for the Kingpin and whom Hobbie Brown used to work for before becoming the Prowler.
- Lizard Warriors - A group of normal lizards in the sewer who were mutated by Curt Connors' DNA that was leaked into the sewers. They began to revere Curt Connors as their father and wanted his Lizard side to lead them. With help from Debra Whitman and Martha Connors, Spider-Man and Mary Jane Watson helped to cure the Lizard with a special bomb that regressed the Lizard Warriors to their normal forms.
  - Monitor (voiced by Rodney Saulsberry) - Member of the Lizard Warriors.
  - Gecko (voiced by Roger Kern) - Member of the Lizard Warriors.
  - Gila (voiced by Kathy Garver) - Member of the Lizard Warriors. She later helped Spider-Man, Mary Jane Watson, Debra Whitman, and Martha Connors in curing the Lizard and returning all Lizard Warriors, including herself, back to normal.
- Miriam (voiced by Nichelle Nichols) - In this series, she is a vampire queen and the mother of Blade.

=== Spider-Man: The New Animated Series (2003) ===
- Dr. Zellner (voiced by Jeffrey Combs) - He developed a drug that would make stupid people intelligent. He tested it on thug twins Jack and Mack and used them to commit crimes.
- The Gaines Twins (voiced by Jeremy Piven and Kathy Griffin) - Roland and Roxanne Gaines are ruthless telepathic twins. They held a vendetta against Kraven the Hunter for killing their parents with a poison (that, ironically, also gave the Twins their powers) and almost manipulated Spider-Man into killing him.
- Piranha - An assassin who, disguised as a European Union member named Harlan Tremain, targeted the Mayor of New York and the President. Silver Sable attacked him, although Spider-Man thought she was the enemy at first.
- Pterodax - Pterodax is a high-tech mercenary group.
  - Sergei (voiced by James Marsters) - Leader of Pterodax.
  - Aleksei (voiced by Brendan Connolly) - Member of Pterodax.
  - Boris (voiced by Ken Lerner) - Member of Pterodax.
- Shikata (voiced by Gina Gershon) - Shikata is a martial arts expert and swordsman who uses a mystical sword and incantation to stay young. Seeing Spider-Man as a worthy foe, she wanted to fight him to the death. At first, Spider-Man refused, but after Shikata threatened Mary Jane, he ended up dueling her. Spider-Man destroyed the sword, ending Shikata's prolonged life.
- Talon (voiced by Eve) - Cheyenne Tate is a high-tech thief who was a love interest for Harry Osborn. She is somewhat based on Black Cat.
- Turbo Jet (voiced by Harold Perrineau) - As Turbo Jet, Wyler acts like a modern-day Robin Hood, stealing from the rich and giving to the poor while wearing a high-tech suit. He is said to be based on Rocket Racer.

=== Ultimate Spider-Man (2012) ===
- Boston Terroriers - A group of lesser Boston criminals stopped by Spider-Man, who were given high-tech armor by Steel Spider.
  - Plymouth Rocker (voiced by Maurice LaMarche) - A common Boston criminal whose armor enhances his combat skills and gives him superhuman strength and the ability to climb up walls. He is named for Plymouth Rock.
  - Salem's Witch (voiced by Misty Lee) - A Boston museum thief who wields anti-gravity disks and laser-shooting bracelets. She is named for the Salem witch trials.
  - Slam Adams (voiced by Jeff Bennett) - A Boston robber given high-tech patriot armor by Steel Spider. Slam Adams also wields a shield. He is named for Samuel Adams.
- Wolf Spider (voiced by Christopher Daniel Barnes) - A villainous alternate universe counterpart of Spider-Man.

=== Spider-Noir ===
- James "Jimmy" Addison (played by Jack Mikesell) - A criminal with pyrokinesis abilities.

== Video games ==
Several Spider-Man villains have made appearances in Spider-Man video games series or other Marvel Comics related shows, mostly in other games. Here is a listing in alphabetical order.

Villain	Video games	Actor
Agony; Leslie Gesneria	Spider-Man Unlimited	
Anti-Venom; Eddie Brock	Spider-Man: Edge of Time Spider-Man Unlimited	Steve Blum
Arcade	Spider-Man: Edge of Time	Jim Cummings
Beetle; Abner Jenkins	Spider-Man: The Animated Series Spider-Man: Lethal Foes Spider-Man 2: Enter Electro Ultimate Spider-Man Lego Marvel Super Heroes	Daran Norris Tucker Smallwood Steven Blum
Big Wheel; Jackson Weele	Spider-Man: Web of Shadows Spider-Man: Edge of Time	Steve Blum
Black Cat; Felicia Hardy	Spider-Man (2000) Spider-Man 2 Spider-Man: Friend or Foe Spider-Man: Web of Shadows Spider-Man: Edge of Time The Amazing Spider-Man; The Amazing Spider-Man 2 Spider-Man Unlimited Marvel's Spider-Man; Marvel's Spider-Man 2	Jennifer Hale Holly Fields Audrey Wasilewski Tricia Helfer Katee Sackhoff Ali Hillis; Tara Strong Erica Lindbeck
Black Tarantula; Carlos LaMuerto	Spider-Man Unlimited	
Boomerang; Fred Myers	Ultimate Spider-Man Spider-Man: Shattered Dimensions	Jim Cummings
Calypso; Calypso Ezili	Spider-Man 2 Spider-Man 3 Spider-Man: Shattered Dimensions	Angela V. Shelton Jennifer Hale
Carnage; Cletus Kasady	Spider-Man (2000) Ultimate Spider-Man Spider-Man: Friend or Foe; Spider-Man: Shattered Dimensions The Amazing Spider-Man 2 Spider-Man Unlimited	Dee Bradley Baker William Hope Fred Tatasciore David Agranov
Carrion; Miles Warren's Clone	Spider-Man and Venom: Maximum Carnage	
Chameleon; Dmitri Smerdyakov	The Amazing Spider-Man 2 Marvel's Spider-Man 2	Glenn Steinbaum Jim Pirri
Demogoblin; Demon	Spider-Man and Venom: Maximum Carnage Lego Marvel Super Heroes Spider-Man Unlimited	
Doctor Octopus; Otto Octavius	Spider-Man (2000) Spider-Man 2 Spider-Man: Friend or Foe Spider-Man: Edge of Time Spider-Man Unlimited Marvel's Spider-Man; Marvel's Spider-Man: Miles Morales; Marvel's Spider-Man 2	Efrem Zimbalist Jr. Alfred Molina Joe Alaskey Dave B. Mitchell William Salyers
Doppelganger; Peter Parker's Clone	Spider-Man and Venom: Maximum Carnage Spider-Man Unlimited	
Electro; Max Dillon	Spider-Man 2: Enter Electro Ultimate Spider-Man Spider-Man 3 Spider-Man: Friend or Foe Spider-Man: Web of Shadows Spider-Man: Shattered Dimensions The Amazing Spider-Man 2 Spider-Man Unlimited Marvel's Spider-Man	Dee Bradley Baker James Arnold Taylor David Kaye Liam O'Brien Thomas F. Wilson Michael Shepperd; Liam O'Brien Josh Keaton
Green Goblin; Harry Osborn	Spider-Man (2002); Spider-Man 2 Spider-Man 3 Spider-Man: Friend or Foe The Amazing Spider-Man 2 Marvel's Spider-Man Marvel's Spider-Man 2	Josh Keaton James Franco Josh Keaton Kevin Dorman; Nolan North Scott Porter Graham Phillips
Green Goblin; Norman Osborn	Spider-Man (2002) Ultimate Spider-Man Spider-Man: Friend or Foe; Spider-Man: Web of Shadows Spider-Man: Shattered Dimensions Spider-Man Unlimited Marvel's Spider-Man; Marvel's Spider-Man: Miles Morales; Marvel's Spider-Man 2	Willem Dafoe Peter Lurie Roger L. Jackson Jim Cummings Mark Rolston
Grizzly; Max Markham	X-Men Legends II: Rise of Apocalypse	Keith Ferguson
Hammerhead; Joseph Martello	Spider-Man 2: Enter Electro Spider-Man: Shattered Dimensions The Amazing Spider-Man 2 Spider-Man Unlimited Marvel's Spider-Man	Dee Bradley Baker John DiMaggio David Boat Keith Silverstein
Hobgoblin; Roderick Kingsley	Spider-Man: Web of Shadows Spider-Man: Shattered Dimensions	Steve Blum
Hydro-Man; Morrie Bench	Spider-Man Unlimited	
Iguana	The Amazing Spider-Man Spider-Man Unlimited	
Jack O'Lantern; Jason Macendale	Spider-Man: The Animated Series Marvel: Ultimate Alliance 2 Marvel: Avengers Alliance Spider-Man Unlimited	
Jackal; Miles Warren	Spider-Man: Web of Shadows	Greg Baldwin
Kingpin; Wilson Fisk	Spider-Man 3 Spider-Man: Web of Shadows The Amazing Spider-Man 2 Marvel's Spider-Man; Marvel's Spider-Man: Miles Morales	Bob Joles Gregg Berger JB Blanc Travis Willingham
Kraven the Hunter; Sergei Kravinoff	Spider-Man (2002) Spider-Man 3 Spider-Man: Web of Shadows Spider-Man: Shattered Dimensions The Amazing Spider-Man 2 Spider-Man Unlimited Marvel's Spider-Man 2	Gary Anthony Sturgis Neil Kaplan Dwight Schultz Jim Cummings Steve Blum; Nolan North Jim Pirri
Lasher; Ramón Hernández	Spider-Man Unlimited	
Lizard; Curt Connors	Spider-Man (2000); Spider-Man 2: Enter Electro Spider-Man 2 Spider-Man 3 Spider-Man: Friend or Foe The Amazing Spider-Man Marvel's Spider-Man: Miles Morales; Marvel's Spider-Man 2	Dee Bradley Baker Joe Alaskey Nathan Carlson Roger L. Jackson Steve Blum Mark Whitten
Mad Bomber; Luke Carlyle	Spider-Man 3	Neil Ross
Man-Wolf; John Jameson	Spider-Man 2	Charles Klausmeyer
Menace; Lily Hollister	Spider-Man: Edge of Time	Tara Strong
Mister Negative; Martin Li	Marvel's Spider-Man; Marvel's Spider-Man 2	Stephen Oyoung
Morbius the Living Vampire; Michael Morbius	Spider-Man 3 Spider-Man Unlimited	Sean Donnellan
Morlun	Spider-Man Unlimited	
Mysterio; Quentin Beck	Spider-Man (2000) Spider-Man 2 Spider-Man: Friend or Foe Spider-Man: Web of Shadows Spider-Man: Shattered Dimensions Spider-Man Unlimited Marvel's Spider-Man 2	Daran Norris Dee Bradley Baker; James Arnold Taylor Robin Atkin Downes Greg Baldwin David Kaye Noshir Dalal
Nattie, the Piranha	The Amazing Spider-Man	
Overdrive; James Beverley	Spider-Man: Edge of Time	Kari Wahlgren
Phage; Carl Mach	Spider-Man Unlimited	
Prowler; Aaron Davis	Spider-Man Unlimited Marvel's Spider-Man: Miles Morales; Marvel's Spider-Man 2	Ike Amadi
Prowler; Hobie Brown	Spider-Man: Friend or Foe Spider-Man Unlimited	Chris Gardner
Puma; Thomas Fireheart	Spider-Man 2	Dee Bradley Baker
Rhino; Aleksei Sytsevich	Spider-Man (2000) Spider-Man 2 Ultimate Spider-Man Spider-Man 3 Spider-Man: Friend or Foe Spider-Man: Web of Shadows; Spider-Man: Edge of Time; The Amazing Spider-Man; The Amazing Spider-Man 2 Spider-Man Unlimited Marvel's Spider-Man; Marvel's Spider-Man: Miles Morales	Dee Bradley Baker John DiMaggio Bob Glouberman Steve Blum John DiMaggio Fred Tatasciore Fred Tatasciore
Riot; Trevor Cole	Spider-Man Unlimited	
Robot-Master; Mendel Stromm	Spider-Man (2002)	Peter Lurie
Sandman; William Baker	Spider-Man 2: Enter Electro Spider-Man 3 Spider-Man: Friend or Foe Spider-Man: Web of Shadows Spider-Man: Shattered Dimensions Spider-Man Unlimited Marvel's Spider-Man 2	Daran Norris Thomas Haden Church Fred Tatasciore Dimitri Diatchenko Leandro Cano
Scorpion; Mac Gargan	Spider-Man (2000) Spider-Man (2002) Spider-Man 3 Spider-Man: Friend or Foe Spider-Man: Shattered Dimensions The Amazing Spider-Man Spider-Man Unlimited Marvel's Spider-Man; Marvel's Spider-Man 2	Daran Norris Mike McColl Dee Bradley Baker Fred Tatasciore John Kassir Jason Spisak
Scream; Donna Diego	Spider-Man Unlimited	
Screwball; Liz Allan	Marvel's Spider-Man	Stephanie Lemelin
She-Venom; Anne Weying	Spider-Man Unlimited	
Shocker; Herman Schultz	Spider-Man 2: Enter Electro Spider-Man (2002); Spider-Man 2 Ultimate Spider-Man Spider-Man: Web of Shadows Spider-Man: Edge of Time The Amazing Spider-Man 2 Marvel's Spider-Man	Daran Norris Michael Beattie Brian George Liam O'Brien Steve Blum Ryan Alosio Dave B. Mitchell
Shriek; Frances Barrison	Spider-Man and Venom: Maximum Carnage Spider-Man: Mysterio's Menace Spider-Man 3	Courtenay Taylor
Silvermane; Silvio Manfredi	Spider-Man: Shattered Dimensions	Steve Blum
Silver Sable; Silver Sablinova	Ultimate Spider-Man; Spider-Man: Friend or Foe; Spider-Man: Shattered Dimensions Spider-Man Unlimited Marvel's Spider-Man	Jennifer Hale Nichole Elise
Spencer Smythe	Spider-Man: Web of Shadows	
Spider-Carnage; Ben Reilly	The Amazing Spider-Man 2 Spider-Man Unlimited	Sam Riegel
Stilt-Man; Wilbur Day	Spider-Man: Web of Shadows	
Tarantula; Anton Miguel Rodriguez	Spider-Man Unlimited	
Taskmaster; Tony Masters	Marvel's Spider-Man	Brian Bloom
Tinkerer; Phineas Mason	Spider-Man: The Animated Series Spider-Man: Web of Shadows Marvel: Ultimate Alliance 2 Spider-Man: Shattered Dimensions Spider-Man: Miles Morales	William Utay Philip Proctor Jim Cummings Jasmin Savoy Brown
Tombstone; Lonnie Lincoln	Marvel's Spider-Man; Marvel's Spider-Man 2	Corey Jones
Toxin; Patrick Mulligan	Spider-Man Unlimited	
Ultimate Spider-Slayer; Alistair Smythe	The Amazing Spider-Man: Lethal Foes Spider-Man: The Animated Series The Amazing Spider-Man Spider-Man Unlimited	Nolan North
Venom; Angelo Fortunato	Spider-Man Unlimited	
Venom; Eddie Brock	Spider-Man (2000) Ultimate Spider-Man Spider-Man 3 Spider-Man: Friend or Foe Spider-Man: Web of Shadows The Amazing Spider-Man 2 Spider-Man Unlimited	Daran Norris Arthur Burghardt Topher Grace Quinton Flynn Keith Szarabajka Ben Diskin
Venom	Marvel's Spider-Man 2	Tony Todd
Vermin; Edward Whelan	The Amazing Spider-Man	Steve Blum
Vulture; Adrian Toomes	Spider-Man (2002); Spider-Man 2 Ultimate Spider-Man Spider-Man: Web of Shadows Spider-Man: Shattered Dimensions Spider-Man Unlimited Marvel's Spider-Man	Dwight Schultz Brian George Kristoffer Tabori Steve Blum Dwight Schultz
Wraith; Yuri Watanabe	Spider-Man Unlimited Marvel's Spider-Man; Marvel's Spider-Man 2	Tara Platt

== Novels, theatre and radio ==
Spider-Man villains that were introduced in novels, theatre productions, and radio programs.

=== The Gentleman ===
For decades, the wealthy and misanthropic Gustav Fiers controlled a criminal organisation. Fiers had a lethal reputation in the criminal underworld, known for conducting elaborate plans to increase his own wealth, involved behind the scenes in various significant events in global history. Gustav Fiers eventually learned that Richard and Mary Parker, two agents under his employ, were double agents working for the United States government. When the Parkers were hired by Albert Malik, Fiers informed Malik of their disloyalty. Malik hired Gustav Fiers' brother, the Finisher, to kill the Parkers. The Finisher succeeded in doing so but, decades later, was killed in a battle with the Parkers' son, Spider-Man.

=== Lesser threats ===
Villain	Media	Creator
Disk Jockey	Spider-Man: Secret of the Sinister Six (2002 novel)	Adam Troy Castro
Pity	Spider-Man: The Gathering of the Sinister Six (1999 novel); Spider-Man: Revenge of the Sinister Six (2001 novel); Spider-Man: Secret of the Sinister Six (2002 novel)	Adam Troy Castro
Swiss Miss	Spider-Man: Turn Off the Dark (2011 musical)	Julie Taymor
