= Spider-Man: Shattered Dimensions =

2010 video game

- Cover art featuring (from left to right): the 2099, Amazing, Noir, and Ultimate versions of Spider-Man
- Developer: Beenox (Note: Nintendo DS version developed by Griptonite Games)
- Publisher: Activision
- Directors: Kody Sabourin; Pablo Gonzalez
- Producer: Meghan Morgan
- Writers: Mark Hoffmeier; Daniel Strange; Dan Slott
- Composer: Jim Dooley
- Series: Spider-Man
- Platforms: Nintendo DS; PlayStation 3; Wii; Xbox 360; Windows
- Release: Nintendo DS, PlayStation 3, Wii, & Xbox 360: NA: September 7, 2010; EU: September 10, 2010; AU: September 29, 2010; Windows: NA: November 24, 2010; EU: November 26, 2010
- Genres: Action-adventure; Metroidvania (DS)
- Mode: Single-player

Spider-Man: Shattered Dimensions is a 2010 action-adventure video game based on the Marvel Comics superhero Spider-Man, developed by Beenox and published by Activision. Players control four different versions of Spider-Man, each originating from a different universe in the Marvel Comics multiverse. Previous Spider-Man voice actors Neil Patrick Harris, Christopher Daniel Barnes, Dan Gilvezan, and Josh Keaton each voice one of the four Spider-Men. The Nintendo DS version of the game was developed by Griptonite Games and features only three Spider-Man variants.

The game revolves around an artifact known as the Tablet of Order and Chaos. When it is shattered into pieces during a fight between the Amazing Spider-Man and Mysterio, it causes problems with multiple realities across the Marvel Multiverse. Madame Web recruits the Amazing Spider-Man and three alternate versions of the hero—Spider-Man Noir, Spider-Man 2099, and Ultimate Spider-Man—to restore balance by retrieving the tablet fragments from villains within their respective dimensions. Gameplay alternates between the four Spider-Men, who control similarly but present a different gameplay style and/or abilities. For example, the Spider-Man Noir levels encourage a stealth approach, while the Ultimate Spider-Man levels place emphasis on large scale combat encounters.

Shattered Dimensions is the first Spider-Man game developed by Beenox after being given the license by Activision, replacing previous developer Treyarch. It received generally positive reviews from critics, who praised the concept of bringing four Marvel universes together, and lauded the voice acting, combat, presentation, humor, and score. However, criticism was aimed at the game's simplistic story, choice of villains, and the overall design of the cutscenes as well as its technical difficulties.

A sequel, Spider-Man: Edge of Time, was released in October 2011, featuring only the Amazing Spider-Man and Spider-Man 2099. Both the game and its sequel were de-listed from the PlayStation Network and Xbox Live marketplaces in 2014 following the expiration of Activision's existing licensing deal with Marvel. Shattered Dimensions was re-released via Steam on October 24, 2015, but was later removed on April 1, 2017.

One of the writers of the game, Mark Hoffmeier, also worked on the well-received Spider-Man: The Animated Series on Fox Kids before working on the game. Some of the concepts from the TV show influenced the game, including the use of multiple versions of Spider-Man (as seen on the show) and the concept of the Tablet of Order and Chaos. Another writer for Shattered Dimensions, Dan Slott, later worked on the 2014 comic book storyline, "Spider-Verse", which was influenced by the game and, in turn, inspired the animated Spider-Verse film franchise.

== Gameplay ==
Spider-Man: Shattered Dimensions is a level-based third-person action-adventure video game, where the player assumes the role of four different versions of Spider-Man, spanning across the Amazing, Noir, 2099, and Ultimate universes. Gameplay revolves around each Spider-Man's unique superhuman abilities; players are able to web swing, web zip, crawl walls, and use the 'spider-sense' to identify enemies or objects of interest. The combat of the game offers a large variety of fighting moves, and each Spider-Man has his own fighting style. The points necessary for buying upgrades and new fighting moves are earned from defeating enemies or completing various challenges in the "Web of Destiny." The points earned can also be used to purchase 16 alternate costumes (four for each Spider-Man), which do not provide any gameplay advantages and are purely cosmetic.

The game features numerous supervillains from classic Spider-Man comics as bosses; some of the villains are created exclusively for the game, such as the 2099 versions of Hobgoblin and Doctor Octopus, and the Noir version of Hammerhead. All bosses are usually fought twice in a level, and during the second battle, they possess a new series of powers, granted to them by the Tablet of Order and Chaos, requiring players to change their strategy. During specific parts of the boss battles, Shattered Dimensions switches to a first-person perspective, where the player can use the analog sticks (or the Wii Remote and Nunchuk in the Wii version) to control Spider-Man's arms, punching their opponent and dodging their attacks. Three different types of punches are available.

While all four Spider-Men control identically, they each feature a different gameplay style. For example, the Spider-Man Noir levels require players to hide in the shadows and take down enemies stealthily, while Spider-Man 2099 features unique free falling segments. Some of the Spider-Men also feature unique abilities, such as Spider-Man 2099 being able to slow down time to dodge incoming attacks, and Ultimate Spider-Man being able to use his symbiote tendrils to take on large groups of enemies at once.

=== Nintendo DS version ===
The Nintendo DS version of Shattered Dimensions is a side-scrolling brawler with little gameplay difference between the multiple iterations of Spider-Man. This version also omits Ultimate Spider-Man, and features fewer villains: Electro and the Tinkerer for the Amazing Spider-Man; Boomerang and Calypso for Spider-Man Noir; and Vulture and Silvermane for Spider-Man 2099. Not all the moves are available at the beginning, and can be unlocked as players progress through the game. While most of the action is played with pad and button controls, the touchscreen is used to play a mini-game in between levels to help Spider-Man use the Tablet to travel between dimensions.

== Plot ==
On Earth-10955, the Amazing Spider-Man accidentally shatters an artifact called the Tablet of Order and Chaos while trying to prevent Mysterio from stealing it. While Mysterio escapes with one Tablet fragment, the Amazing Spider-Man is approached by Madame Web, who reveals that the others have been scattered across this and three other realities across the multiverse. To restore balance, Madame Web recruits him, Spider-Man Noir, Spider-Man 2099, and the symbiote-empowered Ultimate Spider-Man to retrieve the fragments from their native dimensions. After the four Spider-Men each collect their first fragments with no difficulty, Madame Web warns them that the fragments can grant incredible powers and must not be allowed to fall into the wrong hands. Meanwhile, Mysterio discovers his fragment granted him magic powers and seeks out the rest.

Each universe represented in Spider-Man: Shattered Dimensions features different villains and a unique art style. Here, the Amazing Spider-Man is shown fighting Juggernaut.

While searching for their second fragments, the Spider-Men discover that they have already been found by supervillains. The Amazing Spider-Man is captured by Kraven the Hunter and taken to a jungle, where he is forced to overcome a series of trials for a fragment. However, Kraven reneges on their deal and uses it to gain superspeed. Spider-Man Noir pursues Hammerhead, who is driven mad with power after using the fragment he had found to fuse his arms with his guns and plots to overthrow his boss, Norman Osborn. Spider-Man 2099 is attacked by the Hobgoblin, a cyborg mercenary who uses his fragment to increase his psy-powers and create illusions to torment the superhero. The Ultimate Spider-Man battles Electro to prevent him from destroying a hydro-electric Dam, where the latter uses his fragment to grow larger and more powerful as he absorbs more energy. Eventually, the Spider-Men are able to defeat the villains and claim their fragments before heading off to find more.

The Amazing Spider-Man finds another fragment at an abandoned Roxxon Industries quarry, but it is stolen by Flint Marko / Sandman, who uses it to increase his powers and take over the quarry. Spider-Man Noir pursues the Vulture, Norman's right-hand man and his uncle Ben Parker's killer for the fragment, which granted the villain teleportation powers. Spider-Man 2099 faces his half-brother Kron Stone / Scorpion, who has stolen the fragment for a contractor in exchange for reversing his mutation, gaining the ability to create numerous offspring in the process. The Ultimate Spider-Man competes in Deadpool's reality TV show Pain Factor for the fragment, which the latter eventually uses to clone himself. When the Spider-Men return to Madame Web with the fragments they collected, Mysterio attacks and threats to kill Madame Web if they do not deliver the remaining fragments to him.

The Amazing Spider-Man finds his final fragment at a construction yard, but is forced to intervene in Silver Sable and the Wild Pack's chase of the Juggernaut after the latter unknowingly picks it up. Spider-Man Noir faces Norman for his final fragment, which the latter used to mutate himself into a goblin-like creature and take over a carnival. Spider-Man 2099 breaks into Alchemax, where he finds his final fragment in the hands of Dr. Serena Patel / Doctor Octopus, Hobgoblin's creator and Scorpion's contractor. The Ultimate Spider-Man finds his final fragment at the Triskelion, where S.H.I.E.L.D. unwittingly combined it with Carnage, giving the creature the ability to resurrect its victims into zombie-like minions and allowing it to break free and take over the base.

After retrieving the final set of fragments, the four Spider-Men return to Mysterio, who absorbs the complete Tablet after a brief struggle and becomes a god. He shatters the borders between realities, seeking to create a new one under his rule. However, this allows Madame Web to summon the four Spider-Men to fight Mysterio together. After defeating Mysterio and separating him from the Tablet, the multiverse is restored and the multiversal Spider-Men return to their native realities while the Amazing Spider-Man takes Mysterio to prison.

In a post-credits scene, Madame Web is visited by Spider-Ham, who had also hoped to help save the multiverse, but arrived too late.

== Cast ==
Each of the different Spider-Men is portrayed by an actor who voiced Spider-Man in a prior animated series:

- Neil Patrick Harris as Peter Parker / Amazing Spider-Man

The primary, present day traditional version of Spider-Man. After a battle with Mysterio in his home universe, the Tablet of Order and Chaos is fragmented, with the pieces scattered across this and three other dimensions. Over the course of his journey to recover the tablet fragments located in his universe, this version of Spider-Man has to contend with the likes of Kraven the Hunter, the Sandman, and Juggernaut before teaming up with his counterparts to take on Mysterio during the final battle. Harris previously played Spider-Man in 2003's short-lived Spider-Man: The New Animated Series that spun out of the 2002 film.

- Christopher Daniel Barnes as Peter Parker / Spider-Man Noir

An alternate version of Peter Parker from a dimension referred to as the "Noir Universe", set in the 1930s. This version of Spider-Man has a darker personality and a more brutal fighting style, with a greater emphasis on stealth. At this time, Spider-Man Noir did not use web-lines in his comic book stories, but Madame Web increases his web control so he can use web-lines in this game. Over the course of his involvement in the story, he is forced to face off against Noir versions of Hammerhead, Vulture, and Norman "The Goblin" Osborn before joining the other Spider-Men to battle Mysterio. Barnes previously acted as Spider-Man in 1994's animated Spider-Man TV series. He would go on to play Spider-Man 2099 in the Shattered Dimensions sequel Spider-Man: Edge of Time.

- Dan Gilvezan as Miguel O'Hara / Spider-Man 2099

A different character who took up the Spider-Man mantle in the future, Miguel O'Hara is forced to contend with the machinations of the evil Alchemax corporation in addition to facing off against future versions of Spider-Man enemies: Hobgoblin, Scorpion, and Doctor Octopus. Though he does not normally have a spider-sense like Peter Parker, Madame Web temporarily gives him a form of it so he can track down the tablet fragments. Gilvezan previously voiced Peter Parker in the 1981 animated series Spider-Man and His Amazing Friends.

- Josh Keaton as Peter Parker / Ultimate Spider-Man

A younger, only slightly altered variation of Peter Parker from a dimension known as the "Ultimate Universe", this version of Spider-Man is fitted with his universe's version of the black symbiote suit that enhances his aggression and pre-existing super strength. Madame Web uses her psychic abilities to keep the suit from overwhelming and corrupting young Peter. In his universe, Ultimate Spider-Man is forced to face off against Electro, Deadpool, and Carnage before joining the final battle against Mysterio. Keaton previously portrayed Spider-Man in the 2008 animated series The Spectacular Spider-Man, as well as other video games like Marvel Super Hero Squad and Marvel vs. Capcom 3: Fate of Two Worlds/Ultimate Marvel vs. Capcom 3. He also went on to play the character's traditional version in the Shattered Dimensions sequel Edge of Time. Prior to playing Spider-Man himself, Keaton also voiced Peter's best friend Harry Osborn in various video games (Spider-Man, Spider-Man 2, and Spider-Man: Friend or Foe), and would later play Electro in Insomniac's Spider-Man, as well as Norman Osborn, John Jameson and Steel Spider in Marvel's Spider-Man.

Several actors return to reprise roles from elsewhere in Spider-Man and Marvel Comics media:

- John DiMaggio (who has also voiced The Rhino multiple times) reprises his role as Hammerhead from The Spectacular Spider-Man.
- Steve Blum (several characters in The Spectacular Spider-Man as well as Wolverine in various media outlets) voices Hobgoblin 2099, Silvermane 2099, Noir Vulture, and Vulture 2099.
- Jim Cummings (Shocker in Spider-Man: The Animated Series) voices Kraven the Hunter, Noir Goblin, Noir Boomerang, and Tinkerer.
- Thomas F. Wilson (Sergeant Stan Carter on The Spectacular Spider-Man) voices Electro and Ultimate Electro.
- Nolan North reprises his role as Deadpool from Hulk Vs.
- Fred Tatasciore reprises his role as Carnage from Spider-Man: Friend or Foe and Marvel: Ultimate Alliance 2.
- Jennifer Hale reprises her role as Silver Sable from the Ultimate Spider-Man video game and Spider-Man: Friend or Foe while also voicing Noir Calypso.
- John Kassir (Deadpool in X-Men Legends II: Rise of Apocalypse, Marvel: Ultimate Alliance and Marvel: Ultimate Alliance 2) voices Scorpion 2099 and a couple of Deadpool's fanboys.
- Tara Strong (Christina in Spider-Man: The New Animated Series) voices Doctor Octopus 2099.

Other returning actors who voice various characters throughout the game:

- Gregg Berger (Kraven the Hunter and Mysterio in Spider-Man: The Animated Series, Kingpin in Spider-Man: Web of Shadows)
- Rodger Bumpass (Doctor Octopus in The Amazing Adventures of Spider-Man)
- Chris Edgerly (Spider-Man in The Amazing Adventures of Spider-Man)
- Nick Jameson (Morbius, the Living Vampire and Richard Fisk in Spider-Man: The Animated Series)
- Keith Szarabajka (Wolverine in Ultimate Spider-Man, Venom in Spider-Man: Web of Shadows, and a Kingpin henchman in Spider-Man: The New Animated Series)
- James Arnold Taylor (Spider-Man in Spider-Man: Friend or Foe and Spider-Man: Battle for New York, Mysterio in Spider-Man 2, Electro in Ultimate Spider-Man, and Harry Osborn and Frederick Foswell in The Spectacular Spider-Man)
- Dave Wittenberg (additional voices in Ultimate Spider-Man)

Other cast members include David Kaye as Mysterio, Susanne Blakeslee as Madame Web, Dimitri Diatchenko as Sandman, and Matt Willig as Juggernaut. Peter Porker / Spider-Ham, an alternate talking animal version of Spider-Man, also makes a brief appearance at the end of the game, voiced by Kevin Umbricht, who was uncredited for the role; this marks the first time Spider-Ham was seen outside of comics. Spider-Man co-creator Stan Lee narrates the game's story.

Jamie Thomson served as voice director, having previously directed The Spectacular Spider-Man. Jim Dooley composed the game's orchestral score.

== Development and marketing ==
Beenox developed several alternate costumes for the game, including Manga Spider-Man (above). This marks the first appearance of the Manga costume in a video game.

Spider-Man: Shattered Dimensions was unveiled on March 30, 2010, where two of the universes, Amazing and Noir, were revealed. The third universe, 2099, was revealed on June 8. The final universe, Ultimate, was first shown to players at San Diego Comic-Con in 2010. Developer Beenox sought to make each universe feel unique by creating an individual art style for each universe and giving each Spider-Man different gameplay mechanics. For example, the Amazing and Ultimate universes are rendered with bright colors and tones of cel shading, with the Amazing universe given a traditional comic feel based on those of 1960s classic comic book art styles, while the Ultimate universe was meant to evoke more modern comics from the early 2000s. In contrast, the Noir and 2099 universes are rendered with realistic graphics, with the 2099 universe given a futuristic feel while the Noir universe was given a "very dark, very gritty" appearance. The developers also worked closely with Marvel Comics to create new versions of characters not seen before in a particular universe, such as Hobgoblin 2099, Hammerhead Noir, and Doctor Octopus 2099. The story for the game was written by Amazing Spider-Man writer Dan Slott and later provided him with an inspiration for the Spider-Verse comic book crossover event, which saw dozens of Spider-Men from alternate realities teaming up.

Several pre-order bonuses were offered for the PlayStation 3 and Xbox 360 versions prior to release. Players who pre-ordered at GameStop received a Cosmic Spider-Man pack, which provided a Cosmic Spider-Man outfit for each Spider-Man. It was later included as a free bonus on the PC version, along with some minor fixes, which were not patched on the console versions. The Cosmic Spider-Man pack was later publicly released as downloadable content for the Xbox 360 on October 28, and for the PlayStation 3 on November 2, 2010. Pre-orders via Amazon.com included early access to Spider-Man 2099's Iron Spider costume and a book containing concept art for the game. Kmart pre-orders offered early access to Amazing Spider-Man's Scarlet Spider costume, while Best Buy included early access to the Negative Zone costume for Spider-Man Noir. Wal-Mart offered a 20-page comic book for online pre-orders of the game. All the three costumes can otherwise be unlocked with cheat codes on copies of the non-DS versions of the game.

Shattered Dimensions was de-listed from the PlayStation Network and Xbox Live marketplaces in 2014 following the expiration of Activision's existing licensing deal with Marvel. The game was re-released via Steam on October 24, 2015, but was later removed on April 1, 2017.

== Reception ==
Reception

Aggregate score
Aggregator	Score
Metacritic	DS: 73/100; PS3: 74/100; WII: 75/100; X360: 76/100; PC: 68/100

Review scores
Publication	Score
Destructoid	6/10
Eurogamer	7/10
Game Informer	8.5/10
GamePro	4.5/5
GameRevolution	B
GameSpot	7.5/10
GameTrailers	7/10
GameZone	8/10; DS: 7.5/10
IGN	8/10; DS/WII: 7.5/10
Joystiq	3.5/5
Nintendo Power	WII: 8/10; DS: 7/10
Official Xbox Magazine (US)	7.5/10
PC Gamer (US)	50%
The A.V. Club	B+
The Escapist	3/5

The game received mostly positive reviews from critics. Metacritic gave it a score of 73 out of 100 for the DS version; 74 out of 100 for the PlayStation 3 version; 76 out of 100 for the Xbox 360 version; 75 out of 100 for the Wii version; and 68 out of 100 for the PC version.

IGN gave the PlayStation 3 and Xbox 360 versions eight out of ten and said, "Spider-Man: Shattered Dimensions has a lot of great things going for it", but scored the Wii version half a point lower despite being nearly identical to these two versions due to that version lacking a button to center the camera. Game Informer awarded it 8.5 out of 10 and said it "delivers a non-stop action ride with something new around every corner". GamesRadar gave it three-and-a-half stars out of five and said "Shattered Dimensions is a good game, but it fell short of an Ultimate Marvel Team-Up". GamePro gave the Xbox 360 version four and a half out of five stars and said, "thankfully, [Spider-Man's] latest adventure, Shattered Dimensions, is one of his best yet, offering four unique worlds, classic Spidey action, and an engaging story that puts it near the top of the franchise both in terms of quality and impact". X-Play gave the game four stars out of five and said it "streamlines the usual trappings of the genre to focus on combat and personality. It's true that the linear gameplay and old-school combat sensibilities don't put it on par with Arkham Asylum, but the game succeeds regardless. It's fun, fast-paced, and long enough to make it well worth checking out". 1UP.com gave it a B and stated, "the change in combat options is a welcome addition, I just wish that the story had delivered on the comic legacy of one of Marvel's more enduring heroes".

Non-video-game publications gave some strong praise for the game. The A.V. Club gave the Xbox 360 version a B+ and stated: "Filled with countless remember-when moments—as in Remember when you outran that wave of sand?— Shattered Dimensions is less literary and artful than Batman: Arkham Asylum, but it's far more fun". The Daily Telegraph gave it seven out of ten and stated, "the combat, and it's worth noting that this makes up the majority of the game, is superb. It's not particularly deep nor clever, but it's immensely rewarding, as too are the scripted first person sections which exist purely to, yes, let you punch things in the face". However, The Escapist gave the Xbox 360 version three stars out of five and said, "creative set-pieces and an awesome concept can only hide a repetitious game structure for so long - and the stealth sections that mix it up are just frustrating".

The Nintendo DS version of the game drew mixed reviews. IGN praised the visuals, feeling that they stayed true to the comics. Reviewers felt that overall the 2.5D Metroid-style gameplay was enjoyable, and fit the DS well. Sounds and voice acting were also praised. Some reviewers felt the game was too short, and that not enough emphasis was put on exploring the open world.

== Legacy ==
The premise of a crossover between different versions of Spider-Man that was used in Shattered Dimensions became the inspiration for the 2014 comic book storyline Spider-Verse (the main story of which was also scripted by Dan Slott), which would go on to become one of the most popular and media adapted Spider-Man story arcs, including a 2018 animated Academy Award winning film titled Spider-Man: Into the Spider-Verse, which was later used as the starting point for the Spider-Verse animated franchise. Despite the film borrowing no inspiration from Shattered Dimensions itself, all four playable Spider-Men from the game appear in Into the Spider-Verse, in varying capacities.
