= Gentleman (character) =

The Gentleman
- Mike Zeck's rendition of Gustav Fiers in the "Sinister Six Trilogy"

Publication information
- First appearance: Spider-Man: The Gathering Of The Sinister Six (1999)
- Created by: Adam-Troy Castro

In-story information
- Alter ego: Gustav Fiers
- Team affiliations: Sinister Six
- Abilities: Virtually unlimited resources Exceptional intellect

The Gentleman (Gustav Fiers) is a supervillain and an enemy of the Marvel Comics superhero Spider-Man. The character first appeared in a trilogy of Spider-Man novels written by Adam-Troy Castro before appearing within the comic books themselves.

The Gentleman appeared in The Amazing Spider-Man (2012) and The Amazing Spider-Man 2 (2014), portrayed by Michael Massee.

== Publication history ==
The Gentleman was introduced in Adam-Troy Castro's novel, Spider-Man: The Gathering of the Sinister Six. His brother, Karl Fiers, killed Spider-Man's parents. The Gentleman appears in the novels Spider-Man: Revenge of the Sinister Six, and Spider-Man: Secret of the Sinister Six, in which he was killed off.

The character made his comic Book debut in Civil War II: Kingpin #4, published in October 2016 as part of the "Civil War II" storyline.

== Fictional character biography ==
=== In the novels ===
Born Gustav Fiers, the man who would become known as the Gentleman went on to develop a lethal reputation in the criminal underworld, known for conducting elaborate plans to increase his own wealth, involved behind the scenes in various significant events in global history. He possessed a strong disdain for the rest of humanity, considering the majority of the human race common wastes of space incapable of having any real impact on anyone or anything else save for providing raw materials or cannon fodder for the 'superior breed' such as himself, although he wouldn't allow this to affect business deals due to the potential barriers against useful profit- enjoying visiting the poorer parts of the world so that he could see evidence of this belief. Despite his disdain for humanity, he could still form friendships with others, learning over time that he genuinely cared for his younger brother and developing a strong respect for the Red Skull, providing him with various information and resources during the Second World War even if he didn't share the Skull's prejudices and moral beliefs.

In the 1930s, Fiers had a series of confrontations with Doctor George Williams of the US Treasury, with Williams playing a key role in a crucial defeat of one of Fiers' plans. In response, Fiers not only arranged for Williams' wife to be killed by a bomb on their wedding night, but even sent Williams a congratulatory telegram timed to arrive just after the bomb went off. As a result, Williams spent the next sixty years hunting Fiers, becoming the most renowned expert on the criminal.

At some point in his career, he nearly killed the Canadian operative known as Logan, but Logan was saved by the actions of Richard and Mary Parker, who had been working as double agents in Fiers' organization. When Fiers learned that the Parkers were now employed by Albert Malik, the second Red Skull, he put aside his usual disdain for Malik – who he acknowledged as a pretender to the title and regarded as operating out of his league – to warn him about the Parkers, requesting in return only that he spare the Parkers' son Peter so that he could be more of a challenge later in life.

As Peter Parker grew up, Fiers' agents learned about the accident that allowed Peter to become Spider-Man, but although amused at this turn of events, he kept Peter's identity to himself, even killing the investigators who had brought him this information. During this time, Fiers acquired a ward in the form of a young woman known as Pity, the daughter of unspecified old enemies of his who possessed enhanced strength, speed, and a form of psionically induced darkness, whom he brutally forced to serve him through a twisted form of brainwashing whereby she would hate him and yet be incapable of defying him. He also formed a working relationship with Peter's first adversary, the Chameleon, although the Chameleon was unaware of Fiers' interest in Spider-Man. As superhumans became more common, Fiers adopted the code name of 'the Gentleman' to better fit in with this new world. However, when Fiers learned that Peter's actions had resulted in the death of his brother – who was acting as the Skull's assassin The Finisher – he vowed to devise a plan that would thoroughly devastate Peter Parker's life and overshadow all his old victories.

Eventually arriving in New York, Fiers arranged for the Chameleon to recruit Spider-Man's enemies Doctor Octopus, Electro, Mysterio and the Vulture to form a new incarnation of the Sinister Six (with Pity as the sixth member of the team). As the first part of Fiers' plan, he arranged for the various members of the Six to mount a 'Day of Terror', with four of them taking hostages at various points around the city while Electro and Pity stole an initially unidentified tank from a secret storage facility (concealing Electro's absence by having Mysterio pose as Electro). This culminated in a battle in the Daily Bugle that ended with Fiers revealing his role in events to Spider-Man, as well as his role in the Parkers' deaths and some details of Pity's background, but Spider-Man was unable to capture the Gentleman at this time.

While Spider-Man and the strategic action group S.A.F.E. made contact with George Williams to conduct more research into the Gentleman, Fiers began to buy up various works of art from around the world, also planting a bomb in the Parker household while Peter was absent. After another raid by the Six ended with them stealing a powerful electro-magnetic generator, S.A.F.E. realized that the Gentleman intended to use Electro to trigger the generator and create an electro-magnetic pulse in downtown Manhattan that would have erased all computer records- Spider-Man noting that the need for Electro to power the generator was Fiers' public reason for using the Six instead of more manageable mercenaries, although his private reason was his vendetta against Peter Parker- with Fiers subsequently releasing the contents of the stolen tank from his private plane; a special catalyst that would essentially destroy all ink it came in contact with, erasing all paper records as well as electronic ones. The resulting loss of information would trigger a worldwide financial collapse, as gang warfare became the only way to survive amid the chaos and destruction caused by the detonation of the generator. Fiers had spent so much time buying works of art as he wanted to ensure that he would have material wealth available to him after the dollars he had used to pay the Six became virtually worthless.

Unfortunately for Fiers, as he prepared to depart New York as the Six arranged to set off the generator (all unaware of the Catalyst), he was taken by surprise by the Chameleon, who had posed as his driver to learn where Fiers was storing his newly acquired treasures and then shot him after reaching the plane; Fiers had always been able to see through the Chameleon's disguises in the past, but was left speculating that the Chameleon had been planning such a coup for years and simply allowed Fiers to 'recognise' him so that he could strike at the most profitable moment. Although the Chameleon-as-Fiers was then confronted by Doctor Octopus – who had deduced that Fiers had an ulterior motive beyond detonating the generator and resented his subordinate position in this current incarnation of the Six – the two villains were caught by Spider-Man and Pity; Electro, Mysterio and the Vulture had all been defeated before they could set off the generator, and Spider-Man had convinced Pity to help him find the Gentleman by pointing out the danger of Octavius's absence given his obvious vendetta against his subordinate position in the current iteration of the Sinister Six (everyone was so focused on Octavius that they failed to register the Chameleon's absence from the fight until they were already on the plane).

While Spider-Man and Pity boarded the plane, S.A.F.E. found the Gentleman dying of his wounds in the airport. In a final confrontation with his enemy, Williams mocked the Gentleman's focus on wealth now that he had lost his entire fortune through paying the Six and buying his treasures. When Fiers grimly protested that he could not die penniless, Williams mockingly tossed a penny into a corner of the hangar, noting that Fiers might manage to reach it before the bloodloss took him to Hell. Dying of his wounds with nobody to claim his body, Fiers was laid to rest in an unmarked pauper's grave, while the plane carrying most of his new treasures crashed into the sea during the fight between Spider-Man, Pity, the Chameleon and Doc Ock. Spider-Man and the Chameleon were recovered from the crash, but Octavius merely went missing for a few months after he fell out during the fight, and Pity dropped off the radar, while the bomb that Fiers had planted in the Parker house was found and disabled by Wolverine (who had learned about the Gentleman's return to action but decided that protecting Peter was more important than trying to join an already-efficient team to ensure his own revenge).

=== In comics ===
The Gentleman was revealed to have survived when he resurfaced during Civil War II as an associate of the Kingpin, marking the character's first appearance in a Marvel comic book. After S.H.I.E.L.D. announces that Fisk was killed by the Punisher, the Gentleman and Jigsaw argue over what their next course of action should be, and like the rest of the Kingpin's allies they agree to follow Fisk's protege Janus.

== Powers and abilities ==
The Gentleman has no superhuman abilities. The character uses wealth and skill at planning to pose a threat as a villain.

The Gentleman's bodyguard, Pity, has the psionic ability to create and control synthetic darkness that no light can breach; she could generate an equivalent burst of light that inspired positive emotions in those who saw it, but Fiers had apparently trained her not to use that light as he felt that it was of no use to him. Pity also has enhanced speed, strength, and reflexes sufficient to engage Spider-Man in battle.

== In other media ==
- The Gentleman, credited as "Man in the Shadows", appears in the mid-credits scene of The Amazing Spider-Man (2012), portrayed by Michael Massee.
- The Gentleman, credited as "Gustav Fiers (The Gentleman)", makes a cameo appearance in The Amazing Spider-Man 2 (2014), portrayed again by Michael Massee.

== See also ==
- List of Spider-Man enemies in other media
