= Michael Massee =

American actor (1952–2016)

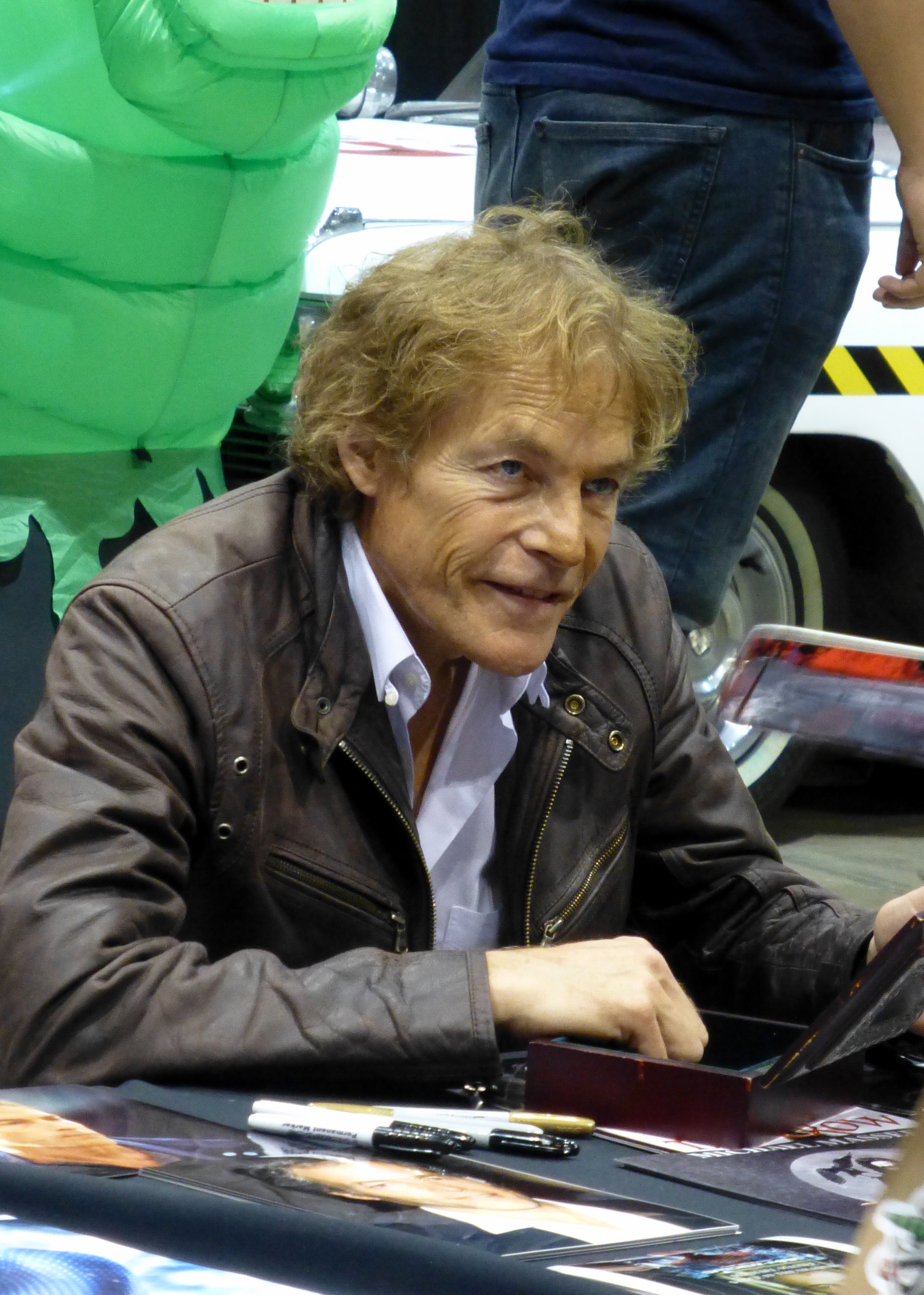
- Massee in 2014
- Born: Michael Groo Massee; September 1, 1952; Kansas City, Missouri, U.S.
- Died: October 20, 2016 (aged 64); Los Angeles, California, U.S.
- Education: Hunter College
- Occupation: Actor
- Years active: 1984–2016
- Spouse: Ellen Sussdorf (m. 1997)
- Children: 2

Michael Groo Massee (September 1, 1952 – October 20, 2016) was an American actor. Active on screen for three decades, he frequently portrayed villainous characters. His film roles include Funboy in the dark fantasy The Crow (1994), Newton in the horror anthology Tales from the Hood (1995), Andy in the neo-noir Lost Highway (1997), and the Gentleman in The Amazing Spider-Man (2012) and its 2014 sequel. Massee also voiced Bruce Banner in the first two entries of Marvel Animated Features in 2006. On television, he played Ira Gaines on the first season of the Fox action drama 24 (2001–2002), Isaiah Haden on the NBC fantasy mystery Revelations (2005), Dyson Frost on the ABC science fiction drama FlashForward (2009–2010), and Charles Hoyt on the TNT police procedural Rizzoli & Isles (2010–2013).

== Early life ==
Michael Groo Massee was born in Kansas City, Missouri, in 1952, the younger of two children born to Jack Groo Massee and his wife, Holly (née Hoover), of Prairie Village, Kansas.

The family moved to Paris, France, during Massee's childhood. After high school, Massee moved back to the United States, settling in New York, where he graduated from Hunter College and studied acting at the Neighborhood Playhouse School of the Theatre.

== Career ==
In 1993, Massee portrayed the character Funboy in the film The Crow, starring Brandon Lee. Massee was the actor who fired the shot that accidentally killed Lee on the set, as a result of an improperly prepared prop gun. Traumatized by the event, he returned to New York and took a year off from acting, and never saw the film. In an interview in 2005, Massee said that he still had nightmares about it, stating, "I don't think you ever get over something like that."

In 1995, Massee played the cop Newton in the film Tales from the Hood. He provided the voice for the villain Spellbinder in The Batman, as well as appearing on the television series 24 as the villain Ira Gaines. He provided the voice of Bruce Banner for the Ultimate Avengers animated film and its sequel, Ultimate Avengers 2. He appeared in the film Seven alongside Brad Pitt and Morgan Freeman. He appeared in David Lynch's Lost Highway as Andy. He played the physical manifestation of Management (a.k.a. Lucius Belyakovin) on HBO's Carnivàle. He guest-starred in The X-Files episode "The Field Where I Died". He also appeared in the 2005 NBC TV miniseries Revelations as the main antagonist. In 2006, he guest-starred in Criminal Minds as a serial killer on death row. He also guest-starred in the Law & Order: Criminal Intent episode "Reunion" as a rock star. He appeared in the American TV series FlashForward as villain Dyson Frost. He appeared as a hunter, Kubrick, on the series Supernatural in 2007.

Massee portrayed imprisoned serial killer Charles Hoyt in the first two seasons of the TV series Rizzoli & Isles. He played Gustav Fiers / Gentleman in 2012's The Amazing Spider-Man and reprised the role in the 2014 sequel, The Amazing Spider-Man 2. In 2014, Massee, who spoke French, appeared in the French series Interventions.

== Personal life and death ==
Massee married Ellen Sussdorf in 1997, with whom he had two children: Jack and Lily. The couple owned a clothing boutique in Los Angeles.

Massee died of stomach cancer in Los Angeles on October 20, 2016, at the age of 64.

== Filmography ==
=== Film ===
| Year | Title | Role | Notes |
|---|---|---|---|
| 1991 | My Father Is Coming | Joe | |
| 1994 | The Crow | Funboy | |
| 1994 | Six Days Six Nights | | Uncredited |
| 1994 | Home of Angels | Detective Baines | |
| 1995 | The Low Life | Bartender | |
| 1995 | Tales from the Hood | Newton | |
| 1995 | Se7en | Man in Booth at Massage Parlor | |
| 1995 | Sahara | Leroux | |
| 1995 | Burnzy's Last Call | Luke | |
| 1996 | Guy | Mark | |
| 1996 | Mojave Moon | Fifth Guy | |
| 1996 | One Fine Day | Eddie Parker | |
| 1997 | Lost Highway | Andy | |
| 1997 | The End of Violence | Guy in Bar | |
| 1997 | The Game | Airbag EMT Galliano | |
| 1997 | Playing God | Gage | |
| 1997 | Amistad | Prison Guard | |
| 1997 | Jamaica Beat | Ian Benjamin | |
| 1999 | The Florentine | Nick | |
| 1999 | Bad City Blues | Eugene Grimes | |
| 1999 | The White River Kid | Ralph Pines | |
| 2001 | Corky Romano | Angry Gunman | |
| 2001 | The Theory of the Leisure Class | McMillon | |
| 2004 | Catwoman | Armando | |
| 2006 | Ultimate Avengers | Bruce Banner (voice) | Direct-to-video |
| 2006 | Ultimate Avengers 2: Rise of the Panther | Bruce Banner (voice) | Direct-to-video |
| 2007 | Underdog | Supershep (voice) | |
| 2009 | Pandemic | Federal Prisoner | |
| 2011 | The Resident | Security Tech | |
| 2012 | The Amazing Spider-Man | Gustav Fiers / Gentleman | |
| 2012 | Reclamation | Lawrence Shiftlet | Short |
| 2013 | CBGB | Officer Stan | |
| 2014 | At the Devil's Door | Uncle Mike | |
| 2014 | The Amazing Spider-Man 2 | Gustav Fiers / Gentleman | |
| 2014 | The Last Survivors | Walker | |
| 2014 | The Wolves of Savin Hill | Theo | |
| 2016 | Everlasting | Leor | |
| 2016 | Last Man Club | John | Final film role |

=== Television ===
| Year | Title | Role | Notes |
|---|---|---|---|
| 1995 | The Marshal | Stanley | Episode: "Protection" |
| 1995 | Sahara | Leroux | Television film |
| 1996 | Picket Fences | | Episode: "Bloodlines" |
| 1996 | The X-Files | Vernon Ephesian | Episode: "The Field Where I Died" |
| 1996 | Murder One | Donny McKee | 2 episodes |
| 1997 | The Big Easy | Roland Sava | Episode: "Night Music" |
| 1997–2001 | Nash Bridges | Gerard Marquette / Harley Corzine | |
| 1997 | The Last Don | Jim Losey | Episodes #1.2 & #1.3 |
| 1998 | Millennium | Purdue | Episode: "The Pest House" |
| 1999 | L.A. Doctors | Howard | Episode: "Where the Rubber Meets the Road" |
| 2001–2002 | 24 | Ira Gaines | 12 episodes |
| 2002 | The Practice | Norman Tucker | Episode: "Fire Proof" |
| 2003–2005 | Carnivàle | Russian Soldier; Young Lucius Belyakov | 5 episodes |
| 2003 | Threat Matrix | Campbell Prokop | Episode: "Patriot Acts" |
| 2003 | Dragnet | Victor Hellman | Episode: "The Magic Bullet" |
| 2005 | Revelations | Isaiah Haden | 6 episodes |
| 2005 | The Batman | Spellbinder (voice) | Episode: "The Butler Did It" |
| 2005–2006 | Alias | Dr. Gonzalo Burris | 2 episodes |
| 2006 | Criminal Minds | Jacob Dawes | Episode: "Riding the Lightning" |
| 2007 | Cold Case | Kiril | Episode: "Cargo" |
| 2007 | Supernatural | Kubrick | 2 episodes |
| 2008 | Shark | Duncan Mercer | Episode: "Partners in Crime" |
| 2008 | Law & Order: Criminal Intent | Jordie Black | Episode: "Reunion" |
| 2009–2010 | FlashForward | D. Gibbons; Dyson Frost | 8 episodes |
| 2009 | CSI: NY | Casey Steele | Episode: "Hammer Down" |
| 2010–2013 | Rizzoli & Isles | Charles Hoyt | 4 episodes |
| 2010 | Law & Order: LA | Denis Watson | Episode: "Echo Park" |
| 2011 | Human Target | Henry Claypool | Episode: "The Trouble with Harry" |
| 2011 | House | Frank | Episode: "Twenty Vicodin" |
| 2011 | CSI: Crime Scene Investigation | Stan Richardson | Episode: "Crime After Crime" |
| 2012 | Fringe | Anson Carr | Episode: "A Short Story About Love" |
| 2012 | Dakota | George | Episode: "Down $770" |
| 2013 | Ironside | Stan Nagy | Episode: "Pentimento" |
| 2013 | Law & Order: Special Victims Unit | Michael 'Pa' Williams | Episode: "Imprisoned Lives" |
| 2014 | Interventions | Jean-Francois Montfort | |
| 2015 | The Blacklist | Karakurt | 2 episodes |

=== Video games ===
| Year | Title | Role |
|---|---|---|
| 2011 | Star Wars: The Old Republic | Additional voices |
