= Spider-Man: Edge of Time =

2011 video game

- Developer: Beenox (Note: Nintendo DS version developed by Other Ocean Interactive)
- Publisher: Activision
- Director: Gérard Lehiany
- Producer: Brant Nicholas
- Writer: Peter David
- Composer: Gerard Marino
- Series: Spider-Man
- Platforms: Nintendo DS; Nintendo 3DS; PlayStation 3; Wii; Xbox 360
- Release: NA: October 4, 2011; EU: October 14, 2011; AU: October 26, 2011
- Genre: Action-adventure
- Mode: Single-player

Spider-Man: Edge of Time is a 2011 action-adventure video game based on the Marvel Comics superhero Spider-Man, developed by Beenox and published by Activision for the PlayStation 3, Xbox 360, Wii, and Nintendo 3DS. A Nintendo DS version was also developed by Other Ocean Interactive and features several alterations. The game was directed by Gérard Lehiany and Ramiro Belanger and is a standalone sequel to 2010's Spider-Man: Shattered Dimensions.

The story, written by Peter David alongside Belanger and Lehiany, follows Peter Parker / Spider-Man and Miguel O'Hara / Spider-Man 2099 as they combat a new threat across space and time and attempt to save both of their timelines while also trying to prevent Parker's death from coming to fruition. Josh Keaton and Christopher Daniel Barnes, who voiced Ultimate Spider-Man and Spider-Man Noir, respectively, in Shattered Dimensions, returned to voice the two Spider-Men. Gameplay in Edge of Time is similar to that of its predecessor, with players alternating between Peter and Miguel, who control similarly, but have different abilities. The game also includes a "cause-and-effect" system in which one Spider-Man's actions will affect the other and vice versa.

Edge of Time, the second game to be developed by Beenox after becoming the lead developer of all Spider-Man titles published under Activision, was released on October 4, 2011, in North America, on October 14, 2011, in Europe, and on October 26, 2011, in Australia. It received generally mixed reviews from critics, who praised its writing and voice acting, but criticized the repetitive nature of its gameplay and downgrades from Shattered Dimensions. The game, along with most other titles published by Activision that had used the Marvel license, was de-listed and removed from all digital storefronts on January 1, 2014.

== Gameplay ==
Spider-Man: Edge of Time is a linear third-person action-adventure video game where the player assumes the two versions of Spider-Man, spanning across the traditional Marvel Comics universe and the futuristic 2099 universe; the game automatically switches between the two Spider-Men throughout the story. Gameplay is similar to that of its predecessor Shattered Dimensions: players can web swing, web zip, crawl walls, and use 'spider-sense' to identify enemies or objects of interest. The Spider-Man 2099 free falling sections from Shattered Dimensions also return, as does the upgrade system; XP is earned from completing various challenges with each Spider-Man, and can be used to purchase new fighting moves, increase stats, or unlock alternate costumes. Both Spider-Men have a new exclusive ability: the original Spider-Man (Peter Parker) has a "hyper-sense" mode, allowing him to move quickly, pulverize enemies one at a time or run through elaborate laser defence systems without getting hurt; Spider-Man 2099 (Miguel O'Hara), meanwhile, can create a fake simulation of himself to divert an enemy, to either attack without them noticing or to move to another area unharmed while their attack destroys something in front of him, such as a highly secure lock.

== Plot ==
In the year 2099, Miguel O'Hara / Spider-Man 2099 (Christopher Daniel Barnes) investigates Alchemax scientist Walker Sloan (Val Kilmer), discovering that the latter plans to travel back in time to establish Alchemax years before its original founding, rebuild it in his image, and dismantle its corporate rival, Stark-Fujikawa Industries, before they are established. O'Hara fails to stop Sloan from entering his time gateway and is temporarily trapped between dimensions, where he witnesses visions of his predecessor, Peter Parker / Spider-Man (Josh Keaton), being killed by an unknown assailant.

Returning to an altered version of 2099, an unaffected O'Hara uses Parker's DNA from Alchemax's archives to establish a mental, chronal link between them across time to warn Parker, now working for Alchemax, of his impending death. However, Parker refuses to heed it and travels to the 66th floor to stop a rampaging Anti-Venom (Steve Blum), forcing O'Hara to head to his own 66th floor. Along the way, the Spider-Men discover Sloan has built another gateway in Parker's time, creating a "quantum causality field" and linking their time periods; causing actions in the past to directly alter the future.

Arriving at the 66th floor, Parker finds himself confronted by Anti-Venom, Sloan, and Alchemax's head scientist, Dr. Otto Octavius (Dave B. Mitchell). He battles Anti-Venom, who drains his powers to the point of death. Before Anti-Venom can kill him, O'Hara pulls Parker through the gateway and places him in a containment unit to heal while he travels to the past and defeats Anti-Venom, breaking the chips that allowed Sloan to control him. Furious at Sloan for using him, Anti-Venom attacks him and Octavius and inadvertently pushes them into the gateway, destabilizing it and trapping the Spider-Men in each other's time periods.

While attempting to repair the gateway, O'Hara saves Mary Jane Watson (Laura Vandervoort) from a near-death situation while Parker fights clones of Black Cat (Katee Sackhoff). All the while, both Spider-Men find themselves being attacked by inter-dimensional tentacles. Using Alchemax's archives, the Spider-Men successfully fix the gateway, though Parker encounters his future self, who used an anti-aging drug to become Alchemax's CEO and wishes to use Sloan's portal for his own ends.

Eventually, the Spider-Men successfully return to their original time periods, but a monster resembling Anti-Venom with Octavius' tentacles follows Parker through as the gateway creates a "time storm". Dubbing it "Atrocity" (Fred Tatasciore), Parker evades the monster while attempting to secure DNA samples from it for O'Hara. Analyzing the samples, O'Hara discovers Atrocity is a combination of Sloan, Anti-Venom, and Octavius and theorizes that forcing it back into the gateway should disrupt the time storm. However, the CEO contacts O'Hara and reveals his intent to harness the storm's quantum energy so he can rewrite history in his image. While Parker lures Atrocity back to the gateway and eventually sends it through, O'Hara does the same with the CEO. This collapses the gateway, ending the time storm and reversing all of Sloan's changes, with only the two Spider-Men remembering the events that were erased. As Parker questions why that is, O'Hara offers to give him a lecture on time travel.

== Development and marketing ==
The four bonus pre-order costumes

Information on the game was first released at WonderCon on April 2, 2011.

Customers who pre-ordered the game at GameStop got early access to bonus downloadable alternate costumes inspired from the Identity Crisis storyline, while pre-orders from Amazon.com allowed the customer to unlock Spider-Man's Future Foundation costume for the PlayStation 3 and Xbox 360 versions early in the game. Customers who pre-ordered the game at Best Buy got early access to Spider-Man's Big Time costume. The Spider-Man costume worn by Miles Morales, Peter Parker's successor in the Ultimate Marvel universe, was also available. Bombastic Bag-Man, The Spider-Armor, Cosmic Spider-Man, Cosmic Spider-Man 2099, Iron Spider, Secret War, 1602 Spider-Man, Scarlet Spider and Negative Zone costumes can be unlocked if a player has a save game of Shattered Dimensions on their PlayStation 3, Xbox 360, or Wii.

=== Music ===
The original score music was written by Gerard Marino, lead composer of the God of War series. The PlayStation 3 version of the game is the only version to feature DTS surround sound.

== Reception ==
Reception

Aggregate score
Aggregator	Score
Metacritic	3DS: 50/100; DS: 50/100; PS3: 58/100; WII: 62/100; X360: 57/100

Review scores
Publication	Score
Destructoid	5/10
Game Informer	6.5/10
GameSpot	6/10
GamesRadar+	3/5
Giant Bomb	2/5
IGN	4.5/10
Nintendo Life	5/10 (3DS)
Nintendo World Report	4.5/10 (3DS); 6/10 (DS)

Spider-Man: Edge of Time received mixed reviews. McKinley Noble of GamePro highly criticized the game, pointing out that it ultimately doesn't live up to Shattered Dimensions, only giving Edge of Time a "fair" rating of 3 out of 5. Joystiq was more critical, giving the game 2.5/5 and criticizing Beenox's misuse of the Spider-Man character. IGN gave the PS3 and Xbox 360 versions a 4.5 out of 10, but gave the Wii version a 6.0 and the Nintendo 3DS version a 5.5. GameSpot gave the game a 6 out of 10, saying that it "tells an enjoyably absurd time-hopping tale, but stepping into the tights of its two heroes doesn't feel as empowering as it should". Game Informer gave it a 6.5, saying "Edge of Time is a major step back from the formula that worked." Destructoid gave the game a 5 out of 10. GameTrailers gave the game a 5.4 out of 10, praising the story and voice acting, but criticizing the repetition of the gameplay.
