= Spider-Man: Friend or Foe =

2007 video game

- North American cover art
- Developers: Artificial Mind & Movement (DS, PSP); Beenox (Windows); Next Level Games (PS2, Wii, X360)
- Publisher: Activision
- Director: Jason Carr
- Designers: Brandon Gill; Jeff King
- Programmers: Steven Brekelmans; Dave Forshaw
- Artist: Barret Chapman
- Composer: James L. Venable
- Series: Spider-Man
- Platforms: Nintendo DS; PlayStation 2; Wii; Windows; Xbox 360; PlayStation Portable
- Release: DS, PS2, Wii, Win, X360: NA: October 2, 2007; AU: October 10, 2007; EU: October 12, 2007; PlayStation Portable: NA: October 2, 2007; AU: October 31, 2007; EU: November 2, 2007
- Genres: Action-adventure, beat 'em up, Platformer
- Modes: Single-player, multiplayer

Spider-Man: Friend or Foe is a 2007 action-adventure beat 'em up platform game, based on the Marvel Comics character Spider-Man. The game borrows characters and designs from Sam Raimi's Spider-Man trilogy, with a plot that is non-canon to the films and therefore taking place within a divergent timeline where the villains seen in the films managed to survive. It features two player co-op gameplay, where one player controls Spider-Man and another one of his allies. The storyline of the game revolves around P.H.A.N.T.O.M.s, dangerous creatures created by mixing symbiotes with holographic technology, which a mysterious villain plans to use to take over the world. This villain has also captured and brainwashed many of Spider-Man's foes to help him acquire meteor shards that will strengthen his army. After being recruited by S.H.I.E.L.D., Spider-Man journeys across the globe to retrieve these shards himself and recruit more allies to his cause.

According to the company report, Friend or Foe is a unique take on the film trilogy. The game reinterprets the films' moments and battles with a humorous twist, while allowing players to team up with famous heroes from the Marvel Universe to defeat villains in epic boss battles, whom they then convert into sidekicks that accompany them for the rest of their journey. The game was published by Activision for Nintendo DS, PlayStation 2, Wii, Windows, Xbox 360, and PlayStation Portable in October 2007. It received generally mixed reviews from critics, who felt that it did not live up to its premise and found it too repetitive and easy.

Spider-Man: Friend or Foe, along with most other games published by Activision that had used the Marvel license, was de-listed and removed from all digital storefronts on January 1, 2014, following the expiration of the license.

== Gameplay ==
Functioning as a classic 3D level-based beat 'em up, Spider-Man: Friend or Foe has Spider-Man and his allies enter world levels via the Helicarrier, which serves as the main hub. Players will primarily control Spider-Man, though they are able to switch to the sidekick accompanying him at any point during a level. A second player has the option to join in and play as the sidekick. Each character has their own unique combat style. New sidekicks are recruited as the story progresses, and may be either heroes or villains, the latter of whom need to be defeated in a boss battle first. The boss battles however only feature Spider-Man as the sole playable character and not the sidekick character (however, the PSP version does feature the sidekick character in boss battles).

Players can acquire tokens for upgrading combat abilities, power-ups that can temporarily enhance the player, and DNA Helix collectibles that unlock additional content, such as character bios and concept art. In addition, players can find secret rooms throughout the levels that, once cleared of enemies, will be unlocked for use in the two-player versus mode.

All characters can be upgraded via a technology tree. Spider-Man himself has the most extensive upgrades to his combat abilities, with three entirely separate interchangeable web modes that can be unlocked and utilized (web line, web shoot, and web stun). Each other character has one unlockable special move. Spider-Man and his allies can also perform Hero Strikes that wipe out entire waves of enemies. Each Hero Strike is different depending on the used ally, though the effect is the same. Hero Strikes can only be performed any spending tokens that can be found in the world or purchased from the upgrade store.

== Plot ==
The game's opening cutscene shows Spider-Man fighting the Green Goblin, Doctor Octopus, the Sandman, and Venom, with assistance from the New Goblin. After the villains are defeated, the group is attacked by a number of symbiote-like creatures. Before they get the chance to fight them, the villains and the New Goblin are teleported away by an unknown force, while Spider-Man is rescued by S.H.I.E.L.D. Aboard their Helicarrier, Spider-Man meets Nick Fury, who identifies the creatures that attacked him as P.H.A.N.T.O.M.s (Perpetual Holographic Avatar Nano-Tech Offensive Monsters), and explains that the meteor which brought the Venom symbiote to Earth broke into multiple shards in the planet's atmosphere, which landed in various locations across the globe. Reportedly, someone has already retrieved one shard, using it to create the P.H.A.N.T.O.M.s, and is seeking the rest to strengthen the creatures and take over the world. Now, Spider-Man is tasked with finding the remaining shards before they fall into the wrong hands.

To aid in his quest, Spider-Man is given several S.H.I.E.L.D. operatives as sidekicks, starting with the Prowler and Silver Sable. (Note: Silver Sable is exclusive to the Microsoft versions (Xbox 360 and Windows) of the game) In Tokyo, Spider-Man encounters Black Cat, whom S.H.I.E.L.D. sent ahead to investigate, and convinces her to join his team. He also finds Doctor Octopus at his secret lab, where the latter is attempting to recreate his fusion power experiment, and the Green Goblin at the Oscorp Tower, who has already found a meteor shard. Since both villains were placed under mind-control by the P.H.A.N.T.O.M.s' creator, they now seek revenge against them, and reluctantly join forces with Spider-Man after he defeats and frees them from the mind-control. On Tangaroa Island, Spider-Man meets another S.H.I.E.L.D. operative, Iron Fist, and defeats a mind-controlled Scorpion and Rhino, retrieving another meteor shard in the process. In Cairo, Spider-Man recruits the Lizard (portrayed here as an antihero), and defeats a brainwashed Sandman, who had a meteor shard in his possession. In Transylvania, Spider-Man encounters Blade, who is hunting the mind-controlled Venom, and recruits him. He eventually finds Venom and frees him from the mind-control, retrieving his meteor shard in the process. Although Spider-Man is initially reluctant to recruit Venom to the team, Fury persuades him to do so after Venom is revealed to have crucial information on the identity of the P.H.A.N.T.O.M.s' creator, whom Venom claims has a "bubble for a head".

Although Spider-Man's team was able to retrieve all the meteor shards, the P.H.A.N.T.O.M.s have been shown to be growing stronger with each location they visited, to the point they now resemble symbiotes, without any sign of technology in them. In Nepal, Spider-Man's search for the final meteor shard leads him to encounter the P.H.A.N.T.O.M.s' creator: Mysterio. Mysterio steals most of Spider-Man's shards and escapes, leaving his P.H.A.N.T.O.M.s to fight the web-slinger. Outnumbered, Spider-Man decides to crush the last shard in his hand, causing him to regain his symbiote black suit, which enhances his powers. Fighting his way past the last remaining P.H.A.N.T.O.M.s to reach Mysterio's hideout, Spider-Man ultimately defeats the villain and claims the meteor shards. After Mysterio is imprisoned (off-screen), Spider-Man returns to the Helicarrier, where he has the black suit removed and gives the meteor shards to Fury. Fury thanks Spider-Man for his help and reveals that S.H.I.E.L.D. has paid off all his school loans as a token of appreciation, before sending him home. Later, Fury analyzes the shards and, believing that Mysterio was on to something, decides to further study them, telling his computer to initiate "Project Carnage." After completing the main story, the New Goblin is unlocked as a playable character.

=== PSP differences ===
In the PSP version of the game, Transylvania is replaced with an unnamed island in the Mediterranean Sea, where players must explore underground city ruins and catacombs. While Spider-Man still recruits both Blade and Venom here, he also encounters a mind-controlled Electro, whom he defeats and recruits to the team. In addition to Electro, this version also features Carnage as a playable character, and lacks Silver Sable, Scorpion, and the Lizard.

== Development ==
Spider-Man: Friend or Foe was originally announced via a promotional page on the back of the Spider-Man 3 video game instruction booklet. The teaser stated that the game would be "A new twist on the legend. A new take on the movies". The game's website shows a few screenshots of the game and the Green Goblin makes an appearance. The game has a very different engine and style as compared to the previous official film tie-ins. It was developed by three different companies depending on the console. The Wii, Xbox 360, and PlayStation 2 versions were created by Next Level Games. Beenox developed the Windows edition. Artificial Mind And Movement developed the Nintendo DS and PlayStation Portable versions of the game.

== Reception ==
Reception

Aggregate scores
Aggregator	Score
GameRankings	(PS2) 63.64% (Wii) 61.52% (PSP) 60.80% (X360) 60.35% (PC) 59.62% (DS) 55.04%
Metacritic	(PS2) 62/100 (X360) 60/100 (Wii) 59/100 (PSP) 58/100 (PC) 57/100 (DS) 55/100

Review scores
Publication	Score
Eurogamer	3/10
Game Informer	4.5/10
GamePro	3.5/5
GameRevolution	(X360) C (Wii) C−
GameSpot	7/10
GameSpy	(X360 & Wii) 4/5 (DS) 2/5
GameTrailers	5.8/10
GameZone	(PS2) 7.9/10 (DS) 7.5/10 (PC) 7.1/10 (PSP) 6.9/10 (Wii) 6.5/10 (X360) 6.4/10
IGN	4.9/10
Official Xbox Magazine (US)	6/10

GameRankings and Metacritic gave it a score of 55.04% and 55 out of 100 for the DS version, 59.62% and 57 out of 100 for the PC version, 63.64% and 62 out of 100 for the PlayStation 2 version, 60.80% and 58 out of 100 for the PSP version, 60.35% and 60 out of 100 for the Xbox 360 version, and 61.52% and 59 out of 100 for the Wii version. IGN gave the game a score of 4.9 out of 10, complaining about its repetitiveness and lack of challenge.
