= Steel Spider =

Marvel Comics superhero character

- The Steel Spider. Art by Mike Deodato.

Publication information
- Publisher: Marvel Comics
- First appearance: (As Ollie Osnick): The Spectacular Spider-Man #72 (Nov 1982) (As Spider-Kid): The Amazing Spider-Man #263 (April 1985) (As Steel Spider): Spider-Man Unlimited #5 (May 1994)
- Created by: Bill Mantlo (writer); Ed Hannigan (artist)

In-story information
- Alter ego: Oliver "Ollie" Osnick
- Species: Human
- Team affiliations: The Misfits
- Notable aliases: Kid Ock, Spider-Kid
- Abilities: Gifted inventor Genius-level intellect Wears mechanical spider legs and gauntlets containing a grappling hook launcher and pepper spray blasters

Steel Spider (Oliver "Ollie" Osnick) is a superhero appearing in American comic books published by Marvel Comics. Oliver Osnnick started out as a teenager who idolized Doctor Octopus until Spider-Man saved him following a misunderstanding and he took up a path that led to him becoming Steel Spider.

== Publication history ==
Ollie Osnick first appeared in The Spectacular Spider-Man #72 as Kid Ock and was created by Bill Mantlo and Ed Hannigan. He first appeared as Spider-Kid in The Amazing Spider-Man #263, and as Steel Spider in Spider-Man Unlimited #5.

== Fictional character biography ==
Ollie Osnick as Spider-Kid in Amazing Spider-Man #263. Art by Ron Frenz.

Ollie Osnick is an overweight, gifted teenager who idolized Doctor Octopus. Using his genius, Ollie designs his own mechanical tentacles and calls himself Kid Ock. He influences a group of kids to dress up as super-villains, but they soon ran out on him. Ollie eventually runs away from home and breaks into a toy store.

There, he renders an elderly guard unconscious, although Ollie believes he has killed him. When Spider-Man arrives on the scene, he believes that it was actually Doctor Octopus at work, so he chases Ollie. Spider-Man realizes in time that it was not Doctor Octopus he was facing. When Spider-Man and Ollie fall into a water tank, Spider-Man easily rips apart one of his tentacles, which he was never able to do with Doctor Octopus. Dragging Ollie to the surface, he learns it was actually Ollie he was chasing. By then, the guard regains consciousness, and Spider-Man returns Ollie home safely.

Impressed with Spider-Man, Ollie modifies his tentacles into spider-legs and dons a Spider-Man Halloween costume, calling himself Spider-Kid. Ollie's heroic activities often result in him having to be saved by Spider-Man. He, Frog-Man, and Toad form a short-lived super-hero team called the Misfits. Ollie is eventually convinced to hang up his costume.

While in college, Ollie still fantasizes about being a hero, continuing to invent new weapons and modify his suit. When his girlfriend is attacked and paralyzed by muggers, Ollie seeks revenge and creates the identity of "Steel Spider", utilizing a dark blue costume and new weapons. Steel Spider locates and brutalizes his girlfriend's attackers. He removes his costume, realizing that he never wanted to be a vigilante and would rather build a life with the girl he loves.

During the "Civil War" storyline, Ollie Osnick opposes the Superhero Registration Act. As an unregistered superhero, Ollie is targeted by the Thunderbolts. Venom bites off and eats Ollie's left arm, for which he is reprimanded by Norman Osborn. Ollie survives and is incarcerated in Negative Zone Prison Alpha.

During the "Heroic Age" storyline, Captain America researches Steel Spider and places his incarceration under reconsideration.

== Powers and abilities ==
Ollie Osnick has no superpowers, but he is a gifted inventor with a genius-level intellect. His suit has mechanical spider legs as well as gauntlets that contain a grappling hook launcher and pepper spray blasters.

== Other versions ==
Steel Spider in the MC2 timeline.

A possible future version of Ollie Osnick / Steel Spider appears in the MC2 story Spider-Girl #32. Having retained the use of the Steel Spider identity, he modifies his suit into a powerful exoskeleton and becomes a highly respected superhero. However, his wife leaves him, leading to him taking out his frustrations on criminals. After helping Spider-Girl and American Dream defeat the Sons of the Serpent, Osnick reforms and sets about rebuilding his personal life.

== In other media ==
=== Television ===
- Ollie Osnick / Steel Spider appears in Ultimate Spider-Man, voiced by Jason Marsden. This version is a teenage prodigy from Boston and a fan of Spider-Man.
- Steel Spider appears in Spider-Man, voiced by Josh Keaton. This version is a student at the Osborn Academy. After joining their Osborn Commandos, Doctor Octopus brainwashes them and Spider-Man to form the Sinister Six only to be thwarted by Harry Osborn / Hobgoblin.

=== Video games ===
Steel Spider appears as a playable character in Spider-Man Unlimited.
