= List of Spider-Man (2017 TV series) episodes =

Marvel's Spider-Man is an American animated television series based on the Spider-Man comics published by Marvel Comics. 58 episodes of Marvel's Spider-Man have aired, concluding its third season, entitled Marvel's Spider-Man: Maximum Venom.

== Series overview ==
Season	Episodes	Originally released	
Season	Episodes	First released	Last released
Origin Shorts	6	July 24, 2017	July 29, 2017
1	26	August 19, 2017	February 18, 2018
2	26	June 18, 2018	December 1, 2019
3	6	April 19, 2020	October 25, 2020

== Episodes ==
=== Origin shorts (2017) ===
No. overall	No. in season	Title	Directed by	Written by	Original release date	Prod. code
S1	1	"Introduction!"	Dan Duncan	Kevin Shinick	July 24, 2017	103a
Peter Parker / Spider-Man recounts his origin story: Two weeks ago, he and his class were at a field trip at Oscorp which was chaperoned by Peter's best friend and the son of Oscorp's CEO, Norman Osborn, Harry, who has recently started attending Horizon High, a school for geniuses. While working in a scientific exhibit with Liz Allan, Peter is bitten by a genetically-modified spider.: Villains: None
S2	2	"Observation!"	Dan Duncan	Kevin Shinick	July 25, 2017	103b
After escaping to the bathroom, Peter decides to use the scientific method to discover what is happened to him, as he discovers that the spider bite has granted him spider-like abilities, including improved vision and the ability to adhere to ceilings. Going by the first step: Observation, Peter further learns that has a spider's "sixth sense" which allows him to predict danger. He soon tests and enjoys his newfound agility and strength.: Villains: None
S3	3	"Hypothesis!"	Dan Duncan	Kevin Shinick	July 26, 2017	103c
Peter moves on to the second step of the scientific method: Hypothesis. Hypothesizing that he will be using his powers for advantages, Peter builds web-shooters to gain the ability to create a web, further creating a web mask to conceal his identity so he does not become a viral sensation. He starts filming and documenting his abilities in the form of video diaries.: Villains: None
S4	4	"Prediction!"	Dan Duncan	Kevin Shinick	July 27, 2017	103d
On the third step: Prediction, Peter visits a fortune teller who predicts "fame and fortune" in his future. She confirms he will join the entertainment industry. Agreeing, Peter decides to use his abilities to test them out by performing on the professional wrestling show, So, You Wanna Be a Wrestler?. He makes a costume using one of his Aunt May's old sweatshirt and sweatpants to compete in the wrestling competition.: Villains: None
S5	5	"Experimentation!"	Dan Duncan	Kevin Shinick	July 28, 2017	103e
On the fourth step of the scientific method: Experimentation, Peter makes his wrestling debut as "The Spider" to face professional wrestler Bonesaw McGee. While being interviewed by the film crew prior to the match, a burglar escapes when Peter hesitates to stop him. He faces and defeats McGee easily by using his powers, gaining a trophy in the process.: Villains: Burglar, Bonesaw McGee; Note: Stan Lee cameos in this episode as the camera man filming "the Spider" with the trophy
S6	6	"Conclusion!"	Dan Duncan	Kevin Shinick	July 29, 2017	103f
Peter returns home to discover that his Uncle Ben was killed by a burglar during a home break-in. Peter dons his costume and as "the Spider", attacks and corners the burglar, discovering it is the same burglar he hesitated to stop in the wrestling arena, and leaves him to the police. At home, Peter has decided to follow Ben's philosophy, "with great power comes great responsibility", and become the masked vigilante Spider-Man.: Villains: Burglar

=== Season 1 (2017–18) ===
No. overall	No. in season	Title	Directed by	Written by	Original release date	Prod. code	US viewers (millions)
0	1	"Origins"	Dan Duncan	Kevin Shinick	July 24, 2017	103	N/A
Peter Parker / Spider-Man recounts his origin story: Two weeks ago, he and his class were at a field trip at Oscorp which was chaperoned by Peter's best friend and the son of Oscorp's CEO, Norman Osborn, Harry, who has recently started attending Horizon High, a school for geniuses. While working in a scientific exhibit, Peter is bitten by a genetically-modified spider, which he discovers has granted him spider-like abilities, including improved vision and the ability to adhere to ceilings. After escaping the bathroom, Peter decides to use the scientific method to discover what is happened to him. He further learns that has a spider's "sixth sense". He builds web-shooters to gain the ability to create a web, further creating a web mask to conceal his identity so he does not become a viral sensation. He starts filming and documenting his abilities in the form of video diaries. Peter decides to hypothesis his powers, visiting a fortune teller to get her to hypothesize how to use his abilities. She confirms he will join the entertainment industry. Agreeing, Peter decides to use his abilities to test them out by performing on the professional wrestling show, So, You Wanna Be a Wrestler?. Peter makes his wrestling debut as "The Spider" to face professional wrestler Bonesaw McGee. While being interviewed by the film crew prior to the match, a burglar escapes when Peter hesitates to stop him. Peter faces and defeats McGee easily by using his powers, gaining a trophy in the process. Peter returns home to discover that his Uncle Ben was killed by a burglar during a home break-in. Peter dons his costume and as "the Spider", attacks and corners the burglar, discovering it is the same burglar he hesitated to stop in the wrestling arena. At home, Peter has decided to follow Ben's philosophy, "with great power comes great responsibility", and become the masked vigilante Spider-Man. Note: The episode is a compilation of the Origin series shorts "Introduction!", "Observation!", "Hypothesis!", "Prediction!", "Experimentation!", and "Conclusion!".
1	2	"Horizon High: Part 1"	Philip Pignotti	Kevin Shinick	August 19, 2017	101	0.19
Peter stops a group of criminals who are stealing vibranium, but fails to stop their boss Adrian Toomes / Vulture from acquiring the vibranium, as he escapes. Peter meets Harry at a café, discovering that Peter's idol and the headmaster of Horizon High, Max Modell, the genius school Harry attends, will be providing a presentation at Peter's school, Midtown High School, but he forgot to help Liz Allan set up. Liz subsequently berates Peter. Peter, Liz, and Randy Robertson praise Modell's accolades and achievements, though Midtown High science teacher Spencer Smythe and his prodigy son, Alistair mock Modell's achievements. Later, Modell presents a complex scientific equation which only Peter is able to solve. A fire starts, with Peter putting it with one of the students, Anya Corazon's vibranium device, prompting her berating. Harry introduces Peter to Modell, and the former is given the opening slot to Horizon High. Spencer, having sabotaged Harry's project earlier, blames him for starting the fire. Modell reluctantly suspends Harry, pending an investigation. Toomes attacks the school, kidnapping Modell, prompting Peter to save him, defeating Toomes in the process. In the aftermath, May agrees to allow Peter to attend Horizon while Harry attends Midtown High temporarily while Norman creates another school for geniuses.
2	3	"Horizon High: Part 2"	Philip Pignotti	Kevin Shinick	August 19, 2017	102	0.20
Peter is late for his first day at Horizon High, due to Mac Gargan / Scorpion attacking a museum. He heads to Horizon High, where he meets engineering teacher Otto Octavius and is given Harry's lab, though he is initially reluctant to use it. Modell introduces Peter to Anya and Miles Morales; the former is still upset with Peter for damaging her project, while Miles is enthusiastic about Peter. Later that night, Peter develops a new advanced suit after his original suit was damaged due to the Midtown High fire. A Spider-Slayer breaks into the vault, stealing Harry's equipment. Peter fights the robot, with help from Miles. Meanwhile, Harry and Alistair get into a fight at Midtown. Another Spider-Slayer attacks Midtown, with Peter saving Harry. Harry claims Spider-Man is a menace, while Anya, Miles, and Modell credit Spider-Man as a hero for saving their lives.
3	4	"Osborn Academy"	Sol Choi	Kevin Shinick	August 26, 2017	104	N/A
Peter fights Raymond Warren / Jackal who has stolen Stark technology. Warren escapes, though Peter meets fellow Horizon High classmate, Gwen Stacy, who criticizes his methods. Peter meets up with the Horizon High group, Modell, Anya, Miles, and Gwen at Oscorp, which is the new Oz Academy, another school for geniuses. He introduces himself formally to Gwen. Meanwhile, best friends Clayton Cole and Herman Schultz find themselves competing to get into Oz Academy, eventually drawing Peter and Warren's attention. Warren manipulates them into using their tech, with Peter defeating Warren, who escapes. Harry is suspicious of Spider-Man (who he does not know is Peter)'s activities. Peter and Harry agree at a café to never fight amongst themselves.
4	5	"A Day in the Life"	Dan Duncan	Mike Fasolo	September 2, 2017	105	0.20
While cleaning up Modell's office late at night, Peter discovers cat burglar Felicia Hardy / Black Cat stealing a substance, the V-252 symbiote. Peter tracks her, but fails to defeat her, due to her bad luck abilities. Peter creates a tracker with Harry's help, but the assignment is given a failing grade due to being late by Octavius. Meanwhile, Peter helps Modell collaborate evidence that he is innocent with help from Midtown High substitute teacher Raymond Warren. After Warren asks for a job, which Modell refuses to give him, due to his reputation. Outside, Warren pricks Aleksei Sytsevich with an unknown device. After answering study questions, Peter fights Black Cat at the comic book store, leading to a jewelry store, using her bad luck against her. Peter returns the V-252 to Max's office. As he leaves, it hints that it is alive.
5	6	"Party Animals"	Sol Choi	Sterling Gates	September 2, 2017	106	0.20
Harry calls Peter while the latter is defeating a Spider-Slayer, where it is revealed that Norman is commanding the Spider-Slayers. Peter heads to Horizon High, discovering that Harry has been cleared of all the charges. To celebrate the event, under Peter's inadvertent suggestion, they decide to have a dance. On the night of the dance, Peter meets with Harry at his house, while Norman is having a meeting with Warren, who reveals that he injected Sytsevich with a formula in exchange for a position at Oz Academy, which Norman ponders. Norman tells Harry to quit Horizon High after having created Oz Academy, which Harry reluctantly agrees to. At the dance, Sytsevich turns into the Rhino, forcing Anya, Peter, Miles, and Harry to work on a formula to change Sytsevich back. Meanwhile, Gwen discovers that Warren changed Sytsevich into the Rhino and he is The Jackal, with Peter defeating him. In the aftermath, Peter shares his Uncle Ben's advice with Gwen to comfort her over how Warren let her down.
6	7	"Sandman"	Dan Duncan	J.T. Krul	September 16, 2017	107	0.25
Peter, Miles, Anya, and Gwen head to the beach to study the V-252 for the upcoming Stark Expo. While there, Peter fights crime as Spider-Man to stop Flint Marko / Sandman. In the process, Peter takes a sample of Marko and inadvertently contacts with the V-252. At home, Peter discovers Marko has followed him, while studying him, as well as pieces of the V-252, and is attacked by him. But, after stopping him, he discovers that Marko is not evil and that he was experimented on by Hammerhead, transforming him into a sand creature, revealing that he is trying to find his daughter, Keemia. Peter and Marko find Keemia at Hammerhead's lair, where she reveals that she gained sand abilities during the experimentation as well and fights Peter and Marko. To help Marko defeat Keemia, Peter bonds with the V-252. Keemia and Marko escape, along with Hammerhead and his goons.
7	8	"Symbiotic Relationship"	Sol Choi	Kevin Burke and Chris "Doc" Wyatt	September 16, 2017	108	0.27
Peter decides to use the V-252 substance as a costume, thwarting a robbery by Advanced Idea Mechanics (A.I.M.). Peter discovers that Toomes has been released from prison by Norman so he can become a staff member at Oz Academy, but Peter nonchalantly believes that Toomes hasn't changed, stating to Harry that people don't change, despite his change in personality due to the symbiote. Norman tells Toomes he hired him to tell him Horizon High's entry in the Stark Expo. Toomes tells him about the V-252. Using Toomes' Vulture technology, Alistair breaks into Horizon High, drawing Peter's attention. He brutally attacks Alistair, resulting in Modell's berating. Peter places a tracer on Alistair, finding Toomes, not realizing that Toomes wasn't the Vulture he fought. After brutally assaulting Toomes, Harry uses Toomes' sonic device to stop the attack. The V-252 attacks Harry. Realizing the symbiote is alive, Peter decides to get rid of it, but discovers it has maintained a symbiotic relationship with him. With Norman, Toomes, and Alistair's help, Peter removes the V-252. The next day, he returns it to Modell and reveals that he stole it. Consequently, Peter's grade at the Stark Expo is revoked though Peter warns Modell that the symbiote is alive.
8	9	"Stark Expo"	Dan Duncan	Kevin Shinick	September 16, 2017	109	0.29
While patrolling the city as Spider-Man, Peter discovers an invisible individual, Ghost breaking into the Stark Expo and encounters his superhero idol, Tony Stark / Iron Man. Believing that Peter is breaking into the Stark Expo, the two briefly fight until the latter escapes. Peter warns Modell that the V-252 is alive, but Modell does not believe it, saying he has not found any evidence of it. Stark discovers that Peter and Spider-Man are the same person. At the Expo, Ghost interrupts, sabotaging every technology, including Stark's new Iron Man armor, the Mark L and Peter's costume. Using the non-technological V-252, Peter bonds with it again, revealing to Modell that it is alive to defeat Ghost. After defeating Ghost, the V-252 corrupts Peter again, forcing Stark and Peter's former high school bully, Flash Thompson to take it off him. In the aftermath, Stark takes the V-252 back to Avengers Compound while Thompson wins the Stark Expo award due to his project being the last one standing. Meanwhile, Norman admonishes Harry due to his wanting to put his glider into the Stark Expo and Modell tells Octavius that he is not allowed to work on his mechanical arms. Meanwhile, Norman gives Octavius a business card to Oz Academy. Modell also apologizes to Peter for having not believed him earlier.
9	10	"Ultimate Spider-Man"	Dan Duncan	Kevin Shinick	September 23, 2017	110	0.31
Peter discovers Miles is being bullied. After discovering Oscorp under attack, Peter heads to Oscorp, discovering it was a Spider-Slayer controlled by Spencer. Peter fails to stop it, as it detonates. Meanwhile, Miles is bitten by a radioactive spider, granting him spider-like abilities. Miles saves Peter and afterwards decides to become the second Spider-Man. Despite Peter's warnings, Miles tells Gwen and Anya of his abilities and he reveals his home address. This causes two Spider-Slayers, one commanded by Alistair and one commanded by Spencer to attack him and fight each other, forcing Miles to team up with Peter to defeat it. In the aftermath, Miles learns the purpose of a secret identity and Peter grants Miles web-shooters.
10	11	"Kraven's Amazing Hunt"	Sol Choi	Chris Cox and Kevin Shinick	September 30, 2017	111	0.25
After Peter trains Miles in battle with Gargan, they find that he was being used by Sergei Kravinoff / Kraven the Hunter so that he can hunt them on the latest episode of his TV show "Kraven's Amazing Hunt". They are unaware that Kraven has been hired by Norman to bring both Spider-Men to Oscorp for experimentation after the Spider-Slayer's failure to retrieve the stolen spider specimens. When Kraven starts veering from his deal with Norman, this causes him and Vulture to take matters into their own hands. All three are captured and Norman turns on Kraven, who narrowly escapes. Peter and Miles also escape, forcing Peter to reveal his identity to a terrified Miles, who promises to keep his secret.
11	12	"Halloween Moon"	Dan Duncan	Kevin Burke and Chris "Doc" Wyatt	October 7, 2017	112	N/A
On Halloween, Peter is heading to Horizon High for a Halloween party to meet Harry. Harry feels alone at Horizon High, blaming himself for the Rhino incident when Gwen cheers him up about it. Peter finds Avenger Hulk fighting against the Man-Wolf. Peter and Hulk's alter-ego, Bruce Banner, follow Man-Wolf to Horizon, as Peter fanboys over Banner on the way. Banner turns back into Hulk to fight Man-Wolf with help from Peter, Harry, and Gwen, defeating him and reverting him to normal. Afterwards, John Jameson and Norman have a meeting at Oscorp, where it is revealed that Norman intentionally transformed Jameson into Man-Wolf.
12	13	"Spider-Man on Ice"	Sol Choi	Sterling Gates	October 14, 2017	113	N/A
During a heat wave, Peter helps the police catch one of Hammerhead's minions, Randy Macklin. While helping Harry make a cryogenic gauntlet, Macklin escapes custody and steals their gauntlet. Harry is forced to help Peter's alter-ego, Spider-Man, face Macklin, who decides to use the gauntlet to become the supervillain Blizzard. Macklin freezes Hammerhead and his goons for mistreating him. Peter and Harry use the latter's flame sword to defeat Macklin, though Peter is concerned that the sword is unstable.
13	14	"Venom"	Dan Duncan	Kevin Shinick and Paul Giacoppo	October 21, 2017	114	0.16
Peter helps Modell clean up late at night and discovers Modell still has the V-252's container. Peter offers to throw it away, but Modell refutes him. Peter heads home but is attacked by another host of the V-252 symbiote, which Peter is unable to detect with his Spider-Sense, who Peter labels Venom. Peter finds a list of suspects and warns Modell about Venom. Peter calls Stark, but he is away in space, knowing that the V-252 is in Avengers custody. Meanwhile, Peter tutors Thompson so he can play in a football game. Thompson is heated following a conversation with a high school football team rival quarterback. After discovering a list of suspects, including Modell, due to his rivalry with Midtown High science teacher Sal Malorni. Peter realizes Thompson is Venom after Malorni and the rival quarterback were injured. At the game, Venom infects several of the rival players. With Thompson, Malorni, and Modell's help, Peter defeats Venom. Afterwards, Thompson, grateful to Peter, prevents school bullies from picking on him, solidifying a friendship with him.
14	15	"Screwball Live"	Sol Choi	Ben Joseph	October 28, 2017	115	N/A
After Peter defeats Hammerhead's goon Crusher Creel / Absorbing Man, Peter discovers viral prankster Screwball. Peter is embarrassed as multiple people, including Liz and Harry mock Spider-Man. Peter and Randy criticize Screwball. Peter, Harry, and Randy attend a speech by the latter's father, Daily Bugle employee, Robbie Robertson. In his fight with Absorbing Man, Peter obtains a flash drive, which he deciphers with help from Gwen, finding documents of Hammerhead's criminal record. Hammerhead orders Absorbing Man to find the flash drive. Hammerhead orders Absorbing Man to kidnap Screwball, believing that Peter and Screwball are working together. Screwball, who is Liz, sends a message warning Peter. Screwball tries to stop Absorbing Man, but her captures her and Randy, who she reveals her identity to, revealing that she wanted to feel important after the creation of Horizon and Oz Academy. Peter helps free Screwball, who helps him defeat Absorbing Man and Hammerhead, who are arrested after Peter exposes Hammerhead's criminal record. Peter states that he used the information to defeat them by reading Randy's blog, causing him to shrink in excitement. In the aftermath, Liz takes a break from pranking and credits Spider-Man as a hero, though Harry is still not convinced.
15	16	"The Rise of Doc Ock: Part 1"	Sol Choi	Kevin Burke and Chris "Doc" Wyatt	January 21, 2018	116	0.25
Peter and Miles complain about Octavius' behavior in class, though Gwen states that he is frustrated that Modell cancelled his mechanical arms class. A pop quiz is postponed when Crimson Dynamo breaks into Horizon. Octavius and Peter stop her, though Octavius is fused to his mechanical harness, frustrating him. With Peter's advice, Octavius decides to fight crime as "The Octopus". Octavius and Peter help defeat Crimson Dynamo as Octavius vows to fight crime.
16	17	"The Rise of Doc Ock: Part 2"	Dan Duncan	Mike Fasolo	January 21, 2018	117	0.28
Peter invites Octavius to patrol the streets with him and Miles. After saving a bridge and stopping a lizard-like creature from attacking Norman, Octavius learns about geneticist Curt Connors, visiting Oscorp. Norman reveals that Connors is the Lizard. Octavius devises a cure for Connors, though Norman steals the formula and replaces it. The formula Octavius uses enlarges Connors and destroys Horizon. With Peter and Miles' help, the three devise an antidote to cure Connors. Modell fires Octavius due to the incident, causing Octavius to work for Oz Academy. Peter confronts Norman, who reveals it was his plan to make Octavius leave Horizon for Oz Academy.
17	18	"The Rise of Doc Ock: Part 3"	Sol Choi	Kevin Shinick	January 28, 2018	118	0.31
Peter discovers evidence while spying on Norman, revealing that Norman orchestrated Harry's suspension from Horizon High. He reveals this evidence to Harry, who does not believe him and invites him to attend Oz Academy for a day while Horizon High is undergoing repairs due to the attack by the Lizard. Peter agrees, but secretly leaves class under various excuses to discover Norman's true motives, including a Spider-Man extermination program. However, the Jackal sends Sytsevich to turn several Oz Academy employees into Rhinos, forcing Harry, Norman, Peter as Spider-Man, Toomes, Octavius, and Ollie Osnick / Steel Spider to defend Oz Academy from Sytsevich and the Jackal, curing Sytsevich from Jackal's control, while Norman supposedly destroys the Jackal, which Peter does not believe. Norman offers Peter a spot on the Osborn Commandos, but Peter declines. Afterwards, after taking a pledge with Harry, Octavius inadvertently reveals that Peter is making Spider-Man's technology and gadgetry for Spider-Man, damaging their relationship further.
18	19	"The Rise of Doc Ock: Part 4"	Dan Duncan	Sterling Gates	January 28, 2018	119	0.33
Peter and Miles travel to New York Penitentiary to discover that Warren created several clones of himself in case he was caught by the police and one of the clones destroys, causing New Yorkers to believe Peter and Miles destroyed Warren, including Harry. Peter manages to convince Gwen and Harry to help him and discover from one of Warren's storage units of his clones underneath Midtown High School. Harry discovers the radioactive spiders Warren kept that bit Peter and Miles and alerts Norman. Norman arrives with the Howling Commandos–himself, Toomes, Osnick, Octavius, Sytsevich, and Alistair as Spider-Slayer. During the battle, Octavius turns the Osborn Commandos against Norman, rebranding them the Sinister Five as revenge for Norman trying to take his mechanical arms research and weaponize it. Octavius also rebrands himself as Doctor Octopus before they and the Jackal leave, leaving Norman to apparently sacrifice himself so Peter as Spider-Man can lead Harry and Gwen to safety. Harry blames Peter for his father's death, while Peter blames himself for the recent events.
19	20	"Spider-Island: Part 1"	Sol Choi	Chris Cox and Kevin Shinick	February 4, 2018	120	0.28
Peter and Miles create a new stealth suit to travel by stealth, however Peter throws it away. Meanwhile, Harry is still upset at Peter and Spider-Man (still not knowing that Peter and Spider-Man are the same person) for his father's "death". He is trying to decrypt his laptop, so that he can access weapons to use against the Jackal and Peter and Miles. Meanwhile, they discover that an unidentified individual is trying to poison the city using the stealth spider. With Gwen's help, who has developed spider powers from the explosion at Midtown High and becomes the hero Spider-Gwen, Peter, Miles, and a reluctant Harry help stop the Stealth Spider from poisoning New York. Afterwards, they discover that New Yorkers have gained spider powers as a result of the explosion from Midtown High.
20	21	"Spider-Island: Part 2"	Dan Duncan	Kevin Burke and Chris "Doc" Wyatt	February 4, 2018	121	0.34
When everyone in Manhattan starts manifesting spider powers, Spider-Gwen follows Spider-Man into thwarting a robbery by Hydra operative Crossbones. While Anya starts developing spider powers and gets a hold of them, Spider-Man and Spider-Gwen must help Black Widow track down Crossbones and his Hydra team when they plan to rob the vibranium storage vault on behalf of Arnim Zola.
21	22	"Spider-Island: Part 3"	Sol Choi	Jacob Semahn	February 11, 2018	122	0.25
Peter must find a way to cure Gwen after finding out she had mutated into a Man-Spider. Things get harder when Kraven the Hunter resurfaces and turns New York into his hunting grounds as part of his latest episode. Spider-Man, Harry, Kraven, and Anya discover that the Man-Spider who stole Peter's stealth suit was a mutated Norman.
22	23	"Spider-Island: Part 4"	Dan Duncan	Zach Craley	February 11, 2018	123	0.31
When more people turn into Man-Spiders, Peter and Harry must battle through an island of Man-Spiders to get to Norman, who appears to be controlling them all as the "Spider-King". When their attempted cure only restores Norman's mind and not his body, Peter infuses the antidote with his own blood. The boys also discover that Jackal is the real mastermind behind the Man-Spider crisis.
23	24	"Spider-Island: Part 5"	Sol Choi	Kevin Shinick	February 11, 2018	124	0.31
After being captured, Spider-Man discovers that Jackal had previously captured Miles, which explained why he could not be reached. Jackal considers both Peter and Miles to be the first Spider Soldiers. To cure the Man-Spider population of Manhattan, Spider-Man must lead Miles, Anya, and Harry on a desperate last-ditch effort to stop the Jackal.
24	25	"The Hobgoblin: Part 1"	Dan Duncan	Kevin Burke and Chris "Doc" Wyatt	February 18, 2018	125	0.21
Following the Man-Spider crisis and the destruction of Osborn Academy, Norman graduates Harry and gives him the Hobgoblin equipment. Meanwhile, Spider-Man takes on the "Sinister Five" (consisting of Doctor Octopus, Alistair as the Ultimate Spider-Slayer, Vulture, Rhino, and Oliver as Steel Spider) before they can brainwash him, thereby renaming the group the Sinister Six, and destroy New York City.
25	26	"The Hobgoblin: Part 2"	Sol Choi	Kevin Shinick	February 18, 2018	126	0.22
After having rounded up the rest of the Sinister Five, Spider-Man and Hobgoblin work to find Doctor Octopus. However, after capturing Doctor Octopus when he attacks Horizon High, Spider-Man is suddenly attacked by Hobgoblin. Spider-Man must find a way to stop Hobgoblin who is completely bent on destroying Spider-Man by any means necessary. However, Spider-Man discovers that "Hobgoblin" is actually someone he least suspects and Harry must choose between siding with either his best friend or his father.

=== Season 2 (2018–19) ===
No. overall	No. in season	Title	Directed by	Written by	Original release date	Prod. code	US viewers (millions)
26	1	"How I Thwipped My Summer Vacation"	Dan Duncan	Kevin Burke and Chris "Doc" Wyatt	June 18, 2018	201	0.12
Peter attempts to balance his summer vacation and his responsibilities as Spider-Man when he deals with the respective criminal activities of Black Cat during a trip to the beach, Tinkerer at a baseball game, Hammerhead at a Ross Caliban concert, and an owl-like mutate named Nocturnal at some camping grounds. To top of that, Peter has to get a job at the Daily Bugle so that he can receive payments for providing footage of Spider-Man in action for J. Jonah Jameson. Note: On the Marvel HQ YouTube channel, this episode is available as a series of five shorts, similar to the origin shorts.
27	2	"Take Two"	Sol Choi	Kevin Burke and Chris "Doc" Wyatt	June 18, 2018	202	0.13
After defeating Paladin, Peter is excited to start his second year as a superhero and as a student at Horizon High when it begins its Neuro-Cortex project. He discovers that Doctor Octopus also claims to want a second chance after being released from a high-security prison known as The Cellar. When the Wild Pack (consisting of Silver Sable, Paladin, Puma, and Battlestar) raid Horizon High in search of information on the Neuro-Cortex, Spider-Man must work with Doctor Octopus to reclaim the stolen data.
28	3	"Between an Ock and a Hard Place"	Dan Duncan	Kevin Burke and Chris "Doc" Wyatt	June 25, 2018	203	0.11
While trying to find footage that would get Jameson to talk good about Spider-Man, he discovers there is a female Doctor Octopus who plans to obtain some crystals. When Spider-Man and Miles find Octavius with a police officer, he tells the police officer that the woman in the picture is Carolyn Trainer, who was in the cell next to him back when he was incarcerated at The Cellar. As Spider-Man pursues Trainer, he discovers that she and the Wild Pack had the same boss in someone Spider-Man would least suspect.
29	4	"Rise Above It All"	Sol Choi	Mark Hoffmeier	July 2, 2018	204	N/A
A viral extreme sports stunt group known as the Wake Riders led by Barkley Blitz and promoted by Gabby Flenkman is doing various aerial stunts by dragging Spider-Man into them. After an encounter with Vulture, who claims that the Wake Riders stole his Vulture tech and done secret heists across the globe, Spider-Man discovers that the Wake Riders are working to upgrade it so that Vulture can lead them.
30	5	"School of Hard Knocks"	Dan Duncan	Josh Haber	July 9, 2018	205	0.22
As Jameson praises the Avengers' latest fight with the Frost Giants, Spider-Man comes across a girl who has electrical abilities and traces the 237 number to a room at an elite boarding school called the Bilderberg Academy. Upon encountering Ms. Marvel, who is investigating the disappearances of Captain America, Captain Marvel, and Hulk on Iron Man's behalf, they discover that it is a front for A.I.M. with Scientist Supreme Monica Rappaccini overseeing a superhuman project involving the missing Avengers for the experiments.
31	6	"Dead Man's Party (Part 1)"	Sol Choi	Jacob Semahn	July 16, 2018	206	N/A
After Peter obtains footage of Spider-Man fighting Beetle, Eddie Brock reaches his breaking point regarding his growing jealously, forcing him to betray Jameson. When Eddie attempts to get pictures of the V-252 at the Space Administration, the symbiote merges with him and shares its memories of Spider-Man. With his new host, the V-252 (renamed "Venom")) targets Peter as he and Miles throw a high school party at his house while Aunt May is on vacation.
32	7	"Venom Returns (Part 2)"	Dan Duncan	Kevin Burke and Chris "Doc" Wyatt	July 23, 2018	207	0.18
Peter is two steps behind as Venom (still merged with a revenge-crazed Eddie) kidnaps Jameson, Gwen, Max, Aunt May, and Anya and holds them hostage at Horizon High, demanding a face-off against Spider-Man. As Spider-Man tries to prevent his peers from discovering his secret identity during the fight, Miles works to find a weakness that they have not used on Venom yet. Note: This episode is dedicated in memory of Steve Ditko.
33	8	"Bring on the Bad Guys: Part 1"	Sol Choi	J.M. DeMatteis	July 30, 2018	208	0.16
Despite feeling despondent following his recent firing from the Daily Bugle, Peter works to put together an equipment for the Horizon High Open House. However, Spider-Man has to contain with the heist caused by Hippo and Panda-Mania. When a mysterious villain puts a bounty on Spider-Man, Overdrive is the first to take the opportunity.
34	9	"Bring on the Bad Guys: Part 2"	Dan Duncan	Jacob Semahn	July 30, 2018	209	0.16
With the Horizon High Open House 24 hours away, Spider-Man gets attacked by Spot. Due to the experimental cure she used on herself back in the Spider-Island incident, Anya's Spider Powers resurface, allowing her to adopt the alias Spider-Girl and form a "Spider Team" with Miles and Gwen. Afterwards, Spider-Man is lured into Mysterio's funhouse filled with illusions.
35	10	"Bring on the Bad Guys: Part 3"	Sol Choi	Gavin Hignight	August 6, 2018	210	N/A
With the Horizon High Open House 10 hours away, Spider-Man deals with Jack O'Lantern on the Brooklyn Bridge as he tries to get the info on who put the bounty on him. Afterwards, he helps Prowler save his brother Abraham from Silvermane, who demands payment following a botched job in exchange for Abraham's freedom.
36	11	"Bring on the Bad Guys: Part 4"	Dan Duncan	Jennifer Muro	August 6, 2018	211	0.18
On his way to the Horizon High Open House, Spider-Man runs into Electro, who swipes the power amplifier he got from Prowler and uses it to become a sentient mass of electricity. After the resulting damages cancels the Open House, Spider-Man begins tracking the identity of the mysterious boss that put a price on his head when Police Chief Yuri Watanabe's claim of him robbing a bank leads to an encounter with Chameleon.
37	12	"Brain Drain"	Sol Choi	Jacob Semahn	August 13, 2018	212	0.14
Despite Chameleon being behind bars, Spider-Man is ambushed by Tinkerer who still wants to collect the bounty. Peter and Miles scan a piece of Chameleon's mask with help from the Living Brain, a robot made from the Neuro Cortex technology. As Miles searches for the missing Jackal who holds the patent on holo-metal materials, he follows the signal to a sub-basement of Oscorp to find information on the bounty mastermind's identity.
38	13	"The Living Brain"	Dan Duncan	Kevin Burke and Chris "Doc" Wyatt	August 13, 2018	213	0.16
Now that the Living Brain is the host of Octavius' consciousness, he uses the energy-focal device he made at Oscorp to begin making his enemies suffer. While being held in a Supervillain Holding Facility, Spider-Man must work with Chief Watanabe to defeat Beetle and Electro and get through the facility's security features when the Living Brain threatens to destroy it.
39	14	"The Day Without Spider-Man"	Sol Choi	Danielle Wolff	September 8, 2019	214	N/A
A relic called the Blood Gem, which is said to contain mystical energies, has been delivered to Horizon High after being found at an ancient dig site. While studying the Blood Gem, Gwen tries to contact Peter who has not been answering her calls. However, the relic is stolen by Scorpion on Tinkerer's behalf as part of a plot to enhance Scorpion. Gwen's dormant spider-powers are reawakened by the Blood Gem-powered gun that Tinkerer made. Adopting the alias Ghost-Spider, Gwen works together with Miles and Spider-Girl to take out Scorpion and Tinkerer, who plan to draw Spider-Man out.
40	15	"My Own Worst Enemy"	Dan Duncan	Kevin Burke and Chris "Doc" Wyatt	September 15, 2019	215	N/A
Now that his consciousness is inside Spider-Man's body, Octavius takes on the name of the Superior Spider-Man and initiates the next phase of his plan to bring New York to its knees. His new brain, however, contains Peter's lingering memories of Uncle Ben that push him into being a hero despite himself, inadvertently letting Hammerhead escape. Left with no other choice, Octavius must master Spider-Man's powers if he is to stop a plan of his own devising that is being carried out by his now sprung-out accomplice Silver Sable, who is out to set off explosive A.I.M. caches in Central Park.
41	16	"Critical Update"	Sol Choi	Grant Moran	September 22, 2019	216	N/A
Superior Spider-Man adjusts to his new life as a hero, finding ways to streamline his methods into a more efficient (albeit less warm) approach, leading to the creation of the Spiderbots. He even manages to earn the approval of Jameson when paying him a "visit" at the Daily Bugle. When his methods are challenged by Sandgirl who sets out building her own criminal organization by uniting Hammerhead and Silvermane's disarrayed henchmen, Miles finds out how just far "Spider-Man" is willing to go in the name of justice. Meanwhile, Peter's consciousness works to survive the virus scan and different deletion processes that Max does to the Neuro Cortex to find a way out and be reunited with his body.
42	17	"A Troubled Mind"	Dan Duncan	Jacob Semahn	September 29, 2019	217	N/A
Superior Spider-Man is confronted by Iron Man, Ms. Marvel, and Black Widow who are investigating Miles' suspicions that "Spider-Man" is not who he claims to be after nearly killing Sandgirl. Unfortunately, their investigation turns into a begrudging team-up when they find A.I.M. is using three mental projection devices to create their new leader MODOK. Meanwhile, Peter's consciousness wanders within Horizon High's main computer in search of finding a way to contact Miles on the outside and explores Octavius' memories, discovering that he had issues with his abusive father Torbert and a jock named Steve.
43	18	"Cloak and Dagger"	Sol Choi	Jacob Semahn	October 6, 2019	218	N/A
Octavius (via Peter's body) re-enrolls at Midtown High and meets assistant chemistry teacher Anna Maria Marconi who enlists him in a sponsorship proposal to Alchemax so that it can be equal to Horizon High. When Cloak and Dagger assault Midtown High in an attempt to exact vengeance on Alchemax along with Midtown's benefactor Tiberius Stone, Superior Spider-Man must protect the school and take the duo down. Meanwhile, Miles has finally discovered what happened to both Peter and Spider-Man after a surprise visit from Octavius' discarded tentacles, which are now the host of Peter's consciousness, and must figure out a way to save both of them.
44	19	"Superior (Part 5)"	Dan Duncan and Eric Elrod	Kevin Burke and Chris "Doc" Wyatt	October 13, 2019	219	N/A
As Midtown High is recovering from Superior Spider-Man's fight against Cloak, Dagger, and Tiberius, the Venom symbiote is awakened from stasis due to some experimentation. Now able to function without a host, the symbiote abandons Eddie and assaults Midtown High in search of Peter, intent on making him suffer for rejecting him as his host the previous year. But when he discovers Octavius' body swap, Venom uses Anna Maria as a bargaining chip to force Octavius to reunite Peter's consciousness with his body. Having grown close to Anna Maria, Octavius must choose whether to restore the real Spider-Man to his former self or lose his only friend.
45	20	"Brand New Day"	Sol Choi	Liza Palmer	October 20, 2019	220	N/A
Despite his relationships with Gwen, Anya, and Max being strained thanks to Octavius' body-swap and his departure from Horizon High, Peter begins getting his life back on track following Octavius' sacrifice. When a series of attacks results in Iron Man, Hulk, Captain America, Ms. Marvel, and Black Widow being captured, Spider-Man is left to figure out who could be behind this. However, the villains suspected of being involved with these attacks (consisting of Mister Negative, Spot, Electro, Cloak, Sandgirl, and Molten Man) are locked away in the Cellar. As Spider-Man investigates his claims after they are debunked by Chief Watanabe, he encounters a dangerous new power-copying enemy known as Regent.
46	21	"The Cellar"	Eric Elrod	Shannon Eric Denton	October 27, 2019	221	N/A
Going on the defensive against Regent, Spider-Man meets with Chief Watanabe and reveals new information he discovered during his fight with Regent, learning that Frostbite, Whirlwind, and Paradox are the owners of the abilities replicated by Regent that he has never encountered before. Taking his mission of rescuing the missing Avengers to The Cellar, Spider-Man discovers Regent is none other than the prison's warden and Watanabe's mentor Augustus Roman and has been using the powers of the various inmates to imprison the missing Avengers in another dimension because of how they arrested his father long ago. Meanwhile, Octavius finally recovers from his coma in time for him and Anna Maria to help Spider-Man by freeing Cloak and Dagger as redemption for his past crimes.
47	22	"The Road to Goblin War"	Sol Choi	J. M. DeMatteis	November 3, 2019	222	N/A
Spider-Man is having great trouble in stopping the slick criminal Slyde who always escapes every time he tries to catch him. To rectify this, he accepts Octavius' help in taking down Slyde and discovers a connection between the speedster and Beemont Chemicals Corporation. Assisted by Octavius' Spider-Bots, Spider-Man must stop Slyde from using whatever cutting-edge chemicals he has at his disposal to exact his revenge on both the company and New York itself.
48	23	"Goblin War: Part 1"	Eric Elrod	Gavin Hignight	November 10, 2019	223	N/A
Spider-Man and Doctor Octopus team up with Ghost-Spider and Spider-Girl as they track down a mysterious new threat called the Goblin Nation. Ghost-Spider and Spider-Girl both think Goblin Nation's leader is Peter due to Octavius' actions from when he was Superior Spider-Man. However, Spider-Man thinks it is Alistair Smythe given the likelihood that he could have had access to the Goblin tech on Horizon High's computers from when the tech's original creator Harry was a student. When Harry eventually returns, Spider-Man and company discover that there is more than one Goblin on the loose.
49	24	"Goblin War: Part 2"	Sol Choi	Jacob Semahn	November 17, 2019	224	N/A
As Spider-Man and Hobgoblin seek to find and unmask the Goblin Nation's leader, now identified as the Goblin King, Spider-Man grows concerned that his best friend is leading him into a trap. Hobgoblin, on the other hand, is convinced that the identity of the Goblin King is his possibly still alive father Norman especially since their investigation leads them to a hidden chamber filled with Norman's leftover Goblin technology. Meanwhile, Ghost-Spider and Spider-Girl have a run-in with the Electro Goblins, discovering that different Goblin Thugs are at large.
50	25	"Goblin War: Part 3"	Eric Elrod	Kevin Burke and Chris "Doc" Wyatt	November 24, 2019	225	N/A
To challenge the Goblin Nation attacking New York, Spider-Man must first bring together the rest of the Spider Team. With Doctor Octopus and Anna Maria providing tactical support, Spider-Man and Hobgoblin battle Silvermane's Cyber Goblins while Miles, Ghost-Spider, and Spider-Girl intervene a feud between Electro's Electro Goblins and Crossbones' War Goblins. Meanwhile, the Goblin King leads the Wake Riders in going after an invincible Goblin Mech suit capable of controlling any machinery in its range.
51	26	"Goblin War: Part 4"	Sol Choi	Kevin Burke and Chris "Doc" Wyatt	December 1, 2019	226	N/A
Using the power of the Goblin Mech, the Goblin King gains control over most of the technology in the city, including the Wake Riders' Goblin tech. With most of the Spider Team defeated, only Spider-Man, Hobgoblin, and Doctor Octopus are left to stop him from unleashing a new kind of ruin upon New York, leading to a showdown at Horizon High and Doctor Octopus sacrificing himself to save the city.

=== Season 3: Maximum Venom (2020) ===
Note: Each episode in this season has a 44-minute runtime, twice as long as the previous seasons. However, the Marvel HQ YouTube channel and Disney+ present these episodes as standard 22-minute episodes, thus doubling the season's episode count from 6 to 12. Marvel HQ Youtube channel also published various online shorts to promote the season

No. overall	No. in season	Title	Directed by	Written by	Original release date	Prod. code	US viewers (millions)
52	1	"Web of Venom"	Tim Eldred and Sol Choi	Kevin Burke and Chris "Doc" Wyatt	April 19, 2020	301	N/A
While Gwen, Miles, and Anya are away on a college tour, Peter learns that Max has created a synthetic yet non-sentient copy of Venom and Curt Connors has been hired as the new bio-mechanical professor. While Peter gives new student Grady Scraps a tour of Horizon High, Grady accidentally unleashes a technology-eating monstrosity called the Technovore from Horizon High's project graveyard. Spider-Man has to take an enormous risk by using the synthetic symbiote copy to defeat the rampaging machine before it eats the Arc Reactor donated to the school by Tony Stark. Peter continues testing the synthetic symbiote copy while stopping the Stark Industries train system when it runs out of control upon adapting to the electrical current of the train's Arc Reactor. During the incident, Peter discovers that the symbiote can render itself immune to the original Venom's weaknesses. While working under the orders of his benefactor to expose the "corrupt operations" that Max is doing, Connors accidentally frees the original Venom. Spider-Man must rescue Connors and stop Venom from unleashing an alien weapon of unknown purpose.
53	2	"Amazing Friends"	Tim Eldred and Sol Choi	Merrill Hagan and Denise Downer	May 17, 2020	302	N/A
As the Klyntar make their way to Earth, having responded to the beacon activated by Venom prior to the latter's death, they capture the Avengers and Star-Lord while on a mission in space. Toddler Groot arrives on Earth ahead of the Klyntar to warn Spider-Man. Due to their inexperience with Groot's language, Spider-Man seeks help from Ironheart whereas Miles searches for Doctor Strange. However, things get problematic when Spider-Man and Ironheart must protect Groot from A.I.M. Spider-Man, Ironheart, and the Totally Awesome Hulk must rescue Groot from A.I.M. Island. During the mission, they discover that Monica Rappaccini has teamed up with Baron Mordo and is using Groot as a template to create wooden golems for Mordo. Meanwhile, Miles and Doctor Strange attempt to escape the Unknown Realms after being imprisoned there by Mordo.
54	3	"Vengeance of Venom"	Tim Eldred and Sol Choi	Zach Craley and J. M. DeMatteis	June 21, 2020	303	0.13
Having been "Venomized" by the Klyntar, Captain America, Thor, Iron Man, and Captain Marvel are sent to Earth as an advanced hunting party. The possessed Avengers begin capturing the remaining superheroes on the planet, including Doctor Strange, Groot, Totally Awesome Hulk, and Cloak. Despite the growing danger pushing him to his breaking point, Spider-Man must find a way to stop the Klyntar before they clear the planet for a complete invasion. The Klyntar invasion continues to spread through New York, as Miles, Ghost-Spider, Spider-Girl, Hobgoblin, Ironheart, Dagger, and most of the civilians have been captured. Spider-Man must persuade Marc Spector to come out of retirement as Moon Knight so they can find Max, May, and other survivors amidst the chaos. Upon capturing the Venomized Groot, Spider-Man and Max get to work on creating a more powerful synthetic symbiote that could perhaps thwart the Klyntar's invasion and save everyone.
55	4	"Spider-Man Unmasked"	Tim Eldred and Sol Choi	Jim Martin and Gavin Hignight	August 16, 2020	304	N/A
After having to fight his way past Tinkerer, Spider-Man rushes to deliver a flash drive containing a post-mortem transmission from Octavius that would help to prove Max's innocence to the board of education. Upon seeing the evidence, the head administrator states that they can get testimony from Aleksei Sytsevich to cooperate with Max's helpfulness. Looking for Aleksei while the others stall, Spider-Man finds that he has been transformed into Rhino by Swarm using Jackal's old Rhino formula. Curt Connors blackmails Spider-Man into unmasking himself before the board of education, resulting in Max's firing and Connors becoming the interim headmaster until the end of the term. Knowing that Swarm is turning other people into human/animal hybrids for his gladiatorial-type contest the Underground Monster League, the Spider Team must battle for their lives in front of the criminal underworld. Peter must also find a way to reconcile with Gwen and Anya for keeping his identity as Spider-Man a secret from them.
56	5	"Generations"	Tim Eldred and Sol Choi	Marty Isenberg and Mae Catt	September 27, 2020	305	N/A
With Horizon High under Curt Connors' management, he starts to change the rules to the students' disappointment. When an acid-related incident caused by Grady's experiment reveals a case full of Jackal serum vials, the Spider Team realizes that Jackal has returned following the Spider Island crisis. Spider-Man and Ghost-Spider must track down Jackal's secret lab in an attempt to destroy the villain's latest evil plans. Meanwhile, Miles and Anya grow suspicious of both the high-security teacher's lounge and the presence of Anya's stepsister Maria. The Spider Team discovers that Curt Connors' benefactor is Norman Osborn, who has survived his fight with Spider-Man and Hobgoblin the previous year and has become the Dark Goblin through a combination of Venom's DNA and Jackal's latest serum. The Spider-Team must battle against the Dark Goblin and his minions (consisting of Jackal, Swarm, and Maria as Tarantula). During the four-way fight, Miles and Anya discover that there’s more to their opponents than meets the eye.
57	6	"Maximum Venom"	Tim Eldred and Sol Choi	Kevin Burke and Chris "Doc" Wyatt	October 25, 2020	306	0.09
After helping the Avengers apprehend MODOK, Iron Man offers Spider-Man to join the team. Though Spider-Man requests time to think about it. Peter invites Mary Jane Watson to attend a school dance at Horizon High celebrating Max's rehiring. As the Spider Team tracks down Lizard in Horizon High, they discover that it is actually Venom who has returned from the dead and is seeking revenge on Spider-Man for thwarting his invasion. Following "Maximum Venom" (a Venom-controlled Max) through the Matter Transport Portal to the Klyntar's home planet, Spider-Man must save Max and stop Venom from destroying Earth with a dragon-like weapon called the World-Killer. Meanwhile, the rest of the Spider Team, along with Mary Jane and Grady, must prevent Venom's ancient siblings, the Symbiote Sisters (consisting of Scream, Scorn, and Mania) from using Venom's seed to further their grand scheme of Earth's destruction.
