= The Living Brain =

The Living Brain can refer to

- Living Brain, fictional character
- The Living Brain (Spiderman episode)
- The Living Brain, several books by William Grey Walter, see William Grey Walter#Books and articles
