= Spider-Man (2017 TV series) =

American superhero animated series

- Also known as: Marvel's Spider-Man: Maximum Venom (season 3)
- Genre: Superhero; Comedy drama; Science fiction
- Based on: Spider-Man by: Stan Lee; Steve Ditko
- Developed by: Kevin Shinick
- Directed by: Dan Duncan; Philip Pignotti; Sol Choi; Tim Eldred; Eric Elrod
- Creative director: Philip Pignotti
- Voices of: Robbie Daymond; Laura Bailey; Nadji Jeter; Bob Joles; Josh Keaton; Nancy Linari; Scott Menville; Melanie Minichino; Max Mittelman; Ben Pronsky; Fred Tatasciore
- Theme music composer: Kevin Manthei
- Composer: Kevin Manthei
- Country of origin: United States
- Original language: English
- No. of seasons: 3
- No. of episodes: 58 (list of episodes)

Production
- Executive producers: Alan Fine; Dan Buckley; Joe Quesada; Jeph Loeb (season 1); Cort Lane; Eric Radomski; Marsha Griffin (season 3)
- Running time: 21 minutes (seasons 1–2); 44 minutes (season 3)
- Production company: Marvel Animation

Original release
- Network: Disney XD
- Release: August 19, 2017 – October 25, 2020

Related
- Ultimate Spider-Man; Spidey and His Amazing Friends; Your Friendly Neighborhood Spider-Man; Guardians of the Galaxy; Hulk and the Agents of S.M.A.S.H.; Avengers Assemble

Marvel's Spider-Man is an American animated television series, based on the Marvel Comics character of the same name. A replacement for the previous series Ultimate Spider-Man, the first season premiered on August 19, 2017, on Disney XD. The show was subtitled Maximum Venom for its third season, which premiered on April 19, 2020.

== Plot ==
=== Season 1 ===
Gifted teenager Peter Parker is given superpowers when he is bitten by a radioactive spider during a school field trip to Oscorp Industries. After the death of his Uncle Ben by a burglar that he hesitated to stop at a wrestling arena, Peter comes to his own terms of being the superhero Spider-Man. Sometime later, Peter begins learning how to balance his crime-fighting career with his new enrollment at Horizon High, a school for students with genius-level intellect run by Max Modell. Joining Peter in his ordeals against Norman Osborn, Jackal, and numerous other villains are his classmates Gwen Stacy, Miles Morales (who develops powers similar to Peter's and becomes the Ultimate Spider-Man), and Anya Corazon, as well as his best friend Harry Osborn (who eventually becomes the superhero Hobgoblin).

Besides Norman and Jackal, other villains introduced this season include Doctor Octopus, Vulture, Venom, Rhino, Spencer and Alistair Smythe, Kraven the Hunter, Black Cat, A.I.M., Curt Connors, Sandgirl, Scorpion, and Crossbones. Other characters introduced in this season include May Parker, Flash Thompson, Liz Allan, Randy Robertson, Robbie Robertson, Iron Man, Hulk, Black Widow, and Sandman.

=== Season 2 ===
Taking place a few months after the previous season, Otto Octavius possesses Spider-Man's body and becomes the Superior Spider-Man. Peter's consciousness transfers into Otto's tentacle harness and convinces him to reverse the swap. Towards the end of the season, Spider-Man and company discover the existence of a cult-like organization led by Adrian Toomes as the Goblin King.

During this season, Peter gains a career at the Daily Bugle, Anya becomes Spider-Girl after gaining superpowers from the "Spider-Island" incident, Gwen becomes Ghost-Spider after gaining superpowers from the Blood Gem, and Spider-Man forms a "Spider Team" with his inner circle.

This season introduces more villains, including Chameleon, Electro, Silvermane, Regent, Beetle, Silver Sable, Tinkerer, Monica Rappaccini, MODOK, Slyde, Eddie Brock, and the Wake Riders. Other characters introduced in this season include Anna Maria Marconi, Cloak and Dagger, Ms. Marvel, Yuri Watanabe, Prowler, Abraham Brown, Captain America, J. Jonah Jameson, Grady Scraps, Captain Marvel, and original character Nocturnal.

=== Season 3 (Maximum Venom) ===
Taking place two weeks after the previous season, Spider-Man uncovers two separate plots centered on Venom. The most prominent is helping Max Modell save the Earth from an invasion of Klyntar summoned by Venom. The secondary plot is a conspiracy helmed by Curt Connors to frame Modell for Venom's actions. Backed up by Hobgoblin, the Spider Team exposes Norman's conspiracy, resulting in Modell regaining his job. During the battle with the Klyntar, Horizon High is destroyed, with the Spiders planning to build a tech laboratory called the Worldwide Engineering Brigade to replace it.

Besides Dark Goblin, other villains introduced in this season include Scream, Scorn, Mania, Swarm (Jefferson Davis), Tarantula, Baron Mordo, and the Klyntar dragon Grendel. Other characters introduced in this season include Ironheart, the Totally Awesome Hulk, Doctor Strange, Star-Lord, Groot, Moon Knight, Anti-Venom, and Thor.

== Episodes ==
Season	Episodes	Originally released	
Season	Episodes	First released	Last released
Origin Shorts	6	July 24, 2017	July 29, 2017
1	26	August 19, 2017	February 18, 2018
2	26	June 18, 2018	December 1, 2019
3	6	April 19, 2020	October 25, 2020

=== Crossovers ===
The series' incarnation of Spider-Man makes guest appearances in Guardians of the Galaxy and the fifth season of Avengers Assemble, which are set in the same continuity. Max Modell and Venom also appear in the former series, while Kraven the Hunter and Vulture appear in the latter.

== Voice cast ==
=== Main cast ===
- Robbie Daymond – Peter Parker/Spider-Man, Superior Spider-Man
- Nadji Jeter – Miles Morales/Ultimate Spider-Man/Spy-D
- Laura Bailey – Gwen Stacy/Spider-Gwen/Ghost-Spider, Black Widow, Crimson Dynamo
- Melanie Minichino – Anya Corazon/Spider-Girl
- Max Mittelman – Harry Osborn/Hobgoblin
- Scott Menville –Otto Octavius/Doctor Octopus/Living Brain, Grady Scraps
- Fred Tatasciore – Max Modell, Hulk, Crossbones, Beetle

=== Guest cast ===
- Aaron Abrams – Tinkerer
- Charlie Adler – MODOK, Torbert Octavius
- Valenzia Algarin – Maria Corazon, Tarantula
- Connor Andrade – Groot/Anti-Venom
- Troy Baker – Kraven the Hunter
- Ogie Banks – Barkley Blitz, Abraham Brown
- Eric Bauza – Mister Negative
- Gregg Berger – Absorbing Man
- Ryan Blaney – Overdrive
- Cameron Boyce – Herman Schultz
- Jonathan Brooks – Tiberius Stone
- Yvette Nicole Brown - Head Administrator
- Sofia Carson – Sandgirl
- Jim Cummings – Hammerhead, Ghost
- Felicia Day – Mary Jane Watson
- Alex Désert – Jefferson Davis/Swarm
- Trevor Devall – Blizzard, Paladin
- John DiMaggio – Raymond Warren/Jackal
- Benjamin Diskin – Flash Thompson, Spencer Smythe, Venom (season 1), Burglar
- Alistair Duncan – Adrian Toomes/Vulture/Goblin King
- Meg Donnelly – Scream
- Teala Dunn – Panda-Mania
- Chris Edgerly – Alan Beemont
- Crispin Freeman – Mysterio, Spot
- Will Friedle – Star-Lord
- Peter Giles – Moon Knight
- Grey Griffin – Black Cat, Monica Rappaccini, Captain Marvel
- Mark Hamill – Arnim Zola
- Olivia Holt – Dagger
- Ernie Hudson – Robbie Robertson
- Carla Jeffery – Mania
- Bob Joles – J. Jonah Jameson
- Aubrey Joseph – Cloak
- Josh Keaton – Norman Osborn/Dark Goblin/Spider-King, John Jameson/Man-Wolf, Steel Spider
- Kathreen Khavari – Ms. Marvel, Shannon Stillwell
- Katrina Kemp – Anna Maria Marconi
- Phil LaMarr – Slyde, Sal Salerno (season 2)
- Natalie Lander – Liz Allan/Screwball
- Ki Hong Lee – Totally Awesome Hulk
- Daisy Lightfoot – Electro
- Nancy Linari – Aunt May Parker
- Eric Lopez – Joseph Rockwell
- Yuri Lowenthal – Curt Connors/Lizard, Clayton Cole, Nocturnal
- Matthew Mercer – Aleksei Sytsevich/Rhino
- Sumalee Montano – Yuri Watanabe
- Nolan North – Silvermane
- Liam O'Brien – Doctor Strange
- Patton Oswalt – Uncle Ben Parker, Chameleon
- Nathaniel J. Potvin – Prowler
- Ben Pronsky – Venom (seasons 2 and 3), Eddie Brock
- Joe Quesada – Joe Q.
- Leonard Roberts – Baron Mordo
- Zeno Robinson – Randy Robertson
- Kylee Russell – Scorn
- Sean Schemmel – Sal Salerno (season 1)
- Jeremy Shada – Ross Caliban
- Zack Shada – Hippo
- Kevin Shinick – Bruce Banner
- Roger Craig Smith – Captain America
- Jason Spisak – Alistair Smythe, Scorpion
- April Stewart – Silver Sable
- Booboo Stewart – Jack O'Lantern
- Kari Wahlgren – Lady Octopus
- Audrey Wasilewski – Gabby Flenkman
- Imari Williams – Regent, Molten Man
- Travis Willingham – Sandman, Thor
- Mick Wingert – Iron Man
- Sofia Wylie – Ironheart

== Production ==
=== Development ===
In October 2016, the series was announced by Cort Lane, senior vice president of Marvel Animation, as a replacement for the series' predecessor, Ultimate Spider-Man, which ended in early January 2017. Spider-Man premiered on August 19, 2017, on Disney XD.

The show was renewed for a second season, which premiered on June 18, 2018. The show was subtitled Maximum Venom for its third season. Production on Maximum Venom started in February 2019 and ended in October 2019.

=== Crew ===
- Shaun O'Neil – Character designer
- Amanda Goodbread – Casting director, recording manager
- Philip Pignotti – Supervising director
- Kevin Shinick – Story editor
- Collette Sunderman – Voice director
- Kris Zimmerman-Salter – Voice director

== Broadcast ==
The show premiered on August 19, 2017, on Disney XD in the United States. It premiered on August 28 on Disney XD in India, and had a simulcast premiere October 14 on Disney Channel and Disney XD in Southeast Asia.

The second season premiered June 18, 2018 in the United States, and concluded on December 1, 2019. The third season premiered on April 19, 2020, and concluded on October 25, 2020.

== Reception ==
Dave Trumbore of Collider reviewed the series premiere, and praised the series for basing the story around Peter Parker's scientific genius, saying "it pays off in fantastic ways". Trumbore was positive about the animation saying he liked the new look, and also how "strong the writing and performances are".
