= Nancy Linari =

American actress

- Occupation: Actress
- Years active: 1983–present

Nancy Linari is an American voice, film and television actress. She has had recurring roles on Duckman, W.I.T.C.H., The Real Adventures of Jonny Quest, and has guest starred on a number of other TV shows like Two and a Half Men. Linari also provided the voice of Morticia Addams on The Addams Family and May Parker in Spider-Man (2017), reprising the role of May in the 2018 video game of the same name.

== Filmography ==
=== Live-action roles ===
Year	Title	Role	Notes	Source
1983	Remington Steele	Dr. Sheila Marcus	Episode: "A Good Night's Steele"	
1983	Uncommon Valor	Reporter		
1985	Street Hawk	Reporter #1	Episode: "The Unsinkable 453"	
1985	Airwolf	Receptionist	Episode: "Natural Born"	
1985	Simon & Simon	Elaine Phoenix	Episode: "Burden of the Beast"	
1985	Riptide	Aldia	Episode: "Who Really Watches the Sunset"	
1988	ALF	Mary	Episode: "Movin' Out"	
1989	Dear John	Dr. Osborne	Episode: "Friends and Lovers"	
1989	Freddy's Nightmares	Mrs. Franklin	Episode: "Missing Persons"	
1990	Generations	Kathleen	2 episodes	
1990	After the Shock	Young Mother	Television film	
1991	Homefront	Miss Grogan	Episode: "Man, This Joint Is Jumping"	
1991	Matlock	Doreen	Episode: "The Game Show"	
1992	Major Dad	Flower	Episode: "Old Acquaintance"	
1992-1994	Sisters	Gail Dannauer, Belinda	2 episodes	
1993	Dudley	Lydia	Episode: "Call Me Irresponsible"	
1993-1994	Days of Our Lives	Nurse Sarnoff	6 episodes	
1994	Weird Science	Ms. Marrone	Episode: "Party High, U.S.A."	
1994	The Nanny	Mrs. Livingston	Episode: "Curse of the Grandmas"	
1996	Step by Step	Saleslady	Episode: "Secret Admirer"	
1996	Home Improvement	Clarisse	Episode: "Workshop 'Til You Drop"	
1996	ER	Elizabeth Puro	Episode: "Let the Games Begin"	
1997	Looking for Lola	Selma Hinson	Television film	
1997	Frasier	Elaine Hensley	Episode: "To Kill a Talking Bird"	
1998	Beyond Belief: Fact or Fiction		2 episodes	
1998	7th Heaven	Dr. Lisa Landsberg	Episode: "It Takes Two, Baby"	
1999	Sabrina the Teenage Witch	Mother Nature	Episode: "Sabrina, Nipping at Your Nose"	
2000-2004	NYPD Blue	Kathleen Gallagher, Allie Reese	2 episodes	
2001	Dharma & Greg	Woman	Episode: "Kitty Dearest"	
2004	LAX	Flight Attendant Gayle	Episode: "The Longest Morning"	
2005	The West Wing	Convention Speaker #3	Episode: "Things Fall Apart"	
2005	Eyes	The Prosecutor	Episode: "Whereabouts"	
2005	The O.C.	Landlord	Episode: "The Game Plan"	
2006	Grey's Anatomy	Sophie's Daughter	Episode: "Tell Me Sweet Little Lies"	
2007	What About Brian	Nanny #3	Episode: "What About Marjorie"	
2007-2008	General Hospital	Judge Arroyo	9 episodes	
2009	Desperate Housewives	Evelyn	Episode: "Marry Me a Little"	
2010	The Social Network	Lawrence Summers		
2010	Fringe	Eliza Staller	Episode: "The Bishop Revival"	
2010	Brothers & Sisters	Older Woman #1	Episode: "An Ideal Husband"	
2012	Modern Family	Patti Larkin	Episode: "Send Out the Clowns"	
2012	Bones	Harriet Grover	Episode: "The Past in the Present"	
2013	Criminal Minds	Mary Donovan	Episode: "Zugzwang"	
2016	Life in Pieces	Margaret	Episode: "Bite Flight Wing-Man"	
2016	Gilmore Girls: A Year in the Life	Martha	2 episodes	
2016	This Is Us	Mrs. Sandburg	Episode: "Last Christmas"	
2018	Bosch	Liz Fleischer	2 episodes	
2019	Mad About You	Louise Ganzenmuller	Episode: "The Will to Live"	

=== Animation roles ===
Year	Title	Role	Notes	Source
1987	Pound Puppies	Additional voices	Episode: "The Invisible Friend / Kid in the Doghouse"	
1991	Darkwing Duck	Shyster	Episode: "Jurassic Jumble"	
1991	Yo Yogi!	Additional voices		
1992	The Greatest Adventure: Stories from the Bible	Harem	Episode: "Jonah"	
1992–1993	The Addams Family	Morticia Addams	Main role	
1993	Animaniacs	Cat Ballue, Mother Plotz	2 episodes	
1994	Sonic the Hedgehog	Additional voices	13 episodes	
1994-1997	Duckman	Merv's Secretary	4 episodes	
1995-1997	The Twisted Tales of Felix the Cat	Additional voices	3 episodes, uncredited	
1996	Captain Planet and the Planeteers	Butterfly	Episode: "Twelve Angry Animals"	
1996	Aaahh!!! Real Monsters	Model, Announcer #8	Episode: "Amulet of Enfarg / Bad Hair Day"	
1996	Mortal Kombat: Defenders of the Realm	Zara	Episode: "Swords of Ilkan"	
1996-1997	The Real Adventures of Jonny Quest	Additional voices	5 episodes	
1996-1998	Adventures from the Book of Virtues	Additional voices	3 episodes	
1997	What a Cartoon!	Native Woman, Sultry Woman	Episode: "Awfully Lucky"	
1997	The Angry Beavers	Excited Furrier	Episode: "I Dare You"	
2002	As Told by Ginger	Sobbing Patient	Episode: "Family Therapy"	
2004	Ozzy & Drix	Vitamin E	Episode: "Supplements"	
2006	Ben 10	Various voices	2 episodes	
2006	W.I.T.C.H.	Elizabeth Hale	Episode: "W Is for Witch"	
2014	Transformers: Rescue Bots	Carin	Episode: "Buddy System"	
2016	Steven Universe	Martha Barriga	Episode: "The New Lars"	
2017–2020	Spider-Man	Aunt May, additional voices	Recurring role; 20 episdoes	
2021	Love, Death & Robots	Jeanette	Episode: "Automated Customer Service"	

=== Anime roles ===
Year	Title	Voice role	Notes	Source
2021	Super Crooks	Lady Liberty, Praetorian's Maid		
2024	Pokémon Horizons: The Series	Diana		
2024	My Oni Girl	Gozen	Feature film	

=== Video game roles ===
Year	Title	Voice role	Notes	Source
1996	Tonka Construction	Rose Montana		
1999	Tonka Construction 2	Rose Montana		
2001	Metal Gear Solid 2: Sons of Liberty	Computer		
2002	Star Trek: Starfleet Command III	Admiral Arai		
2004	Onimusha Blade Warriors	Jujudormah		
2004	X-Men Legends	Marrow		
2006	Marvel: Ultimate Alliance	Medusa		
2010	White Knight Chronicles	Additional voices		
2010	Monkey Island 2 Special Edition: LeChuck's Revenge	Librarian		
2011	Star Wars: The Old Republic	Additional voices		
2014	The Elder Scrolls Online	Additional voices		
2018	Spider-Man	Aunt May		
2020	The Last of Us: Part II	Additional voices		
2021	Legends of Runeterra	The Lady of Blood		
2023	Spider-Man 2	Aunt May		
2025	Date Everything!	Stella		
