= The Addams Family (1992 TV series) =

1992 animated series

- Genre: Comedy horror
- Based on: Characters by Charles Addams
- Directed by: Robert Alvarez (season 1); Don Lusk (season 1); Carl Urbano (season 1); Emory Ron Myrick (season 2)
- Voices of: Pamela Adlon; John Astin; Dick Beals; Carol Channing; Jim Cummings; Debi Derryberry; Jeannie Elias; Héctor Elizondo; Pat Fraley; Ernest Harada; Nancy Linari; Edie McClurg; Rob Paulsen; Susan Silo; Rip Taylor; Marcia Wallace
- Theme music composer: Vic Mizzy
- Opening theme: "The Addams Family"
- Ending theme: "The Addams Family" (Instrumental)
- Composers: Guy Moon (season 1; additional music, season 2); Matt Muhoberac (season 2); John Zucker (season 2)
- Country of origin: United States
- Original language: English
- No. of seasons: 2
- No. of episodes: 21

Production
- Executive producers: David Kirschner; Mark Young (Season 1 only)
- Producers: Ron Myrick; Emory Ron Myrick (Season 2)
- Editors: Gil Iverson; Tom Gleason; Tim Iverson
- Running time: 23 minutes approx.
- Production company: Hanna-Barbera; (Note: Animation outsourced to Fil-Cartoons.)

Original release
- Network: ABC
- Release: September 12, 1992 – November 6, 1993

Related
- The Addams Family (1973); The Addams Family (1964–66); The Addams Family (1991)

The Addams Family is an American animated horror comedy television series produced by Hanna-Barbera and based on the eponymous comic strip characters by Charles Addams. It is the second cartoon show to feature the characters (the first was the 1973 series, also produced by Hanna-Barbera), and ran from September 12, 1992, to November 6, 1993, on ABC. The series' development began in the wake of the successful 1991 Addams Family feature film. Two seasons were produced. It remained part of ABC's Saturday Morning lineup until it was replaced by Fudge in January 1995.

== Premise ==
The series focuses on the Addams Family at their ancestral home in the fictional town of Happydale Heights. Much of the plot lines focus on mostly the family dealing with an issue concerning their lives, which they seek to resolve. In some stories, the Addams find themselves dealing with the Normanmeyer family who seek to exploit their situation or thwart their schemes in order to be rid of them from the town; the exception being the family's only son, who is friends with the Addams children. Most episodes focus on a single story, concluding with the Addams celebrating their success with a family dance.

As with the 1973 series, the macabre nature of the Addams family was toned down in order to be acceptable for children. An example of this is Gomez's love of cigars not being shown, along with his response to his wife's use of foreign languages being reduced to a mere kissing frenzy. In addition, writers also ensured that the plots for episodes followed a similar nature to those written for other Saturday morning cartoons of the period.

== Characters ==
The Addams Family

=== Addams Family ===
- Gomez Addams (voiced by John Astin, reprising his role from the 1960s TV series) – The patriarch of the family and the younger brother of Fester. He is a caring and enthusiastic father and is deeply in love with his wife, Morticia. As a running gag, he becomes excited and romantic whenever she (or he himself) speaks in a foreign language or mentions violence or misery. He usually spends his time with unusual activities in the home, mostly accompanied by Fester. Unlike in the other versions, Gomez is usually seen wearing a pink suit. This was Astin's final performance as Gomez in the Addams Family franchise as he retired from the role in 1993.
- Morticia Frump-Addams (voiced by Nancy Linari) – The matriarch of the family. Like her husband, she is very much involved with the raising of her children, and returns the amorous attention she receives from her husband. Her hobbies include art and taking care of the plants. She can be described as a vamp and is commonly seen wearing black gothic dresses. Gomez's nickname for Morticia is Tish. Morticia's catch phrase is, "Oh, Gomez".
- Wednesday Addams (voiced by Debi Derryberry) – The intelligent daughter of Gomez and Morticia and the younger sister of Pugsley. She has low enthusiasm for most activities, and enjoys torturing her brother with dangerous objects, though in a friendly atmosphere. Unlike in other versions, she is the taller of the children. Wednesday wears pigtails and a blue dress, and often carries her headless doll Marie (which she considers one of her best friends). In "Happyester Fester", Marie's name mistakenly is given as Juliet. In "Dead and Breakfast", Wednesday does not like to be grabbed by the pigtails which leads to her beating up the person who did it offscreen.
- Pugsley Addams (voiced by Jeannie Elias) – The son of Gomez and Morticia, and older brother of Wednesday. He is an overweight boy with blond hair, and slightly dim-witted. He has a close bond with his sister, but shows it by terrorizing her (as she also does to him). Pugsley usually wears a yellow shirt with green stripes.
- Uncle Fester (voiced by Rip Taylor) – Gomez's bald older brother with white skin who takes a special interest in blowing himself up. He commonly joins the children with their unusual plans, taking it to the limit, and also spends a lot of his time inventing and creating formulas in the basement lab. Uncle Fester also has a superhero counterpart called Festerman who is the protector of Happy Dale Heights in the Festerman comics that Uncle Fester writes. Uncle Fester's catch phrase is "Oh darn." A running gag throughout the series is Uncle Fester not believing that Granny has psychic powers. Uncle Fester is allergic to whip cream.
- Granny Frump (voiced by Carol Channing) – Mother of Mortitia, mother-in-law of Gomez's, and grandmother of Wednesday and Pugsley. Granny is a witch with psychic powers, expressed through a crystal ball, which she uses for her own fortune-telling "psychic hotline" business. Granny is always trying to find a boyfriend, but never succeeds. She does not get along well with Fester.
- Lurch (voiced by Jim Cummings) – The blue-skinned butler of the Addams family. He is very tall and strong, which intimidates most guests, although he is in fact sweet. He almost never talks, and usually responds by mumbling in a deep voice. His catchphrase is "No comment", uttered when witnessing or becoming part of the antics of the rest of the family. Lurch is one of Wednesday's best friends.
- Thing – A pet of the Addamses, Thing takes the form of a disembodied hand. It constantly helps out the family by reaching them objects, and although it lives in a box, can pop up everywhere in the house. Unlike in other versions, Thing has the ability to fly in this series.
- Cousin Itt (vocal effects provided by Pat Fraley) – A cousin of Gomez and Fester; has a body fully covered by hair, and speaks only in gibberish in a high-pitched voice (though other characters can somehow understand it). Although credited in the main cast, Itt is not seen in all episodes, much like in the original live-action series. Cousin Itt is apparently a government agent. Itt and Fester are close.
- Snappy – A shy alligator that lives with the Addams Family.

==== Relatives ====
Although some of the relatives of the Addams Family are only mentioned, just like in the classic TV series, some of them made appearances in the show:

- Aunt Noggin - A two-headed woman with one head being African and the other head being Caucasian. They are the family's friendly aunts. They wear an old Victorian dress.
- Uncle Cleaver (voiced by Rob Paulsen) - A relative characterized by constant nervous behavior. He has red hair and wears a long brown raincoat in which he hides knives.
- Uncle Frankus - A giant with features of a boar, Frankus is one of the several members of the family who is not human. Intimidating due to his height and temper, he does not speak very often.

=== Normanmeyers ===
- Norman Normanmeyer (voiced by Rob Paulsen in a loose impersonation of Paul Lynde) - The Addams' neighbor. The opposite of the Addams' in almost every way, he is often outraged by their unusual activities and tries to sabotage most of their plans. Despite his contempt of the Addams family, Norman's obsession with underwear (he has his home festooned with underwear) ironically makes him just as abnormal as the Addams clan. Normanmeyer wears a blue suit, has a bit of a pot belly, and is the CEO of an underwear company called "Normanwear". Uncle Fester is fond of Norman and thinks that he's his best friend. Uncle Fester's nickname for Norman is "Norm". Norman is also on the Happydale Heights City Council. In "Festerman," it is shown that Normanmeyer has a superhero counterpart named Underman in the Festerman comics.
- Normina Normanmeyer (voiced by Edie McClurg) - Mr. Normanmeyer's traditional wife. Like her husband, she often tries to sabotage the Addams Family and Morticia in particular. Normina thinks that the Addams are dangerous. Normina is overprotective of N.J. She is most known doing her "Eek" scream. Both she and Norman call each other by revoltingly sweet pet names.
- Norman "N.J." Normanmeyer Jr. (voiced by Dick Beals) - The pre-teen son of the Normanmeyers. Unlike his parents, he likes the Addams and is able to look through their odd behavior. When not spending time with Wednesday and Pugsley, he often attempts to convince his parents to leave the Addams Family alone. Normina's nickname for N.J. is "Little Normie".

=== Other characters ===
- Spy Twins (voiced by Jim Cummings) – Identical twin criminals who have set their eyes on the Addams fortune and are common enemies of Cousin Itt. They are tall and skinny, and usually wear long coats with matching hats. The Spy Twins are trademarked by the habit of finishing each other's sentences. The brothers' plots usually go horribly awry with them getting hurt. One twin has red hair and the other one has brown hair. Fans of the show believe their names are Choke and Dagger based on the title of the episode in which they first appeared.
- Underwear Hitman "Fingers" (voiced by Jim Cummings) – A spy for RumpCo and an underwear hitman. He is large, bald and very intimidating, though somewhat dimwitted.
- RumpCo CEO "H.Q." (voiced by Jim Cummings) – The owner of RumpCo. RumpCo had a lot of success with their prize in every pair gig. The prizes in their underwear were shoes.
- Mr. Limp (voiced by Ernest Harada) – A health inspector and a friend of Mr. Normanmeyer. He is seduced by Grannny.
- Mrs. Quaint (voiced by Susan Silo) – A red-haired guest at the Addams residence, she turns out to be a criminal who is sought in eight states for hotel burglary. She tries to steal the family treasures only to be stopped by the Addams Family and arrested by the authorities.
- Lurch's Girlfriend – The female equivalent to Lurch. Like her boyfriend, she is very tall and big, thus intimidating. She is pink-skinned and has dark hair.
- Harry Palmer (voiced by Jim Cummings impersonating William Shatner) – A movie star whose right hand Finger Fellow lost an audition against Thing. Since then, Harry Palmer has developed a grudge on Thing and tries to get rid of him, which always goes awry.
- Principal Macnamara – The African American principal of Happydale Heights Elementary School, the school that Wednesday, Pugsley, and N.J. attend. Principal Macnamara is good friends with N.J.'s parents.
- Shella – A foreign classmate of Wednesday and Pugsley who is, due to her sweet character, a beloved person in school. Pugsley falls for her, but she soon reveals that she has to return to her homeland.
- Mortimer (voiced by Pamela Adlon) – The overweight red-haired school bully who often takes Pugsley as one of his victims.
- Mrs. Blossom (voiced by Marcia Wallace) – The teacher of Wednesday, Pugsley and N.J.
- Ian Thundermane (voiced by Héctor Elizondo) – A criminal with metal hair who is one of Cousin Itt's enemies.

== Production ==
New artistic models of the characters were used for this series, though still having a passing resemblance to the original comics. Lurch, for instance, has blue skin in the animated series. The Addams Family Theme, re-recorded with a basso profondo lead vocal, was reused as the theme for the series.

== Episodes ==
=== Season 1 (1992) ===
| No. overall | No. in season | Title | Written by | Original release date |
|---|---|---|---|---|
| 1 | 1 | "Happyester Fester" | Bill Matheny & Lane Raichert | September 12, 1992 |
Uncle Fester creates a new fabric called Happyester, so he and Gomez decide to present it to Norman Normanmeyer, who runs Normanwear. Normanmeyer is enthusiastic to buy the formula and offers Uncle Fester to be his partner, but Uncle Fester makes unusual demands before he signs the contract. Meanwhile, a rival underwear company RumpCo has sent a spy, Underwear Hitman "Fingers", to steal the formula. After Wednesday and Pugsley save the day, Uncle Fester is happy to sign the contract. To Uncle Fester, Wednesday, Pugsley, and Thing's surprise, they are thrown out of Normanwear. Nevertheless, Uncle Fester misinterprets the action as a friendly deed. Later, it turns out Happyester has itchy side effects, something that delights the Addams, but causes bad publicity for Normanwear causing Uncle Fester to support Normanmeyer.
| 2 | 2 | "Dead and Breakfast" | Bill Matheny & Lane Raichert | September 19, 1992 |
Wednesday and Pugsley's bad mood over the sunny weather is worsened when they are assigned a school project called 'creative problem solving through junior career exploration'. Through the enthusiasm of Gomez, it is decided that they turn the Addams home into a "dead and breakfast". Wednesday and Pugsley are reluctant to start the project, but do not want to let down their parents. After the hotel's opening, the trouble starts. Not only are the Normanmeyers determined to ruin their business, the Addams receive a visit from a health inspector Mr. Limp, who is courted by Granny, and they also have a guest, Mrs. Quaint, that sets her eyes on the family fortune. Wednesday and Pugsley eventually use booby traps to capture Mrs. Quaint thereby solving a problem creatively. Mrs. Quaint is arrested by the police and Normanmeyer is displeased that Mr. Limp was romanced by Granny.
| 3 | 3 | "The Day Gomez Failed" | Story by : David Schwartz, Bill Matheny, & Lane Raichert; Teleplay by : David Schwartz | September 26, 1992 |
Feeling that he has done everything once, Gomez goes through his days uninspired. Morticia reminds him that everything in his life has been a success, and encourages him to fail at something. The plan backfires, though, because everything Gomez does results in a profit, earning a fortune in only six hours. Mr. Normanmeyer offers Gomez his ticket to failure, announcing his plans on using his land to complete a new freeway. Some time after signing the contract, the family is surprised to find out that part of the contract was demolishing the mansion with bulldozers. Although Gomez sees it as a friendly deed of Normanmeyer, he stops him, revealing that the house is built on a swamp and could therefore not be used for a freeway. Instead, the freeway is built on the Normanmeyer's land, much to their frustration. Meanwhile, Morticia reminds Gomez that he has failed in failing, and therefore succeeded in his plans.
| 4a | 4a | "Girlfriendstein" | Story by : Earl Kress, Bill Matheny, & Lane Raichert; Teleplay by : Earl Kress | October 3, 1992 |
The family notices that Lurch has been somewhere else with his attention lately. Wednesday, Pugsley and Thing dig through his room and find out he has recently been dumped by his girlfriend. Fester building him a new girlfriend seems the perfect resolution. Lurch shows no interest in the robot, though, so Wednesday calls his ex-girlfriend to reunite with him. Meanwhile, Cousin Itt has fallen in love with the robot and they run off. Family mentioned: Aunt Ben (Gomez suggested hooking up Lurch with her while Morticia thought that Aunt Ben was a male).
| 4b | 4b | "Pugsley by the Numbers" | Story by : David Schwartz and Bill Matheny; Teleplay by : David Schwartz | October 3, 1992 |
Wednesday is fed up with her brother continuously ruining her paintings that Lurch is posing for. She decides to create an improved Pugsley with her mother's living paint, but every creation she makes ranging from an intelligent Pugsley, a stronger Pugsley, and a female Pugsley prove to be too annoying. With the help of the real Pugsley, she exterminates the alternative Pugsleys and admits that her brother is perfect.
| 4c | 4c | "Beware of Thing" | Bill Matheny | October 3, 1992 |
The Spy Twins take a break from spying and try to break into the Addams safe which is guarded by Thing. They dress up as a giant hand to seduce and distract Thing, and thereby catch him. Thing is able to escape and eventually scares away The Spy Twins.
| 5 | 5 | "N.J. Addams" | Story by : David Schwartz, Bill Matheny, & Lane Raichert; Teleplay by : David Schwartz | October 10, 1992 |
N.J. feels embarrassed by his parents' weekly speeches at school about underwear and gets scolded by his father for accidentally ruining an Egyptian underwear made from mummy wrappings. He is too afraid to admit that he does not want to take over his father's business one day. Instead of confronting his parents, he runs away from home. After explaining the Addams residence is the one place where he can be himself, Wednesday and Pugsley allow him to stay in a spare room. They make him look unrecognizable and introduce him as Mumbles Addams, a long lost cousin, at the Addams Family reunion organized by Gomez and Morticia. With N.J. missing, Norman and Normina arrange a search party to find their son. N.J. is initially delighted with the attention he is receiving, but soon finds out the relatives like Aunt Noggin and Uncle Cleaver are too odd for his taste when they fight over whose side of the family Mumbles is from. During a burst out, he upsets Uncle Frankus, an intimidating relative who soon starts chasing them after N.J. stated that he didn't want to sit near Uncle Frankus' mother. After he is saved by Wednesday and Pugsley and that Uncle Frankus just wanted him to apologize to his mother, N.J. is informed that it is all right to be different or not live up to people's expectations. N.J. has the courage to return home and his parents announce that they will be less hard on him in the future. Family mentioned: Uncle Fudgy (who wrote a letter back to Gomez stating that he couldn't attend the Addams Family reunion this year), Uncle Goner (who crashed his blimp into an open air poetry reading 10 years ago), Aunt Ben (Pugsley scraped off algae off the rafters for Lurch's dip which she likes), Uncle Guzzle (an unseen relative who was reported to be drinking off the floor), Aunt Goomba (an unseen relative who Granny had N.J. kiss alongside the other relatives), Uncle Flossie (Aunt Noggin mistook N.J. Addams for his son), Uncle Backwash (an unseen relative where N.J. claims that he smells funny), Uncle Boil (who Pugsley wants to grow up to be like), Loomis Addams (who invented a dance called the Bat Bite Jubilee).
| 6a | 6a | "A Thing Is Born" | Story by : David Schwartz, Bill Matheny, & Lane Raichert; Teleplay by : David Schwartz | October 17, 1992 |
We see a sad and unhappy Thing who is bored and wants to become a star. He doesn't play with the children nor help Uncle Fester in the absence of Gomez and Morticia as they had left for yet another honeymoon, Wednesday tries to help Thing and Granny predicts fame and fortune and accompanies Thing to Hollywood where his talents bring a lot of fame. Granny misses family and leaves to home after this his newfound fame also attracts a jealous movie star named Harry Palmer whose right hand lost his chance and fame thanks to Thing and tries to capture him, but Thing manages to capture Harry Palmer. Afterwards, he tells the reporters that he won't do any more films and returns home.
| 6b | 6b | "Choke and Dagger" | Story by : David Schwartz and Bill Matheny; Teleplay by : David Schwartz | October 17, 1992 |
Wednesday and Pugsley plan to go with Cousin Itt on his latest missions. The Spy Twins make various attempts to capture Cousin Itt which always tend to go wrong with the other Addams Family members thwarting their plans.
| 6c | 6c | "Fester's Diary" | Bill Matheny | October 17, 1992 |
Uncle Fester writes in his diary about his day.
| 7a | 7a | "Sir Pugsley" | Story by : David Schwartz, Ron Myrick, and Bill Matheny; Teleplay by : David Schwartz | October 24, 1992 |
The Addams Family's Annual Family Joust has arrived and every year, Wednesday always beats Pugsley in the joust. Gomez and Uncle Fester give Pugsley some pointers in order to beat Wednesday in the joust.
| 7b | 7b | "Festerman" | Story by : David Schwartz and Bill Matheny; Teleplay by : David Schwartz | October 24, 1992 |
Uncle Fester reads his comic book called "Festerman" to Wednesday. The plot of the comic details Festerman's experiment to get more power resulted in his former partner Underman (Norman Normanmeyer's comic counterpart) emerging from another dimension and wanting revenge on Festerman after Fester Anvil fell on him.
| 7c | 7c | "Art to Art" | Story by : Lane Raichert and Bill Matheny; Teleplay by : Lane Raichert | October 24, 1992 |
Morticia has lost her artistic touch. So Lurch and Thing help Morticia get her artistic touch back through whatever way possible.
| 8 | 8 | "Puttergeist" | David Schwartz and Bill Matheny | October 31, 1992 |
Gomez and Morticia are delighted by Granny's Halloween tale, which events took place forty years ago. Grandmama talks about a man who went golfing on Halloween night, and was struck by lightning, which lost him his head. He then re-appeared as the Puttergeist: a mean man with a huge golf ball for a head who scares the town at night. Wednesday and Pugsley don't believe in the Puttergeist and go trick and treating with Thing and N.J. When Wednesday uncovers Uncle Fester as a Puttergeist impostor, her remaining doubts are confirmed: Puttergeist does not exist. When the real Puttergeist shows up, attempting to scare and capture her, she is not feeling scared. While escaping with a golf car, it is revealed that Mr. Normanmeyer is the Puttergeist. He explains that the myth was started by his grandfather. N.J. is initially upset that the Puttergeist is not real, but he appreciates that his father continued the act for so long, just to please him. Moments later, the real Puttergeist drives along, confirming his existence. Family mentioned: Uncle Vermin (who loves nesting in Uncle Fester's persperation-stained pillowcases), Aunt Daddy-O (a beat poet who penned the line "Those cool Addams cats have blown the scene"), Uncle Goner (who was headless from the time he tried to saw the barnacles off his neck), Aunt Queasy (who developed a dance called "Aunt Queasy's Porcelain Tango" which the Addams Family dances to at the end of the episode).
| 9 | 9 | "F.T.V." | Story by : Bill Matheny & Lane Raichert; Teleplay by : Lane Raichert | November 7, 1992 |
The Addams Family start their own television channel which the Normanmeyers plan to ruin. Family mentioned: Uncle Spore (the author of "Fungi of the World" that was with the Addams Family until Lurch hosed down the underside of the bed), Little Uncle Green (who spoke in Martian language), Uncle Goner (who owns a travel agency that Gomez advertises on F.T.V.).
| 10 | 10 | "Itt's Over" | Story by : Earl Kress and Bill Matheny; Teleplay by : Earl Kress | November 14, 1992 |
Uncle Fester suddenly grows hair on his head and no barber-based tools can remove it since the hair is hard. The other family members work to find a way to remove the hair from Uncle Fester's head. When a latest attempt to remove hair from Uncle Fester with a hair removal formula seemingly causes the demise of Cousin Itt, Norman Normanmeyer sees this on his FesterCam and has Uncle Fester arrested for the murder of Cousin Itt. While Uncle Fester deals with his tough inmates, Wednesday and Pugsley end up figuring out what actually happened to Cousin Itt when the supposed hair-removal formula doesn't work on Pugsley. Wednesday, Pugsley, and Thing find the trail to Cousin Itt leading them to a hideaway beneath a local donut shop. Gomez, Morticia, Norman, and Normina visit Uncle Fester in jail who has become friends with his inmates after blowing himself up. Norman is upset to find out that Uncle Fester loves being in jail. Just then, Wednesday, Pugsley, and Thing arrive with Cousin Itt (who actually had to leave for an important mission at the last minute). Uncle Fester is released from prison and thanks Cousin Itt. Norman is stopped by a police officer who asks Norman if he actually witnessed the crime. Norman is thrown in jail for lying to the police and ends up at the mercy of the inmates. Back at the Addams House, Uncle Fester loses his hair from the worrying and the Addams Family celebrates this. Family mentioned: Uncle Skidmark (Morticia did a portrait of him that was improved by a trainwreck that shook the house as Gomez sees him lying by the side of the road as the cars pass by), Uncle Axe (an executioner who taught Gomez everything he knew about barber work as Fester claims that he takes too much off the top), Uncle Goner (who once caught a plague), Cousin Leech (who was Uncle Fester's closest cousin as he wonders where he is anyway).
| 11a | 11a | "Hide and Go Lurch" | Story by : Lane Raichert and Bill Matheny; Teleplay by : Lane Raichert | November 21, 1992 |
Gomez and Uncle Fester find the Hiding Horn in the attic and play Hide and Seek with Lurch where Lurch would have to find them before midnight. Yet Lurch keeps finding Gomez and Uncle Fester. Family mentioned: Uncle Chunky (Morticia finds the throw rug in the attic where he had his first coughing fit on), Aunt Sticky (who is still being electronically removed from when she climbed into Uncle Fester's coat), Aunt Ben (Gomez and Uncle Fester once hid in her sundress), Cousin Fluid (who had ears on his ankles giving him a hard time buying shoes).
| 11b | 11b | "Hook, Line and Stinkers" | Story by : Lane Raichert and Bill Matheny; Teleplay by : Lane Raichert | November 21, 1992 |
The Spy Twins kidnap Wednesday and Pugsley in order to use them as bait for Cousin Itt at their swamp hideout at the Addams Family's summer cottage. Yet Wednesday and Pugsley end up outwitting the Spy Twins where they keep getting attacked by Snappy. Family mentioned: Uncle Wince (Pugsley still has the cheese and nut log that he received from him on Christmas), Aunt Sumo (a troop of traveling boxers that beat up the Spy Twins reminded Pugsley of the time when she laid carpet with Uncle Fester).
| 11c | 11c | "A Sword Fightin' Thing" | Story by : David Schwartz and Bill Matheny; Teleplay by : David Schwartz | November 21, 1992 |
When Gomez is relaxing, Thing wants him to sword fight. Gomez tries to find other ways to relax with Thing still wanting to have a sword fight with Gomez. Family mentioned: Aunt Stiffy (who Gomez stats to Morticia that she would like the new casket previews at the funeral parlor).
| 12 | 12 | "Addams Family PTA" | Story by : David Schwartz and Bill Matheny; Teleplay by : David Schwartz | November 28, 1992 |
Morticia is sad that Wednesday and Pugsley prefer to spend their time with friends or other relatives, rather than with her. Morticia does her teaching abilities until it creeps out the teachers enough for Principal MacNamara to let her go. Upon being rehired by Principal MacNamara, Morticia decides to become more active with their school activities when the teacher in charge of it gets sick. Morticia organizes a scavenger hunt at the Addams residence. Normina Normanmeyer tries to prevent the children from going to the Addams house. Out of concern for the children's safety Normina tries to sabotage the hunt to prove the Addams house isn't safe for children and ban Morticia from further school activities forever. Her plan of destruction turns out to backfire though upon trying to use Uncle Fester's Plant Growth Formula on a plant making Morticia only more beloved with Wednesday and Pugsley's classmates. Family mentioned: Uncle Goner (who was buried under a pile of laundry when Gomez was practicing his luge run on a bobsled), Aunt Crusty (who was dug up in the backyard during the last scavenger hunt where she dug herself a new hole afterwards).
| 13a | 13a | "Little Big Thing" | Story by : Earl Kress and Bill Matheny; Teleplay by : Earl Kress | December 5, 1992 |
Granny's sight has been blurry which Gomez and Morticia notice while moonbathing. The next day, Morticia insists that she get some glasses. Granny stubbornly refuses to wear glasses. Soon, Granny accidentally uses Uncle Fester's Growth Spray that causes Thing to grow to 20 ft. After Cousin Itt saves the day and Thing is sent through the car wash, Granny eventually realizes that wearing glasses isn't bad after all. Family mentioned: Uncle Wolfgang (a werewolf who Fester howls to when saying hello on Gomez and Morticia's behalf).
| 13b | 13b | "Little Bad Riding Hood" | Story by : Lane Raichert and Bill Matheny; Teleplay by : Lane Raichert | December 5, 1992 |
Before heading to sleep, Wednesday reads her version of Little Bad Riding Hood to Pugsley where Wednesday is Little Bad Riding Hood, Thing as Littler Red Riding Hand, and Pugsley is the Big Bad Wolf.
| 13c | 13c | "Metamorphosister" | Story by : Lane Raichert and Bill Matheny; Teleplay by : Lane Raichert | December 5, 1992 |
Pugsley and Thing plan to use a formula to turn Wednesday into a dog. However, each attempt to transform Wednesday into a dog ends up turning her into different animals. Family mentioned: Uncle Mange (who Pugsley mentioned to Thing was nabbed by the dogcatcher last Spring).

=== Season 2 (1993) ===
| No. overall | No. in season | Title | Written by | Original release date |
|---|---|---|---|---|
| 14 | 1 | "Color Me Addams" | Story by : Bill Matheny and Earl Kress; Teleplay by : Earl Kress | September 18, 1993 |
Gomez persuades Morticia to hold a gallery showing of her best artworks as part of a charity art show at Wednesday and Pugsley's school. While Norman Normanmeyer stays by his phone awaiting a call for an important client, Normina plans to find a way to sabotage Morticia's art show. In trying to sabotage it, she accidentally uses living paint to bring a portrait of gargoyles to life. Family mentioned: Uncle Frostbite (who melted like Morticia's ice sculpture of him), Uncle Jigsaw (whose parts of him live with the Addams Family while his mixed-up sculpture is how he actually looks), Cousin Dribble (whose portrait was shown as Wednesday states that "she's available"), Uncle Carcass (who went on a trip to the Mojave Desert where Morticia painted a scenic depiction of it), Uncle Goner (Morticia put his leftover enzymes in her art work).
| 15 | 2 | "No Ifs, Ands or Butlers" | Story by : Bill Matheny and David Schwartz; Teleplay by : David Schwartz | September 25, 1993 |
The Addams Family discovers that Lurch is troubled. Wednesday, Pugsley, and Thing learn that Lurch wants to be a cowboy. While Lurch is taking some time off to be a cowboy, Uncle Fester ends up covering for Lurch. Wednesday, Pugsley, and Thing go with Lurch to a local range where the local foreman named Buck plans to see to it that Lurch fails the cowboy training even to the point where Buck calls in The Big As A Barn Kid. Even though Lurch is offered to become the new foreman, Lurch eventually returns to The Addams Family house since he's homesick. Family mentioned: Uncle Zombie (who had midnight snacking frenzies).
| 16a | 3a | "Jack and Jill and the Beanstalk" | Story by : Bill Matheny and David Schwartz; Teleplay by : David Schwartz | October 2, 1993 |
Wednesday and Pugsley tells Uncle Fester a story about Jack and Jill (portrayed by Wednesday and Pugsley) who end up getting magic beans from the Big Bad Wolf. The beans end up growing into a beanstalk where they end up encountering a giant (portrayed by Norman Normanmeyer).
| 16b | 3b | "Festerman Returns" | Story by : Lane Raichert and Bill Matheny; Teleplay by : Lane Raichert | October 2, 1993 |
Following a rejection slip from a comic company, Uncle Fester reads his latest comic called "Festerman Returns" to Wednesday and Thing. The plot of the comic details Festerman learning that his fellow comrades in the Fester League have gone missing. Festerman discovers that Mega Fingers is behind this upon infiltrating the Fester League disguised as Fester Gator.
| 16c | 3c | "Hand Delivered" | Bill Matheny | October 2, 1993 |
A female mail carrier who has gone against the mail carrier delivery challenges tells the viewers the story of how she had some problems when it comes to Thing who wants to help her deliver The Addams Family's mail.
| 17 | 4 | "Sweetheart of a Brother" | Bill Matheny | October 9, 1993 |
Much to Wednesday's frustration, Pugsley is abandoning their constant terrorizing each other because he has fallen in love with Shella, the school's most popular girl. Although disgusted by his soft behavior, Wednesday decides to help him out to court the foreign girl. She motivates him in to talk to her at school, and is annoyed that Shella shows no interest in him. Pugsley thinks that he can attract her attention if he is like everyone else, and drinks a normalizing formula, much to the Addams Family's shock. Distancing himself from his unusual family, Pugsley takes an interest in Norman Normanmeyer who unlike the Addams is delighted with Pugsley's new behavior. In school, he becomes a geek and is tortured by the school bully Mortimer as a result. When Mortimer is about to fight with Shella for defending Pugsley, the formula has spent its force and the real Pugsley takes revenge on him. Shella is romanced by Pugsley, but announces she has to return to her homeland soon. He and Wednesday are nevertheless happy, because their lives are now back to 'normal' and Pugsley learns that it's better to be himself. Family mentioned: Uncle Gooey (who is on the Addams Family linen).
| 18 | 5 | "Double O Honeymoon" | Bill Matheny | October 16, 1993 |
The Addams Family watch a video of Cousin Itt's mission against Ian Thundermane. Gomez and Morticia go on a spy-themed honeymoon to Spain when Ian Thundermane has escaped from prison. While Gomez and Morticia are out on their honeymoon, Ian Thundermane ends up capturing the other Addams Family members and the Normanmeyers as part of his revenge on Cousin Itt. Now it's up to Gomez and Morticia to rescue Cousin Itt and defeat Ian Thundermane. Family mentioned: Uncle Elm (who caught root rot and was made into the Addams Family's fireplace mantle), Aunt Stiffy (who Gomez found in his luggage and can never pass up an empty pine box), Aunt Spurt (a flatulent relative who once ate too much of Lurch's guacamole), Oopsie Addams (who invented a family dance called the Diaper Fling).
| 19a | 6a | "Then Came Granny" | Bill Matheny | October 23, 1993 |
Granny has lost her psychic abilities and must return to Crystal Rock in order to get them back. When the bikers at the nearby bar tell her that it's gone, Granny spells doom for them. Family mentioned: Uncle Goner (who spent his winters in the crematorium and his summer comatose in a mausoleum), Uncle Skidmark (Granny claims that she looks better on a motorcycle than him), Aunt Sumo (Granny trimmed her ear hair for 30 years).
| 19b | 6b | "Pet Show Thing" | Story by : Lane Raichert and Bill Matheny; Teleplay by : Lane Raichert | October 23, 1993 |
Wednesday and Pugsley enter a disguised Thing into the Watch-Pets Competition where the pets are stolen by Harry Palmer in a plot to get revenge on Thing.
| 19c | 6c | "Fester Sings the Fester Way" | Lane Raichert | October 23, 1993 |
Uncle Fester sings about his life with the Addams Family.
| 20a | 7a | "Camp Addams" | Story by : Bill Matheny and Ron Myrick; Teleplay by : Bill Matheny | October 30, 1993 |
Wednesday and Pugsley attend a summer camp where they are placed by Normanmeyer in Camp Holler run by D.I. Holler instead of Camp Holly where N.J. is.
| 20b | 7b | "Little Doll Lost" | Bill Matheny | October 30, 1993 |
Wednesday's doll Marie is presumed to have burned in the fireplace and Lurch offers to serve as the doll in its place.
| 20c | 7c | "King of the Polycotton Blues" | Lane Raichert and Bill Matheny | October 30, 1993 |
Norman and Normina sing a blues song explaining to N.J. why they hate the Addams Family. Note: The episode ends with a harmonica solo playing over the credits in a sort of parody of Roseanne.
| 21a | 8a | "A Girl and a Ghoul" | Story by : Bill Matheny and Ron Myrick; Teleplay by : Bill Matheny | November 6, 1993 |
Wednesday is thrilled when she wins a competition to have horror-themed TV host Graveyard Gary visit her home. Gomez is supportive, but worries that Wednesday is more inspired by Gary than him. Family mentioned: Uncle Rancid (Gomez suggested that they put too fresh produce under Uncle Fester's mattress as Morticia claims "It does wonders for Uncle Rancid").
| 21b | 8b | "A Little Bit of Pugsley" | Bill Matheny | November 6, 1993 |
Pugsley is the only one of the family who hasn't mastered his own dance and Thing decides to help him.
| 21c | 8c | "Ask Granny" | Bill Matheny | November 6, 1993 |
Granny hosts her own question show.

== Principal voice actors ==
- John Astin - Gomez Addams
- Dick Beals - N.J. Normanmeyer
- Carol Channing - Granny Frump
- Jim Cummings - Lurch, Spy Twins, Underwear Hitman "Fingers" (in "Happyester Fester"), RumpCo CEO (in "Happyester Fester", "Pet Show Thing"), Harry Palmer (in "A Thing is Born"), Mega Fingers (in "Festerman Returns"), Hairdo (in "Double O Honeymoon")
- Debi Derryberry - Wednesday Addams
- Jeannie Elias - Pugsley Addams
- Pat Fraley - Cousin Itt, Prison Guard (in "Itt's Over"), Police Officer (in "Little Big Thing", "Color Me Addams"), Camper (in "Camp Addams")
- Nancy Linari - Morticia Frump Addams
- Edie McClurg - Normina Normanmeyer
- Rob Paulsen - Norman Normanmeyer, Uncle Cleaver (in "N.J. Addams"), Van Swash (in "Color Me Addams")
- Rip Taylor - Uncle Fester

=== Additional voices ===
- Pamela Adlon - Mortimer (in "Sweetheart of a Brother")
- Michael Bell - Buck (in "No Ifs, Ands or Butlers")
- Earl Boen -
- Julie Brown -
- Ruth Buzzi -
- Peter Cullen - The Big As A Barn Kid (in "No Ifs, Ands or Butlers")
- Héctor Elizondo - Ian Thundermane (in "Double O Honeymoon")
- Richard Gautier -
- Robert Guillaume - Mr. Corblarb (in "Color Me Addams")
- Ernest Harada - Mr. Limp (in "Dead and Breakfast")
- Anna Maria Horsford - Mayor of Happydale Heights (in "F.T.V.")
- Candy Houston -
- Gordon Hunt -
- Erv Immerman -
- Nick Jameson -
- Vicki Juditz -
- Page Leong -
- Brian Mitchell -
- Ian Monfette -
- Marion Ramsey -
- Hal Rayle -
- Charles Nelson Reilly - Watch-Pet Competition Judge (in "Pet Show Thing")
- Robert Ridgely -
- Susan Silo - Mrs. Quaint (in "Dead and Breakfast")
- Marcelo Tubert -
- Renée Victor -
- Marcia Wallace - Mrs. Blossom (in "Sweetheart of a Brother")
- Marsha Warfield - Mail Carrier (in "Hand Delivered")
- Frank Welker - Boxing Turtle (in "Pet Show Thing"), Doberman Pinscher (in "Pet Show Thing"), Poddles (in "Pet Show Thing")
- Anderson Wong -

== Merchandise ==
Playmates Toys developed a line of nine action figures based on The Addams Family animated series. Ultimately, six characters were released: Gomez, Morticia, Uncle Fester, Lurch, Pugsley, and Granny. The remaining figures - Wednesday, Thing, and Cousin Itt - were advertised as “Coming Soon!” on the packaging but were never produced. Each figure featured multiple points of articulation, themed accessories, and a character biography printed on the cardback. Although no commercial was ever created to promote the line, a tie-in coloring book was released.
