= Kevin Shinick =

American writer (born 1969)

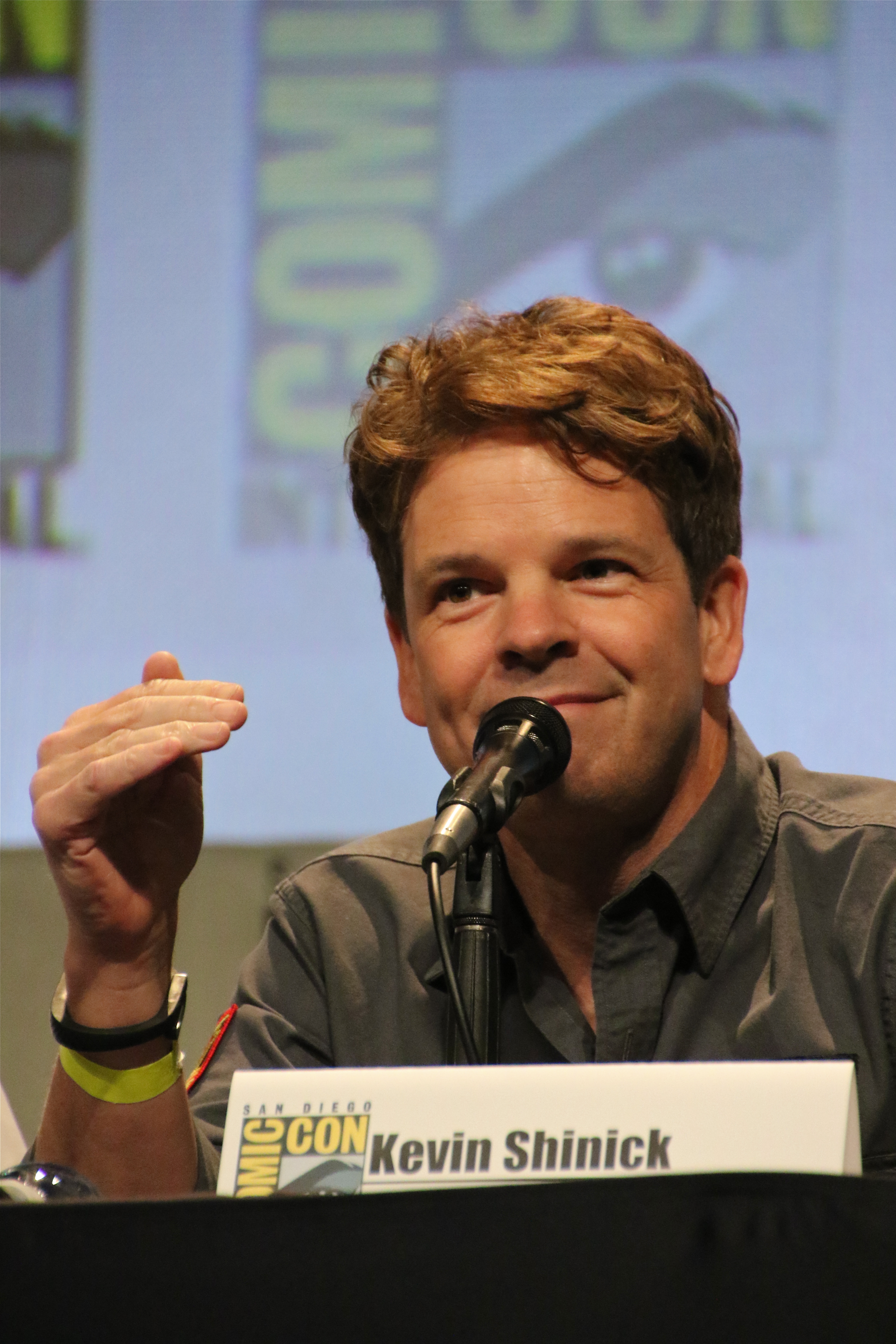
- Shinick at San Diego Comic Con in 2015
- Born: Kevin Thomas Shinick; March 19, 1969 (age 57); Merrick, New York, U.S.
- Occupations: Writer; producer; director; actor; comic book creator
- Years active: 1992–present
- Spouse: Eileen Myers
- Relatives: Scott Shinick (brother)

Kevin Thomas Shinick (/ˈʃɪnɪk/ SHIN-ik; born March 19, 1969) is an American writer, producer, director and actor, as well as a comic book creator. Shinick received an Emmy award for his work on the stop-motion animated series Robot Chicken, and an Emmy nomination for his work on Mad, the animated series based on the iconic humor magazine, before serving as showrunner and supervising producer for the Disney XD series Spider-Man. He was also the host and portrayed the ACME Time Net Squadron Leader in the PBS series Where in Time Is Carmen Sandiego?.

== Biography ==
=== Early life ===
Shinick was born in the Long Island suburb of Merrick, New York. He attended Sanford H. Calhoun High School, and continued onto nearby Hofstra University, where he earned a bachelor's degree in both theatre and communication. During this time, he appeared as a contestant on the game show Jackpot during its first week in September 1989.

=== Theatre career ===
A year after graduating college, Shinick was cast in Tony Randall's Broadway production of The Seagull opposite Ethan Hawke, Laura Linney, Tyne Daly, Jon Voight, and Tony Roberts. Subsequent Broadway plays followed, including Night Must Fall with Matthew Broderick, The School For Scandal with Randall, The Government Inspector with Lainie Kazan, and the Tony-nominated productions of Timon of Athens and Saint Joan.

In 2002, Shinick served as writer and director for Spider-Man Live!, a Broadway-style adaptation of Spider-Man that played to large venues such as Radio City Music Hall. The show embarked on a 40-city U.S. tour and has the distinction of being the first full-length live-action stage show based on the character.

=== Television and film work ===
In 1996, Shinick was a host and squadron leader in the PBS television series Where in Time Is Carmen Sandiego?, which led him to appear in merchandise such as trading cards and action figures.

In 2004, Shinick wrote, directed, and starred in the romantic comedy film It's About Time.

Beginning in 2007, Shinick began working as a writer for the Adult Swim stop-motion series Robot Chicken. Over time, he became a director and producer as well.

In 2010, Shinick created the animated sketch series Mad with Mark Marek, additionally serving as a producer and writer. Mad ran for four seasons and ended in December 2013.

From 2017 to 2018, Shinick was a producer and writer for the Disney XD series Spider-Man. Also in 2017, Shinick joined the writing staff of the Netflix comedy series Disjointed, created by Chuck Lorre and David Javerbaum and starring Kathy Bates as the owner of a pot dispensary.

As an actor, Shinick has guest starred on various television shows, including Grimm, Masters of Sex, Major Crimes, Trust Me, Rizzoli & Isles, Without a Trace, and Monday Mornings. Additionally, he voiced Bruce Banner in Avengers Assemble, Guardians of the Galaxy, and Spider-Man.

Shinick appeared as a guest on The George Lucas Talk Show during their May the AR Be LI$$ You Arli$$ marathon fundraiser.

In March 2024, Shinick was announced to portray Dick Clark in the biographical musical drama Michael.

=== Comic books ===
Since 2009, Shinick has written comics for both Marvel Comics and DC Comics. For DC, he wrote the annual "Batman 80-Page Giant" and "Joker's Asylum II: Clayface". For Marvel, he wrote Avenging Spider-Man, Superior Carnage, Superior Spider-Man Team-Up, and AXIS: Hobgoblin.

=== Novels ===
In 2019, Shinick wrote the young-adult novel Force Collector as part of the Journey to Star Wars series.

== Filmography ==
=== Television ===
Year	Title	Role	Notes
1996–1997	Where in Time Is Carmen Sandiego?	Himself (Host/Squadron Leader)	Game Show
1998	Kenan & Kel	Bugman	Episode: "Attack of the Bug Man"
2006	Without a Trace	Tom Ellison	Episode: "Stolen"
2007–2017	Robot Chicken	Various characters (voice)	Also writer and director
2009	Trust Me	Jeff	Episode: "Norming"
2010–2013	Mad	Various characters (voice)	Also producer and writer
2012	Grimm	Ryan Gilko	Episode: "Quill"
2013	Major Crimes	Barry Lawrence	Episode: "All In"
2013	Monday Mornings	Levi Hostetler	2 episodes
2014	Creature Commandos	Vincent Velcro, Elliot Taylor (voice)	3 episodes
2014	Masters of Sex	Mr. Durang	Episode: "Asterion"
2014	Mike Tyson Mysteries	N/A	Wrote the episode "Ultimate Judgement Day"
2015	Rizzoli & Isles	Gary	Episode: "Imitation Game"
2015	SuperMansion	Narrator (voice)	Episode: "Groaner's Wild"
2016	TripTank	Steve, Guy Friend (voice)	Episode: "Buck Wild"
2017	Justice League Action	Dad (voice)	Episode: "Nuclear Family Values"
2017–2018	Avengers Assemble	Bruce Banner (voice)	3 episodes; also wrote the episode "Thunderbolts Revealed"
2017	Spider-Man	Bruce Banner (voice)	Episode: "Halloween Moon"; also writer and producer (26 episodes)
2019	Guardians of the Galaxy	Bruce Banner (voice)	Episode: "With a Little Help from My Friends"
2021	Beebo Saves Christmas	Kyle, Polar Bear (voice)	Television special; also writer and producer
2024	Tales of the Teenage Mutant Ninja Turtles	N/A	Wrote the episode "Night of the Mechazoids"

=== Film ===
Year	Title	Role	Notes
2015	Scooby-Doo! and Kiss: Rock and Roll Mystery	N/A	Writer
2019	Godzilla: King of the Monsters	Weather Man	
2026	Michael	Dick Clark	
