= Mania (character) =

- Andi Benton as Mania in cover of Absolute Carnage: Scream #2. Art by Declan Shalvey.

Publication information
- Publisher: Marvel Comics
- First appearance: Venom #1 (June 2003)
- Created by: Original depiction and Patricia Robertson: Daniel Way (writer); Francisco Herrera (artist); Mania symbiote and Andi Benton: Cullen Bunn (writer); Pepe Larraz (co-artist); Declan Shalvey (co-artist); Lee Price: Mike Costa (writer); Gerardo Sandoval (artist)

In-story information
- Alter ego: Various hosts
- Species: Klyntar (clone)
- Team affiliations: Venom-Army, Inkling
- Notable aliases: Patricia Robertson: Venom, She-Venom; Andi Benton: Mania, Scream, Silence; Lee Price: Maniac
- Abilities: Alien symbiote grants: All powers of the predecessor's first human host; Limited shapeshifting and camouflage; Symbiote's autonomous defense capabilities; Undetectable by Spider-sense

Mania (also known as Venom and Maniac) is a fictional character appearing in American comic books published by Marvel Comics. It first appeared in Venom #1 and was created by Daniel Way and Francisco Herrera. Belonging to a race of amorphous extraterrestrial parasites known as Symbiotes, its hosts are Patricia Robertson, Andrea "Andi" Benton and Lee Price.

== Publication history ==
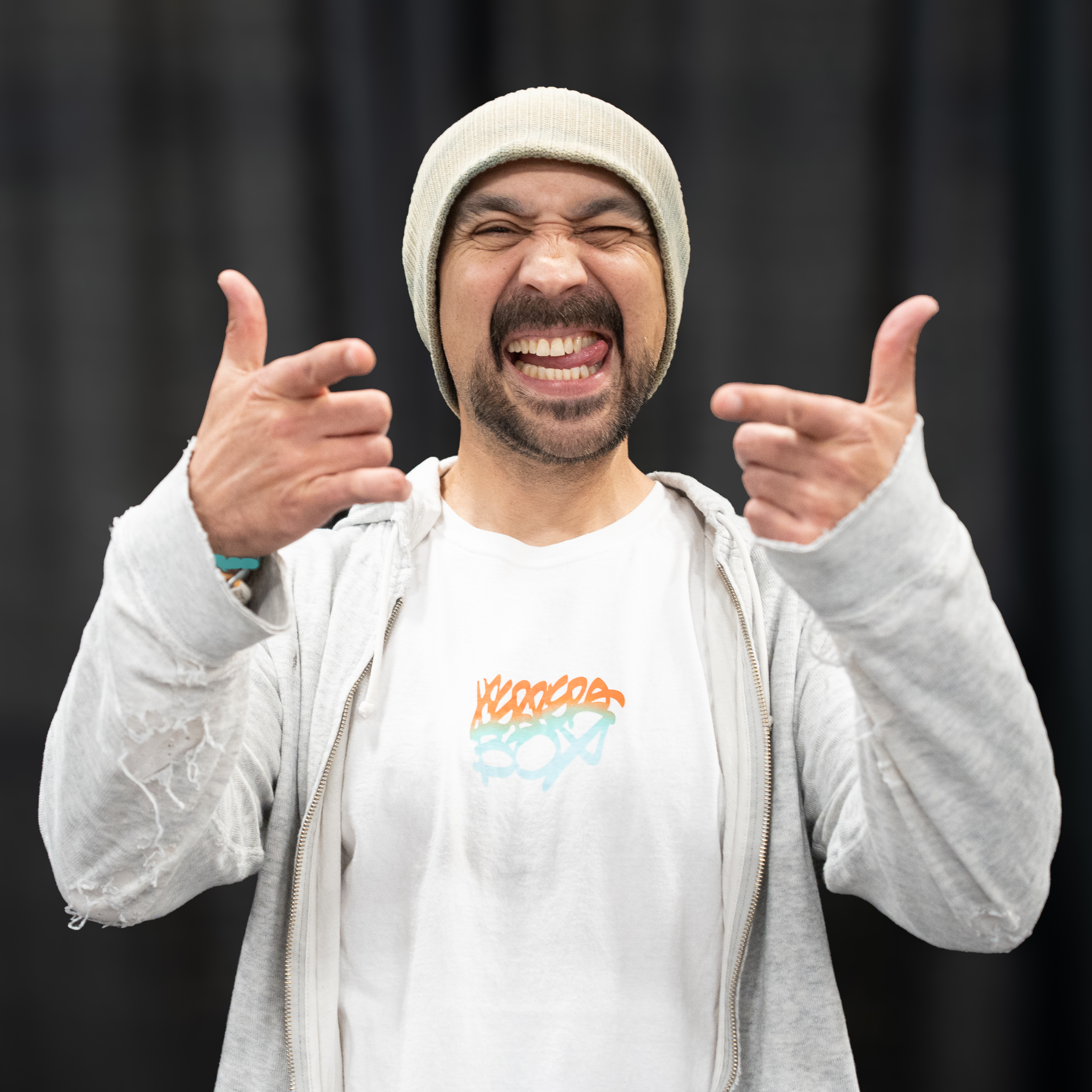
Francisco Herrera at Comic Con Oakland 2026

The Mania symbiote first appeared in the 2003 Venom limited series by Daniel Way and Francisco Herrera as "Venom" with the first major host Patricia Robertson. It was not referred to as Mania until the 2011 relaunch began by Rick Remender and Cullen Bunn, with Bunn christening the character as Mania. The second most significant host Andrea Benton was created by Bunn as well, while the third major host Lee Price was created by Mike Costa.

== Hosts ==
=== Various hosts ===
The Mania symbiote was cloned from a piece of the original Venom symbiote's tongue that was obtained by the Ararat Corporation, intended to facilitate Bob's goal of exterminating all life on Earth. Engineered in the Ararat Corporation's Mesa Verde Laboratory in New Mexico, the symbiote clone initially refused to bond to any of the test subjects offered as hosts, instead opting to brutally kill them—not to devour them, but out of sadistic enjoyment. But when presented with a choice between two prospective hosts — the elderly mental patient Alfonse Poina and the prison inmate Eric Moody, sentenced for killing six men — the symbiote attacked both. When Moody managed to fight it off, the symbiote bonded to Poina, mocking Moody over having been raped in prison — memories it gleaned from being in contact with him - before implicitly raping and killing him.

Following it deliberately killing its host by draining him of his vital fluids, the symbiote (now known as Venom) was deemed ready by Bob and sent to an Ararat Corporation laboratory in the Canadian Arctic, where after nineteen months Bob released it from containment and it slaughtered all but one of the scientists. Shortly afterwards, Patricia Robertson, a lieutenant in the US Army stationed at the nearby Christmastown radar station, arrived at the laboratory on an errand and the Venom symbiote lured her inside by impersonating someone calling for help. While Robertson investigated the carnage, the Venom symbiote bonded to Ivan, one of her sled dogs, and was brought back to the Christmastown base. The Venom symbiote detached itself from the dog and bonded to Harold Saunders, transferring to Colonel Michael Malone that evening and burying Saunders' corpse in the snow, where it was dug up and partially eaten by Ivan the following day. The Venom symbiote impersonated Malone until it had gotten the Ararat survivor, Perry, alone and then attacked him. When Robertson and Daniel Jackson responded to Perry's screams, the Venom symbiote attacked them and was about to transfer to Robertson when it was attacked by a strange man in a black suit, wielding a cell-phone capable of shooting lightning. Jackson's intervention to protect his CO enabled the Venom symbiote to escape, pursued by the Suit. Having drained Malone to death, the Venom symbiote set a trap for the Suit and ambushed him, tearing him to pieces and revealing him to be an artificial construct assembled by spider-like extraterrestrial machines.

Finding Jackson and Robertson bound together in a storage closet, the Venom symbiote took over Jackson, telling Robertson it had already killed the other members of the team. When asked by Robertson if it was going to kill her too, the Venom symbiote said that because it liked her it was going to give her a sporting chance first, breaking her bonds. Tripping Patricia before she could escape, the Venom symbiote attacked, gloating over her terror. Before it could kill her, Jerome Delacroix intervened and held it at gunpoint, but the Venom symbiote caught him off guard by revealing its host's face and knocked him out. To torture Robertson, the Venom symbiote told her it was going to consume Delacroix from the inside out before returning for her, and left to transfer to its new host. Retrieving and cocooning the corpses of its former hosts and leaving them on display, the Venom symbiote attacked Robertson once she found them, but she accidentally shot it in the chest with her grenade launcher. Separated from Delacroix's drained body, the Venom symbiote took over Perry after he and Robertson were knocked out by the reconstituted Suit blowing up the facility's vehicles, impersonating him in an attempt to trick Robertson into helping it escape. When the Suit confronted them, the Venom symbiote urged Robertson to kill him, but Suit revealed its deception. Having drained Perry to death, the Venom symbiote prevented the Suit from killing Robertson and tore him apart again, then rebonded to Ivan and escaped into the wilderness.

Headed for the nearest settlement, Voici in the Northwest Territories, the Venom symbiote transferred to a crow when the sled-dog died, jumping to a man named Orrie and from him to another man named Clem, using his skidoo to travel the rest of the way to Voici. Having drained Clem, the Venom symbiote stopped at a diner owned by a woman named Nan, impersonating its host and telling an older man named Yooper that it intended to kill and eat everyone. Taking over Nan, the Venom symbiote pretended to flee the diner and was attacked by Vic and Frankie, agents sent by the Ararat Corporation to become its hosts. When Wolverine intervened, the Venom symbiote unveiled itself and attacked, seeing him as the ideal host due to his healing factor and adamantium claws. The Venom symbiote's fight with Wolverine was interrupted by the Suit, who seemingly killed Logan, but the Venom symbiote mockingly informed the Suit it would just bond with Wolverine once he healed. Their confrontation was interrupted by Vic, who offered herself to the Venom symbiote, but the Suit told the Venom symbiote that Vic had been outfitted by a cybernetic collar that connected to her brain and would allow her to control it. When Yooper exited the diner, the Venom symbiote selected him as its next host and latched onto a bullet fired by Vic, bonding to the old man and preparing to resume the fight. Vic retreated and reunited with Frankie — who had captured Robertson — in their ship, dropping an atomic bomb on Voici to kill any other potential hosts.

The Venom symbiote survived the nuke by taking over a swarm of cockroaches, killing Frankie. The Venom symbiote then ambushed Wolverine and took over him, slicing the Suit to pieces and attacking Robertson, who the Suit had outfitted with Vic's cybernetic collar. Despite being bonded to the ideal host, the Venom symbiote prepared to jump to Robertson, but was interrupted by the arrival of a second Vic and Frankie. Crashing their ship, the Venom symbiote abducted and killed Frankie 2.0, leaving Vic 2.0 to stumble across Vic 1.0's corpse and have an existential crisis, seemingly killing herself. The Venom symbiote returned to attack Robertson, who used a phone the Suit constructed to detonate his original phone, which had been implanted in Wolverine's chest. Separated from its host, the Venom symbiote bonded to Robertson, informing her of its purpose.

Robertson, as She-Venom, traveled to New York to kill Eddie Brock after learning of the cloned Venom symbiote's purpose. Their first battle ended inconclusively due to the intervention of S.H.I.E.L.D. and Spider-Man. Robertson's control collar was deactivated by Bob, enabling the cloned Venom symbiote to begin taking over her, but before she completely lost control it was repaired by the Suit and Vic 2.0, who had taken up Frankie's identity and turned against the Ararat Corporation. Frankie revealed that the cloned Venom symbiote had been engineered to merge with and induce reproductive hormones into the original Venom symbiote in order to give birth to a horde of symbiotes that would exterminate all life on Earth. Robertson was taken to the Fantastic Four, who intended to use her to lure Brock into a trap and let the Suit kill him. She was taken to a secure location by Mr. Fantastic and the Human Torch, but Bob attacked and incapacitated them. Impersonating the Suit again, he tricked Robertson into going after Brock and deactivated the control collar once she was within range. The cloned Venom symbiote immediately abandoned her and was absorbed into the original Venom symbiote, making Brock even more powerful than ever and setting the stage for the endgame of Bob's plan.

=== Andi Benton ===
After Dark Reign and Spider-Man: Big Time where the Venom symbiote was forcibly removed from Mac Gargan in the Raft and was then bonded to Flash Thompson as a new host who was acting as a substitute gym teacher in Philadelphia, Andrea Benton (one of Flash's students) was caught up in Flash's enmity with the supervillain Jack O'Lantern who tried to kill her with poison gas. Flash sent what was thought to be a part of the Venom symbiote to protect her, which ended up bonding with Andrea rather than only protecting her from her imminent death. Andi openly embraced the power given her and used it to exact revenge on the crime lord Lord Ogre who was responsible for her father's death. Her activities as "Mania" drew the attention of the Department of Occult Armaments agents Crossbones and Master Mayhem who were harvesting Hell-Marks, which Mania bore.

When Venom and Mania tried to contact Mephisto to remove Andi's Hell-Mark, Mephisto revealed that the portion of the symbiote Mania wore was actually the symbiote clone managed to spit back out, purging the Hell-Mark with it. Andrea remained bonded to the Mania symbiote when Flash departed into space, using it to fight crime, but the Hell-Mark gradually began corrupting Andi, driving her into a murderous bloodlust as she began brutally assaulting criminals.

After learning that the Hell-Mark's possession had taken a turn for the worse, Flash came back to Earth and captured Mania, stripping the Mania symbiote off Andi with the help of Spider-Man, and reabsorbing it into the Venom symbiote to cleanse it. Flash soon learned that the Hell-Mark had been passed from the Mania symbiote to its host, and Andi, possessed by the Hell-Mark, attacked Flash intending to kill him and take both the Venom symbiote and its clone for herself. The effects of the Hell-Mark were suppressed once Flash's allies arrived and provided him with a purifying elixir from the planet Wenb which he injected into Andi. Flash also returned the Mania symbiote to Andi, and both set out to find a permanent cure to Andi's condition.

In Venomverse, she was summoned by the Venomized Doctor Strange along with other Venoms from alternate realities into the fighting the alien race known as the Poisons. In the end they were "victorious", she along with the surviving Venoms returned to their home.

After being detached from her Mania symbiote and the death of Flash, Andi started working at a record store, despite being haunted by the nightmares of the Mania symbiote. Eventually, Cletus Kasady went after her and tried to get the codex from her body, but Andi used the Hell-Mark to summon Hellfire and the Monsters of Evil, which were quickly killed by Cletus, and then Andi formed a demonic armor around her and managed to escape Cletus, leaving her to go warn Eddie.

Looming over Scream and Andi Benton, Carnage mockingly asks if they thought he was too busy to come and handle things himself - noting that killing Andi is personal. Andi hesitantly asks Scream for help, but Scream - marked by Knull's spiral sigil - retorts that she has no choice but to obey Carnage's orders. With a cry of despair, Andi runs - leaving Carnage and Scream watching her until Carnage asks what Scream is waiting for, ordering her to bring Andi back so that he can feed the beast. Persuading the Scream symbiote to resist Knull's control a second time, Patricia sacrificed herself in an attempt to save Andi's life, and the Scream symbiote left her corpse and bonded to Andi. Transformed into a black-haired version of the Scream symbiote, Andi breaks free of the meathook and feels the Scream symbiote healing her wounds; reveling in the power of being bonded to a symbiote once more. Andi notes that she can feel not only the Scream symbiote's mental voice, but those of Carnage's doppelgänger horde. She feels Carnage trying to compel her to obey his will, but sneers that she never liked doing what she was told. Snaring Carnage's arm with her tendril-hair, Scream unleashes a torrent of hellfire from her maw - blasting Carnage in the face. Retorting that he thought she would have remembered his immunity to fire after their last encounter, Carnage attempts to impale the new Scream like he'd done with Patricia, but she leaps over him. Lunging at her, Carnage impales Scream with his hand and snarls that he's the voice inside her head telling her to stay and die. Scream snares him with tendril hair and slams him into the dangling meat, Andi noting that even with a symbiote she's not powerful enough to fight him. Lamenting that she had not even known Patricia Robertson's name before the Scream symbiote bonded to her, Andi vows not to let her sacrifice be in vain. Cocooning Carnage in her hair, Scream tosses him into a meat locker, slams the door, and flees. Smashing the door off its hinges, Carnage notes that Andi has escaped and grouses that he will have to wait for another rematch with her before turning to harvest the Mania and Scream codices from Patricia's corpse.

After losing the Scream symbiote because of the Carnage symbiote, Andi is in Alchemax's custody before being killed by Phage, but is revived when the symbiote remnants of Scream and the samples of the Anti-Venom symbiote merge to form Silence. In this form, Andi teams up with Flash and Toxin to stop a conspiracy, where the symbiotes disrupt the Friends of Humanity.

=== Lee Price ===
Lee Price and a couple of hired thugs ambushed Andi out patrolling, blasting her with flamethrowers and a high-powered sonic gun to separate her from the symbiote. While Andi survived (albeit badly injured) Price took the symbiote for himself and rechristened himself "Maniac". Lee used the Maniac symbiote to take control of criminals and assemble his own syndicate, forcing pieces of the Maniac symbiote into people's faces to bend them to his will.

When Spider-Man, Agent Anti-Venom, Venom, Black Cat and Andi joined forces to stop him, they used weaponry coated in an Anti-Venom serum developed by Alchemax to free those under Maniac's control. With his army defeated, Maniac commanded the remains of the Maniac symbiote to return to him, making him stronger and exponentially larger. While Maniac initially overpowered the heroes, Black Cat noticed those freed from his control by Anti-Venom developed immunity. Spider-Man had Agent Anti-Venom absorb a sample of his blood to absorb its "Anti-Maniac" properties. With his abilities boosted Anti-Venom struck Maniac down, severely weakening the Maniac symbiote - though it survived and remained bonded to Price who was then apprehended and taken away by authorities.

When Kasady was collecting the codex left inside the bodies of previous hosts to free Knull, Kasady disguised himself as Brock and went in jail where he killed Lee after absorbing the Maniac symbiote off him, blaming Brock for the ensuing murder.

== Other versions ==
An alternate universe version of Mania from an unidentified universe makes a minor appearance in Deadpool & the Mercs for Money #5.

== In other media ==
=== Television ===
The Mania symbiote appears in the Spider-Man series finale "Maximum Venom", voiced by Carla Jeffery. This version is the older sister of the Venom symbiote who was created by Knull to serve as a member of the Symbiote Sisters alongside Scream and Scorn.

=== Video games ===
- Both Andi Benton / Mania and Lee Price / Maniac appear as playable characters in Spider-Man Unlimited.
- Andi Benton / Silence appears as an alternate costume for Scream in Marvel Future Fight.
