= Hippo (character) =

Publication information
- Publisher: Marvel Comics
- First appearance: Dark Reign: The Sinister Spider-Man #1 (August 2009)
- Created by: Brian Reed; Chris Bachalo; Tim Townsend

In-story information
- Species: Uplifted hippopotamus
- Place of origin: Earth
- Team affiliations: Redeemers; Menagerie
- Notable aliases: Mrs. Fluffy Lumpkins
- Abilities: Superhuman strength Hard hide Water adaptation

Hippo is a supervillain appearing in American comic books published by Marvel Comics. The character was introduced in the series Dark Reign as an uplifted hippopotamus who was attacked by Venom and lost his left leg to him. In later appearances, Hippo was established as an enemy of Spider-Man and regained his leg without explanation.

== Publication history ==
Hippo first appeared in Dark Reign: The Sinister Spider-Man #1 (August 2009), and was created by Brian Reed, Chris Bachalo, and Tim Townsend.

== Fictional character biography ==
Hippo is an ordinary zoo hippopotamus named Mrs. Fluffy Lumpkins who was uplifted into an anthropomorphic form by the High Evolutionary. While Hippo is on a crime spree, his left leg is eaten by Venom, who is masquerading as Spider-Man as a member of the Dark Avengers. Hippo joins the Redeemers alongside Dementoid, Doctor Everything, Eleven, and General Wolfram in a plan to redeem "Spider-Man".

Hippo is later seen fighting New Avengers members Spider-Man and Ronin. During this appearance, Hippo is shown to have his leg restored, with no explanation as to how he regained it. Both heroes have a hard time taking down Hippo, who is defeated by Luke Cage.

Hippo begins attending Super Villains Anonymous meetings at a church alongside Boomerang, Doctor Bong, Grizzly, Looter, Mirage, and Porcupine. At another meeting, Grizzly and Looter tell Hippo about their run-ins with Spider-Man.

Hippo later appears as a member of the Menagerie alongside Skein, White Rabbit, and Panda-Mania. They were on a rampage stealing expensive eggs from an auction until Spider-Man arrives. Hippo and the Menagerie are defeated by Spider-Man. Hippo and the rest of the Menagerie reunite to commit a diamond heist, but they are once again defeated by Spider-Man.

== Powers and abilities ==
As a hippopotamus, Hippo possesses superhuman strength and durability. He is also shown to be very adept in the water.

== Reception ==
In 2020, Comic Book Resources (CBR) ranked Hippo 4th in their "Spider-Man: 10 Weirdest Animal Villains From The Comics That We'd Like To See In The MCU" list.

== In other media ==
Hippo appears in the Spider-Man episode "Bring on the Bad Guys", voiced by Zack Shada.
