= Robbie Robertson (character) =

Fictional character

- Robbie Robertson from The Pulse #2. Art by Mark Bagley.

Publication information
- Publisher: Marvel Comics
- First appearance: The Amazing Spider-Man #51 (August 1967)
- Created by: Stan Lee (editor/writer); John Romita Sr. (artist)

In-story information
- Full name: Joseph/Joe "Robbie" Robertson
- Team affiliations: Daily Bugle; Front Line
- Supporting character of: Spider-Man; Daredevil

Joseph "Robbie" Robertson is a fictional character appearing in American comic books published by Marvel Comics, usually in association with Spider-Man. Created by Stan Lee and John Romita Sr., he first appeared in The Amazing Spider-Man #51 (August 1967), and has since endured as a supporting character of Spider-Man.

Robbie Robertson was one of the first black characters in comics to play a serious supporting role, rather than act as comic relief. He has usually been a high-ranking editor at the New York newspaper, the Daily Bugle, and a close friend and confidant of publisher J. Jonah Jameson, acting as a voice of reason in Jameson's campaign to discredit Spider-Man. He is more friendly and supportive of Peter Parker as well as the other Daily Bugle staffers than the brash Jameson. In the 1980s, the character's backstory was explored, revealing a past conflict with the supervillain Tombstone, with whom he attended high school; these stories were well received by readers and contributed to greater interest in his character.

The character has appeared in several media adaptations outside of comics over the years, including films, animated series, and video games. Actor Bill Nunn played Robbie Robertson in Sam Raimi's Spider-Man film trilogy (2002-2007), and Lamorne Morris portrayed him in the television series Spider-Noir (2026).

== Publication history ==
Gerry Conway's run on The Spectacular Spider-Man and Web of Spider-Man expanded Robertson's backstory with a dark history involving the hit man Tombstone which continues to haunt Robertson in the present. The stories drew an exceptionally intense level of reader interest. Editor Jim Salicrup recalled that "some of the most jaded, seen-it-all before guys – namely the guys in Marvel's production department – got hooked on the Tombstone/Joe Robertson soap opera. They'd actually come into my office concerned about what was going to happen to Robbie next. 'He's not going to jail, is he?' they'd ask".

== Fictional character biography ==
Joseph Robertson was born in Harlem. He is married to Martha and they have had two sons. Their first son, Patrick Henry Robertson, died when he was only six months old. Their second son, Randy, is divorced. Growing up in a working-class family and being a member of a racial minority, Robertson seemed to sympathize with the downtrodden, including Marvel Comics' mutants, and he preached tolerance. He was forced to practice what he preached when his son came home from college with his white Jewish wife, Amanda.

Robertson is the editor-in-chief of the Daily Bugle, the newspaper at which Peter Parker works and sells his photographs of Spider-Man. Unlike the Bugle's volatile publisher, J. Jonah Jameson, Robbie tries his best to remain objective towards Spider-Man. Robbie is also the only Bugle employee who does not fear the wrath of his boss and is ready to stand up to him on editorial matters. Robbie serves as publisher when Jameson temporarily steps down. Robbie was a close personal friend of Captain George Stacy, and it has been implied, although not outright stated, that Robbie has deduced Spider-Man's secret identity, as Stacy did. Robbie's son Randy is also a close friend of Peter Parker, and the two briefly share an apartment when Mary Jane is presumed dead and Peter had been evicted.

Robbie grew up in Harlem, and as a teenager was a classmate of Lonnie Lincoln, later infamous as the brutal hit man Tombstone. Robbie once wrote an article for the high school newspaper about Lincoln's bullying and extortion, but spiked it after being threatened by Lincoln. Years later, while working as a reporter in Philadelphia, Robbie witnessed Lincoln murder one of Robbie's contacts. Once again, Lincoln threatened Robertson, and the journalist fled to New York City and began working for the Bugle. He told no one of the murder he witnessed.

Twenty years later, when Tombstone takes a job with the Kingpin, Robbie, determined not to be intimidated again, begins collecting evidence of past crimes that would have Tombstone incarcerated for life. Tombstone hunts Robbie down and breaks his back with his bare hands. Robbie is laid up for months as a result of this, but makes a full recovery, as his spine was not broken.

Tombstone is arrested and tried, thanks in part to Spider-Man. Breaking 20 years of silence, Robbie testifies against his old schoolmate in court. The judge, however, is on the Kingpin's payroll and circumstances lead to Robertson having to agree to serve 3 years himself for withholding evidence of the Philadelphia murder. Robbie and Tombstone end up in the same cell block, where the hit man makes Robbie's life miserable. So broken is Robbie's spirit that he halfheartedly goes along with a jailbreak. However, when Tombstone attacks an interfering Spider-Man, Robbie regains his nerve and saves him. Robbie and Tombstone fall out of the escape helicopter and land in a river near an Amish farm.

Things come to a head when Robbie attempts to defend the farmer's family from Tombstone, stabbing him with a pitchfork. Stunned by this, Tombstone backs off. While Tombstone has not abandoned his murderous ways, he abandons his vendetta on Robbie. Robbie receives a pardon and resumes work at the Daily Bugle.

In Spider-Man: One More Day and Spider-Man: Brand New Day, Jameson suffers a heart attack and the Bugle is bought by Dexter Bennett. Robbie, though disapproving, decides to stay, hoping Bennet will improve. He soon realizes that is not going to happen and resigns. Robbie becomes the editor for Ben Urich's newspaper, Front Line.

After Phil Urich is exposed as the Hobgoblin, Robbie benches Ben Urich until the situation blows over and fires Phil's ex-girlfriend Norah Winters. During the later Goblin coup of New York, Ben attempts to arrange a meeting to talk Phil down and convince him to accept a cure for the Goblin formula. When Robbie is discovered in the area, Phil believes that Ben was trying to set a trap and delivers a serious injury to Robbie before Spider-Man appears.

== Other versions ==
=== Age of Apocalypse ===
An alternate universe version of Robbie Robertson appears in Tales from the Age of Apocalypse #2. This version is the editor of the Daily Bugle who is later killed by a Brood-infected Christopher Summers.

=== Marvel Noir ===
An alternate universe version of Robbie Robertson appears in Spider-Man Noir: Eyes Without a Face. While investigating the disappearances of African-Americans from Harlem, he is captured and lobotomized by Doctor Octopus.

=== Spider-Verse ===
An alternate universe version of Robbie Robertson appears in The Amazing Spider-Man (vol. 3) #9. This version works for the Inheritors as an importer and trader.

=== Ultimate Marvel ===
An alternate universe version of Robbie Robertson appears in Ultimate Spider-Man (2000). This version does not possess a strong connection to Peter Parker.

=== Ultimate Universe ===
An alternate universe version of Robbie Robertson appears in Ultimate Spider-Man (2024). This version worked with Ben Parker and J. Jonah Jameson in the Daily Bugle until their resignations. Robbie is later revealed to be a Mysterio.

=== What If? ===
An alternate universe version of Robbie Robertson appears in What If #24. This version quit the Daily Bugle after J. Jonah Jameson outs Spider-Man's secret identity amidst Spider-Man and Gwen Stacy's wedding.

== In other media ==
=== Television ===
Robbie Robertson as he appears on Spider-Man: The Animated Series.

- A young Robbie Robertson appears in The Amazing Spider-Man, portrayed by Hilly Hicks.
- Robbie Robertson appears in Spider-Man (1981), voiced by Lewis Bailey.
- Robbie Robertson appears in Spider-Man: The Animated Series, voiced by Rodney Saulsberry. Similarly to the comics, he is J. Jonah Jameson's right-hand man who is always trying to convince him that Spider-Man is not evil as well as the former childhood friend of Lonnie Lincoln. In this continuity, Robbie and Lonnie accidentally threw a basketball through a grocery store window and the former abandoned the latter when the police arrived, leading to Lonnie's arrest. Years later, Robbie got a job at a local newspaper and investigated a chemical plant, where he re-encountered Lonnie, who had become a criminal. Lonnie attempts to have Robbie arrested, but falls into a chemical vat and is presumed dead. Deciding to atone for his past, Robbie stays behind to explain what happened to the police, who let him go. By the time he joined the Daily Bugle, he is horrified to discover his son Randy has joined a gang led by Lonnie, now operating as Tombstone. With Spider-Man's help, Robbie has Tombstone arrested and saves Randy.
  - An alternate reality version of Robbie who went on to share Jameson's enmity for Spider-Man (due to this version getting possessed by the Carnage symbiote) appears in the episode "I Really, Really Hate Clones".
- Robbie Robertson appears in The Spectacular Spider-Man, voiced by Phil LaMarr.
- Robbie Robertson appears in The Avengers: Earth's Mightiest Heroes episode "Along Came a Spider", voiced by Troy Baker.
- Robbie Robertson appears in the Spider-Man (2017) episode "Screwball Live", voiced by Ernie Hudson.
- The Marvel Noir incarnation of Robbie Robertson appears in Spider-Noir, portrayed by Lamorne Morris. This version is a longtime friend of Ben Reilly and was the first to find out he was "the Spider". After being fired from the Daily Bugle following Ben's retirement, Robbie eventually gets his job back by reporting on the veteran superhumans arising in New York. He later decides to quit after bonding with one of the superhumans, Lonnie Lincoln, and seeing the paper edit his articles to characterize the veterans as monsters, instead becoming the editor-in-chief for the Harlem Herald.

=== Film ===
- Robbie Robertson appears in Sam Raimi's Spider-Man film trilogy, portrayed by Bill Nunn.
- Robbie Robertson was included in the original script for The Amazing Spider-Man 2. However, he was cut from the final screenplay.

=== Video games ===
- Robbie Robertson appears in Spider-Man 2, voiced by Jeff Coopwood.
- Robbie Robertson appears in Spider-Man 3, voiced by Charlie Robinson.
- Robbie Robertson appears in Marvel Super Heroes vs. Street Fighter's "TV Studio" stage if Spider-Man is fighting in it.
- Robbie Robertson appears in Spider-Man's ending for Marvel vs. Capcom 3: Fate of Two Worlds.
- Robbie Robertson appears in Marvel's Spider-Man 2. This version works for the New York Bulletin.
