= List of video games featuring Spider-Man =

Numerous video games featuring the Marvel Comics superhero Spider-Man have been released. Spider-Man has appeared on over fifteen gaming platforms, including apps on mobile phones.

== Overview ==
Overview of Spider-Man video games
Title	Release	Platforms	Developer	Publisher
Spider-Man	1982	Atari 2600, Odyssey 2		Parker Brothers
Questprobe featuring Spider-Man	1984	Amstrad CPC, Apple II, C64, C16, Atari 8-bit, ZX Spectrum, IBM PC compatible	Adventure International	Adventure International
The Amazing Spider-Man and Captain America in Dr. Doom's Revenge!	1989	MS-DOS, Amiga, Atari ST, Amstrad CPC, ZX Spectrum, C-64	Paragon	Medallist
The Revenge of Shinobi	1989	Genesis, Sega CD	Sega	Sega
The Amazing Spider-Man	1990	Amiga, MS-DOS, C-64, Atari ST	Oxford Digital Enterprises	Paragon
The Amazing Spider-Man	1990	Game Boy	Rare	LJN/Nintendo
The Punisher: The Ultimate Payback!	1991	Game Boy	Krome Studios Melbourne	Acclaim Entertainment
Spider-Man vs. The Kingpin	1991	Genesis, Master System, Game Gear, Sega CD	Technopop	Sega
Spider-Man: The Video Game	1991	Arcade	Sega	Sega
The Amazing Spider-Man 2	1992	Game Boy	Bits Studios	LJN
Spider-Man: Return of the Sinister Six	1992	NES, Master System, Game Gear	Bits Studios	LJN/Flying Edge
Spider-Man and the X-Men in Arcade's Revenge	1992	Super NES, Genesis, Game Gear, Game Boy	Software Creations	LJN/Flying Edge
The Amazing Spider-Man 3: Invasion of the Spider-Slayers	1993	Game Boy	Bits Studios	LJN
Spider-Man and Venom: Maximum Carnage	1994	Super NES, Genesis	Software Creations	LJN
The Amazing Spider-Man: Lethal Foes	1995	Super Famicom	Argent, Epoch	Epoch
Venom/Spider-Man: Separation Anxiety	1995	Super NES, Genesis	Software Creations	Acclaim Entertainment
Spider-Man	1995	Super NES, Genesis	Western Technologies	LJN/Acclaim Entertainment
The Amazing Spider-Man: Web of Fire	1996	32X	BlueSky Software	Sega
Spider-Man: The Sinister Six	1996	MS-DOS	Brooklyn Multimedia	Byron Preiss Multimedia
Spider-Man	2000	PlayStation, Game Boy Color, Nintendo 64, Dreamcast, Microsoft Windows	Neversoft / Vicarious Visions (GBC) / Edge of Reality (N64) / Treyarch (DC) / LTI Gray Matter (Win)	Activision
Spider-Man 2: The Sinister Six	2001	Game Boy Color	Torus Games	Activision
Spider-Man 2: Enter: Electro	2001	PlayStation	Vicarious Visions	Activision
Spider-Man: Mysterio's Menace	2001	Game Boy Advance	Vicarious Visions	Activision
Spider-Man	2002	Game Boy Advance, GameCube, Windows, PlayStation 2, Xbox	Treyarch / LTI Gray Matter (Win) / Digital Eclipse (GBA)	Activision
Spider-Man 2	2004	Game Boy Advance, GameCube, Windows, PlayStation 2, Xbox, N-Gage, Mac OS X, Nintendo DS, PlayStation Portable	Treyarch / Digital Eclipse (GBA, NGE) / Foundation 9 Entertainment (Win) / Aspyr (Mac) / Vicarious Visions (DS, PSP)	Activision
Ultimate Spider-Man	2005	Game Boy Advance, GameCube, Windows, PlayStation 2, Xbox, Nintendo DS	Treyarch / Beenox (Win) / Vicarious Visions (DS, GBA)	Activision
Spider-Man: Battle for New York	2006	Nintendo DS, Game Boy Advance, Mobile	Torus Games	Activision
Spider-Man 3	2007	Game Boy Advance, Windows, Nintendo DS, PlayStation 2, Wii, Xbox 360, PlayStation 3, PlayStation Portable	Vicarious Visions / Treyarch (X360, PS3) / Beenox (Win)	Activision
Spider-Man: Friend or Foe	2007	Windows, Nintendo DS, PlayStation 2, Wii, Xbox 360, PlayStation Portable	Next Level Games / Beenox (Win) / Behaviour Interactive (DS, PSP)	Activision
Spider-Man: Web of Shadows	2008	Windows, Nintendo DS, PlayStation 2, PlayStation 3, PlayStation Portable, Wii, Xbox 360	Shaba Games and Treyarch / Griptonite Games (DS) / Amaze Entertainment (PS2, PSP)	Activision
Spider-Man: Toxic City	2009	Mobile	Gameloft	Marvel Comics
Ultimate Spider-Man: Total Mayhem	2010	iOS, Android	Gameloft	Gameloft
Spider-Man: Shattered Dimensions	2010	Nintendo DS, PlayStation 3, Wii, Xbox 360, Windows	Beenox / Griptonite Games (DS)	Activision
Spider-Man: Edge of Time	2011	Nintendo 3DS, Nintendo DS, PlayStation 3, Wii, Xbox 360	Beenox / Other Ocean Interactive (DS)	Activision
The Amazing Spider-Man	2012	Nintendo 3DS, Nintendo DS, PlayStation 3, Wii, Xbox 360, Android, iOS, Windows, Mobile, Wii U, Windows Phone, PlayStation Vita	Beenox / Other Ocean Interactive (DS) / Gameloft (AND, iOS, MOB, WP) / Mercenary Technology (Vita)	Activision
Spider-Man Ultimate Power	2014	Android, Mobile	Gameloft	Gameloft
Spider-Man Unlimited	2014	iOS, Android, Windows Phone	Gameloft	Gameloft
The Amazing Spider-Man 2	2014	Android, iOS, Windows, Nintendo 3DS, PlayStation 3, PlayStation 4, Wii U, Xbox 360, Xbox One	Beenox / Gameloft (AND, iOS) / High Voltage Software (3DS)	Activision
Marvel's Spider-Man	2018	PlayStation 4, PlayStation 5, Microsoft Windows	Insomniac Games	Sony Interactive Entertainment
Marvel's Spider-Man: Miles Morales	2020	PlayStation 4, PlayStation 5, Microsoft Windows	Insomniac Games	Sony Interactive Entertainment
Marvel's Spider-Man 2	2023	PlayStation 5, Microsoft Windows	Insomniac Games	Sony Interactive Entertainment

== 1980s ==
The Marvel Comics superhero Spider-Man was created by Stan Lee and Steve Ditko and first appeared in Amazing Fantasy #15 (August 1962).

By the late 1970s, Spider-Man had become a successful franchise. At this time the fictional character had already featured in the animated series Spider-Man, a segment on the children's television series The Electric Company (called Spidey Super Stories), and the live action prime time series The Amazing Spider-Man. As a result of the success, Marvel Comics licensed the character into a stream of electronic games.

=== Atari 2600 (1982) ===
In 1982, Parker Brothers published a game for the Atari 2600 (and its clone system, the Sears Video Arcade) titled Spider-Man. The action game involves climbing a skyscraper, capturing criminals and defusing bombs set by the Green Goblin. It supports two players.

The game is similar to the 1980 arcade video game Crazy Climber. It is a variation on its gameplay format, with added web shooting and swinging abilities.

=== Questprobe (1984) ===
In 1984, Scott Adams released the second in the Questprobe series of text adventure games. The second in the series was titled Questprobe: Spider-Man, and involved Spider-Man hunting for a series of gems at the behest of a mysterious character named the "Chief Examiner". The game was ported to the Commodore 64, Commodore 16, Atari 8-bit computers, ZX Spectrum, IBM PC, Amstrad CPC, and the Apple II. This was a first-person-perspective graphical adventure game, with commands entered textually.

=== The Amazing Spider-Man and Captain America in Dr. Doom's Revenge! & The Revenge of Shinobi (1989) ===
In 1989, The Amazing Spider-Man and Captain America in Dr. Doom's Revenge! was released for MS-DOS, Amiga, Atari ST, Amstrad CPC, ZX Spectrum, and Commodore 64. The game was written by Paragon Software Corporation, and published by Medallist (a subsidiary of MicroProse). The story of the game is told in a series of comic panels, with the game play similar to that of Street Fighter: The player, as either Captain America or Spider-Man, battles villains one-on-one until facing Doctor Doom.

In December 1989, The Revenge of Shinobi was released on the Mega Drive/Genesis. The game's boss battles feature comic book characters including Spider-Man and Batman, as well as famous movie characters, including Terminator and Godzilla, and even Rambo as normal-stage enemy. Initially, Spider-Man was included without consent from Marvel, but another version was released, this time with the copyright message shown in the beginning of the game, giving credit to Marvel, and editing the looks of Batman, Rambo and Godzilla, so avoiding a possible lawsuit; a Sega CD version was released, being derived from the altered version.

== 1990s ==
In the 1990s, comics enjoyed a boom, and the early 1990s saw a myriad of video games based on high-profile comic story lines and the 1994 Spider-Man: The Animated Series.

=== Home computers ===
The Amazing Spider-Man was the first game of the decade released, a puzzle oriented action game developed by Oxford Digital Enterprises and released in 1990 for the Amiga and ported to MS-DOS, Commodore 64, and Atari ST. The title was published by Paragon Software Corporation and features over 250 screens.

=== Game Boy ===
The Amazing Spider-Man, developed by Rareware and released in 1990 was the first in a trilogy for the newly introduced Game Boy. The game was published by LJN (a subsidiary of Acclaim), the first of a series of games published based on licensed Marvel characters. The game play involves running across New York chasing supervillains to locate Mary Jane Watson.

The Amazing Spider-Man 2 was developed by Bits Studios and released in 1992. The game is a side-scrolling beat-'em up. Spider-Man attempts to clear his name after he is accused of a crime committed by the Hobgoblin.

Spider-Man 3: Invasion of the Spider-Slayers, the third in the series, was released in 1993 by Bits Studios.

The Punisher: The Ultimate Payback! by Australian company Beam Software was released in 1991 for the Game Boy. The game is much like Operation Wolf, with the Punisher shooting villains while protecting the innocent. Spider-Man appears between the action to offer advice on how to beat upcoming levels and swings in to rescue hostages once their captors have been shot.

=== Games for the Sega family of consoles ===
The Amazing Spider-Man vs. The Kingpin, developed and published by Sega and released in 1990, was the first game featuring Spider-Man on Sega consoles. The game premiered on the Master System and Genesis in 1991, followed by the Game Gear in 1992, and to the Sega CD in 1993. Fundamentally, the game is the same on each platform with each iteration including new levels, enhanced graphics and a few incremental improvements to the game play. The story involves Spider-Man trying to collect six keys from six villains to defuse a bomb in New York planted by the Kingpin. Spider-Man has a finite supply of web fluid and the only way to replenish is to take photos, most profitably of the supervillains, to sell to the Daily Bugle.

Spider-Man: The Video Game was released in 1991 for coin-operated arcades. Developed by Sega on Sega System 32 hardware, the game is a four-player, platform beat-'em-up similar to Data East's Captain America and the Avengers released the same year. The player plays as Spider-Man, Black Cat, Namor the Sub-Mariner, or Hawkeye, with the game divided into four acts.

The NES game, Spider-Man: Return of the Sinister Six

=== Nintendo Entertainment System ===
Spider-Man: Return of the Sinister Six, developed by B.I.T.S. and released in 1992 for the Nintendo Entertainment System, is the first game featuring Spider-Man on the NES. It is an action platform game that involves Spider-Man swinging across various levels to defeat each one of the Sinister Six; Electro, Sandman, Mysterio, Hobgoblin, Vulture and Doctor Octopus. Ports to the Master System and Game Gear followed in 1993.

=== Genesis and Super NES ===
Spider-Man/X-Men: Arcade's Revenge, the first Spider-Man cross platform game, was released on the Super Nintendo Entertainment System and Sega Genesis. It was first developed for the Super NES in 1992 by Software Creations (who went on to produce several games for Marvel) and published by LJN. The game was later ported to the Genesis in 1993. The game involves rescuing four of the mutant superhero X-Men (Wolverine, Cyclops, Storm, Gambit) from an assassin named Arcade. The player must navigate Spider-Man in search of the captured heroes (who join Spider-Man when found), fighting a variety of super villains. Software Creations later adapted the game to the Game Boy in 1993 and to Game Gear in 1994.

Spider-Man and Venom: Maximum Carnage, released on Super NES and Genesis in 1994, was the first one of two major Marvel comic book storyline adaptations by Software Creations. Venom/Spider-Man: Separation Anxiety released in 1995 for Super NES, Genesis and PC was the sequel. Both games are side scrolling beat-'em up action games where the player controls either Spider-Man or Venom, fighting various villains from the comic book plotlines.

Spider-Man from 1995, was developed by Western Technologies and published by Acclaim on the Genesis, and by LJN on the Super NES. It marked the beginning of a range of software incorporating elements from the Spider-Man cartoon. The game is a side scrolling action platformer. The Super NES game features six levels, five bosses, and fourteen sub-bosses. The Genesis game features five levels, five bosses, and thirteen sub-bosses. The game also features the Fantastic Four.

=== Super Famicom ===
The Amazing Spider-Man: Lethal Foes was released in 1995 for the Super Famicom exclusively in Japan, very loosely based on the mini-series The Lethal Foes of Spider-Man.

=== Tiger's LCD games ===
Over the years Tiger Electronics released several handheld LCD Spider-Man games.

=== Spider-Man Cartoon Maker ===
Spider-Man Cartoon Maker, released in 1995 by Knowledge Adventure, is a software package that allowed the user to create films by utilizing an archive of backdrops, animations and props from the Spider-Man animated series. The game featured the voice of Christopher Daniel Barnes, who played Spider-Man in the series.

=== Marvel CD-ROM Comics featuring Spider-Man ===
That same year Marvel attempted to release classic comic books onto CD-ROM. Only four were ever produced, based on Spider-Man, the X-Men, Iron Man and the Fantastic Four. The Spider-Man one titled, Marvel CD-ROM Comics featuring Spider-Man included animation from the series, trivia games, and four complete issues of the comic narrated by Christopher Daniel Barnes.

=== Capcom's arcade fighting games ===
Marvel Super Heroes for the CPS II arcade hardware was a result of the success of Capcom's fighting game X-Men: Children of the Atom. It was developed by Capcom, released in 1995, ported to Sega Saturn, PlayStation and MS-DOS and features Spider-Man as a playable character.

Marvel Super Heroes: War of the Gems, an unrelated action game, was released for the Super NES in 1996. The game involves utilizing each of the Marvel superheroes through each of their levels to collect one of the Gems needed to complete the game. The game features Iron Man, Captain America, Hulk, Wolverine, and Spider-Man.

After Children of the Atom and Marvel Super Heroes, a partnership between Marvel and Capcom began, combining the two universes into the Marvel vs. Capcom fighting game series. Spider-Man would appear as a playable character in several titles:

- Marvel Super Heroes (1995) (voiced by Patrick Chilvers)
- Marvel Super Heroes vs. Street Fighter (1997)
- Marvel vs. Capcom: Clash of Super Heroes (1998)
- Marvel vs. Capcom 2: New Age of Heroes (2000)

Venom also appears as a playable character in the latter two games. Spider-Man later returns in Marvel vs. Capcom 3: Fate of Two Worlds.

This version of Spider-Man was seemingly killed by Morlun during the events of Spider-Verse.

=== The Amazing Spider-Man: Web of Fire ===
Spider-Man: Web of Fire was developed by BlueSky Software and Zono in 1996 and published by Sega for the Sega 32X, as one of the final titles for the add-on. The game is a platform action game similar to the previous Sega title, Spider-Man vs. The Kingpin. This time Spider-Man teams up with Daredevil to prevent the invading forces of HYDRA from taking over New York City. The game is broken into six levels with bosses such as the Eel, Tangle, and the Super-Adaptoid.

=== Spider-Man: The Sinister Six ===
Spider-Man: The Sinister Six, developed by Brooklyn Multimedia was an adventure game for the PC. The game was released in 1996 and published by Byron Preiss Multimedia. The game allowed the user to choose the path the narrative would take, interact with characters as Peter Parker, collect items, and confront various puzzles, boss battles, and mini games. In the game, Spider-Man is voiced by Buster Maxwell.

=== Marvel Creativity Center ===
Marvel Creativity Center, released in 1997 for both PC and Apple Mac by Cloud 9 Interactive, teaches the user how to create comics, the 'Marvel Way' with Stan Lee and Spider-Man acting as guides. The "story" involves Marvel studios being infiltrated by a mystery villain who has broken contact with all the regular Marvel artists and writers, leaving it up to the user to plot, script, illustrate and letter a comic.

== 2000s ==
Throughout the late 1990s, Marvel Comics suffered an industry slump with Marvel filing for bankruptcy, which explains the lack of Spider-Man games towards the end of the late 1990s. However, by 2000, Marvel was profitable again and was gearing up to drop the Comics Code Authority and established its own rating system. They began seriously licensing its characters for major feature film adaptations (with the commercially successful X-Men film premiering on July 14, 2000). By the late 2000s, new Spider-Man games were in the works, being published by Activision, until January 2, 2014, when the license expired.

=== Early PlayStation and Game Boy Color games ===
As a symbolic gesture of Marvel's return the development of two separate Spider-Man titles for PlayStation and Game Boy Color were announced. Neversoft's PlayStation iteration was highly successful. Enhanced versions were ported by other developers to the Nintendo 64 in 2000 and PC CD-ROM and the Dreamcast in 2001. A sequel, Spider-Man 2: Enter Electro was released in 2001 for the PlayStation and developed by Vicarious Visions. In those two games, Spider-Man was voiced by Rino Romano.

A sequel to the Game Boy Color version, Spider-Man 2: The Sinister Six was also released in 2001 and was developed by Torus Games.

The PlayStation Spider-Man utilized the same engine as Tony Hawk's Pro Skater 2 (released September 2000) which was also developed by Neversoft. As an easter egg, developer Neversoft Entertainment included the ability to play as Spider-Man if the player achieved a high level of success in 'career mode'.

A standalone sequel to the first two games, Spider-Man: Mysterio's Menace, was released once again in 2001 and also developed by Vicarious Visions.

In September 2001, Spider-Man made a small cameo appearance as one of the fighters in the fighting game by Paradox Development, X-Men: Mutant Academy 2 for PlayStation.

In X2: Wolverine's Revenge, there was a deleted scene where Wolverine has his encounter with Spider-Man (again voiced by an uncredited Rino Romano) in a ruined town. When Wolverine states that Spider-Man is off his home turf, Spider-Man states that he heard about the big bust-out at the Void and rode on the Charter Bus to the ruined town with the other superheroes that can't fly or teleport. When Spider-Man asks Wolverine if he needs help fighting Magneto, Wolverine tells him to deal with the chaos in town until Damage Control arrives.

=== Film adaptation series (2002–2007) ===
==== Spider-Man: The Movie, Spider-Man 2 and Spider-Man 3 ====
As the live action Spider-Man movie was released in 2002, a game developed by Treyarch titled, Spider-Man: The Movie was developed for PC, PlayStation 2, Xbox, and GameCube with a separate title developed by Digital Eclipse Software for Game Boy Advance. The game play was similar to that of Neversoft's previous Spider-Man game, except it featured for the first time aerial combat, and to an extent allowed the user to 'web sling' over New York openly, although not being able to land on the ground below. The game sported the voice of the actors from the film, including Tobey Maguire, Willem Dafoe, and Bruce Campbell. Josh Keaton voices Harry Osborn, who is playable in his own bonus storyline, where he dons his father's Green Goblin gear after his death and investigates a conspiracy involving Oscorp.

After the critical success of both the first Spider-Man film and the video game releases, Marvel ordered a wider selection of titles to coincide with the release of Spider-Man 2. The flagship titles being Treyarch's Spider-Man 2: The Game for PlayStation 2, Xbox, and GameCube, which extended the open environment concept started by their previous title. Unlike the previous generation of games based on the film, Treyarch's game was not released for the PC, and in its stead was an original game developed by Fizz Factor. The reasons for this remain unclear, and Fizz Factors game did not include the open environment game play as seen in Treyarch's game and appeared to be targeted towards a younger audience, despite the game being marketed the same as the console release. Later, in 2005, another version of Spider-Man 2, this time for Sony's new handheld, the PlayStation Portable; which debuted in the first quarter of the year along with the system, was released. The PSP version of Spider-Man 2 was the first action game for the PSP. This version includes an exclusive character, Vulture. The PlayStation, Xbox and GameCube version got high critical acclaim and is often the basis for comparison for other Spider-Man video games.

In 2007 Spider-Man 3 was released for PlayStation 3, Xbox 360, Wii, Microsoft Windows, PlayStation 2, PSP, GBA, and Nintendo DS, based on the film of the same name. It's very similar to its predecessor in terms of gameplay, and loosely follows the plot of the film, while featuring new secondary storylines with characters not seen in the film. The game introduces the symbiote black suit, which enhances Spider-Man's powers, and the next-gen version also features the New Goblin as a playable character in the final mission of the game; he was later added as DLC for the PlayStation 3 and Xbox 360 versions. The next-gen version of the game was developed by Treyarch, the other console version was developed by Vicarious Visions, and the PC version by Beenox. In 2007, two Spider-Man 3 games were released for mobile devices, developed by Javaground USA and produced by Sony Online Entertainment. Spider-Man 3 Action was released early in the year, followed by Spider-Man 3 Puzzle a few months later.

==== Spider-Man: Friend or Foe ====
Spider-Man: Friend or Foe was released on October 2, 2007, for Xbox 360, Wii, PlayStation 2, PC, PSP and Nintendo DS where James Arnold Taylor reprised his role of Spider-Man. The game borrows inspiration from the Spider-Man film trilogy in terms of character designs, and also features characters from outside the films. It is a linear beat 'em up game, where Spider-Man teams up with various villains and heroes to stop a symbiote invasion orchestrated by Mysterio. The game can be played by two players, with one controlling Spider-Man and the other one of his allies.

==== Cast and characters ====
Character	Film adaptation series			
Character	Spider-Man	Spider-Man 2	Spider-Man 3	Spider-Man: Friend or Foe
Character	2002	2004	2007	2007
Peter Parker Spider-Man	Tobey Maguire	Tobey Maguire	Tobey Maguire	James Arnold Taylor
CHARACTERS FROM THE SAM RAIMI TRILOGY
Dennis "Spike" Carradine	Dan Gilvezan			
Bonesaw McGraw	Jay Gordon			
J. Jonah Jameson	Jay Gordon	Jay Gordon	J. K. Simmons	
Harry Osborn New Goblin	Josh Keaton	Josh Keaton	James Franco	Josh Keaton
Norman Osborn Green Goblin	Willem Dafoe			Roger L. Jackson
Ben Parker	Peter Lurie			
Mendel Stromm	Peter Lurie			
Mary Jane Watson	Cat O'Conner	Kirsten Dunst	Kari Wahlgren	
Mr. Aziz		Keith Szarabajka		
Betty Brant		Bethany Rhoades	Rachel Kimsey	
Curt Connors The Lizard		Joe Alaskey (Treyarch versions only)	Nathan Carlson	Roger L. Jackson
John Jameson		Charles Klausmeyer		
Otto Octavius Doctor Octopus		Alfred Molina		Joe Alaskey
May Parker		Mindy Sterling		
Robbie Robertson		Jeff Coopwood	Charlie Robinson	
Eddie Brock Venom			Topher Grace	Quinton Flynn
Flint Marko Sandman			Thomas Haden Church	Fred Tatasciore
CHARACTERS IN THE GAMES ONLY
Mac Gargan Scorpion	Mike McColl		Dee Bradley Baker	Fred Tatasciore
Sergei Kravinoff Kraven the Hunter	Peter Lurie (Xbox & PC versions only)		Neil Kaplan	
The Narrator	Bruce Campbell	Bruce Campbell	Bruce Campbell	
Herman Schultz Shocker	Michael Beattie	Michael Beattie		
Adrian Toomes Vulture	Dwight Schultz	Dwight Schultz (PSP version only)		
Quentin Beck Mysterio		James Arnold Taylor		Robin Atkin Downes
Calypso Ezili		Angela V. Shelton	Angela V. Shelton	
Thomas Fireheart Puma		Dee Bradley Baker (PC version only)		
Felicia Hardy Black Cat		Holly Fields		Audrey Wasilewski
Alex O'Hirn Rhino		John DiMaggio	Steve Blum	John DiMaggio
Luke Carlyle			Neil Ross	
Jean DeWolff			Vanessa Marshall	
Wilson Fisk Kingpin			Bob Joles	
Michael Morbius			Sean Donnellan (Wii, PS2 and PSP versions)	
Shriek			Courtenay Taylor (Wii, PS2 and PSP versions)	
Farley Stillwell			Nika Futterman	
Blade				Khary Payton
Nick Fury				Marc Graue
Hobie Brown Prowler				Chris Gardner
Max Dillion Electro				David Kaye (PSP version only)
Danny Rand Iron Fist				John Rubinow
Silver Sable				Jennifer Hale (Microsoft Windows version only)

=== Sony Pictures Mobile games ===
Sony Pictures Mobile released a Spider-Man game for wireless phone in 2003. The game was such a success that a number of titles were planned to be released alongside the Spider-Man 2 film. Some titles were delayed and are slowly being released. Current titles include; Spider-Man vs. Doc Ock (May 2004) (a multi-level action-adventure game where Spider-Man battles Doc Ock), Spider-Man 2 Pinball (May 2004) (virtual pinball game, themed with Spider-Man & Doc Ock characters), Spider-Man 2 3D: NY Subway (April 2005) (the player acts as Spider-Man as he leaps, swings and soars through the city, defeating thugs and ultimately facing off with Doc Ock. The 3D games feature superior graphics and sound and showcase the advanced capabilities of new mobile handsets) and Spider-Man 2 Text Messaging Games (players must show their knowledge of Spider-Man trivia and navigate through a mission-based text game). Other hand handheld versions developed appeared on the Nintendo DS and Game Boy Advance by Vicarious Visions and N-Gage by Backbone Entertainment.

=== JakksTVGames ===
In November 2004, in time for Christmas JakksTVGames released an all inclusive controller that includes an ATV input jack, to operate as a console plugged straight into a TV. It was titled Spider-Man Controller with 5 TV Games, and as the name suggests includes five original video games each with a different goal; Streets of the City, Spider Training, Venom's Vindication, Escape from the Sewers, and Vulture's Venture.

=== Micro Games of America ===
Additionally, Micro Games of America towards the end of 2004 released a portable LCD game, titled Spider-Man 2. Sony Pictures has also released, their own LCD game, titled Spider-Man 2 Hand Held Game and a virtual reality head set portable game titled, Spider-Man 2 VR 3D.

=== Spider-Man & Friends ===
As 2005 began, Activision released Spider-Man & Friends for PC. It was developed by their internal company, Activision Value and targeted towards young children. It featured action game based gameplay with various puzzles used as a learning tool. In March, Activision Value released their second title based on the Spider-Man franchise, Spider-Man Print Studio. The software allows the user to print various calendars, posters, bookmarks, flyers, door hangers, and masks from a library of pre-existing Spider-Man themed art, with Spider-Man as a guide to show the user the software. This game also appeared on the Vtech, V.Smile educational console.

=== Ultimate Spider-Man ===
The Ultimate Marvel iteration of Spider-Man is featured in Ultimate Spider-Man, voiced by Sean Marquette. Based on the Ultimate Spider-Man comics, it was released on September 22, 2005, for the GameCube, Xbox, PlayStation 2, Nintendo DS, PC, Mobile Phones, and Game Boy Advance. Both Spider-Man and Venom are available as playable characters, each with their own storylines that cross over on multiple occasions. The game also introduces the new Comic Inking Animation technology, cel shading that makes the entire game appear as if it were a living comic-book. The writing and art design for Ultimate Spider-Man were done by Brian Michael Bendis and Mark Bagley, respectively, who both have worked on the comic book series of the same name since it was launched. The game's storyline also supposedly fits into the Ultimate Spider-Man comics, with issues 86 - 88 depicting the aftermath of the game's events. However, the issues did not entirely fit in with the game's story, and in fact had several continuity errors with the game (E.g. Silver Sable not knowing who Spider-Man is, despite encountering him multiple times in the game and even learning his secret identity).

=== Marvel Nemesis: Rise of the Imperfects ===
Also in September 2005, Marvel Nemesis: Rise of the Imperfects was released, which includes both Spider-Man (voiced by Alistair Abell) and Venom as playable characters. The game was released for GameCube, PlayStation 2, Xbox, PlayStation Portable and Nintendo DS.

A spiritual sequel to Marvel Nemesis was scheduled for release. A preview of the game was released containing a battle between Spider-Man and Doctor Doom, but due to the end of the partnership between EA and Marvel the game was cancelled.

=== Marvel: Ultimate Alliance ===
Spider-Man is a featured playable character in Marvel: Ultimate Alliance, voiced by Quinton Flynn. The Scarlet Spider is an alternate costume for Spider-Man outside of his Classic, Symbiote, and Stark Armor costumes. Outside of playable character status, he is seen in the cutscenes with Captain America, Thor, and Wolverine. Spider-Man has special dialogue with various characters ranging from Dark Spider-Man and Dark Thor, Black Widow, Henry Pym, Lizard, Lockjaw, Mysterio, Rhino, Scorpion, and Shocker. A simulation disk has Spider-Man defending Dum Dum Dugan from Scorpion while on the S.H.I.E.L.D. Omega Base. Spider-Man shows mock envy to his allies during mission briefings, making comments on S.H.I.E.L.D's advanced Hellicarrier and Omega base, Tony Stark's wealth, and the X-Men's relationship with the Shi'ar empire.

=== Spider-Man: Battle for New York ===
In 2006, Spider-Man: Battle for New York was released for the Nintendo DS and Game Boy Advance. Set in the Ultimate Marvel universe prior to the events of the Ultimate Spider-Man game, it features both Spider-Man and the Green Goblin as playable characters, with Spider-Man voiced by James Arnold Taylor.

=== Stern Pinball game ===
Stern Pinball has developed a Spider-Man pinball machine that encompasses all three Spider-Man theatrical releases, released in June 2007. This machine is designed by Steve Ritchie and programmed by Lyman Sheats.

=== Spider-Man: Web of Shadows ===
Spider-Man appears as the lead in Spider-Man: Web of Shadows, voiced by Mike Vaughn. In the game's storyline, Venom has successfully invaded Manhattan with a symbiote army, forcing Spider-Man to join forces with heroes and villains alike to defeat him. The game also features the black suit, which Spider-Man can take on and off at any time during gameplay, and morality choices that influence certain aspects of the story, including the ending of the game. Released on October 21, 2008, Web of Shadows has received positive reviews with critics praising the idea of an original story, but citing poor polish and execution. Three separate versions of the game were released: a 3D open world action game for PS3, Xbox 360, Wii and Microsoft Windows, a 2.5D side-scrolling beat 'em up for the PlayStation Portable and PlayStation 2 (called Amazing Allies Edition), and a 2.5D side-scrolling brawler/platformer for the Nintendo DS.

=== Marvel: Ultimate Alliance 2 ===
Spider-Man returns as a playable character in Marvel: Ultimate Alliance 2, voiced by Benjamin Diskin. In this game, he has the only alternate costume, which is entitled the Iron Spider. The game's plot is mainly based on the Secret War and Civil War story arcs from Marvel comics, with several new elements added. Early on in the story, players can choose to be either as a Pro- or Anti-Superhuman Registration Act, and both factions have their own branching narratives, which often cross over with each other. As such, Spider-Man can end up on either side of the conflict depending on the player's choices, which is reflective of the actual events of Civil War, where Spider-Man was originally supportive of the Act, but eventually defected to the Anti-Registration side in the process.

=== Marvel Super Hero Squad ===
Spider-Man appears as one of the playable heroes in the Marvel Super Hero Squad with Josh Keaton reprising the role. Regular, symbiote, and 2099 versions of Spider-Man are playable.

Spider-Man is also in Marvel Super Hero Squad: The Infinity Gauntlet, voiced again by Josh Keaton, and he appears in Marvel Super Hero Squad Online, voiced by Mikey Kelley.

== 2010s ==
=== Spider-Man: Shattered Dimensions (2010) ===
Four different versions of Spider-Man are playable in Spider-Man: Shattered Dimensions, a game from Activision and Beenox. Four different incarnations of Spider-Man, from the Amazing, Noir, 2099, and Ultimate universes, are featured in the game, voiced respectively by Neil Patrick Harris, Christopher Daniel Barnes, Dan Gilvezan, and Josh Keaton. It was released on September 7, 2010, to generally positive reviews. In the game's storyline, the Marvel multiverse is endangered after a powerful artifact called the Tablet of Order and Chaos is shattered by Spider-Man during a fight with Mysterio, forcing the four different versions of the web-slinger to retrieve the tablet fragments from the hands of various villains within their respective dimensions and save their realities. The game is notable for inspiring the 2014 comic book storyline, Spider-Verse.

=== Language Learning with Spider-Man ===
Spider-Man appears in Language Learning with Spider-Man, voiced by Jason Wood.

=== Ultimate Spider-Man: Total Mayhem ===
Spider-Man appears in Ultimate Spider-Man: Total Mayhem, voiced by Andrew Chaikin.

=== LittleBigPlanet ===
Spider-Man is available as downloadable content for the game LittleBigPlanet, as part of "Marvel Costume Kit 2".

=== Marvel vs. Capcom 3: Fate of Two Worlds ===
Spider-Man appeared as a playable character in the crossover fighting game Marvel vs. Capcom 3: Fate of Two Worlds. The character is once again voiced by Josh Keaton. He has the first four alternate color schemes: the classic red and blue costume, the black costume, the "Iron Spider", and the black and green suit from the recent "Big Time" storyline.

==== Ultimate Marvel vs. Capcom 3 ====
Spider-Man reprises his role as a playable character in Ultimate Marvel vs. Capcom 3, which is eventually an enhanced version of Marvel vs. Capcom 3: Fate of Two Worlds. He is once again voiced by Josh Keaton. His black and green outfit was now replaced with the black and red outfit from "Big Time" as well as the black and yellow Spider Armor suit. He additionally gains his white and black Future Foundation outfit, and his DLC costume is Ben Reilly's Scarlet Spider outfit.

=== Spider-Man: Edge of Time ===
Spider-Man: Edge of Time is a 2011 adventure game that was developed by Beenox and Activision. It is a sequel to Spider-Man: Shattered Dimensions, although it features only the Amazing Spider-Man, voiced by Josh Keaton, and Spider-Man 2099, voiced by Christopher Daniel Barnes, who combat a new threat across space and time as they attempt to save both of their realities.

=== The Amazing Spider-Man ===
The Amazing Spider-Man is a game based on the movie of same name that was released in 2012. It serves as an epilogue to the film, set several months later, and sees Spider-Man reluctantly joining forces with Curt Connors to find a cure for a deadly virus that originated from failed cross-species experiments created by Oscorp using Connor's research. The game was developed by Beenox and Activision, the same developers of Spider-Man: Shattered Dimensions and Spider-Man: Edge of Time. Sam Riegel voices Spider-Man, save for the iOS version, where he is voiced by Andrew Chaikin.

=== Marvel Avengers Alliance ===
Spider-Man is a playable character in the Facebook game, Marvel Avengers Alliance.

=== Marvel: Avengers Alliance Tactics ===
Spider-Man is a playable character in the Facebook game, Marvel: Avengers Alliance Tactics.

=== Marvel Avengers: Battle for Earth ===
Spider-Man appears as a playable character in the 2012 fighting game Marvel Avengers: Battle for Earth, voiced again by James Arnold Taylor.

=== Marvel Heroes ===
Spider-Man is a playable character in the MMORPG Marvel Heroes, voiced by Drake Bell reprising the role while Spider-Man wears his Modern costume, Christopher Daniel Barnes reprises his voice role while Spider-Man wears his Symbiote costume.

=== Lego Marvel's Avengers ===
Spider-Man appeared as a free DLC character in Lego Marvel's Avengers in both classic, his civilian identity and his separate Marvel Cinematic Universe's first appearance costume from Captain America: Civil War, bundled with Iron Spider, Ben Reilly version of Scarlet Spider, Ultimate Miles Morales and Ultimate version Spider-Woman.

=== Lego Marvel Super Heroes ===
Spider-Man is a playable character in Lego Marvel Super Heroes, voiced again by James Arnold Taylor. He serves as one of the main story characters in the game alongside the Avengers (consisting of Iron Man, Captain America, Hulk, Thor, Black Widow, Hawkeye), the X-Men (consisting of Angel, Beast, Cyclops, Iceman, Jean Grey, Wolverine, Storm, Colossus, Gambit, Charles Xavier, and Emma Frost), and the Fantastic Four.

=== The Amazing Spider-Man 2 ===
The Amazing Spider-Man 2 is a game loosely based on the film of the same name, developed by Beenox and was released in April 2014. Sam Riegel reprises his role as Spider-Man, while Yuri Lowenthal reprises the role in the iOS version. This was the last game published by Activision before the license expired, as well as the last major Spider-Man video game to be released for the Xbox and Nintendo platforms.

=== Marvel: Contest of Champions ===
Spider-Man is a playable character in Marvel: Contest of Champions. Spider-Man (Symbiote), Spider-Man (Stark Enhanced), Spider-Man (Stealth Suit), Miles Morales and Spider-Man 2099 also appear as separate playable characters.

=== Marvel Puzzle Quest ===
Spider-Man is one of the heroes in Marvel Puzzle Quest.

=== Spider-Man Unlimited ===
Spider-Man Unlimited, an endless runner mobile game developed by Gameloft, was released in September 2014 for iOS, Android, and Windows Phone. It features Spider-Man, along with his other alternative versions, as playable characters. Spider-Man is voiced by Yuri Lowenthal.

=== Disney Infinity 2.0 ===
Spider-Man is a playable character in the toys-to-life video game Disney Infinity 2.0, with Drake Bell reprising his voice role.

=== Marvel Mighty Heroes ===
Spider-Man was a playable character in Marvel Mighty Heroes, until the game was shut down only a year after its launch.

=== Marvel: Future Fight ===
Spider-Man is a playable character in the mobile game Marvel: Future Fight.

=== Marvel: Avengers Alliance 2 ===
Spider-Man is a playable character in the mobile game Marvel: Avengers Alliance 2.

=== Marvel Avengers Academy ===
Spider-Man is a playable character in the mobile game Marvel Avengers Academy.

=== Marvel vs. Capcom: Infinite ===
Spider-Man returns and appears as a playable character in Marvel vs. Capcom: Infinite with Robbie Daymond reprising his voice role from the 2017 Marvel's Spider-Man series. He was officially revealed at San Diego Comic-Con 2017, along with Frank West from the Dead Rising series, Mike Haggar from the Street Fighter series and the Nemesis from the Resident Evil series.

=== Marvel Strike Force ===
Spider-Man appears as a playable character in Marvel Strike Force. He is a City Brawler allied with the Web Warriors team. His default costume as Spider-Man is based on his classic outfit with influences from his costume in Spider-Man: Homecoming, while his alternate costume is based on the black and gold suit from Spider-Man: No Way Home. His Symbiote costume is a separate playable character, as are Miles Morales, Scarlet Spider, Ghost-Spider and Spider-Punk.

=== Lego Marvel Super Heroes 2 ===
Spider-Man appears as a playable character in Lego Marvel Super Heroes 2, voiced by Martin T. Sherman. This version's appearance is primarily based on the character's Marvel Cinematic Universe counterpart, with the homemade suit also appearing as an unlockable variant.

=== Marvel Battle Lines ===
Spider-Man appears in Marvel Battle Lines, voiced again by Robbie Daymond.

=== Marvel Powers United VR ===
Spider-Man appears in Marvel Powers United VR, voiced again by Robbie Daymond.

=== Marvel Ultimate Alliance 3: The Black Order ===
Spider-Man is featured as a playable character in Marvel Ultimate Alliance 3: The Black Order - voiced again by Yuri Lowenthal. The game was officially announced at The Game Awards 2018, and released on July 19, 2019, for the Nintendo Switch.

=== Marvel Super War ===
Spider-Man is a playable character in the mobile game Marvel Super War.

=== Marvel's Spider-Man series (2018–present) ===
==== Marvel's Spider-Man ====
In 2014, the license for developing console Spider-Man games was given to California-based studio Insomniac Games shortly after Marvel terminated their existing partnership with Activision in favor of pursuing a long-term publishing deal with Sony Interactive Entertainment, with whom the developer had closely collaborated with in the past. In 2018, Sony published Marvel's Spider-Man exclusively for PlayStation 4. The game's story features a wholly original interpretation of the Spider-Man mythos that draws from the decades-long comic book lore and the character's various appearances in other media, following an adult Peter Parker (voiced by Yuri Lowenthal) who has been active as Spider-Man for nearly eight years by the events of the game. After finally apprehending the infamous crime lord Wilson Fisk exposes a significant power vacuum within New York City's criminal underworld, Peter must confront the emerging Inner Demons gang led by philanthropist Martin Li, who secretly doubles as the superhuman Mister Negative, while dealing with the complications of his personal life such as his job as a research assistant to Dr. Otto Octavius, and his work at the local F.E.A.S.T. shelter assisting his aunt May, which intensifies his conflict with Li. The game released to significant critical and commercial success, releasing as one of the fastest selling games released in 2018, and eventually becoming both the best-selling game based on a comic book property, and the best-selling PlayStation 4 game in the console's lifespan. Praise was directed towards its combat and traversal mechanics, as well as its narrative and strong characterization, with particular acclaim directed towards its iteration of Peter Parker.

==== Marvel's Spider-Man: Miles Morales ====
The game's success led to further collaboration between Insomniac, PlayStation and Marvel. In November 2020, Sony published the spin-off title Marvel's Spider-Man: Miles Morales, which released on both PlayStation 4 and as a launch title for its successor, the PlayStation 5. The game acts as a narrative continuation, taking place over a year after its predecessor's conclusion and following the titular protagonist, who after training extensively under Peter Parker's supervision, is tasked with protecting the city as its sole Spider-Man while Parker and Mary Jane temporarily attend an excursion to the foreign nation of Symkaria on a trip concerning the latter's work in journalism. Morales' reputation as a hero is tested when he has to apprehend a rising street war between the corrupt Roxxon Energy Corporation and the terrorist group the Underground, led by the Tinkerer, which threatens to destroy his new home in Harlem. The game similarly enjoyed positive critical reception, with specific apprasial for the game's improved approach to side content, tighter story length, and Miles' unique abilities that set him apart from Peter as Spider-Man.

==== Marvel's Spider-Man 2 ====
Sony and Insomniac Games released Marvel's Spider-Man 2 in October 2023, acting as the sequel to Marvel's Spider-Man and a follow-up on events in Miles Morales. It focuses on Peter and Miles' continued difficulties navigating their dual lives and responsibilities to both their personal lives and to New York City as they battle an assemblage of villains, further complicated by the arrival of a mercenary group led by Kraven the Hunter which vows to hunt and kill them and other superpowered individuals, as well as the Venom symbiote, which bonds to Peter and begins to complicate his personal relationships. Yuri Lowenthal, Nadji Jeter and Laura Bailey return to headline the game's voice cast as Peter Parker, Miles Morales and Mary Jane Watson, and are joined by returning characters from the previous entries, and new cast members Jim Pirri as Kraven, as well as Tony Todd as Venom.

== 2020s ==
=== Marvel's Avengers ===
On August 3, 2020, Crystal Dynamics announced that Spider-Man would be added as a playable character in their Marvel's Avengers game via a free DLC, which released on November 30, 2021, exclusively for the PlayStation versions. The character is voiced by Sean Chiplock. This version of Peter Parker applied an internship at A.I.M. alongside Allan Chemicals’ heir, Liz Allan, following a tragedy of A-Day. During the internship, Peter and Liz discover A.I.M.’s shady operations, including the organization's co-operations with some of Spider-Man's rogues, such as Marx Raxton and Spencer Smythe. While Spider-Man joins the Avengers, Liz joins the Resistance. However, it is ultimately revealed that Raxton had been helping the heroes to uncover A.I.M.'s shady operations and expose them to the public. In the end, Raxton betrays Spencer and A.I.M., while receiving a reduced sentence for exposing their illegal activities.

=== Marvel Future Revolution ===
Spider-Man is a playable character in Marvel Future Revolution, voiced again by Yuri Lowenthal. Additionally, several alternate universe versions appear as NPCs, including one from the technologically advanced New Stark City and one who eventually made a deal with Mephisto which caused him the soul of Mary Jane Watson.

=== Fortnite Battle Royale ===
In December 2021, Spider-Man was added as a purchasable playable outfit in Fortnite Battle Royale's Chapter 3 Season 1 Battle Pass. Additionally, The Daily Bugle was added as a location on the Chapter 3 map. A new Mythic item called Spider-Man's Web Shooters was added, which lets the player wear Spider-Man's gloves and web swing. The Spider-Man outfit also had two additional unlockable styles based on his Symbiote and Future Foundation suits. Later in December, during the Winterfest Christmas event, the Marvel Cinematic Universe versions of Spider-Man and MJ appeared as purchasable outfits in the Item Shop, based on their appearances in Spider-Man: No Way Home. A Spider-Man: Brand New Day version of Spider-Man has also been added.

In January 2022, the Green Goblin was added as part of the game. In March 2022, a Mary Jane Watson outfit was released.

A Spider-Gwen outfit was added as part of the Chapter 3 Season 4 Battle Pass. Miles Morales and Spider-Man 2099 were added to tie into the release of Spider-Man: Across the Spider-Verse. The Web Shooters item returned for this crossover, this time based on Morales' suit from the film.

=== Marvel Snap ===
Various Spider-Man characters appear as collectible cards in Marvel Snap, developed by Second Dinner and published by Nuverse for iOS, Android and Windows. In addition to cards focused on primary and supporting characters, variant cards are available either as rare or super rare drops such as a pixelated Spider-Man and Symbiote Spider-Man, or sold in bundles and as part of the Season Pass such as Peter B. Parker's appearance in the animated Spider-Verse films, and the character's appearance in Marvel's Midnight Suns.

=== Marvel's Midnight Suns ===
Spider-Man features as a playable character in the tactical role-playing game Marvel's Midnight Suns developed by Firaxis Games and published by 2K, voiced again by Yuri Lowenthal. Venom also appears in both its regular form as a playable character, and a corrupted variant posing as a supporting villain serving under Lilith, voiced by Darin De Paul.

Marvel Rivals

Spider-Man appears as a playable character in the hero shooter Marvel Rivals, developed and published by NetEase Games. Spider-Man is a Duelist-class hero whose advantage is being able to reach mid-air positions for both offensive and defensive measures due to his mobility and web-swinging. His core gameplay entails attaching Spider-tracers onto his enemies to enable his abilities. His primary attack is a three-hit jab, while he has a secondary Cyber-Web Cluster projectile that dispatches his Spider-tracers while dealing damage, and a passive Spider-Sense that alerts other players in a team of nearby enemies.

=== Marvel Cosmic Invasion ===
Spider-Man (voiced again by Josh Keaton) is featured as a playable character in the game Marvel Cosmic Invasion, from developer Tribute Games and publisher Dotemu.

=== Marvel Tokon: Fighting Souls ===
Peter Parker / Spider-Man appears as a playable character in the fighting game Marvel Tokon: Fighting Souls, developed by Arc System Works and published by Sony Interactive Entertainment. He is voiced by Shinji Kawada in Japanese and by Josh Keaton in English. In the game's single-player story mode, the Promoter appoints Parker to lead a faction of heroes known as the Amazing Guardians who will be pitted against other heroes and villains in a bid to eventually face the Champion of the Universe. Parker's team also consists of Star-Lord, Kamala Khan / Ms. Marvel and Peni Parker / SP//dr. In addition, Green Goblin and Carnage also appear as fighters who are selected to become members of the Knights of Doom led by Doctor Doom. Eddie Brock / Venom will also be added to the roster during Season 1 as the third downloadable content (DLC) character in Spring 2027. J. Jonah Jameson and Mary Jane Watson make background appearances in the Marvel's New York stage, while Aunt May appears in the Amazing Guardians' campaign within the single-player Episode Mode.

== See also ==
- Marvel Games
- Spider-Man in other media
