= Spider-Man 2: The Sinister Six =

2001 video game

- North American box art
- Developer: Torus Games
- Publisher: Activision
- Series: Spider-Man
- Platform: Game Boy Color
- Release: NA: May 18, 2001; EU: June 15, 2001
- Genre: Platform
- Mode: Single-player

Spider-Man 2: The Sinister Six (or Spider-Man 2: Enter the Sinister Six in Europe) is a 2001 platform video game based on the Marvel Comics character Spider-Man. It was developed by Torus Games and published by Activision for the Game Boy Color. It was released on May 18, 2001, and is a sequel to Spider-Man (2000).

A canonical sequel to the first game, Spider-Man 2: Enter: Electro, was eventually released on October 19, 2001 as a PlayStation exclusive, followed by a standalone sequel, Spider-Man: Mysterio's Menace, released on September 19, 2001 for the Game Boy Advance.

== Gameplay ==
Spider-Man in the first level

The player controls Spider-Man through six side-scrolling levels, battling minor thugs and minions until defeating the villains in a boss fight at the end of each level. During gameplay, Spider-Man is able to jump, punch, kick, climb walls, and use his web shooters to web-swing or temporarily stun enemies. Each level involves completing a secondary objective before letting the player access the stage's boss encounter, such as finding keys to unlock doors or seeking out specific enemies who impede the player's progress.

== Plot ==
The plot of the game revolves around the kidnapping of Aunt May and Spider-Man's efforts to save her from the group of villains who call themselves the Sinister Six: Mysterio, Sandman, Vulture, Scorpion, Kraven, and the mastermind of the group's plans, Doctor Octopus.

Dr. Otto Octavius holds a meeting of the Sinister Six during the opening credits sequence of the game. Explaining his plot, Octavius instructs the Six to hunt down Peter Parker, Spider-Man's photographer, to send a message to their shared enemy. Upon reaching the Parker household, Sandman and Scorpion realize that Peter isn't home. In Peter's place, the pair kidnaps Peter's aunt, May Parker, and leave a message for Peter, instructing him to "tell Spidey to go to the Coney Island Pier".

Spider-Man fights through a variety of enemies who patrol the area's sewers and carnival attractions before encountering Mysterio and a number of his hologram duplicates. After his defeat, Mysterio disappears as he gleefully taunts Spider-Man about distracting him from his original task of heading to the pier. Spider-Man then makes his way to the pier, fighting several enemies and being forced to hunt for a key, which one of the nearby thugs possesses. After a brief battle with Sandman, the villain mumbles something about the Vulture being at the World Trade Center before passing out.

At the World Trade Center, Spider-Man must unlock a series of doors to access the roofs of the Twin Towers. Upon accessing the outside of the complex, Spider-Man is attacked by the Vulture, who drops a clue leading to Madison Square Garden.

Following the clue, Spider-Man battles Scorpion in the massive arena, who tells Peter to make his way to Central Park for his next challenge. Under the cover of a massive thunderstorm, Spider-Man pushes through zoo exhibits and more henchmen, eventually coming upon Kraven the Hunter. Never one to back away from a challenge, the sportsman engages in a fierce battle with Spider-Man, charging at him with his spear and throwing a variety of knives. Regretting the kidnapping because it lacks honor, Kraven recognizes his foe's fighting prowess and directs him to go to Empire State University for his sixth and final challenge.

In the penultimate stage of the game, the player must progress through the ESU campus, sneaking through lecture halls and classrooms to reach Dr. Octopus. Amidst bubbling vats of green liquid and enormous pieces of machinery, Spider-Man defeats Doctor Octopus. With the entire complex shaking as a result of the battle, the leader of the Sinister Six falls to the ground, swearing that one day, he will be victorious. In the epilogue, Peter thinks about getting May an unlisted address after escorting her home safely.

== Reception ==
Reception

Aggregate score
Aggregator	Score
GameRankings	70.29%

Review scores
Publication	Score
AllGame	3.5/5
GamePro	4.5/5
GameSpot	6.6/10
IGN	9/10

The game was met with mixed to positive reviews, as GameRankings gave it a score of 70.29%.
