= The Amazing Spider-Man (handheld video game) =

1990 video game

- North American cover art
- Developer: Rare
- Publishers: NA: LJN; EU: Nintendo
- Programmer: Chris Sutherland
- Composer: David Wise
- Series: Spider-Man
- Platform: Game Boy
- Release: NA: July 1990; EU: 1990
- Genres: Beat 'em up, action
- Mode: Single-player

The Amazing Spider-Man is a platform action video game released for the Nintendo Game Boy in 1990, published by LJN and developed by Rare, based on the Marvel Comics superhero Spider-Man.

== Gameplay ==
A typical left-to-right panning interlude between levels. Spider-Man is on the left and Scorpion on the right.

One of the wallcrawling sections

Spider-Man has three extra lives and three continues. The intermission scenes between each level feature Spider-Man trading catchy barbs with a supervillain on a cell phone or walkie-talkie to find out where he should go next.

Spider-Man can jump a normal and a double height. When he double-jumps, he can swing on a web. This can only be done for a short time until the web-meter runs out. Spider-Man's primary standing attack is a punch to the jaw. While crouching, Spider-Man can do a low, side kick. While jumping in the air, Spider-Man can do a side kick. While standing still, Spider-Man can shoot a glob of webbing from his wrists. This slightly depletes his web-meter.

In the two vertical levels, Spider-Man climbs up the side of a building, and will "buzz" with his spider sense, indicating that the player should move Spider-Man out of the way of possible falling objects.

Web vials are used to restore Spider-Man's web-meter, since his webbing is in limited supply. They are dropped by henchmen throughout the levels. Hamburgers restore some of Spider-Man's health meter.

== Plot ==
Spider-Man's most dangerous supervillains have discovered his secret identity, Peter Parker, and kidnapped his wife, Mary Jane. The action game takes the player through various city locations, battling an assortment of minor thugs, animals, and a supervillain (Mysterio, Hobgoblin, Scorpion, Rhino, Doctor Octopus, Venom) at the end of each level who, through intermission scenes, will taunt Spider-Man as to the whereabouts of his wife.

== Reception ==
Reception

Review score
Publication	Score
Electronic Gaming Monthly	8/10, 7/10, 7/10, 7/10

== Sequels ==
=== The Amazing Spider-Man 2 ===
Reception (The Amazing Spider-Man 2)

Review scores
Publication	Score
Consoles +	98%
GamePro	14.5/20
GameZone	58/100
Joystick	78%
Mega Fun	47/100
Nintendo Power	11.1/20
Video Games (DE)	55%
GB Action	80%
Power Play	44%

The Amazing Spider-Man 2 (released as Spider-Man 2 in North America) was developed by Bits Studios and published by Acclaim Entertainment and released in 1992. The game is different from the original game, in that along with its action-adventure theme, Spider-Man also has to collect various objects located in each level in order to solve puzzles.

The game's story follows a collection of supervillains (the Hobgoblin, Lizard, Graviton, Carnage, and Mysterio) who have framed Spider-Man for a bank robbery. He must survive several side scrolling levels, with themes such as cities and roller coasters, battling various thugs and supervillains in order to clear his name.

=== The Amazing Spider-Man 3: Invasion of the Spider-Slayers ===

The Amazing Spider-Man 3: Invasion of the Spider-Slayers (released as Spider-Man 3: Invasion of the Spider-Slayers in North America) was developed by Bits Studios and published by Acclaim Entertainment and released in 1993. The game is based loosely on the comic book storyline of the same name, with Spider-Man being attacked by an assortment of high-tech robot Spider-Slayers.

The player controls Spider-Man through various levels, fighting enemies and supervillains while solving various types of puzzles. The game features various enemies such as Electro, Scorpion, and ultimately the game's main antagonist Alistair Smythe.

== See also ==
- The Amazing Spider-Man (1990 video game)
- The Amazing Spider-Man (2012 video game)
