= Ultimate Spider-Man (video game) =

2005 video game

- North American PlayStation 2 cover art
- Developers: Treyarch (Note: Ported to Windows by Beenox.); Vicarious Visions (GBA, DS); Mforma (mobile)
- Publishers: Activision (Note: PlayStation 2, GameCube, and Nintendo DS versions released in Japan by Taito.); Mforma (mobile)
- Directors: Brian Michael Bendis, Chris Busse (PC, consoles)
- Designers: Brian Reed, Richard Bisso, Steve McNally (PC, consoles); Jonathan Mintz (GBA, DS)
- Programmers: Joseph Valenzuela (PC, consoles); Robert Trevellyan (GBA, DS)
- Artists: Chris Soares, Arnold Agraviador, Travis Eastepp, Jonathan Lauf, Manuel Salazar (PC, consoles)
- Composer: Kevin Manthei
- Series: Spider-Man
- Platforms: Game Boy Advance; GameCube; Windows; Nintendo DS; PlayStation 2; Xbox; Mobile phone
- Release: NA: September 22, 2005; AU: October 12, 2005; EU: October 14, 2005; Mobile: WW: November 30, 2005
- Genres: Action-adventure; Beat 'em up (handheld)
- Modes: Single-player, multiplayer (DS)

Ultimate Spider-Man is a 2005 action-adventure game based on the Marvel Comics character Spider-Man and the comic book of the same name. The game was published by Activision for the Windows, GameCube, PlayStation 2, Xbox, Nintendo DS, and Game Boy Advance platforms. The PlayStation 2, GameCube and Xbox versions were developed by Treyarch, with the Windows version being a port of that version by Beenox. These versions are drastically different from the handheld versions, which were developed by Vicarious Visions. A version for mobile phones was also developed and published by Mforma. A Limited Edition of the game was released for the PlayStation 2, and includes additional material such as a "making of" documentary and an interview with Spider-Man co-creator Stan Lee.

Like Treyarch's previous Spider-Man title, Spider-Man 2, the game incorporates an open world design, allowing players to freely explore fictitious representations of Manhattan and Queens when not completing main missions to advance the narrative. One notable feature exclusive to this game is the ability to play as both Spider-Man and Venom, who control differently and have exclusive storylines, which cross over with each other. The game's storyline is set within the Ultimate Marvel universe, three months after the Venom story arc from the Ultimate Spider-Man comics, and centers on Spider-Man's investigation of the company Trask Industries and their connection to both the creation of the Venom symbiote and the deaths of his parents. Meanwhile, Venom must avoid constant capture attempts by Bolivar Trask, who wants to recreate the symbiote's capabilities.

Ultimate Spider-Man received generally positive reviews from critics across all platforms, and is retrospectively regarded as one of the best Spider-Man games ever made. A prequel, Spider-Man: Battle for New York, developed by Torus Games, was released in November 2006 for the Game Boy Advance and Nintendo DS. Treyarch's next Spider-Man game, Spider-Man 3, was released in May 2007.

== Gameplay ==
=== Console & PC version ===
In Ultimate Spider-Man the player can experience a free-roaming city environment that covers Manhattan and Queens. The player starts in story-mode where the game automatically switches between Spider-Man and Venom at set points. Spider-Man travels by web swinging, and attacks using acrobatic attacks, and can restore health lost in combat by red health pick-ups dropped by defeated enemies. Venom travels by using his tentacles to pull himself and by performing massive jumps. Venom attacks using his claws and tentacles, can also throw cars at targets. Due to Eddie Brock's incomplete control over the symbiote transformation leading to insatiable hunger, Venom's health gauge is initially impermanent and drains over time. As his gameplay sections do not feature health pick-ups as Spider-Man's do, Venom must replenish his health by feeding on people. When playing as either character, the player must manually aim and shoot a web at an actual building to swing, much like its previous game, Spider-Man 2.

As the game progresses, Parker/Spider-Man and the player will have certain City Goals to accomplish in order to continue the storyline or can simply roam the open world city.

There are additional activities throughout the game such as finding secret tokens, landmark tokens, comic book covers and competing in trick races.

==== City goals ====
A menu for the player to check out how many tokens they have collected, and how many combat tours, races and city events they have completed. It also tells the player what goals must be completed before the story can continue.

==== Message log ====
Every message that appears onscreen during gameplay appears here and is accessible through the pause menu.

==== Unlockables ====
This menu shows how many unlocked items and obtained collectibles the player has garnered through interacting with other non-playable characters, tokens collected, landmarks visited, etc. All unlockable items are viewed as a colored question mark and once unlocked is replaced by a picture.

=== Mobile phone version ===
The mobile phone version has 10 levels each one more difficult than the last. The player can choose to play as Venom or Spider-Man. Venom eats bystanders and defeats Spider-Man, while Spider-Man saves bystanders and defeats Venom. In the end Spider-Man battles Venom.

=== Game Boy Advance version ===
The Game Boy Advance version of Ultimate Spider-Man is a side-scrolling platformer, divided into seven "issues", each containing three chapters. The game allows players to control both Spider-Man and Venom. This version features only three main antagonists: Shocker, Silver Sable, and Carnage. Only Silver Sable and Carnage are fought, as Shocker is defeated by Silver Sable before Spider-Man finds him.

Unlike the Console, PC, or Nintendo DS games, this version features a limited supply of Spider-Man's web fluid contained in a blue gauge, consumed for both web-slinging and web-firing. Web-slinging does not require a solid surface to perform and moves Spider-Man forward a set distance. Web fluid which can be refilled by obtaining blue pick-ups scattered throughout levels, dropped by enemies, or as a reward from saved civilians. Venom retains his impermanent health and enemies can only be consumed after their health is depleted past a certain point, indicated by their health gauge turning purple.

Additionally, players may choose to collect hidden power-ups in each chapter to gain more web fluid capacity for Spider-Man, bolster Venom's non-draining health and feeding efficiency, or gain new moves and abilities for both Spider-Man and Venom.

=== Nintendo DS version ===
The Nintendo DS version of Ultimate Spider-Man is a side-scroller with a 3D environment. The game allows players to control Spider-Man and Venom.

The gameplay greatly differs between both characters:

- In Spider-Man levels, most of the game happens on the top screen and the touch screen is only used for selecting special attacks and operating certain objects (moving heavy objects, opening broken elevator door).
- In Venom levels, the game switches to the touch screen, enabling players to use Venom's tentacles to throw objects or enemies, and even attack by tapping the screen.

The game also features a multiplayer mode, where players can unlock different characters and arenas for a head-to-head fight.

== Plot ==
The game starts with a recap of what happened in the Venom storyline and Peter Parker's first fight with Venom before he disappeared, which had Peter and Venom fight from the high school football field on a rainy night and then the battle spans over to the middle of a street where Venom is believed to be killed by a downed, live power line in Peter's point of view.

Three months later, Peter Parker has resumed his normal life and has forgotten about Eddie, who is actually alive and has been feeding on people randomly in a nearby park. Eddie gets into a fight with Wolverine, who was the owner of a motorbike Venom threw through a bar.

After a fight with the R.H.I.N.O., Spider-Man gets his first foreshadowing of Eddie returning when his Spider-Sense overloads. That night, Silver Sable and her Wild Pack attack Venom who easily escapes. During a field trip to the Metropolitan Museum of Art, Peter gets his "Eddie headaches" again and fights his former friend on the roof. However, Venom is later captured by Silver Sable.

Kept imprisoned in an energy cage, Bolivar Trask and Adrian Toomes convince Eddie to test the suit for them as they knew Eddie and Peter's parents. His first test is going up against the recently escaped Electro where they fight over a knocked out Spider-Man in Times Square. S.H.I.E.L.D. interferes and Venom escapes, yet he goes back to Trask where he reveals to Silver Sable that Peter Parker is Spider-Man. He then transforms and is chased away by the Wild Pack.

Meanwhile, a Latverian mercenary who calls himself Beetle attacks New York by freeing the Green Goblin who Spider-Man defeats, and chasing Venom for a sample of the suit, yet Venom eventually defeats him. Silver Sable then fires a tranquilizer at Peter Parker and tries to bring him to Trask yet Peter awakens and they fight above the Queensboro Bridge before Venom appears and knocks Sable out. Spider-Man and Venom fight yet both go down due to Spider-Man knocking Eddie out and the tranquilizer that Silver Sable fired at Peter take effect.

Eddie awakens inside Trask Industries due to hearing Peter screaming as Toomes injected him with their own makeshift sample of the Venom suit, transforming him into Carnage. Venom then absorbs Carnage and spits Peter out again. With the combination of the Carnage suit and the leftover Venom samples in Peter's blood, Eddie believes he now has complete control over the suit (along with the white spider-symbol that appeared on Peter's version when he transformed). Trask finally gives Peter files on their parents yet takes them while trying to flee from an angry Venom yet he does not know how to fly the helicopter and his contract with Silver Sable has expired. Venom is eventually defeated but escapes.

As S.H.I.E.L.D. arrive, Peter reads the files and discovers that the reason for their parents' plane crash was due to Eddie Brock Sr. trying on the Venom suit onboard. There were only three survivors and one of the witnesses was Peter's mother, who died in the ambulance. Eddie is distraught that after all Trask made him do, all he got was three years in a golf course prison, so he transforms and kills him. Peter then confesses to Mary Jane Watson that he knows Eddie is alive and a prisoner in the suit.

=== Comparison with the comic ===
The game takes place three months after the events of the "Ultimate Venom" arc (Ultimate Spider-Man #33-38), and events within the game suggest the events of Ultimate Six have already passed, since the Green Goblin is found in a cryogenic cell and Sandman is in a vial. Electro is somehow free, despite having been apprehended by S.H.I.E.L.D. Kraven the Hunter's billboards can be seen around the city, which was mentioned in Ultimate Six. Eddie seems to have survived by lying low and staying away from Peter Parker, and picking off random victims to sustain his own existence.

At the time the game came out the most logical point for the game's story to take place between the Superstars and Hobgoblin arcs (between issues 71 and 72). A few months later Marvel.com advertised the Silver Sable arc as being the follow-up to the Ultimate Spider-Man video game. However in this arc not only are no parts of the game acknowledged, but Sable kidnaps Flash Thompson thinking he is Spider-Man. In the game Sable knows not only Peter Parker is Spider-Man, but kidnaps and fights him out of costume.

The Ultimate Spider-Man video game was adapted into the story arc, "War of the Symbiotes" (Ultimate Spider-Man #123-128). Events in this storyline happen in a different order, with some events, such as Peter's transformation into Carnage, being ignored. He is instead transformed into Venom and the Gwen Stacy version of Carnage is featured. It can be taken that the video game is now out of continuity.

== Reception and legacy ==
Reception

Aggregate score
Aggregator	Score
Metacritic	(DS) 78/100 (GBA) 62/100 (GC) 76/100 (PC) 75/100 (PS2) 74/100 (Xbox) 77/100

Review scores
Publication	Score
Edge	5/10
Eurogamer	6/10
Game Informer	8/10
GamePro	4/5
GameRevolution	C
GameSpot	7.1/10 (PC) 7/10
GameSpy	4/5 (PC) 3.5/5
GameTrailers	8.9/10
GameZone	(PS2) 8.4/10 (DS) 8.3/10 (GC) 8/10 (PC) 7.8/10 (Xbox) 7.4/10
IGN	8.4/10 (PS2) 8.3/10 (DS) 8/10
Nintendo Power	(GC) 9/10 (DS) 6.5/10 (GBA) 6/10
Official U.S. PlayStation Magazine	3.5/5
Official Xbox Magazine (US)	6.4/10
PC Gamer (US)	81%
CiN Weekly	88/100
The Sydney Morning Herald	3.5/5

Ultimate Spider-Man received "generally positive" and "mixed or average" reviews according to review aggregator Metacritic.

CiN Weekly gave it a score of 88 out of 100 and stated that "The true letdown... is that the master villains can still be supremely frustrating to defeat, requiring several replays and exhaustive bouts of highly patterned attacks". The New York Times gave it a positive-to-average review and said that the game was "very entertaining, and the addition of Nemesis creates some interesting new situations, but over all there isn't a lot of variety; you fight, you race, you ramble around the city, and then you do it all again". The Sydney Morning Herald gave it three-and-a-half stars out of five and stated that "combat against dim-witted goons can become repetitive but missions offer diversity".

During the 9th Annual Interactive Achievement Awards, Ultimate Spider-Man received a nomination for "Outstanding Achievement in Art Direction" by the Academy of Interactive Arts & Sciences.

Legacy

The premise of making a comic book-styled Spider-Man game led to inspire other games such as 2010's Spider-Man: Shattered Dimensions. The Ultimate Universe is one of its settings. A version of Ultimate Peter Parker is one of the protagonists, with Ultimate Electro and Carnage returning as bosses.

== Prequel ==
Spider-Man: Battle for New York, a side-scrolling beat 'em up where players can control both Spider-Man and the Green Goblin, was released for the Game Boy Advance and Nintendo DS on November 14, 2006. The game uses the same engine, and is also set in the Ultimate Marvel universe, serving as a prequel to the events of Ultimate Spider-Man.

== Canceled sequel ==
A sequel to Ultimate Spider-Man had entered development with a planned release date of December 2007; however, it was canceled before production began due to the original game failing to meet sales expectations, with Treyarch instead focusing on the Spider-Man 3 game.

The story was set to explore the family dynamic between Harry and Norman Osborn, with Ultimate Green Goblin being the second playable character and Harry turning into the Hobgoblin during the climax.

In 2021, some concept art was shared online by concept artist Ian Schofeld, and an early test animation was leaked online in 2025.
