= Green Goblin (Ultimate Marvel character) =

- Green Goblin as depicted in Ultimate Spider-Man #113 (November 2007). Art by Stuart Immonen.

Publication information
- Publisher: Marvel Comics
- First appearance: Ultimate Spider-Man #1 (September 2000)
- Created by: Brian Michael Bendis; Mark Bagley

In-story information
- Alter ego: Norman Virgil Osborn
- Species: Human mutate
- Place of origin: Ultimate Marvel (Earth-1610)
- Team affiliations: Oscorp; Sinister Six
- Notable aliases: Normie
- Abilities: Superhuman strength, speed, stamina, durability, agility and reflexes; Regenerative healing factor; Genius-level intellect; Pyrokinesis; Immortality

The Green Goblin (Norman Osborn) is a supervillain appearing in American comic books published by Marvel Comics. The character is the Ultimate Marvel version of Norman Osborn, and was rendered by artist Mark Bagley to resemble actor Brian Dennehy, as per writer Brian Michael Bendis's instructions.

== Fictional character biography ==
Norman Osborn is a corrupt industrialist and scientist who is trying to perfect the Super Soldier drug for S.H.I.E.L.D., an obsession that leads to the neglect of his wife Martha Osborn and son Harry Osborn. When an OZ-injected spider bites Peter Parker on a field trip, granting him superpowers, Norman attempts to recreate the events, transforming into a goblin-like monster who possesses superhuman physical abilities and pyrokinesis. In an attempt to destroy all evidence of his existence, the Green Goblin kills Martha, but Harry manages to escape. The next day, he attacks Harry's school, but is stopped by Spider-Man. During the fight, the Green Goblin plummets off a bridge into the river and is presumed dead.

However, Norman survives and has "evolved" in his words, being able to control his transformations. Due to overdosing on OZ, he suffers from hallucinations. These include seeing everything through a blood-red filter and creatures called "plasmids" tormenting him.

In the limited series Ultimate Six, Norman escapes from prison alongside Doctor Octopus, alongside Electro, Kraven the Hunter, and Sandman. Norman's Green Goblin form is shown to be more intelligent and no longer has hallucinations.

Norman is captured after several battles with Spider-Man and is kept in a high-security cell with other superhuman prisoners. When contacted by Carol Danvers, Norman transforms and escapes. As the Green Goblin, Norman confronts a group of S.H.I.E.L.D. troopers and kills Harry Osborn, who has assumed a similar Goblin form. Norman reverts to his human form and allows Danvers to kill him.

It is later revealed that Norman is still alive and being held custody by S.H.I.E.L.D until he escapes and confronts the new Spider-Man (Miles Morales). However, he is killed by Maria Hill.

Following the "Secret Wars" storyline, in which the multiverse was destroyed and recreated, the Green Goblin of Earth-1610 is resurrected.

== Powers and abilities ==
Green Goblin possesses similar abilities to his Earth-616 counterpart, including superhuman strength, durability, and agility. Additionally, he possesses pyrokinesis and a form of immortality, having resurrected and 'evolved' multiple times after being killed.

== In other media ==
=== Television ===
- The Ultimate Marvel incarnation of the Green Goblin serves as inspiration for two versions who appear in Ultimate Spider-Man (2012), both voiced by Steven Weber.
  - The "prime" incarnation sports the Ultimate Marvel incarnation's appearance and the original incarnation's use of a glider, pumpkin bombs, and electric gauntlets.
  - A different incarnation sports demonic wings and hails from an alternate reality where he killed his version of Peter Parker and fights Miles Morales.
- The Ultimate Marvel incarnation of the Green Goblin serves as inspiration for the Dark Goblin who appears in Spider-Man (2017), voiced by Josh Keaton. This version sports the Ultimate Marvel incarnation's monstrous appearance coupled with symbiote abilities and the original incarnation's use of a glider and pumpkin bombs.

=== Film ===
A version of the Green Goblin inspired by the Ultimate Marvel incarnation appears in Spider-Man: Into the Spider-Verse, voiced by Jorma Taccone. This version sports demonic wings and a tail, uses the original Green Goblin's Pumpkin Bombs, and works for the Kingpin. He is killed by the ensuing explosion of the Alchemax super collider.

=== Video games ===
- The Ultimate Marvel incarnation of the Green Goblin appears in Ultimate Spider-Man (2005), voiced by Peter Lurie.
- The Ultimate Marvel incarnation of the Green Goblin appears as a playable character in and the final boss of Spider-Man: Battle for New York, voiced by Neil Kaplan.
- The Ultimate Marvel incarnation of the Green Goblin appears as the final boss of Ultimate Spider-Man: Total Mayhem.
- The Ultimate Marvel incarnation of the Green Goblin, based on the Ultimate Spider-Man animated series incarnation, appears in Lego Marvel Super Heroes, voiced by John DiMaggio.
- The Ultimate Marvel incarnation of the Green Goblin, based on the Ultimate Spider-Man animated series incarnation, appears as a playable character and boss in Disney Infinity 2.0, voiced by Nolan North.
- The Ultimate Marvel incarnation of the Green Goblin appears as an alternate skin for the mainstream Green Goblin in Marvel: Future Fight.
