= Spider-Man: Battle for New York =

2006 video game

- North American DS cover art
- Developer: Torus Games
- Publisher: Activision
- Series: Spider-Man
- Engine: Vicarious Visions Alchemy
- Platforms: Game Boy Advance, Nintendo DS
- Release: NA: November 14, 2006; EU: December 1, 2006
- Genres: Action, platform
- Mode: Single-player

Spider-Man: Battle for New York is a 2006 action video game developed by Torus Games and published by Activision, and is a prequel to 2005's Ultimate Spider-Man, itself based on the comic book series of the same name. It was released for the Game Boy Advance and Nintendo DS on November 14, 2006. The game features Spider-Man and the Green Goblin as the main characters and is a re-imagining of their first encounter within the Ultimate universe. Battle for New York features the Green Goblin as a playable character. The cutscenes in the game are drawn by Marvel Comics artist Ron Lim.

== Plot ==
After finding out Spider-Man's true identity and how he gained his super powers, Norman Osborn tries to recreate the process on himself, thinking that his superior knowledge and access to his 'Oz Formula' would get a better result. He then turns himself into the Green Goblin (with a few side effects). Thinking his experiment to be a success, he then starts to use his formula on other people, creating a goblin army from the Kingpin's men. It's now up to Spider-Man to figure out what's going on and put a stop to the Goblin's plans before he can take over New York City.

Spider-Man ultimately thwarts the Goblin, who is then incarcerated by The Ultimates (the Ultimate Universe variants of The Avengers).

== Gameplay ==
Peter Parker/Spider-Man is the eponymous protagonist. Spidey's game play is almost identical to that of its predecessor, whereby he has to go around and save any civilians that are in trouble, engage in combat with thugs and (in the Nintendo DS version) take part in 3 touch screen mini-games: The stroke game, the web draw and the arm/disarm games.

Norman Osborn/Green Goblin is the main antagonist and a playable character. Green Goblin's game play is slightly different. Unlike Venom who could be controlled via the touch screen, the Goblin is controlled with the d-pad and face buttons only. His game play involves destroying objects and fighting security guards and S.H.I.E.L.D. agents. The Goblin does not take part in any touch screen mini-games.

Exclusive to the DS version, both Spider-Man and Goblin have access to 4 special moves which appear on the bottom screen, landing hits on opponents increases a special meter that, once full, will allow them to use one of the 4 moves available.

The player will also have to keep an eye out for the Threat Assessment Meter (or TAM for short); when it appears, it will point towards where Spidey and Goblin have to go next and also tell the player how much time they have left to solve the problem. If they fail to sort out the problem when the TAM meter runs out, the player will receive a game over.

== Reception ==
Reception

Aggregate score
Aggregator	Score
Metacritic	(DS) 68/100 (GBA) 41/100

Review scores
Publication	Score
1Up.com	C+
GameSpot	(DS) 7/10 (GBA) 4/10
GameZone	7.5/10
IGN	4.5/10
Nintendo Power	6/10
Nintendo World Report	6.5/10

Spider-Man: Battle for New York received "mixed or average" for the DS version and "generally unfavorable" reviews for the GBA according to review aggregator Metacritic.
