= Spider-Man 2: Enter: Electro =

2001 video game

- North American cover art
- Developer: Vicarious Visions
- Publisher: Activision
- Producer: Todd Quincey Jefferson
- Designer: Brent Boylen
- Programmers: Chris McEvoy; David Calvin; Dmitriy Buluchevskiy
- Artists: Yaming Di; Carl Schell
- Writers: Todd Quincey Jefferson; Brent Boylen; Marc Turndorf
- Composer: Todd Masten
- Series: Spider-Man
- Platform: PlayStation
- Release: NA: October 18, 2001; EU: October 26, 2001
- Genre: Action-adventure
- Mode: Single-player

Spider-Man 2: Enter: Electro (Note: Whilst often referred to as Enter Electro, the game's cover art and accompanying material includes a colon between Enter and Electro.) is a 2001 action-adventure video game based on the Marvel Comics character Spider-Man. It was developed by Vicarious Visions and published by Activision exclusively for the PlayStation. It is the sequel to Spider-Man (2000) and directly follows the events of the game, as Spider-Man attempts to thwart a criminal conspiracy orchestrated by Electro. Like its predecessor, the game features several Spider-Man villains as bosses, including the Shocker, Hammerhead, the Lizard, Sandman, and Electro, as well as his charged-up Hyper-Electro form, created exclusively for the game.

Enter: Electro received a mixed reception from critics; many of whom generally considered it a downgrade from its predecessor. The game has become notorious for having numerous details, including its entire final level, modified after the September 11 attacks; originally set to take place atop the World Trade Center, the setting was changed to a generic skyscraper following a release delay.

Enter: Electro was followed by Spider-Man for home video game consoles, based on the 2002 film and unrelated to the continuity of Enter: Electro or its predecessor. A standalone sequel for the Game Boy Advance, Spider-Man: Mysterio's Menace, was released in September 2001.

== Gameplay ==
One major difference between the game and its predecessor is the ability to play on ground levels. In the first game's outdoor levels, if Spider-Man swung too low below designated rooftops, he would fall into yellow mist that dominated most of the game's levels and die. Enter: Electro, however, presented levels based in limited city streets. They were confined grids rather than a free-roam environment.

The enemies in Enter: Electro are more realistic than the ones in the previous game, with the lizardmen and alien symbiotes being replaced by criminals, drones, and robots. In this game, Spider-Man has the ability to shoot a Web Ball while in mid-air. Spider-Man can also attach electricity and ice to his webbing. The training mode takes the player to the X-Men's Danger Room, wherein Rogue and Professor X assist Spider-Man with everything that may be useful during the course of gameplay. The hand animation is also changed; every character's hands can react instead of waving fists. The basic punch and kick combo moves are also changed, doing away with the two-handed uppercut/mule kick for the third strike. Spider-Man only has one jump animation in this game, with him having two in the predecessor. The game primarily features only four credited voice actors:

- Rino Romano as Spider-Man, Palooka, and Police Broadcast
- Jennifer Hale as Dr. Watts, Rogue, and Computer #2
- Dee Bradley Baker as Electro / Hyper-Electro, Beast, Hammerhead, Lizard / Dr. Curt Connors, Computer #3, and Thug
- Daran Norris as Beetle, Professor X, Sandman, Shocker, Thor, Public Address, and Thug

Additionally, Kathryn Fiore (Rino Romano's then-girlfriend) cameos as the voice of a computer. Stan Lee provides the opening narration, as in the previous game.

By completing certain in-game goals, new costumes can be unlocked for Spider-Man. Many of them have special powers to alter the game experience. Included are all the costumes from the first game, with the same abilities, as well as several new outfits. A new option called "Create-A-Spider" mode allows the player to apply up to three in-game powers to any unlocked costume. The game powers include enhanced strength, unlimited webbing and invincibility.

Two additional costumes designed by comic-book artists Alex Ross and Dave Williams were also featured in the game, based on their costume concept for the then-upcoming 2002 Spider-Man movie.

== Plot ==
Shortly after the events of Spider-Man, the Daily Bugle has given Captain America full credit for foiling "Doctor Octopus and Spider-Man's sinister plot" while stating that Spider-Man is "still at large". Spider-Man takes on some criminals while being watched by a visiting Beast.

A series of robberies led by Electro take place throughout New York City. While out on patrol, Spider-Man spots one of the robberies taking place at a building owned by BioTech. Planting a Spider-Tracer on the head thief's motorcycle, Spider-Man follows it to an abandoned warehouse where the thief is passing off a stolen briefcase to a contact. Spider-Man takes out the thugs and interrogates one of them, before being forced to fight the head thug: Shocker.

After defeating Shocker, Spider-Man follows the thug's tip and heads for an airfield, where the contact is going. Along the way, he is forced to disable a bomb, take out a machine-gun nest, and stop a runaway airplane from crashing. As the contact escapes via helicopter, Spider-Man plants another tracer on it and tracks it to a train yard owned by Hammerhead, where he must fight through his mob-employed night staff and Sandman to stop the contact from fleeing aboard a train. Spider-Man eventually confronts the contact, who is revealed as Beetle. Although Beetle manages to escape with the briefcase, he unknowingly leaves behind a clue for Spider-Man: an invitation to the Science and Industry Ball.

Meanwhile, Electro explains his master plan to his accomplices Beetle, Hammerhead, and Sandman: to complete the Bio-Nexus Device. In the hands of an ordinary person, it can amplify their bio-energy to power a city block. In his hands, the device will amplify his powers to god-like levels. The villains have acquired most of the pieces that make up the device, but they still need its power source. Believing its creator, Dr. Watts, might know where it is located, Electro sends Hammerhead and his men to kidnap her at the ball. Hammerhead takes several people hostage, but is foiled by Spider-Man who rescues the hostages before facing and defeating Hammerhead. However, Sandman captures Watts during the confusion. The Daily Bugle releases a newspaper reporting upon the havoc at the ball; the kidnapping of Watts; and the police wanting to bring Spider-Man in for questioning.

Looking for more information on Dr. Watts and why she is sought by the villains, Spider-Man calls Dr. Curt Connors, her colleague at BioTech, only to hear roars on the other end of the line. Fearing Connors has transformed into his monstrous alter-ego once again, Spider-Man infiltrates BioTech and makes his way past security to reach Connors' lab, where he is confronted by the Lizard. After creating an antidote to restore Connors back to normal, Spider-Man learns from him about Electro's plan. He then goes to investigate Watts' lab and discovers that the device can be powered by a fist-sized sapphire. After defeating Sandman by having him washed down a nearby drain, Spider-Man sees a newspaper article from the Daily Bugle about a sapphire called Zeus' Tear on display at the Museum. Realizing it is big enough to power the Bio-Nexus Device, Spider-Man rushes to get there before Electro does.

Electro beats Spider-Man to the museum, but the latter manages to defeat him inside the planetarium and secure the sapphire. Still holding Dr. Watts hostage, Electro coerces Spider-Man into giving him the sapphire by threatening Watts' life. Spider-Man throws the Zeus' Tear into the air as Electro releases Watts. When Spider-Man attempts to take back the sapphire with his webs, he misses which allows Electro to grab it. With the Bio-Nexus Device complete, Electro uses it to supercharge himself into "Hyper-Electro", a being made of pure electrical energy, and flies away in a bolt of lightning. An injured Spider-Man follows him to the top of a nearby skyscraper. (Note: This is explicitly shown to be the World Trade Center in pre-release versions of the game.) Unable to directly attack him, Spider-Man instead uses the tower's generators to disable the Bio-Nexus Device, allowing him to defeat Electro.

The next day, Spider-Man reads the Daily Bugle's front page, which gives Thor full credit for Electro's defeat, whilst deriding Spider-Man for the destruction of the Bio-Nexus Device and Zeus' Tear. Annoyed, he swings away, joking that he should get a new agent.

In prison, Hammerhead and Shocker are playing poker in their cell as Electro moans over his defeat. Hammerhead asks Shocker if he knows any other card games as all he knows is poker. Shocker decides to ask Doctor Octopus, Scorpion, Mysterio, Rhino, and a Jade Syndicate thug, who are imprisoned in a nearby cell, if any of them know how to play Go Fish. A despondent Doctor Octopus is still banging his head against the cell bars.

== Development ==
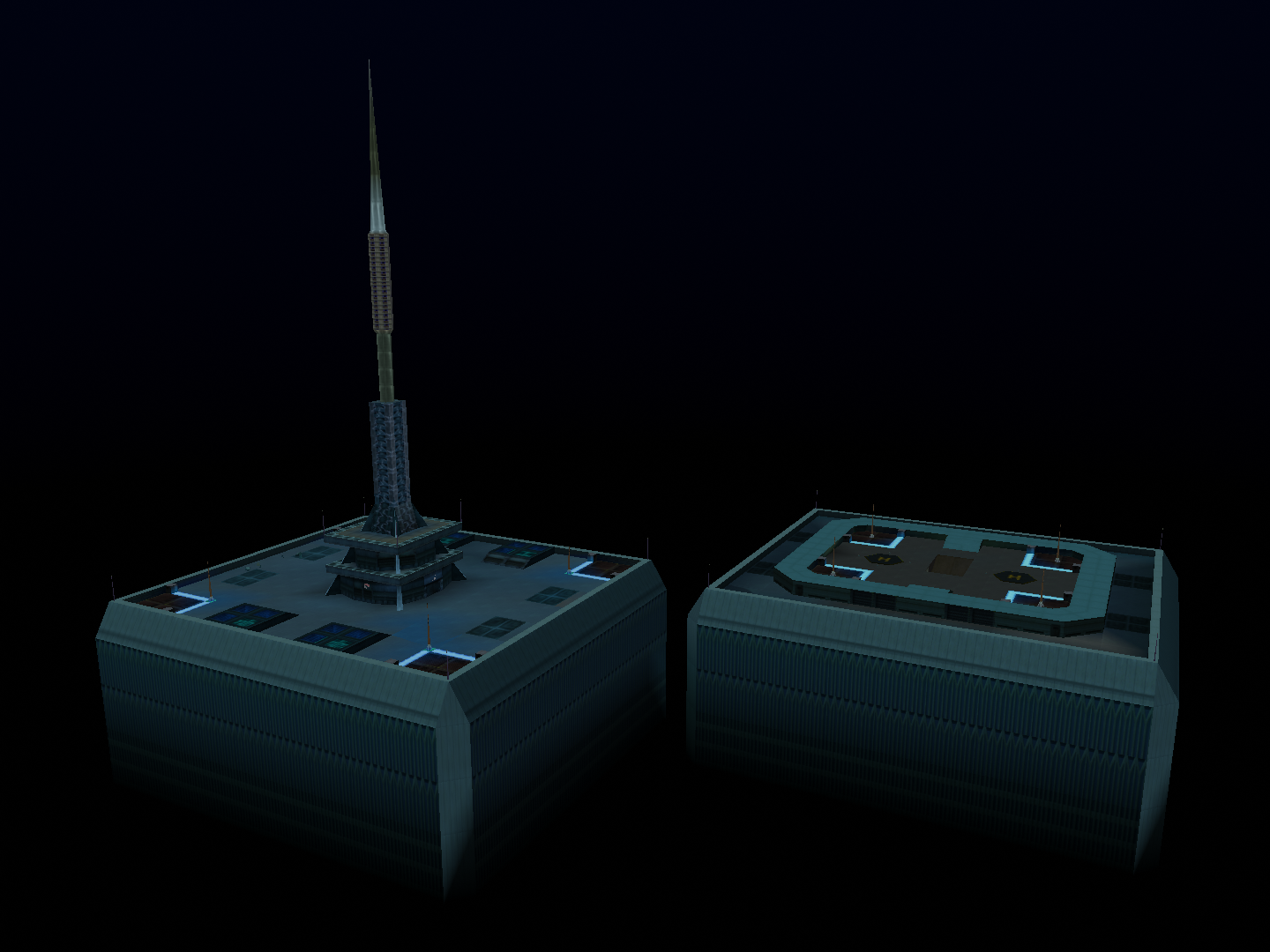
Enter: Electro's final stage prior to the sensitivity changes, depicting the Twin Towers

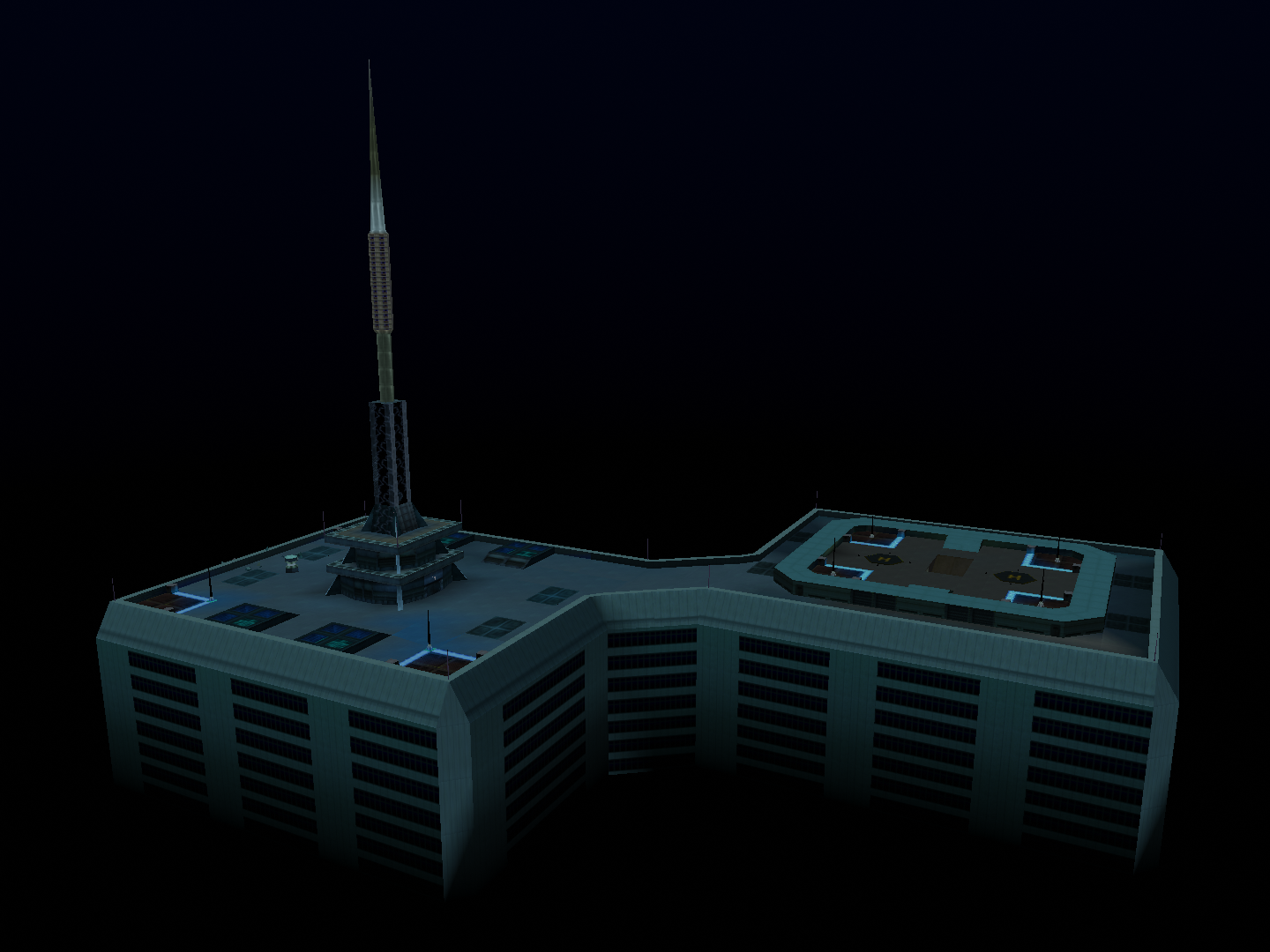
Enter: Electro's final stage in the retail version of the game, with an added bridge between the towers, and a different façade on the buildings to remove associations with the World Trade Center

=== Delay and modifications ===
Enter: Electro was originally scheduled for release on September 18, 2001. Following the September 11 attacks, Activision delayed the release of the game in order to remove references to the World Trade Center, and the game was pushed back to October 18 of that year.

The pre-9/11 version of the game was released online by an Argentinian YouTube user in 2015. The video under which the ISO was linked explains that the uncut version was sourced from the user's childhood copy of the game, which the user suggests may have been a pirated bootleg disc.

It is unknown how uncut retail copies of the game have surfaced in private hands. There is a misconception that the game was recalled from shelves following 9/11, with some sources claiming the game actually released in August of 2001; this has never been verified and there are no contemporary sources confirming either the supposed August release date or the product recall.

=== Web-exclusive material ===
On September 28, 2001, Activision uploaded an exclusive cutscene from the game for download on the official Spider-Man game website. The cutscene contained Spider-Man and Thor meeting following the game's final battle. After being presumed lost since the game's release, a copy of the video surfaced on 24 September 2025. A Reddit user discovered a copy of the original video file on a disused hard drive, and was able to retrieve the file for preservation.

== Reception ==
Reception

Aggregate score
Aggregator	Score
Metacritic	74/100

Review scores
Publication	Score
AllGame	3.5/5
Electronic Gaming Monthly	5.83/10
Eurogamer	4/10
Famitsu	27/40
Game Informer	8.5/10
GamePro	4/5
GameRevolution	B
GameSpot	7.1/10
GameSpy	72%
GameZone	7.8/10
IGN	5.5/10
Next Generation	3/5
Official U.S. PlayStation Magazine	3.5/5
Maxim	8/10

Spider-Man 2: Enter: Electro received mixed reviews, with sentiment leaning more critical than that of the first game. Critics noted the choice of villains was more obscure than its predecessor, and the short length of time to complete the game was criticised. The game's storyline was divisive, as some saw it as below average and not up to par with the last installment, while others enjoyed it. The graphics, voice acting, soundtrack, and gameplay received praise, however. Jeff Lundrigan of Next Generation called it "a worthy successor, if not as exceptional as the original". In Japan, where the game was ported and published by Success on October 31, 2002, Famitsu gave it a score of 27 out of 40.

== Sequel ==
A standalone sequel titled Spider-Man: Mysterio's Menace was released in 2001 for the Game Boy Advance. In addition, the video game adaptation of the 2002 film shares a similar gameplay style to both Enter: Electro and its predecessor.
