= Spider-Man: Return of the Sinister Six =

1992 video game

- NES cover art
- Developer: Bits Studios
- Publisher: Acclaim Entertainment (Note: Released under the LJN brand on the NES and the Flying Edge brand on Sega systems)
- Composer: David Whittaker
- Series: Spider-Man
- Platforms: NES, Master System, Game Gear
- Release: NES; October 1992; Master System, Game Gear; 1993
- Genre: Action-adventure
- Mode: Single-player

Spider-Man: Return of the Sinister Six is a 1992 action-adventure video game featuring the Marvel Comics characters Spider-Man and the Sinister Six. It was developed by Bits Studios and published by Acclaim Entertainment under the LJN banner for the Nintendo Entertainment System in 1992. Versions of the game were also released for the Master System and Game Gear by Acclaim's Flying Edge division. The game is loosely based on the story arc of the same name, which was published in The Amazing Spider-Man #334-339 in the early 1990s.

== Plot ==
Doctor Octopus is setting his master plan into action to take over the world with the help of the Sinister Six. Spider-Man must defeat all of them and save the world.

== Gameplay ==
The player controls Spider-Man through six side-scrolling levels, with a member of the Sinister Six (Electro, Sandman, Mysterio, Vulture, Hobgoblin, and Doctor Octopus) at the end of each level as a boss. Spider-Man can jump, punch, kick, duck, climb certain walls and trees, shoot webs to swing on and collect web fluid to shoot square web projectiles.

The levels are generally straightforward side-scrolling action, although occasionally a particular item such as key or a detonator has to be found.

Spider-Man has only one life in the NES version, but also has one continue. There are no items available to restore energy. However, defeating several enemies can restore Spider-Man's power bar.

== Ports ==
In comparison to the NES version, the Master System version is easier as certain items were moved (typically to easier places to find), some enemies are taken out, some jumps are redesigned to be easier, and Doctor Octopus and Mysterio now only have one health bar (versus the NES version where they would regenerate a few times before being defeated), among a few other changes.

The Game Gear version is identical to the Master System version, except that the screen shows a smaller portion of the level, which makes it harder to see incoming projectiles.

== Reception ==
Nintendo Power commented on the NES version of the game, praising the graphics while stating the play control was weak, commenting that "you can release what looks like a perfect punch and end up swinging right past your enemy".
