= Spider-Man (2000 video game) =

2000 video game

- North American PlayStation cover art
- Developer: Neversoft (Note: Treyarch developed the Dreamcast version, LTI Gray Matter developed the Windows version, Westlake Interactive developed the Mac version, Edge of Reality developed the Nintendo 64 version, and Vicarious Visions developed the Game Boy Color version.)
- Publishers: Activision; Aspyr (Mac)
- Producers: Kevin Mulhall; Marc Turndorf
- Designer: Chad Findley
- Programmers: Dave Cowling; Kendall Harrison; Matt Duncan
- Artist: Chris Ward
- Composers: Tommy Tallarico; Howard Ulyate
- Series: Spider-Man
- Platforms: PlayStation; Nintendo 64; Dreamcast; Game Boy Color; Windows; Mac OS
- Release: August 30, 2000: PlayStation; NA: August 30, 2000; UK: September 15, 2000 Game Boy Color; NA: August 31, 2000; UK: September 15, 2000 Nintendo 64; NA: November 21, 2000 Dreamcast; NA: May 1, 2001; EU: June 1, 2001 Windows; NA: September 20, 2001; EU: September 21, 2001 Mac OS; NA: January 24, 2002
- Genre: Action-adventure
- Mode: Single-player

Spider-Man is a 2000 action-adventure game based on the Marvel Comics character of the same name. It was developed by Neversoft and published by Activision for the PlayStation. The game was later ported by different developers to various systems, including the Game Boy Color and Nintendo 64 that same year, the Dreamcast and Microsoft Windows in 2001, and Mac OS in 2002.

The game's story follows Spider-Man as he attempts to clear his name after being framed by a doppelgänger and becoming a wanted criminal, while also having to foil a symbiote invasion orchestrated by Doctor Octopus and Carnage. Numerous villains from the comics appear as bosses, including Scorpion, Rhino, Venom, Mysterio, Carnage, and Doctor Octopus, as well as a Carnage symbiote-possessed Doctor Octopus named Monster-Ock, who was created exclusively for the game. The game features narration from co-creator Stan Lee, and is the first Spider-Man game published by Activision following their acquisition of the license, which would expire in 2014.

Spider-Man received an overall generally positive reception. It was followed by three sequels in 2001: the Game Boy Color-exclusive Spider-Man 2: The Sinister Six, developed by Torus Games; the PlayStation-exclusive Spider-Man 2: Enter: Electro, developed by Vicarious Visions; and the Game Boy Advance-exclusive Spider-Man: Mysterio's Menace, also developed by Vicarious Visions.

== Gameplay ==
Spider-Man places emphasis on using the titular character's powers. Here he ascends the wall of a building while avoiding incoming rocket fire.

The game has the player controlling Spider-Man as he goes through each level, either trying to reach the exit or complete a certain objective. The player must retry the current level if Spider-Man runs out of health, falls off a building or fails to complete certain objectives such as rescuing a hostage. Spider-Man is able to utilize his spider powers to traverse the environments, being able to crawl on walls and ceilings, swing short distances and instantly zip between certain points. In combat, Spider-Man can utilize a limited supply of web-cartridges to attack his enemies, either webbing them up to stall or defeat them, increasing the strength of his attacks or forming an explosive barrier.

Spider-Man can also find comics, which unlock a Spider-Man comic book issue cover in the menu screen, as well as power-ups such as Spider-Armor which temporarily increases his strength and defense, and Fire Webbing which is effective against symbiotes. Several alternate costumes are available to unlock, each with their own attributes. Some costumes provide enhancements, while others provide no change or detriments. For example, the Spider-Man 2099 costume features enhanced strength, while the civilian Peter Parker suit limits the available number of web cartridges to two. The Ben Reilly costume in contrast contains no enhancements or detriments.

Many stages contain a prologue narration from series co-creator Stan Lee.

== Plot ==
A supposedly reformed Dr. Otto Octavius is holding a scientific demonstration at the Science Expo 2000, but is interrupted when an impostor Spider-Man attacks the crew and steals his equipment. Eddie Brock tries to take pictures for the Daily Bugle, but the impostor shatters his camera. In a rage, the Venom symbiote resurfaces inside Brock, and he vows vengeance against Spider-Man.

Meanwhile, the real Spider-Man, who witnessed the incident as Peter Parker, is held responsible for the theft and the police ensue a manhunt for him. Elsewhere, two unseen figures release dense amounts of mysterious fog from their hidden base into the city which quickly covers the streets. After meeting with Black Cat and foiling a bank robbery by the Jade Syndicate, Spider-Man is forced to save J. Jonah Jameson from Scorpion at the Daily Bugle. He defeats Scorpion only for an ungrateful Jameson to call the police on him. While trying to escape, Spider-Man encounters Daredevil who promises to spread the word about Spider-Man's innocence.

After evading a police helicopter, Spider-Man reunites with Black Cat who informs him of two new problems: Rhino is attacking a power plant and Venom has kidnapped his wife Mary Jane Parker to lure out Spider-Man. Choosing to deal with Rhino first, Spider-Man and Black Cat defeat him and leave him for the police, but Black Cat gets badly wounded during the fight and is kidnapped by unknown assailants posing as paramedics. After encouragement from Human Torch, Spider-Man sets out to find Venom only for Venom to instead find Spider-Man and goad him, leading to a chase throughout the city and eventually into Venom's hideout in the sewers.

During his pursuit, Spider-Man encounters the Lizard who was imprisoned by Venom after taking control of his Lizard Men (who attacked Spider-Man at various points during the chase). The Lizard points Spider-Man to Venom's lair where the former rescues Mary Jane and defeats Venom. To make amends with Spider-Man after learning he was framed, Venom offers to assist him in finding the culprit to which Spider-Man begrudgingly agrees.

The two head to the Daily Bugle to search through Jameson's files for answers. During the search, Venom senses Carnage's presence nearby and leaves to find him. Left to investigate on his own, Spider-Man discovers an infestation of Symbiotes in the building and clears them out before encountering the impostor Spider-Man, who revealed to be Mysterio in disguise. After defeating him, Spider-Man learns Mysterio was hired to keep Spider-Man distracted while his employer infests New York with Symbiotes and that the fog over the city will act as a beacon for the symbiotes, preparing the citizens for symbiosis.

On his way to Warehouse 65 where the hideout of Mysterio's employer is located, Spider-Man encounters Punisher, whom he convinces about his innocence. In turn, Punisher offers Spider-Man help with infiltrating the warehouse. Not looking to raise the amount of casualties, Spider-Man declines.

Spider-Man discovers an entrance to a massive undersea base inside the warehouse and proceeds to investigate, quickly coming across a symbiote manufacturing operation and an imprisoned Black Cat. After disrupting the operation and rescuing Black Cat, Spider-Man finally confronts her kidnappers and the masterminds behind the Symbiote invasion: Dr. Octavius and Carnage. Taking up his Doctor Octopus persona once again, Octavius explains that he faked his reform and that, with the help of Carnage (who donated his Carnage symbiote to be cloned), he hopes to create a new world dominated by symbiotes under his rule. Later, Venom appears and takes on Carnage while Spider-Man fights Doctor Octopus. After both Doctor Octopus and Venom are defeated, Spider-Man fights Carnage and defeats him by sustaining him into a sonic bubble.

Following his defeat, the Carnage symbiote separates from Cletus Kasady and fuses with Doctor Octopus, creating "Monster-Ock". Unable to perform an effective battle, Spider-Man is chased by the monstrosity out of the self-destructing base until it is caught in one of the explosions which removes the symbiote from Doctor Octopus's body. As the Carnage symbiote slithers back into the burning base, Spider-Man carries the unconscious Doctor Octopus to the surface where they are salvaged by Captain America, Black Cat, and Venom in an aircraft.

Sometime later, Spider-Man is playing cards with Captain America, Daredevil, and the Punisher, while Black Cat and the Human Torch are dancing.

In prison, Doctor Octopus' cellmates—Mysterio, Rhino, Scorpion, and a Jade Syndicate thug—are also playing cards. Mysterio mentions to Rhino, Scorpion, and the Jade Syndicate thug that nobody can control the Symbiotes. When Rhino mistakenly thinks he got a bingo, he accidentally sends the Jade Syndicate thug's head through the roof. Annoyed and despondent, Doctor Octopus bangs his head against the cell bars.

== Development ==
The game was announced on December 2, 1998. Spider-Man uses the same game engine as Tony Hawk's Pro Skater. Spider-Man was a hidden character in Tony Hawk's Pro Skater 2, and a reference is made to this during gameplay. The PlayStation, Dreamcast, and Windows versions have pre-rendered cutscenes, whereas the Nintendo 64 version shows captioned freeze-frames done in the style of a comic book and with fewer voice clips, due to that console's technical limitations for cutscenes.

Several ideas like street levels, Vulture and Lizard bosses, as well as a Venom boss fight on the Brooklyn Bridge were scrapped due to hardware limitations and time constraints. The idea of "Monster-Ock" was thought up in the beginning of development as a way to end the game on a high note, and the "Kid Mode" difficulty mode was implemented to appeal to the younger crowd. The Lizard would eventually be a boss in the 2001 sequel Spider-Man 2: Enter: Electro, although in the storyboards of the final cutscene of this game, Lizard is shown in the jail cell along with Doc Ock, Mysterio, Scorpion and Rhino. The earliest footage of the game was found in the German demo disc "PlayDemo Vol. 17", which featured various changes such as a different opening sequence, placeholder voice performances, an unused model for Scorpion that more resembles his classic comic appearance as opposed to his more recent design from Spider-Man: The Animated Series in the final game (having been changed to help him be more visible according to Findley), an entirely different Rhino boss stage, as well as a sewer level not found in the final game.

=== Audio ===
[Stan Lee] gave every line he read 110% [...] he would not move on until he gave it the delivery he thought it deserved.

— Chad Findley, lead designer on Stan Lee's voice narration.

Some of the voice actors from both Spider-Man: The Animated Series and Spider-Man Unlimited cartoons reprise their respective roles. For instance, Rino Romano reprises his role as Spider-Man/Peter Parker from Spider-Man Unlimited as well as voicing Bank Thug #1, Jennifer Hale reprises her roles as both Black Cat from the 1994 Spider-Man cartoon and Mary Jane Watson from Spider-Man Unlimited. Efrem Zimbalist Jr. reprises his role as Doctor Octopus from the 1994 Spider-Man TV series. The main song is a remix of the 1960s Spider-Man cartoon theme by the UK electronic music group Apollo 440. Stan Lee narrates key parts of the story. Daran Norris voices Venom/Eddie Brock, Mysterio, Scorpion, Punisher, Human Torch and Captain America while Dee Bradley Baker voices Carnage, J. Jonah Jameson, Lizard, Daredevil, and Rhino. Christopher Corey Smith voices Microchip, Hostage, Police Pilot, and Sniper. Chad Findley, lead designer of the game, voices Bank Thug #1, Eagle-One Pilot, and Security Guard.

=== Soundtrack ===
The game's soundtrack was composed by Tommy Tallarico and Howard Ulyate. It features a variety of tracks mostly arranged in individual samples, influenced by popular music genres of the time such as industrial rock and nu metal. The samples correlate to actions in-game, such as when Spider-Man is battling an enemy, and fade out when the action is over. However some levels have a fixed soundtrack, including boss battles. The Nintendo 64 port includes a sound test where the individual samples of tracks can be listened to. It can be accessed via cheat code.

The game's title screen and credits roll use the theme song of the 1960s Spider-Man animated series, remixed by English electronic band Apollo 440.

== Reception ==
Reception

Aggregate scores
Aggregator	Score				
Aggregator	Dreamcast	GBC	N64	PC	PS
GameRankings	80%	67%	83%	68%	87%
Metacritic	80/100	N/A	72/100	68/100	87/100

Review scores
Publication	Score				
Publication	Dreamcast	GBC	N64	PC	PS
AllGame	3.5/5	4/5	4/5	3.5/5	4/5
Electronic Gaming Monthly	7.5/10	N/A	7/10	N/A	7.83/10
Eurogamer	N/A	N/A	N/A	N/A	9/10
Game Informer	N/A	N/A	8/10	N/A	N/A
GameFan	N/A	N/A	N/A	N/A	73%
GamePro	5/5	N/A	3.5/5	N/A	4.5/5
GameRevolution	B	N/A	C	N/A	B−
GameSpot	7.2/10	6.5/10	7.8/10	6.6/10	7.7/10
GameSpy	8/10	N/A	N/A	77%	N/A
GameZone	7/10	N/A	N/A	7/10	N/A
IGN	8.4/10	9/10	8.5/10	6/10	9/10
Next Generation	4/5	N/A	N/A	N/A	4/5
Nintendo Power	N/A	7.1/10	4.5/5	N/A	N/A
Official U.S. PlayStation Magazine	N/A	N/A	N/A	N/A	5/5
PC Gamer (US)	N/A	N/A	N/A	78%	N/A

While reviews varied from system to system, Spider-Man received generally positive reviews. GameRankings shows aggregate scores of 86.53% for the PlayStation version, 66.91% for the Game Boy Color version, 82.52% for the Nintendo 64 version, 80.23% for the Dreamcast version, and 67.96% for the PC version. Metacritic shows scores of 87 out of 100 for the PlayStation version, 72 out of 100 for the Nintendo 64 version, 80 out of 100 for the Dreamcast version, and 68 out of 100 for the PC version. In September 2000 Activision reported that the game held the number two position for third-party published games on the PlayStation, though no official sales numbers were given.

IGN gave the PlayStation version a 9 out of 10, calling it "arguably, the best Spider-Man game", giving a 8.4 for the Dreamcast version calling it "good fun for anyone with a Dreamcast that hasn't played the PlayStation version", while expecting more from a powerful system like the Dreamcast. The PC version, however, got a scathing review for essentially being a port of the Dreamcast with no major changes. GameSpot gave the PlayStation version a 7.7, calling it "excellent framework on which to base future Spider-Man games – and an exceptional game to boot".

Greg Orlando reviewed the PlayStation version of the game for Next Generation, rating it four stars out of five, and stated that "Excelsior! Great web-slinging fun".

Scott Steinberg reviewed the Dreamcast version of the game for Next Generation, rating it four stars out of five, and stated that "a fun but slightly flawed superhero action adventure that'll have you bouncing off the walls. Literally".

Spider-Man's PlayStation version received a "Platinum" sales award from the Entertainment and Leisure Software Publishers Association (ELSPA), indicating sales of at least 300,000 copies in the United Kingdom.

== Sequels ==
The game has spawned three sequels in 2001: Spider-Man 2: The Sinister Six served as an alternative continuation that followed the events of the Game Boy Color version instead. The game eventually got a true sequel titled Spider-Man 2: Enter: Electro, released exclusively for the PlayStation, and a standalone sequel, Spider-Man: Mysterio's Menace, for the Game Boy Advance exclusively.

== Potential remaster ==
In a November 2019 interview, former Neversoft employee and lead designer of Spider-Man Chad Findley expressed interest in developing a remaster of the game, but admitted that it would be unlikely due to "the nightmarish licensing and approval processes that are around these days".
