= Spider-Man: The Video Game =

1991 video game

- Japanese arcade flyer
- Developer: Sega
- Publisher: Sega
- Designer: Roppyaku Tsurumi
- Composer: Kazuhiko Nagai
- Platform: Arcade
- Release: September 1991
- Genre: Beat 'em up
- Modes: Single-player, multiplayer
- Arcade system: Sega System 32

Spider-Man: The Video Game, also known as Spider-Man, (Note: Japanese: スパイダーマン, Hepburn: Supaidāman) is a 1991 arcade video game developed by Sega based on the Marvel Comics character Spider-Man.

== Plot ==
Spider-Man and his allies must retrieve a mystical artifact first from the Kingpin, then Doctor Doom.

== Gameplay ==
Screenshot of gameplay

The game was released as a coin-operated arcade title based on the Sega System 32 hardware. The game can be played as a single player game or up to four players cooperatively. Each character can perform a special move related to their super power which draws from their health.

Throughout its levels, the gameplay changes from a side-scrolling beat 'em up into a platform game in which the camera zooms to a far-away view of the characters before it zooms back in for the much larger and more detailed characters to continue brawling.

The game was divided into four acts, encountering various villains, including Kingpin, Venom and his symbiote clones, Doctor Octopus, Electro, Lizard, Scorpion, Sandman, Green Goblin, Hobgoblin, and finally Doctor Doom. High scores are separated by character; so a high score on Spider-Man may not be a high score on Hawkeye or Black Cat.

Spider-Man: The Video Game's soundtrack is also composed partially of songs from Sega's 1986 arcade game Quartet, notably the tunes "Oki Rap" and "FM Funk" (for instance, "FM Funk" appears in the second stage in Spider-Man, while it is featured in the third stage of Quartet).

== Characters ==
The game allows the user to play as one of four heroes: Spider-Man, Black Cat, Sub-Mariner, or Hawkeye. Unlike many games of this type which assigned a certain character to a certain joystick, any player can choose any character (as long as another player isn't already controlling them).

Each hero has a unique set of moves and attacks/abilities, which could be used to beat up the bad guys, that suited their powers and characteristics, as well as basic attacks and jumps (assigned to each of the two buttons).

Spider-Man is the game's main hero and protagonist. Spider-Man’s moveset consists primarily of attacks based on his spider powers, such as web-swinging and firing webbing blasts.

Black Cat is athletic and acrobatic like a cat, using a combination of her claws, grappling hook and cables to defeat enemies.

Recognizable as one of the Avengers, Hawkeye's attacks and abilities revolve around the use of his bow and arrows.

A citizen of Atlantis, Sub-Mariner uses water based projectile attacks, such as a hydro-electric blast, in combat.

== Development ==
Spider-Man: The Video Game was showcased at the 1991 Las Vegas Amusement Expo.

== Reception ==
In Japan, Game Machine listed Spider-Man on their November 1, 1991 issue as being the fourteenth most-successful table arcade unit of the month. In the United States, it was the top-grossing new video game on the RePlay arcade charts in November 1991. In Australia, it was the top-grossing arcade conversion kit on the Timezone charts in November 1991.

The November 1991 issue of Sinclair User gave it the shared award for "Games Most Likely To Save The Universe" as one of the best superhero games, along with Captain America and The Avengers and Captain Commando.

The game was reviewed in 1992 in Dragon #177 by Hartley, Patricia, and Kirk Lesser in "The Role of Computers" column. The reviewers gave the game 5 out of 5 stars.

The January 1992 issue of Computer and Video Games gave it a positive review, praising the four-player gameplay, the "incredible graphics" with "huge, beautifully animated sprites and an impressive zoom in/zoom out effect" and the "16 different stages" with "enough to keep you pumping in the credits".

== See also ==
- List of Spider-Man video games
