= The Amazing Spider-Man (1990 video game) =

1990 video game

- Developer: Oxford Digital Enterprises
- Publishers: NA: Paragon Software; EU: Empire Software
- Programmers: Kevin Ayre, John Wood
- Artists: Kevin Ayre, Colin Swinbourne
- Composer: Steven W. Green
- Platforms: Commodore 64, Amiga, IBM PC, Amstrad CPC, Atari ST
- Release: 1990
- Genre: Platform
- Mode: Single-player

The Amazing Spider-Man is a platform game featuring the Marvel comic book character Spider-Man. The game was developed by Oxford Digital Enterprises and released in 1990 for Commodore 64 and Amiga, and later ported to IBM PC compatibles, Amstrad CPC, and Atari ST. The title was published by Paragon Software in North America and by Empire Software in Europe.

== Plot ==
The plot involves Spider-Man's wife, Mary Jane, being kidnapped by Mysterio. To save her, Spider-Man must navigate through various environments and puzzles divided into separate acts, representing Mysterio's obsession with film. The various rooms are often parodies of film genres.

== Development ==
In December 1990 issue of British gaming magazine The One, Rick Yapp from Oxford Digital Enterprises was interviewed about The Amazing Spider-Man's development. Yapp explained how platforming was added during the development stage of the game and it was not included in its original design: "The platform idea wasn't part of the original brief. It just seemed to fit in quite nicely with the ability to swing on webs properly. And we thought a straight beat 'em up was a bit boring for someone of Peter Parker's intelligence". Yapp also added that Spider-Man's sprite was downscaled to make room for more animations: "The reason we've done that is that we can have a massive animation table in there. Because he can be shown in all orientations, such as walking along ceilings and crawling up walls, there's 256 frames of animation just for the Spider-Man sprite".

The Amazing Spider-Man's movie studio setting was partially concepted due to the team wanting to incorporate movie references into the game. The Amazing Spider-Man's music is stated to be "not really" based upon music from previous Spider-Man media. The MS-DOS version of the game supports AdLib sound cards and enables game's speed manual setting, thus allowing faster computers to run the game faster. All ports of the game have a feature where, in specific rooms, the player may save the game to RAM as opposed to the hard disk.

== See also ==
- List of Spider-Man video games
