= Ultimate Spider-Man: Total Mayhem =

2010 video game

- Developer: Gameloft
- Publisher: Gameloft
- Producers: Wang Yao; Thomas Aurick
- Designers: Tan Zen; Stanislas Dewavrin
- Artists: Wang Rui; Arthur Hugot
- Composers: Nicolas Dube; Nicola Archambault
- Platforms: iOS, Android
- Release: iOS: WW: September 1, 2010; Android: WW: April 14, 2011
- Genre: Beat-em-up
- Mode: Single-player

Ultimate Spider-Man: Total Mayhem (also known as Spider-Man: Total Mayhem) is a 2010 action video game for the iOS and Android systems. It was developed and published by Gameloft. The game takes place in the Ultimate Marvel Universe (Earth-1610). It is no longer available for purchase in the App Store for iPhone and Google Play Store for Android. The game features a rogues gallery of villains from the Ultimate Universe, and is played as a series of occurring events rather than an overarching plot. The title received generally favorable reviews from critics, with the iOS version holding an 85/100 on Metacritic.

== Gameplay ==
Ultimate Spider-Man: Total Mayhem utilizes on-screen buttons to control the character.

Ultimate Spider-Man: Total Mayhem is an action game where the player controls the titular hero. Controls are handled through a touchscreen interface, with on-screen buttons serving the same purpose as physical buttons. In the lower-left of the screen a single on-screen button simulates an analog stick, controlling movement. Three on-screen buttons in the lower right correspond to various attacks. Attacks can be chained together to perform up to 20 different combos. The player can also make use of Spider-sense, a precognitive ability which the hero possesses. An on-screen warning directs the player to dodge before certain enemy attacks. If the player reacts correctly Spider-Man will dodge the attack. Successful dodges and attacks build up Spider-Man's energy meter. When full the player can unleash a powerful attack on enemies.

In addition to brawler gameplay some sequences in the game have Spider-Man web-swinging to his destination. Here the player must tap the screen in rhythm with the hero's swing to smoothly connect each swing. The game features 12 levels in total.

== Plot ==
At the start of the game, Spider-Man (Andrew Chaikin) finds a group of thugs attacking a woman. He fights them off, only to have the woman he saved call him a freak and run away. Spider-Man is then seen chasing Sandman through New York City. They engage in combat and Sandman is defeated, just before Rhino throws a car at Spider-Man who avoids it. Rhino manages to escape and then the Triskelion can be seen in flames. It is later revealed that the fire was caused by an explosion, which let all super-villains free from the prison, along with symbiotes created from a mixture of the venom suit and OZ formula. Throughout the game, Spider-Man has to fight several villains which appear in Ultimate Spider-Man comics, such as Electro, Green Goblin and Rhino. Many of the villains' followers, such as symbiotes, thugs and goblins, have to be fought as well.

After fighting Electro, the police talk to Spider-Man, saying that if he continues to fight villains, they would have to send Roxxon security robots to get him, as they have the situation under control. After fighting Venom twice and facing a symbiote army, Spider-Man is informed by S.H.I.E.L.D. agents that Norman Osborn (Green Goblin) has captured some baseball players, as well as the mayor and threatened to transform them into goblins unless the whole city is given to him. Spider-Man fights Doctor Octopus and then heads to the stadium, where he finds Green Goblin, who escapes. After chasing Norman through Manhattan, Spider-Man fights and defeats him. Green Goblin is taken by S.H.I.E.L.D. agents, who thank Spider-Man for his help and inform him that Dr. Connors (Lizard) had been working to create an antidote for the symbiotes left in the city.

At the end of the game, Spider-Man is sitting on a bench, when the woman which appears in the beginning of the game, comes to him and apologizes. She says he is not a freak after all, before Spider-Man swings off.

== Development ==
Ultimate Spider-Man: Total Mayhem was developed and published by Gameloft. It was unveiled at E3 2010. A cinematic trailer was released on August 27, 2010. The game was released for iOS on September 1, 2010, A port to Android followed on April 14, 2011.

== Reception ==
Reception

Aggregate score
Aggregator	Score
Metacritic	85/100

Review scores
Publication	Score
Eurogamer	5/10
IGN	8.5/10
VideoGamer.com	6/10
Pocket Gamer	4.5/5
AppSpy	5/5

Ultimate Spider-Man: Total Mayhem received generally favorable reviews. The iOS version of the game holds a Metacritic score of 85% based on ten critic reviews. While no official sales numbers were released, Gameloft listed it as part of their titles that led them to 20 million collective downloads.

The game received high marks for its visuals. Tracy Erickson of Pocket Gamer called the graphics "stunning" and noted while the game had improved visuals on the iPhone 4, it still performed well on the iPhone 3G. IGN's Levi Buchanan also praised the graphics. He further praised the game's combo system and said the game was "one of the best action games in the App Store right now." Buchanan further praised the game's narrative, calling it "well constructed". Andrew Nesvadba of AppSpy also gave the game high marks, noting that despite its flaws it was one of the best games available on iOS devices at that time. Jasmin Smith of Video Gamer stated that while Ultimate Spider-Man: Total Mayhem is not a bad game, it "play[s] out like every other action orientated game Gameloft has churned out on the App Store." Jasmin Smith of Video Gamer felt that the combat system was "uninvolving".

In a critical review Kristan Reed of Eurogamer gave the game a 5 out of 10. He found the game's controls frustrating and boss battles "irritating". Reed did concede that the visuals were strong, and called them "vibrant". IGN's Levi Buchanan felt that the controls were less precise on the iPad than the iPhone, and noted they do not scale well. Controls were a criticism of Pocket Gamer reviewer Tracy Erickson as well. Erickson particularly noted that the evade system often was hindered by being backed against a wall, or appearing all to late altogether. Jasmin Smith of Video Gamer stated that while Ultimate Spider-Man: Total Mayhem is not a bad game, it "play[s] out like every other action orientated game Gameloft has churned out on the App Store."
