= Spider-Man: Mysterio's Menace =

2001 video game

- European cover art
- Developer: Vicarious Visions
- Publisher: Activision
- Series: Spider-Man
- Platform: Game Boy Advance
- Release: NA: September 18, 2001; EU: September 21, 2001
- Genre: Action
- Mode: Single-player

Spider-Man: Mysterio's Menace is a 2001 action video game based on the Marvel Comics character Spider-Man. It was developed by Vicarious Visions and published by Activision for the Game Boy Advance. The game is a standalone sequel to Spider-Man (2000) and Spider-Man 2: Enter: Electro (2001). It was released on September 18, 2001, in North America, and on April 26, 2002, in Japan. The game was later re-released on a Twin Pack cartridge bundled with X2: Wolverine's Revenge in 2005.

== Plot ==
The game begins with Peter Parker's wife Mary Jane Watson reminding him to buy a new fishbowl for their fish. After a news report however, Peter changes to Spider-Man and tries to investigate a few criminal activities all taking place in one night. This pits him against a rogue's gallery of villains, including Rhino, Hammerhead, Big Wheel, Electro and Scorpion. They are led by the game's titular antagonist: the Master of Illusion, Mysterio. After subduing his fellow super-villains, Spider-Man defeats Mysterio himself in the final level. Mysterio escapes, but leaves his helmet behind. Peter brings it back home to Mary Jane as their new fishbowl.

== Gameplay ==
The game has 7 stages, each featuring a boss at the end – Hammerhead (who appears at the end of two levels), Big Wheel, Electro, Rhino, Scorpion and Mysterio as the final boss. The player can choose between three stages to begin with, each opening a further level after completion and concluding the story for that part of the game with comic book-styled cutscenes. The game allows players to freely web swing, attack with different punches and kicks, and to shoot web at foes to capture or attack them whilst progressing through levels and avoiding obstacles such as razors and fire. The player can collect upgrades to enhance Spider-Man's strength, health and webbing, as well as "suits" that enhance and protect him from certain obstacles. The final upgrade is the Symbiote Suit which slowly replenishes Spider-Man's health and web, and is obtained in the final level.

== Reception ==
Reception

Aggregate score
Aggregator	Score
Metacritic	84/100

Review scores
Publication	Score
AllGame	3.5/5
Electronic Gaming Monthly	6/10
Famitsu	28/40
Game Informer	7.5/10
GamePro	4.5/5
GameSpot	8.5/10
GameSpy	89%
GameZone	7.8/10
IGN	8.5/10
Nintendo Power	4.5/5
Nintendo World Report	9/10

The game received "favorable" reviews according to the review aggregation website Metacritic. In Japan, Famitsu gave it a score of all four sevens for a total of 28 out of 40.
