= Mac Gargan =

Marvel Comics supervillain

- Mac Gargan / Scorpion; Textless variant cover of Miles Morales: Spider-Man #4 (March 2023). Art by Alex Ross.

Publication information
- First appearance: As Mac Gargan: The Amazing Spider-Man #19 (December 1964); As the Scorpion: Amazing Spider-Man #20 (January 1965); As Venom: Marvel Knights: Spider-Man #10 (March 2005); As Spider-Man: Dark Avengers #1 (March 2009); As Virus: Venom (vol. 4) #25 (July 2020)
- Created by: Stan Lee; Steve Ditko

In-story information
- Full name: MacDonald "Mac" Gargan
- Species: Human mutate
- Team affiliations: Sinister Six; Masters of Evil; Sinister Twelve; Dark Avengers; Thunderbolts; Savage Six; Cape-Killers
- Notable aliases: Scorpion; Venom; Spider-Man; Virus
- Abilities: As Scorpion: Superhuman strength, speed, agility, stamina, durability and reflexes; Precognitive Scorpion-sense; Wearing scorpion-like armor with a cybernetic tail that has projectile weapons; Ability to cling to most surfaces; As Venom: Symbiote granting: Immunity to Spider-Man's spider-sense; All of Spider-Man's powers; Limited shapeshifting

MacDonald "Mac" Gargan is a supervillain appearing in American comic books published by Marvel Comics. Created by writer Stan Lee and artist Steve Ditko, the character first appeared in The Amazing Spider-Man #19 (1964). He is the first and best-known incarnation of the Scorpion, and has endured as one of the superhero Spider-Man's most recurring villains, belonging to the collective of adversaries that make up his rogues gallery.

Originally a private investigator hired by J. Jonah Jameson to learn how Peter Parker managed to take pictures of Spider-Man, Gargan was later subjected to a barely-tested procedure funded by Jameson, intended to turn him into a deadly adversary for Spider-Man. The experiment left Gargan with a scorpion-themed armor grafted onto his body, and the predatory instincts of the arachnid. Driven insane by his mutation, Gargan quickly turned to a life of crime as the Scorpion and went on to menace both Spider-Man and Jameson, whom he held responsible for his transformation.

In subsequent decades, Gargan would manage to have his armor removed and served as the third host of the Venom symbiote from 2005 to 2010. While bonded to the symbiote, he became a member of the Dark Avengers under the alias Spider-Man, before the two were forcefully separated. Since then, Gargan has returned to his Scorpion alias and began wearing his signature armor once more, as it kept him alive following the strain both the neural-armors and the symbiote put on his body.

Since his original introduction during the Silver Age of Comic Books, the character has been featured in various other Marvel-licensed products, including feature films, television series, video games, and merchandise. Michael Mando portrayed Mac Gargan in the Marvel Cinematic Universe (MCU) films Spider-Man: Homecoming (2017) and Spider-Man: Brand New Day (2026), while an alternate version of the character appeared in animated form in the Disney+ series Your Friendly Neighborhood Spider-Man (2025).

== Publication history ==
=== Creation ===
Mac Gargan was created by writer Stan Lee and artist Steve Ditko, first appearing in The Amazing Spider-Man #19 (cover dated December 1964). He debuted as a private investigator hired by Daily Bugle publisher J. Jonah Jameson to determine how Peter Parker routinely obtained photographs of Spider-Man, though Parker's spider-sense allowed him to detect and evade Gargan without difficulty.

=== 2000s ===
Mac Gargan appeared as the third Venom in Marvel Knights: Spider-Man #10 (January 12, 2005). He later appeared as the third Spider-Man in Dark Avengers #1 (January 21, 2009). He appeared as a regular character in the series from issue #1 through issue #16 (May 12, 2010). He appeared in the 2009 Dark Reign: Sinister Spider-Man series, his first solo comic book series, by writer Brian Reed and artist Chris Bachalo. According to Diamond Comic Distributors, Dark Reign: Sinister Spider-Man #1 was the 45th best selling comic book in June 2009. Dark Reign: Sinister Spider-Man #2 was the 68th best selling comic book in July 2009.

=== 2010s ===
Mac Gargan reappeared under the codename Scorpion in the "Big Time" story arc from the 2010 The Amazing Spider-Man series. He appeared in the 2019 Absolute Carnage series.

=== 2020s ===
Mac Gargan appeared in the 2020 Ravencroft series. He also appeared in the 2022 Miles Morales: Spider-Man series.

== Fictional character biography ==
=== Scorpion ===
Mac Gargan is a private investigator who is initially hired by J. Jonah Jameson to find out how Peter Parker is able to obtain incredible pictures of Spider-Man. Gargan's efforts set off Peter's spider-sense, and the teen easily evades the detective. Jameson then decides to hire Gargan as the subject of a barely-tested process that would endow him with the useful characteristics of a particular animal with the help of Farley Stillwell. Stillwell also outfits him with a club-like mechanical tail. In this case, a scorpion is the base for the purposes of creating a powerful agent capable of defeating Spider-Man, as the scorpion is a predator of the spider. Scorpion proves to be more than a match for Spider-Man, defeating him twice, but the mutagenic treatment seriously affects Gargan's mind, driving him insane as the predatory instincts of the scorpion take over. He promptly turns on his benefactor but Spider-Man intervenes, and finally defeats Scorpion in their third battle. Scorpion becomes a professional criminal and returns to indulge in a vendetta against Spider-Man and Jameson.

Scorpion fights Ms. Marvel after a botched revenge attempt against Jameson; Scorpion becomes more psychotic than usual after this, resulting in his being dumped in acid. His sanity deteriorating, Scorpion comes to believe that his costume cannot be taken off. After a quick encounter, Spider-Man proves that his belief of being a monster is only in his mind.

Scorpion's constant defeats at the hands of Spider-Man drive him to depression. He wanders the sewers, his mind becoming clearer than it had been since his transformation, and decides to quit being Scorpion. He encounters a depressed and crisis-ridden Spider-Man. Ignoring Gargan's plea that he is a changed man, Spider-Man beats him savagely. In his next appearance, Gargan is back to being psychopathic. He battles and is defeated by Spider-Man's clone Ben Reilly.

=== Venom ===
Later on, through unknown circumstances, Norman Osborn reveals Spider-Man's true identity to Gargan and gives him orders to kidnap Peter's Aunt May should Osborn ever be captured and imprisoned. When Spider-Man defeats Osborn, he is imprisoned and Gargan carries out Osborn's orders in kidnapping May. Gargan eventually summons Peter and tells him the only way he can see his aunt again is to break Osborn out of jail. Shortly thereafter, the Venom symbiote approaches Gargan, offering him new abilities, and Gargan becomes bonded with the creature. This would later give him an extra edge as part of Norman Osborn's Sinister Twelve. As Venom, Gargan joins the Thunderbolts, utilizing electrical implants to keep Venom in check. Gargan expresses fear of the control the symbiote possesses over him, yet becomes addicted to its power.

=== Dark Reign ===
Norman Osborn forms the Dark Avengers, providing new identities to some of his former Thunderbolts. After feeding a Skrull to a hungry Venom that has become more bestial than human, Osborn gives him a medication that resets the symbiote to the size it was when it possessed Spider-Man originally. Gargan can transform into a larger Venom form at will.

Norman introduces Gargan and the symbiote as "Spider-Man" of the Dark Avengers. During their first mission against Morgana le Fay, Morgana transforms "Venom-Spidey" into a giant, demonic monster who then tries to eat Ares. Venom later coughs up Ares; however, Morgana's magic continues to affect Venom, causing him to lose control of himself randomly.

=== "Siege" ===
During the "Siege" storyline, Mac Gargan is with the Dark Avengers when Norman Osborn makes plans to invade Asgard. Mac Gargan and the rest of the Avengers protest. For fighting alongside the Initiative, Osborn promises to give the team their freedom from servitude. As a result, Gargan is among the mass of soldiers to launch an attack on Asgard following Loki's setup. He and the rest of the Avengers manage to overwhelm Thor. While fighting Ms. Marvel and Spider-Man after they arrive, Gargan is forcefully separated from Venom.

=== Return as Scorpion ===
During the "Big Time" storyline, Mac Gargan is seen at the Raft prison, having been separated from Venom; the symbiote's removal was causing medical problems due to the side effects from his original genetic mutation. Alistair Smythe breaks him out of the Raft. Gargan is then fitted with a new Scorpion suit by Smythe, which includes a life-support system to stabilize Gargan's condition. Smythe convinces Gargan to join him in his plan for revenge on J. Jonah Jameson.

During the "Dying Wish" storyline, Scorpion hears the call-to-arms from Peter Parker (while trapped in Doctor Octopus' dying body) to save him and apprehend Otto Octavius (occupying Spider-Man's body) in order to save his loved ones from Octavius' final sinister scheme. Scorpion and Hydro-Man accompany Parker to Stark Industries to look for Tony Stark only to end up in a trap set by Octavius. When finding a safe area containing Spider-Man's friends and relatives, Scorpion plans to have his final revenge on J. Jonah Jameson. Upon accessing the memories of Spider-Man loving Aunt May – and the times Scorpion threatened her – Octavius retaliates by punching Scorpion, breaking off his jaw. Scorpion is later seen in the Raft's infirmary, having been given a metallic apparatus that replaces his missing jaw.

In a prelude to the "Hunted" storyline, Scorpion is among the animal-themed characters who are captured for Kraven the Hunter's Great Hunt. He is grouped with several of the other prisoners as the Savage Six.

During the "Carnage Reigns" storyline, Scorpion joined Agent Julia Gao's Cape-Killers.

== Powers and abilities ==
=== As Scorpion ===
As the Scorpion, Mac Gargan was given superhuman powers through chemical and radiological treatments, which included splicing his genetics with a scorpion's DNA. As the result, he has arachnid-like powers similar to Spider-Man's such as superhuman strength, stamina, and durability, as well as superhuman speed, agility, and reflexes. He can scale walls and also punches holes in walls as a way to climb. He possesses an exceptionally strong grip, reminiscent of a real scorpion's pincers. He wears a full-body battlesuit composed of two layers of light steel mesh separated by a thin layer of insulated rubber. In addition to his superhuman physique, he was traditionally armed with a cybernetically-controlled, seven-foot mechanical tail, with a tool steel articulated framework which can whip at 90 miles per hour. The tail has in the past been equipped with projectile weapons, usually an electric generator, although it has also been equipped with a spike at its tip, which can squirt an acidic spray, and a low-density plasma energy projector. The Scorpion can use his tail as an extra leg, or he can coil it behind him to spring himself a distance of at least 30 feet. The Scorpion is substantially stronger and more durable than Spider-Man, though is a much less skilled hand-to-hand combatant, and thus Spider-Man relies on his tactics and wits to defeat him.

=== As Venom ===
With the Venom symbiote, Mac Gargan retains his superhuman abilities, some of which have increased substantially beyond the original levels. The costume can even emulate the tail of Gargan's Scorpion costume. It can also be used as a fifth limb. As Venom, Gargan has gained the ability to shoot webbing and climb walls like Spider-Man, and can disguise himself as other people or blend in with his background. He is undetectable by Spider-Man's "spider-sense". His skill as a hand-to-hand combatant has increased due to the influence of the alien symbiote, which has superior instincts and fighting experience. The costume can also heal grave injuries suffered by the host with incredible speed. Gargan (as Venom) has claws on his fingers which can be used as weapons to slash his foes. He can also create tendrils to incapacitate his enemies.

When injured or enraged, Venom now has the ability to increase its mass and physical strength to meet whatever threat it is facing with equal force, an ability inconsistently hinted in the past.

=== As Spider-Man ===
A special "medication" provided by Norman Osborn allowed Venom to assume a smaller, more human-looking form similar to when Spider-Man had control of the symbiote. From this form, he is able to switch back to his larger, more feral form whenever he pleases. As Spider-Man, Mac is even more agile than when he was as Venom. He also still has all of Venom's powers, minus the claws, tongue, and teeth, which he can regrow at will. His "medication" has also been shown to decrease his will to fight, making him more sympathetic.

=== Return as Scorpion ===
After Alistair Smythe breaks him out of the Raft, Gargan is fitted with a new Scorpion suit. The suit is larger than its predecessor, and cybernetically wired into Gargan, making him a cyborg. It is equipped with a more powerful tail, mechanical pincers, and is bulletproof. Smythe also altered Gargan's biology, giving him a "scorpion-sense" to match Spider-Man's spider-sense. The suit is also very tough, allowing Gargan to withstand a fall at terminal speed. The armor leaves Gargan's jaw unprotected, which Doctor Octopus exploited to punch his jaw off. Following his employment by Alchemax, he has gained a new jaw to replace the one he lost.

== Characterization ==
=== Personality ===
Before he assumed the identity of the Scorpion, Mac Gargan was a skilled, if somewhat greedy and unscrupulous, private investigator, who admitted that he would go through anything "just so long as the pay is good!" His greed still motivated him as a supervillain, albeit in a twisted way: while awaiting an official "offer" from the Thunderbolts, Gargan squeezed his agent for financial details on a proposed deal, demanded certain talent for the writing, and, finally, Gargan killed six "capekiller" S.H.I.E.L.D. agents sent to bring him in – because while he intended to cooperate, his agent had told him that the rights to his life story would be "worth a little more" if Gargan "goosed up the body count" before joining the Thunderbolts.

He is emotionally disturbed as a result of the procedure in which he acquired his powers, and retains little of his former rationality. He is typically easily outsmarted by Spider-Man and is not very good at cooperating with other supervillains or following instructions as Justin Hammer learned. His most prominent weakness is his explosive temper and irrational hatred toward J. Jonah Jameson, to the point where he has been known to ignore the orders of whomever he is working for, in order to attack the Daily Bugle's publisher. None of this has changed with his bonding to the Venom symbiote, or with his new career serving under Norman Osborn with the Thunderbolts or the Dark Avengers: in fact, the symbiote seems to have only made him even more irrational, and his new career as a "hero" has done nothing to curtail his lingering hatred of Jameson. He nearly blew his cover as Spider-Man when he started a drug war and photographs of him engaging in cannibalism wound up in J. Jonah Jameson's hands, putting his employer Norman Osborn's plans and the "heroic" status of his entire Dark Avengers team in jeopardy, just to pursue vengeance against Jameson (now the Mayor of New York) yet again. His ill-conceived and poorly thought-out plan failed, and he was forced to publicly make peace with Jameson in his Spider-Man guise, greatly embarrassing him, though he secretly fantasized about killing Jameson during the whole time while they were shaking hands.

The years of being outsmarted and beaten, despite his physical superiority over Spider-Man, complement the similar hatred possessed by the symbiote, and has allowed it to almost completely control Gargan. Gargan has even engaged in cannibalism as Venom, severing and devouring the arm of Steel Spider. After getting "the taste of flesh", he is seen displaying even more signs of cannibalism such as eating Skrulls, consuming the bones of Swarm, devouring Eleven and the limbs of criminals, and trying to eat Ares. Unlike Eddie Brock, any inhibitions Gargan had about harming innocent bystanders has been eliminated with his bonding to the symbiote, most likely because he had such little regard for others to begin with.

== Reception ==
Marc Buxton of Den of Geek called Mac Gargan "one of Spidey's greatest foes." David Caballero of Digital Trends described Mac Gargan as one of Spider-Man's "most interesting villain." Pierce Lydon of Newsarama named Mac Gargan one of the "best Venom hosts of all time from comics." Comic Book Resources referred to Mac Gargan as one of Spider-Man's "coolest villains," and one of the "most Iconic Spider-Man villains." Drew Beaty of Screen Rant found Mac Gargan to be one of the "best Marvel legacy villains." Mark Lynch of FanSided described Mac Gargan as a "memorable Venom" and one of the "greatest characters" associated with the vilain.

Ethan Stewart of Collider included Mac Gargan in their "10 Spider-Man Villains Fans Want to See in the MCU" list, saying, "Since 2017, fans have been wondering when Scorpion will fully be brought into live-action." IGN ranked Mac Gargan 10th in their "Top 25 Spider-Man Villains" list, naming him the "most iconic villain to call himself Scorpion." Tom Bowen of Game Rant ranked Mac Gargan 11th in their "28 Best Spider-Man Villains Of All Time" list.

== Other versions ==
Many alternate universe versions of Mac Gargan have appeared throughout the character's publication history.

=== Exiles ===
In Exiles, Gargan is a heroic member of Heroes for Hire before he is killed by Magik.

=== Spider-Man: Reign ===
In Spider-Man: Reign, Gargan is a member of the Sinner Six before he is killed in battle with Spider-Man.

=== Spider-Verse ===
In Spider-Verse, Gargan is a member of Verna's Hounds.

=== Ultimate Marvel ===
In the Ultimate Marvel universe, Gargan – known as Maximus Gargan – is a Mexican mob boss who worked with Prowler.

== In other media ==
=== Television ===
- Mac Gargan / Scorpion appears in Spider-Man (1967), voiced by Carl Banas. This version's villainous nature was amplified when Farley Stillwell turned him into the Scorpion.
- Mac Gargan / Scorpion appears in the Spider-Man and His Amazing Friends episode "Attack of the Arachnoid", voiced by Neil Ross.
- Mac Gargan / Scorpion appears in Spider-Man: The Animated Series, voiced initially by Martin Landau and later by Richard Moll. This version is initially a neurotic, corpulent, and balding private eye working for J. Jonah Jameson. In an attempt to discover Spider-Man's identity, Jameson convinces Gargan to allow Dr. Farley Stillwell to use the Neogenic Recombinator to transform him. As the Scorpion, Gargan defeats Spider-Man, but is then overcome with pain as he undergoes uncontrolled mutations that give him green skin, fangs and claws. Driven insane and believing more radiation will return him to normal, Gargan attempts to gain access to a nuclear reactor and destroy New York in the process, but is defeated by Spider-Man and arrested. In later appearances, Gargan joins two incarnations of the Kingpin's Insidious Six and kidnaps the Vulture, believing he is smart enough to help change him back, only to be defeated by Spider-Man.
- Mac Gargan / Scorpion appears in Ultimate Spider-Man, voiced initially by Dante Basco and later by Eric Bauza. This version is a composite character with elements of Steel Serpent who is a rival of Iron Fist, a member of the Sinister Six, and a temporary host of the Venom symbiote.
- Mac Gargan / Scorpion appears in Marvel's Spider-Man (2017), voiced by Jason Spisak.

=== Film ===
Maximus Gargan / Scorpion appears in Spider-Man: Into the Spider-Verse, voiced by Joaquín Cosío. This version is a cybernetically-enhanced Hispanic gangster that resembles a cybernetic scorpion man.

=== Marvel Cinematic Universe ===
Mac Gargan appears in the Marvel Cinematic Universe, portrayed by Michael Mando. He is introduced in Spider-Man: Homecoming as a criminal with a scorpion tattoo on his neck who is captured by Spider-Man. In Spider-Man: Brand New Day, Gargan has become the supervillain Scorpion, wielding a suit of armor equipped with a mechanized scorpion-like tail.

- An alternate timeline version of Mac Gargan appears in Your Friendly Neighborhood Spider-Man, voiced by Jonathan Medina. This version is the leader of the Scorpions gang who later receives scorpion-themed armor from Otto Octavius.

=== Video games ===
- Mac Gargan / Scorpion appears as a boss in The Amazing Spider-Man (1990).
- Mac Gargan / Scorpion appears in Spider-Man 2: The Sinister Six as a member of the eponymous team.
- Mac Gargan / Scorpion appears in Spider-Man: The Video Game.
- Mac Gargan / Scorpion appears as a boss in Spider-Man (1995).
- Mac Gargan / Scorpion appears as a boss in Spider-Man: Lethal Foes.
- Mac Gargan / Scorpion appears as the first boss of Spider-Man (2000), voiced by Daran Norris.
- Mac Gargan / Scorpion appears as a boss in Spider-Man (2002), voiced by Michel McColl. This version is portrayed as a tragic figure, traumatized and on the run from the people who were responsible for his mutation.
- Mac Gargan / Scorpion appears as a boss in Spider-Man: Mysterio's Menace.
- Mac Gargan / Scorpion appears in Marvel: Ultimate Alliance, voiced by Beau Weaver. This version is a member of Doctor Doom's Masters of Evil. Additionally, the "Villain Pack" DLC introduces Gargan's Venom form as an alternate costume for Eddie Brock.
- Mac Gargan / Scorpion appears in Spider-Man 3, voiced by Dee Bradley Baker. Similarly to his 2002 video game self, this version is a tragic antihero who enlists Spider-Man's help in freeing him from the control of MechaBioCon, a megacorporation that seeks to weaponize his powers.
- Mac Gargan / Scorpion appears as a boss and playable character in Spider-Man: Friend or Foe, voiced by Fred Tatasciore.
- Mac Gargan / Venom appears as an unlockable playable character and boss in Marvel: Ultimate Alliance 2, voiced by Jim Cummings. He is among the villains who are placed under mind control via nanite technology to serve the heroes' cause and can be either on the pro- or anti-registration side.
- Mac Gargan / Venom appears in Marvel Avengers Alliance. This version is a member of Dell Rusk's Dark Avengers.
- Mac Gargan / Scorpion appears as a boss in The Amazing Spider-Man (2012).
- Mac Gargan / Venom appears as a playable character in Spider-Man Unlimited.
- Mac Gargan / Scorpion appears as a playable character in Lego Marvel Super Heroes 2.
- Mac Gargan / Scorpion appears as a boss in Spider-Man (2018), voiced again by Jason Spisak. This version is a mercenary who has encountered and fought Spider-Man in the past. After being broken out of the Raft and joining Doctor Octopus' Sinister Six, Gargan reluctantly works with the Rhino before the duo are defeated by Spider-Man.
- Mac Gargan as Venom and Scorpion appear as separate playable characters in Marvel Puzzle Quest.
- Mac Gargan / Scorpion appears in Marvel Snap.
- Mac Gargan / Scorpion appears in Spider-Man 2 (2023), voiced again by Jason Spisak. Amidst a prison transfer, he is captured and later killed by Kraven the Hunter.
