= List of best-selling game consoles by region =

This is a list of best-selling game consoles by region. This page consists of countries in Asia, North America, Europe, and other regions.

Background shading indicates video game consoles on the market.

# indicates Eighth & Ninth generation consoles. (These consoles are either currently for sale, or recently finished sale and numbers may not be final)

== Asia ==
=== Region-wide ===
Platform	Type	Company	Released	Units sold	Date of figure	Ref.
PlayStation 2	Home	Sony	March 4, 2000	25,420,000	March 2007	
PlayStation	Home	Sony	December 3, 1994	21,590,000	March 2007	
Dreamcast	Home	Sega	November 27, 1998	2,860,000	March 31, 2002	(Note: Dreamcast Official Sales Figures SEGA ANNUAL REPORT 1999 (external source) (March 31, 1999): Japan: 900,000; SEGA ANNUAL REPORT 2000 (March 31, 2000): Japan: 950,000; US: 2,500,000; Europe: 1,040,000; other Asian Regions: 160,000; SEGA ANNUAL REPORT 2001 (March 31, 2001): Japan: 470,000; US: 1,780,000; Europe: 930,000; Asia (outside Japan): 210,000; SEGA SEMIANNUAL REPORT 2002 (external source) (September 30, 2001): Japan: 130,000; US: 530,000; Remaining Inventory, most likely depleted by March 31, 2002: Japan: 40,000; US: 230,000)
Xbox	Home	Microsoft	February 22, 2002	1,800,000 (Note: Estimate)	June 2005	

=== Asia Excluding Japan ===
Platform	Type	Company	Released	Units sold	Date of figure	Ref.
Nintendo Switch #	Hybrid	Nintendo	March 3, 2017	2,259,000	2018	
Nintendo 3DS	Handheld	Nintendo	February 26, 2011	1,047,760	2018	
Dreamcast	Home	Sega	1999	370,000	March 31, 2001	

=== Japan ===
Platform	Type	Company	Released	Units sold	Date of figure	Ref.
Nintendo Switch #	Hybrid	Nintendo	March 3, 2017	38,670,000	September 30, 2026	
Nintendo DS	Handheld	Nintendo	December 2, 2004	32,990,000	March 2013	
Game Boy Game Boy Color	Handheld	Nintendo	April 21, 1989; October 21, 1998	32,470,000	March 2003	
Nintendo 3DS	Handheld	Nintendo	February 26, 2011	25,260,000	March 2020	
PlayStation 2	Home	Sony	March 4, 2000	24,420,000	2008	
Game Boy	Handheld	Nintendo	April 21, 1989	21,460,000	March 2000	
PlayStation Portable	Handheld	Sony	December 12, 2004	19,632,197	December 14, 2014	Famitsu
PlayStation	Home	Sony	December 3, 1994	19,411,000	2005	
Family Computer	Home	Nintendo	July 15, 1983	19,350,000	March 2004	
Super Famicom	Home	Nintendo	November 21, 1990	17,170,000	March 2004	
Game Boy Advance	Handheld	Nintendo	March 21, 2001	16,960,000	March 2009	
Game & Watch	Handheld	Nintendo	April 28, 1980	12,870,000	April 15, 2010	
Wii	Home	Nintendo	December 2, 2006	12,750,000	March 2014	
PlayStation 3	Home	Sony	November 11, 2006	10,274,113	December 31, 2017	Famitsu
PlayStation 4	Home	Sony	February 22, 2014	9,506,149	March 29, 2026	Famitsu
PC Engine	Home	NEC	October 30, 1987	8,000,000	?	
PlayStation 5 #	Home	Sony	November 12, 2020	7,663,484	August 2, 2026	Famitsu
Nintendo Switch 2 #	Hybrid	Nintendo	June 5, 2025	7,070,000	September 30, 2026	
Game Boy Color	Handheld	Nintendo	October 21, 1998	6,680,000	March 2000	
PlayStation Vita	Handheld	Sony	December 17, 2011	5,863,022	December 29, 2019	Famitsu
Sega Saturn	Home	Sega	November 22, 1994	5,800,000	2000	
Nintendo 64	Home	Nintendo	June 23, 1996	5,540,000	March 2008	
Family Computer Disk System	Peripheral	Nintendo	February 21, 1986	4,500,000	?	
GameCube	Home	Nintendo	September 14, 2001	4,040,000	September 2008	
Mega Drive	Home	Sega	October 29, 1988	3,590,000	1997	
Wii U	Home	Nintendo	December 8, 2012	3,340,000	December 31, 2016	
Color TV-Game	Dedicated	Nintendo	June 1, 1977	3,000,000	1993	
Dreamcast	Home	Sega	November 27, 1998	2,526,000	2002	
Game Gear	Handheld	Sega	October 6, 1990	1,980,000	1996	
PC Engine Duo CD·ROM^{2}	Home; Add-on	NEC	December 4, 1988; September 21, 1991	1,920,000	March 1996	
WonderSwan	Handheld	Bandai	March 4, 1999	1,803,092	April 1, 2004	Famitsu
Xbox 360	Home	Microsoft	December 10, 2005	1,614,940	August 31, 2014	Famitsu
Sega Mark III (Master System)	Home	Sega	October 20, 1985	1,000,000	1986	
Mega CD	Add-on	Sega	December 12, 1991	850,000	1994	
3DO Interactive Multiplayer	Home	Panasonic	March 20, 1994	750,000	1996	
Xbox Series X # Xbox Series S #	Home	Microsoft	November 10, 2020	704,295	July 26, 2026	Famitsu
Atari Lynx	Handheld	Atari	September 1, 1989	500,000	1991	
Xbox	Home	Microsoft	February 22, 2002	472,994	April 12, 2005	Famitsu
SG-1000	Home	Sega	July 15, 1983	400,000	?	
Neo Geo Pocket	Handheld	SNK	October 28, 1998	311,315	July 29, 2001	Famitsu
Super Cassette Vision	Home	Epoch	1984	300,000	1986	
Cassette Vision	Home	Epoch	1981	300,000	1986	
PC-FX	Home	NEC	December 23, 1994	300,000	1997	
32X	Add-on	Sega	December 3, 1994	270,000	1994	
TV Baseball	Dedicated	Epoch	1978	230,000	1986	
System 10	Dedicated	Epoch	1977	200,000	1986	
Family Computer Network System	Peripheral	Nintendo	1988	150,000	1989	
Xbox One	Home	Microsoft	September 4, 2014	140,700	June 2019	
Virtual Boy	Handheld	Nintendo	July 21, 1995	140,000	March 1996	
TV Tennis	Dedicated	Epoch	1975	10,000	1986	
Jaguar	Home	Atari	December 8, 1994	2,000	March 1995	

=== China ===
Platform	Type	Company	Released	Units sold	Date of figure	Ref.
Nintendo Switch #	Hybrid	Nintendo	2019	4,000,000	January 2021	
PlayStation 4	Home	Sony	2015	3,520,000	December 2020	
Xbox One	Home	Microsoft	2014	1,240,000	December 2020	

=== Middle East ===
Platform	Type	Company	Released	Units sold	Date of figure	Ref.
PlayStation 2	Home	Sony	2003	5,200,000	March 2010	
PlayStation Portable	Handheld	Sony	September 1, 2005	5,200,000	March 2010	
Nintendo DS	Handheld	Nintendo	2005	850,000	March 2010	
PlayStation 3	Home	Sony	?	450,000	March 2010	
Wii	Home	Nintendo	?	315,000	March 2010	
Xbox 360	Home	Microsoft	?	180,000	March 2010	

=== South Korea ===
Older consoles have different names in South Korea and had local Korean manufacturers.

Platform	Type	Company	Released	Units sold	Date of figure	Ref.
Nintendo Switch #	Hybrid	Nintendo	December 1, 2017	>2,314,955	December 31, 2021	
PlayStation 4	Home	Sony	December 2013	>1,100,000	December 31, 2019	
PlayStation 2	Home	Sony	February 22, 2002	1,000,000	October 2004	
Gam*Boy / Aladdin Boy (Master System)	Home	Samsung; Sega	April 1989	730,000	1993	
Zemmix	Home	Daewoo	1985	415,000	1992	
Comboy (Nintendo Entertainment System)	Home	Hyundai; Nintendo	December 1989	360,000	1993	
Super Gam*Boy / Super Aladdin Boy (Mega Drive)	Home	Samsung; Sega	1990	194,000	1993	
Super Comboy (Super Nintendo Entertainment System)	Home	Hyundai; Nintendo	1992	80,000	1993	

== Americas ==
=== Region-wide ===
Platform	Type	Company	Released	Units sold	Date of figure	Ref.
Nintendo Switch #	Hybrid	Nintendo	March 3, 2017	60,130,000	September 30, 2026	
Nintendo DS	Handheld	Nintendo	November 21, 2004	59,930,000	September 2013	
Wii	Home	Nintendo	November 19, 2006	48,640,000	March 2015	
Game Boy Game Boy Color	Handheld	Nintendo	July 31, 1989; November 18, 1998	44,060,000	March 2002	
Game Boy Advance	Handheld	Nintendo	June 11, 2001	41,640,000	March 2008	
Nintendo Entertainment System	Home	Nintendo	October 18, 1985	34,000,000	March 1997	
Nintendo 3DS	Handheld	Nintendo	March 27, 2011	26,900,000	March 2026	
Super Nintendo Entertainment System	Home	Nintendo	August 23, 1991	23,350,000	March 2001	
Nintendo 64	Home	Nintendo	September 29, 1996	20,630,000	March 2003	
GameCube	Home	Nintendo	November 18, 2001	12,940,000	March 2008	
Nintendo Switch 2 #	Hybrid	Nintendo	June 5, 2025	9,000,000	September 30, 2026	
Wii U	Home	Nintendo	November 18, 2012	6,490,000	December 31, 2016	

=== North America ===
Console	Type	Company	Released	Units sold	Date of figure	Ref.
PlayStation 2	Home	Sony	October 26, 2000	50,000,000	January 13, 2009	
PlayStation	Home	Sony	September 9, 1995	40,780,000	December 31, 2004	
Xbox	Home	Microsoft	November 15, 2001	14,600,000	June 2005	
Dreamcast	Home	Sega	September 9, 1999	4,640,000	March 2002	
PlayStation 5 #	Home	Sony	November 12, 2020	3,100,000	November 2020	
Master System	Home	Sega	September 1986	1,800,000	March 31, 1991	
Sega Saturn	Home	Sega	May 11, 1995	1,800,000	March 1999	

==== Canada ====
Platform	Type	Company	Released	Units sold	Date of figure	Ref.
PlayStation 5 #	Home	Sony	November 12, 2020	1,500,000	2020	
Nintendo 64	Home	Nintendo	September 29, 1996	1,300,000	1999	
Wii	Home	Nintendo	November 19, 2006	1,060,000	2008	
Xbox 360	Home	Microsoft	November 22, 2005	870,000	2008	
PlayStation 3	Home	Sony	November 17, 2006	520,000	2008	

==== Mexico ====
Platform	Type	Company	Released	Units sold	Date of figure	Ref.
PlayStation 2	Home	Sony	2004	860,000	2007	
Xbox One	Home	Microsoft	2013	700,000	2020	

==== United States ====
Platform	Type	Company	Released	Units sold	Date of figure	Ref.
Nintendo DS	Handheld	Nintendo	November 21, 2004	53,800,000	June 2014	
Nintendo Switch #	Hybrid	Nintendo	March 3, 2017	46,600,000	December 18, 2024	
Xbox 360	Home	Microsoft	November 22, 2005	43,201,000	December 31, 2016	
PlayStation 2	Home	Sony	October 26, 2000	43,000,000	November 2008	
Wii	Home	Nintendo	November 19, 2006	40,000,000	January 2, 2016	
Game Boy Game Boy Color	Handheld	Nintendo	July 31, 1989; November 18, 1998	38,200,000	June 2014	
Game Boy Advance	Handheld	Nintendo	June 11, 2001	35,700,000	April 2007	
PlayStation 4	Home	Sony	November 15, 2013	34,950,000	December 31, 2022	
Nintendo Entertainment System	Home	Nintendo	October 18, 1985	33,290,000	March 1993	
PlayStation	Home	Sony	September 9, 1995	30,400,000	December 2013	
Xbox One	Home	Microsoft	November 22, 2013	28,980,000	January 1, 2022	
PlayStation 3	Home	Sony	November 15, 2006	26,834,000	December 31, 2016	
PlayStation 5 #	Home	Sony	November 12, 2020	26,700,000	October 4, 2025	
Game Boy	Handheld	Nintendo	July 31, 1989	23,500,000	March 2000	
Nintendo 3DS	Handheld	Nintendo	March 27, 2011	23,342,000	January 2, 2021	
PlayStation Portable	Handheld	Sony	March 24, 2005	20,200,000	June 2014	
Super Nintendo Entertainment System	Home	Nintendo	August 23, 1991	20,000,000	December 2013	
Sega Genesis	Home	Sega	1989	20,000,000	March 1998	
Nintendo 64	Home	Nintendo	September 29, 1996	18,000,000	December 2013	
Xbox Series X # Xbox Series S #	Home	Microsoft	November 10, 2020	>14,500,000	August 7, 2024	
Xbox	Home	Microsoft	November 15, 2001	14,500,000	February 2008	
Nintendo GameCube	Home	Nintendo	November 18, 2001	11,700,000	April 2007	
Game Boy Color	Handheld	Nintendo	November 18, 1998	10,400,000	March 2000	
Atari 2600	Home	Atari	1977	10,000,000	1982	
Wii U	Home	Nintendo	November 18, 2012	5,495,000	December 31, 2016	
Dreamcast	Home	Sega	September 9, 1999	5,040,000	March 31, 2002	
Nintendo Switch 2 #	Hybrid	Nintendo	June 5, 2025	4,400,000	January 3, 2026	
TurboGrafx-16 (PC Engine)	Home	NEC; Hudson Soft	August 29, 1989	2,500,000	1991	
PlayStation Vita	Handheld	Sony	February 2012	2,441,000	December 31, 2016	
Master System	Home	Sega	September 1986	2,000,000	?	
Atari 7800	Home	Atari	May 1986	2,000,000	June 13, 1988	
Sega Saturn	Home	Sega	May 11, 1995	1,281,934	2000	
Sega CD	Add-on	Sega	October 15, 1992	1,500,000	1994	
Philips CD-i	Home	Philips	1990	350,000+	1994	
Atari XEGS	Home	Atari	1987	100,000	May 1988	

=== Brazil ===
Platform	Type	Company	Released	Units sold	Date of figure	Ref.
Master System	Home	Tectoy; Sega	September 4, 1989	>8,000,000	2015	
Mega Drive	Home	Tectoy; Sega	1990	>3,000,000	2012	

== Europe ==
=== Region-wide ===
Platform	Type	Company	Released	Units sold	Date of figure	Ref.
PlayStation 2	Home	Sony	November 24, 2000	48,000,000	May 2008	
Nintendo Switch #	Hybrid	Nintendo	March 3, 2017	40,220,000	September 30, 2026	(Note: Before June 2019, European Switch sales were not given a separate section on Nintendo's financial statements.)
PlayStation	Home	Sony	September 29, 1995	40,120,000	March 2007	
Nintendo DS	Handheld	Nintendo	March 11, 2005	38,100,000	March 2009	
Wii	Home	Nintendo	December 8, 2006	30,000,000+	December 2011	
PlayStation 3	Home	Sony	March 23, 2007	25,980,000	June 2015	
Xbox 360	Home	Microsoft	December 2, 2005	20,860,000	June 2015	
Mega Drive	Home	Sega	September 1990	8,320,000+	October 1996	(Note: Mega Drive install base/sales in Western Europe: Belgium – 160,000 (1994); France – 1,300,000 (1994); Germany – 800,000 (1994); Italy – 400,000 (1994); Netherlands – 160,000 (1994); Spain – 600,000 (1994); United Kingdom – 3,000,000 (June 1996); Other countries – 1,900,000 (1994))
Nintendo Entertainment System	Home	Nintendo	September 1986	8,025,000+	December 1994	(Note: NES install base/sales in Western Europe: Belgium – 220,000 (1993); France – 2,400,000 (1992); Germany – 1,200,000 (1993); Italy – 500,000 (1992); Netherlands – 400,000 (1993); Spain – 440,000 (1993); United Kingdom – 1,150,000 (October 1993); Other countries – 1,760,000 (1992))
Master System	Home	Sega	June 1987	6,800,000+	December 1994	(Note: Master System install base in Western Europe: Belgium – 600,000 (1991); France – 1,600,000 (1993); Germany – 700,000 (1993); Italy – 400,000 (1992); Netherlands – 200,000 (1993); Spain – 550,000 (1993); United Kingdom – 1,350,000 (1993); Other countries – 1,400,000 (1993))
Dendy	Home	Micro Genius	1992	6,000,000	1998	
Nintendo Switch 2 #	Hybrid	Nintendo	June 5, 2025	5,850,000	September 30, 2026	
Xbox	Home	Microsoft	March 14, 2002	5,500,000	June 2005	
Super Nintendo Entertainment System	Home	Nintendo	1992	5,280,000+	1998	(Note: SNES install base/sales in Western Europe: Belgium – 70,000 (1994); France – 1,000,000 (1994); Germany – 1,400,000 (1994); Italy – 200,000 (1994); Netherlands – 130,000 (1994); Spain – 630,000 (1998); United Kingdom – 1,050,000 (1994); Other countries – 500,000 (1994))
Nintendo 64	Home	Nintendo	March 1, 1997	4,500,000	January 1999	
Dreamcast	Home	Sega	October 14, 1999	1,970,000	March 31, 2001	
Sega Saturn	Home	Sega	July 8, 1995	1,000,000	March 1999	

=== Western Europe ===
Platform	Type	Company	Released	Units sold	Date of figure	Ref.
Mega Drive	Home	Sega	September 1990	8,320,000+	June 1996	
Nintendo Entertainment System	Home	Nintendo	September 1986	8,025,000	1994	
Master System	Home	Sega	June 1987	6,800,000	1994	
Super Nintendo Entertainment System	Home	Nintendo	June 1992	5,280,000+	1998	
Mega CD	Add-on	Sega	April 2, 1993	415,000	1994	

==== France ====
Platform	Type	Company	Released	Units sold	Date of figure	Ref.
Nintendo DS	Handheld	Nintendo	March 11, 2005	10,596,000	2016	
Nintendo Switch #	Hybrid	Nintendo	March 3, 2017	7,090,000	January 2023	
Wii	Home	Nintendo	December 8, 2006	6,400,000	2015	
PlayStation 4	Home	Sony	November 29, 2013	6,000,000	January 2023	
PlayStation 2	Home	Sony	2000	5,900,000	2009	
PlayStation 3	Home	Sony	March 23, 2007	5,235,000	2016	
Nintendo 3DS	Handheld	Nintendo	March 25, 2011	4,765,000	2016	
PlayStation Portable	Handheld	Sony	September 1, 2005	3,582,000	2016	
Game Boy	Handheld	Nintendo	September 28, 1990	3,500,000+	March 2000	
Xbox 360	Home	Microsoft	December 2, 2005	3,379,000	2016	
Nintendo Entertainment System	Home	Nintendo	1986	2,400,000	1994	
Master System	Home	Sega	1987	1,600,000	1993	
Mega Drive	Home	Sega	1990	1,300,000	1994	
Super Nintendo Entertainment System	Home	Nintendo	1992	1,000,000	1994	
Xbox One	Home	Microsoft	November 22, 2013	1,026,000	2016	
Wii U	Home	Nintendo	November 30, 2012	832,000	2016	
Amiga	Computer	Commodore	April 1986	700,000	1994	
Atari VCS / 2600	Home	Atari	1982	600,000	1989	
PlayStation Vita	Handheld	Sony	February 22, 2012	535,000	2016	
Philips CD-i	Home	Philips	1990	403,000+	1994	(Note: CD-i install base in Western Europe: Belgium – 25,000 (1994); France – 60,000 (1994); Germany – 40,000 (1994); Italy – 20,000 (1994); Netherlands – 85,000 (1994); Spain – 18,000 (1994); United Kingdom – 100,000 (1994); Other countries – 55,000 (1994))
Game Gear	Handheld	Sega	April 1991	300,000	1995	
Sega Saturn	Home	Sega	July 7, 1995	300,000	May 1998	
Dreamcast	Home	Sega	October 14, 1999	>235,000	February 2001	
Neo Geo	Home	SNK	1991	100,000	1995	
Mega CD	Add-on	Sega	1993	65,000	1994	
Atari XEGS	Home	Atari	1989	30,000	1989	
Super Cassette Vision	Home	Epoch; Yeno	1985	>17,800	1986	

==== Germany ====
Platform	Type	Company	Released	Units sold	Date of figure	Ref.
Game Boy	Handheld	Nintendo	September 1990	10,300,000	March 2000	
Nintendo DS	Handheld	Nintendo	March 11, 2005	8,100,000	August 2012	
PlayStation 4	Home	Sony	November 29, 2013	7,200,000	September 2019	
PlayStation 2	Home	Sony	November 24, 2000	6,000,000	August 2009	
Wii	Home	Nintendo	December 8, 2006	5,200,000	August 2012	
PlayStation 3	Home	Sony	March 23, 2007	4,540,000	June 2015	
PlayStation	Home	Sony	September 1995	4,000,000	October 2000	
Game Boy Color	Handheld	Nintendo	November 1998	3,600,000	March 2000	
Xbox 360	Home	Microsoft	December 2, 2005	2,840,000	June 2015	
Nintendo 3DS	Handheld	Nintendo	March 25, 2011	2,000,000	August 2014	
Nintendo 64	Home	Nintendo	March 1997	1,500,000	February 2000	
Amiga	Computer	Commodore	September 1993	25000	1994	
Super Nintendo Entertainment System	Home	Nintendo	June 6, 1992	1,400,000	1994	
Nintendo Entertainment System	Home	Nintendo	1986	1,200,000	1994	
Mega Drive	Home	Sega	November 30, 1990	900,000	1995	
Xbox One	Home	Microsoft	November 22, 2013	710,000	June 2016	
Master System	Home	Sega	September 1987	700,000	1993	
Wii U	Home	Nintendo	November 30, 2012	750,000	June 2016	
Nintendo Switch #	Hybrid	Nintendo	March 3, 2017	600,000	2017	
Atari 2600	Home	Atari	1978	450,000	1983	
Sega Saturn	Home	Sega	July 1995	200,000	1999	
Dreamcast	Home	Sega	October 1999	180,000	February 2001	
Mega CD	Add-on	Sega	1993	140,000	1994	
Intellivision	Home	Mattel	1982	100,000	1983	

==== Spain ====
Platform	Type	Company	Released	Units sold	Date of figure	Ref.
Nintendo DS	Handheld	Nintendo	March 11, 2005	5,700,000	Early 2012	
PlayStation 2	Home	Sony	November 24, 2000	5,000,000	Early 2009	
PlayStation 4	Home	Sony	November 22, 2013	3,300,000	December 2019	
PlayStation	Home	Sony	September 29, 1995	>3,000,000	July 2005	
Nintendo Switch #	Hybrid	Nintendo	March 3, 2017	3,000,000	December 2023	
PlayStation 3	Home	Sony	March 23, 2007	2,980,000	June 2015	
Wii	Home	Nintendo	December 8, 2006	2,700,000	2010	
Game Boy	Handheld	Nintendo	January 1991	2,300,000	Late 1998/Early 1999	
PlayStation Portable	Handheld	Sony	September 1, 2005	2,100,000	2008	
Nintendo 3DS	Handheld	Nintendo	March 25, 2011	2,000,000	Early 2018	
Game Boy Advance	Handheld	Nintendo	June 22, 2001	1,600,000	2004	
Xbox 360	Home	Microsoft	December 2, 2005	1,290,000	June 2015	
PlayStation 5 #	Home	Sony	November 19, 2020	1,126,000	December 2023	
Mega Drive	Home	Sega	September 1990	<700,000	1994	
Super Nintendo Entertainment System	Home	Nintendo	June 1, 1992	630,000	1998	
PlayStation Vita	Handheld	Sony	February 22, 2012	600,000	Mid 2015	
Master System	Home	Sega	1987	550,000	1993	
Nintendo Entertainment System	Home	Nintendo	1988	440,000	1993	
Nintendo Switch 2 #	Hybrid	Nintendo	June 5, 2025	312,000	January 2026	
Xbox Series X # Xbox Series S #	Home	Microsoft	November 10, 2020	310,000	December 2023	
Xbox One	Home	Microsoft	November 22, 2013	305,000~500,000	2017	
GameCube	Home	Nintendo	May 3, 2002	<300,000	2006	
Dreamcast	Home	Sega	October 14, 1999	200,000	Early 2001	
Game Gear	Handheld	Sega	1991	175,000	1992	
Sega Saturn	Home	Sega	July 7, 1995	70,000	Early 1997	
Mega CD	Add-on	Sega	1993	30,000	1994	

==== United Kingdom ====
Platform	Type	Company	Released	Units sold	Date of figure	Ref.
Nintendo DS	Handheld	Nintendo	March 11, 2005	12,300,000	2011	
PlayStation 2	Home	Sony	November 24, 2000	10,000,000	January 2010	
Xbox 360	Home	Microsoft	December 2, 2005	9,030,000	June 2015	
Wii	Home	Nintendo	December 8, 2006	8,400,000	June 27, 2013	
PlayStation 4	Home	Sony	November 29, 2013	7,723,000	March 2025	
Nintendo Switch #	Hybrid	Nintendo	March 3, 2017	7,250,000	March 2025	
PlayStation	Home	Sony	September 1995	7,190,000	December 2005	
Game Boy Game Boy Color	Handheld	Nintendo	September 28, 1990; November 23, 1998	6,630,000	December 2003	
PlayStation 3	Home	Sony	March 23, 2007	5,920,000	June 2015	
PlayStation 5 #	Home	Sony	November 19, 2020	5,600,000	March 2026	
Xbox One	Home	Microsoft	November 22, 2013	5,000,000	December 11, 2018	
Game Boy Advance	Handheld	Nintendo	June 22, 2001	4,550,000	December 2005	
Game Boy	Handheld	Nintendo	September 28, 1990	4,400,000	March 2000	
PlayStation Portable	Handheld	Sony	September 1, 2005	3,600,000	January 2010	
Mega Drive	Home	Sega	November 30, 1990	3,000,000	June 1996	
Xbox Series X # Xbox Series S #	Home	Microsoft	November 10, 2020	2,570,000	March 2025	
Xbox	Home	Microsoft	March 14, 2002	2,140,000	December 2005	
Nintendo 3DS	Handheld	Nintendo	March 25, 2011	2,100,000	2013	
Amiga	Computer	Commodore	1986	1,500,000	1993	
Nintendo 64	Home	Nintendo	March 1, 1997	1,500,000	April 2022	
Master System	Home	Sega	September 1987	1,350,000	1993	
GameCube	Home	Nintendo	May 3, 2002	1,150,000	December 2005	
Nintendo Entertainment System	Home	Nintendo	1987	1,150,000	October 1993	
Game Boy Color	Handheld	Nintendo	November 1998	1,100,000	March 2000	
Super Nintendo Entertainment System	Home	Nintendo	April 1992	1,050,000	1994	
Nintendo Switch 2 #	Hybrid	Nintendo	June 5, 2025	737,000	December 2025	
Dreamcast	Home	Sega	October 1999	600,000	2002	
Game Gear	Handheld	Sega	April 1991	591,000	December 1993	
Wii U	Home	Nintendo	November 30, 2012	560,000	2018	
PlayStation Vita	Handheld	Sony	February 22, 2012	500,000	2013	
Sega Saturn	Home	Sega	July 1995	214,460	December 1999	
Atari VCS	Home	Atari	1978	125,000	December 1980	
Mega CD	Add-on	Sega	April 2, 1993	104,000	December 1993	
Philips CD-i	Home	Philips	1990	100,000	1994	

==== Belgium ====
Platform	Type	Company	Released	Units sold	Date of figure	Ref.
Master System	Home	Sega	August 1987	600,000+	1991	
Nintendo Entertainment System	Home	Nintendo	September 1, 1986	220,000+	1993	
Mega Drive	Home	Sega	September 1990	160,000+	1994	
Super Nintendo Entertainment System	Home	Nintendo	June 1992	70,000+	1994	
Philips CD-i	Home	Philips	1990	25,000+	1994	

==== Italy ====
Platform	Type	Company	Released	Units sold	Date of figure	Ref.
Nintendo Entertainment System	Home	Nintendo	1987	500,000+	1992	
Mega Drive	Home	Sega	September 1990	400,000+	1994	
Master System	Home	Sega	August 1987	400,000+	1992	
Super Nintendo Entertainment System	Home	Nintendo	June 1992	200,000+	1994	
Philips CD-i	Home	Philips	1990	20,000+	1994	
Sega Saturn	Home	Sega	1995	<10,000	1998	

==== Netherlands ====
Platform	Type	Company	Released	Units sold	Date of figure	Ref.
Nintendo Entertainment System	Home	Nintendo	September 1, 1986	400,000+	1993	
Master System	Home	Sega	August 1987	200,000+	1993	
Mega Drive	Home	Sega	September 1990	160,000+	1994	
Super Nintendo Entertainment System	Home	Nintendo	June 1992	130,000+	1994	
Philips CD-i	Home	Philips	1990	85,000+	1994	

== Oceania ==
=== Australia ===
Platform	Type	Company	Released	Units sold	Date of figure	Ref.
PlayStation 4	Home	Sony	November 29, 2013	2,500,000	October 2018	
Nintendo DS	Handheld	Nintendo	June 1, 2006	2,500,000	January 27, 2010	
PlayStation 2	Home	Sony	November 30, 2000	2,500,000	November 24, 2008	
Wii	Home	Nintendo	December 7, 2006	2,100,000	April 4, 2011	
PlayStation	Home	Sony	November 15, 1995	1,000,000	April 1999	
Xbox 360	Home	Microsoft	March 2, 2006	700,000	June 2009	
Super Nintendo Entertainment System	Home	Nintendo	July 3, 1992	700,000	February 1997	
Master System	Home	Sega	1987	650,000	November 1994	
Nintendo 64	Home	Nintendo	March 1, 1997	500,000	January 1999	
Game Boy Color	Handheld	Nintendo	November 27, 1998	500,000	March 2000	
Game Boy	Handheld	Nintendo	1990	400,000+	March 2000	
Mega Drive	Home	Sega	1990	300,000	November 1994	
PlayStation 3	Home	Sony	March 3, 2007	285,000	June 2008	
GameCube	Home	Nintendo	September 14, 2001	167,899	Late 2007	
Game Gear	Handheld	Sega	1992	45,000	November 1994	
Mega-CD	Home	Sega	March 1993	20,000	November 1994	

=== New Zealand ===
Platform	Type	Company	Released	Units sold	Date of figure	Ref.
PlayStation 2	Home	Sony	November 30, 2000	525,000	December 2008	
PlayStation Portable	Handheld	Sony	September 1, 2005	142,000	December 2008	
PlayStation 3	Home	Sony	March 23, 2007	60,000	December 2008	

== Africa ==
=== South Africa ===
Platform	Type	Company	Released	Units sold	Date of figure	Ref.
PlayStation 3	Home	Sony	March 23, 2007	>300,000		
Wii	Home	Nintendo	November 2007	≈126,000	2009	

== "Other/Unknown" regions ==
Platform	Type	Company	Units sold	Date of figure	Ref.
Nintendo DS	Handheld	Nintendo	61,100,000	March 2016	
Game Boy Game Boy Color	Handheld	Nintendo	42,160,000	March 2003	
Wii	Home	Nintendo	40,230,000	March 2016	
Nintendo 3DS	Handheld	Nintendo	23,780,000	March 2020	
Game Boy Advance	Handheld	Nintendo	22,910,000	March 2010	
Nintendo Switch #	Hybrid	Nintendo	18,180,000	September 30, 2026	
Super Famicom Super Nintendo Entertainment System	Home	Nintendo	8,580,000	March 2001	
Family Computer Nintendo Entertainment System	Home	Nintendo	8,560,000	March 1995	
Nintendo 64	Home	Nintendo	6,750,000	March 2002	
GameCube	Home	Nintendo	4,770,000	March 2008	
Nintendo Switch 2 #	Hybrid	Nintendo	4,420,000	September 30, 2026	
Wii U	Home	Nintendo	3,740,000	December 31, 2016	
Mega Drive	Home	Sega	1,000,000	1994	
Philips CD-i	Home	Philips	45,000+	1994	
