= List of barcode games =

Barcode games are games that use barcodes, usually to enter characters and items for use in the game.

== Designated consoles ==
Numerous stand-alone card set games were released specifically for the following consoles.

- Barcode Battler
  - Barcode Battler
  - Barcode Battler II
- Barcode Eleven
- Barcode Printer
- Sega Barcode Arcade Machines
  - Dinosaur King
  - Love and Berry
  - LilPri
- Digimon Frontier (Japanese version)
- Skannerz'
  - Skannerz
  - Skannerz Commander
  - Skannerz Racerz
  - Saiyan Skannerz
    - Dragon Ball GT (Saiyan Skannerz)
  - Skannerz TV
  - Barbie Scanimals
- Super Barcode Wars
  - Super Barcode Wars
  - Super Barcode Wars: Dragon Ball Z
- Tiger Barcodzz
  - X-Men
  - Mighty Morphin Power Rangers
  - Mortal Kombat
  - Super Street Fighter II
  - The Adventures of Batman and Robin

== Interfaced games ==
Interface technology allowed the linking (usually via cables) of barcode-scanner hardware to other consoles. Games released for non-scanning consoles would employ the barcode scanner as a means to unlock secret content within the game or to add enhanced functionality. A number of games also relied on the barcode-scanning portion of the game in a manner which was integral to gameplay.

=== Famicom: Barcode World cable ===
- Barcode World

=== Famicom: Datach Joint ROM System ===
- Datach Battle Rush
- Datach Crayon Shin-Chan
- Datach J.League Super Top Players
- Datach SD Gundam World
- Datach Ultraman Club
- Datach YuuYuu Hakusho
- Dragon Ball Z: Gekitou Tenkaichi Budokai

=== Super Famicom: Barcode Battler II Interface ===
- Alice no Paint Adventure
- The Amazing Spider-Man: Lethal Foes
- Barcode Battler Senki: Super Senshi Shutsugeki Seyo!
- Donald Duck no Mahō no Bōshi
- Doraemon 2: Nobita no Toizurando Daibouken
- Doraemon 3: Nobita to Toki no Hougyoku
- Dragon Slayer: The Legend of Heroes II
- Hatayama Hatch no Pro Yakyuu News! Jitsumei Han
- J-League Excite Stage '94
- J-League Excite Stage '95
- Lupin III: Densetsu no Hihō wo Oe!

=== Game Boy: Barcode Boy ===
- Battle Space
- Monster Maker: Barcode Saga

=== Game Boy Color: Barcode Taisen Bardigun ===
- Barcode Taisen Bardigun

=== Game Boy Advance: Nintendo e-Reader ===
- Animal Crossing
- Domo-kun no Fushigi Terebi
- Mario VS Donkey Kong (Nintendo e-Reader)
- Pokémon Colosseum
- Pokémon Emerald
- Pokémon FireRed and LeafGreen
- Pokémon Ruby and Sapphire
- Rockman.EXE & Rockman Zero 3
- Super Mario Advance 4: Super Mario Bros. 3

=== PlayStation 3: PlayStation Eye ===
- The Eye of Judgment

=== PC ===
- Barcode Beasties
- Scan Command: Jurassic Park

== Smartphone games ==
=== Android ===
- Barcode RPG
- Barcode Beasties
- Barcode City
- Barcode Empire
- Barcode Rockstar
- Barcode Warrior
- Barcode Wars
- Codemon (Barcode Monsters)
- Barcode KANOJO
- Barcode Knight
- Warcodes

=== iOS ===
- Barcode Coliseum
- Barcode Hunt
- Barcode Wars
- Barcode Warz in Space
- Barcode Kingdom
- Barcode Knight
- Warcodes
