= Sylvanian Families (OVA series) =

Japanese OVA series

- DVD cover

シルバニアファミリー (Shirubania famirī)
- Genre: Slice of life
- Original video animation
- Directed by: Akira Takamura
- Produced by: Kōji Kawaguchi; Yumiko Muriai
- Written by: Hiroko Odaka
- Music by: Koichiro Kameyama
- Studio: Dyna Method
- Licensed by: UK: HIT Entertainment
- Released: June 20, 2007
- Runtime: 24 minutes
- Episodes: 3

Sylvanian Families (Japanese: シルバニアファミリー, Hepburn: Shirubania famirī) is a 2007 3DCG original video animation series produced by Dyna Method in cooperation with Itochu, Nippon Columbia and Shogakukan, based on the Sylvanian Families toy line by Epoch. It is the third adaptation of the Sylvanian Families characters to animation, preceded by the 1987 American animated series Sylvanian Families and the 1988 British stop motion animation Stories of the Sylvanian Families. It was produced by Kōji Kawaguchi and Yumiko Muriai, directed by Akira Takamura and the stories were written by Hiroko Odaka. The OVAs were released on June 20, 2007, on DVD with English-language subtitles. HIT Entertainment has licensed the series outside Japan.

== Characters ==
- The Periwinkles (Rabbits) - Alex, Kate, Oliver, Rebecca, Jamie
- The Walnuts (Squirrels) - Cedric, Yardley, Ralph, Saffron
- The Macavities (Cats) - Alonzo, Rumpus, Asparagus
- The Huckleberries (Dogs) - Hubert Alan, Dennis
- The Chocolates (Rabbits) - Frasier, Freya
- The Slydales (Foxes) - Slick, Buster, Scarlett
- The Cottontails (Rabbits) - Gromwell, Willow
- The Petites (Bears) - Piers
- The Keats (Cats) - Rosetti, Shelley

== Voice cast ==
- Tomoko Kawakami as Milk Usagi-chan / Rebecca Periwinkle
- Akiko Hasegawa as Kurumi Risu-chan / Saffron Walnut
- Kana Ueda as Shima Neko-chan / Asparagus Macavity
- Kōki Miyata as Maron Inu-kun / Dennis Huckleberry
- Fushigi Yamada as Kuma-kun / Piers Petite
- Chinami Nishimura as Kitsune-kun / Buster Slydale, Milk Usagi-kun / Oliver Periwinkle
- Kaori Mizuhashi as Kitsune-chan / Scarlett Slydale
- Maya Okamoto as Chocolate Usagi-chan / Freya Chocolate, Kurumi Risu Okasan / Yardley Walnut
- Yukiko Mizuochi as Milk Usagi Okasan / Kate Periwinkle
- Aso Tomohisa as Cream Neko Otosan / Rossetti Keats
- Jun'ichi Sugawara as Kitsune Otosan / Dr. Slick Slydale
- Toshitsugu Takashina as Milk Usagi Otosan / Alex Periwinkle
- Megumi Matsumoto as Kurumi Risu-kun / Ralph Walnut
- Makiko Ohmoto as Shima Neko-kun / Rumpus Macavity
- Hyo-sei as Wata Usagi-kun / Gromwell Cottontail
- Ai Maeda as Cream Neko-chan / Shelley Keats
- Kiyoyuki Yanada as Maron Inu Sensei / Headmaster Hubert Alan Huckleberry
- Koichi Yamadera as Kurumi Risu Otosan / Cedric Walnut

== Episodes ==
No.	Title	Original release date
1	"Magic Tricks" / "Heart Pounding Mischief Magic" "Dokidoki itazura majikku" (ドキドキいたずらマジック)	June 20, 2007
Buster Slydale has gone too far with his pranks that his friends Rebecca, Saffron, Dennis, Asparagus and Piers decide to get even with him. They trick Buster into thinking he is invisible. At first the plan seems to backfire, but then Buster does nice things for them. After testing Buster with one more trick, everyone makes up.
2	"Dreaming of Princess" / "The Longingly Princess" "Princess ni Akogarete" (プリンセスにあこがれて)	June 20, 2007
Saffron gets fed up of her father Cedric's inventions. Her friends Shelley and Rebecca encourage her to audition for the school's annual play as a princess. When Saffron gets the part, she gets nervous of stage fright. Cedric and all Saffron's friends help prepare her for the performance. During the dress rehearsal, the stage is destroyed and Saffron breaks her leg. Doctor Slick and Cedric save the performance from going to ruin.
3	"Legend of the Comet" / "The Gift of the Shooting Star" "Nagareboshi no okurimono" (流れ星のおくりもの)	June 20, 2007
There is great talk of a comet passing through Acorn Mountain witnessed by many Sylvanians last night. Rumpus believes it is the legendary Silvery Comet, which can grant wishes. Rumpus goes on an expedition with his friends including a skeptical Gromwell. Inside caves, they run into danger, but the fragments of the Silvery Comet they found magically bring them back to safety.

== Music ==
Koichiro Kameyama, of Project.R fame, was composer of the score for the OVA series.

The OVA's opening song is titled Sylvanian Families (シルバニアファミリー, Shirubania famirī), performed by Hitomi Yoshida and the ending theme is titled Become Tomorrow♪ (明日になぁれ♪, Ashita ni nāre♪) by Tomoko Kawakami, Akiko Hasegawa, Kōki Miyata, Fushigi Yamada, Kaori Mizuhashi and Maya Okamoto.
