= Stories of the Sylvanian Families =

- Genre: Children's television
- Based on: Sylvanian Families by Epoch
- Written by: Pat Posner
- Directed by: Jo Pullen; Martin Pullen
- Narrated by: Bernard Cribbins
- Composer: Herbert Chappell
- Country of origin: United Kingdom
- Original language: English
- No. of episodes: 4

Production
- Executive producer: Graham Clutterbuck
- Producer: Barrie Edwards
- Editor: Rob Dunbar
- Running time: 10 minutes
- Production company: FilmFair

Original release
- Release: 25 May 1988

Related
- Sylvanian Families (1987); Sylvanian Families (2007)

Stories of the Sylvanian Families is a British children's television miniseries produced by FilmFair for Tomy UK and Epoch Co., and directed by Jo and Martin Pullen. It is the second animated series based on the Sylvanian Families media franchise, and the only one animated in stop motion. The series was released direct-to-video through The Video Collection in May 1988, and features four episodes, each narrated by Bernard Cribbins.

== Overview ==
In contrast to the 1987 animated series, Stories of the Sylvanian Families is a pure slice-of-life series that focuses on a different set of characters and does not feature humans or villains. Each of the four episodes focuses on a different character and the problems they may face.

== Characters ==
- The Babblebrooks (grey rabbits): Grandfather Cliff, Grandmother Pearl, Father Rocky, Mother Crystal, Brother Bubba, Sister Breezy, Baby Sandy and Baby Coral
- The Evergreens (grey bears): Grandfather Ernest, Grandmother Primrose, Father Forrest, Mother Honeysuckle, Older Brother Logan, Older Sister Summer, Brother Preston, Sister Ashley, Baby Dusty and Baby Poppy
- The McBurrows (moles): Father Digger, Mother Heidi, Brother Muddy, Sister Molly, Baby Monty and Baby Mo
- The Oakwoods (squirrels): Father Ollie, Mother Betsy, Brother Barnaby, Sister Bluebell, Baby Abbie and Baby Acorn
- The Slydales (foxes): Father Slick, Mother Velvette, Brother Buster, Sister Scarlett, Baby Skitter and Baby Lindy
- The Thistlethorns (mice): Father Chester, Mother Willow, Brother Lester, Sister Prissy, Baby Barry and Baby Heather
- The Timbertops (brown bears): Grandfather Gus, Grandmother Fern, Father Taylor, Mother Rose, Older Brother Birch, Older Sister Ivy, Brother Bud, Sister Daisy, Baby Burl and Baby Blossom
- The Treefellows (owls): Father Aristotle, Mother Arabella, Baby Winky, Baby Blinky and Baby Grumpy
- The Waters (beavers): Father Wade, Mother Nancy, Brother Roger, Sister Misty, Baby Bucky and Baby Bubbles
- The Wildwoods (brown rabbits): Grandfather Smokey, Grandmother Flora, Father Herb, Mother Ginger, Brother Rusty, Sister Hollie, Baby Barkley and Baby Juniper

== Episodes ==
No.	Title	Air date
1	"Lucky Mascot"	25 May 1988
While exploring, Birch Timbertop finds a lost goat and takes it to school, but then has to take her back to the valley.
2	"Camping Holiday"	25 May 1988
In preparation for a storytime party with the Evergreens, Grandfather Ernest builds playpens, which end up as tents for a Camping Holiday.
3	"Fun at the Fair"	25 May 1988
In the Sylvanian fair, Buster Slydale plays a trick on his sister Scarlett. Scarlett and her friends decide to trick Buster back.
4	"Lucky Clover"	25 May 1988
Misty Water wants to miss out on Rusty's band due to her lack of musical talent, but finds a four-leafed clover, which makes her try out for the band.
