= Sylvanian Families (1987 TV series) =

- DVD cover
- Genre: Animated series
- Created by: Phil Harnage
- Based on: Sylvanian Families/Calico Critters by Epoch
- Developed by: Phil Harnage
- Directed by: Christian Choquet
- Voices of: Frank Proctor; Len Carlson; John Stocker; Brian Belfry; Noam Zylberman
- Composers: Haim Saban; Shuki Levy
- Country of origin: United States
- No. of episodes: 13 (26 segments)

Production
- Executive producer: Andy Heyward
- Producer: Tetsuo Katayama
- Running time: 30 minutes
- Production company: DIC Animation City (Note: Animation outsourced to KK C&D Asia, Tokyo Movie Shinsha, Sei Young Animation and Mook Animation.)

Original release
- Network: First-run syndication
- Release: September 18 – December 11, 1987

Related
- Stories of the Sylvanian Families (1988); Sylvanian Families (2007)

Sylvanian Families is an American syndicated animated series based on the Sylvanian Families merchandising franchise developed by Epoch. The series was produced in the United States by DIC Animation City with the animation being produced in Japan. The series was syndicated by Coca-Cola Telecommunications in the Fall of 1987, with reruns on The CBN Family Channel in the late 1980s and PAX TV during the late 1990s.

== Premise ==
In a land called Sylvania, anthropomorphic animals called Sylvanians live and do normal lives. In each episode, a human child wishes that he or she could visit Sylvania when they have problems.

== Voice cast ==
- Frank Proctor as Woodkeeper
- Len Carlson as Packbat / Wade Waters / Cliff Babblebrook / Rocky Babblebrook
- John Stocker as Gatorpossum / Grandpa Smoky Wildwood / Gruff Timpertop / Taylor Timbertop / Chester Thistlethorn
- Michael Fantini as Preston Evergreen
- Jeri Craden as Mama Honeysuckle Evergreen
- Thick Wilson as Grandpa Ernest Evergreen
- Ellen-Ray Hennessy as Grandma Primrose Evergreen
- Noam Zylberman as Rusty Wildwood
- Catherine Gallant as Hollie Wildwood
- Jeremiah McCann as Buster Slydale
- Lisa Coristine as Scarlette Slydale
- Brian Belfry as Papa Slick Slydale
- Diane Fabian as Mama Velvette Slydale / Grandma Flora Wildwood / Mama Ginger Wildwood
- Tabitha St. Germain (credited as Paulina Gillis) as Ashley Evergreen, Penny
- Chuck Shamata as Forrest Evergreen
- Tara Strong (uncredited) as Bridget (her debut role)
- Cree Summer (uncredited) as Donny, Jessica
- Kerry Shale (uncredited) as Papa Herb Wildwood
- Marla Lukofsky (uncredited) as Jerry, Tracy, Prissy Thistlethorn, Willow

== Characters ==
Heroes

- The Evergreens (Bears) - Forrest, Honeysuckle, Ernest, Primrose, Preston, Ashley, Dusty and Poppy
- The Babblebrooks (Rabbits) - Rocky, Crystal, Cliff, Pearl, Bubba, Breezy, Sandy and Coral
- The Thistlethorns (Mice) - Chester, Willow, Lester, Prissy, Barry and Heather
- The Chestnuts (Raccoons) - Durwood, Pansy, Grover, Myrtle, Hoss and Charity
- The Wildwoods (Rabbits) - Herb, Ginger, Smokey, Flora, Rusty, Hollie, Barkley and Juniper
- The Slydales (Foxes) - Slick, Velvette, Buster, Scarlett, Skitter and Lindy
- The Timbertops (Bears) - Taylor, Rose, Gruff, Fern, Bud, Daisy, Burl and Blossom
- The Waters (Beavers) - Wade, Nancy, Roger, Misty, Bucky and Bubbles
- The Windwards (Rabbits) Hickory and Lily
- The Sweetwaters (Bears) Morris and Kelsey

Villains

- Packbat
- Gatorpossum (Packbat's minion)
- The Slydales

Human

- The Woodkeeper

Children

Donny, Joey, Grace, Maria, Charlie, Penny, Jack, Jonathan, Katie, Bridget, Jessica, Lisa, Chrissie, Robby, Sara, Sid, Jamie, Tracy, Diane (Di), Jerry & Susan, Mikey, Lori, Andy, Deborah, Evan, Amelia.

== Episodes ==
No.	Title	Written by	Original release date
1	"Dam Busters"	Phil Harnage	September 18, 1987
1	"Outfoxing the Foxes"	Jack Hanrahan and Eleanor Burian-Mohr	September 18, 1987
Dam Busters: Seven-year-old Donny wishes that he was strong, just like his big brother. In Sylvania, he assists Preston and Grandpa Ernest with their new invention. Meanwhile, Packbat sends Gatorpossum to destroy a dam to flood the forest.; Outfoxing the Foxes: Six-year-old Joey wishes he was wise to other people's tricks. In Sylvania, he helps the Wildwoods with their carrot picking, but Buster and Scarlett keep snatching them. Joey comes up with a plan to save the carrot vault from Packbat's plunder.
2	"Grace Under Pressure"	Phil Harnage	September 25, 1987
2	"Fraidy Cats"	Jim Lenahan	September 25, 1987
Grace Under Pressure: Seven-year-old Grace wishes she was less clumsy. In Sylvania, she assists Myrtle and Ashley with both babysitting and mail delivery, while Packbat awaits to hinder their process.; Fraidy Cats: Six-year-old Maria wishes she were not afraid of the dark. In Sylvania, she helps Daisy and Holly prepare for a party, but Gatorpossum captures them. Maria releases them and they all manage to thwart Packbat's plan to spoil the party.
3	"The Bear Facts"	Martha Moran	October 2, 1987
3	"Fool's Gold"	Cherie Wilkerson	October 2, 1987
The Bear Facts: Seven-year-old Charlie is an amateur detective who wishes that he had something to investigate. In Sylvania, he helps solve the mystery behind an acorn theft that Mayor Gruff is accused of.; Fool’s Gold: Seven-year-old Penny wishes that she had treasure to give to her family. In Sylvania, she goes on a scavenger hunt with Rusty and Grover in Packbat's house that ends with Grover being kidnapped. Penny helps find a treasure to give Packbat in exchange for Grover's release.
4	"Know It All"	Steve Robertson and John Vornholt	October 9, 1987
4	"School Daze"	John Howard	October 9, 1987
Know It All: Nine-year-old Jack wishes people would stop telling him off. In Sylvania, he helps Bud to thwart the Slydales' beehive theft, but Jack is pretty hasty. With some advice from Mrs. Timbertop, Jack and Bud put an end to the theft once and for all.; School Daze: Six-year-old Jonathan wishes never to go to school again. In Sylvania, he plays hookey with Rusty and Lester. Packbat gets Buster to help destroy the school, but Mr. Thistlethorn thwarts the attempt.
5	"Double Trouble"	Martha Moran	October 16, 1987
5	"Cooking Up Trouble"	Eleanor Burian-Mohr and Jack Hanrahan	October 16, 1987
Double Trouble: Seven-year-old Katie wishes she was happy again. In Sylvania, she assists Ashley and Breezy with babysitting, but later, Packbat kidnaps the lot of them. They all break loose and lead Packbat into a trap.; Cooking Up Trouble: Seven-year-old Bridget wishes she could eat much sweet food. In Sylvania, she assists Hollie and Rusty with Grandma Pearl's bad cooking, which Gatorpossum substitutes for himself trying to spoil the Ginger Festival.
6	"Daddy's Little Girl"	Phil Harnage	October 23, 1987
6	"Beauty and the Beast"	Phil Harnage	October 23, 1987
Daddy's Little Girl: Six-year-old Jessica thinks that her father doesn't love her anymore after her parents' divorce. In Sylvania, she runs across the forest with Ashley’s father to cure Ashley and Skitter after they eat poisonous toadstools. When she attends Ashley's family picnic afterwards, Jessica learns that people can love each other even when they are apart.; Beauty and the Beast: Eight-year-old Lisa wishes she was beautiful. In Sylvania, she goes with Rusty to a beauty contest, but Packbat captures her along with Rusty and Scarlett. After their escape, Lisa wins the beauty contest.
7	"The Wheel Thing"	Jean Ann Wright	October 30, 1987
7	"Muddy Waters"	Steve Robertson and John Vornholt	October 30, 1987
The Wheel Thing: Seven-year-old wheelchair-using Chrissie loves reading stories to her brother, but wishes she could go on her own adventure. In Sylvania, Packbat is plotting to sneak through the golden door by disguising himself as Chrissie and stealing her wheelchair.; Muddy Waters: Eight-year-old Robby never wants to bathe again. In Sylvania, he helps Rusty stop the Slydales from contaminating the water with skunk cabbages.
8	"There's No Place Like Home"	David Ehrman	November 6, 1987
8	"Tough Enough"	Antonio G. Ortiz and Carmella Ortiz	November 6, 1987
There's No Place Like Home: Seven-year-old Sara wishes that her mother could stay home more often instead of working so much. In Sylvania, she goes camping with Ashley and Breezy and all of them get lost. When Ashley and Breezy's mothers rescue them, Jessica realizes how much working mothers can love their children.; Tough Enough: Seven-year-old Sid thinks it is fun to pick on his little brother when he was sent to bed very early. In Sylvania, he learns a lesson in humility when he teams up with Buster and Packbat to dig a trench at the river.
9	"Hip to Be Bear"	Eleanor Burian-Mohr and Jack Hanrahan	November 13, 1987
9	"Feud for Thought"	Martha Moran	November 13, 1987
Hip to Be Bear: Six-year-old Jamie wishes his grandparents were "cooler". In Sylvania, he helps the Evergreens rescue Dusty and Poppy from Gatorpossum.; Feud for Thought: Seven-year-old Tracy wishes she had a perfect family. In Sylvania, she helps Rusty Wildwood with his grandparents' anniversary party, but it doesn't go as planned.
10	"Stand by Your Dad"	Temple Mathews	November 20, 1987
10	"My Brother's Keeper"	Lisa Maliani	November 20, 1987
Stand By Your Dad: Seven-year-old Diane (Di for short) wishes that her father was not a garbageman. In Sylvania, she helps Preston save the recycling center from being destroyed by Packbat and Gatorpossum.; My Brother’s Keeper: Seven-year-old twins Susan and Jerry are constantly fighting. In Sylvania, they learn to put aside their differences and stop an avalanche created by Packbat.
11	"Boy's Intuition"	Brynne Stephens	November 27, 1987
11	"Here Come the Brides"	Eleanor Burian-Mohr and Jack Hanrahan	November 27, 1987
Boy's Intuition: Eight-year-old Mikey wishes that other boys would stop calling him a sissy because he likes to babysit and play with dolls. In Sylvania, he helps prevent Buster's younger siblings, Lindy and Skitter, from being kidnapped by Packbat and Gatorpossum.; Here Come the Brides: Seven-year-old Lori worries about her mother remarrying. In Sylvania, she helps the families organise a double wedding, which Packbat is plotting to stop.
12	"Founders Keepers"	Phil Harnage	December 4, 1987
12	"Little Ms. Woodkeeper"	Phil Harnage	December 4, 1987
Founders Keepers: Eight-year-old Andy wishes that someone would tell him a good bedtime story. In Sylvania, he goes to the Founders' Day campout and hears a story about the first settlers of the Sylvanian Forest.; Little Ms. Woodkeeper: Eight-year-old Deborah wishes that she could be the next Woodkeeper and do something exciting. In Sylvania, she helps destroy a makeshift dam that Packbat has built at the top of a waterfall.
13	"Hoppily Ever After"	Eleanor Burian-Mohr and Jack Hanrahan	December 11, 1987
13	"Really Amelia"	Steve Robertson and John Vornholt	December 11, 1987
Hoppily Ever After: Eight-year-old Evan is an only child, whose father is fixing to marry a woman who has two children of her own. In Sylvania, he helps the families after Packbat and Gatorpossum steal their wedding feast.; Really Amelia: Seven-year-old Amelia wishes that she was a hero, like her namesake Amelia Earhart. In Sylvania, she helps Preston save the crops by piloting his plane and using it to scare away Packbat.

== Home media ==
Golden Book Video, in association with DIC Video, released three VHS tapes of the series in the United States in 1988. Two of the tapes contained three segments, while the other one contained five.

In the United Kingdom, MSD Video and Abbey Home Entertainment released many tapes of the series throughout the 1980s and 1990s. One of these tapes was Sylvanian Families: The Movie, which, despite its name, featured several segments edited together to form a film.

In February 2004, Sterling Entertainment Group released two VHS tapes and DVDs, titled The Big Adventure and Hoppily Ever After, each containing three episodes (six segments). An extra segment was included on the DVD versions. The first segment from episode three: "The Bear Facts" was also included on the Care Bears: To The Rescue DVD from the same company a year prior. The Big Adventure was reissued by NCircle Entertainment in 2008.

In May 2004, Maximum Entertainment in the United Kingdom released a DVD that contained the first five episodes of the series. This DVD was reissued in 2007, and again in 2009 by Lace DVD.

In 2010, Magna Home Entertainment in Australia released a two-disc set containing all 13 episodes of the series.
