= Skannerz =

Electronic toy line

Skannerz is a series of electronic toys made by Radica Games that use barcode technology to create an interactive battle game. Radica brand barcodes have the additional feature of being able to act as a healing code in the first two iterations of the game.

== Models ==
=== Skannerz ===
The original Skannerz came in three versions which represented the three tribes:

- Zendra (blue)
- Pataak (green)
- Ujalu (red)

If a player scans a barcode containing a rival tribe's monster, a battle would be initiated. Also, items could be gathered from Universal Product Code barcodes. Another feature is the two player battle system where two versions could be linked together and battle. There are 126 monsters to collect and control between the 3 controllers. Additionally, the monsters also each possessed a special 'type' or 'class' - these types are:

- Magic
- Tech
- Power

Released in 2000.

=== Skannerz Commander ===
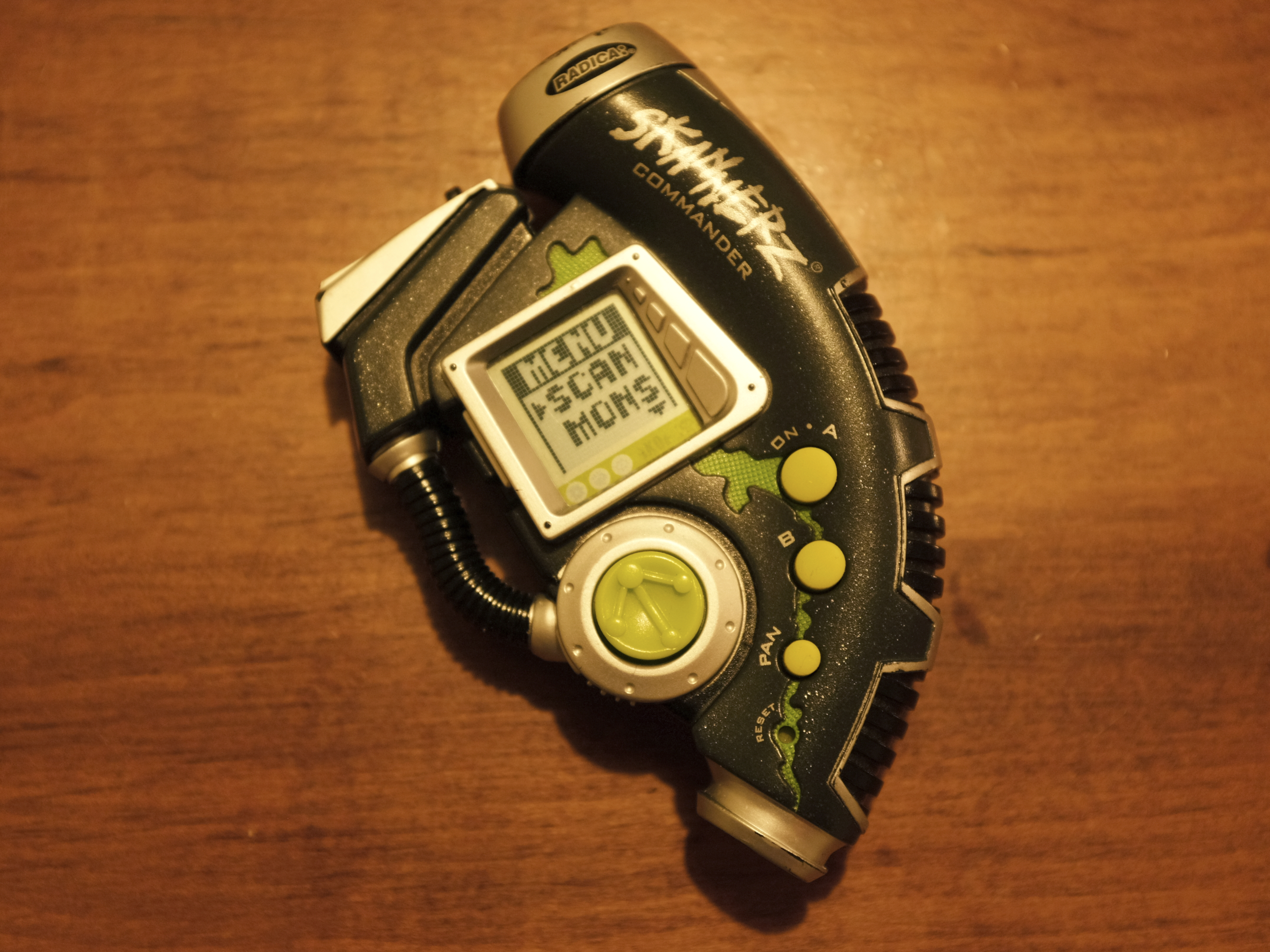
Skannerz Commander handheld

The Skannerz Commander is second in the series. There are no "tribes" in this version nor are there different models. With this model the user that scans can get the opponent's monster by winning, but this means that therefore they will lose a monster with a loss. The Skannerz Commander game is incompatible with the original Skannerz models. It was released in 2001.

=== Skannerz Racerz ===
The Skannerz Racerz is the third in the Skannerz series, where the players can scan barcodes, and race cars from three classes: "Off-Road", "Drag", and "Street". There are 120 cars in total, which consists of 40 cars per class. The game also has 64 optional parts that can be installed onto any of player's vehicles to upgrade them. The players start the game with a basic vehicle known as the "Gizmo" and they must win a certain number of races to progress in rank, from Rookie to Amateur to Pro. Cars and parts can be obtained by scanning barcodes and either receiving a car from the dealership or beating your opponent in a Pink Slip style race. Parts are also obtained the same way as dealership cars, but are received from the Garage. Only one of each car and car part can be obtained. Hindrances can pop up anytime the players scan a barcode in the form of losing car to the police, being impounded or a modified car crashing into a tree and losing a part. Races involve beating the other opponent and also involve 5 Speed Gear changes. Each track has its own obstacles: off-road has bumps that the players have to avoid, drag involves car swaying from side to side along the track and street involves car slowing and sliding around turns.

=== Skannerz Orbz ===
The fourth Skannerz series did not involve barcode scanning. The Skannerz Orbz are balls that act as arenas for other monsters. Not all previous monsters are included but the selected were put into disks ("dizks") which plug into the orb. The orb has two halves:

- the bottom half is the storage compartment for the dizks
- the top half is where the dizks are inserted and battled

The orbz have a larger focus on strategy, the player must choose the monsters and strategy before the battle starts; once the battle commences, the player has no control over the battle except to cheer the team on. The top half of the orb can be connected to the top half of a separate player. This battle is set up the same but at the end of a player battle the winner is given special items.

== Monsters ==
There are 126 monsters to collect divided evenly between the first three consoles and 12 secret monsters (commonly known as the "Exiles") that any console can get. The Skannerz Commander console has another 126 monsters and 12 secret monsters that are unobtainable on the other models.

Monsters can be obtained through scanning a product barcode, and made to fight other monsters through a battle with another controller, or a battle with a NPC when a barcode belonging to another console is scanned.

Each monster has up to three attacks that can be learned when it gains enough HP. Generally, each attack is more powerful than the last, and the player may choose which one to use to fight.

== See also ==
- Barcode Battler
- List of barcode games
