= Barcode Battler =

Handheld game console by Epoch Co.

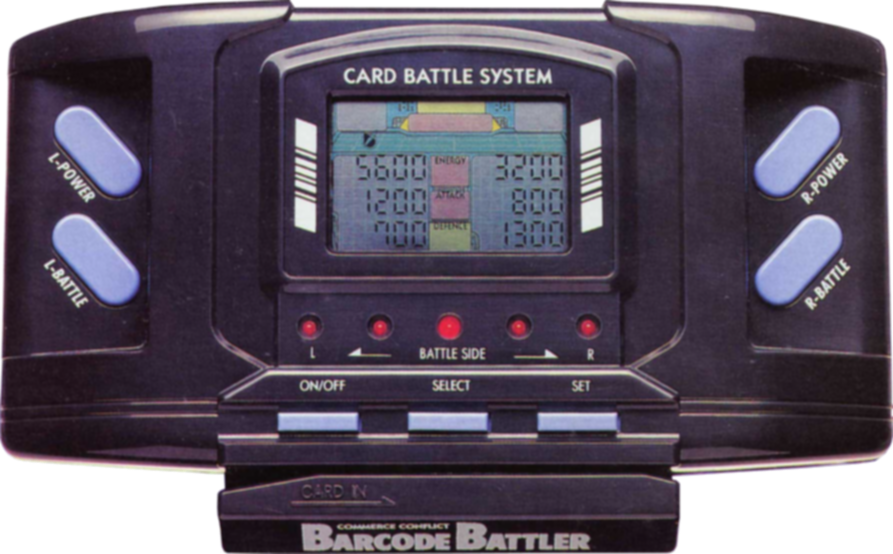
- Manufacturer: Epoch Co.
- Type: Handheld LCD game
- Generation: Second
- Lifespan: 1991–1995
- Media: N/A

The Barcode Battler (Note: Japanese: バーコードバトラー, Hepburn: Bākōdo Batorā) is a handheld electronic game released by Epoch Co. in March 1991.

The console comes with a number of cards, each of which has a barcode. Upon starting the game, the player must swipe a barcode representing a player. The game uses barcodes to create a character for the player to use. Not all barcodes work as players; instead some represent enemies or powerups. Because of the ubiquity of barcodes in daily life, players are encouraged to go beyond the barcodes provided with the game itself and to experiment to find their own barcode monsters and powerups from everyday products like food and cleaning products.

Once the game itself is started, the characters "battle" against each other. The characters' statistics are applied to an algorithm containing a random number generator to determine the outcome of each round in the fight.

== Popularity ==
The Barcode Battler was very popular in Japan—the idea of experimenting with and collecting barcodes to find out what they would equate to in the gaming world fired the imaginations of many people.

Outside Japan, it was a massive flop; it was hyped up, and sold in shops alongside the Game Boy, and the Game Gear, to which it bore some superficial similarities. By comparison, the gameplay of the Barcode Battler was repetitive and featured no graphics, sound effects or controls, and was quickly forgotten by the general gaming public.

In Japan, licensed cards featuring characters from other franchises were released. Nintendo-licensed special edition cards were produced for both the Mario and The Legend of Zelda series. Other special edition versions were commissioned by Falcom (for Lord Monarch/Dragon Slayer) and NTV (for the Doraemon series).

Irish Supermarkets Quinnsworth and Crazy Prices gave away 10,000 Barcode Battler consoles in a promotion in 1993.

== Barcode Battler II ==
The popularity of the Barcode Battler was such that in 1992, a follow-up handheld called the Barcode Battler II (Note: Japanese: バーコードバトラーII) was designed to provide enhanced functionality.

It featured an extended single player mode, a wider variety of game elements, and an output port designed with interface capabilities - a feature that Nintendo took advantage of in licensing the Barcode Battler II Interface unit. The BBII Interface allowed the Barcode Battler to be attached to the Famicom and Super Famicom (via an adapter) consoles similar to the way the GameCube – Game Boy Advance link cable allows for interfacing of the GameCube with the e-Reader. The functionality of the Barcode Battler II while on this connection was purely as a barcode reader and the gameplay depended on the game cartridge in the machine it was connected to.

Some time in 1992/1993, Epoch released the Barcode Battler II across the world, under the name of Barcode Battler. Essentially, the worldwide release differed from the Japanese model in only the design of the LCD screen — it had an English interface instead of a Japanese one. It still had the output port, but no games support it outside of Japanese releases. Also, the artwork on the manuals and barcode cards differed to suit the Western gaming audience.

In 2025, over 30 years since the original release, UK based video game developer Tanukii Studios published a brand Barcode Battler card set Riot Gunheads - Hyper World Injustice Fighters consisting of 36 cards that were fully compatible with the Barcode Battler II device.

=== Interfaced games ===
Due to the professional relationship between Epoch Co. and Nintendo, Epoch designed a number of games for the Famicom and Super Famicom that require the use of the Barcode Battler II and BBII Interface to play or to enjoy enhanced functions. These games include:

- Barcode World (Note: バーコードワールド) (Famicom, 1992)
- Barcode Battler Senki: Super Senshi Shutsugeki Seyo! (Note: バーコードバトラー戦記 スーパー戦士出撃せよ!) (Super Famicom, 1993)
- Dragon Slayer II (Note: ドラゴンスレイヤーII) (Super Famicom, 1993)
- Hatayama Hatch no Pro Yakyuu News! Jitsumei Han (Note: はた山ハッチのパロ野球ニュース！実名版) (Super Famicom, 1993)
- Doraemon 2: Nobita's Great Adventure Toys Land (Note: ドラえもん2 のび太のトイズランド大冒険) (Super Famicom, 1993)
- J-League '94 (Note: Jリーグ94) (Super Famicom, 1994)
- Doraemon 3: Nobita and the Jewel of Time (Note: ドラえもん3 のび太と時の宝玉) (Super Famicom, 1994)
- Lupin III: Densetsu no Hihō wo Oe! (Note: ルパン三世 伝説の秘宝を追え!) (Super Famicom, 1994)
- The Amazing Spider-Man: Lethal Foes (Note: スパイダーマン リーサルフォーズ) (Super Famicom, 1995)
- J-League '95 (Note: Jリーグ95) (Super Famicom, 1995)
- Donald Duck no Mahō no Bōshi (Note: ドナルドダックの魔法のぼうし) (Super Famicom, 1995)
- Alice no Paint Adventure (Note: アリスのペイントアドベンチャー) (Super Famicom, 1995)

== Manga ==
A manga was produced to promote the Barcode Battler, called "Barcode Fighter". Five volumes were produced between April 1992 and June 1994, and were later reprinted into two volumes.

== See also ==
- List of barcode games
- Epoch Game Pocket Computer
- Nintendo e-Reader
- Digimon Frontier
- Skannerz
- Monster Rancher § Monster generation
