= Cassette Vision =

Home video game console

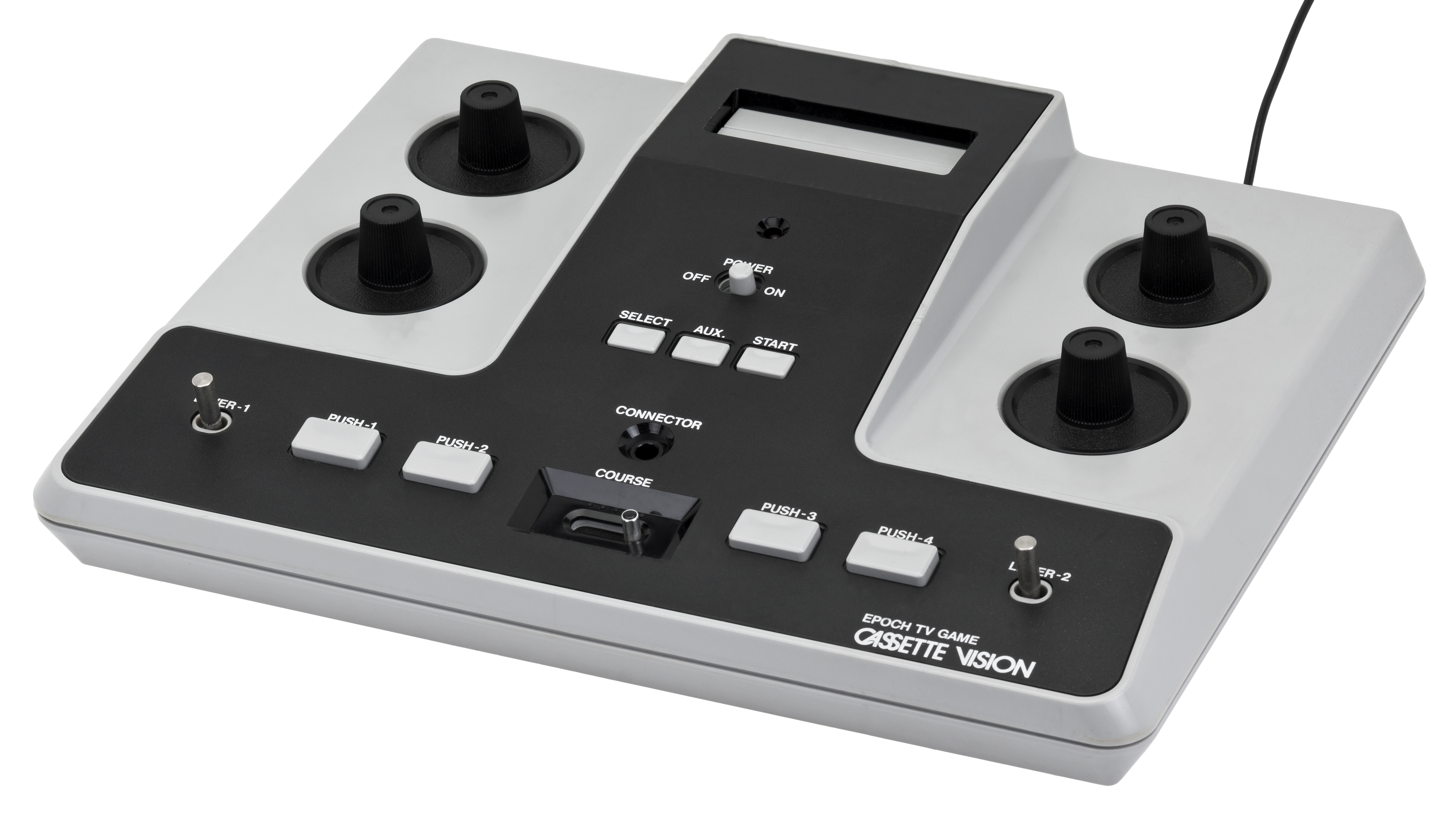
- Manufacturer: Epoch
- Type: Home video game console
- Generation: Second generation
- Released: JP: July 30, 1981
- Introductory price: ¥13,500 ($61)
- Discontinued: August 1984
- Units sold: c. 400,000
- CPU: NEC μPD777C or μPD778
- Removable storage: ROM cartridge
- Display: 75 x 60; 8 colors
- Graphics: μPD777C or μPD778
- Sound: Beeper
- Input: Internal controllers
- Predecessor: TV Vader
- Successor: Super Cassette Vision

The Cassette Vision (Note: Japanese: カセットビジョン, Hepburn: Kasetto Bijon) is a second generation home video game console made by Epoch Co. and released in Japan on July 30, 1981. A redesigned model called the Cassette Vision Jr. was released afterwards.

The term cassette is a contemporary Japanese synonym for ROM cartridge, not to be confused with the magnetic cassette tape format. In terms of power, it is comparable to the Atari 2600. The Cassette Vision has unusual controls: four knobs built into the console itself, two for each player (one for horizontal, one for vertical), plus two buttons per player.

The system originally retailed for ¥13,500, with games priced at ¥4,000. The Cassette Vision sold around 400,000 units, and was the best selling video game console in Japan before Nintendo's Family Computer. It received a successor called the Super Cassette Vision.

== History ==
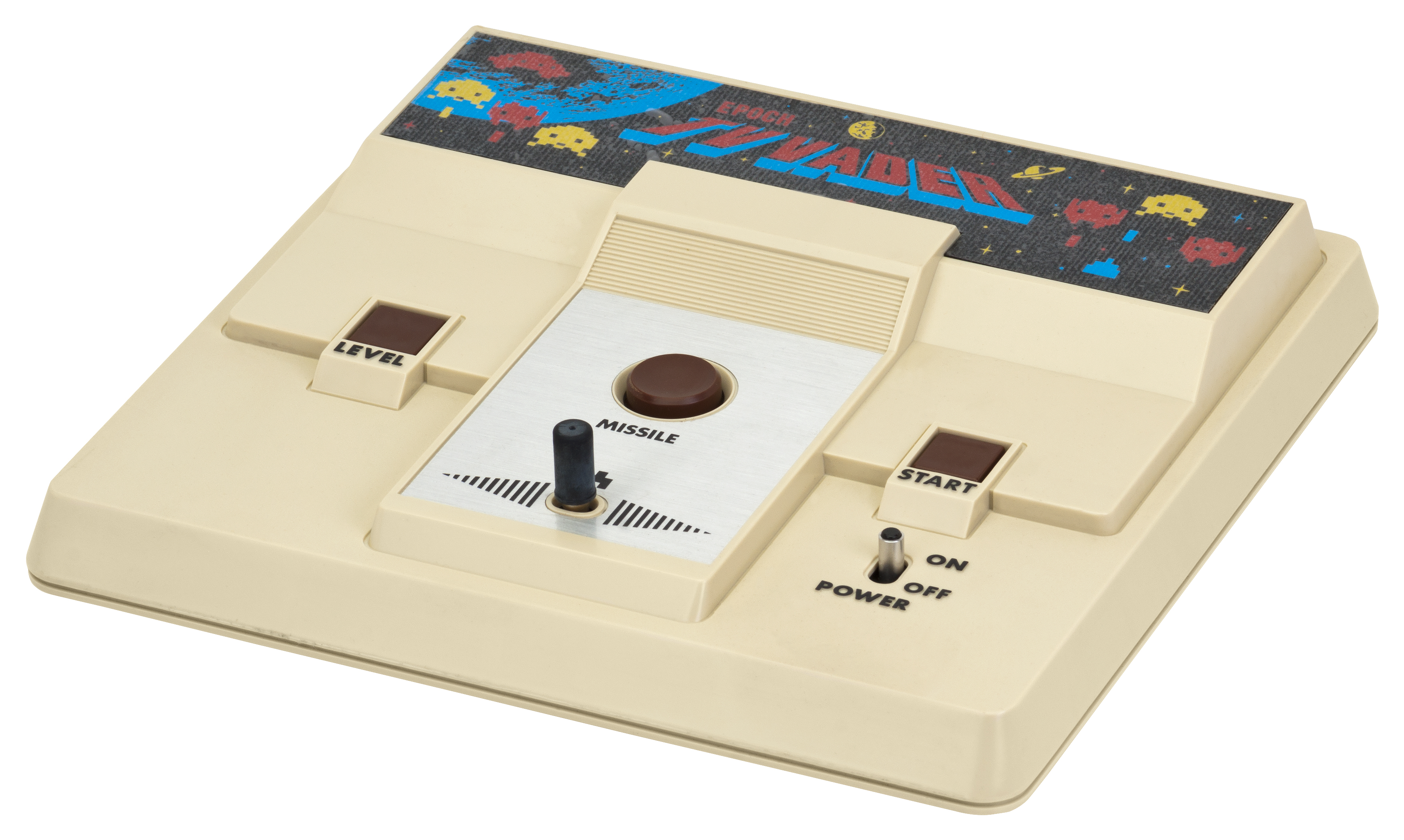
The Cassette Vision was inspired by Epoch's previous video game console efforts, such as TV Vader.

Founded in 1958 by Maeda Taketora, Epoch was originally a manufacturer of plastic baseball boards, before transitioning to designing toys, board games, and playing cards. Epoch rose to become one of Japan's largest toy companies during the 1960s and 1970s, in part due to its family-run business model. The company released the TV Tennis Electrotennis in 1975, the first video game console released in Japan. In 1980, it released the TV Vader, a dedicated home console that featured a clone of Space Invaders, which was moderately successful. Based on its experience with designing handheld electronic games and other kinds of video game hardware, Epoch began work on creating a video game console that utilized interchangeable ROM cartridges to play software.

Epoch supervisor and designer Masayuki Horie was assigned as the designer and hardware engineer of the Cassette Vision. Horie previously worked on the Digit-Com 9, a baseball LSI, and several of the company's earlier dedicated consoles. The console was to represent "the perfection or maturation" of Epoch's previous console efforts, most notably the TV Baseball from 1979. Epoch wanted the Cassette Vision to be based around cartridges to help clear out space in one's house, as its dedicated machines were usually big and took up room. The Cassette Vision was not the first cartridge-based console released in Japan; earlier examples include the Video Cassette Rock by Takatoku Toys and the TV Jack 5000 by Bandai. Because of the way Epoch designed its previous consoles, the development team working under Horie was unable to separate the ROM and CPU in the console.

The Cassette Vision was released in Japan on July 30, 1981, at a retail price of ¥13,500. Epoch based its marketing strategy on what worked for Atari and its Video Computer System in 1977, which Epoch had released in Japan as the Cassette TV Game in 1979. The console's name comes from the Japanese synonym for ROM cartridge. As the country's home console market possessed few "major" competitors, the Cassette Vision quickly rose in popularity and sales, becoming the best-selling game console in Japan at the time. It claimed 70% of the market by 1982, surpassing the Cassette TV Game and Bandai's import of the Intellivision. Horie believes part of the console's success lay in its accessibility and appeal towards consumers.

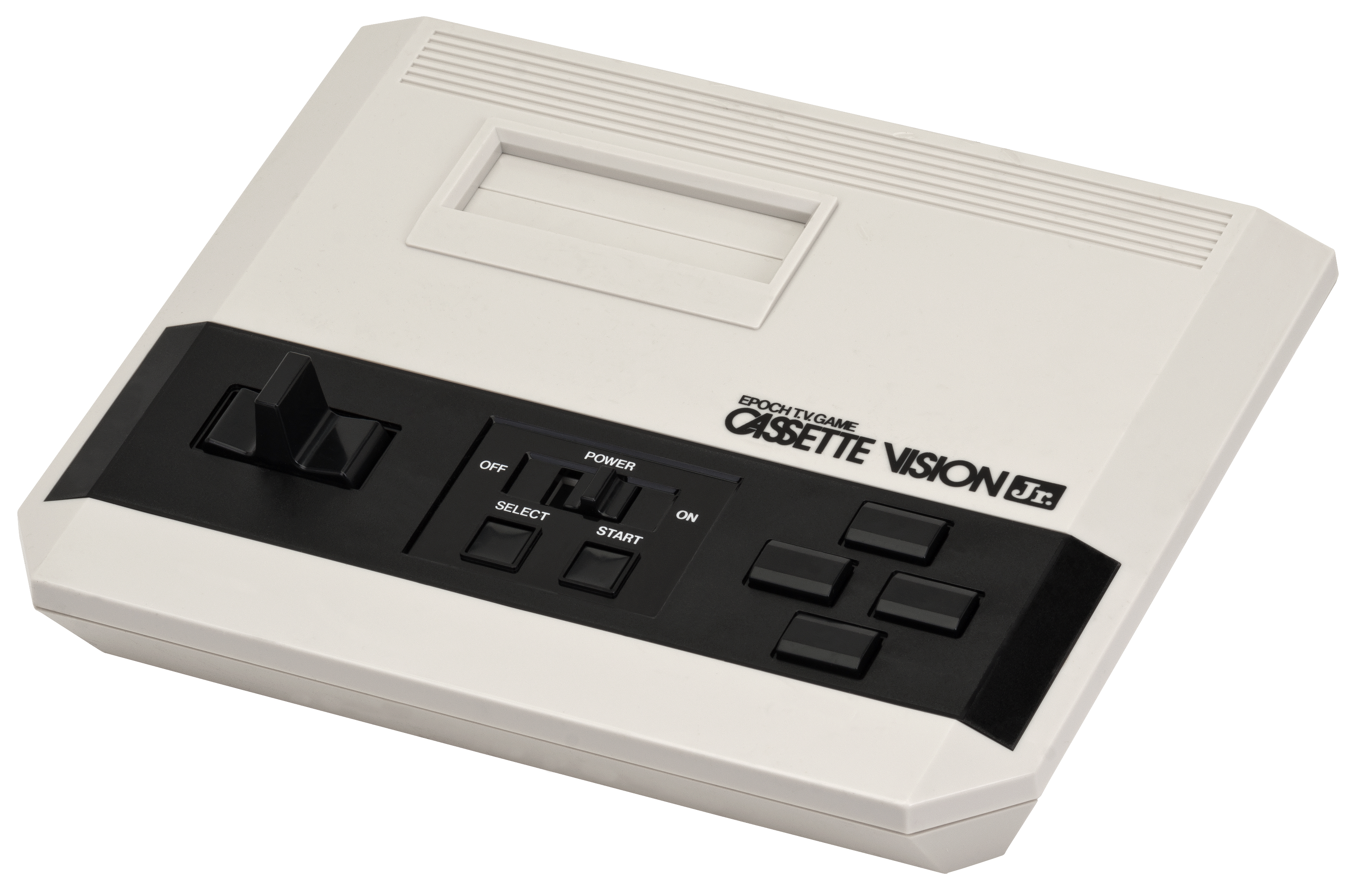
The Cassette Vision Jr., a cost-reduced and minimized version of the Cassette Vision released in 1983

Epoch had difficulty producing consoles and satisfying demand due to the costs of manufacturing them. In response, Epoch released the Cassette Vision Jr., a cost-effective remodel, on July 19, 1983. This version was priced at ¥5,000, far lower than the original model, and was designed specifically to be cheap and more affordable for consumers. The Cassette Vision Jr. retains most of the same features as the Cassette Vision, omitting the volume dial controller and having a redesigned keyboard layout to make certain games more intuitive to play. The Cassette Vision Jr. was successful for its low price point and lack of competition, and like its predecessor was commercially successful.

Four days before the Jr.'s release, Nintendo released the Family Computer (Famicom), which was similarly designed around interchangeable cartridges. The Famicom quickly overtook the Cassette Vision in popularity and became the leading game console in Japan, largely for its ability to produce high-quality conversions of arcade games like Donkey Kong. The Cassette Vision was unable to compete with the Famicom, and later Sega's SG-1000, due to the inferior hardware it possessed, as well as the market becoming cornered with other competing platforms from companies like Atari and Nichibutsu. Epoch chose to discontinue the Cassette Vision in August 1984 due to poor sales. It released Elevator Panic, its final game, in the same month. The company refocused its efforts on designing a successor to the Cassette Vision that could compete with Nintendo and Sega, which became the Super Cassette Vision. In its lifetime, the Cassette Vision sold an estimated 400,000 units.

== Games ==
PakPak Monster game on the Cassette Vision

There are eleven commercial releases for this system, and one unreleased:

- Kikori no Yosaku
- Baseball – a baseball game released by Epoch in 1981 (this game was playable before it came out for the Cassette Vision with the 1978 dedicated console TV Baseball)
- Galaxian (not based on Namco's game but on Nichibutsu's Moon Cresta)
- Big Sports 12 – a sports game released by Epoch in 1981.
- Battle Vader – a shoot 'em up released by Epoch in 1982 (this game was playable two years before it came out for the Cassette Vision with the 1980 dedicated console TV Vader)
- PakPak Monster (inspired by Pac-Man)
- New Baseball
- Monster Mansion (inspired by Donkey Kong)
- Astro Command – an action game released by Epoch in 1983 (inspired by Scramble)
- Monster Block (inspired by Pengo)
- Elevator Panic

=== Unreleased games ===
- Grand Champion (top-down racing game)

== Accessory ==
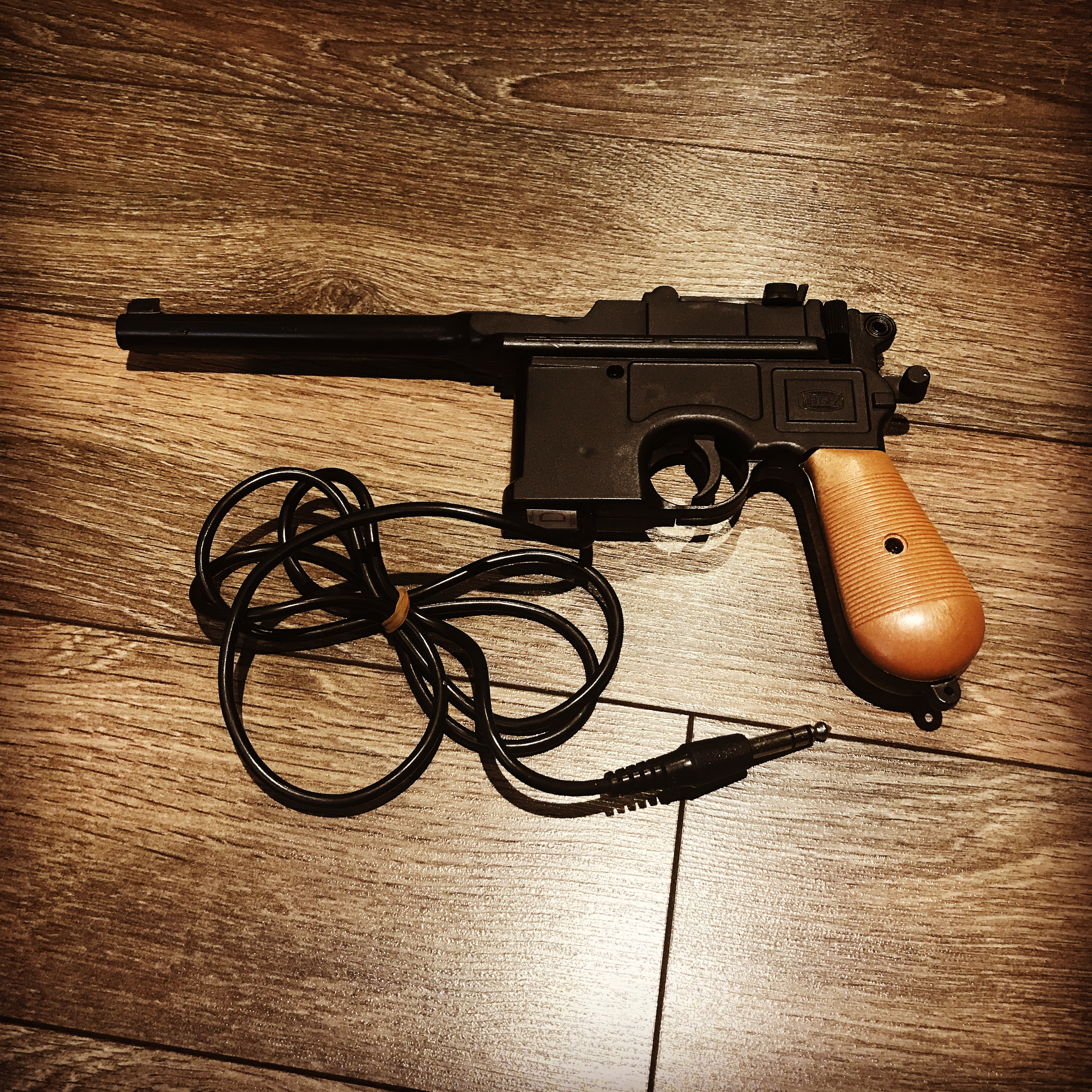
Light gun for the Cassette Vision

In the same year as the launch of the Cassette Vision, Epoch released a light gun to go with the Big Sports 12 game. The cartridge contains a collection of twelve games, including four that required the use of the light gun. The gun connects to the console via the aux connector. This is the only accessory available for the Cassette Vision and therefore the only peripheral that use the aux connection. This connector was later removed when Epoch released the Cassette Vision Jr, a trim down version of the Cassette Vision, making the Gun incompatible with that version of the console.

== Technical specifications ==
Epoch decided to capitalize on the NEC uPD77xx chipset, as they had already used to develop games on this platform (TV Baseball and TV Vader). To achieve this, Epoch decided to put the CPU (μPD777C or μPD778) directly in the cartridge while the shell of the console would only contain the power supply, the controls and the NTSC video and sound generation hardware.

According to documents posted online by NEC engineer Tetsuji Oguchi, the μPD777 has a resolution of 75 × 60 with up to twenty-five 7 × 7 pixel sprites in eight colors (six colors + orange + blue-cyan).

Sound was monophonic, but the chip was capable of generating polyphony.

Having the ROM, the RAM and the CPU in one chip, Epoch/NEC were able to create a chip that would support 48-bit instructions which was much faster than systems using a separate ROM at the time. Using 8-bit ROM through a bus would have divided the speed by 4. Although having only the ROM on the cartridge would have reduced their cost drastically, it would have greatly increased the cost of the console itself, incur more R&D cost and delay the release of the console.
