= Super Cassette Vision =

Home video game console by Epoch Co.

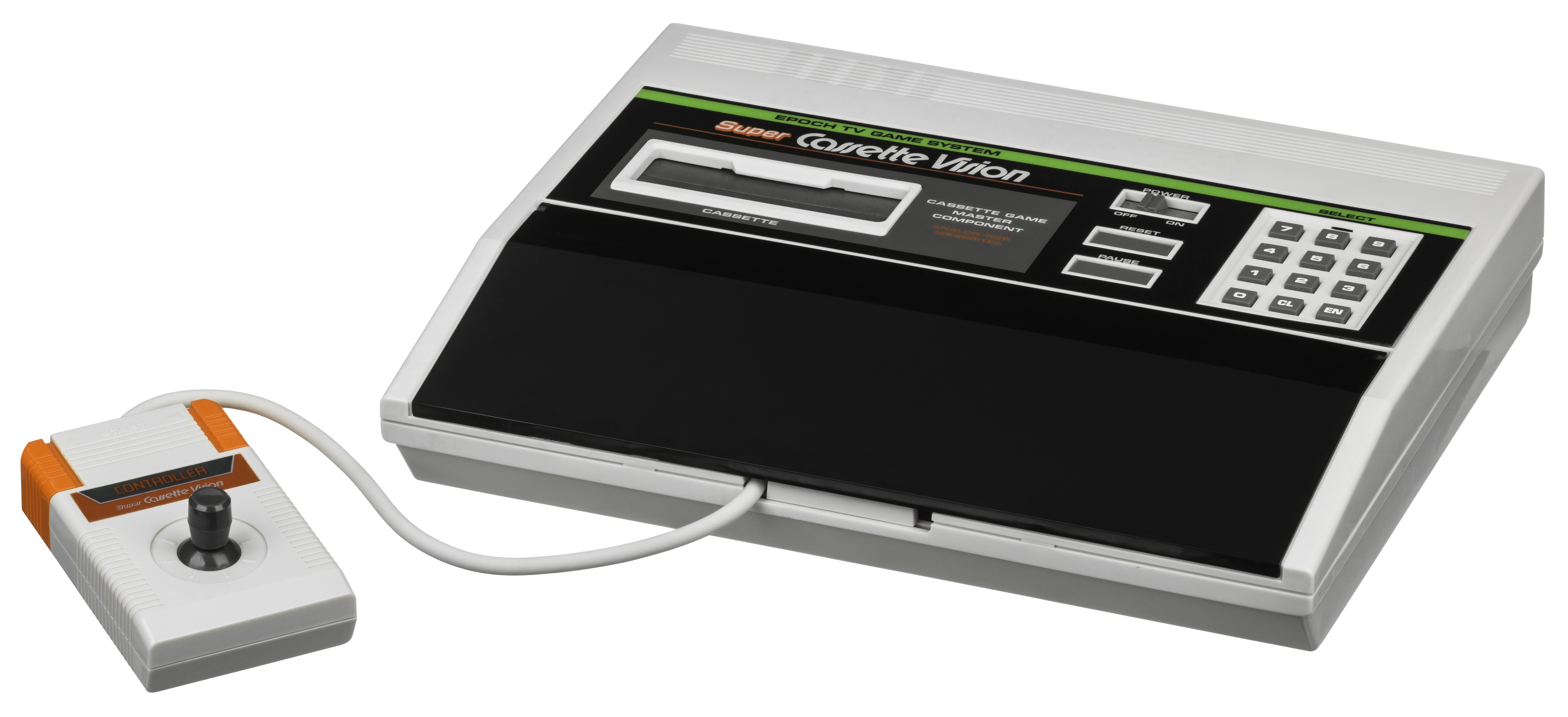
- A Super Cassette Vision and its accompanying joystick–based game controller
- Manufacturer: Epoch Co.
- Type: Home video game console
- Generation: Third
- Released: JP: July 17, 1984; EU: 1984
- Introductory price: ¥14,800
- Discontinued: 1987
- Units sold: c. 300,000
- Media: ROM cartridge
- CPU: NEC μPD7801G @ 4 MHz
- Memory: 128 bytes RAM, 4kB VRAM
- Display: 309×246 resolution, 16 colors, 128 on-screen sprites
- Graphics: EPOCH TV-1 VDC
- Sound: μPD1771C @ 6 MHz
- Predecessor: Cassette Vision

The Super Cassette Vision (Japanese: スーパーカセットビジョン, Hepburn: Sūpā Kasetto Bijon) is a home video game console made by Epoch Co. and released in Japan on July 17, 1984, and in Europe, specifically France, later in 1984. A successor to the Cassette Vision, it competed with Nintendo's Family Computer and Sega's SG-1000 line in Japan.

== History ==
Epoch's original Cassette Vision was introduced in Japan by Epoch in 1981, which had steady sales and took over 70% of the Japanese home console market at the time, with around 400,000 units sold. However, the introduction of next-generation systems from Nintendo, Casio and Sega quickly pushed back the original Cassette Vision, leading Epoch to quickly develop a successor.

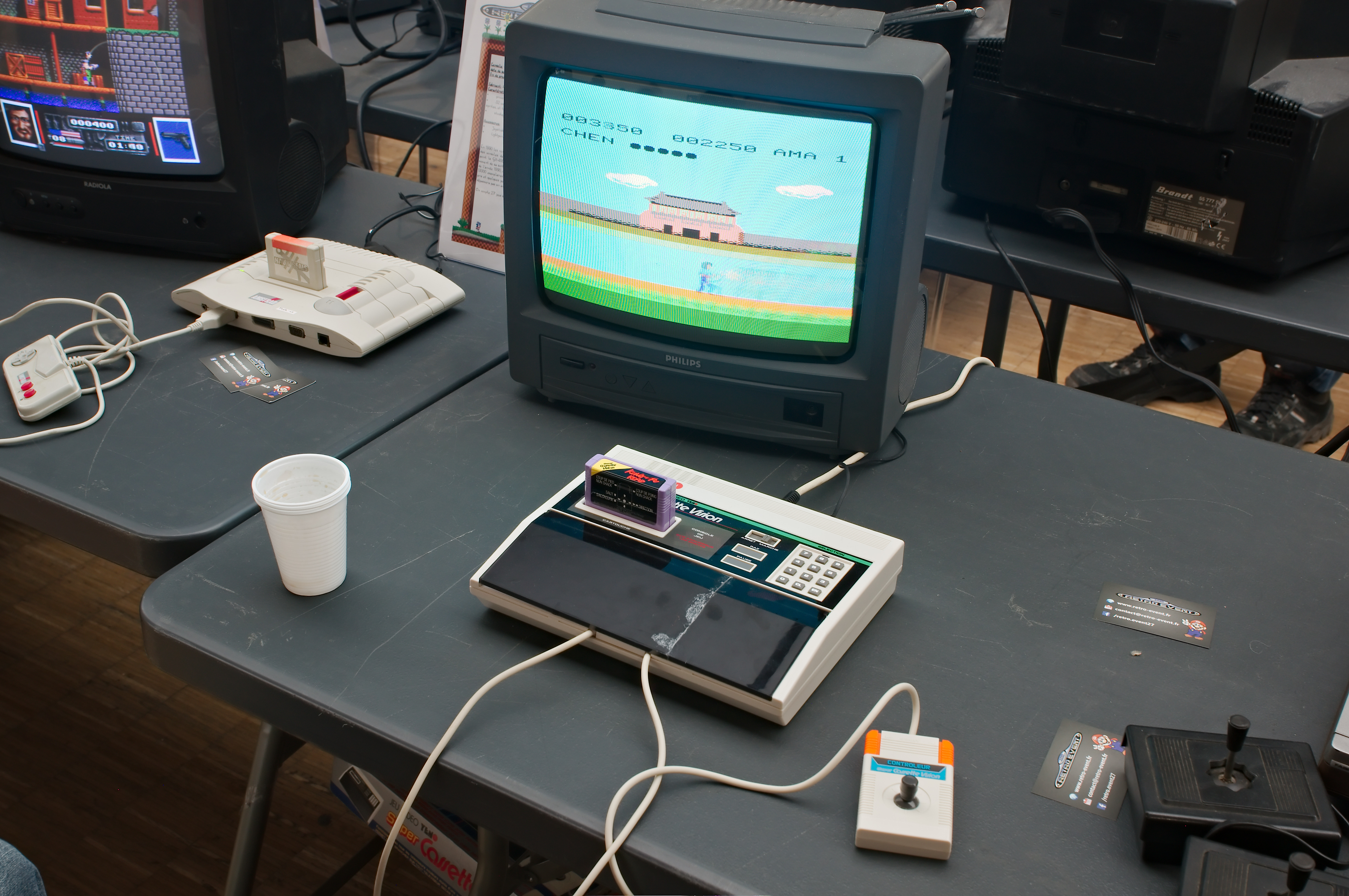
French Yeno Cassette Vision

The Super Cassette Vision was released in 1984 with a price of ¥14,800, featuring an 8-bit processor and better performance more in line with its competitors. It was later released in France by ITMC under the Yeno brand. At least sixteen games were brought over from Japan for a European release.

A version of the system targeting the young female market was released in 1985 as the Super Lady Cassette Vision (Japanese: スーパー カセットビジョン レディースセット) with a price of ¥19,300. This console came packed in a pink carrying case, alongside the game Milky Princess. The system did not take off, and was unable to match the massive popularity of the Nintendo Famicom, leading Epoch to drop out of the console market by 1987.

== Technical specifications ==
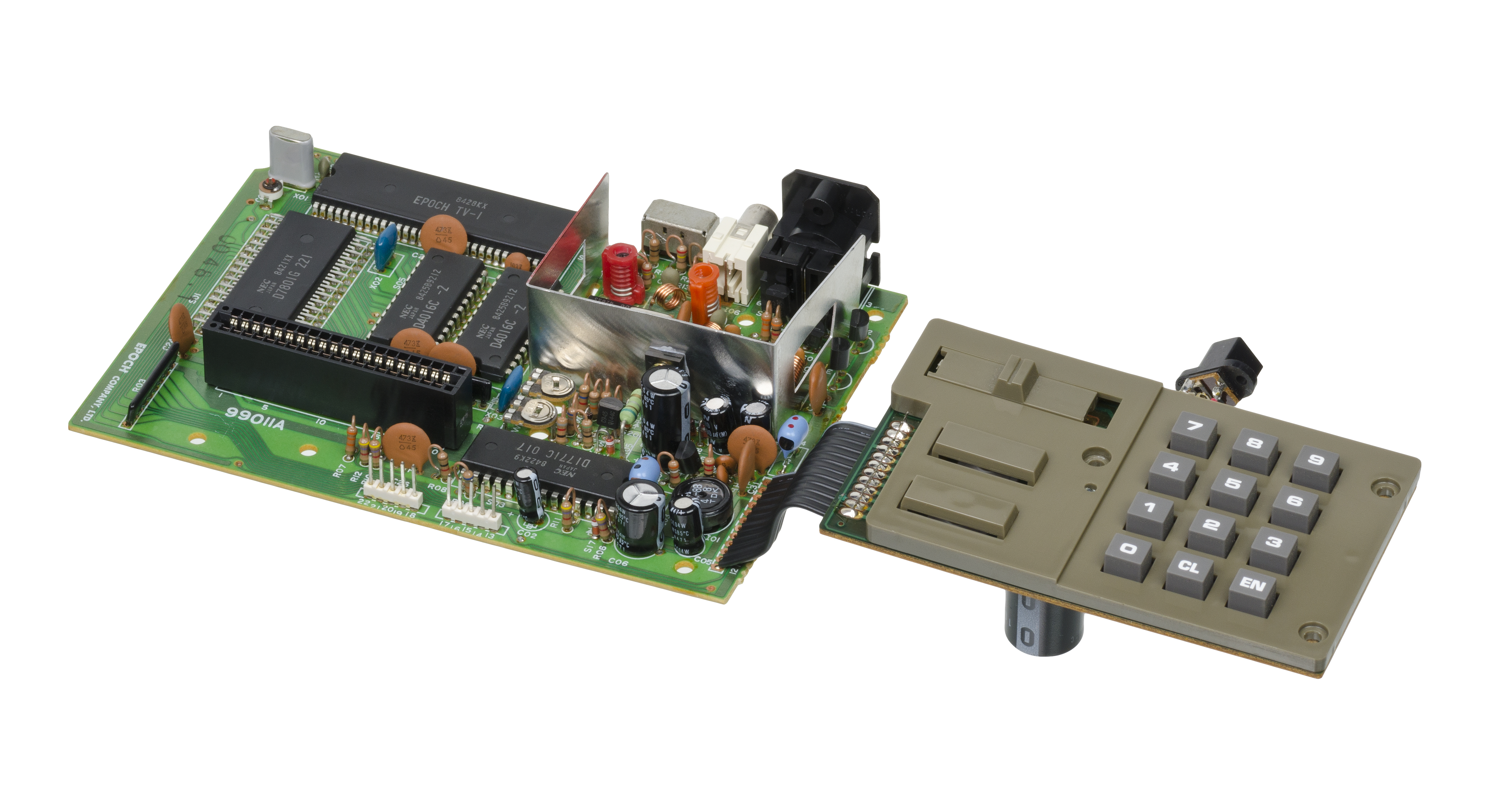
The motherboard and keypad of the Super Cassette Vision.

The Super Cassette Vision had the following hardware specifications:

- CPU: 8-bit NEC μPD7801G microcontroller @ 4 MHz
- RAM: 128 bytes (internal to CPU)
- ROM: 4 KB (internal to CPU)
- Video processor: EPOCH TV-1 VDC @ 14 MHz
- VRAM: 4 KB (2 × μPD4016C-2) + 2 KB (EPOCH TV-1 internal)
- Colors: 16
- Sprites: 128 monochrome sprites, 20 per line
- Display: 309 × 246
- Sound processor: μPD1771C @ 6 MHz
- Sound: produced by NEC μPD1771C running a permanently burnt-in program with three modes - monophonic preset wave mode, polyphonic (4-channel) square wave and noise mode and ADPCM codec mode
- Controllers: 2 × hard-wired joysticks

== Games ==
- 1. Astro Wars - Invaders from Space
- 2. Astro Wars II - Battle in Galaxy
- 3. Super Golf
- 4. Super Mahjong
- 5. Super Base Ball
  - Giants Hara Tatsunori no Super Base Ball
- 6. Punch Boy
- 7. Elevator Fight
- 8. Lupin III
- 9. Nebula
- 10. Wheelie Racer
- 11. Boulder Dash
- 12. Miner 2049er
- 13. Super Soccer
- 14. Comic Circus
- 15. Milky Princess
- 16. Pop and Chips
- 17. Nekketsu Kung-Fu Road
- 18. Star Speeder
- 19 TonTon Ball
- 20. Super Sansu-Puter
- 21. Shogi Nyuumon
- 22. Doraemon
- 23. BASIC Nyuumon (included four basic games)
- 24. Dragon Slayer
- 25. Rantou Pro-Wrestling
- 26. WaiWai(Y2) Monster Land
- 27. Dragon Ball: The Great Unexplored Dragon Region
- 28. Mappy
- 29. Sky Kid
- 30. Pole Position II

=== Unreleased games ===
- Black Hole
- Super Derby
- Super Rugby
