= TV Tennis Electrotennis =

First Japanese video game console

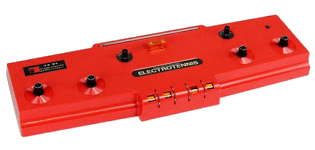
- A TV Tennis Electrotennis
- Also known as: TV Tennis; Electrotennis; (abbreviations)
- Manufacturer: Epoch Co.
- Type: Dedicated home video game console
- Generation: First generation
- Released: JP: September 12, 1975
- Introductory price: 19,000 Japanese yen
- Units sold: Not clear; around 10,000, 20,000 or 3 million
- Successor: TV Game System 10

The TV Tennis Electrotennis (Japanese: テレビテニス, Hepburn romanization: Terebitenisu, meaning Television Tennis, commonly abbreviated as TV Tennis or Electrotennis) is a dedicated first-generation home video game console that was developed and released by Epoch Co. on September 12, 1975, for 19,000 Japanese yen only in Japan. It was the first video game console released in Japan.

It was released several months before the release of Home Pong in North America. One unique feature of the TV Tennis Electrotennis is that the console is connected Wirelessly to a TV, functioning through an UHF antenna. Depending on the source, it sold about 10,000, 20,000 or 3 million units in its lifetime, including about 5,000 units in the first year.

== Legacy ==
The successor of the TV Tennis Electrotennis is the TV Game System 10 from 1977. It includes as a light gun a plastic replica of a Mauser C96; the C96 replica was also usable with its next console, the Epoch Cassette Vision, created in 1981.

The wireless broadcast functionality of the TV Tennis Electrotennis got Nintendo designer Masayuki Uemura to consider adding that capability to the Famicom (Nintendo Entertainment System), though he ultimately did not pursue it to keep system costs low.
