= The Amazing Spider-Man: Lethal Foes =

1995 video game

- Developer: Argent
- Publisher: Epoch Co.
- Designers: Takaki Kobayashi; Akira Ohtaka; Keita Abe; Shinobu Nakabachi
- Composers: Shoji Tomii; Minoru Endo; Makoto Igarashi; Daisuke Inoue
- Series: Spider-Man
- Platform: Super Famicom
- Release: JP: March 17, 1995
- Genre: Platform
- Mode: Single-player

The Amazing Spider-Man: Lethal Foes (Note: Supaidāman Rīsaru Fōzu (スパイダーマン リーサルフォーズ)) is a 1995 platform game for the Super Famicom featuring the Marvel Comics character Spider-Man, released in Japan. The game's name appears to have been inspired by the 1993 limited series The Lethal Foes of Spider-Man, though its plot does not resemble that of the comic beyond including multiple Spider-Man villains.

The cover art for the game was designed by comic book artists Mark Bagley, Karl Kesel, and Paul Mounts.

== Gameplay ==
One of the villains in the game is the Beetle.

Spider-Man's web-swinging abilities can be used to get to various places. Each level has a timed checkpoint within each level, as players must reach their destination within the time limit. Spider-Man battles various villains throughout the game – Spider-Slayers, Beetle, Lizard, Mysterio, Alistair Smythe, Green Goblin, Scorpion, Venom, Doctor Octopus, and Carnage. In addition friendly characters including Human Torch, Speedball, and Iron Fist appear in cutscenes in between levels.

Additional content was unlocked by scanning barcodes with Barcode Battler II connected via a "Barcode Battler II Interface".

== Plot ==
After past defeats, Doctor Octopus escapes from prison and forces Curt Connors to help him. Connors attempts to use the Lizard serum to increase his power, but fails. Thus, Lizard becomes Octopus' new employee, while Octopus hires scientist Spencer Smythe to create the Spider Slayers and attack Spider-Man. Meanwhile, Spider-Man attempts to stop Beetle from robbing a bank, but is attacked by the Spider Slayers. While Spider-Man manages to defeat the Spider Slayers, Beetle escapes and is subsequently hired by Octopus. Meanwhile, astronaut John Jameson is attacked by a red and black goo on his spaceship. Spider-Man defeats Beetle, and also defeats Lizard and uses the antidote on him, though it only takes him out of Octopus' control. Mysterio, hearing of Octopus' plans, traps Spider-Man in his headquarters, but Spider-Man defeats him and realizes he left a GPS that tracks Octopus' arms (given to Mysterio when he last helped Octopus). After realizing someone is tracking him using the GPS, Octopus gains Mark II arms with more tentacles and forcefully transforms Alistair Smythe into a human/Spider Slayer hybrid. Meanwhile, Spider-Man tracks the GPS to Octopus' old arms, where he ambushed by Smythe. Later, Octopus sends Green Goblin after Spider-Man, and he chases him across the city. Venom ambushes the Goblin Glider, but Spider-Man stops him. The Venom symbiote leaves Eddie Brock, who informs Spider-Man of Carnage's plan to destroy New York. Doctor Octopus suddenly attacks them, but his new arms are prototypes and begin to explode, causing Spider-Man to celebrate in triumph. Suddenly, the symbiotes come through a portal in the sky. Spider-Man defeats Carnage, who gets sucked back into space with the other symbiotes. Spider-Man celebrates and is victorious. Later, J. Jonah Jameson reads a Daily Bugle article on Spider-Man’s victory, and attempts to write a paper which makes the symbiotes the heroes. Betty Brant scoffs and shreds the paper.

== Reception ==
On release, Famicom Tsūshin scored the game a 21 out of 40.

== See also ==
- Spider-Man in video games
