= Epoch Co. =

Japanese toy and computer games company

Epoch Company, Ltd.
- Type: Private
- Industry: Video games, toy industry
- Founded: May 1958; 68 years ago
- Headquarters: Komagata, Taitō, Tokyo, Japan
- Number of employees: 220
- Website: https://epoch.jp/

Epoch Company, Ltd. (株式会社エポック社, Kabushikigaisha Epokku Sha) is a Japanese toy and computer games company founded in 1958 which is best known for manufacturing Barcode Battler and Doraemon video games, Aquabeads, and the Sylvanian Families series of toys. Its current Representative President is Michihiro Maeda.

They also made Japan's first successful programmable console video game system, the Cassette Vision, in 1981.

== History ==
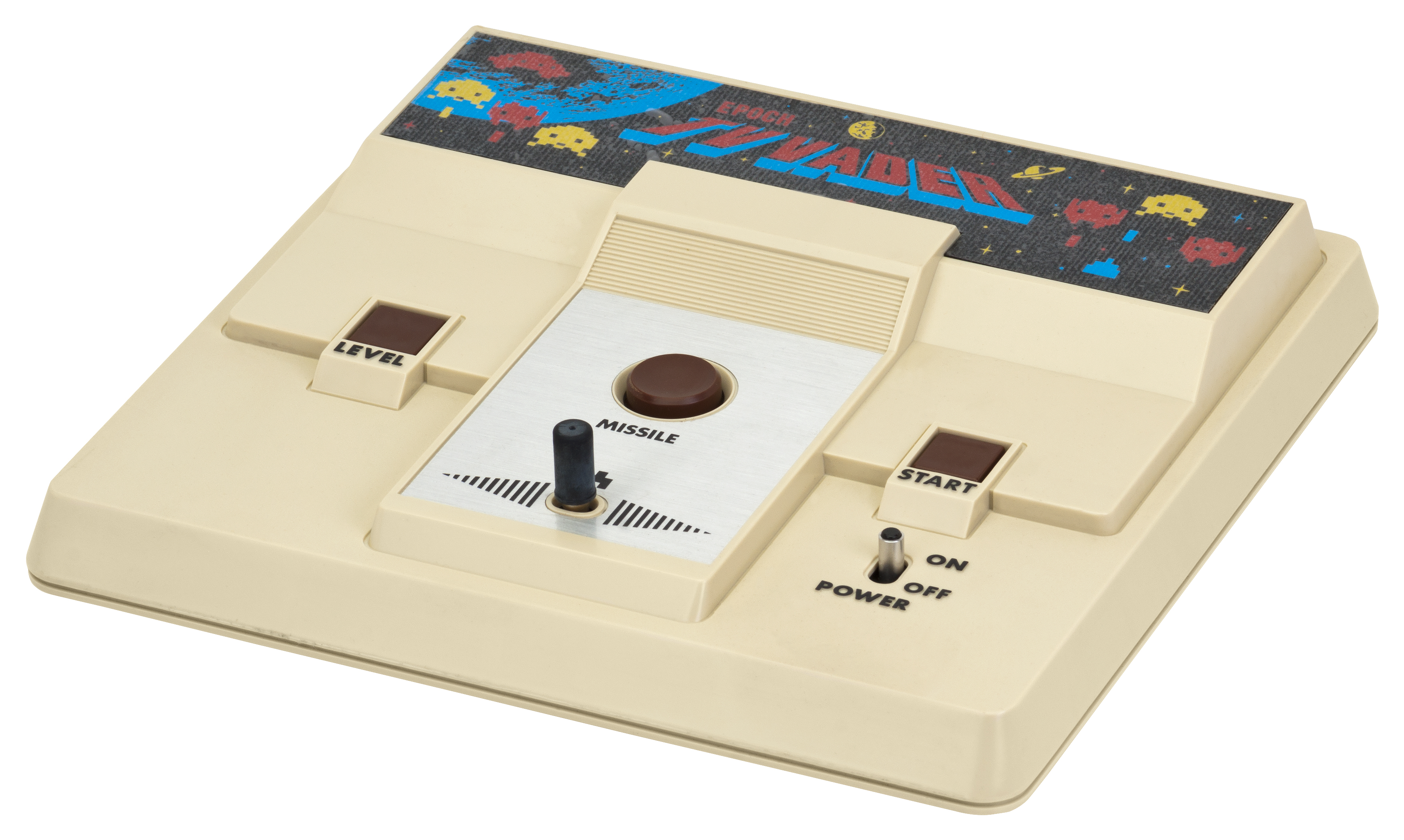
The TV Vader, a dedicated home video game console that played a Space Invaders clone

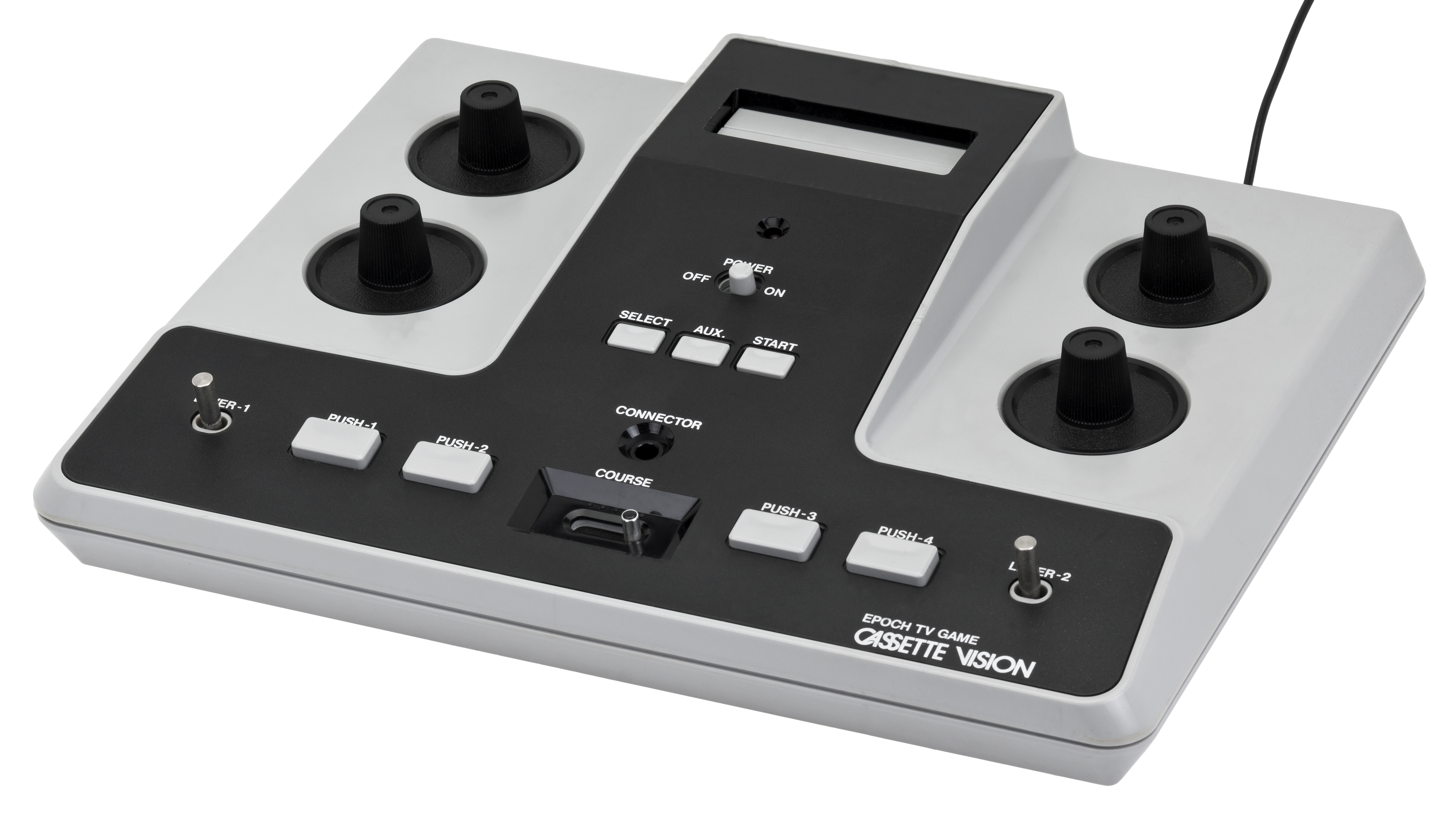
The Cassette Vision

Founded in May 1958 by Maeda Taketora and three others in Tokyo with ¥1 million, Maeda Taketora is made president, eleven months later, it had increased its capital to ¥2.5 million. Epoch participated in the first Japanese international toy trade fair in 1962. It moved to its headquarters to its current location in Tokyo in 1963. After 20 years of its founding in 1978, Epoch had increased to ¥200 million - 200 times the original startup cost. It also had a United States office, which sold imported English versions of its products. In September 2001 it founded an international branch. It acquired International Playthings of the United States in 2008. It is most famous for its Doraemon and Sylvanian Families toy and video game productions.

=== Video game consoles ===
- TV Tennis Electrotennis (September 12, 1975)
- TV Game System 10 (1977)
- TV Baseball (1978)
- TV Block (1979)
- Cassette TV Game (1979)
- TV Vader (1980)
- Cassette Vision (July 30, 1981)
- Cassette Vision Jr. (1983)
- Super Cassette Vision (July 17, 1984)
- Epoch Game Pocket Computer (1984, first programmable handheld game console)
- SCV Lady's Set (1985)
- Barcode Battler (March 1991)

=== LCD handheld electronic games ===
Epoch also created many LCD handheld electronic games. Some of these were made in cooperation with ITMC, Gama-Mangold, Tomy and other companies.

== Games produced ==
=== Doraemon games ===
- Doraemon: Giga Zombie no Gyakushuu
- Doraemon
- Doraemon 2
- Doraemon 3
- Doraemon 4
- Doraemon: Nobita to Fukkatsu no Hoshi
- Doraemon 2: SOS! Otogi no Kuni
- Doraemon
- Doraemon Kart
- Doraemon no GameBoy de Asobou yo DX10
- Doraemon 2
- Doraemon Kart 2
- Doraemon: Aruke Aruke Labyrinth
- Doraemon Memories: Nobita no Omoide Daibouken
- Doraemon: Nobita to 3-tsu no Seirei Ishi (N64)
- Doraemon 2: Nobita to Hikari no Shinden (N64)
- Doraemon 3: Nobita no Machi SOS! (N64)
- Doraemon 3: Makai no Dungeon
- Doraemon no Study Boy: Kuku Game
- Doraemon no Study Boy: Gakushuu Kanji Game
- Doraemon Kimi to Pet no Monogatari
- Doraemon Board Game
- Doraemon no Quiz Boy 2
- Doraemon no Study Boy: Kanji Yomikaki Master

=== Sylvanian Families games ===
- Sylvanian Families: Otogi no Kuni no Pendant (シルバニアファミリー おとぎの国のペンダント, Shirubania famirī: Otogi no kuni no pendanto; lit. Sylvanian Families: The Fairyland Pendant) (Game Boy Color)
- Sylvanian Melodies ~Mori no Nakama to Odori Masho!~ (シルバニアメロディー ～森のなかまと踊りましょ!～, Shirubania merodī ~Mori no naka ma to odorimasho!~; lit. Sylvanian Melodies ~Let's Dance with the Forest Friends!~) (Game Boy Color)
- Sylvanian Families 2: Irozuku Mori no Fantasy (シルバニアファミリー2 色づく森のファンタジー, Shirubania famirī tsu: Irodzuku mori no fantajī; lit.Sylvanian Families 2: Rainbow Forest Fantasy) (Game Boy Color)
- Sylvanian Families 3: Hoshifuru Yoru no Sunadokei (シルバニアファミリー3 星ふる夜のすなどけい, Shirubania famirī suri: Hoshifuru yoru no sunadokei; lit. Sylvanian Families 3: Hourglass of the Wishing Stars) (Game Boy Color)
- Sylvanian Families 4: Meguru Kisetsu no Tapestry (シルバニアファミリー4 めぐる季節のタペストリー, Shirubania famirī fo: Meguru kisetsu no tapesutorī; lit. Sylvanian Families 4: Tapestry of the Four Seasons) (Game Boy Advance)
- Sylvanian Families: Yosei no Stick to Fushigi no Ki Maron Inu no Onnanoko (シルバニアファミリー 妖精のステッキとふしぎの木 マロン犬の女の子, Shirubania famirī: Yōsei no sutekki to fushigi no ki maron inu no on'nanoko; lit. Sylvanian Families: The Fairy's Wands and the Mystery Tree Esme Huckleberry) (Game Boy Advance)
- Sylvanian Families: Fashion Designer ni Naritai! Kurumi Risu no Onnanoko (シルバニアファミリー ファッションデザイナーになりたい! くるみリスの女の子, Shirubania famirī: fasshondezainā ni naritai! Kurumi risu no on'nanoko; lit. Sylvanian Families: I wanna be a Fashion Designer! Saffron Walnut) (Game Boy Advance)

=== Licensed games ===
- Chibi Maruko-chan: Harikiri 365-Nichi no Maki
- Lupin III: Densetsu no Hihō o Oe!
- The Amazing Spider-Man: Lethal Foes
- Donald Duck no Mahō no Bōshi
- St Andrews: Eikō to Rekishi no Old Course
- Alice no Paint Adventure
- Chibi Maruko-Chan: Go-Chōnai Minna de Game da yo!
- Dragon Ball: The Great Unexplored Dragon Region

=== Other games ===
- Famicom Yakyuuban
- Kiteretsu Daihyakka
- Cyraid
- Dragon Slayer I
- Parasol Henbee
- Dai Meiro: Meikyu no Tatsujin
- Dragon Slayer (Game Boy)
- Dragon Slayer Gaiden (Game Boy)
- Dragon Slayer: The Legend of Heroes (Super Famicom)
- Dragon Slayer: The Legend of Heroes II (Super Famicom)
- Panel no Ninja Kesamaru
- Lord Monarch
- Metal Jack
- Barcode Battler Senki
- Hatayama Hatch no Pro Yakyuu News! Jitsumei Han
- Oha Star Yamachan & Reimondo
- Hole in One Golf
- Meisha Retsuden: Greatest 70's
- J.League Excite Stage '94
- J.League Excite Stage '95
- J.League Excite Stage '96
- J-League Excite Stage GB
- J-League Excite Stage Tactics
- International Soccer Excite Stage 2000
- R-Type DX
- Ling Rise
- Pocket Pro Yakyuu
- Macross 7: Ginga no Heart o Furuwasero!!
- Gauntlet Legends
- DaiaDroids World
- Kidou Tenshi Angelic Layer
- The Legend of Zelda: A Link to the Past (Barcode Battler II)
- Magi Nation
- Daia Droid Daisakusen
