= Spider-Man (2002 video game) =

Action-adventure game

- Developers: Treyarch (PS2, GC, Xbox); LTI Gray Matter (Windows); Digital Eclipse (GBA)
- Publisher: Activision
- Director: Chris Soares
- Producer: Jonathan Zamkoff
- Designer: Tomo Moriwaki
- Writer: Matthew B. Rhoades
- Composer: Michael McCuistion
- Series: Spider-Man
- Platform: PlayStation 2 GameCube Xbox Windows Game Boy Advance
- Release: NA: April 16, 2002; EU: June 7, 2002
- Genre: Action-adventure
- Mode: Single-player

Spider-Man is a 2002 action-adventure game based on the 2002 film of the same name. It was released for the PlayStation 2, Xbox, Nintendo GameCube, Microsoft Windows, and Game Boy Advance on April 16, 2002, in North America, and June 7, 2002 in Europe. The GBA version was later re-released and bundled on a twin pack cartridge with Spider-Man 2 in 2005. Published by Activision, the console versions were developed by the company's then-recently acquired subsidiary Treyarch, who had previously ported Neversoft's Spider-Man to the Dreamcast. LTI Gray Matter developed the Microsoft Windows version (and also ported the Neversoft game the previous year), while Digital Eclipse developed the GBA version.

The game mainly follows the story of its film counterpart, but expands upon various scenes and plot points with additional villains and locations absent from the film. Some members of the film's cast reprise their roles for the game, such as Tobey Maguire as Peter Parker/Spider-Man and Willem Dafoe as Norman Osborn/Green Goblin.

Upon release, the game received a generally positive response from critics and quickly became a bestseller. Praise was centered around its presentation, combat, and web mechanics, although some criticized its short length, voice acting, and camera controls. Following the game's success, Treyarch became the lead developer of all major Spider-Man titles published under Activision until 2008, including the sequels Spider-Man 2, the video game based on the 2004 film of the same name, and Spider-Man 3, the video game based on the 2007 film of the same name.

== Gameplay ==
Like the 2000 Spider-Man game and its 2001 sequel, Spider-Man 2: Enter: Electro, Spider-Man is a level-based beat 'em up video game, where the player takes on the role of the superhero Spider-Man. While most levels are indoors, several levels are set outside, among the skyscrapers of NYC, which require the player to web-sling from building to building, as falling below a certain height will result in instant death. Levels use a scoring system that covers more aspects, such as "Time" (clear level in a set time), "Perfect" (not take damage/not be detected) and "Style" (use as many combos as possible). Some levels have other specific aspects, such as "Secrets" (uncover a secret area), "Combat" (defeat all enemies), and "stealth" (remain undetected by enemies). Players can gain points, depending on difficulty, for completing these tasks. On easy mode, each bonus is 500 points, normal is 700 points, and hero is 1000 points each.

The basic abilities are swinging, zipping, punching and kicking, dodging, web, camera lock, and the Web Mode in Enhanced Mode. Depending on how the player combines different buttons, it will have different results. Wall-crawling is automatic, and players can lift heavy and light objects such as cars and chairs. There are 21 combos, which are unlocked by collecting Gold Spiders, with 4 web controls, each having a type of "upgrade" to each. The game also features stealth segments, where Spider-Man can hide in the shadows and remain undetected from the enemy. While the game is primarily in third-person, a cheat code allows players to switch to first-person view.

Completing the story mode on each difficulty unlocks different bonuses, namely alternate skins for Spider-Man: completing it on at least easy unlocks Peter Parker in his civilian outfit and Spider-Man's wrestler costume; on at least normal, Alex Ross' prototype design for the movie Spider-Man costume (which will also cause the Green Goblin to have Ross' early design during battles); and on at least hard, the Green Goblin. Unlike the others, The Goblin plays differently from Spider-Man, replacing his web-based abilities with Oscorp weaponry, such as his signature glider, pumpkin bombs, and razor bats. If playing as the Goblin in story mode, while the levels remain unchanged, the narrative is different. It follows Harry Osborn as he becomes the Goblin after his father's death and investigates a secret plot involving Oscorp, while facing off against another Goblin, who claims to have been hired by Norman Osborn.

More character-skins can be unlocked through cheat codes, such as the Shocker and Captain George Stacy. Mary Jane Watson was initially unlockable through a code as well, but was dropped in re-releases due to the perceived lesbianism implications of scenes featuring the player (playing as Mary Jane) kissing with the in-game Mary Jane.

== Plot ==
Outcast teen genius Peter Parker develops spider-like superhuman abilities after being bitten by a genetically altered spider. He enters a wrestling competition for personal gain; however, the fight promoter cheats him out of his prize money. The promoter is then robbed by a robber, whom Peter lets go out of spite. Shortly afterward, Peter is devastated when his Uncle Ben is killed by a robber, whom the police identify as the leader of the Skulls gang. Peter tracks down and defeats the murderer at a warehouse, only to discover that he is the same robber he let go earlier, who then dies after accidentally slipping out of a window. Remembering Ben's words that "with great power comes great responsibility," Peter vows to use his powers to fight evil and becomes the masked superhero Spider-Man. He also gets a job at the Daily Bugle as a photographer after selling photos of himself as Spider-Man.

Meanwhile, Oscorp CEO Norman Osborn and his scientists are investigating Spider-Man. Anxious to develop his super-soldier serum, the main goals of which are already exhibited by Spider-Man, Osborn sends robots to capture him, but Spider-Man destroys them. Later, Spider-Man witnesses the Shocker and the Vulture robbing a jewelry store and escaping separately. Spider-Man pursues Shocker through the sewers and into a subway station, where he defeats him. Not wanting to let the Vulture get away with his share of the loot, Shocker tells Spider-Man that he is hiding in an old clock tower. Spider-Man climbs the tower and chases the escaping Vulture through the city, defeating him on top of the Chrysler Building and retrieving the stolen goods.

Oscorp creates several spider-shaped robots to capture Spider-Man, but they mistake Scorpion for Spider-Man due to him also having arachnid DNA. After returning to the subway station to take photos of his battle site with Shocker, Spider-Man runs into Scorpion and helps him fight off the spider bots. However, an increasingly paranoid Scorpion attacks Spider-Man, believing he is trying to take him back to the scientists who experimented on him. Scorpion is defeated but manages to escape.

Osborn is fired from Oscorp for failing to complete the super-soldier serum on time. He decides to test it on himself, creating a psychopathic alternate personality, and attacks the yearly Oscorp Unity Day Festival as the Green Goblin to kill those who fired him. Peter's friend and crush, Mary Jane Watson, is caught in the chaos, but Peter intervenes as Spider-Man and rescues her. Grateful, she kisses him as a spider bot photographs them from afar. Spider-Man fights the Goblin, stopping him from harming more bystanders. Impressed, the Goblin offers Spider-Man a chance to join him, but the latter refuses. The Goblin reveals he has planted bombs filled with deadly gas all over the city and escapes while Spider-Man finds and disarms the bombs.

In the Xbox version only, Osborn hires Kraven the Hunter to capture Spider-Man. Luring him to a zoo, Kraven poisons him and forces him to complete an obstacle course filled with deadly traps while hunting him. Ultimately, Spider-Man defeats Kraven and leaves him for the police, obtaining an antidote for the poison.

After another battle with the Goblin, Spider-Man studies a piece of his gear and learns that Oscorp manufactured it. Infiltrating Oscorp to investigate further, he discovers chemical weapons and a giant robot being made, and neutralizes both. Spider-Man enters Osborn's office and learns that the Goblin knows about Mary Jane after seeing the photograph of her kissing him. Deducing that the Goblin kidnapped Mary Jane to lure him, Spider-Man escapes from Oscorp and chases the Goblin to the Queensboro Bridge, where he rescues Mary Jane and defeats the villain. The Goblin unmasks himself as Osborn and accidentally gets impaled by his glider in a final attempt to kill Spider-Man. Before he dies, Osborn asks Spider-Man not to reveal his identity as the Goblin to his son Harry. Spider-Man attempts to reveal his identity to Mary Jane, but stops when she kisses him. As the camera zooms out, Spider-Man breaks the fourth wall, telling the player to "go outside and play."

== Development ==
Activision said Spider-Man was among North America's top 5 best-selling franchises in 2002. The PS2 version of the game was ranked at number 7 in sales among video game titles released in 2002 in the United States, which was mostly dominated by Grand Theft Auto titles. The game made both PlayStation's Greatest Hits and Xbox's Platinum Hits collections.

Spider-Man was developed in 18 months, compared to 2 years in development for its sequel, Spider-Man 2. The game was designed to be linear, and the web-swinging mechanics were basic compared to its sequel, with strands shooting into the sky without attaching to anything.

The game was inspired by the 2002 film Spider-Man when it came to web-swinging. They developed the game at the same time as the movie was made, which meant that the game designers would not have been able to watch the entire film until it was finished. Film actors Tobey Maguire and Willem Dafoe reprise their roles as Spider-Man and the Green Goblin, respectively, while Bruce Campbell, who played a wrestling ring announcer in the movie, narrates the game's tutorial and bonus levels.

== Reception ==
Reception

Aggregate scores
Aggregator	Score				
Aggregator	GBA	GameCube	PC	PS2	Xbox
GameRankings	78%	76%	75%	76%	78%
Metacritic	N/A	76/100	75/100	76/100	79/100

Review scores
Publication	Score				
Publication	GBA	GameCube	PC	PS2	Xbox
AllGame	2.5/5	N/A	N/A	3.5/5	3.5/5
Edge	N/A	N/A	N/A	N/A	4/10
Electronic Gaming Monthly	6.67/10	6.5/10	N/A	6.33/10	6.5/10
Eurogamer	6/10	N/A	N/A	N/A	N/A
Game Informer	8.5/10	8/10	N/A	7.75/10	8.25/10
GamePro	4.5/5	N/A	N/A	4.5/5	4.5/5
GameRevolution	N/A	B	N/A	C+	B
GameSpot	7.2/10	7.4/10	7.5/10	7.4/10	7.5/10
GameSpy	N/A	76%	78%	72%	80%
GameZone	7/10	9.2/10	8.3/10	9/10	8.8/10
IGN	8.8/10	7.6/10	8/10	8.4/10	8.4/10
Nintendo Power	4.1/5	4.4/5	N/A	N/A	N/A
Official U.S. PlayStation Magazine	N/A	N/A	N/A	4.5/5	N/A
Official Xbox Magazine (US)	N/A	N/A	N/A	N/A	7.9/10
PC Gamer (US)	N/A	N/A	80%	N/A	N/A

The critical reviews for the game were positive. GameRankings gave it a score of 78% for the GBA version, 76% for the GCN version, 75% for the PC version, 76% for the PS2 version, 78% for the Xbox version; and likewise, Metacritic gave it a score of 77 out of 100 for the GCN version, 75 out of 100 for the PC version, 76 out of 100 for the PS2 version, and 79 out of 100 for the Xbox version.

Many critics at the time considered it the best Spider-Man game. However, criticism fell on the indoor levels, Tobey Maguire's voice acting and bad camera, as well as the fact that it was too short and could easily be completed in 3 hours. The Cincinnati Enquirer gave the game 4/5 stars and stated that it was "worth climbing the walls for".

By July 2006, the PS2 version of Spider-Man had sold 2.1 million copies and earned $74 million in the United States. Next Generation ranked it as the 15th highest-selling game launched for the PS2, Xbox or GCN between January 2000 and July 2006 in that country. Combined sales of Spider-Man console games released in the 2000s reached 6 million units in the USA by July 2006. The PS2 version also received a "Platinum" sales award from the ELSPA, indicating sales of over 300,000 copies in the UK. The GCN and Xbox versions sold over 400,000 copies each. These high sales allowed the game to enter the "Best-Sellers" of each console (PS2's Greatest Hits, GCN's Player's Choice and Xbox's Platinum Hits). It was recently promoted to "Best of Platinum Hits" on the Xbox. In the USA, its GBA version sold 740,000 copies and earned $23 million by August 2006. During the period between January 2000 and August 2006, it was the 30th highest-selling game launched for the GBA, NDS, or PSP in that country.
