= Spider-Man 3 (video game) =

2007 video game

- North American Windows cover art
- Developers: Treyarch (360, Windows, PS3) (Note: Ported to Windows by Beenox); Vicarious Visions (PS2, PSP, Wii, DS, GBA)
- Publisher: Activision
- Composer: Tobias Enhus
- Series: Spider-Man
- Platforms: PlayStation 3; PlayStation 2; Xbox 360; Windows; Wii; Game Boy Advance; Nintendo DS; PlayStation Portable
- Release: Xbox 360, PS2, Windows, Wii, GBA, Nintendo DS: WW: May 4, 2007; PS3: NA: May 4, 2007; EU: May 18, 2007; AU: September 20, 2007; PlayStation Portable: NA: October 16, 2007; EU: November 2, 2007; AU: December 4, 2007
- Genre: Action-adventure
- Modes: Single-player, multiplayer (DS)

Spider-Man 3 is a 2007 action-adventure game loosely based on the 2007 film of the same name. The game is the sequel to 2004's Spider-Man 2, itself based on the 2004 film of the same name. It was released for the PlayStation 3, PlayStation 2, Xbox 360, Microsoft Windows, Wii, Nintendo DS, and Game Boy Advance on May 4, 2007, and for the PlayStation Portable on October 16, 2007. Published by Activision, the PlayStation 3 and Xbox 360 versions were developed by Treyarch, while Vicarious Visions handled the development of the other versions, which are drastically different. Beenox ported Treyarch's version of the game to Microsoft Windows.

The game plays similarly to two of Treyarch's previous Spider-Man titles, Spider-Man 2 and Ultimate Spider-Man, incorporating an open world design that allows players to freely explore a fictitious representation of Manhattan when not completing missions to advance the narrative. The symbiote costume from the film is a major gameplay mechanic, increasing Spider-Man's strength and unlocking new abilities. While the game directly adapts the plot of the film, it builds upon it by including additional characters and elements from the Spider-Man comic books and other aspects of the Marvel Universe. Most actors reprise their roles from the film, including Tobey Maguire, James Franco (the first time he does so as Josh Keaton provided Harry's voice in the previous two games), Topher Grace, Thomas Haden Church, and J. K. Simmons. Bruce Campbell, who played a French maître d' in the film, narrates the game's tutorial level.

With the exception of the Nintendo DS version, which received mostly positive reviews, Spider-Man 3 was met with a mixed critical response. Most of the criticism was aimed at the game's graphics, short length, and technical issues, as well as being too similar to its predecessors. The drastic differences between platforms was another point of criticism. The game was followed in October 2008 by Spider-Man: Web of Shadows, which has no connections to the Spider-Man film series. A beat 'em up loosely connected to the films, Spider-Man: Friend or Foe, was published by Activision in October 2007. Following the expiration of Activision's licensing deal with Marvel, Spider-Man 3 was delisted and removed from all digital store fronts on January 4, 2017.

== Gameplay ==
=== PlayStation 3, Xbox 360 and Microsoft Windows ===
A screenshot of Spider-Man in his symbiote black suit, which gives the player extra abilities.

Similarly to Spider-Man 2 and Ultimate Spider-Man, Spider-Man 3 is a third-person action-adventure video game, set in an open world based on Manhattan. Players take on the role of Spider-Man and complete missions—linear scenarios with set objectives—to progress through the story. Missions are structured in a non-linear manner like in the Grand Theft Auto series, meaning that the game features multiple storylines which can be played in any order the player desires. Once the player has completed a number of missions from each storyline, they unlock a main story mission, related to the plot of the film. In addition to the story missions, the game also features side missions, such as races, combat tours and disarming bombs, as well as random attacks in the streets by the city's gangs, which the player can choose to stop. If a number of gang attacks in a specific district are thwarted, then the gang loses control of that district and attacks will no longer occur there. This crime wave mechanic is also influenced by the story missions and combat tours involving each gang.

Players can web swing, crawl walls, and fight enemies using a variety of combos. The game introduces quick-time events and collectibles, which are scattered throughout the city, including the subway (which is now accessible while free roaming). It also features the symbiote black suit, which is automatically unlocked after a number of story missions and introduces a "rage" mechanic, that is charged up by attacking enemies and allows the player to deal extra damage. In this version, the black suit can not be removed after unlocking it, and will be automatically and permanently removed after reaching a certain point in the story.

The game also features an upgrade system where upgrades are unlocked automatically as the player progresses in the story. In the Collectors Edition of the PlayStation 3 version, the New Goblin is a playable character, similarly to the Green Goblin in the first game. The New Goblin is also briefly playable in the final mission of the game across all three platforms, and is available as downloadable content for both PlayStation Network and Xbox Live. He can be selected from the game's menu, much like the player can select from regular Spider-Man and black suited Spider-Man once they completed the story with the former. If choosing to play as black suited Spider-Man, then the game starts from the beginning, but all upgrades are unlocked, therefore this essentially serves as a New Game Plus. If choosing to play as the New Goblin, then none of the story missions are available, but the player can still free roam through the game's map and complete side missions. On PC, the New Goblin is playable only through mods. Peter Parker in his civilian outfit is also playable on PC through mods, and through a glitch that prevents progression in certain story missions across all three platforms.

=== PlayStation 2, Wii and PlayStation Portable ===
This version of the game plays similarly to its next-gen counterpart, except the combat system is mostly ground-based, like in Ultimate Spider-Man. The main narrative is mostly unchanged, except for several slightly altered missions, while most of the secondary storylines focusing on characters not featured in the film have been removed and replaced with new ones. The map has also suffered a few aesthetic changes due to these consoles' limitations. New CGI cutscenes are included, in addition to several recycled scenes from the next-gen version. The most notable change in the gameplay is the ability to change between Spider-Man's traditional red and blue costume and the black suit at any time through a short quick time event (once the latter is unlocked). During the main storyline, the black suit is required to be removed regularly, because if worn for too long, the symbiote will corrupt Spider-Man, leading to a game over. After removing it, there is a cooldown before the black suit can be worn again. After completing the main storyline, the black suit's rage meter will instead deplete to zero percent without killing Spider-Man, once it reaches its limit.

The game features an upgrade system where upgrades need to be manually purchased; there are no upgrades for the black suit. Upgrades are purchased through hero points, similarly to Spider-Man 2, which are unlocked from completing either the main story missions or side missions, including races and combat tours, as well as some that appear randomly across the map. Unlike previous Spider-Man games, these random missions are activated through a radio transmission, allowing the player to accept or decline them, and may vary from stopping muggings to delivering fruit pies. The collectibles and crime wave mechanic from the next-gen version also return, albeit with several modifications. Collectibles, mainly the Spider Emblems, which can be found only during story missions, actually reward the player once found, by unlocking the black suit. The crime wave is now influenced mainly by the combat tours, as there are no longer main story missions involving the gangs. Rather than clearing the city of the gang's influence, the player's goal is to help the NYPD take over, which is depicted as its own "gang", allied to the player, in the menu map.

The primary features for the Wii version are motion controls. By flicking the Wii Remote & Nunchuck, the player can perform various actions such as combat, and one of Spider-Man's trademark abilities, web swinging. There are also certain mini-games tailored to the motion controls. This can range from disarming a bomb, to completing quick time events. The PlayStation Portable version is a full-on port of the PlayStation 2 version with an extra feature exclusive to the version known as "Conquest Mode": an extra mode where the player has to traverse the city and complete challenges such as combat tours, delivering items, and protecting civilians under a time limit. The more challenges are completed, the more hero points the player earns. Once time has elapsed, the score is calculated and the most recent save is loaded; the mission can be replayed any time to get a higher score. Conquest Mode can be exited with a visit to the Daily Bugle building in order to return to the main game. Conquest Mode can be accessed via the title screen or Scrapbook.

=== Nintendo DS and Game Boy Advance ===
The Game Boy Advance version is a level-based 2D side-scrolling beat 'em up; only the characters are rendered in 2.5D. A map is used to enter levels, and each level has question bubbles that give hints. The Nintendo DS version is completely 2.5D and uses the Touch Screen to execute most attacks. Players can put on the black suit at will, but it will be disabled if Spider-Man's health is too low. This version supports wireless multiplayer.

== Synopsis ==
=== Setting ===
Spider-Man 3 is set a year after the events of Spider-Man 2. Since Otto Octavius' sacrifice, New York City has seen no real major threat that Spider-Man has not been able to handle, although recently four new gangs—the H-Bombers, the Apocalypse, the Waste Tribe, and the Dragon Tail—have begun dividing the city between them, engaging in a violent turf war. Peter Parker's personal life is also in turmoil, despite him finally getting to date his childhood crush, Mary Jane Watson, after she became aware of his double life. Peter's former best friend, Harry Osborn, who also learned his secret, despises him because he falsely believes that Spider-Man murdered his father, while his job at the Daily Bugle is threatened by a new rival, Eddie Brock.

=== Plot ===
==== Microsoft Windows, Xbox 360 and PlayStation 3 ====
The game begins with a tutorial level where Spider-Man stops the H-Bombers from blowing up the Carlyle building. The following day, Spider-Man continues to fight crime in Manhattan, and battles each of the four warring gangs, making quick work of the Apocalypse, whose leader is defeated and arrested. That night, while Peter and Mary Jane are discussing their problems in Central Park, an alien symbiote inside a meteor crashes nearby and attaches itself to Peter's shoe. Elsewhere, Harry uses his father's performance-enhancing gas and Green Goblin technology to become the "New Goblin", and an escaped convict named Flint Marko becomes the Sandman after accidentally falling into an experimental particle accelerator that fuses his body with the surrounding sand.

After defeating the Apocalypse gang leader, Spider-Man begins to investigate Arsenic Candy and Dragon Tail's next plot. While investigating the disappearance of his science teacher, Dr. Curt Connors, Peter discovers that he has been conducting experiments on himself with a lizard DNA serum, one of which transformed him into the Lizard. Pursuing the Lizard into the sewers, Spider-Man discovers that he has transformed numerous other people into creatures like himself, intending to have them invade New York. Although Spider-Man manages to foil his plan, the Lizard escapes further into the sewers. Returning to the surface, Peter is attacked by Harry, who seeks to avenge his father's death. Peter defeats Harry, knocking him out in the process, and takes him to the hospital to recover.

The next day, Spider-Man receives help from Detective Jean DeWolfe in dealing with corrupt police, in exchange to help the former to keep update about the H-Bombers' next plans, whose leader, known as "The Mad Bomber", is eventually revealed to be businessman Luke Carlyle, who turned to crime after his company was ruined by a story published by the Daily Bugle. Seeking revenge, Carlyle attacks the Bugle and kidnaps J. Jonah Jameson, but Spider-Man rescues the latter, despite Carlyle's escape. Meanwhile, corrupt science corporation MechaBioCon dispatches their top assassin, Mac Gargan, to break Rhino out of prison, catching Spider-Man's attention. While investigating MechaBioCon, Spider-Man discovers that Gargan turned to them to remove his mechanical scorpion tail so that he could lead a normal life, but they instead experimented on him and placed him under mind control. With the help of a friendly scientist, Dr. Jessica Andrews, who disapproves of the company's experiments on Gargan, Spider-Man finds and frees him from the mind control.

Returning home, Peter is enveloped by the symbiote, creating a black Spider-Man suit that enhances his powers and increases his aggressiveness. After spotting Marko robbing a bank, Spider-Man pursues him into the subway, where they fight. Discovering that water is Marko's weakness, Spider-Man bursts open a pipe, releasing water that reduces Marko to mud and washes him away. The following day, Peter discovers that Eddie Brock hired an impostor Spider-Man to pretend to be committing a robbery so that he could photograph him and earn a promotion. After humiliating Brock as Spider-Man, Peter exposes the scheme and earns the promotion in his place, causing Brock to swear revenge against both Spider-Man and Peter.

Later, Spider-Man finds the Lizard again and manages to restore Connors to his human form, despite Kraven the Hunter and Calypso attempting to hunt the Lizard. He also manages to end the gang war after capturing the leaders of both the Arsenic Candies (real name: Priscilla) and the Dragon Tail, although the Kingpin takes advantage of this to unite the two gangs, as well as the Apocalypse, against Spider-Man. After learning about this, Spider-Man confronts the Kingpin at his penthouse, where he seemingly kills him after tossing him out a window. This, combined with his aggressiveness towards Mary Jane during a date, makes Peter realize that the symbiote is negatively influencing his behavior, and he attempts to remove it at a nearby church. He is successful thanks to the church bell's sonic vibrations, which weaken the symbiote, but the creature bonds with Brock, who followed Spider-Man to the church.

Spider-Man helps Connors atone for his actions as the Lizard by curing the other lizard people, and joins Gargan in infiltrating MechaBioCon to confront the scientist who experimented on him, Farley Stillwell. After defeating Rhino, whom Stillwell hired as her bodyguard, Gargan chooses to spare Stillwell per Spider-Man and Jessica's pleas, and flees, thus secures Stillwell's arrest to the police. Meanwhile, Brock, as Venom, finds a still-living Marko and blackmails him into helping him kill Spider-Man, threatening to murder his daughter. The pair kidnap Mary Jane to lure out Spider-Man, while a recovered Harry comes to his friends' aid. Harry rescues Mary Jane and defeats Marko before Venom kills him by knocking him off his glider and sending him falling to his death. Spider-Man ultimately defeats Venom after using sonic vibrations to weaken him, but Brock dies after being impaled on some steel bars.

Afterward, Spider-Man reconciles with Mary Jane, while Marko is reunited with his daughter, who was rescued by the police. He apologizes to Spider-Man and leaves peacefully. The game ends with Peter resuming his never-ending battle against crime, while stating that the only way to honor and remember those he loves is by never giving up being Spider-Man.

==== PlayStation 2, Wii, PlayStation Portable and Nintendo DS ====
The game begins with a tutorial level where Spider-Man stops the H-Bombers from blowing up the Carlyle building. The next day, Spider-Man investigates several humanoid lizards seen in Central Park, and continues his battle against the H-Bombers, stopping them from blowing up the Daily Bugle's Printing Plant and Regional Office. That night, while Peter and Mary Jane are discussing their problems in Central Park, an alien symbiote inside a meteor crashes nearby and attaches itself to Peter's shoe. After taking Mary Jane home, Peter is attacked by Harry, who became the "New Goblin" to avenge his father's death. Peter defeats Harry, knocking him out in the process, and takes him to the hospital to recover. He then returns home, where he is enveloped by the symbiote, creating a black Spider-Man suit that enhances his powers and increases his aggressiveness. Elsewhere, an escaped convict named Flint Marko becomes the Sandman after accidentally falling into an experimental particle accelerator that fuses his body with the surrounding sand.

The following day, the H-Bombers attack the Daily Bugle and kidnap J. Jonah Jameson, but Spider-Man manages to rescue the latter. He then fights and defeats the Bombers' leader, who is revealed to be businessman Luke Carlyle, who turned to crime after a story published by Jameson ruined his company. Later, Peter investigates the disappearance of his science teacher, Dr. Curt Connors, and discovers that he has been conducting experiments on himself with a lizard DNA serum, one of which transformed him into the Lizard. Chasing the Lizard through the sewers, Spider-Man discovers that he has transformed numerous other people into creatures like himself, intending to have them invade New York. Although Spider-Man manages to foil his plan, the Lizard escapes further into the sewers. When Spider-Man finds him again, the Lizard is fighting Kraven the Hunter, who has been trying to hunt him. Spider-Man intervenes in the confrontation and defeats Kraven, before overpowering the Lizard and restoring Connors to his human form. As Spider-Man cures the remaining victims who were turned into humanoid lizards, Connors helps Spider-Man on investigating the symbiote's dangerous potential after his full recovery from the hospital.

After an assignment from Jameson leads Spider-Man to encounter a vampire, he defeats the creature and brings it to Connors, who recognizes the vampire as a renowned biochemist Dr. Michael Morbius. With Morbius claiming that his wife Shriek was responsible for his transformation, Spider-Man tracks her down and defeats her, but she escapes. After battling Shriek's gang, the Waste Tribe, Spider-Man discovers her whereabouts and brings Morbius to her so that she could cure him. However, she instead turns Morbius against Spider-Man, who defeats him. Shriek then tries to fight Spider-Man herself, but he is able to counter her powers using the symbiote. Defeated, Shriek uses her powers to cure Morbius before falling into a coma. Spider-Man leaves the unconscious Shriek in Morbius' and Connors' care and departs.

Later, Peter discovers that Eddie Brock has been masquerading as a black-suited Spider-Man so that he could 'expose' Spider-Man as a criminal and earn a promotion. After humiliating Brock as Spider-Man, Peter exposes the scheme and earns the promotion in his place, causing Brock to swear revenge against both Spider-Man and Peter. When the public becomes high alert of how lethal Spider-Man progressively become when donning the symbiote suit in his crime fighting career, Spider-Man originally planned to stand down from his prolong use of the suit before spotting Marko robbing an armored van and chases him into the subway, where they fight. Unfortunately, Marko is too strong to be defeated, forcing Spider-Man to don the symbiote suit, then ultimately succumbed to its violent intent and unable to remove it. Discovering that water is Marko's weakness, Spider-Man bursts open a pipe, releasing water that reduces Marko to mud and washes him away. Later that night, the symbiote suit's influence on Peter made Mary Jane fears it during their date and while he fights crime against a group of robbers in front of her. This makes Peter come to his sense to re-learn the symbiote suit's negative influence on his behavior, and go the nearby church to remove it. He is successful thanks to the church bell's sonic vibrations, which weaken the symbiote, but the creature then bonds with Brock, who followed Spider-Man to the church. As Venom, Brock, having deduced that Peter is Spider-Man, finds a still-living Marko and blackmails him into helping him kill Spider-Man, threatening to murder his daughter. The pair kidnap Mary Jane to lure out Spider-Man, while a recovered Harry comes to his friends' aid. Harry rescues Mary Jane and Marko's daughter and helps Spider-Man defeat Marko before Venom kills him by webbing him to one of his bombs and throwing him into Sandman. Spider-Man ultimately defeats Venom after using sonic vibrations to weaken him, but Brock dies after the symbiote leaves his body, the symbiote having drained him of his energy and killing him from exhaustion.

Afterward, Spider-Man reconciles with Mary Jane, while Marko is reunited with his daughter. He apologizes to Spider-Man and leaves peacefully. The game ends with Spider-Man resuming his never-ending battle against crime, while stating that the only way to honor and remember those he loves is by never giving up being Spider-Man.

==== Game Boy Advance ====
While patrolling the city, Spider-Man spots a building on fire, so he goes there and defuses a bomb. He then spots the New Goblin flying around and realizes that he is his friend, Harry Osborn, who believes Spider-Man murdered his father and wants retribution. After Spider-Man defeats Harry, he leaves to rescue more civilians trapped in a building.

Later, Spider-Man encounters the Sandman, but is unable to defeat him, so he returns home, where the alien symbiote spots him, creating a new black suit that enhances his powers. The following day, Spider-Man faces the villains Electro, who has kidnapped a senator, and The Mad Bomber, who has planted explosives throughout the city. After defeating both villains, Spider-Man encounters Sandman again and pursues him, eventually defeating him by violently washing him away down the sewers.

Realizing that the symbiote's influence is starting to corrupt him, Spider-Man removes it using sonic vibrations from the bell of a nearby church. However, the symbiote attaches to Eddie Brock instead, who desires revenge against both Peter Parker and Spider-Man, turning him into Venom. Spider-Man is later attacked by Venom and a still-living Sandman, who has since gained quicksand powers. After defeating Sandman, Spider-Man and Venom engage in a final battle, until Venom falls off the building and seemingly dies. Spider-Man proceeds to call for an ambulance, as the symbiote leaves Eddie's body and slithers away into the night. The game ends on a cliffhanger with a screenshot reading "The End?"

== Special editions ==
Special editions of the game were available to PS2 and PS3 owners. The PlayStation 3 Collector's Edition artwork shows the fully colored Black Suit of Spider-Man instead of a hybrid of both suits. Common features for the PS2 and PS3 were an interview with Avi Arad, chief creative officer of Marvel Entertainment and founder of Marvel Studios, Spider-Man 3 movie webisodes, a behind the scenes featurette with the cast, and a collectable lenticular card with the movie's images. The PS3 Collector's Edition came with a pre-installed DLC that featured the ability to play as the New Goblin (who becomes available only after defeating him in the game). The New Goblin DLC was later made available for download from PlayStation Network and Xbox Live users on July 12, 2007.

== Reception ==
Spider-Man 3 received "generally positive" reviews for the DS version but "mixed or average" reviews for all other platforms, according to review aggregator Metacritic.

Reception

Aggregate score
Aggregator	Score							
Aggregator	DS	GBA	PC	PS2	PS3	PSP	Wii	Xbox 360
Metacritic	79/100	68/100	62/100	50/100	60/100	52/100	53/100	63/100

Review scores
Publication	Score							
Publication	DS	GBA	PC	PS2	PS3	PSP	Wii	Xbox 360
1Up.com	N/A	N/A	N/A	N/A	5/10	N/A	3.5/10	5/10
4Players	N/A	N/A	77%	59%	N/A	N/A	60%	79%
Edge	N/A	N/A	N/A	N/A	N/A	N/A	N/A	3/10
Electronic Gaming Monthly	N/A	N/A	N/A	N/A	6.33/10	N/A	N/A	6.33/10
Eurogamer	N/A	N/A	N/A	N/A	N/A	N/A	N/A	6/10
Game Informer	N/A	N/A	N/A	N/A	8/10	N/A	6.5/10	8/10
GamePro	N/A	N/A	N/A	N/A	4.25/5	N/A	3/5	4.25/5
GameRevolution	N/A	N/A	N/A	N/A	D+	N/A	C	D+
GamesMaster	N/A	N/A	N/A	N/A	N/A	N/A	4/10	8.5/10
GameSpot	8/10	6.9/10	6.3/10	4.7/10	6.6/10	N/A	4.7/10	6.6/10
GameSpy	4.5/5	N/A	N/A	2.5/5	3/5	N/A	2.5/5	3/5
GamesRadar+	N/A	N/A	N/A	2/5	N/A	N/A	2/5	N/A
GameTrailers	N/A	N/A	N/A	N/A	6.7/10	N/A	N/A	6.7/10
GameZone	8.6/10	8/10	6.8/10	4/10	8.3/10	N/A	8/10	8/10
IGN	8.1/10	N/A	5.7/10	3.5/10	6/10	4.7/10	5.7/10	6.45/10
Jeuxvideo.com	N/A	N/A	N/A	10/20	N/A	N/A	10/20	N/A
Nintendo Power	7/10	N/A	N/A	N/A	N/A	N/A	6/10	N/A
Nintendo World Report	8/10	N/A	N/A	N/A	N/A	N/A	6/10	N/A
Official Nintendo Magazine	N/A	N/A	N/A	N/A	N/A	N/A	4.1/10	N/A
PlayStation Official Magazine – UK	N/A	N/A	N/A	3/10	3/10	5/10	N/A	N/A
Official U.S. PlayStation Magazine	N/A	N/A	N/A	N/A	5/10	N/A	N/A	N/A
Official Xbox Magazine (UK)	N/A	N/A	N/A	N/A	N/A	N/A	N/A	5/10
Official Xbox Magazine (US)	N/A	N/A	N/A	N/A	N/A	N/A	N/A	6.5/10
PALGN	N/A	N/A	N/A	N/A	N/A	N/A	N/A	50/100
PC Gamer (US)	N/A	N/A	52%	N/A	N/A	N/A	N/A	N/A
Play	N/A	N/A	N/A	N/A	3.3/10	3.2/10	N/A	8/10
Pocket Gamer	4/5	N/A	N/A	N/A	N/A	N/A	N/A	N/A
TeamXbox	N/A	N/A	N/A	N/A	N/A	N/A	N/A	55/100
VideoGamer.com	7/10	N/A	N/A	N/A	N/A	N/A	4/10	7/10
The A.V. Club	N/A	N/A	N/A	N/A	N/A	N/A	C−	N/A
The Sydney Morning Herald	N/A	N/A	N/A	N/A	2.5/5	N/A	N/A	2.5/5

The PlayStation 2, Wii, and PlayStation Portable versions have been criticized for a short story mode and disappointing graphics, with GamesRadar suggesting that they were technically inferior to the preceding game from 2004. The Wii version has however been praised for the use of the Remote and Nunchuk in its gameplay, which is considered to be the Wii version's strongest point. The Microsoft Windows, Xbox 360, and PlayStation 3 versions, despite receiving only average reviews, have been universally better received than the PlayStation 2, Wii, and PlayStation Portable versions. The Wii version was given a "D+" grade by The Wire. X-Play gave the Wii version 1 out of 5 (the first Wii game to get 1 out of 5), the Xbox 360 and PlayStation 3 versions 3 out of 5, and the DS version 4 out of 5.

The game was also criticized for not being the same version on each system. Some criticism has surfaced due to having New Goblin only fully playable in the Xbox 360 and PlayStation 3. It was also criticized for having a lot of glitches. However, Game Informer liked the Xbox 360 and PlayStation 3 versions of game, giving them an eight out of ten. For the Nintendo DS version, GameSpot praised the number of moves, Tobey Maguire's voice acting, and the variety of missions, but criticized the soundtrack.

The game shipped more than 4 million copies.

== Cancelled sequel ==
On April 22, 2009, Variety reported that Radical Entertainment was working on a Spider-Man game. More details regarding this project would be revealed in June 2019, when a senior environment artist who worked at Radical Entertainment, Wayne Dalton, posted several screenshots taken from the game, and revealed that it would have been a Spider-Man 4 game, based on the cancelled film of the same name. According to Dalton, after the project's cancellation, it was reworked into Prototype 2.

Eurocom handled the development of the Wii version. On December 2019, an early prototype of the Wii version was found on a Wii development kit, which was recovered by gaming preservation site GamingAlexandria, and showcased by YouTube channel Hard4Games. In September 2021, early gameplay footage of the Xbox 360 version was revealed to the public by gaming preservation site Prototopia, formerly known as Obscure Gamers, which showed Spider-Man web-swinging through Manhattan and fighting an enemy gunship and several thugs.
