= Mary Jane Watson (2002 film series character) =

2002-2007 Spider-Man film series character

- Sam Raimi's Spider-Man and Marvel Cinematic Universe character
- Kirsten Dunst as Mary Jane Watson in Spider-Man (2002)
- First appearance: Spider-Man (2002)
- Last appearance: Spider-Man 3 (2007)
- Based on: Mary Jane Watson by: Stan Lee; John Romita Sr.
- Adapted by: David Koepp
- Portrayed by: Kirsten Dunst
- Voiced by: Lisa Loeb (Spider-Man: The New Animated Series); Cat O' Conner (first film game); Kirsten Dunst (second film game); Kari Wahlgren (third film game)

In-universe information
- Full name: Mary Jane Watson
- Nickname: MJ
- Occupation: Broadway actress; Model; Jazz club singer; Waitress; High school student
- Family: Phillip Watson (father); Madeline Watson (mother)
- Significant others: Peter Parker (boyfriend); Flash Thompson (ex-boyfriend); Harry Osborn (ex-boyfriend); John Jameson (ex-fiancée)
- Origin: Queens, New York City, U.S.

Mary Jane Watson is a fictional character in Sam Raimi's Spider-Man film series. She is based on the comic book character Mary Jane Watson and is portrayed in the film series by Kirsten Dunst. In the films, Mary Jane is Peter Parker's next-door neighbor, childhood crush and primary love interest. Though she truly only loves Peter, Mary Jane dates other men throughout the trilogy due to his absence. Despite his strong feelings for her, Peter initially declines a relationship with her in order to keep her safe, but in Spider-Man 2 (2004) after Mary Jane discovers that Peter is Spider-Man, she enters a relationship with him despite the risks to her safety.

Despite criticism of her character for adhering to the damsel in distress archetype during the trilogy, Dunst's interpretation of the character has been generally well-received.

== Character design and portrayal ==
=== Comic book origins ===
Mary Jane Watson was first introduced into Spider-Man comics story-lines in The Amazing Spider-Man #42 in 1966, despite being mentioned earlier in the comics. She was conceived as competition to Gwen Stacy as Spider-Man's primary love interest, and is characterized as a free-spirited, outgoing personality as opposed to Gwen's more serious, academic nature. Peter Parker initially dates Gwen after he stops going out with Mary Jane due to what he sees as her shallow personality while Mary Jane refuses to be tied down in one relationship. Despite this, Mary Jane became more popular with fans and following Gwen's death in the comics, Peter and Mary Jane begin to rekindle their relationship and eventually marry despite ups and downs in the comics.

=== Casting and execution ===
Actress Kirsten Dunst was cast as Mary Jane for the 2002 Spider-Man film, with Mary Jane having been cemented in comics lore as Peter's primary love interest by then. Before director Sam Raimi cast Dunst, he had expressed his interest in casting Alicia Witt. Dunst decided to audition after learning Tobey Maguire had been cast as Peter Parker/Spider-Man, feeling the film would have a more independent feel. Dunst earned the role a month before shooting in an audition in Berlin. In the first two films in the trilogy, Dunst wore a red wig for the part, dying part of her hair in the first film, before dying her full head of blond hair red for the third film. Dunst was also allegedly asked to change her teeth for the films, a demand that she refused. She also declined to do certain stunts in the films.

The set-up for Spider-Man and Mary Jane's famous "upside-down kiss" involved several rain-machines at the studio lot, and saw some difficulty as Maguire was hung upside down with water pouring into his nostrils. To achieve the look of Mary Jane pulling Spider-Man's mask down, Dunst was described by Sam Raimi as "doing some hand trickery" as the mask was not pliable in those conditions.

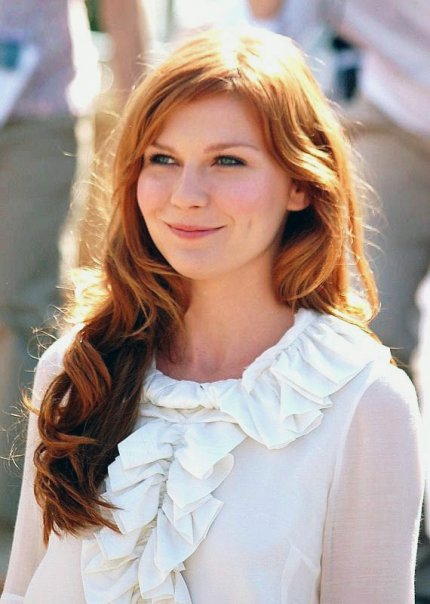
Kirsten Dunst in 2006. For the first and second films, she wore a red wig to play Mary Jane; for the third film, she dyed her blonde hair red.

Having initially signed on for three Spider-Man films, Dunst said that she would consider doing a fourth, but only if Raimi and Maguire also returned. In January 2010, it was announced that the fourth film was cancelled and that the Spider-Man film series would be restarted, and therefore dropping the trio from the franchise. Storyboard artist Jeffrey Henderson, who worked on the fourth Spider-Man film before the project's cancellation, disclosed in November 2022 that the fourth film would have depicted Mary Jane being "let go" by Peter to enable him to focus on being Spider-Man.

In 2021, while attending a screening of her film The Power of the Dog, Dunst expressed openness to reprising her role as Mary Jane in regards to rumors of her appearance in the Marvel Cinematic Universe (MCU) film Spider-Man: No Way Home: "I would do it. Why not? That would be fun. I would never say no to something like that". No Way Home screenwriters Erik Sommers and Chris McKenna wrote at various points versions of the film's story that included Mary Jane, alongside appearances of Sally Field's Aunt May and Emma Stone's Gwen Stacy, but Sommers and McKenna ultimately concluded that the story felt already overstuffed, ultimately choosing Zendaya's Michelle "MJ" Jones and Marisa Tomei's Aunt May to be the only female characters in the film with significant screen time.

=== Characterization and themes ===
As portrayed in the Sam Raimi trilogy, Mary Jane is a cheerful, passionate and energetic young woman who is an aspiring actress. She runs with the stereotypical popular crowd in school. Mary Jane is somewhat naive, but always knows what's going on. She is a loyal friend and a warm individual, capable of intense love and real feelings. Despite her popularity, Mary Jane struggles with insecurity and an urge to impress people she deems important. She also deals with the harsh reality of being an actress and has her own struggles in each film.

She never bullies or judges Peter and is friendly towards him, despite him being in the unpopular crowd, and even flirts with him and calls him "Tiger" (an homage to her catchphrase in the comics). She generally has no one treat her with respect for anything other than her looks, which she may not have noticed until after high school graduation, before she and Peter develop a stronger friendship. It is quite possibly because of this that Mary Jane becomes smitten by Spider-Man so quickly and later falls for Peter (oblivious that they are one and the same) as he is very kind to her other than just for her looks. After her kiss with Spider-Man, Mary Jane is shown to be a great deal happier and almost ecstatic, because it had perhaps been her first kiss with someone who loved her back for more than just aesthetic reasons. Unfortunately, her involvement with Spider-Man also makes her a common target by his enemies, making her require his rescue in all three films, as noted by Emily Kubincanek of Film School Rejects.

Writing in 2020 after the release of Spider-Man: Into the Spider-Verse, Adadora Asidianya of CBR.com looked back at Mary Jane's live-action portrayal in the Raimi films and noted that she provides a grounding presence for Peter in the films, also commending her positive outlook in life despite her toxic upbringings.

== Appearances ==
=== Spider-Man (2002) ===
Mary Jane first appears as Peter Parker narrates the first few minutes of the film. She is depicted as a popular girl at Midtown High School and the girlfriend of star athlete Flash Thompson, while Peter, her next-door neighbor who has had a crush on her since they were in first grade, is an academically gifted but shy outsider. Peter struggles to catch the school bus until Mary Jane asks the driver to stop for him. Later, their class attends a field trip to a lab at Columbia University. Peter's friend Harry Osborn flirts with Mary Jane before Peter takes a picture of her for the school newspaper, after which a genetically-altered spider bites him, giving him his abilities. Peter then saves her from slipping in the school cafeteria with his new abilities the next day and inadvertently triggers a fight with Flash. When Peter later apologizes to her for the fight, she confides in him about wanting to escape her abusive, alcoholic father and pursue an acting career.

Mary Jane breaks up with Flash during high school graduation and takes up work as a waitress while looking for acting gigs. While she starts dating Harry, she and Peter begin to form a closer friendship. Peter rescues her as Spider-Man when the Green Goblin attacks a parade she was attending with Harry, and again later on from a gang in an alley. She thanks Spider-Man with a kiss without him revealing his identity. Mary Jane grows distant from Harry due to his desire to please his father, Norman, at her expense and also subsequently develops feelings for Peter when she realizes how much he cares for her, causing Harry to break up with Mary Jane upon seeing her and Peter holding hands.

Norman, who is the Green Goblin and has deduced Peter is Spider-Man, kidnaps Mary Jane upon realizing Peter loves her, thanks to his son's unwitting confession, and holds her hostage atop Queensboro Bridge. Spider-Man saves her and a Roosevelt Island Tramway car full of children and defeats the Green Goblin in a final battle, with the Goblin ultimately dying after accidentally impaling himself with his own glider. At Norman's funeral, Mary Jane tells Peter that she loves him and they kiss. Peter, who decides that for her protection they can't be together, gently rejects her and insists they can only be friends. As he leaves, a saddened Mary Jane realizes that her kiss with Peter reminds her of the one she shared with Spider-Man and suspects that they are the same person.

=== Spider-Man 2 (2004) ===
Two years after the events of the first movie, Mary Jane has found success as a model and Off-Broadway actress. Maintaining her friendships with both Peter and Harry, she reveals she is dating astronaut John Jameson, the son of Peter's boss J. Jonah Jameson. Struggling to balance his vigilantism as Spider-Man with his personal life, Peter fails to make it to one of Mary Jane's performances of The Importance of Being Earnest. Furious, she refuses to speak to him and she and John get engaged, much to Peter's chagrin.

After renouncing his identity as Spider-Man, Peter is able to pursue Mary Jane. After Mary Jane kisses John in a manner that is reminiscent of the upside-down kiss between her and Spider-Man from the first film, she realizes that she does not love him and still wants a relationship with Peter. Later, she meets Peter in a coffee shop where she asks him if he loves her; Peter once again lies claiming that he does not reciprocate. She then asks for a kiss to confirm her belief that he is Spider-Man, but before they can do so, Doctor Octopus attacks the cafe, kidnapping her.

Harry, who had made a deal with Doc Ock to exact revenge on Spider-Man (whom he falsely believes killed his father) reluctantly provides Doc Ock and Mary Jane's location so Peter can save her. Peter defeats Doctor Octopus and reveals his identity to both Doc Ock and Mary Jane, confirming her suspicions that Peter and Spider-Man are in fact one and the same. Peter finally confesses his love for her, rescuing her as Doctor Octopus regains control of himself from the malicious AI in his tentacles and repents for his prior actions, sacrificing himself to destroy the reactor. Peter explains his reasoning for not being with her, then returns her to John. However, Mary Jane leaves John at the altar during their wedding and runs to Peter's apartment, stating that she is willing to accept any risks that come with being in a relationship with Peter. The two kiss passionately, and Mary Jane sees Peter off as he swings into action as Spider-Man, saying "Go get 'em, Tiger.”

=== Spider-Man 3 (2007) ===
Having dated Peter for one year, Mary Jane experiences some struggles in her personal life, losing her Broadway role due to bad critical reception and experiencing friction with Peter when an alien symbiote possesses him and amplifies the negative traits of his personality. The two become distanced as Peter focuses on capturing and killing his uncle's actual killer, Flint Marko. She also faces competition for Peter's affections in the form of his lab partner Gwen Stacy. After she confides in Harry about her problems, Harry, who had suffered amnesia from a prior fight with Peter as the New Goblin, regains his memories after they unwittingly kiss and forces Mary Jane into breaking up with Peter, setting up a second confrontation between the two former friends which leaves Harry's face disfigured.

Peter, now under further influence from the symbiote, brings Gwen to a jazz club where Mary Jane has found work as a singing waitress to make the latter jealous, though Gwen catches on and apologizes to Mary Jane. Peter then brawls with the club's bouncers and unintentionally hits Mary Jane when she intervenes, finally alerting him as to what the symbiote has turned him into. He leaves and disposes of the symbiote at a nearby church, which subsequently possesses Eddie Brock, Gwen's failed suitor and Peter's bitter photography rival, creating Venom.

As she leaves her apartment, Mary Jane is kidnapped by Venom, who has teamed up with Flint Marko to kill Spider-Man. The former suspends her in a web duct taxi as bait. She manages to save Spider-Man in the nick of time by dropping a cinder block onto Venom. The subsequent battle pits Spider-Man and Harry (as the New Goblin) against Venom and Sandman; the villains are defeated, but Harry loses his life after sacrificing himself to save Peter, dying with him and Mary Jane at his side.

Sometime after Harry's funeral, Peter arrives at Mary Jane's jazz club, and the two begin to mend their relationship, sharing a dance. (Note: After Peter is temporarily transported to an alternate reality during the events of the Marvel Studios film Spider-Man: No Way Home, he reveals his relationship with Mary Jane remains "complicated" before adding the two worked it out "after a long time".)

== In other media ==
=== Television ===
- Mary Jane also appears in Spider-Man: The New Animated Series, an animated television series serving as a loose alternate continuation of the first Spider-Man film. She, Peter and Harry attend Empire State University together, and she attempts to start a relationship with Peter without much success, owing to his reluctance to endanger her due to his duties as Spider-Man. Mary Jane Watson is voiced by Lisa Loeb.

=== Film ===
- Dunst's Mary Jane appears through archive material from Spider-Man in the Into the Spider-Verse sequel Spider-Man: Across the Spider-Verse (2023).

=== Video games ===
- Mary Jane appears in all three video game adaptations of the films. While she is voiced by Cat O'Conner in the first game, Kirsten Dunst reprises her role in a vocal capacity in the second game while Kari Wahlgren takes over the role in the third game.

== Reception and legacy ==
Kirsten Dunst was nominated for several awards for her performance, winning four, including the Empire Award for Best Actress in 2003. Owen Gleiberman of Entertainment Weekly remarked on Dunst's ability to "lend even the smallest line a tickle of flirtatious music". In the Los Angeles Times review, critic Kenneth Turan noted that Dunst and Maguire made a real connection on screen, concluding that their relationship "involved audiences to an extent rarely seen in films".

However, in his review of Spider-Man 3, Ryan Gilbey of the NewStatesman was critical of Dunst's character: "the film-makers couldn't come up with much for Mary Jane to do other than scream a lot". Allie Gemmill of Bustle wrote in 2017 that the films portray Mary Jane as a constant damsel in distress and gave the illusion that she was defined primarily through the men in her life. Miquel Navas criticized her as a damsel in distress but praised how she had become iconic.

Conversely, Adadora Asidianya wrote that Mary Jane provides a voice of reason for Peter, whether as a friend or a love interest. Medium.com writer Coffee House wrote positively of Mary Jane, calling her "magnificent. A modern take on the classic character without diverging too far from the original canon. Not a pushover, not a stubborn ass. A strong willed yet caring, beautiful yet intelligent...young woman, with a character arc of her own, independent of our male protagonist." David Miller of Screen Rant called her the best of Spider-Man's love interests, praising her character development and feeling she was accurate to her comic book counterpart, not minding her being written as a damsel in distress.

Spider-Man and Mary Jane's "upside-down kiss" in Spider-Man is now regarded as one of the most iconic moments in film history. Entertainment Weekly put "the kiss in Spider-Man" on its end-of-the-decade "best-of" list, saying: "There's a fine line between romantic and corny. And the rain-soaked smooch between Spider-Man and Mary Jane from 2002 tap-dances right on that line. The reason it works? Even if she suspects he's Peter Parker, she doesn't try to find out. And that's sexy."
