= Harry Osborn (2002 film series character) =

2002-2007 Spider-Man film series character

- Sam Raimi's Spider-Man and Marvel Cinematic Universe character
- Harry Osborn, as portrayed by James Franco in Spider-Man 2 (2004)
- First appearance: Spider-Man (2002)
- Last appearance: Spider-Man 3 (2007)
- Based on: Harry Osborn by: Stan Lee; Steve Ditko
- Adapted by: David Koepp
- Portrayed by: James Franco
- Voiced by: Ian Ziering (Spider-Man: The New Animated Series); Josh Keaton (first and second film games, Spider-Man: Friend or Foe); James Franco (third film game)

In-universe information
- Full name: Harold Theopolis Osborn
- Species: Human, later human mutate
- Occupation: Student; Financier; Head of Oscorp
- Weapon: Goblin technology; Pumpkin bombs; Bladed suit and glider; Powered sword
- Family: Norman Osborn (father); Unnamed mother Unnamed younger brother
- Significant others: Mary Jane Watson (ex-girlfriend); Unnamed girlfriend
- Origin: New York City, U.S.

Harold Theopolis "Harry" Osborn is a fictional character in Sam Raimi's Spider-Man film series. Based on the comic book character of the same name created by Stan Lee and Steve Ditko, he is portrayed by James Franco. In the films, Harry is Peter Parker's best friend and a rival for Mary Jane Watson's affections, though the three are friends for much of the series. Harry and Peter's friendship strains severely after the death of Harry's father Norman, who was the villainous Green Goblin, which he blames on Peter's alter-ego Spider-Man on top of resentment towards Peter for seemingly "snatching" Mary Jane's affections from him. After discovering his best friend is the web-slinger, Harry, despite reluctance at first, vows revenge on him, taking on the New Goblin (Note: He is never referred to as such in Spider-Man 3 aside from the credits and promotional materials, and was referred to on the set of the film as the Hobgoblin.) mantle and utilizing the technology his father left behind.

Despite receiving mixed reviews in the first two installments, Franco's portrayal of Harry Osborn brought him to wider mainstream exposure, as one of his first major film roles. He was nominated for four awards for his more warmly received performance in Spider-Man 3 (2007).

== Character design and portrayal ==
=== Comics origin and casting for Sam Raimi's films ===
First appearing in The Amazing Spider-Man #31, Harry Osborn is depicted as the wealthy son of Norman Osborn, with his mother presumably dying at a young age. Harry and Peter Parker gradually become close friends after meeting in college, despite initially not getting along and battling over girls such as Gwen Stacy and Mary Jane Watson. Harry struggles to gain his father's approval, who is constantly at work, and becomes jealous of Norman becoming fond of Peter. After Mary Jane dumps him, he becomes addicted to drugs. He initially does not know his father becomes the Green Goblin while his best friend is actually Spider-Man. Harry takes on the Green Goblin persona and technology after his father's death, which he blames on Spider-Man and in turn Peter, and is influenced by hallucinations of his father to kill Peter, but sacrifices himself to save Peter, Mary Jane, and his son. Since dying in The Spectacular Spider-Man #200, Harry, like his father and Gwen Stacy, has since been resurrected or re-adapted into different forms in the comics.

James Franco was cast as Harry for the 2002 Spider-Man film. Originally, Franco was considered for the lead role of Spider-Man/Peter Parker in the film before Tobey Maguire won the role, but upon seeing Franco's audition, Raimi's wife thought that Franco was perfect for the role of Harry. In a review of the first film, Todd McCarthy of Variety noted that there were "good moments" between Maguire and Franco. However, due to an off-hand remark that Franco made towards Maguire, a real-life feud emerged between the two actors for some time.

In Spider-Man 3, shooting was difficult for cinematographer Bill Pope during fight scenes that take place at night, as the symbiote Spider-Man, Venom, and the New Goblin were all costumed in black for those scenes. Upon Harry taking on his father's mantle and using leftover equipment, Harry's suit and glider have been modified, possibly due to the backlash that the original Green Goblin suit received in the first film. Instead of using a bulky helmet, the New Goblin uses a mask resembling a ski mask with goggles, and his glider, nicknamed the Sky Stick in the film's promotional materials, resembles a snowboard.

=== Characterization and themes ===
As depicted in the Sam Raimi film series, Harry is a good man and a loyal friend, having always considered the nerdy Peter Parker his best friend and protected him in high school, which closely resembles their relationship in the Ultimate Spider-Man comics. In addition, he never allowed his wealth to make him spoiled or arrogant early in the series. However, Harry is also prone to stress, depression and obsession, and his desire to please his father strains his judgement and relationships, including treating his then-girlfriend Mary Jane Watson as a trophy to impress his father, and developing a jealousy towards his best friend, Peter. After his father's death, Harry becomes obsessed with Spider-Man, and develops a strong vendetta towards him. The "New Goblin" persona adopted in Spider-Man 3 is the embodiment of Harry Osborn's hatred towards Spider-Man and only exists for completing his vendetta. But after Harry comes to terms with his misguided hatred and his friendship with Peter, with no more doubts, he reconciles with his best friend and the two form an effective team fighting against adversaries.

In an analysis of the leading male figures in Spider-Man, including Tobey Maguire's Peter Parker and Willem Dafoe's Norman Osborn, James Whitbroook of Gizmodo writes that Harry is initially reluctant to bask in the Osborn name, hiding from public view while riding with his father in their limousine and resisting the urge to become spoiled by his inheritance, though he almost immediately takes advantage of Peter's bookish nature to flirt with Mary Jane, his best friend's crush, using a trivia bit that Peter brings up to impress her. Harry eventually gives in to using the Osborn name due to what it brings to him, eventually gambling on an ill-fated experiment by Dr. Otto Octavius in Spider-Man 2 in an attempt to gain more power and influence rather than to benefit those around him. Harry is under the impression that his father was a good man killed by Spider-Man, and upon discovering his father's stash of weaponry, uses it to try and get revenge on the hero, even after he discovers that Peter, his best friend, is actually Spider-Man. Sam Raimi felt that Harry would not follow his father's legacy upon becoming the new Green Goblin, but be instead "somewhere between." Despite this, Raimi wanted the conflict between Harry and Peter to be resolved by the end of Spider-Man 3. He also said that him suffering from amnesia in the first act was a way to rekindle Harry's broken friendship with Peter.

== Appearances ==
=== Spider-Man (2002) ===
Harry first appears riding with his father Norman Osborn in their limousine as Norman drops Harry off for a school field trip. The film establishes that Harry had flunked out of numerous private schools, forcing his enrollment at Midtown High School, and that Harry and Norman have a somewhat strained relationship. Upon seeing his best friend Peter Parker, Harry introduces him to his father, who immediately takes a liking to Peter, due to his intellect, to which Harry jokes that Norman wants to adopt him. Norman later attends their graduation and congratulates Harry, also taking time to console Peter for the loss of his uncle and warmly accepting him as a brother figure to Harry and thus a part of their family. At the same time, Harry notices that Mary Jane Watson, Peter's childhood crush, had broken up with her ex-boyfriend Flash Thompson.

Some time after the end of school, Harry and Peter live together in a large apartment bought by Norman. Harry starts a relationship with Mary Jane, initially without telling Peter, who later finds out from Mary Jane that the two are dating but hides his disappointment. Harry and Mary Jane have an important date at a fair sponsored by his father's company Oscorp, where the flaws of their relationship are shown: Harry wants to impress his father with Mary Jane, and Mary Jane is evidently not truly interested in him. The couple, along with the whole Oscorp board, are suddenly attacked by the Green Goblin, a homicidal criminal who, unbeknownst to Harry, is actually Norman with an insane second personality due to an experiment gone wrong. Harry attempts to save MJ from falling down from a terrace, but is knocked out by falling debris, and she is instead saved by Spider-Man.

On Thanksgiving, Harry tries again to present his girlfriend to his father during dinner with Peter and his Aunt May, but Norman, who discovers that Peter is Spider-Man, suddenly leaves in a hurry. Harry pleads with him to stay for dinner with him and Mary Jane, but Norman uncharacteristically insults Mary Jane, ordering his son to dump her as soon as he is satisfied with her, and then storms off. Harry is saddened by the lack of attention by his father, and, to make it worse, Mary Jane overhears Norman and calls him a creep, and an angry Harry defends him, saying that the "creep" was his father.

While Aunt May is in the hospital after being attacked by the Goblin, Harry goes to visit her, but finds Peter and Mary Jane getting intimate with each other. With his feelings hurt, Harry goes to his father, telling him he was right about everything, MJ included, and unwittingly reveals to the Goblin Spider-Man's true weakness: Mary Jane. The Green Goblin uses this to bait Spider-Man into another fight by kidnapping Mary Jane, but is killed by his own glider after attempting to kill Spider-Man. Following Norman's last wish to not let Harry know about his villainous split-personality, Spider-Man removes the Goblin's costume and returns Norman's body to the Osborn mansion, but Harry walks in. Distraught and mistakenly assuming it was Spider-Man who killed Norman, Harry tries to shoot the hero, but Spider-Man vanishes.

During Norman's funeral, Harry swears vengeance towards Spider-Man, but expresses his gratitude that Peter is the only family he has left.

=== Spider-Man 2 (2004) ===
Two years after Norman's death, Harry takes over Oscorp. He remains good friends with Peter but still harbors animosity towards Spider-Man, and at Peter's birthday party, offers to introduce Peter to his idol, renowned scientist, Dr. Otto Octavius, whose research Harry is funding. Peter is, however, still fearful of how delicate his friendship with Harry has become because of Harry's vendetta against his alter-ego.

Harry provides Octavius with tritium, a very rare form of hydrogen which Octavius needs for his nuclear fusion experiment. If the experiment succeeds, Oscorp would gain the rights on a new kind of energy source, making it one of the most important, powerful and rich energy companies in the world. However, during a live demonstration of the fusion, the experiment fails and despite Harry's warnings Otto refuses to shut down the machine and the resulting explosion permanently attaches four extendable robotic arms onto Octavius, who is taken to the hospital and later escapes, becoming the villainous "Doctor Octopus". Emotionally destroyed by the failure, Harry starts drinking heavily and focuses his anger onto Spider-Man. During a party, Harry gets drunk and starts lashing out at Peter, resenting him for being his father's favorite, accusing him of protecting Spider-Man for the profit of taking Spider-Man's newspaper photos and for "stealing" Mary Jane. During the argument, Harry slaps Peter, humiliating them both in public.

His hatred towards Spider-Man goes so far that, when Doctor Octopus arrives at his penthouse demanding more tritium, he makes a deal with him: the tritium in exchange of Spider-Man's capture. When Doc Ock asks him how can he find the hero, Harry instructs him to use Peter Parker, who takes pictures of Spider-Man. After kidnapping Mary Jane and a long battle, Octavius delivers Spider-Man to Harry and leaves with his tritium. Armed with a dagger, Harry then proceeds to unmask the hero. He is shocked when he realizes that his worst enemy was actually his best friend, but he reveals Doc Ock's whereabouts to Peter, who leaves to rescue Mary Jane.

Still in shock, Harry sees visions of his father's ghost, who encourages his revenge towards Peter Parker/Spider-Man. Harry is reluctant to hurt his friend and struggles against Norman's will, trying to make the ghost go away; throwing a knife through the mirror in which Norman appears, Harry shatters it and discovers the Green Goblin's secret hideout, with all his weaponry and equipment. Now, Harry has both the motives and the tools for his revenge. (Note: While Harry is implied but never outright stated not to know that Norman Osborn was the Green Goblin in Spider-Man 2 (2004), the Marvel Cinematic Universe (MCU) film Spider-Man: No Way Home (2021) establishes that Norman's identity as the Goblin was made public knowledge (and known to Harry) upon his original death in Spider-Man (2002), with Otto Octavius and Flint Marko already being aware of his identity by the events of Spider-Man 2 and after the events of Spider-Man 3 (2007), respectively. Marko informs an alternate-universe Peter Parker about how both Osborn and Octavius should be dead; Harry's consequent actions in Spider-Man 2 and Spider-Man 3 are then presented as denial over his father's true motivations as the Goblin combined with an honor-driven vendetta over the mistaken belief that Spider-Man had killed him.) Harry is later seen at Mary Jane and John Jameson's botched wedding as a guest.

=== Spider-Man 3 (2007) ===
Harry in action as the "New Goblin" as seen in Spider-Man 3.

Following a year, Harry brushes off Peter's attempts to talk to him and explain the truth of Norman's death. He eventually opts to use a refined version of his father's performance-enhancing formula, utilizing his father's equipment as well. After Peter leaves a date with Mary Jane, Harry ambushes him as the New Goblin, intent on exacting revenge for his father's death. During their confrontation, Peter tells Harry the truth that he did not kill Norman Osborn and that Norman died due to his own doing while he tried to kill Peter, but Harry refuses to believe it. Battling in an alley, Peter entraps Harry and knocks him out, impairing part of his memory. Recovering in the hospital, Harry—vaguely suffering from amnesia—forgets everything about his vendetta and Spider-Man. He also re-embraces Peter and Mary Jane as his best friends, seemingly with his life finally at peace. Harry, having forgotten taking the Goblin Serum, is surprised by his enhanced physical capacities, such as his incredibly sharp reflexes. However, despite Harry's relief, Peter does not tell him about the true nature of Norman's demise.

When Peter is overtaken by an alien symbiote which affects his personality and thus starts distancing himself from his friends to focus on his late uncle's recently revealed killer, Mary Jane is depressed over her lost acting career and finds solace with Harry. Harry welcomes her into his home and they bond with each other, seemingly becoming closer than their previous dating relationship. After she unwittingly kisses him and rushes away regretting it, the sudden surge of familiar stress unlocks Harry's memories and restores his vendetta. Again haunted by visions of his father, who gives him advice on emotional war, Harry decides to hurt Peter through Mary Jane by forcing her to break up with Peter, leaving Peter heartbroken. Later, Harry encounters Peter in a café and declares to him that he is Mary Jane's new boyfriend. Realizing Harry's plot against him, Peter goes to the Osborn mansion, now armed with the aggression-inducing symbiote costume, and a new hatred for his old best friend, engaging Harry in a brutal fist-fight. Harry is defeated and insulted by Peter, who spitefully mocks his relationship with his father, and when he tries to hit Peter with a pumpkin bomb, Peter effortlessly slings the bomb back at his face and leaves, turning his back on the completely defeated Harry.

After Peter realizes the symbiote's effects on him and his relationships, he gets rid of the suit, only for it to fall onto his rival at the Daily Bugle, Eddie Brock, and create a new enemy, Venom. Peter pleads with Harry for help when Venom and Sandman kidnap Mary Jane, but a broken-spirited Harry, whose face is disfigured at the right half from the bomb, refuses and Peter leaves. As Spider-Man takes on the two villains alone, Harry's butler reveals to him that while cleaning Norman's corpse, he discovered that Norman's death was a result of his own weaponry and not due to Spider-Man, but kept it a secret all these years; realizing Peter's story is true and feels remorseful for blaming Peter for his father's death. As Sandman and Venom pin Peter down and try to kill Peter, Harry intervenes just in time. Harry and Peter prove to be a formidable team and defeat Sandman in addition to saving Mary Jane. Venom proves to be more of a challenge, and as he prepares to impale Peter with Harry's glider, Harry takes the blade for Peter and is tossed aside, falling dozens of stories below. Peter finally manages to defeat Venom, and after coming to a truce and understanding with Sandman, finds a mortally wounded Harry down below with Mary Jane. Peter expresses remorse for hurting Harry, but Harry forgives him and the two reconcile before Harry dies with Peter and Mary Jane at his side. Peter and Mary Jane cry over Harry's death. Both of them attend his funeral, with Peter staying there more than any other mourner, in a state of grief for Harry's death.

=== Alternate universe ===
After Peter is temporarily transported to an alternate reality nineteen years after Harry’s death, during the events of the Marvel Studios film Spider-Man: No Way Home, he reveals to Ned Leeds that Harry, his best friend, "died in his arms after trying to kill him" when he asks Peter if he had a best friend. An alternate version of Harry's father Norman Osborn (from a point prior to his death), who is also transported to this universe, tells that universe's May Parker and Peter Parker that Oscorp does not exist and is feeling uneasy about his son not existing in the universe either.

== In other media ==
=== Television ===
- The character also appears in Spider-Man: The New Animated Series, an animated television series which serves as a loose alternate continuation of the first Spider-Man film. Harry attends Empire State University with Peter and Mary Jane, retaining his desire for revenge on Spider-Man as he believes he caused his father's death although unlike in the progression of the films, he eventually forgives and warms up to the hero and even helps him stop Lizard and Electro. He is voiced by Ian Ziering in the series.

=== Video games ===
- Harry appears in all three video game adaptations of the films. He is voiced by Josh Keaton in the first and second games, and by James Franco in the third game, which sees a good number of the film's cast also reprise their roles vocally. In the first game, Harry is playable, sporting his father's Green Goblin armor and equipment after his death, and has his own bonus storyline, in which he investigates a plot to take over Oscorp while battling another Goblin who claims to have been hired by Norman; Harry is unlocked by completing the game on at least "Hero" difficulty. In the third game, Harry, as the New Goblin, is playable only in the final mission of the Microsoft Windows, PlayStation 3, and Xbox 360 versions, but was later released as downloadable content for both PlayStation Network and Xbox Live; he is also included in the Collectors Edition of the PlayStation 3 version, and is playable in the PC version via mods.
- This version of Harry Osborn appears in his New Goblin persona in Spider-Man: Friend or Foe, once again voiced by Josh Keaton. The game borrows character designs from the Spider-Man film trilogy, but the two properties are otherwise unrelated. Harry first appears in the opening cutscene, helping Spider-Man in a fight against his villains, including Harry's father, the Green Goblin. After the battle, the group is attacked by a swarm of P.H.A.N.T.O.M.s, and Harry and the villains are suddenly teleported elsewhere while Spider-Man is rescued by S.H.I.E.L.D. Harry makes no further appearances in the storyline, but is unlocked as a playable character once the player beats the game; alternatively, he can be unlocked earlier on by entering a special cheat code inside the Helicarrier.

== Reception and legacy ==
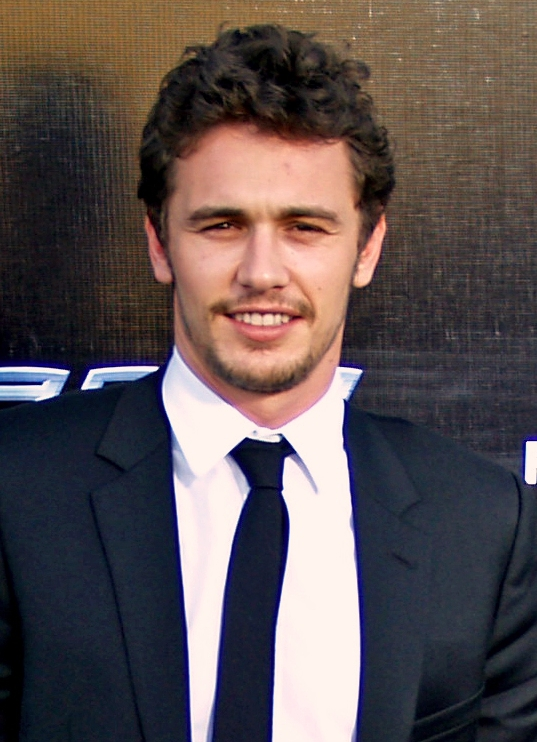
James Franco at the Spider-Man 3 premiere in April 2007.

In the first two films, Harry's presence was noted as brooding by Anthony Lane of The New Yorker. His conversion from one of the film series' main protagonists into a villain in the third movie was met with generally favorable responses. His portrayal in Spider-Man 3 has been generally considered as a good conclusion to his arc and that Franco finally looked comfortable in his film role.

James Franco also received greater mainstream exposure for his portrayal of Harry Osborn in the film series, especially in Spider-Man 3, for which he received four award nominations.

=== In popular culture ===
In the 2013 comedy film This Is the End, which also stars James Franco portraying a fictionalized version of himself, the main characters find a cardboard cutout of Harry Osborn/New Goblin as he appears in Spider-Man 3 in Franco's basement. In addition, the scene in which Harry relishes a slice of pie in Spider-Man 3 has gained meme popularity over the years.
