= Otto Octavius (film character) =

Sam Raimi's Spider-Man film series and Marvel Cinematic Universe character

- Sam Raimi's Spider-Man and Marvel Cinematic Universe character
- Alfred Molina as Otto Octavius in Spider-Man 2 (2004)
- First appearance: Spider-Man 2 (2004)
- Last appearance: Spider-Man: No Way Home (2021)
- Based on: Doctor Octopus by: Stan Lee; Steve Ditko
- Adapted by: Alvin Sargent; Alfred Gough; Miles Millar; Michael Chabon
- Portrayed by: Alfred Molina
- Voiced by: Alfred Molina (Note: Molina voiced the character in the video game film tie-in, Spider-Man 2 (2004) and through archive audio in the film, Spider-Man: Across the Spider-Verse (2023).); Joe Alaskey (Note: Alaskey voiced the character in the video game film tie-in, Spider-Man: Friend or Foe (2007).)

In-universe information
- Full name: Otto Gunther Octavius
- Alias: Doctor Octopus
- Nickname: Doc Ock
- Species: Human cyborg
- Title: Doctor
- Occupation: Physicist
- Affiliation: Oscorp Industries
- Weapon: Four robotic arms with artificial intelligence
- Spouse: Rosalie "Rosie" Octavius (Deceased)
- Nationality: American

Otto Gunther Octavius is a fictional character portrayed by Alfred Molina in Spider-Man 2 (2004) and later in the Marvel Cinematic Universe (MCU) film Spider-Man: No Way Home (2021), based on the Marvel Comics character of the same name. Octavius is introduced in Spider-Man 2, whose research into fusion power with his wife Rosalie (portrayed by Donna Murphy) is being sponsored by Oscorp's genetic and scientific research division, headed by Harry Osborn.

When Octavius' fusion reactor experiment using tritium becomes unstable, resulting in Rosalie's death, the harness of powerful robotic tentacle arms equipped with artificial intelligence (AI) which he was using to safely handle the materials is fused to his body, frying the inhibitor chip keeping the arms from controlling his nervous system. After ending up in the hospital and massacring the surgeons attempting to saw them off, the arms' AI begin influencing his mind and they manipulate him to steal funds in order to attempt the experiment again, over the course of which crime spree the Daily Bugle dubs him Doctor Octopus, or "Doc Ock" for short, regarding him as New York's second effective supervillain. Along the way, he comes into conflict with Spider-Man, with Osborn offering to give Octavius tritium in exchange for handing Spider-Man over to him. Ultimately, as the experiment begins to destroy New York City, Spider-Man reveals himself as Peter to Octavius after damaging his arms, and inspires him to regain control of them and destroy his fusion reactor. A now redeemed Octavius sinks the fusion reactor into the East River, but sacrifices his life in the process.

A past version of the character returns in Spider-Man: No Way Home, being transported into an alternate universe (the Marvel Cinematic Universe) shortly before his redemption and death, due to a magic spell gone wrong causing a rupture in the multiverse, and ends up clashing with that universe's (MCU) Spider-Man and his allies. After the MCU Spider-Man and his closest friend, colleague and Harry's father Norman replaces his faulty inhibitor chip with a working one, Octavius regains control of his arms and his mental state like he did before his original death, and joins the MCU Spider-Man, his Spider-Man and another alternate version of Spider-Man in fighting other universe-displaced supervillains, including Norman's alter ego Green Goblin. After briefly reuniting with his version of Spider-Man, now older, Octavius is returned to a branched/alternate timeline of his universe. Molina has expressed further interest in reprising the role in the in-development Sony's Spider-Man Universe (SSU) film based on The Sinister Six.

Molina's performance as the character, considered one of the earliest portrayals of Octavius as a tragic villain, has been acclaimed by critics and audiences, resultantly the character has come to be considered one of the most iconic villains in the superhero genre.

== Concept and creation ==
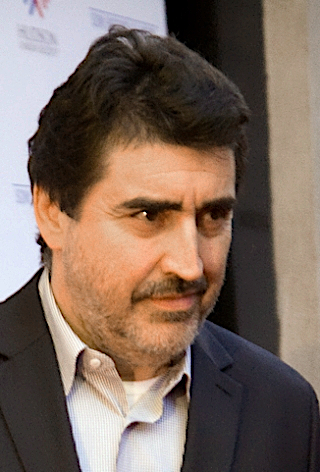
Alfred Molina in 2009

The character of Otto Octavius / Doctor Octopus first appeared in print in The Amazing Spider-Man #3 (July 1963), and was created by writer Stan Lee and artist Steve Ditko. Lee recounted: "usually in creating a villain the first thing I would think of was a name, and then I would try to think of, 'Well, now that I've got the name, who's the character going to be and what will he do?' For some reason, I thought of an octopus. I thought, 'I want to call somebody Octopus. And I want him to have a couple of extra arms just for fun'. But I had to figure out how to do that". The character soon re-appeared in The Amazing Spider-Man #11-12 and then again in #31-33, becoming a fan favorite.

Otto Octavius was originally intended to be the secondary antagonist of Spider-Man (2002), but director Sam Raimi eventually dropped the concept in favor of spending more time with Harry and Norman Osborn. Raimi decided to use Octavius as the main antagonist of Spider-Man 2 (2004) due to being both a visually interesting villain and a character who could be seen as sympathetic. In a draft written by Michael Chabon, a younger Doc Ock becomes infatuated with Mary Jane. His mechanical limbs use endorphins to counteract the pain of being attached to his body, which he enjoys. When he injures two muggers on a date, this horrifies Mary Jane and in the resulting battle with Spider-Man his tentacles are fused together, and the fusion begins to kill him. In the script, Octavius is the creator of the genetically altered spider from the first film, and gives Peter an antidote to remove his powers: this means when Octavius is dying with his tentacles, he wants to extract Spider-Man's spine to save himself. This leads to an alliance with Harry (a detail which made it into the finished film). Beforehand, Harry and the Daily Bugle put a $10 million price on Spider-Man's head, causing the city's citizens to turn against him.

Before Alfred Molina was cast in the role several actors were considered for the role, including Ed Harris, Chris Cooper (who would later portray Norman Osborn in The Amazing Spider-Man 2), and Christopher Walken; In February 2003, Molina was cast as Octavius for the film, undergoing physical training for the role. Raimi had been impressed by his performance in Frida (2002) and also felt that his large physical size was true to the comic book character. Molina was unaware that he was a strong contender for the role, only briefly discussing it. He was excited to get the role, being a big fan of Marvel Comics. Although he was not familiar with Doc Ock, Molina wanted to maintain the cruel, sardonic sense of humor the character had in the comics.

=== Special effects ===
To create Doctor Octopus' mechanical tentacles, Edge FX was hired to create a corset, a metal and rubber girdle, a rubber spine and four foam rubber tentacles which were 8 feet (2.4 m) long and altogether weighed 100 pounds (45 kg). The claws of each tentacle, which were called "death flowers", were controlled by one puppeteer sitting on a chair. Each tentacle was controlled by four people, who rehearsed every scene with Molina so that they could give a natural sense of movement as if the tentacles were moving due to Octavius' muscle movement. On set, Molina referred to his tentacles as "Larry", "Harry", "Moe" and "Flo".

For Spider-Man: No Way Home (2021), Doctor Octopus' mechanical tentacles were created through CGI instead of puppetry. According to Tom Holland, Molina had to subsequently "relearn" how to act using them.

=== Return of the character ===
Upon being cast as the character, Molina signed a three-movie option should the producers chose to renew his contract. Although he told them that he assumed his contract was null and void upon filming his death scene, producer Avi Arad told him to not assume that as "nobody really died" in the Marvel Universe. Molina first expressed interest in portraying the character again in The Amazing Spider-Man series. In an August 2014 interview, while promoting Love Is Strange (2014), Molina expressed his openness to return as Doctor Octopus in a film based on the Sinister Six, then-intended for a 2016 release, after the character's appearance in that film was teased at the end of The Amazing Spider-Man 2 (2014), but reflected that the filmmakers could choose to go for another actor. By September 2019, an untitled The Sinister Six film had re-entered development, Amy Pascal stating the following October that it would feature villains of Marvel Studios' Spider-Man films. By September 2021, the film was confirmed to be in active development, to be set in Sony's Spider-Man Universe.

After The Amazing Spider-Man film series was cancelled, Sony Pictures and Marvel Studios announced in February 2015 that Spider-Man would appear in the MCU, with the character appearing in an MCU film and Sony releasing a Spider-Man film co-produced by Feige and Pascal. Sony Pictures would continue to own, finance, distribute, and exercise final creative control over the Spider-Man films. "For the first few films, it was always, 'How do we do things that have never been done before?' It did not occur to us to do a new Goblin story, or to do an Oscorp story, or to do Doc Ock, or anyone that had been done before, which is why Vulture and Mysterio were really the key characters," Marvel Studios president Kevin Feige reflected. Feige conceded "you can't get better than Alfred Molina as Doc Ock" and furthered that if they "were ever going to bring Doc Ock back, it would have to be Alfred Molina and in early development on this third Homecoming movie, we realized that thanks to the MCU, there was a way to do that."

In December 2020, it was reported that Molina would reprise his role as the character in Spider-Man: No Way Home (2021), which is intended to be set in the Marvel Cinematic Universe. In April 2021, Molina confirmed his involvement with film, calling it "wonderful" to reprise his role. He also revealed that Octavius's story in the film would pick up mere moments after the events of Spider-Man 2. Molina was digitally de-aged in the film to resemble how he appeared in 2004, despite his concerns about his fighting style not looking realistic due to his age in a similar way to Robert De Niro's character in The Irishman (2019).

== Fictional character biography ==
=== Before Spider-Man 2 ===
Dr. Otto Octavius is known as a nuclear physicist, a close friend of Dr. Curt Connors, and a scientific idol of Peter Parker. His work is funded by Oscorp, run by Norman Osborn. Octavius worked primarily at home, with his wife and lab assistant, Rosalie Octavius. They both fell in love because they were passionate and philosophical in their fields of physics and literature.

=== Becoming Doctor Octopus ===
Two years later (2004), Octavius meets Peter Parker through Harry Osborn, Norman Osborn's son and Harry's best friend. He recognizes Parker as the "brilliant but lazy" student of Dr. Curt Connors. Octavius takes a liking to Parker because of his intelligence and shared interests. He encourages Parker's intellect and advises Parker to use it for good.

Octavius later demonstrates his work for Oscorp investors: a nuclear fusion reactor, a 'perpetual sun' created to provide clean and affordable energy. Octavius also invented tools for working with the reactor: four bionic tentacle-like arms that are impervious to heat and magnetism. A metal harness attaches the arms to his torso, and the arms are connected to and controlled by his brain through needles injected into his spinal cord. To protect him from being controlled by the tentacles' AI, he created an inhibitor chip connected to his cerebellum. However, during the experiment, the fusion reactor starts to attract metallic objects inside of its core. Despite Harry demanding Octavius to shut it off, he refuses, thinking that he can control it.

Spider-Man, whom Octavius does not know is Parker, arrives and attempts to shut it off, but Octavius knocks him away. However, the reactor attracts the laboratory's windows, and the shards impale Rosalie, killing her. Octavius is electrocuted by the reactor, causing the neural inhibitor chip to be fried, and the mechanical arms to be fused to his spine. After Spider-Man finally manages to shut off the fusion reactor, everyone present on the scene is evacuated and Oscorp becomes bankrupt. Octavius is taken to a hospital, where surgeons attempt to saw off the tentacles, but with the inhibitor chip fried, they act of their own free will, killing the surgeons and bringing Octavius to an abandoned warehouse. Octavius considers committing suicide, but the tentacles encourage him to rebuild the reactor. Succumbing to the AI's manipulations, he robs a bank to fund his experiment before being thwarted by Spider-Man.

Afterwards, J. Jonah Jameson of the Daily Bugle, and his lackey, Hoffman, dub him Doctor Octopus, or Doc Ock. A desperate Harry strikes a deal with Octavius to bring Spider-Man alive to him in exchange for more tritium, which he needs to build the reactor. Octavius initially threatens Parker, who is connected to Spider-Man through his photography, demanding to know his whereabouts. When Parker claims he does not know where Spider-Man is, Octavius kidnaps Parker's friend and love interest, Mary Jane Watson as leverage. Parker, as Spider-Man, battles Octavius atop a New York City Subway train; after sabotaging the train, Octavius leaves Spider-Man to save the passengers. After he does, Octavius returns and captures Spider-Man, weakened after using all of his strength to stop the train, delivering him to Harry. In return, Harry gives Octavius the promised tritium, and Octavius begins his second attempt at the fusion reactor.

With the increased quantity of tritium, the fusion reactor becomes strong enough to attract half of the city into its core, along with Mary Jane, who is being held captive in the warehouse. Spider-Man arrives in time to save her, apprehend Octavius, and convinces him to take back control of the arms and shut down the reactor. Octavius drowns the reactor in the East River, taking himself with it.

=== Entering an alternate reality ===
In the alternate reality of Earth-616, during the year 2024, Dr. Stephen Strange casts a spell to restore the secret identity of his Peter Parker (dubbed "Peter-One") after it was revealed by Mysterio. (Note: As depicted in Spider-Man: Far From Home (2019).) However, Peter-One's frequent alterations causes the spell to bring in people from across the multiverse who knew Parker's identity, including Octavius. After being transported to this new reality, Octavius, still under the control of his AI arms, encounters Peter-One on the Alexander Hamilton Bridge. Believing Peter-One is his Spider-Man and that he did something with his fusion reactor, Octavius battles him and steals a piece of his nanotechnological Iron Spider suit, upgrading his arms. After discovering Peter-One is not his Parker, Octavius loses control of his arms when Peter-One uses the stolen nanotechnology to hack into them. Peter-One interrogates Octavius, but they are interrupted by an alternate version of the Green Goblin, whom Octavius recognizes as his late friend, Norman Osborn.

Strange teleports the two of them to the New York Sanctum and locks Octavius in a cell next to an alternate version of Curt Connors from another universe. Later, Octavius meets Max Dillon (from Connor's universe) and Flint Marko (from his own universe), and reunites with Osborn; the two learn from Marko that they both died while fighting their Spider-Man, which Octavius angrily refuses to believe, but is convinced, after realizing that his fight with his Spider-Man was the only thing he remembered before being brought to this universe. Strange, however, arrives and locks Osborn in another cell, preparing to send the villains back to their universes, though the villains are against being sent back to their universes because they don't want to die upon return. Wanting to save the villains, Peter-One fights and traps Strange in the Mirror Dimension, intending to cure them. Hearing Peter-One's intentions to cure the villains, Octavius is reluctant, believing he does not need fixing.

Despite being unwilling, Octavius is convinced to come with Spider-Man, but protests when Peter-One decides to cure him first. Nonetheless, Peter-One and Osborn—resisting his Goblin alter ego—create a new inhibitor chip. To prevent the new chip from being fried like the original one, they encase the new one in metal. The new chip frees Octavius from the tentacles' influence. Octavius expresses his gratitude to Peter-One for his help, returns the nanites he absorbed back to Peter's suit, and offers to help cure the remaining villains, but Osborn's Green Goblin persona retakes control of him and convinces the uncured villains to fight back. Octavius flees during the battle. However, Octavius later assists his universe's Parker, Peter-One and an alternate version of Parker from Dillon's and Connors' universe (nicknamed "Peter-Three")—all of whom have been brought to Peter-One's universe by Strange's spell—to cure Dillon and fight back against the Green Goblin, while also briefly having an emotional reunion with his universe's Peter. Afterwards, Strange returns Octavius and the other displaced individuals to their respective universes. (Note: More specifically, to the point where they were originally taken in the timeline. In Octavius's case, this is a diverged timeline occurring during the events of Spider-Man 2 (2004), possibly averting his death as a result.)

== Characterization ==
Although Octavius maintains the egocentric, selfish and arrogant nature of his comic counterpart when under the influence of the arms, he is shown to be more friendly and well-meaning pre-accident. These changes to his character aid the emotional through-line of the film. Despite his role as the main antagonist, Octavius' story and character arc in the film bear more resemblance to a Byronic Hero or Antihero archetype.

David Crow of Den of Geek calls Octavius "a megalomaniacal fiend" who, despite building four mechanical arms, is "still inexplicably searching for a creation that will justify his genius and get him worldwide acclaim." Crow notes that the relationships Octavius has with his wife and Peter "give the accident which welds the mechanical arms to his spine and drives him insane some emotional weight."

== In other media ==
=== Films ===
- A TV spot for the Sony Pictures Animation film Spider-Man: Across the Spider-Verse (2023) includes the cameo appearance of a comic book design-accurate Doctor Octopus for the sequence in which Miles Morales / Spider-Man is escaping from Miguel O'Hara / Spider-Man and his Spider-Army with archive audio of Molina's Otto Octavius saying his iconic "Hello, Peter" line from No Way Home.

=== Video games ===
- Molina reprises his role as Otto Octavius in the video game adaptation of Spider-Man 2 (2004).
- The film version of Otto Octavius appears as a playable character in Spider-Man: Friend or Foe (2007), albeit voiced by Joe Alaskey. This version went through similar events, but survived his death and didn't redeem. Octavius joins several of Spider-Man's enemies in an attempt to kill him, but they are attacked by a swarm of symbiote-like creatures called P.H.A.N.T.O.M.s created by Mysterio, which brainwash the villains and teleport them across the world, with Octavius being sent to Tokyo to build a P.H.A.N.T.O.M. generator. After Spider-Man is recruited by S.H.I.E.L.D. to stop the P.H.A.N.T.O.M.s, his journey takes him to Tokyo, where he frees Octavius from Mysterio's control. Following this, Octavius reluctantly joins forces with Spider-Man to stop Mysterio.

== Reception and legacy ==
Molina's role in Spider-Man 2 has been widely well-received. In May 2014, IndieWire ranked him as the 5th greatest film supervillain of all time. Additionally, Abraham Riesman of Vulture.com in his February 2018 list placed the character as number 16 in the rank of his 25 greatest movie supervillains. Den of Geek, Screen Rant, and Collider ranked Doc Ock as the greatest villain in the Spider-Man film franchise. The special effects used for his robotic arms were also praised, with Roger Ebert calling it the film's "special-effects triumph". Chicago Tribune's Mark Caro stated that Octavius was a "pleasingly complex" villain in Spider-Man 2, with Kenneth Turan of the Los Angeles Times concurring with Caro, opining, "Doc Ock grabs this film with his quartet of sinisterly serpentine mechanical arms and refuses to let go." IGN's Richard George felt "Sam Raimi and his writing team delivered an iconic, compelling version of Spider-Man's classic foe... we almost wish there was a way to retroactively add some of these elements to the original character." Empire also praised Octavius as a "superior villain" in 2015.

The character's revival in Spider-Man: No Way Home (2021) was spotlighted before the release of the film with a trailer. The reveal was cited as a highlight and inspired various Internet memes of the scene of Octavius saying "Hello, Peter". While looking back at Sam Raimi's 2000s trilogy, Tom Holland, who portrays Spider-Man in the Marvel Cinematic Universe, praised Molina's performance in Spider-Man 2, noting that he was initially terrified of the character back when he saw Spider-Man 2 for the first time. Holland later expressed his enjoyment at later working with Molina in Spider-Man: No Way Home, calling Molina "one of [his] favorite people [he]'s ever worked with". Benjamin Lee, Neil Soans, Manohla Dargis, Peter Travers, and Jade King singled out Norman Osborn portrayer Willem Dafoe and Molina for praise, King asserting that the two stole "the show as Green Goblin and Doc Ock" and were "brilliant depictions of these characters".

=== Awards and nominations ===
Molina has received multiple nominations and an award for his portrayal of Otto Octavius.

Year	Film	Award	Category	Result	Ref(s)
2005	Spider-Man 2	London Film Critics' Circle	British Supporting Actor of the Year	Nominated	
2005	Spider-Man 2	MTV Movie Awards	Best Villain	Nominated	
2005	Spider-Man 2	Satellite Awards	Best Actor in a Supporting Role, Drama	Nominated	
2005	Spider-Man 2	Saturn Awards	Best Supporting Actor	Nominated	
2005	Spider-Man 2	Visual Effects Society Awards	Outstanding Performance by an Actor or Actress in a Visual Effects Film	Won	
2022	Spider-Man: No Way Home	Saturn Awards	Best Supporting Actor	Nominated	

== See also ==
- Characters of the Marvel Cinematic Universe
- Doctor Octopus
