= Spider-Man 3 =

2007 film by Sam Raimi

- Theatrical release poster
- Directed by: Sam Raimi
- Screenplay by: Sam Raimi; Ivan Raimi; Alvin Sargent
- Story by: Sam Raimi; Ivan Raimi
- Based on: Spider-Man by: Stan Lee; Steve Ditko
- Produced by: Laura Ziskin; Avi Arad; Grant Curtis
- Starring: Tobey Maguire; Kirsten Dunst; James Franco; Thomas Haden Church; Topher Grace; Bryce Dallas Howard; James Cromwell; Rosemary Harris; J. K. Simmons
- Cinematography: Bill Pope
- Edited by: Bob Murawski
- Music by: Christopher Young (Note: Original music themes by Danny Elfman)
- Production companies: Columbia Pictures; Marvel Entertainment (Note: The company is erroneously credited as Marvel Studios, despite Spider-Man 3 not being financed by the studio or placed within the Marvel Cinematic Universe franchise which began a year later.); Laura Ziskin Productions
- Distributed by: Sony Pictures Releasing
- Release dates: April 16, 2007 (Roppongi Hills Mori Tower); May 4, 2007 (United States)
- Running time: 139 minutes
- Country: United States
- Language: English
- Budget: $258–350 million
- Box office: $896.3 million

Spider-Man 3 is a 2007 American superhero film directed by Sam Raimi, who co-wrote it with his brother Ivan and Alvin Sargent. Based on the Marvel Comics character Spider-Man, it is the final film in Raimi's Spider-Man trilogy and the sequel to Spider-Man 2 (2004). Tobey Maguire stars as Peter Parker / Spider-Man, alongside Kirsten Dunst, James Franco, Thomas Haden Church, Topher Grace, Bryce Dallas Howard, James Cromwell, Rosemary Harris, and J. K. Simmons. Set a year after the events of Spider-Man 2, the film follows Peter as he prepares for his future with his girlfriend Mary Jane Watson, while facing the Sandman, Venom, and his vengeful friend Harry Osborn.

After the successful release of Spider-Man 2 in 2004, development immediately began on Spider-Man 3, with the aim of a 2007 release. During preproduction, Raimi wanted two villains, Harry and Sandman. At the request of producer Avi Arad, he added Venom to the list, and the producers also requested the addition of Gwen Stacy. Principal photography for the film began in January 2006 and took place in Los Angeles and Cleveland before moving to New York City from May until July 2006. Additional pick-up shots were made after August, and the film wrapped in October 2006. During post-production, Sony Pictures Imageworks created over 900 visual effects shots. Christopher Young was hired to compose the score of Spider-Man 3 after Danny Elfman, who had scored the two previous films, declined to return due to creative differences and conflicts with Raimi. With an estimated production budget of $258–350 million, Spider-Man 3 was the most expensive film ever made at the time of its release.

Spider-Man 3 premiered on April 16, 2007, in Tokyo, and was released in the United States in both conventional and IMAX theaters on May 4. The film grossed $895.9 million worldwide, making it the highest-grossing film of the trilogy, the third-highest-grossing film of 2007 and the tenth-highest-grossing film of all time at the time of its release. It was also the highest-grossing Spider-Man film until it was surpassed by Spider-Man: Far From Home in 2019. Unlike the previous films in the trilogy, Spider-Man 3 received mixed reviews from critics. A sequel, Spider-Man 4, was set to be released in 2011, but was cancelled. A reboot, The Amazing Spider-Man, was released in 2012 with a new cast and crew. Maguire and Church later reprised their roles in Spider-Man: No Way Home (2021), which explores the concept of the multiverse and links the Raimi trilogy to the Marvel Cinematic Universe.

== Plot ==
Peter Parker plans to propose to Mary Jane Watson, who has made her Broadway debut. While he is on a date with her in Central Park, an extraterrestrial symbiote oozes out of a fallen meteorite and attaches to his moped. Harry Osborn, knowing Peter is Spider-Man, seeks to avenge the death of his father Norman. (Note: As depicted in Spider-Man (2002).) He uses his father's performance-enhancing gas and Green Goblin technology to battle Peter, but falls from his glider and develops partial amnesia, forgetting that Peter is Spider-Man. Shortly after, Peter saves Gwen Stacy, daughter of police captain George Stacy, from falling from a skyscraper. Meanwhile, police pursue the escaped convict Flint Marko, who visits his wife and sick daughter before fleeing. He falls into a particle accelerator which fuses his body with sand, turning him into Sandman and granting him the ability to reform his body at will.

During a ceremony honoring Spider-Man, Peter kisses Gwen to please the crowd, which angers Mary Jane. Soon after, Marko robs an armored truck and fights Spider-Man, then flees. Captain Stacy informs Peter and Aunt May that Marko was Ben's true killer; the initial suspect was simply Marko's accomplice. When Peter falls asleep in his Spider-Man suit, the symbiote integrates into the suit. Peter awakens atop a building, discovering that the symbiote has turned his suit black, enhanced his powers, and increased his aggression.

Peter battles Marko in a subway station. Realizing that water weakens him, Peter forces open a pipe, which turns Marko into mud and washes him away. Peter's new arrogant attitude alienates Mary Jane, who kisses Harry before quickly regretting it. A hallucination of his father prompts Harry to recover from amnesia, and he blackmails Mary Jane into breaking up with Peter. Harry tells Peter that he is dating Mary Jane, which leads Peter to fight him while under the symbiote's influence. During the fight, Harry's face is disfigured by one of his own pumpkin bombs.

At the Daily Bugle, Peter exposes the misconduct of his rival photographer Eddie Brock, whose fake photos falsely incriminate Spider-Man. Editor J. Jonah Jameson fires Brock and promotes Peter to staff photographer. Peter brings Gwen to a jazz club where Mary Jane now works, hoping to make her jealous. Realizing Peter's intentions, Gwen apologizes to Mary Jane and leaves. Peter assaults the bouncers and accidentally hits Mary Jane, before realizing how deeply the symbiote is corrupting him. He retreats to a church bell tower, where he discovers that the sound of clanging metal weakens the symbiote. Using the sound of the church bell, Peter detaches it from himself. Brock witnesses the event, then becomes the symbiote's new host and turns into Venom.

Brock and Marko join forces against Spider-Man, kidnapping Mary Jane to draw Peter out. After Harry declines to help Peter rescue Mary Jane, Harry's butler reveals that Norman's death was not Spider-Man's fault. As Brock and Marko capture Peter, Harry arrives and helps Peter subdue Marko. Brock attempts to impale Peter with Harry's glider, but Harry jumps in the way and is impaled instead. Remembering the symbiote's weakness, Peter uses metal pipes to create a sonic attack, which allows him to separate the symbiote from Brock. Peter throws a pumpkin bomb at the symbiote, but not before Brock, now addicted to its influence, rushes towards the symbiote, which causes him to be killed along with it.

Marko explains to Peter that Ben's death was an accident and that everything Marko has done was to help his daughter. Peter forgives Marko and allows him to leave. Harry reconciles with Peter before he dies from his injuries. After Harry's funeral, Peter visits Mary Jane at the jazz club, where they share a dance.

== Cast ==
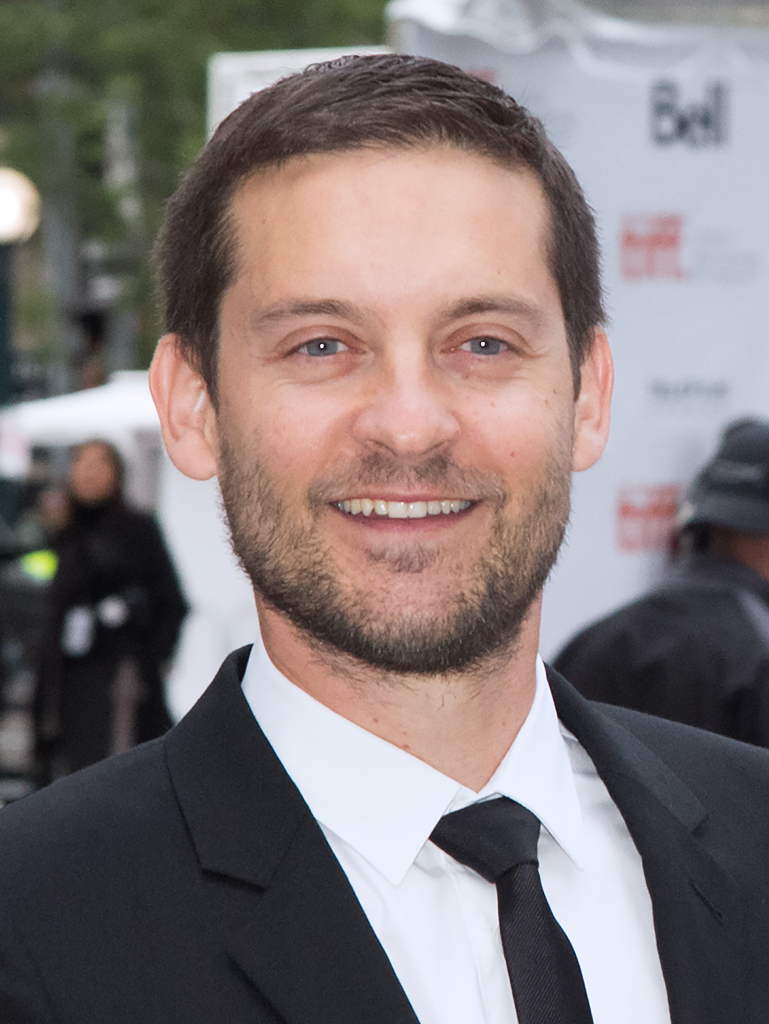
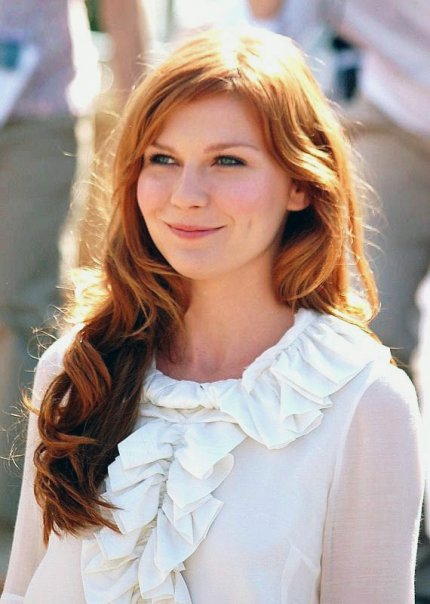
Tobey Maguire (left, pictured in 2014) and Kirsten Dunst (2006)
- Tobey Maguire as Peter Parker / Spider-Man:
  A student at Columbia University who fights crime as a masked vigilante. Maguire said he relished the opportunity to play a less timid Peter in this film.
- Kirsten Dunst as Mary Jane Watson:
  Peter's girlfriend who makes her debut on Broadway. Initially, the script had Gwen Stacy being abducted instead of Mary Jane, since Raimi did not want Mary Jane to be kidnapped for the third time in the series. However, Gwen's role in the film was reduced late in production, which required that Mary Jane take her place as the character in peril.
- James Franco as Harry Osborn / New Goblin:
  Peter's former best friend who believes Peter killed his father, Norman Osborn.
- Thomas Haden Church as Flint Marko / Sandman:
  An escaped convict who transforms into the shapeshifting Sandman after a freak accident. Church, who was approached for the role because of his award-winning performance in Sideways, worked out for 16 months to build the necessary muscle to play the character. (Note: Attributed to multiple references:) Church's version of Sandman was influenced by Frankenstein's monster, the folklore character Golem, and the sadness that Lon Chaney Jr. brought to his portrayals of misunderstood creatures, such as the Wolf Man.
- Topher Grace as Edward "Eddie" Brock Jr. / Venom:
  Peter's rival photographer at the Daily Bugle who becomes possessed by an extraterrestrial symbiote. Grace had impressed the producers with his performance in the film In Good Company. As a comics fan who read Venom stories during his childhood, Grace viewed his character as someone under the influence of a substance, similar to an alcoholic or drug addict. (Note: Attributed to multiple references:) Grace described Brock as a mirror to Peter, with both characters having similar jobs and romantic interests. He spent six months working out to prepare for the role. His Venom costume took an hour to put on, prosthetics took four hours to apply, and the fangs he wore bruised his gums. The costume had to be constantly smeared with a viscous substance to give it a liquid-like look and feel, which Grace found unpleasant.
- Bryce Dallas Howard as Gwen Stacy:
  Peter's lab partner in his physics class. Howard sought to portray Gwen not as merely a "man-stealing tart", but also as a possible future girlfriend for Peter.
- James Cromwell as Captain George Stacy: Gwen's father and an NYPD captain.
- Rosemary Harris as May Parker: Peter's aunt.
- J. K. Simmons as J. Jonah Jameson: The editor of the Daily Bugle.

Dylan Baker portrays Dr. Curt Connors, Peter's college physics professor, while Willem Dafoe plays Harry's deceased father Norman Osborn, who returns as a hallucination. Cliff Robertson makes a brief appearance as Ben Parker in a flashback scene. Ted Raimi appears as the Daily Bugle employee Ted Hoffman, Bill Nunn plays Joseph "Robbie" Robertson, and Elizabeth Banks returns as Bugle receptionist Betty Brant. Michael Papajohn returns as the carjacker from Spider-Man, while John Paxton portrays Bernard Houseman, the Osborn family's butler. Elya Baskin reprises his role as Peter's landlord, Mr. Ditkovitch, while Mageina Tovah returns as his daughter, Ursula. Joe Manganiello reprises his role as Flash Thompson, while Becky Ann Baker appears as Mrs. Stacy. Theresa Russell plays Marko's wife Emma, with Perla Haney-Jardine portraying his daughter Penny. Bruce Campbell plays a French maître d'.

Cameo appearances include Dean Edwards as a newspaper reader who criticizes Spider-Man, Lucy Gordon as newscaster Jennifer Dugan, and newscaster Hal Fishman as himself. Grant Curtis, one of the film's producers, plays the driver of an armored car attacked by Sandman, while the film's composer Christopher Young appears as a theater pianist. Spider-Man co-creator Stan Lee also has a cameo in the film.

== Production ==
=== Development ===
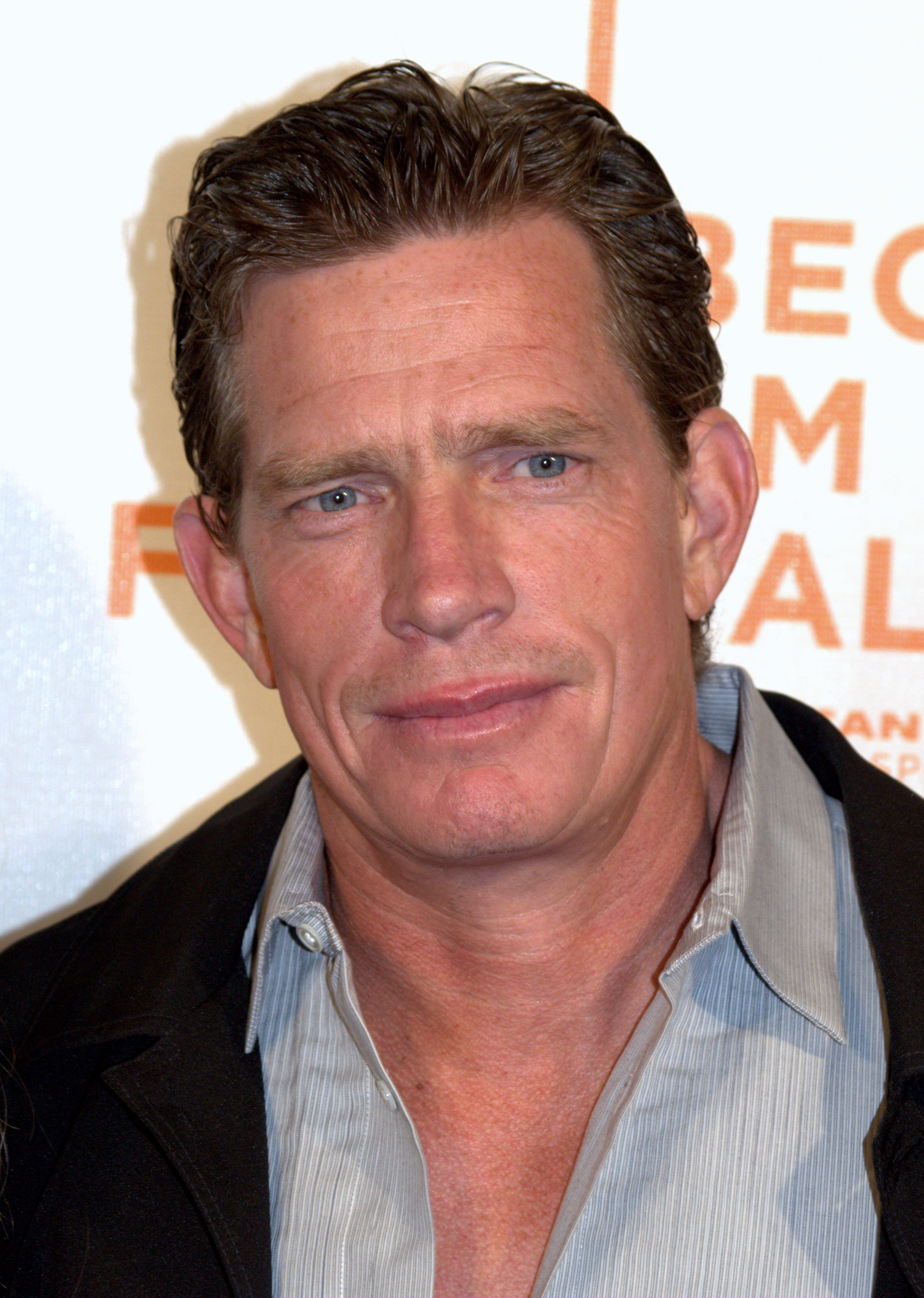
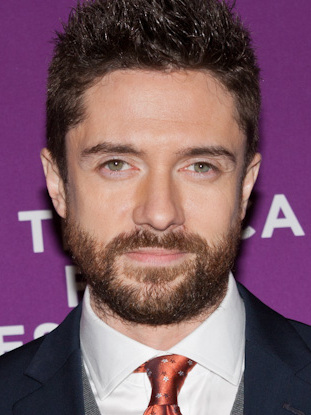
Both Thomas Haden Church (left, pictured in 2009) and Topher Grace (2012) put on muscle to play their respective villains.

Ahead of the June 2004 release of Sam Raimi's Spider-Man 2, Sony Pictures announced that Spider-Man 3 was already in development for a summer 2007 release. In January 2005, Sony finalized a seven-figure contract with Spider-Man 2 screenwriter Alvin Sargent to write Spider-Man 3, with an option to write the script for a fourth film. Sam Raimi and his brother Ivan Raimi wrote a treatment for Spider-Man 3 over two months; a central theme was Peter learning that he is not a sinless hero, and that there is humanity in the criminals he pursues. Flint Marko / Sandman was introduced as an antagonist, as Raimi found him a visually fascinating character. While Sandman is a petty criminal in the comics, the screenwriters made him Uncle Ben's killer in the film to increase Peter's guilt over Ben's death and to challenge Peter's simplistic perception of the event. Raimi said that Peter undergoes a journey of forgiveness in the film.

Producer Avi Arad felt that the previous two films had relied too much on Raimi's favorite villains, and not enough on fan-favorite villains. (Note: Attributed to multiple references:) He convinced Raimi to include Venom, a character whose "lack of humanity" Raimi had criticized, but whose alter-ego, Eddie Brock, already had a minor role in the script. (Note: In 2018, Arad acknowledged that many fans were disappointed with the depiction of Venom in the film. He admitted that he pushed Raimi to include the character, and said he learned that Venom is "not a sideshow".) (Note: Attributed to multiple references:) Gwen Stacy was added at the suggestion of producer Laura Ziskin, and at one point the Vulture was in the script—he was depicted as an accomplice of Sandman, and Ben Kingsley was being considered for the role. (Note: Attributed to multiple references:) With so many characters, Sargent soon found his script so complex that he considered splitting it into two films, but abandoned the idea when he could not create a successful intermediate climax.

=== Filming ===
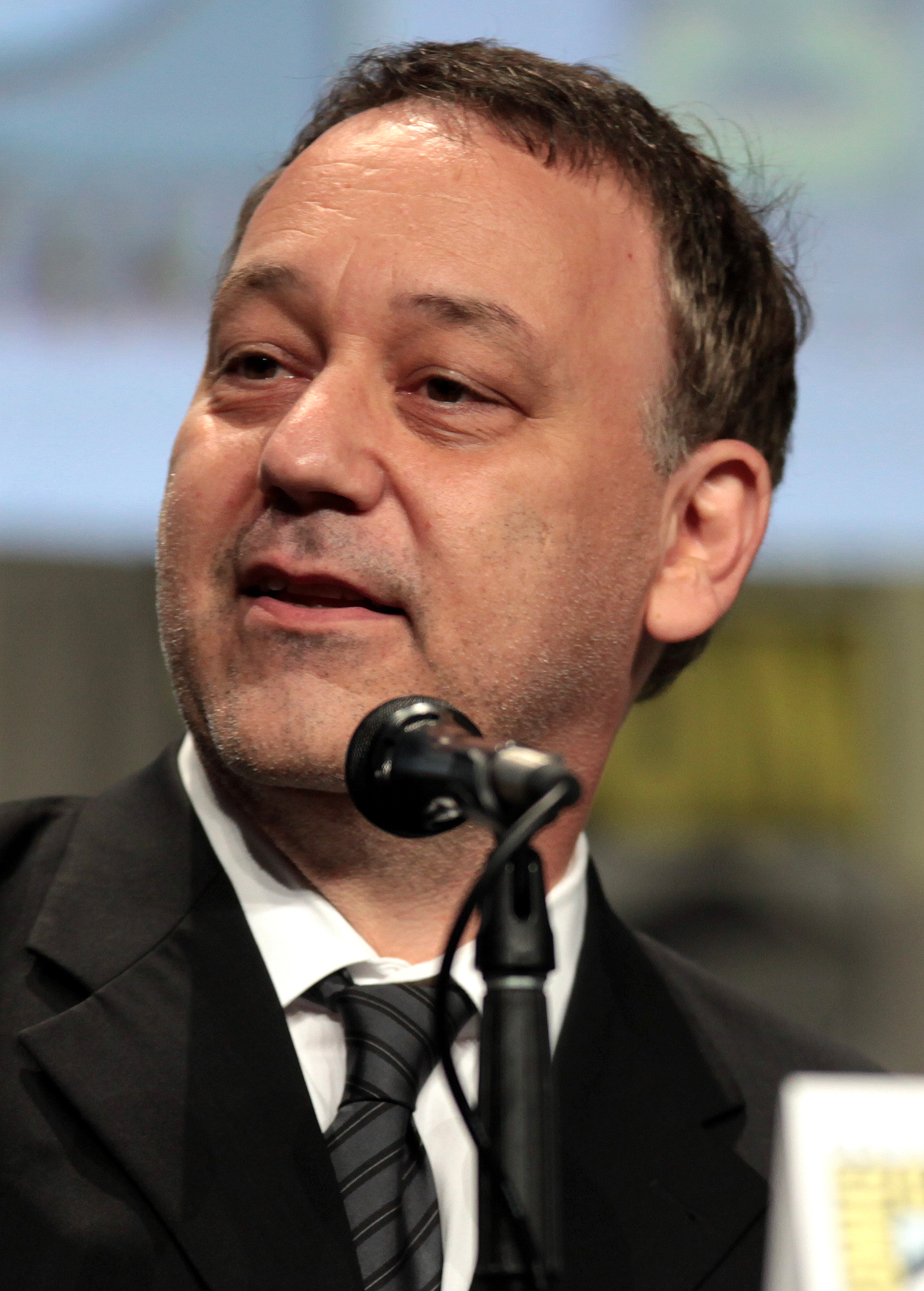
Director Sam Raimi, pictured in 2014

In November 2005, camera crews spent two weeks filming scenes that would require significant visual effects so that Sony Pictures Imageworks could begin work on them as early as possible. The same approach had been used during production of Spider-Man 2 for effects-laden sequences involving Doctor Octopus.

Principal photography for Spider-Man 3 began on January 16, 2006 in Culver City, California. During April, some of the crew filmed the armored car fight scene in Cleveland, Ohio, after the Cleveland Film Commission offered free production space at the Cleveland Convention Center. On May 19, production moved to Manhattan. Shooting was demanding for both Raimi, who sometimes had to shuttle between up to seven working sets, and for cinematographer Bill Pope, who had to film night scenes with three black-costumed characters: Venom, the New Goblin, and the symbiote-possessed Spider-Man. For the scene in the jazz club, Maguire at first did not want to dance, but relented after choreographer Marguerite Derricks showed him some Fred Astaire dance moves. Filming wrapped in July 2006, after more than 100 days.

=== Visual effects ===
John Dykstra, who won the Academy Award for Best Visual Effects for his work on Spider-Man 2, declined to work on the third film as visual effects supervisor. Scott Stokdyk took his place, leading two hundred programmers at Sony Pictures Imageworks. This group designed computer programs that did not exist when Spider-Man 3 began production, and created nine hundred visual effects shots for the film. Producer Laura Ziskin said the film's visual effects cost 30% more than those of Spider-Man 2.

One-handed kickboxer Baxter Humby stood in for Spider-Man during the scene in which he punches through the chest of Sandman.

For the crane disaster scene in which Spider-Man rescues Gwen Stacy, Stokdyk created a 1:16 scale miniature of a skyscraper section. Using the miniature instead of computer-generated imagery (CGI) made it possible to portray damage to the building realistically and without guesswork involving computer models. Visual effects were also used; Cafe FX assisted with effects for the scene and also for the film's climactic battle.

To create sand effects for scenes with Sandman, experiments were done with twelve types of sand, such as splashing, launching it at stuntmen, and pouring it over ledges; the various types of sand movement were then recreated digitally. For scenes that involved burying actors in sand, ground-up corn-cobs were used instead of sand for the actors' safety. For the shot where Spider-Man punches through Sandman's chest, the one-handed kickboxing champion Baxter Humby stood in for Maguire.

The symbiote suit worn by Spider-Man in the comics is plain black with a large white spider on the front and back, but the design for the film was changed to a black version of Spider-Man's traditional costume, complete with a webbing motif. The filmmakers decided to give Venom's suit the webbing motif as well, with producer Grant Curtis calling it a "twisted and mangled" version of the Spider-Man suit. Venom's suit was also designed to appear as if were gripping onto Brock's body. To make Venom move in an animalistic way, the animators drew inspiration from the movements of predatory animals such as lions and cheetahs.

== Music ==
Christopher Young was hired to compose the score for Spider-Man 3 after Danny Elfman, the composer for the two previous films, declined to return due to a strained relationship with Raimi. (Note: Attributed to multiple references:) Young said that Sandman's musical theme uses contrabass saxophones, contrabass clarinets, contrabassoons and very low French horns to create a "low, aggressive and heavy" sound. Young's theme for Venom treats the character as if he were the "devil personified", resulting in what Young described as a vicious and demonic sound. Raimi rejected the initial version of Young's music for the "birth" of Sandman, finding it too monstrous and not tragic enough. Young wrote new themes for Aunt May and Mary Jane, but these were ultimately cut by the producers and replaced with music from the previous films that was familiar to audiences.

== Marketing ==
The marketing campaign for Spider-Man 3 included various special events just before the film's release at various locations in New York City. These included a spider exhibit at the American Museum of Natural History, workshops on baby spider plants at the New York Botanical Garden, a Green Goblin mask-making workshop at the Children's Museum of Manhattan, and a scavenger hunt and "Bugmania" show at the Central Park Zoo.

The teaser trailer debuted on June 27, 2006, attached to screenings of Superman Returns. Promotional tie-in partners included Burger King, 7-Eleven, General Mills, Kraft Foods, and Comcast. Hasbro released various toys, including a web blaster and several lines of action figures. Toys featuring various Spider-Man villains were released, including the Green Goblin, Doctor Octopus, the Lizard, the Scorpion, Kraven the Hunter, and Rhino. Japanese Medicom Toy Corporation produced Spider-Man 3 collectibles, which were distributed by Sideshow Collectibles in the United States. A prequel comic was released in June 2007. Spider-Man 3: The Black, a comic which expands upon the birth of Venom, was released in November 2007.

== Release ==
=== Theatrical ===
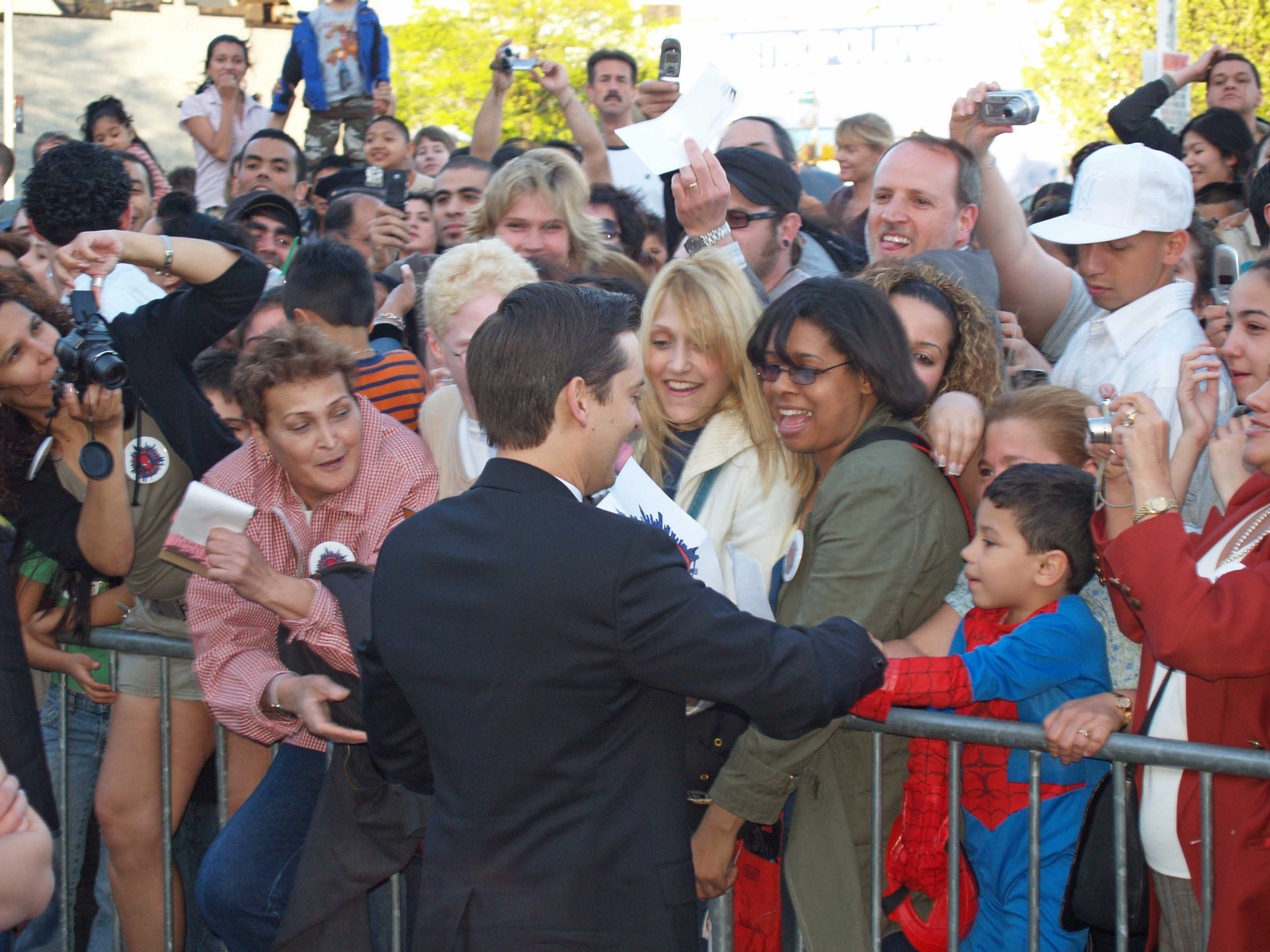
Tobey Maguire greets fans at the premiere in Queens, New York.

Spider-Man 3 had its world premiere at Roppongi Hills Mori Tower in Tokyo on April 16, 2007. The United Kingdom premiere took place on April 23, at the Odeon Leicester Square theater, while the United States premiere occurred at the Tribeca Film Festival in Queens on April 30. On May 1, Spider-Man 3 was released in sixteen territories. It was released in China on May 3, and in the United States and Canada on May 4. By May 6, the film had opened in 107 countries. (Note: Attributed to multiple references:)

The film opened in 4,253 theaters in the United States and Canada, including fifty-three IMAX theaters. It was the widest release in history at the time, surpassing Shrek 2 (2004). (Note: Attributed to multiple references:) Tracking data a month before the US-Canada release reflected over 90% awareness of the film and over 20% first choice among moviegoers, statistics that estimated an opening weekend of over $100 million. Online ticket pre-orders for Spider-Man 3 were purchased at a faster rate than online tickets for Spider-Man 2. On May 2, Fandango reported a sales rate for online tickets six times higher than for Spider-Man 2. The strong ticket sales caused theaters to add 3:00 AM showings following the May 4 midnight showing to accommodate the demand.

In March 2024, Sony announced that all of its live-action Spider-Man films would be re-released in theaters as part of Columbia Pictures' 100th anniversary celebration. Spider-Man 3 was re-released on April 29, 2024. In June 2025, it was announced that Sony, in collaboration with Fathom Events, would be re-releasing the Sam Raimi Spider-Man trilogy in theaters. Spider-Man 3 was re-released on September 28, 2025, and was followed by an encore screening on October 5.

=== Box office ===
In the United States and Canada, Spider-Man 3 was released in 4,252 theaters on Friday, May 4, 2007. It sold an estimated 48.9 million tickets. It set an opening-day (and single-day) record with $59.8 million, with $10 million coming from midnight showings. The film set an opening-weekend record with $151.1 million and an IMAX opening-weekend record with $4.8 million, surpassing the 2006 films Pirates of the Caribbean: Dead Man's Chest and 300 respectively. (Note: Attributed to multiple references:) It set records for highest Friday, Saturday and Sunday grosses and achieved the largest cumulative gross through its second, third, and fourth day of release. (Note: Attributed to multiple references:) Upon release, Spider-Man 3 was ranked first at the box office, surpassing Disturbia and Lucky You. During its second weekend, its gross declined by 61.5% to $58.1 million, but it stayed at the top of the box office ahead of newcomers 28 Weeks Later and Georgia Rule. Spider-Man 3 was dethroned by Shrek the Third in its third weekend, dropping into second place. (Note: Attributed to multiple references:) In the United States and Canada, it is the highest-grossing film of 2007 and the third-highest-grossing film distributed by Sony/Columbia.

Spider-Man 3 was released outside the United States and Canada on Tuesday, May 1, 2007. On its opening day it grossed $29.2 million from 16 territories, an 86% increase over Spider-Man 2 on its first day of release. Spider-Man 3 set new opening-day records in 10 of the 16 territories, including France, where it earned $6.8 million. It had the third-highest opening of any film in both the United Kingdom—where it grossed $16.1 million—and in Austria. Its Japanese opening generated a total of $3.7 million, making it the country's highest Tuesday gross of any film. Outside the United States and Canada, it was first at the box office for three consecutive weekends. In India, it grossed a total of $16.4 million during its theatrical run, and was the seventh-highest-grossing film of 2007. (Note: Attributed to multiple references:)

During its theatrical run, Spider-Man 3 earned $336.5 million in the United States and Canada and $554.3 million in other countries for a worldwide total of $890.9 million. The film set a worldwide single-day record of $104 million on its first Friday and broke its own record again on Saturday with $117.6 million. It also set a worldwide opening-weekend record with $381.7 million, surpassing Star Wars: Episode III – Revenge of the Sith (2005). The film's IMAX screenings reached $20 million in 30 days, faster than any other 2D film remastered in the format. Worldwide, it is the third-highest-grossing film of 2007, the highest-grossing film of Sam Raimi's Spider-Man trilogy, and was the highest-grossing film distributed by Sony/Columbia until Skyfall (2012). As of April 2026, it is the 84th-highest-grossing film of all time in both the US-Canada market and worldwide. (Note: Attributed to multiple references:)

=== Home media ===
The television channel FX signed a five-year deal for the rights to Spider-Man 3, which it began airing in 2009. The film was released on DVD in Australia in September 2007 and in the United Kingdom that October. To promote the DVD and Blu-ray release in the United States and Canada on October 30, Sony partnered with Papa John's Pizza, Pringles, Blu Tack, Jolly Time Pop Corn, and Nutella.

For the 10th anniversary of Spider-Man 3 in 2017, Sony released a version of the film titled Spider-Man 3: Editor's Cut, which was included in the Spider-Man Limited Edition Blu-ray collection released on June 13. In this version of the film, some scenes are shifted around or have been completely removed, and there are three new scenes, three alternate climax sequences, and one extended scene. This version also features previously-unused music from Christopher Young. Spider-Man 3: Editor's Cut was later re-released with the Spider-Man Legacy Collection 4K Blu-ray Box Set.

In the United States, Spider-Man 3 grossed more than $43.76 million from DVD and video rentals within 11 weeks. It grossed more than $125 million in DVD sales, reaching the top of the sales chart during its first week on the market, beating out Transformers, Meet the Robinsons, and License to Wed. However, DVD sales figures did not meet industry expectations. The film sold 130,000 Blu-ray copies within its first week of release, surpassing Casino Royale (2006) for the highest first-week Blu-ray sales, and also became Sony's all-time best-selling Blu-ray release. On October 17, 2017, Spider-Man 3 was included in The Spider-Man Legacy Collection, which includes five major Spider-Man films in a 4K UHD Blu-Ray set.

In April 2021, Sony signed a deal with Disney to allow Sony's films, including past Spider-Man films, films in Sony's Spider-Man Universe, and other Marvel content to stream on Hulu and Disney+. A significant number of Sony films began streaming on Hulu starting in June 2021. While the deal only concerned the United States, films from Sony Pictures—including The Amazing Spider-Man 2—began to appear on Disney+ in regions outside of the US as early as June 2022. Raimi's Spider-Man trilogy was released on Disney+ on April 21, 2023.

== Reception ==
On the review aggregator Rotten Tomatoes, Spider-Man 3 holds a 62% approval rating based on 261 reviews, with an average rating of 6.5/10. The website's critics consensus reads, "Though there are more characters and plotlines, and the action sequences still dazzle, Spider-Man 3 nonetheless isn't quite as refined as the first two." Metacritic, which uses a weighted average, assigned the film a score of 59 out of 100 based on 40 critics, indicating "mixed or average" reviews. Audiences polled by CinemaScore gave the film an average grade of "B+" on an A+ to F scale.

Roger Friedman of Fox News called the film a "4-star opera", praising its humor and action. Jonathan Ross of BBC One felt Spider-Man 3 was the best film of the trilogy. Richard Corliss of Time commended the filmmakers for their ability to "dramatize feelings of angst and personal betrayal worthy of an Ingmar Bergman film, and then to dress them up in gaudy comic-book colors". Wesley Morris of The Boston Globe said Raimi "strikes an exquisite balance between pop and woe, drama and whooshing adventure". Jonathan Dean of Total Film described the film as "one huge action vehicle, slamming the accelerator down in pursuit of the Big Thrill. And consistently hitting the mark." Todd Gilchrist of IGN thought the film was a satisfying conclusion to the series.

Manohla Dargis of The New York Times felt the film lacked humor and that its pace was too slow. Richard Roeper of the Chicago Sun-Times also criticized the "sluggish" pace. Writing for New York magazine, David Edelstein thought that all three of the film's villains combined were not as compelling as Doctor Octopus in Spider-Man 2. James Berardinelli felt that Spider-Man 3 had too many villains. Roger Ebert thought the film was "a mess" with too many villains and subplots, and he criticized the fact that Sandman never expressed how he felt about his new powers. Writing in The New Yorker, Anthony Lane described the film as a "shambles". Robert Wilonsky of the Dallas Observer thought the film was overly long, with too many villains and uninspired plot points.

John Hartl of MSNBC and Amy Biancolli of the Houston Chronicle felt the film had too many storylines. Jack Matthews of New York Daily News thought the film too devoted to the "quiet conversations" of Peter and Mary Jane. Writing for LA Weekly, Scott Foundas called the film "lumbering" and "joyless". Sean Burns of Philadelphia Weekly felt that Raimi substituted the "warmth and wit" of the first two films in favor of "scope and scale".

== Accolades ==
Award	Date of ceremony	Category	Recipients	Result
Annie Awards	February 8, 2008	Best Animated Effects	Ryan Laney	Nominated
British Academy Film Awards	February 10, 2008	Best Special Visual Effects	Scott Stokdyk, Peter Nofz, Kee-Suk Ken Hahn, and Spencer Cook	Nominated
Kids' Choice Awards	March 29, 2008	Favorite Movie Actress	Kirsten Dunst	Nominated
Golden Trailer Awards	May 31, 2007	Best Summer Blockbuster	Spider-Man 3	Won
MTV Movie Award	June 1, 2008	Best Fight	James Franco and Tobey Maguire	Nominated
MTV Movie Award	June 1, 2008	Best Villain	Topher Grace	Nominated
National Movie Awards	September 27, 2007	Best Family Film	Spider-Man 3	Nominated
National Movie Awards	September 27, 2007	Best Performance by a Female	Kirsten Dunst	Nominated
National Movie Awards	September 27, 2007	Best Performance by a Male	Tobey Maguire	Nominated
People's Choice Awards	January 8, 2008	Favorite On Screen Match-up	Tobey Maguire and Kirsten Dunst	Nominated
People's Choice Awards	January 8, 2008	Favorite Threequel	Spider-Man	Nominated
Saturn Awards	June 24, 2008	Best Director	Sam Raimi	Nominated
Saturn Awards	June 24, 2008	Best Fantasy Film	Spider-Man 3	Nominated
Saturn Awards	June 24, 2008	Best Special Effects	Scott Stokdyk, Peter Nofz, Spencer Cook, and John Frazier	Nominated
Saturn Awards	June 24, 2008	Best Supporting Actor	James Franco	Nominated
Teen Choice Awards	August 26, 2007	Choice Action Movie Actor	Tobey Maguire	Nominated
Teen Choice Awards	August 26, 2007	Choice Action Movie Actress	Kirsten Dunst	Nominated
Teen Choice Awards	August 26, 2007	Choice Action Movie	Spider-Man 3	Nominated
Teen Choice Awards	August 26, 2007	Choice Movie Dance	Tobey Maguire	Nominated
Teen Choice Awards	August 26, 2007	Choice Movie Liplock	Tobey Maguire and Kirsten Dunst	Nominated
Teen Choice Awards	August 26, 2007	Choice Movie Rumble	Tobey Maguire and James Franco vs. Topher Grace and Thomas Haden Church	Nominated
Teen Choice Awards	August 26, 2007	Choice Movie Villain	Topher Grace	Nominated
Visual Effects Society Award	February 10, 2008	Best Single Visual Effect of the Year	Scott Stokdyk, Terry Clotiaux, Spencer Cook, and Douglas Bloom	Nominated
Visual Effects Society Award	February 10, 2008	Outstanding Animated Character in a Live Action Motion Picture	Chris Y. Yang, Bernd Angerer, Dominick Cecere, and Remington Scott	Nominated
Visual Effects Society Award	February 10, 2008	Outstanding Models or Miniatures in a Motion Picture	Ian Hunter, Scott Beverly, Forest P. Fischer, and Ray Moore	Nominated
Visual Effects Society Award	February 10, 2008	Outstanding Visual Effects in an Effects Driven Motion Picture	Scott Stokdyk, Terry Clotiaux, Peter Nofz, and Spencer Cook	Nominated

== Post-release ==
=== Cancelled sequels ===
In 2007, Spider-Man 4 entered development for release on May 6, 2011, with Raimi attached to direct and Maguire, Dunst, and other cast members set to reprise their roles. Both a fourth and a fifth film were planned, and at one time, the idea of shooting the two sequels concurrently was under consideration. However, Raimi said in March 2009 that only the fourth film was in development at that time. (Note: Attributed to multiple references:) Raimi had been unhappy with Spider-Man 3 and wanted to create a satisfying narrative to conclude the franchise. James Vanderbilt was hired in October 2007 to write the screenplay, which was rewritten by David Lindsay-Abaire in November 2008 and rewritten again by Gary Ross in October 2009. Sony also engaged Vanderbilt to write scripts for Spider-Man 5 and Spider-Man 6. A spin-off featuring Spider-Man 3's version of Venom was also planned; this film never materialized, although a Venom film featuring a different version of the character was eventually produced by Sony and released in 2018.

Sony announced in January 2010 that plans for Spider-Man 4 had been cancelled due to Raimi's withdrawal from the project. Raimi reportedly withdrew because he doubted he could meet the May 6, 2011 release date while maintaining the film's creative integrity. He reportedly went through four versions of the script with different screenwriters and could not arrive at a version he liked.

=== Reboot and unproduced films ===
A reboot of the series titled The Amazing Spider-Man was released on July 3, 2012, with Andrew Garfield as Peter Parker. A sequel, The Amazing Spider-Man 2, was released on May 2, 2014. Following the 2014 Sony Pictures hack, leaked information indicated that prior to the cancellation of future The Amazing Spider-Man films, Sony was in talks with Sam Raimi about having him direct Spider-Man vs. The Amazing Spider-Man, a multiversal crossover film featuring both Garfield's and Maguire's versions of Spider-Man, as well as a new film trilogy starring Maguire as a middle-aged Spider-Man years after the events of Spider-Man 3. These plans were ultimately scrapped.

=== Marvel Cinematic Universe ===
Following the underwhelming critical reception and commercial performance of The Amazing Spider-Man 2, Sony and Marvel Studios announced in February 2015 that a new version of Spider-Man would appear in the Marvel Cinematic Universe (MCU), debuting in Captain America: Civil War. As part of the agreement, Sony continued to finance, distribute, own and have final creative control over the Spider-Man films. (Note: Attributed to multiple references:) Sony subsequently released several MCU films starring Tom Holland as Spider-Man. Maguire, Dafoe and Haden Church reprised their respective roles from Spider-Man 3 in one of them, Spider-Man: No Way Home (2021), which uses the concept of the multiverse to link the MCU films with Raimi's Spider-Man film series and Marc Webb's Amazing Spider-Man films.

== See also ==
- Spider-Man in film

== Bibliography ==
- Peter David (March 2007). Spider-Man 3 (Mass Market Paperback). Novelization of the film. Pocket Star. ISBN 978-1-4165-2721-3.
- Grant Curtis (April 26, 2007). The Spider-Man Chronicles: The Art and Making of Spider-Man 3 (Hardcover). Chronicle Books. ISBN 978-0-8118-5777-2.
