= Norman Osborn (2002 film series character) =

Sam Raimi's Spider-Man film series and Marvel Cinematic Universe character

- Sam Raimi's Spider-Man and Marvel Cinematic Universe character
- Willem Dafoe as Norman Osborn / Green Goblin in Spider-Man (2002)
- First appearance: Spider-Man (2002)
- Last appearance: Spider-Man: No Way Home (2021)
- Based on: Norman Osborn by: Stan Lee; Steve Ditko
- Adapted by: David Koepp
- Portrayed by: Willem Dafoe
- Voiced by: Willem Dafoe (Note: Spider-Man (2002 video game)); Roger L. Jackson (Note: Spider-Man: Friend or Foe (2007 video game))

In-universe information
- Alias: Green Goblin
- Species: Human mutate
- Occupation: CEO of Oscorp; Scientist
- Weapon: Pumpkin bombs; Razor bats; Goblin armor; Goblin Glider
- Children: Harry Osborn (son)
- Origin: New York City, United States

Norman Virgil Osborn, also known by his alter ego the Green Goblin, or simply Goblin, is a fictional character portrayed by Willem Dafoe in Sam Raimi's Spider-Man film trilogy (2002—2007) and the Marvel Cinematic Universe (MCU) film Spider-Man: No Way Home (2021). Based on the Marvel Comics character of the same name, he is introduced in Spider-Man (2002) as a scientist and the CEO of Oscorp who tests an unstable performance-enhancing serum on himself, giving him superhuman strength and causing him to develop an insane alternate personality known as the Green Goblin. Using advanced Oscorp armor and equipment, the Goblin begins terrorizing New York City and comes into conflict with Spider-Man. In Spider-Man: No Way Home, a magical spell backfires and allows Osborn to travel through the multiverse and encounter different versions of Spider-Man.

== Concept and creation ==
The Green Goblin was originally a comic book character created by writer Stan Lee and artist Steve Ditko. He first appeared in The Amazing Spider-Man #14 (1964) as a character without a human identity like other Spider-Man villains. However, the comic suggested his identity would be revealed in the future, and at the end of The Amazing Spider-Man #39 (1966), the Goblin revealed himself as Norman Osborn. The Goblin became one of Spider-Man's most popular enemies during the 1960s and eventually died in the second part of "The Night Gwen Stacy Died" storyline (1973). The character resurfaced in The Clone Saga and has been adapted into other media beyond comics.

While rewriting Spider-Man from a "scriptment" by James Cameron, David Koepp made the Green Goblin the primary antagonist and Doctor Octopus the secondary villain. After Scott Rosenberg was brought in to rewrite Koepp's material, director Sam Raimi asked him to cut the Doctor Octopus storyline so the plot could focus on the surrogate father-son theme between Norman Osborn and Peter Parker, which had appeared in recent Ultimate Marvel comics.

== Portrayal ==
Nicolas Cage, Jason Isaacs, John Malkovich and Billy Bob Thornton were considered for the role of Osborn, but all turned it down. (Note: Attributed to multiple references:) Willem Dafoe had been seeking a role in an action film, and when he heard that Raimi was directing Spider-Man, he reached out to him. Dafoe was cast as Osborn in November 2000. He viewed Osborn as a complex character, and said he could relate to Osborn's "ambition and his desire for perfection and how that perverts so much of his relationship to people." Raimi gave Dafoe a copy of the novella Strange Case of Dr Jekyll and Mr Hyde to prepare for the role.

Willem Dafoe particularly enjoyed shooting a scene in which Osborn talks to his Goblin persona in a mirror.

While Dafoe enjoyed playing the Goblin persona, he found playing Osborn's human persona even more interesting, partly because the performance could switch from comedic to dramatic in a heartbeat. One way Dafoe differentiated the two personas was by wearing dental prosthetics while playing Osborn to give him straight teeth, while using his naturally crooked teeth when portraying the Goblin. Dafoe came up with the idea of reintroducing Osborn in Spider-Man 2 through a hallucination that haunts his son Harry. Dafoe compared this hallucination to the ghost of Hamlet's father. Dafoe portrayed the hallucinated Osborn in both Spider-Man 2 and Spider-Man 3 (2007). For Spider-Man: No Way Home, Dafoe was digitally de-aged so he would resemble the Osborn of Spider-Man. To prevent his involvement with the film being made public, Dafoe was required to wear a long cloak on set.

== Costume ==
In Spider-Man: No Way Home, Osborn appears both with and without the Goblin mask.

The first version of the Green Goblin mask designed for Spider-Man was created by Amalgamated Dynamics. It was animatronic, and allowed for the expression of a full range of emotions. Dafoe described it as a "silly looking" Halloween mask. It was ultimately scrapped due to technical problems and because it was deemed "too creepy" by studio executives. (Note: Attributed to multiple references:) Dafoe insisted on wearing the new, uncomfortable costume himself, as he felt a stuntman could not convey the character's necessary body language. The 580-piece suit took half an hour to put on. Dafoe wanted the costume to be flexible enough for him to do the splits; costume designer James Acheson said Dafoe was likely the most flexible actor he had ever worked with. In No Way Home, the Goblin costume was changed to make it more closely resemble the suit from the comics.

== Characterization ==
Adam Holmes of CinemaBlend described Osborn as a character with a split personality: Norman could present himself as normal to other people, before turning into the "unhinged" Goblin who kills without mercy. James Whitbrook of Gizmodo has drawn contrasts between Peter and Osborn regarding the ways they exercise power in the Raimi film series. According to Whitbrook, Peter learns that power comes with responsibilities, while Osborn is driven by a fear of losing power. When he is ousted from Oscorp, Osborn seeks a new type of power through the Goblin, attacking his former colleagues and the people he cares about, namely Harry and Peter, while descending into insanity.

== Appearances ==
=== Spider-Man (2002) ===
Norman Osborn, a scientist and the founder and CEO of Oscorp Industries, meets Peter Parker, the best friend of his son Harry, and is impressed by Peter's intelligence. At Oscorp, Osborn learns that some test subjects of a super-soldier serum project have gone insane, and that Oscorp may lose the chance for a military contract. Desperate, Osborn tests the serum on himself. It gives him enhanced strength and an alternate, deranged personality, which later comes to be known as the "Green Goblin". Osborn kills one of his scientists, then steals an Oscorp glider. He arrives at a test facility of Oscorp's rival, Quest Aerospace, where he kills scientists and military officials. After Oscorp's board of directors votes Osborn out as CEO, Osborn kills them, but retreats after being confronted by Spider-Man.

Osborn becomes horrified about what he has done as the Goblin, but is unable to overcome his alternate personality. In his search for Spider-Man, he attacks the Daily Bugle editor-in-chief J. Jonah Jameson, who employs Peter. Spider-Man arrives and is kidnapped by Osborn, who offers him a partnership. During a subsequent encounter, Spider-Man fights Osborn and refuses his offer.

Once Osborn deduces that Peter is Spider-Man, he attacks Peter's aunt May. He then kidnaps Peter's love interest Mary Jane Watson, as well as a Roosevelt Island Tramway car full of children. After Peter saves everyone, Osborn takes him to an abandoned building and brutally beats him. When Osborn threatens to kill Mary Jane, Peter finds the strength to fight back and gains the upper hand. Osborn then reveals his true identity and begs for mercy. While Peter is distracted, Osborn attempts to impale him with his glider, but Peter dodges the attack and the glider skewers Osborn instead. Before dying, Osborn begs Peter not to tell Harry that he is the Goblin.

=== Spider-Man 2 (2004) and Spider-Man 3 (2007) ===
In both films, Harry Osborn is haunted by a hallucination of his dead father demanding to be avenged.

=== Spider-Man: No Way Home (2021) ===
Osborn arrives in a parallel universe after Dr. Stephen Strange casts a magical spell which backfires. Seeking to banish his Green Goblin persona, Osborn breaks the Goblin mask in an alley and seeks refuge in a community center, where he meets May Parker and a new version of Peter Parker, dubbed "Peter-One". Osborn goes with Peter-One to the New York Sanctum, where he learns about the multiverse and encounters other villains from previous Spider-Man films. Dr. Strange imprisons Osborn and prepares to use a magical device to send him and the others back to their original timelines; if Osborn is sent back, he will die in a fight with Spider-Man.

Peter-One traps Strange in the Mirror Dimension and takes the villains to Happy Hogan's apartment, where he intends to cure them of their afflictions. However, Osborn succumbs to the Goblin and he fights with Peter-One. Osborn summons his glider and blows up the apartment building, fatally wounding May before he flees.

The other villains are cured by Peter-One and two other Peter Parkers from other universes. Osborn destroys Strange's device, which causes the barriers between universes to break. As Strange tries to seal them, Peter-One defeats and nearly kills Osborn, but is stopped by the Peter of Osborn's universe, "Peter-Two". Osborn stabs Peter-Two in the back (but not fatally), before Peter-One injects Osborn with a serum that cures him of his Goblin persona. Osborn is horrified when he sees Peter-Two lying on the ground. Strange casts a spell that returns Osborn, the other villains, and the other Peters to their respective universes, giving Osborn a second chance at life.

=== Video games ===
Dafoe reprises his role from Spider-Man in the 2002 video game adaptation of the film. The game Spider-Man: Friend or Foe (2007) explores an alternate timeline in which the Spider-Man film villains survived their deaths. Osborn is voiced by Roger L. Jackson and is a playable character in the game.

== Reception ==
=== Critical response ===
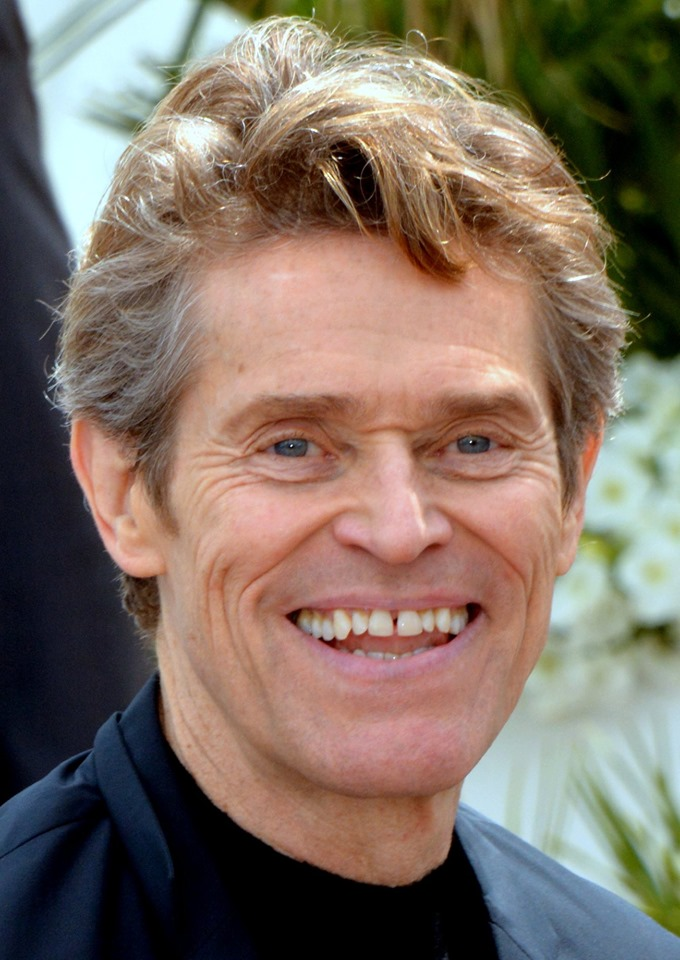
Willem Dafoe at the Cannes Film Festival in 2019

Following the 2002 release of Spider-Man, Jack Mathews of New York Daily News felt Dafoe put the "scare in archvillain", while Peter Bradshaw of The Guardian thought Dafoe created a strong supporting character. Conversely, A. O. Scott of The New York Times called Dafoe's performance in Spider-Man "uninspired and secondhand", while IGN's Richard George described the Goblin's armor and helmet as "not frightening" and "almost comically bad". In retrospective articles looking back at the Raimi trilogy before the release of Spider-Man: No Way Home, Steven Scaife of Vice called Dafoe's Goblin the ideal superhero villain, while Tom Chapman of Radio Times called him the best film supervillain of all time.

Brett Price of the Ohio student newspaper The Lantern praised Dafoe's performance as being "on another level" in No Way Home. Price felt that Dafoe's ability to portray the character without the mask made him even more intimidating than he was in Spider-Man. Amelia Emberwing of IGN and Peter Travers of Good Morning America applauded Dafoe's performance in No Way Home, with Travers calling it "delicious". Adam Rosenberg of Mashable called Dafoe's Goblin the best Spider-Man villain. He said that Dafoe's portrayal of the Goblin was central to the success of Spider-Man, and that the "emotional journey" of No Way Home relies heavily on Dafoe as well. Carrie Wittmer of Rolling Stone said that Osborn's return to his Goblin persona late in No Way Home is "peak camp" and one of the film's best moments. She said Dafoe's performance illustrates that he is "one of the best actors we have, in this or any universe." Osborn's line "you know, I'm something of a scientist myself", which he utters in both Spider-Man and in No Way Home, became an Internet meme. (Note: Attributed to multiple references:)

=== Accolades ===
Dafoe has received several nominations, mostly in a "Best Villain" category, for his portrayal of Osborn. His only win was a Critics' Choice Super Award in 2022 for his No Way Home performance. For years, Dafoe and Maguire held the Guinness World Record for "the longest career as a live-action Marvel character."

Year	Film	Award	Category	Recipient(s)	Result	Ref(s)
2003	Spider-Man	MTV Movie Awards	Best Villain	Willem Dafoe	Nominated	
2003	Spider-Man	MTV Movie Awards	Best Fight	Willem Dafoe (Note: Shared with Tobey Maguire)	Nominated	
2022	Spider-Man: No Way Home	Seattle Film Critics Society	Villain of the Year	Willem Dafoe	Nominated	
2022	Spider-Man: No Way Home	Critics' Choice Super Awards	Best Villain in a Movie	Willem Dafoe	Won	
2022	Spider-Man: No Way Home	MTV Movie & TV Awards	Best Villain	Willem Dafoe	Nominated	
