= J. Jonah Jameson (2002 film series character) =

2002–2007 Spider-Man film series character

- Sam Raimi's Spider-Man character
- J. K. Simmons as J. Jonah Jameson in Sam Raimi's Spider-Man 3 (2007).
- First appearance: Spider-Man (2002)
- Based on: J. Jonah Jameson by: Stan Lee; Steve Ditko
- Adapted by: David Koepp; Sam Raimi
- Portrayed by: J. K. Simmons
- Voiced by: Keith Carradine (Spider-Man: The New Animated Series); Jay Gordon (SM and SM2 film games); J. K. Simmons (SM3 film game)

In-universe information
- Full name: John Jonah Jameson Jr.
- Occupation: Chief of the Daily Bugle
- Spouse: Julia Jameson
- Children: John Jameson
- Nationality: American

J. Jonah Jameson (JJJ) is a fictional character portrayed by J. K. Simmons in Sam Raimi's Spider-Man trilogy. Based on the Marvel Comics character by Stan Lee and Steve Ditko, he was adapted to screen by David Koepp and Sam Raimi.

Jameson is the head editor-in-chief for the newspaper agency The Daily Bugle in New York City. He is introduced as a blustering, grumpy, loudmouthed individual who retains an extreme distaste for the emerging vigilante Spider-Man, and takes significant pride in carrying out an unrelenting smear campaign against him and driving a rift in public opinion on his heroics. Jameson eventually hires struggling high school student Peter Parker as a freelance photographer, as he remained the sole person able to capture clear photos of Spider-Man for the newspaper, unaware that Parker and Spider-Man are one and the same. He later hires Eddie Brock to expose a perceived history of Spider-Man's criminal activity, only to reluctantly fire Brock and retract his photos upon the revelation they were doctored from similar pictures taken by Parker himself.

Originally appearing in Spider-Man (2002) and its sequels Spider-Man 2 (2004) and Spider-Man 3 (2007), Simmons' portrayal has been universally praised and as a result, he voiced the character in a video game film tie-in, multiple television series and specials including recurring appearances on Robot Chicken, Ultimate Spider-Man, Avengers Assemble, Hulk and the Agents of S.M.A.S.H., and Lego Marvel Super Heroes: Maximum Overload, as well as guest roles on The Avengers: Earth's Mightiest Heroes and The Simpsons. He also portrayed an alternate universe version of the character in the Marvel Cinematic Universe films Spider-Man: Far From Home (2019) and Spider-Man: No Way Home (2021) and the web series The Daily Bugle (2019–2022), as well as the Sony's Spider-Man Universe (SSU) film Venom: Let There Be Carnage (2021), in addition to voicing alternate reality versions of the character in Spider-Man: Across the Spider-Verse (2023).

== Creation and characterization ==
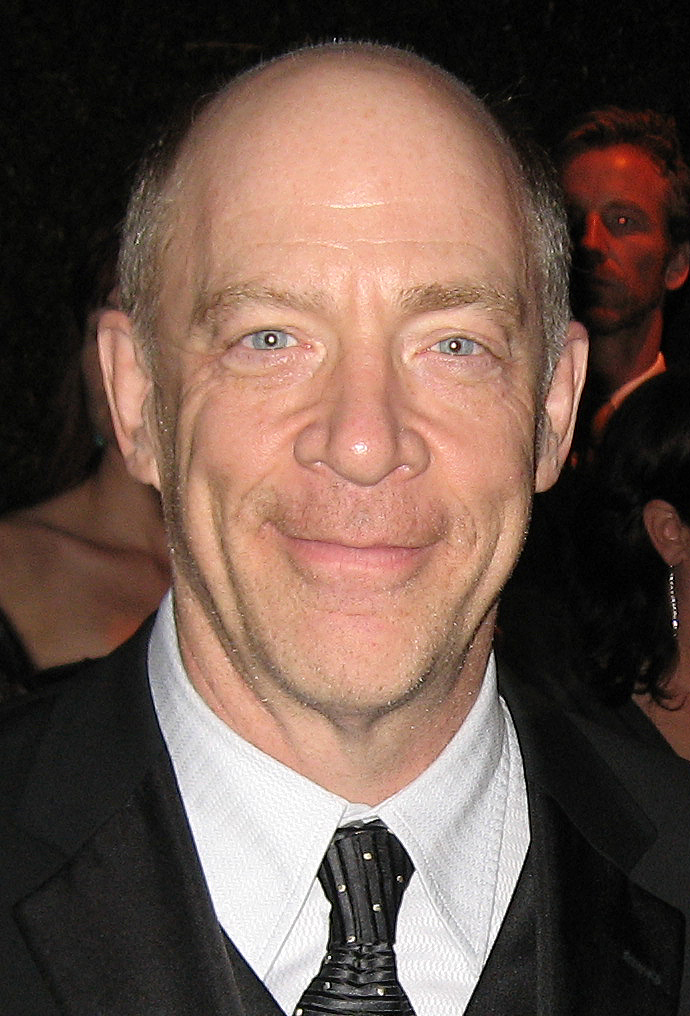
J. K. Simmons in 2009

J. Jonah Jameson first premiered as a comic book character in the comic book The Amazing Spider-Man issue No. 1 (March 1963). Stan Lee stated in an interview on Talk of the Nation that he modeled J. Jonah Jameson as a much grumpier version of himself. Later Spider-Man writers Tom DeFalco and Gerry Conway agreed that J. Jonah Jameson was as close as Lee ever came to a self-portrayal, with Conway elaborating that "just like Stan is a very complex and interesting guy who both has a tremendously charismatic part of himself and is an honestly decent guy who cares about people, he also has this incredible ability to go immediately to shallow. Just, BOOM, right to shallow. And that's Jameson". Conway stated that whenever he wrote Jameson's dialogue, he would hear it in Lee's voice, and on one occasion even wrote a Jameson speech that was almost directly quoted from a Stan Lee speech.

A live-action series, The Amazing Spider-Man featured J. Jonah Jameson as a recurring character, portrayed by David White in the pilot film and by Robert F. Simon for the remainder of the series and the films Spider-Man Strikes Back and Spider-Man: The Dragon's Challenge. Produced by Columbia Pictures Television, it aired from 1977 to 1979.

=== Sam Raimi film series ===
In 1998, Sony Pictures Entertainment acquired the film and television rights to Spider-Man also including 900 characters related to the character. It is perpetual provided that Sony releases a new Spider-Man film at least once every 5.75 years. The character was featured in a trilogy of live-action films directed by Sam Raimi with J. K. Simmons portraying the role of J. Jonah Jameson, with installments released from 2002 to 2007. The character served as a major source of comic relief throughout the series. Portrayed as a blustering, bombastic, obsessed, hyperactive man, this version of Jameson retains his dislike for Spider-Man and takes delight in anything that might discredit or defame him, but remains a good man at his core. Stan Lee was jealous upon learning of Simmons's casting that he had not been offered the role of the character he had based upon himself, but he ultimately approved of Simmons's performance.

=== In other films ===
In April 2014, Simmons expressed interest in reprising his role as J. Jonah Jameson in Marc Webb's The Amazing Spider-Man series should the studio offer him the role. For The Amazing Spider-Man 2 (2014), a scene was written and storyboarded but never filmed for Simmons to cameo as Jameson, seeing Jameson and Robbie Robertson appear in The Daily Bugle building during Spider-Man and Electro's final showdown, the hero and villain crashing through the walls and wrecking the office, much to Jameson's loud disdain. While Jameson does not physically appear in the final film, it is shown that Peter Parker is working for him by providing him with photographs of Spider-Man, and that Jameson is still slandering him via text messages and Tumblr.

Simmons briefly reprises his role as an alternate universe version of J. Jonah Jameson in the live-action MCU film Spider-Man: Far From Home (2019). This makes Simmons the first MCU character to be reprise a role from a different Marvel franchise. This J. Jonah Jameson appears as the host of TheDailyBugle.net, a sensationalist "InfoWars-type video platform." Director Jon Watts noted that Simmons' performance was over-the-top in Raimi's films, but now that same performance has real-world comparisons, such as Alex Jones. Simmons further portrayed the character in the Sony's Spider-Man Universe (SSU) films Venom: Let There Be Carnage (2021) and Morbius (2022; in a deleted scene), and in a supporting role in Spider-Man: No Way Home (2021).

Simmons also voiced several versions of the character in the animated film Spider-Man: Across the Spider-Verse.

== Fictional character biography ==
=== Campaign against Spider-Man ===
J. Jonah Jameson is the editor-in-chief of the Daily Bugle, with a personal disliking of the vigilante Spider-Man, considering him a "menace". He hires Peter Parker as a freelance photographer due to Parker taking clear photos of the vigilante, leading to the Bugle's sales getting higher due to Spider-Man. Jameson is also shown to have a cynical, obnoxious attitude and brusque manner with his staff, though he willingly protects Parker when the Green Goblin demands to know the identity of Spider-Man's photographer.

=== Spider-Man's retirement and return ===
Two years later, Jameson admits that Spider-Man is a hero, but refuses to talk openly about it. After Spider-Man disappears, a garbage man (Note: Identified in the novelisation as Namor McKenzie.) finds his suit and sells it to Jameson, who believes he successfully convinced Spider-Man to quit, publicly announcing it in his newspaper, and putting on the abandoned Spidey suit and cosplaying as Spider-Man behind closed doors. However, after crime and danger is noted as subsequently on the rise and his son John's fiancée, Mary Jane Watson, is kidnapped by Doctor Octopus, Jameson publicly admits to his staff that Spider-Man is a hero, but once the vigilante returns, taking his suit back from Jameson's office, he recants his statements. After Mary Jane is rescued by Spider-Man, at the wedding of his son John, Mary Jane leaves John at the altar, to which Jameson (having paid for the wedding) asks his wife to get a refund on the food.

=== Hiring Eddie Brock ===
One year later, now taking heart medication for stress, Jameson orders Parker and new hire Eddie Brock to obtain a photograph of Spider-Man proving his true criminal nature in exchange for earning a secure staff job in place of their usual freelance work, which Brock seemingly obtains. After Parker exposes Brock as having doctored his photo from one of Parker's own, Jameson immediately fires him and has the newspaper print their first retraction in 20 years. During a subsequent fight between the symbiote Venom and the Sandman against Spider-Man and the New Goblin, Jameson, unable to locate Parker, reluctantly buys a camera from a little girl in the surrounding crowd for $100. After Jameson attempts to take a photograph of the battle, he finds that the camera contains no film, which the smiling little girl says will cost "extra", infuriating Jameson.

== In other media ==
=== Television ===
Keith Carradine voiced the character in Spider-Man: The New Animated Series (2003), an alternate sequel to Raimi's original film that is considerably more dark and gritty than previous Spider-Man adaptations.

=== Film ===
- An alternate Jameson appears in the Marvel Cinematic Universe, depicted as the bald executive reporter of the sensationalist news website TheDailyBugle.net, intent on similarly defaming Spider-Man after his civilian persona is exposed through the use of doctored footage provided by an associate of the supervillain Mysterio. He eventually hires Betty Brant, one of Parker's classmates from the Midtown School of Science and Technology, as an unpaid intern to aid his ongoing efforts to expose the vigilante along with Ned Leeds and MJ who were involved.He is later contacted by Parker himself in an attempt to lure several displaced villains from the multiverse to the Statue of Liberty to cure and return them to their respective realities, before completely losing memory of Parker alongside the rest of the world as a result of a magic spell cast by Doctor Strange. He appears in the Marvel Cinematic Universe films Spider-Man: Far From Home (2019) and Spider-Man: No Way Home (2021).
- In the mid-credits scene of the Sony's Spider-Man Universe (SSU) film Venom: Let There Be Carnage (2021), Eddie Brock and Venom are teleported from their universe into the MCU as a result of Dr. Stephen Strange's first spell in No Way Home. In the scene, Brock and Venom watch a broadcast of Jameson (Simmons reprising his role) that focuses on Spider-Man's identity.
- Simmons filmed a cameo role as J. Jonah Jameson for the SSU film Morbius (2022), which was cut from the film following its delay to after the release of Spider-Man: No Way Home (2021).
- Simmons lends his voice to multiple versions of J. Jonah Jameson in the Sony Pictures Animation film Spider-Man: Across the Spider-Verse (2023), portraying Jameson as he appears on Earth-1610 (home of Miles Morales), Earth-65 (home of Gwen Stacy / Spider-Woman), and Earth-42 (a reality where Spider-Man doesn't exist and Miles instead became the Prowler), all designed after the bald MCU version of the character. Archive audio of Simmons from Spider-Man (2002) is also used to represent the Jameson of Earth-13122 (home of Lego Spider-Man). Simmons will reprise the role again in Spider-Man: Beyond the Spider-Verse (2027).

=== Video games ===
- Jay Gordon voices the character in the first two Raimi films' video game adaptations, Spider-Man (2002, Xbox) and Spider-Man 2 (2004). Simmons reprises the role in the PSP version of Spider-Man 2.
- Simmons fully reprises his role from the films in the video game adaptation of Spider-Man 3 (2007), replacing Gordon.
- Spider-Man pinball, a game based on the Raimi trilogy, features new audio lines of Simmons as Jameson.

== See also ==
- Characters of the Marvel Cinematic Universe
