= Spider-Man 2 (2004 video game) =

2004 video game

- Developers: Treyarch (GC, PS2, Xbox); Digital Eclipse (GBA, N-Gage); The Fizz Factor (Windows) (Note: Ported to Mac OS X by icculus.org); Vicarious Visions (DS, PSP)
- Publisher: Activision (Note: In Japan, Taito published the PlayStation 2 and Nintendo DS versions with the PSP version by Konami. The Mac OS X version was published by Aspyr.)
- Director: Tomo Moriwaki
- Producers: Jeremiah Maza; Jonathan Zamkoff; Nick Doran
- Designer: Akihiro Akaike
- Writer: Matthew B. Rhoades
- Composers: KMFDM; Michael McCuistion
- Series: Spider-Man
- Engine: Unreal Engine 2 (PC)
- Platforms: Game Boy Advance; GameCube; PlayStation 2; Windows; Xbox; N-Gage; Mac OS X; Nintendo DS; PlayStation Portable
- Release: June 29, 2004: Game Boy Advance, GameCube, PlayStation 2, Windows, Xbox; NA: June 29, 2004; AU: July 2, 2004; EU: July 9, 2004; N-Gage; EU: July 2, 2004; NA: July 6, 2004; Mac OS X; NA: August 16, 2004; EU: 2004; Nintendo DS; NA: November 17, 2004; AU: February 24, 2005; EU: March 11, 2005; PlayStation Portable; NA: March 23, 2005; PAL: September 1, 2005
- Genre: Action-adventure
- Mode: Single-player

Spider-Man 2 is a 2004 action-adventure game based on the 2004 film of the same name. The game is the sequel to 2002's Spider-Man, itself based on the 2002 film of the same name. It was released on June 29, 2004, for the PlayStation 2, GameCube, Xbox, Microsoft Windows, and Game Boy Advance, followed by N-Gage and Nintendo DS versions later the same year. A PlayStation Portable version was released almost one year later, on March 23, 2005. The Game Boy Advance version, developed by Digital Eclipse, was re-released on a twin pack cartridge and bundled with that system's version of the 2002 Spider-Man game in 2005. A tie-in game, titled Spider-Man 2: Activity Center, was also released in June 2004. Published by Activision, the console versions were developed by Treyarch, while the others had different developers and are drastically different as a result.

All game versions closely follow the film's plot, but expand upon it by including scenes and characters that do not appear in the film. Set 2 years after the events of Spider-Man, the game finds Peter Parker struggling to manage both his personal life and his duties as Spider-Man. When scientist and Peter's mentor, Otto Octavius, becomes the diabolical villain Doctor Octopus after an accident, Spider-Man must stop him from recreating a dangerous fusion power experiment.

The game's console versions were positively received, with critics commending the realistic Manhattan setting and web-swinging mechanics. The handheld versions received mixed reviews, while the PC version received negative reviews. The game was followed by Spider-Man 3, itself based on the 2007 film of the same name.

== Gameplay ==
The console version of Spider-Man 2 is a third-person action-adventure video game, set in an open world based on New York City and composed of Manhattan, Roosevelt Island, Ellis Island, and Liberty Island. Players take on the role of Spider-Man and complete missions—linear scenarios with set objectives—to progress through the story.

The story is divided into multiple chapters, each with its objectives, such as purchasing upgrades for Spider-Man or acquiring a certain number of hero points from completing side missions. Pedestrians across the game's map give these side missions. They mainly consist of battling criminals, stopping speeding cars by jumping on top of them and punching them, taking injured people to the hospital, or saving construction workers from falling to their deaths. Each chapter includes at least one story mission related to the main plot.

Players can web swing, crawl walls, and fight enemies using a variety of combos. They can use Spider-Man's "spider sense" to slow down time and dodge incoming attacks, including gunfire. This game version was considered innovative due to its physics-based algorithms that simulate Spider-Man's web swinging in 3D, creating a new game mechanic unlike previous Spider-Man games' traditional jumping or flying. Combat is far more complex, as it involves carefully timing the player's attacks and dodges. After completing the main storyline, a bonus mode inside a warehouse is unlocked, where the player can fight waves of enemies and bosses from the main storyline, as well as an exclusive villain: Calypso.

=== Microsoft Windows ===
The Windows version of Spider-Man 2 is a level-based beat 'em up. The player can use several combos and web-based attacks to fight enemies, as well as a power move that causes Spider-Man's fists to glow and deal extra damage; it is charged up by defeating enemies. In addition to wall crawling, web swinging is featured in the outdoor levels, though the player can only attach webs to glowing orbs that float in the sky.

=== PSP ===
The PSP version of Spider-Man 2 uses the same engine as 2002's Spider-Man. Because of this, the gameplay is virtually unchanged, and many locations from the first game are reused, as is its scoring system, which assigns players a score at the end of each level based on various factors, such as the time taken to complete the level and the number of combos used. The player can crawl walls and web swing, though Spider-Man can only move forward in a straight line. They can also lock their camera onto certain enemies and web them.

== Plot ==
=== Console version ===
2 years after the events of the first game, Peter Parker is struggling to balance his civilian life with his duties as Spider-Man. This dramatically affects his personal life, as he is frequently late or absent for school and leisure time with his friends: his crush, Mary Jane Watson, and best friend Harry Osborn, who blames Spider-Man for his father's death. While stopping a museum robbery, Spider-Man encounters the cat burglar Black Cat, who manages to escape from him. Black Cat later returns and befriends Spider-Man, helping him fight crime several times.

Spider-Man defeats the supervillain Rhino and is challenged by SFX artist Quentin Beck to partake in a series of "games" meant to prove he is a fraud. After Spider-Man prevails, an embarrassed Beck assumes the identity of "Mysterio" and leads attacks on both an opera and the Statue of Liberty, which Spider-Man foils. He then finds Mysterio's hideout and overcomes another series of challenges, learning that Mysterio is a fraud in the process. However, he is unable to capture him because Mysterio uses illusions.

Harry introduces Peter to Otto Octavius, a nuclear scientist who is trying to make a fusion power experiment, sponsored by Oscorp, which would provide an unlimited power source to Manhattan. Octavius befriends and begins to mentor Peter throughout their subsequent meetings. While handling hazardous materials, Octavius wears a harness of robotic tentacle arms with artificial intelligence. During a public demonstration Peter and Harry attended, a power spike caused the fusion reactor to destabilize. Octavius refuses to shut down the reactor, which goes critical, killing his wife and burning his AI inhibitor chip. Peter, as Spider-Man, shuts the experiment down, destroying it in the process. Later, the arms' AI begins to influence Octavius negatively, and he becomes the villain Doctor Octopus after a confrontation with his former friend and colleague, Curt Connors. Blaming Spider-Man for what happened to him, Octavius becomes determined to retry his experiment and robs a bank to fund it. Coincidentally, Peter is there with his Aunt May, so he suits up as Spider-Man and fights Octavius. Octavius takes May hostage, forcing Spider-Man to rescue her while Octavius escapes with the stolen money.

Spider-Man later learns that Mary Jane is getting married to John Jameson and reunites with Black Cat, who tries to convince him to give up on his civilian life to be Spider-Man full-time. The pair then works together to track down the Shocker, who escaped from prison during Beck's initial competition with Spider-Man. They defeat him, but Shocker escapes after injuring Black Cat. Later, Spider-Man stops Mysterio from robbing a convenience store and unmasks him as Beck before taking photos of him for the Daily Bugle. Publisher J. Jonah Jameson uses the photos to make it look like Spider-Man and Mysterio were in cahoots; Peter decides to confront Jameson as Spider-Man but is stopped by Black Cat, who informs him of Shocker's return. After capturing Shocker, Spider-Man tells Black Cat that he must continue living a double life, which she understands, before parting ways.

Requiring the isotope tritium to fuel his reactor, Octavius visits Harry to demand it, who agrees to help in exchange for Spider-Man. Harry tells Octavius to seek Peter, who he believes is friends with the hero. Octavius locates Peter, tells him to find Spider-Man, and kidnaps Mary Jane. Spider-Man confronts Octavius and battles him atop a New York City Subway train. Octavius sabotages the controls and leaves Spider-Man to save the passengers, which he does at a tremendous physical toll. Spider-Man falls unconscious, allowing Octavius to deliver him to Harry. As Octavius leaves with the tritium, Harry prepares to kill Spider-Man, only to be shocked to see Peter under the mask. Peter convinces Harry to direct him to Octavius' lair, as bigger things are at stake. As Peter arrives at Octavius's waterfront laboratory and attempts to rescue Mary Jane discreetly, Octavius discovers him, and they battle while the nuclear reaction swells. Peter ultimately subdues Octavius, reveals his identity, and helps him return to his senses. Realizing the error of his ways, Octavius sacrifices himself to destroy the fusion reactor, while Spider-Man rescues Mary Jane, who is now aware of his secret identity.

Mary Jane abandons John at the altar on her wedding day and runs to Peter's apartment. She confesses her feelings for him and says she will fully support his double life. As they hear police sirens in the distance, Mary Jane encourages Peter to go help as Spider-Man.

=== Microsoft Windows ===
Nuclear scientist Otto Octavius attempts to make a fusion power experiment, sponsored by Oscorp, that would provide an unlimited source of energy to Manhattan. While handling hazardous materials, Octavius wears a harness of powerful robot tentacle arms with artificial intelligence. During a public demonstration that Peter Parker and Harry Osborn are attending, a power spike causes the fusion reactor to destabilize. Octavius refuses to shut down the reactor, which goes critical, killing his wife and burning the inhibitor chip blocking the arms from his nervous system. Peter, as Spider-Man, shuts the experiment down, destroying it in the process. Later, the arms' AI begins to influence Octavius, and he becomes the villain Doctor Octopus, seeking to complete his work at all costs.

While patrolling the city, Spider-Man spots a van being chased by the police and follows it to the prison, where a riot breaks out. He defeats some of the escaped inmates before Rhino bursts out of jail and attempts to escape, only to become caught in a laser cage set up by the police. Spider-Man fights Rhino, who manages to escape from the cage, but rams into a gas station, causing an explosion that knocks him out. Spider-Man puts out the flames while Octavius retrieves the unconscious Rhino. Later, Octavius attempts to rob a bank to fund a second experiment. Coincidentally, Peter is there with Aunt May, suits up as Spider-Man, and fights Octavius inside the vault. Octavius takes May hostage, forcing Spider-Man to rescue her while Octavius escapes with the stolen money.

Sometime later, as Peter is walking through the city with his friend and crush, Mary Jane Watson, someone steals the latter's car. After telling Mary Jane to wait while he calls the police, Peter, as Spider-Man, follows the carjacker to a warehouse, where he is confronted by the villain Puma. Spider-Man defeats Puma's goons before engaging him in a battle across the city that culminates at a construction site. Puma reveals that Octavius hired him to keep Spider-Man distracted while he kidnaps Mary Jane, then attempts to escape, but Spider-Man captures him. Later, Octavius attacks Oscorp to steal the equipment he needs to complete his fusion reactor. Spider-Man arrives to stop him and must disarm several bombs that Octavius has planted around the building before confronting him. Octavius escapes with the device while Spider-Man is attacked by Rhino, whom he manages to defeat by freezing him with liquid nitrogen. Spider-Man then attempts to pursue Octavius, only to be confronted by the villain Mysterio, who creates the illusion of a floating city.

After defeating Mysterio, he tells Spider-Man where to find Octavius, and then he vanishes, revealing that he is also an illusion. Arriving at the subway station, Spider-Man battles Octavius' henchmen before fighting Octavius himself on top of a New York City Subway train. Octavius sabotages the controls, causing the train to derail, and escapes. Still, Spider-Man follows him to his waterfront laboratory, where Octavius attempts to recreate his experiment and keeps Mary Jane hostage. Spider-Man discreetly tries to rescue Mary Jane, but Octavius discovers him, and they battle. As the nuclear reaction swells, Spider-Man defeats Octavius and helps him return to his senses. Realizing the error of his ways, Octavius sacrifices himself to destroy the fusion reactor while Spider-Man rescues Mary Jane.

=== PSP ===
While patrolling the city one day, Spider-Man spots several thugs attempting to rob a bank and stops them. Later that night, after having dinner with his friends Mary Jane Watson (for whom he has hidden feelings) and Harry Osborn (who despises Spider-Man, blaming him for his father's death), Peter spots a van being chased by the police and follows it to the Queensboro Bridge, where the chase has led to a massive traffic accident. As Spider-Man, he rescues several endangered civilians and cops before following the van to a warehouse, where he finds thugs unloading explosives. While fighting the thugs, the explosives provoke a massive fire, but Spider-Man puts out the flames and deals with the remaining crooks.

Later, Harry introduces Peter to Otto Octavius, a nuclear scientist who is trying to make a fusion power experiment, sponsored by Oscorp, which would provide an unlimited power source to Manhattan. Octavius quickly befriends and begins to mentor Peter. While handling hazardous materials, Octavius wears a harness of robotic tentacle arms with artificial intelligence. During a public demonstration Peter and Harry attended, a power spike caused the fusion reactor to destabilize. Octavius refuses to shut down the reactor, which goes critical, killing his wife and burning the inhibitor chip blocking the arms from his nervous system. Peter, as Spider-Man, shuts the experiment down, destroying it in the process. Later, the arms' AI begins to influence Octavius, and he becomes the villain Doctor Octopus, seeking to complete his work at all costs.

Peter later learns that a prison riot has allowed several supervillains to escape, and is tasked by his boss, J. Jonah Jameson, with taking photos of a gala at the Wax Museum. When he arrives, he discovers that Mysterio, one of the escaped villains, is holding everyone in attendance hostage. He infiltrates the museum as Spider-Man to rescue the hostages and defeat Mysterio. The next day, Octavius attempts to rob a bank to fund a second experiment. Peter, who is coincidentally there with his Aunt May, suits up as Spider-Man and fights Octavius inside the vault. After a chase through the city, Octavius escapes with the stolen money.

After foiling a bomb threat orchestrated by the Vulture, another escaped villain, Spider-Man learns from him that the Shocker has also escaped and is planning a job at a warehouse. Spider-Man goes there and discovers that Shocker has teamed up with Rhino, who broke him and the other villains out of prison. Spider-Man manages to defeat the two villains and leaves them for the police. Before Spider-Man departs, Shocker reveals that Octavius hired him and Rhino to steal some high-tech equipment from the government, which Spider-Man deduces that Octavius needs for his fusion reactor.

Requiring the isotope tritium to fuel his reactor, Octavius visits Harry to demand it, who agrees to help in exchange for Spider-Man. Harry tells Octavius to seek Peter, who he believes is friends with the hero. Octavius locates Peter, tells him to find Spider-Man, and kidnaps Mary Jane. Spider-Man confronts Octavius and battles him atop a New York City Subway train. Octavius sabotages the controls and leaves Spider-Man to save the passengers, which he does at a tremendous physical toll. Spider-Man falls unconscious, allowing Octavius to deliver him to Harry. As Octavius leaves with the tritium, Harry prepares to kill Spider-Man, only to be shocked to see Peter under the mask. Peter convinces Harry to direct him to Octavius' lair, as bigger things are at stake. As Peter arrives at Octavius's waterfront laboratory and attempts to rescue Mary Jane discreetly, Octavius discovers him, and they battle while the nuclear reaction swells. Peter ultimately subdues Octavius, reveals his identity, and helps him return to his senses. Realizing the error of his ways, Octavius sacrifices himself to destroy the fusion reactor, while Spider-Man rescues Mary Jane, who is now aware of his secret identity.

Mary Jane abandons her fiancé at the altar on her wedding day and runs to Peter's apartment. She confesses her feelings for him and says she will fully support his double life. As they hear police sirens in the distance, Mary Jane encourages Peter to help as Spider-Man.

== Development and release ==
Development on Spider-Man 2 began at Treyarch shortly after the financial success of 2002's Spider-Man. The physics-based web swinging system was conceived by designer Jamie Fristrom, who was dissatisfied with the web swinging system of the first game, which he was on the development team for, and desired a "more realistic" swinging system in the follow-up. He cited the game Rocket Jockey as an inspiration. Although the concept was initially difficult to prototype due to the work involved in manually adding points into the game that web lines could be attached to, Fristrom and programmer Andrei Pokrovsky implemented ray casting into the game as a solution to automatically map infinite points where players could attach webs to swing from. Fristrom demonstrated the web-swinging system to Activision executives, including company COO Ron Doornink, who approved the system for use in the game. The open world design of the game was influenced by Grand Theft Auto III. The game was developed by a team of 86 people.

Spider-Man 2 featured a semi-original story loosely based on the film. This was decided after the development team received a copy of the film's shooting script, and came to the consensus that a straightforward adaptation of its narrative would be a poor fit for a video game. Thus, the developers opted to include characters from Spider-Man's extended rogues' gallery that had not been featured in the film, resulting in Mysterio's inclusion in the game, in part as a homage to Spider-Man vs. The Kingpin, which directly inspired the game's "funhouse" level.

The developers at Treyarch were forced to cut a large amount of content from the game to complete it on time and release it at the same time as the film, scrapping the planned bosses Lizard, Scorpion, Kraven the Hunter, and Calypso and an explorative giant sewer system. Calypso was kept in as an optional post-game boss, and all four villains would be incorporated into the game's sequel, Spider-Man 3 (although Scorpion and Calypso would be next-generation console exclusives).

Spider-Man 2 was first released in 2004 in North America on June 29 for PlayStation 2, GameCube, Xbox, Windows, and Game Boy Advance, with Australia and Europe receiving the game on July 2 and July 9, respectively. Treyarch exclusively handled the console variants using their proprietary Next-Generation Libraries (NGL) engine while Digital Eclipse developed the Game Boy Advance version. The Fizz Factor developed an entirely separate youth-oriented version of the title for Windows, which was subsequently ported to Mac OS X by developer Ryan "icculus" Gordon, with Aspyr handling publishing duties. The port shipped to stores in North America on August 16, 2004, and reached store shelves on August 20. Also developed by Digital Eclipse, another distinct version was released for N-Gage in Europe on July 2, 2004, and in North America the following week on July 6.

Developed by Vicarious Visions, two distinct iterations of the title were released for Nintendo DS and PlayStation Portable as launch titles. The DS version shipped in North America on November 17, four days before the launch of the system in North America, and released as a day one launch title in Australia and Europe the following year on February 24 and March 11, respectively. The PlayStation Portable version released on March 23, 2005, one day before the official launch of the system in North America, and was similarly made available in Europe and Australia as a day one launch title on September 1, 2005. For the PSP game's Japanese release, Activision and Konami signed an agreement to market and distribute the game.

== Reception ==
Reception

Aggregate score
| Aggregator | Score |
|---|---|
| Metacritic | (Xbox) 83/100 (PS2) 80/100 (GC) 80/100 (PSP) 67/100 (GBA) 65/100 (DS) 61/100 (N-Gage) 61/100 (PC) 42/100 |

Review scores
| Publication | Score |
|---|---|
| Edge | 6/10 |
| Electronic Gaming Monthly | 7/10 (PSP) 6.33/10 (DS) 4.83/10 |
| Eurogamer | (Xbox) 7/10 (PSP) 5/10 |
| Game Informer | 8/10 (PSP) 7.25/10 (GBA) 7/10 (N-Gage) 6.75/10 (DS) 6/10 |
| GamePro | 4.5/5 (GBA & PSP) 3.5/5 (DS) 2/5 |
| GameRevolution | A− (Xbox) B+ (PSP) C− (DS) D+ |
| GameSpot | (GBA) 7.3/10 (GC/PS2) 7.2/10 (PSP) 6.9/10 (DS) 6/10 (N-Gage) 5.2/10 (PC) 5/10 |
| GameSpy | 4/5 (DS) 3/5 (PC, N-Gage & PSP) 2/5 |
| GameZone | (PS2) 9.2/10; 9/10 (GC) 8/10 (N-Gage) 5/10 |
| IGN | (Xbox) 9/10 (PS2) 8.8/10 (DS) 7.5/10 (N-Gage) 7.1/10 (PSP) 7/10 (GBA) 6.5/10 (PC) 4.5/10 |
| Nintendo Power | (GC) 3.8/5 (DS) 3.5/5 (GBA) 3.4/5 |
| Official U.S. PlayStation Magazine | 3.5/5 |
| Official Xbox Magazine (US) | 8.6/10 |
| PC Gamer (US) | 25% |

The console versions of Spider-Man 2 were critically acclaimed. Reviewers noted that the realistic and life-sized Manhattan setting, the large variety of crimes and emergencies to stop, and the game's vivid use of Spider-Man's abilities combined to make the player feel like Spider-Man. The most popular aspect of the game was the web-swinging mechanic, where Spider-Man had to shoot webbing at an actual building, unlike previous games where he shot webbing up into the sky. However, small parts of the game were criticized, such as the repetitive side missions. Critics have ranked the game as one of the best Spider-Man games ever made. (Note: Multiple references, including:)

IGN stated on the PS2, GameCube, and Xbox version to "call it Grand Theft Spider-Man. And call it damn fine". The version won the IGN Editor's Choice Award for the year. Reviewing the GBA version, IGN praised the presentation, graphics, sound, web-zipping and wall-crawling, but thought that the music loops a lot because of the enormously long levels, it is "not the tightest combat developed for a Spider-Man game", and the levels are "a big pain in the butt to accomplish".

The Official PlayStation 2 Magazine ranked the game #80 of the "Top 100 PS2 Games of All Time". In ScrewAttack's 'Top 10 Movie-Based Games' Spider-Man 2 came in eighth. PC Gamer listed the PC version of Spider-Man 2 as one of the worst PC ports.

Spider-Man 2 received a nomination for "Outstanding Achievement in Gameplay Engineering" during the 8th Annual Interactive Achievement Awards.

=== Sales ===
Upon launch, the game had shipped more than 2 million units in North America by July 7, 2004. In the USA, the game's GBA version alone sold 600,000 copies and earned $17 million by August 2006. During the period between January 2000 and August 2006, it was the 47th highest-selling game launched for the GBA, NDS or PSP in that country. By 2005, the game had grossed $110 million in sales revenue in the USA. The game's PS2 version received a "Platinum" sales award from the ELSPA, indicating sales of at least 300,000 copies in the UK.

Spider-Man 2 sold more than 7 million units.
