= Michael Pataki =

American actor (1938–2010)

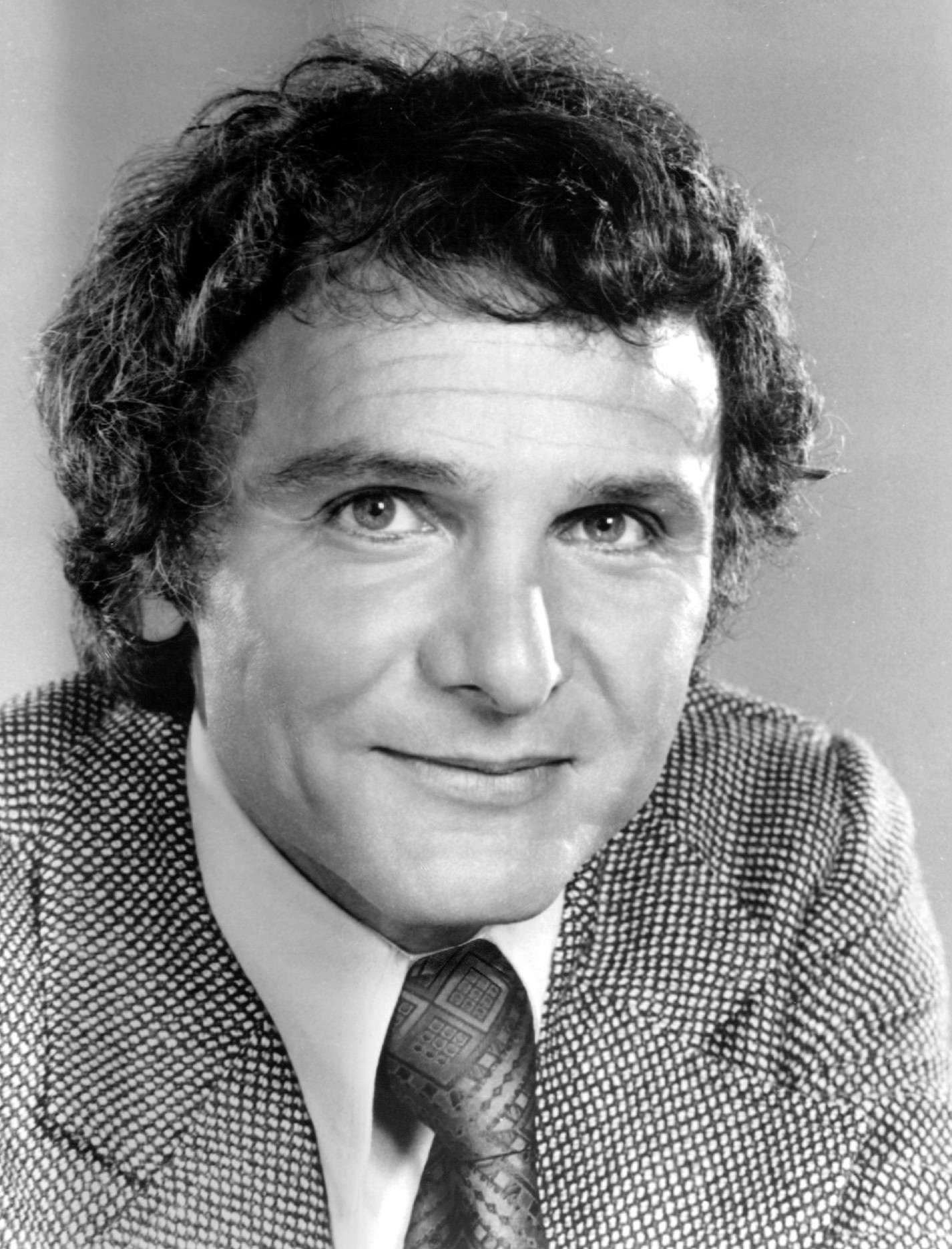
- Pataki in 1974
- Born: January 16, 1938; Youngstown, Ohio, U.S.
- Died: April 15, 2010 (aged 72); North Hollywood, California, U.S.
- Education: University of Southern California
- Occupation: Actor
- Years active: 1958–2010
- Known for: Spider-Man; Love at First Bite; Airport '77; Spider-Man Strikes Back; Rocky IV

Michael Pataki (January 16, 1938 – April 15, 2010) was an American actor of stage, film and television.

== Early life ==
Pataki was born in Youngstown, Ohio, to Hungarian parents, the youngest of three children. He had an elder brother and an elder sister. He attended the University of Southern California with a double major in political science and drama. His career was launched at a summer stock festival in Edinburgh in 1966 as Jerry in The Zoo Story.

== Television career ==
Pataki had a co-starring role on the 1974–75 groundbreaking ABC-TV series Get Christie Love! playing Officer Pete Gallagher, Christie Love's bumbling but well-meaning sidekick with the dream to one day be a technical advisor on a TV cop show. Despite being the first detective TV series with an African American female lead, the characters of Christie and Pete rarely discussed race.

Pataki appeared as a guest star in numerous television productions, from the black-and-white days of Hawaiian Eye, M Squad, The Twilight Zone, Ripcord, Combat!, and My Favorite Martian, to early color shows such as The Flying Nun, All in the Family, Mr. Terrific, Garrison's Gorillas, Bonanza, Run for Your Life, Mission: Impossible, Mannix, Batman, and Felony Squad. He was also a regular on Paul Sand in Friends and Lovers, and The Amazing Spider-Man, and had a re-occurring role on McCloud as well. One of his most famous roles was as Korax, the brash, loudmouthed Klingon who provoked the bar fight in "The Trouble with Tribbles" episode of Star Trek.. He also played Governor Karnas in the Star Trek: The Next Generation episode "Too Short a Season" making Pataki one of the few Star Trek actors that appeared in both the original series and The Next Generation.

Pataki played George Liquor in the episodes of The Ren & Stimpy Show titled "Dog Show" and "Man's Best Friend"; he would also play various characters after series creator John Kricfalusi was terminated from the series, while continuing to play the latter role in subsequent Kricfalusi projects until Pataki's death, with his last appearance being in the posthumously released 2019 short Cans Without Labels. He was also the voice of The Cow in Mighty Mouse: The New Adventures, along with many other secondary characters. Pataki played a guest spot on Happy Days Season 4 as Myron "Count" Malachi, one half of the Malachi brothers. His role was notable for his line "Let the pigeons loose." He played a Russian defector in the episode "The Americanization of Ivan" in WKRP in Cincinnati.

== Film career ==
Pataki's film credits included Airport '77 (1977), Spider-Man (1977), Love at First Bite (1979), The Onion Field (1979), Raise the Titanic (1980), Remo Williams: The Adventure Begins (1985), and many others. He also appeared in Rocky IV (1985), as Nicoli Koloff, the sports administrator for Ivan Drago and had a memorable moment in Ron Howard's sex comedy Night Shift as a man who moons an entire courtroom.

Pataki has also had his fair share of B movie roles in titles such as The Last Porno Flick (1974), Carnal Madness a.k.a. Delinquent Schoolgirls (1975) with George Buck Flower, Colleen Brennan, and others. In Dracula's Dog (1977), he played opposite Reggie Nalder and José Ferrer as a descendant of Dracula who is being stalked by a vampiric Doberman Pinscher. His other horror titles included Grave of the Vampire (1972), The Baby (1973), Dead & Buried (1981) and Halloween 4: The Return of Michael Myers (1988). He also directed Richard Basehart in Mansion of the Doomed (1976).

=== Other film work ===
Pataki directed the 1977 soft-core sex farce Cinderella. He also produced a 1981 TV presentation of Pippin with David Sheehan, starring William Katt.

== Death ==
Pataki died from cancer on April 15, 2010, at the age of 72. He completed his recording for George Liquor for Cans Without Labels before his death and the short was dedicated to his memory.

== Selected filmography ==
- The Young Lions (1958) as Pvt. Hagstrom (uncredited)
- Ten North Frederick (1958) as Parking Lot Thug (uncredited)
- Easy Rider (1969) as Mime #4
- The Sidehackers (1969) as J.C.
- The Cut-Throats (1969) as German Sniper (uncredited)
- Dream No Evil (1970) as Rev. Paul Jessie Bundy
- The Andromeda Strain (1971) as Operator of 'The Hands' (uncredited)
- The Return of Count Yorga (1971) as Joe
- Brute Corps (1971) as MacFarlane
- The All American Hustler (1972) as Carol's Boyfriend (uncredited)
- The Pink Angels (1972) as Biker
- Grave of the Vampire (1972) as Caleb Croft / Professor Lockwood
- The Dirt Gang (1972) as Snake
- The Black Bunch (1973) as Mr. Heinke
- The Baby (1973) as Dennis
- Sweet Jesus, Preacherman (1973) as State Senator Sills
- Little Cigars (1973) as Garage Mechanic
- Heterosexualis (1973) as Virgil
- Last Foxtrot in Burbank (1973) as Paul
- The Bat People (1974) as Sgt. Ward
- The Last Porno Flick (1974) as Ziggy
- Get Christie Love! (1974–75) as Sgt. Pete Gallagher
- Carnal Madness (1975) as Carl C. Clooney
- Airport '77 (1977) as Wilson
- Spider-Man (1977, TV Movie) as Captain Barbera
- Dracula's Dog (1977) as Michael Drake / Count Igor Dracula
- Jailbait Babysitter (1977) as Roger Warfield (uncredited)
- Spider-Man Strikes Back (1978) as Captain Barbera (voice)
- Superdome (1978, TV Movie) as Tony Sicota
- When Every Day Was the Fourth of July (1978, TV Movie) as Robert Najarian
- Ruby and Oswald (1978, TV movie) as Ike Pappas
- The Pirate (1978, TV Movie) as General Eshnev
- Love at First Bite (1979) as Mobster
- The Onion Field (1979) as Dist. Atty. Dino Fulgoni
- The Glove (1979) as Harry Iverson
- The Last Word (1979) as Dobbs
- Disaster on the Coastliner (1979, TV Movie) as Tate
- Up Yours (1979) as Virgil / Virgil's Father
- Raise the Titanic (1980) as Munk
- High Noon, Part II: The Return of Will Kane (1980, TV Movie) as Darold
- Graduation Day (1981) as Principal Guglione
- Dead and Buried (1981) as Sam
- Night Shift (1982) as Man Who Moons Courtroom (uncredited)
- Sweet Sixteen (1983) as George Martin
- One More Chance (1983) as Sam
- Remo Williams: The Adventure Begins (1985) as Jim Wilson
- Rocky IV (1985) as Nicolai Koloff
- American Anthem (1986) as Coach Soranhoff
- The Underachievers (1987) as Murphy
- Death House (1987) as Franco Moretti
- Halloween 4: The Return of Michael Myers (1988) as Dr. Hoffman
- Hollywood Hot Tubs 2: Educating Crystal (1990) as Professor Drewton
- Batman: The Animated Series (1992) as the Sewer King in the 6th episode entitled: 'The Underdwellers' (voice only role)
- The Looking Glass (2003) as Frank
- Edge of Nowhere (2003) as Sheriff
- Trim (2010) as Dimitri
- Cans Without Labels (2019) as George Liquor (posthumous release)
