= Emil Farkas =

Martial arts instructor, writer (born 1946)

Emil Farkas (born 1946) is an American martial arts instructor and writer known for his appearances in numerous films and in television shows.

== Life ==
Farkas was born in Hungary in 1946. During the Hungarian Revolution of 1956, Farkas' father decided to escape Hungary The family escaped through the border and went to a refugee camp in Vienna. Farkas later came to live in Toronto, Canada. He began training in the martial arts at a young age and he earned his black belt in Judo at age 17 and his black belt in Karate at 18.

His family moved to Los Angeles and Farkas studied at the California State University, Northridge. At age 22, he took a job as a bodyguard for Phil Spector. In 1970, Farkas founded his own dojo, the Beverly Hills Karate Academy where he has been teaching now for over 45 years. The dojo is now however closed as of 2023. Farkas wrote the first script for a ninja movie, but the film was never produced. Farkas later became a stunt and fight coordinator for martial arts movies. Farkas has co-authored and published books on martial arts. One of his ideas for a film sent to Robert Kosberg was used in the book How to Sell Your Idea to Hollywood to illustrate how "the sheer simplicity of an idea can be coupled with fortuitous circumstances-catapult[ed] an outsider into the Hollywood game."

Farkas has been on the cover and featured in many martial arts publications. In 1978, he was on the cover of Inside Kung Fu with the story "Emil Farkas vs. the Amazing Spiderman".

Farkas holds an eighth-degree black belt in Karate and is both a fourth-degree black belt in Judo and Jujitsu. He has been termed "Sensei to the Stars" for his martial arts training with celebrities.

== Filmography ==
- Spider-Man Strikes Back (1978)
- Combat Shotokan (1989)
- American Masters & Champions of the Martial Arts (2003)
- Encyclopedia of Self Defense (2000)

== Publications ==
- The Complete Martial Arts Catalogue (1977) ISBN 9780671226688
- A Woman's Guide to Self Defense (1978) ISBN 9780030210518
- The Overlook Martial Arts Dictionary (1981) ISBN 9780879511333
- Training and Fighting Skills (1980) ISBN 9780865680159
- Martial Arts : Traditions, History, People (1983) ISBN 9780831758059
- The Martial Arts Dictionary (1989) ISBN 9780850315981
- Mujeres, defiéndanse : no más víctimas indefensas : expertos les enseñan cómo dominar al agresor (English:Women Defend yourself: no more helpless victims: experts teach you how to master the aggressor) (1993) ISBN 9789684096820
- The Original Martial Arts Encyclopedia: Tradition, History, Pioneers (1993) ISBN 9780961512637
- The Original Martial Arts Encyclopedia: A Century of Martial Arts Worldwide (2011) ISBN 9781478351788
