= Nicholas Hammond =

American-Australian actor and writer (born 1950)

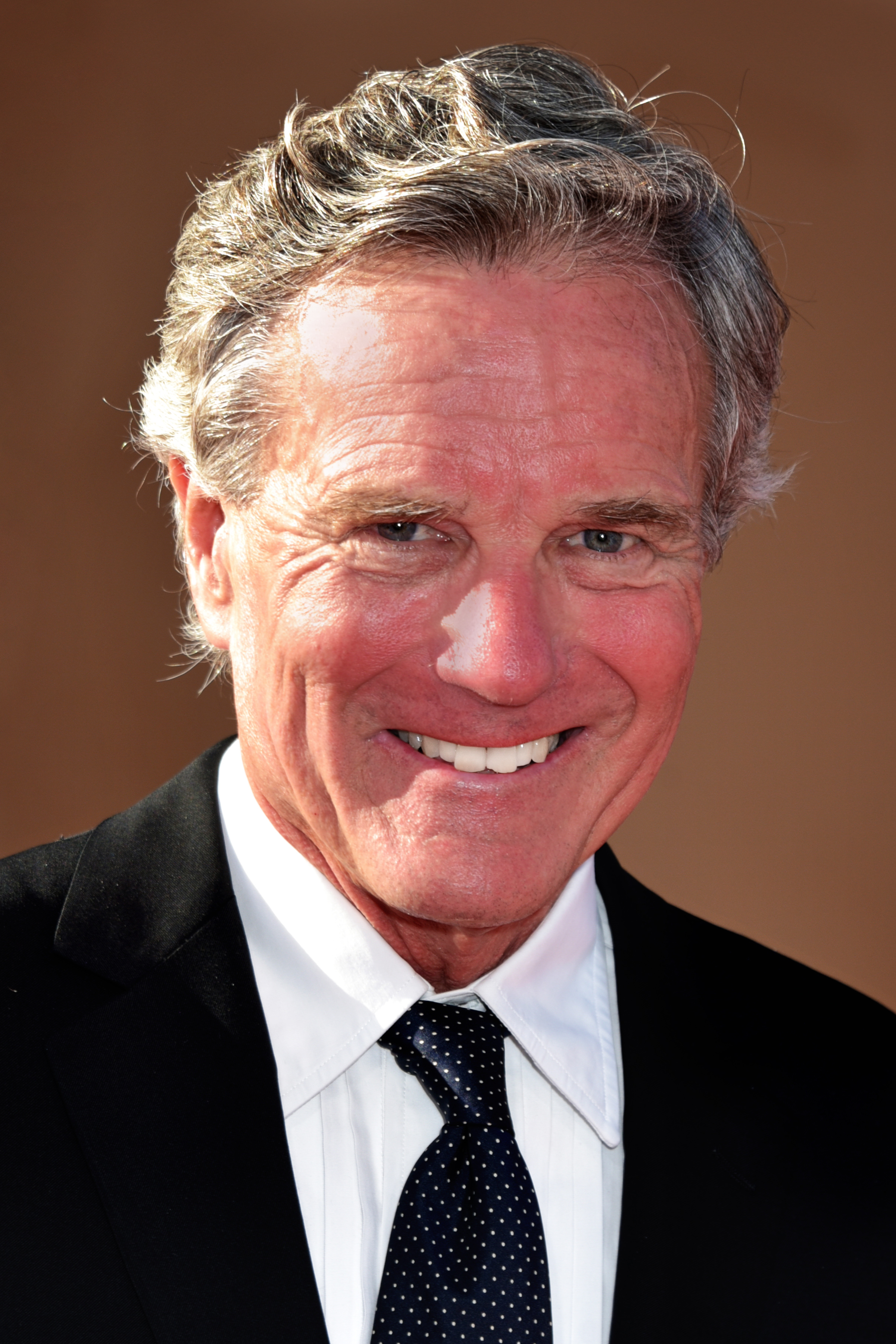
- Hammond in 2019
- Born: 15 May 1950 (age 76); Washington, D.C., U.S.
- Education: Landon School
- Alma mater: Princeton University
- Years active: 1961–present
- Known for: The Sound of Music; Lord of the Flies; The Amazing Spider-Man
- Spouse: Laura Soli (m. 1980; div. 1984)
- Partner: Robyn Nevin (1987–present)
- Mother: Eileen Bennett

Nicholas Hammond (born 15 May 1950) is an American-Australian actor and writer who is best known for his roles as Friedrich von Trapp in the film The Sound of Music and as Peter Parker/Spider-Man in the 1970s television series The Amazing Spider-Man. He also appeared in the film Spider-Man (1977) and its two sequels, Spider-Man Strikes Back and Spider-Man: The Dragon's Challenge.

== Early life, family and education ==
Hammond was born on May 15, 1950, in Washington, D.C., the son of Colonel Thomas West Hammond, Jr. and Eileen Hammond (née Bennett). Thomas was an American of English descent and an officer in the US Army while Eileen was English and an actress of stage and screen; she starred opposite George Formby in the feature film Much Too Shy (1942). They met and married in London during World War II as his father was posted in the UK. Hammond has an elder brother, David (b. 1946 in Paris). After the war, they moved to the United States permanently. Because the colonel had an army job, the Hammond family moved many times to various army stations across the US before he attended college. Hammond began acting at age six.

In 1971, Nicholas graduated from the Landon School in Bethesda, Maryland, then from Princeton University in Princeton, New Jersey, where he performed in the Triangle Club's A Different Kick (1968–1969). Col. Hammond died of heart attack in 1970.

== Career ==
Hammond was 11 years old when he made his acting debut as Robin Rhodes in the Broadway play The Complaisant Lover in 1961, playing alongside Michael Redgrave and Googie Withers.

At the same time, Hammond began to shoot for the film Lord of the Flies (not released until 1963) which marked his film debut. After this, Hammond played what was to be his most notable big screen role: Friedrich von Trapp (the elder of the two boys) in the 1965 hit The Sound of Music.

Hammond's first acting role as an adult was in Conduct Unbecoming (1970). In 1972, Hammond appeared as Peter Linder in Skyjacked. The following year, he made a guest appearance playing a teenager on The Brady Bunch in season 4, episode 90, "The Subject Was Noses". Here he appears as the high school hunk Doug Simpson, who loses interest in Marcia Brady (Maureen McCormick) after her temporary disfigurement from football injury. Also in 1973, Hammond appeared in The Waltons episode "The Townie", playing Theodore Claypool Jr.

Having transitioned to young leading man roles, Hammond spent several seasons in daytime soap operas such as General Hospital. He also appeared on many television shows of the 1970s including Hawaii Five-O. In 1977 Hammond and fellow The Sound of Music alumnus Heather Menzies (who played Louisa von Trapp) performed in "The Judas Goat", an episode of the TV adaptation of Logan's Run. He also contributed to The Sound of Music Family Scrapbook.

=== Spider-Man ===
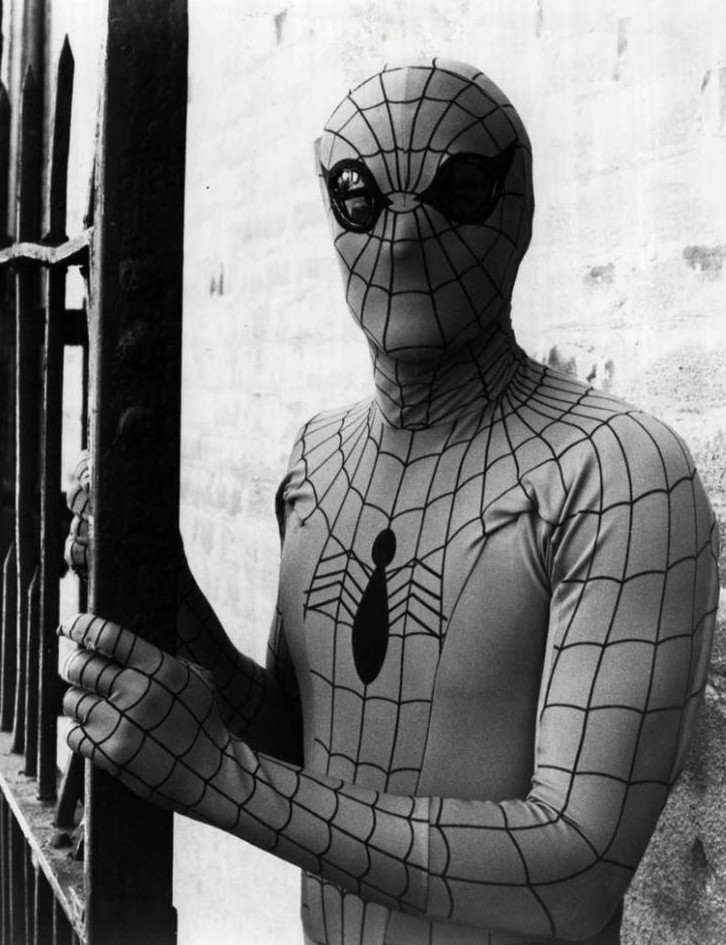
Hammond as Spider-Man

From 1977 to 1979, Hammond played the role for which he is perhaps best known, as Peter Parker/Spider-Man in the television series The Amazing Spider-Man, being the first actor to play a live-action Peter Parker and the second live-action Spider-Man after Danny Seagren in the Spidey Super Stories segments on The Electric Company. Hammond described his approach to the character: "I liked the idea of taking a fantasy hero and making him believable as a person. I made it clear going into it that I wasn't interested in doing something that was just a camp joke."

The series aired sporadically on CBS, with 13 episodes airing over two seasons. A pilot movie appeared in the fall of 1977, with the series returning as a mid-season replacement for five episodes in the spring of 1978. While the show did well in the ratings, CBS was unwilling to commit to a regular timeslot due to its relatively weak showing in the lucrative adult demographic. The second season aired six episodes, each an hour long, in the fall of 1978 and winter of 1979, with a final two-hour episode in the summer of that year. Although Hammond played Peter Parker in the television series, in all of the scenes in which Spider-Man is seen performing stunts or without dialogue, stunt double Fred Waugh was filmed by a second camera unit.

=== Later career ===
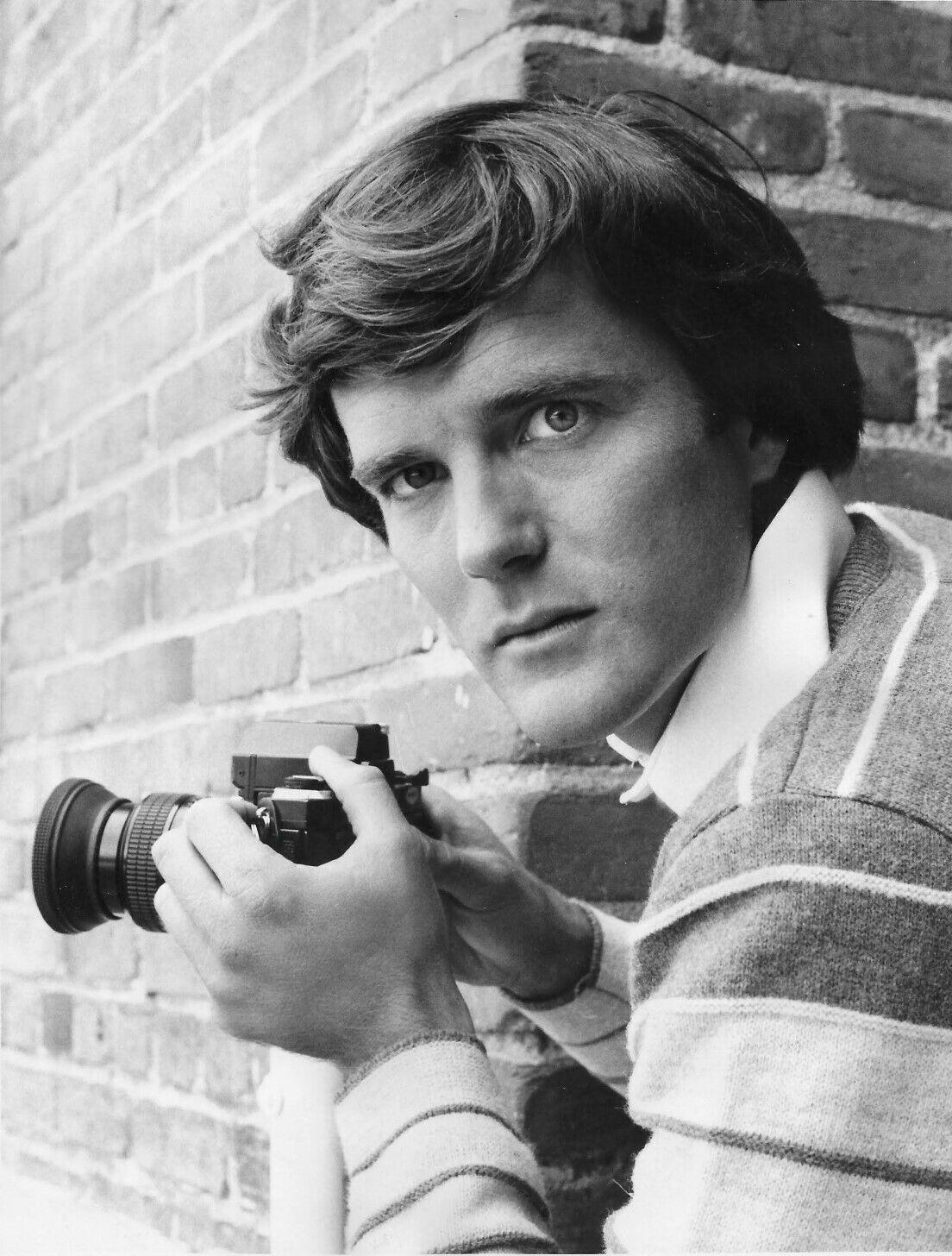
Hammond as Peter Parker in 1977

After the Spider-Man series ended, Hammond guest-starred on a number of TV shows of the early 1980s—including The Love Boat, Magnum, P.I. and Murder, She Wrote—and played recurring roles on Falcon Crest and Dallas. After being cast as yachtsman Dennis Conner in the 1986 Australian TV miniseries The Challenge, about the 1983 America's Cup challenge, Hammond liked the country so much that he decided to stay. He later became an Australian citizen and then appeared in several television miniseries filmed in Australia. Among these was an important role as Burgess, an American World War II officer based in Far North Queensland in the major miniseries Fields of Fire, series I and II, set in the cane fields of tropical Australia. His character represented the gentler side of the culture clash between Australians and Americans.

Hammond had a starring role as Sir Ivor Creevy-Thorne in Mirror, Mirror, an Australia/New Zealand extended miniseries (a complete story of 20 serialised episodes, with cliffhangers between each of the episodes). Hammond also guest-starred in various Australian television series, including satirical television programs such as BackBerner and CNNNN, the science fiction program Farscape and dramatic series such as The Flying Doctors, MDA and the Australian/USA co-production Mission: Impossible (which was filmed in Australia).

In 2005, Hammond portrayed television producer Aaron Spelling in Dynasty: The Making of a Guilty Pleasure, a fictionalized television movie based on the creation and behind the scenes production of Dynasty. Hammond is a writer for Australian television, having written both the miniseries A Difficult Woman and the television film Secret Men's Business. In 2009, he made his directing debut with Lying Cheating Bastard, a play he co-wrote with magician James Galea. In 2019, Hammond portrayed director Sam Wanamaker in the Quentin Tarantino film Once Upon a Time in Hollywood.

== Personal life ==
Hammond married Laura Soli in 1980, and they divorced in 1984. He moved to Australia in the mid-1980s and now lives in Sydney, with the Australian actress Robyn Nevin.

Hammond has remained close friends with his Sound of Music siblings, several of whom joined a multitude of other actors and co-stars for the 'Save the Rose Theatre' campaign's street event, amid talent from many international productions.

== Filmography ==
=== Film ===
Year	Title	Role	Notes
1963	Lord of the Flies	Robert	
1965	The Sound of Music	Friedrich von Trapp	
1971	Been Down So Long It Looks Like Up to Me	Agneau	
1972	Skyjacked	Peter Lindner	
1972	Cherry Blossoms	Luke	
1973	The Brady Bunch	Doug Simpson	
1973	Superdad	Roger Rhinehurst	
1977	Family, season 2 episode 7, "The Cradle Will Fall"	John Crosswell	
1977	Spider-Man	Peter Parker / Spider- Man	
1978	Spider-Man Strikes Back	Peter Parker / Spider- Man	
1981	Spider-Man: The Dragon's Challenge	Peter Parker / Spider- Man	
1982	Richard II	Henry "Hotspur" Percy	
1983	The Tempest	Ferdinand	
1988	Emerald City	Ian Wall	
1990	Beyond My Reach	Steven Schaffer	
1990	Black Cobra 2	Lieutenant Kevin McCall	
1993	Frauds	Detective Simms	
1993	Irresistible Force	Lieutenant Nash	
1997	Paradise Road	Marty Merritt	
2001	Crocodile Dundee in Los Angeles	Curator	
2002	Spider-Man	Festival Goer	Uncredited
2003	The Rage in Placid Lake	Bill Taylor	
2005	The Saviour	Pastor	Short film
2005	Stealth	Executive Officer	
2009	Mao's Last Dancer	Reporter	
2014	Turkey Shoot	General Charles Thatcher II	aka Elimination Game
2018	The BBQ	Carver	
2018	Ladies in Black	Mr. Ryder	
2019	Once Upon a Time in Hollywood	Sam Wanamaker	
2024	Art of Eight Limbs	Nick Buckley	
2025	The Travellers	Charles Kennelworth	

=== Television ===
Year	Title	Role	Notes
1962	The Defenders	Bobby Braden	Episode: "The Last Six Months"
1967	Soldier in Love	Young John Churchill	Television film
1971	Mr and Mrs Bo Jo Jones	Evan Clark	ABC Movie of the Week
1971–1974	Owen Marshall, Counselor at Law	George Kramer / Frank Harland / Jimmy Slade	3 episodes
1973	The Brady Bunch	Doug Simpson	Episode: "The Subject Was Noses"
1973	The Waltons	Theodore Albert Claypool Jr.	Episode: "The Townie"
1973	Catch-22	Edward Nately	Television film
1973	Outrage	Ron Werner	ABC Movie of the Week
1974	Double Solitaire	Peter	Television film
1974	Sorority Kill	Tim	Television film
1974	Dirty Sally	John	Episode: "I Don't, I Don't"
1974	Lucas Tanner	Andy	Episode: "Thirty Going on Twenty"
1973–1974	Gunsmoke	Britt / Doak Noonan	3 episodes
1976	Rich Man, Poor Man	Walters	Episode: "Part I"
1976	Petrocelli	Whitey	Episode: "Blood Money"
1976	Law of the Land	Brad Jensen	Television film
1976	Family	John Crosswell	Episode: "The Cradle Will Fall"
1974–1977	Hawaii Five-O	Roger / Calvin Lyle	2 episodes
1977	The Fantastic Journey	Tye	Episode: "The Innocent Prey"
1977	The Oregon Trail	Bradley	Episode: "The Army Deserter"
1977	Eight Is Enough	Harold	Episode: "Yes, Nicholas, There is a Santa Claus"
1977	Logan’s Run	Hal 14	Episode: "The Judas Goat"
1977–1979	The Amazing Spider-Man	Peter Parker / Spider-Man	13 episodes
1978	The Hardy Boys/Nancy Drew Mysteries	Lieutenant Douglas Burke	Episode: "The Lady on Thursday at Ten"
1979	Supertrain	David	Episode: "Where Have You Been Billy Boy?'"
1980	The Martian Chronicles	Commander Arthur Black	3 episodes
1980	The Love Boat	Paul Stockwood	Episode: "Seoul Mates"
1981	Manions of America	Padric O'Manion / Sean O'Manion	2 episodes
1982	The Adventures of Pollyanna	Reverend Tull	Television film
1982	Falcon Crest	Michael Deering	2 episodes
1982	Magnum, P.I.	Clarke Troubshaw	Episode: "Foiled Again"
1982	Dallas	Bill Johnson	3 episodes
1985	General Hospital	Algernon Durban	6 episodes
1985	Crazy Like a Fox	Bill Merrick	Episode: "Till Death Do Us Part"
1985	Murder, She Wrote	Todd Worthy	Episode: "Murder in the Afternoon"
1986	The Challenge	Dennis Conner	6 episodes
1986	Cyclone Tracy	Harry Nelson	3 episodes
1987	Fields of Fire	Burgess	Episode: "1.2"
1988	Fields of Fire II	Burgess	Episode: "1.1"
1989	Mission: Impossible	Woodward	Episode: "The Greek"
1989	Trouble in Paradise	Arthur	Television film
1989	The Flying Doctors	Richard Hull	Episode: "No Tears"
1990–1992	Embassy	Ed Benson	2 episodes
1992	Frankie’s House	Major Frey	4 episodes
1994	The Damnation of Harvey McHugh	Corky	Episode: "Hey St. Jude"
1995	The Feds	Milton Morehouse	Episode: "Terror"
1995	Mirror Mirror	Sir Ivor Creevey-Thorne	20 episodes
1996	Mercury	Jack Koper	Episode: "Without Fear or Favour"
1996–2000	Flipper	Doctor / Agent Smiley / Wade Fleming	3 episodes
1997	20,000 Leagues Under the Sea	Saxon	2 episodes
1998	13 Gantry Road	Russell	Television film
2000	Tales of the South Seas	Luke	Episode: "The Rabblercrouser"
2000	On the Beach	US President	Television film
2000	The Track	Mark Twain	Episode: "A Rough Start"; voice
2000	The Lost World	Phil Dillon	Episode: "Tourist Season"
2000–2002	BackBerner	Various	6 episodes
2001	Child Star: The Shirley Temple Story	Adolphe Menjou	Television film
2003	Farscape	Doctor Adrian Walker	2 episodes
2003	Always Greener	Nigel Milne	2 episodes
2003	CNNNN: Chaser Non-Stop News Network	Commander Oscar F. Hepple	2 episodes
2004	Salem’s Lot	Doctor	Episode: "1.1"; uncredited
2005	Dynasty: The Making of a Guilty Pleasure	Aaron Spelling	Television film
2005	MDA	Dr. Nick Standish	4 episodes
2009–2011	The Jesters	Agent Smith	2 episodes
2012	Climbed Every Mountain: The Story Behind the Sound of Music	Host	Television special
2015	Gallipoli	Henry Nevinson	4 episodes
2019	Total Control	Mitch Rumboldt	Episode: "1.2"
2022	The Crew’s Ship	Charles Gwerztraminer	6 episodes
2023	Caught	Ambassador Morricone	4 episodes
2025	Good Cop/Bad Cop	Reverend Laramie Lyle	Episode: "Skeletons"

=== Theatre ===
Year	Title	Role	Location
1961	The Complaisant Lover	Robin Rhodes	Ethel Barrymore Theatre
1970	Conduct Unbecoming	2nd Lt. John Truly	Ethel Barrymore Theatre
1987	Woman in Mind	Andy	Sydney Theatre Company
