= Peter Parker (2002 film series character) =

Film character portrayed by Tobey Maguire

- Sam Raimi's Spider-Man and Marvel Cinematic Universe character
- Tobey Maguire as Peter Parker/Spider-Man in Spider-Man 3 (2007)
- First appearance: Spider-Man (2002)
- Last appearance: Spider-Man: Across the Spider-Verse (2023)
- Based on: Spider-Man by: Stan Lee; Steve Ditko
- Adapted by: James Cameron (Note: Avi Arad, Sam Raimi, and David Koepp all confirm that some material from Cameron's unproduced scriptment served as inspiration for the 2002 film. One of the most significant carryovers was the character's lack of mechanical web-shooters.); David Koepp
- Portrayed by: Tobey Maguire
- Voiced by: Tobey Maguire (Note: Maguire voices Spider-Man in the video games Spider-Man (2002), Spider-Man 2 (2004) and Spider-Man 3 (2007).); Neil Patrick Harris (Note: Spider-Man: The New Animated Series); James Arnold Taylor (Note: Spider-Man: Friend or Foe)

In-universe information
- Full name: Peter Benjamin Parker
- Alias: Spider-Man
- Species: Human mutate
- Occupation: Superhero; Photographer; University student
- Affiliation: Daily Bugle
- Weapon: Organic webbing
- Family: May Parker (aunt); Ben Parker (uncle)
- Significant other: Mary Jane Watson
- Origin: Queens, New York City, United States

Peter Benjamin Parker, also known by his alter ego Spider-Man, is a character portrayed by Tobey Maguire. Based on the Marvel Comics character Spider-Man, he is the protagonist of Sam Raimi's Spider-Man film trilogy, which includes Spider-Man (2002), Spider-Man 2 (2004) and Spider-Man 3 (2007). Maguire also portrays Peter in the Marvel Cinematic Universe (MCU) film Spider-Man: No Way Home (2021).

Spider-Man chronicles Peter's transformation from a timid high school student to the masked superhero Spider-Man. In Spider-Man 2, Peter struggles to balance his crime-fighting persona with various aspects of his personal life; he later struggles with his darker nature in Spider-Man 3 when he is possessed by an extraterrestrial symbiote. During the trilogy, he battles the supervillains Green Goblin, Doctor Octopus, Sandman and Venom; and attempts to build a relationship with his love interest Mary Jane Watson. In Spider-Man: No Way Home, Peter travels to a parallel universe, where he encounters two other versions of himself, as well as most of the villains he previously defeated.

When casting the role of Peter, the Spider-Man production team sought an actor who was not excessively tall or handsome, but who had the "heart and soul" for the audience to identify with. Maguire was Raimi's first choice for the role after he saw him in The Cider House Rules (1999). Maguire's portrayal of the character has received praise from critics and fans alike. Raimi's trilogy and Maguire's portrayal of Spider-Man are credited with contributing to the rise of superhero films in the 2000s. A number of video game adaptations were attributed to the character from Raimi's trilogy, alongside an animated series that was designed to be set within the same continuity. Maguire also voices the character in the series' tie-in video games.

== Concept and creation ==
David Koepp is the original screenwriter of the character outside of many attempted scripts to bring to life a Spider-Man film. Maguire was cast as Peter in July 2000 following a screen test, having been Raimi's primary choice for the role after he saw The Cider House Rules. The studio was initially hesitant to cast some actors, as Leonardo DiCaprio, Freddie Prinze Jr., Jude Law, Zach Braff, Chris O'Donnell, Chris Klein, Wes Bentley and Heath Ledger, while Jake Gyllenhaal (who almost replaced Maguire from his injuries, and later cast as Mysterio in Spider-Man: Far From Home) was considered for the role in the second film, who did not seem to fit the ranks of "adrenaline-pumping, tail-kicking titans," but Maguire managed to impress studio executives with his audition. The actor was signed for a deal in the range of $3 to $4 million with higher salary options for two sequels. Maguire was trained by a physical trainer, a yoga instructor, a martial arts expert, and a climbing expert, taking several months to improve his physique. Maguire also sought to learn the typical movements of spiders in his spare time. Costume designer James Acheson began forming several concepts for Spider-Man's suit designs and claimed that the suit left Maguire feeling claustrophobic, preferring only to wear the suit if a scene did not require him to put on the mask.

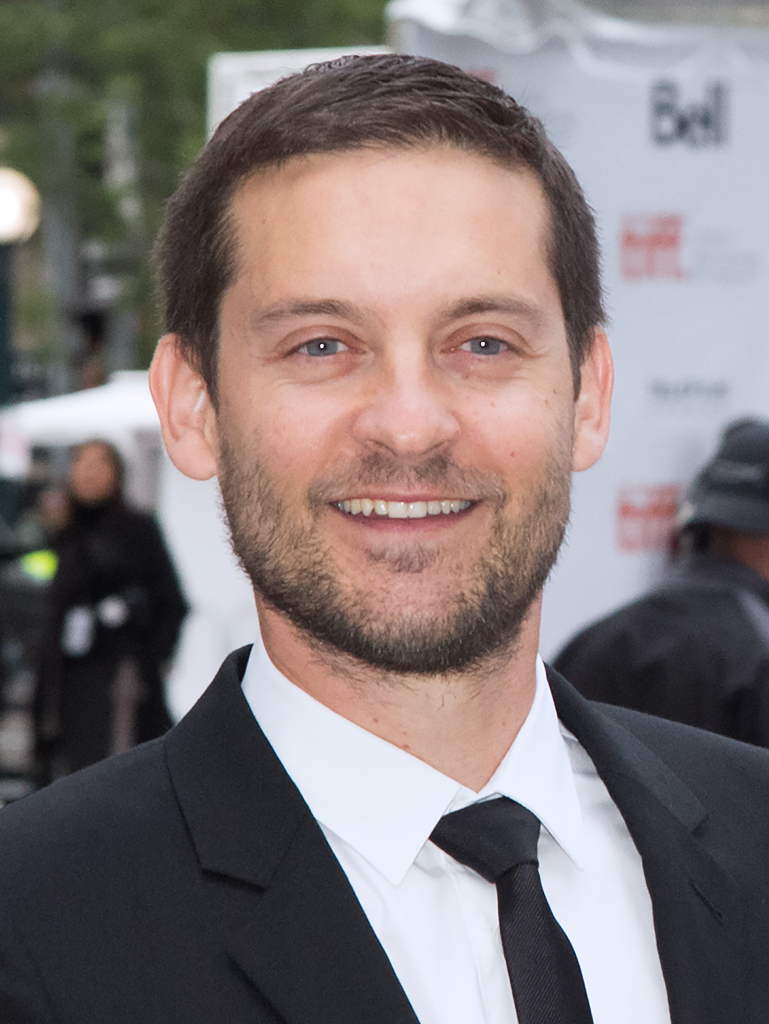
Tobey Maguire in 2014

Following the success of the first film, 2003 saw disparaging scenes between lead actor Tobey Maguire and the executives of distributor company Sony, as Maguire was close to being released from his contract following a dispute between the pair. Maguire had finished filming a now multi nominated Oscar production in the form of Seabiscuit, and had complained of the physical strain during his last two films. Sony executives believed that this was merely "part of Maguire's negotiating tactics", as a last attempt to bargain for a more lucrative paycheck, a statement quickly dismissed by Maguire's publicist. His role was offered to Gyllenhaal, but Maguire was able to secure the role with the help of his then-girlfriend Jennifer Meyer’s father Ronald Meyer. Maguire later admitted that his behavior toward the situation—thinking the studio would make accommodations for him—was “inappropriate” and that he had learned his lesson.

Remaining a constant in all the rewrites was the "organic web shooter" idea from the Cameron "scriptment." Raimi felt he would stretch the audience's suspension of disbelief too far to have Peter invent mechanical web shooters.

Following the release of the third installment of the series, and its subsequent success at the box office, the now billion-dollar franchise had been put into disarray, after director Sam Raimi had become unhappy with the script of his planned Spider-Man 4, leaving the movie to fall past its projected May 2011 release date. Further details were released after a statement made by Raimi explaining "the studio and Marvel have a unique opportunity to take the franchise in a new direction, and I know they will do a terrific job". Later reports confirmed that both Maguire and Raimi had left their respective roles. Sony proceeded with a reboot of the series titled The Amazing Spider-Man, starring Andrew Garfield as Peter Parker. The reboot was released in the United States on July 3, 2012.

In December 2017, Phil Lord and Christopher Miller said that an adult Peter Parker / Spider-Man would appear in the 2018 animated feature film Spider-Man: Into the Spider-Verse as a mentor to Miles Morales. In February 2019, Maguire was confirmed to have been considered to be cast to reprise his role from the Sam Raimi Spider-Man trilogy, but the idea was dropped so as not to confuse the audience with the concept of the "Spider-Verse", with Jake Johnson cast in his place in April 2018; despite this, references throughout the film and an archival recording of Cliff Robertson as Uncle Ben from Spider-Man 2 are used to indicate Johnson's portrayal of Parker to still be a similar incarnation to Maguire's.

Following the release of The Amazing Spider-Man 2, after Garfield was allegedly let go of the role of Spider-Man according to documents released in the aftermath of the 2014 Sony Pictures hack, leaked information from the hack indicated Sony to have previously been in talks with Sam Raimi to have him direct Spider-Man vs. The Amazing Spider-Man, a multiversal crossover film featuring Garfield's Spider-Man encounter Tobey Maguire's Spider-Man (with Maguire reprising his role), as well as a new film trilogy starring Maguire (following Garfield's firing) as a middle-aged Spider-Man; and to also be in talks with Marvel Studios about integrating a rebooted version of Spider-Man into the Marvel Cinematic Universe (MCU), beginning with Captain America: Civil War (2016), a deal was reached in early 2015 between the two studios to make the latter official, effectively cancelling The Amazing Spider-Man franchise.

Despite both reboots of the Spider-Man film series, Maguire reprises his role in Spider-Man: No Way Home (2021), a film set in the MCU, appearing alongside Garfield's iteration of the character as a supporting character to the new MCU iteration of Spider-Man played by Tom Holland. It was reported in 2020 that Maguire would reprise his role as his version of Peter Parker alongside the other cinematic iterations of the character in the third MCU Spider-Man film; however, these reports were never confirmed by Sony or Marvel Studios and publicly denied by both Holland and Garfield several times prior to the film's release.

== Costume ==
Top: The primary suit used by Peter in the Raimi trilogy, as depicted in the video game Marvel's Spider-Man (2018)
Bottom: The black suit, as depicted in Spider-Man 3 (2007)

Although Spider-Man's costume wound up being faithful to the Spider-Man comics, many designs were made. One concept that costume designer James Acheson became fond of was the idea of having a red emblem over a black costume. Another, which would eventually lead to the final product, featured an enlarged logo on the chest and red stripes going down the sides of the legs. To create Spider-Man's costume, Maguire was fitted for the skintight suit, being covered with layers of substance to create the suit's shape. It was designed as a single piece, including the mask. A hard shell was worn underneath the mask to make the shape of the head look better and to keep the mask tight while keeping the wearer comfortable. For scenes where he would take off his mask, an alternate suit where the mask was a separate piece was made. The webbing, which accented the costume, was cut by computer. The mask's eye-lenses were designed to have a mirror look. Dykstra said the biggest difficulty of creating Spider-Man was that as the character was masked, it immediately lost a lot of characterization. Without the context of eyes or mouth, a lot of body language had to be put in so that there would be emotional content. Raimi wanted to convey the essence of Spider-Man as being "the transition that occurs between him being a young man going through puberty and being a superhero." Dykstra said his crew of animators had never reached such a level of sophistication until giving subtle hints of making Spider-Man feel like a human being. When two studio executives were shown shots of the computer-generated character, they believed it was actually Maguire performing stunts.

Costume designer James Acheson made numerous subtle changes to Spider-Man's costume in Spider-Man 2, although keeping the design relatively the same. The colors were made richer and bolder. The spider emblem was given more elegant lines and enlarged, the eye-lenses were somewhat smaller, and the muscle suit underneath was made into pieces, to give a better sense of movement. The helmet Maguire wore under his mask was also improved, with better movement for the false jaw and magnetic eyepieces, which were easier to remove.

In Spider-Man 3, Peter has two variations of his suit: his traditional one and one colored in black that forms due to an alien symbiote bonding to him. The symbiote suit worn in the comics by Spider-Man was a plain black affair with a large white spider on the front and back. Initially, the design for the symbiote suit for the film was made of latex and looked more faithful to the one in the comics, but it was rejected by the producers. The final design was changed for the film to become a black version of Spider-Man's traditional costume, complete with webbing motif. It also had a slightly different spider symbol. As a consequence of this, the suit Topher Grace wore as Venom also bore the webbing motif; as producer Grant Curtis noted, "it's the Spider-Man suit, but twisted and mangled in its own right." Additionally, the motif gave a sense of life to the symbiote, giving it the appearance of gripping onto the character's body.

== Characterization and analysis ==
James Whitbrook of Gizmodo described Maguire's Peter as a relatable "down-on-his-luck geek" who deals with the same problems as everyone else. In Spider-Man 2, director Sam Raimi felt that the film had to thematically explore Peter's internal conflict with his personal wants against his responsibility, the positives and negatives of his chosen path, and how he ultimately decides that he can be happy as a heroic figure. Raimi stated the story was partly influenced by Superman II, which depicted Superman giving up his responsibilities. The plot of Spider-Man 2 is mainly derived from the comic book series The Amazing Spider-Man No. 50, "Spider-Man No More!" According to Raimi, Peter Parker's story is about "a life out of balance". Peter is caught between a life where he tries to help people and atone for his uncle's death with his Spider-Man alter-ego and another where he tries to balance his studies, occupation as a photographer and his relationship with his family and friends. Peter acknowledges that he cannot be with Mary Jane without endangering her, due to his Spider-Man alter-ego; fearing that if his enemies would ever find out about his true identity, they would target his loved ones. As a result, Peter distances himself from Mary Jane, but eventually rekindles his relationship with her after she finds out about his dual life, and struggles he has faced.

In Spider-Man 3, Raimi intended to further develop Peter's character with the planned film focusing on Peter learning that he is not a sinless vigilante and that there can also be humanity in those he considers criminals, especially as the Venom symbiote brings out the darker aspects of Peter's personality upon bonding with him. Raimi himself quoted: "The most important thing Peter right now has to learn is that this whole concept of him as the avenger or him as the hero, he wears this red and blue outfit, with each criminal he brings to justice he's trying to pay down this debt of guilt he feels about the death of Uncle Ben. He considers himself a hero and a sinless person versus these villains that he nabs. We felt it would be a great thing for him to learn a little less black and white view of life and that he's not above these people." Raimi based his ideas out of the original comic books.

== Fictional character biography ==
=== Spider-Man (2002) ===
Peter is introduced as a shy teenager at Midtown High School in New York City with a longtime crush on his neighbor Mary Jane Watson. Prior to a school field trip to a genetics laboratory at Columbia University, Peter's best friend Harry Osborn introduces Peter to his father Norman Osborn, the CEO of Oscorp. At the laboratory, a genetically modified spider bites Peter, who falls ill upon returning home.

The next morning, Peter finds he is no longer near-sighted and that his physique has improved significantly. He has developed spider-like powers, including enhanced agility and speed, the ability to cling to walls, and organic webbing in his wrists. Hoping to buy a car to impress Mary Jane, Peter enters an underground wrestling event and wins his first match, but is cheated out of the prize money. When a man robs the event, Peter allows him to escape. Minutes later, Peter finds that someone fatally shot his uncle Ben and stole his car. Enraged, Peter pursues and confronts the carjacker, only to realize it was the thief he let escape. After Peter disarms him, the carjacker attempts to flee but dies after falling out a window.

Upon graduating high school, Peter begins using his abilities to fight crime as a masked vigilante known as Spider-Man. J. Jonah Jameson, the publisher of the Daily Bugle newspaper, begins a smear campaign against Spider-Man while also hiring Peter as a freelance photographer. Peter moves into an apartment with Harry, but keeps his Spider-Man identity a secret. He is assigned to take photos at the World Unity Fair, where he encounters the Green Goblin, who is a deranged Norman in disguise. When Norman begins wreaking havoc, Peter fights him off and rescues Mary Jane as she falls from a balcony. Norman later invites Peter to join him, but Peter refuses.

Once Norman deduces that Peter is Spider-Man, he attacks Peter's aunt May and kidnaps Mary Jane. He dangles Mary Jane and a Roosevelt Island Tramway car full of children from the Queensboro Bridge. Peter saves everyone, then is thrown by Norman into an abandoned building. Norman brutally beats Peter, but Peter finds the strength to fight back when Norman says he will kill Mary Jane. With Peter gaining the upper hand, Norman reveals his identity and begs for mercy. With Peter distracted, Norman sends his glider to impale him, but Peter's spider-sense allows him to dodge the attack. The glider fatally impales Norman, who asks Peter not to reveal his identity as the Goblin to Harry. Norman dies, and Peter returns his body to the Osborn house. Harry seizes a gun, intent on shooting the disguised Peter, but Peter escapes.

At Norman's funeral, Harry swears vengeance on Spider-Man. Mary Jane tells Peter she is in love with him, but Peter feels he must protect her from his enemies. He hides his true feelings and tells Mary Jane that they can only be friends. As Peter leaves the funeral, he recalls his uncle's words: "With great power comes great responsibility".

=== Spider-Man 2 (2004) ===
Peter is struggling to manage his personal life while continuing to fight crime as Spider-Man. He juggles multiple jobs, fails to pay rent and finish schoolwork, and is growing distant from Harry and Mary Jane. Harry introduces Peter to Dr. Otto Octavius, whose research on fusion power is funded by Oscorp, where Harry now holds a leadership position. During a demonstration of his work, Octavius dons a harness with four robotic arms controlled by artificial intelligence. A fusion reaction causes an explosion which fuses the harness to his spine and destroys the inhibitor chip that keeps Octavius in control of the arms.

Peter and his aunt May go to a bank to argue against May's foreclosure. Octavius, increasingly influenced by the arms and dubbed "Doctor Octopus" or "Doc Ock" by the Daily Bugle editor J. Jonah Jameson, robs the bank to finance a second attempt at his experiment. Peter puts on his suit and battles Octavius, who holds May hostage. Peter manages to rescue May, and Octavius flees with the money. After getting into a fight with Harry and discovering that Mary Jane is engaged to Jameson's son John, Peter suffers an emotional breakdown. He loses his powers and decides to give up being Spider-Man. He throws his suit in a trash can, where it is found by a garbage collector who delivers it to Jameson.

Tobey Maguire as Peter Parker (left) in Spider-Man 2 and in costume as Spider-Man in Spider-Man 3

Peter begins to succeed in school and starts to mend his friendship with Mary Jane. He reveals to May the inadvertent role he played in Ben's death, and May forgives him after initial shock. While Peter helps May move out of her house, she mentions the hope Spider-Man gives to people in spite of the sacrifices he must make. Her words, in combination with increasing crime, encourage Peter to attempt a comeback as Spider-Man, though his powers remain lost.

Octavius visits Harry and demands he give him tritium for additional experiments. Harry agrees in exchange for Spider-Man. As Mary Jane meets Peter at a café to discuss whether or not he loves her, Octavius arrives, tells Peter to find Spider-Man, and captures Mary Jane. Feeling his powers returning, Peter steals his suit back from Jameson and fights Octavius, who sabotages a train. Peter saves the passengers, then collapses from exhaustion, allowing Octavius to capture him and take him to Harry.

Harry prepares to kill Spider-Man, but is shocked to see Peter under the mask. Peter convinces Harry to direct him to Octavius' makeshift laboratory so he can save Mary Jane. As Peter and Octavius fight again, Octavius' latest nuclear reaction begins to swell out of control. Peter subdues Octavius, reveals his identity, and persuades Octavius to contain the reaction. Octavius drowns the reaction at the cost of his life, and Mary Jane sees that Peter is Spider-Man. He tells her they cannot be together because it would be dangerous for her, but Mary Jane declares she will accept the risks to be with him.

=== Spider-Man 3 (2007) ===
Peter is successful in both his personal life and his life as Spider-Man. He is happily dating Mary Jane, and during a date with her in Central Park, an extraterrestrial symbiote oozes out of a fallen meteorite and attaches to his moped. Later, Peter is ambushed by Harry, who is using the Goblin serum and equipment in a quest to avenge his father. After an aerial battle, Harry is knocked unconscious and suffers amnesia. He forgets his vendetta against Spider-Man and embraces Peter as his best friend.

Mary Jane is upset by a negative review of her performance in a play, and Peter unsuccessfully tries to relate to her experience. At the Daily Bugle, Jameson pits Peter against freelance photographer Eddie Brock in a competition for a staff job. At a ceremony honoring Spider-Man, Peter kisses Gwen Stacy after being presented with the key to the city. The kiss upsets Mary Jane, and Peter delays his marriage proposal.

Peter discovers that Flint Marko, also known as "Sandman", was the man who fatally shot his Uncle Ben. While Peter is sleeping, the symbiote attaches to his suit, turning it black. Experiencing amplified power and anger while wearing the suit, Peter fights Sandman in the subway. He blasts him with water, seemingly killing him. Meanwhile, Harry regains his memory and forces Mary Jane to break up with Peter. Harry claims that he and Mary Jane are in a relationship, which enrages Peter. The two fight and Peter overpowers Harry, throwing a pumpkin bomb at him before leaving.

Peter earns the staff job at the Bugle, and begins to act arrogantly under the influence of the symbiote. Peter brings Gwen to a jazz club where Mary Jane now works, hoping to make her jealous. Offended by Peter's actions, Gwen apologizes to Mary Jane and leaves. Peter assaults the bouncers and accidentally hits Mary Jane, before realizing how deeply the symbiote is corrupting him. He retreats to a church bell tower, where he discovers that the sound of clanging metal weakens the symbiote. Using the sound of the church bell, Peter detaches it from himself. Brock witnesses the event, then becomes the symbiote's new host and turns into Venom.

Brock and Marko join forces against Spider-Man, kidnapping Mary Jane to get Peter's attention. After Harry declines to help Peter rescue Mary Jane, Harry's butler reveals that Norman's death was not Spider-Man's fault. As Brock and Marko move closer to killing Peter, Harry arrives and helps Peter subdue Marko. Brock attempts to impale Peter with Harry's glider, but Harry jumps in the way and is impaled instead. Remembering the symbiote's weakness, Peter uses metal pipes to create a sonic attack, which allows him to detach the symbiote from Brock. Peter throws a pumpkin bomb at the hostless symbiote, but not before Brock, now addicted to its influence, rushes towards the symbiote, which causes him to be destroyed along with it.

Marko explains to Peter that Ben's death was an accident and that everything Marko has done was to help his daughter. Peter forgives Marko and allows him to escape. Harry reconciles with Peter before he dies from his injuries. After Harry's funeral, Peter visits Mary Jane at the jazz club, where they share a dance.

=== Spider-Man: No Way Home (2021) ===
Nineteen years after Harry's death, Peter (dubbed "Peter-Two" in this film) is transported to a parallel universe after a magical spell cast by Doctor Strange backfires. He meets the Peter Parker of this universe ("Peter-One") and another alternate version of himself ("Peter-Three"). Peter-Two and Peter-Three console Peter-One after the death of Peter-One's aunt May at the hands of Norman Osborn, who was also transported from Peter-Two's universe. The villains Doctor Octopus, Flint Marko, Lizard and Electro have also arrived, and the three Peters develop ways to cure them of their ailments. Peter-Two mentions to Peter-Three that he was eventually able to make his relationship with Mary Jane work.

After creating cures for the villains, the Peters lure them to the Statue of Liberty. During the ensuing battle, Peter-Two cures Marko, then witnesses an enraged Peter-One attempting to kill Osborn. Peter-Two steps in front of Osborn's blade and silently coaxes Peter-One into giving up revenge, only to be stabbed by Osborn before the other Peters give Osborn an anti-serum, curing him of his deranged Goblin persona. Osborn sees Peter-Two wounded and sorrowfully asks what he has done. Afterwards, Peter-Two confirms to Peter-Three that the injury's non-progressing, bidding farewell to Peter-One as the multiverse gap closes with a shared hug. With the villains cured, everyone returns to their original universes.

=== Related comics ===
Peter appears in the comics Spider-Man 3: Movie Prequel and Spider-Man 3: The Black, which elaborates on the birth of Venom after Peter rejects the symbiote.

== In other media ==
=== Television ===
- After the success of Raimi's first film, a spin-off CGI animated series was released in 2003, starring Neil Patrick Harris as Spider-Man. This series served as a loose alternate sequel to the first Spider-Man film and was considerably darker, grittier, adult-oriented, and mature in tone and direction, compared to other Spider-Man adaptations. It received a generally positive reception from critics and audiences.
- The animated series The Spectacular Spider-Man (2008–09) made homages to various visual and storytelling elements from Raimi's films and their iteration of the character. The show's co-creator Greg Weisman said the production team elected to use a more minimalist art style for the series' world and characters so that it would particularly benefit the likes of Spider-Man himself, who would then be able to animate fluidly while in motion and mimic many movements present in Raimi's incarnation of the character. He stated, "The movies raised the bar on the thrill of Spider-Man swinging through the city. So we wanted our cartoon to capture that, which meant we wanted the style to be very iconic, but it had to be clean enough that the animators could really make these characters move without the lines running all over the place." There are various references in the show to key moments with the film trilogy's version of Parker, such as a shot of Peter landing on the subway in an identical pose to when he initially confronted Doctor Octopus on the moving train in Spider-Man 2, in addition to stopping a stolen truck from colliding with an oncoming pedestrian by using his webbing to restrict movement, in a similar manner to how Raimi's Parker stopped the active subway in said film, as well as Sandman reconciling with Peter and vanishing in thin air, emulating Peter and Marko's final moments together in Spider-Man 3. The Daily Bugle also appears early in the series, with Parker seeking to work there in order to pay for the increase in Aunt May's debt to their residence; the building is modelled after the real-life Flatiron Building as it was previously depicted in the Sam Raimi films and the comics limited series Marvels.

=== Film ===
- Prior to Sony's 2015 decision to collaborate with Marvel Studios and reboot the character of Spider-Man within the Marvel Cinematic Universe, Sony reportedly considered the option of doing a crossover film between Maguire's Spider-Man and the version of the character played by Andrew Garfield in The Amazing Spider-Man series with Sam Raimi reportedly asked to direct it. Sony also reportedly considered reviving the Raimi series outright following the critical and financial disappointment of the Webb/Garfield The Amazing Spider-Man 2 but this idea was ultimately not pursued by Sony.
- Both versions of Peter Parker who appear in Sony Pictures Animation's 2018 CGI film Spider-Man: Into the Spider-Verse take inspiration from this incarnation of Spider-Man, continuing their storyline onwards from the events of Sam Raimi's Spider-Man trilogy. The older Peter Parker, voiced by Jake Johnson, is meant to evoke an older, more cynical version of Tobey Maguire's portrayal, outright referencing several iconic moments from these films as across his career and is generally down on his luck, while the younger Peter Parker from Miles Morales' dimension, voiced by Chris Pine, who undergoes identical escapades but is far more fortunate and successful in life, including a happy marriage with Mary Jane, while the older Peter also had this marriage, but reluctantly ended up divorced due to feeling unfit to be a father because of his risky calling, a concept originally conceived of for the unmade Spider-Man 4.
  - An unused scene involving a cameo consisting of Tobey Maguire, Andrew Garfield and Tom Holland, voicing their respective Spider-Men in the film was removed due to "being too convoluted".
- Maguire's "Webbed" suit from the video game Spider-Man (2018) appears in a deleted scene of Sony's Spider-Man Universe film Morbius (2022) as a graffiti, used as a reference to the ending of Spider-Man: Far From Home (2019).
- Maguire's Peter Parker appears through archive footage from Spider-Man in the Into the Spider-Verse sequel Spider-Man: Across the Spider-Verse (2023).
- Maguire's Peter Parker is mentioned by Tom Holland's version in Spider-Man: Brand New Day (2026), as he tests out his own newfound organic webbing.

=== Video games ===
- The video game adaptations of Spider-Man, Spider-Man 2, and Spider-Man 3 all feature Tobey Maguire reprising his role as Parker in a vocal capacity. The trilogy of video games found their existence through a collaborative effort between (at the time) small-time video game publisher Activision and developer Treyarch. The first and second installments were met with favorable reviews by a large consumer base, earned upon each of their respective releases, with 2004's Spider-Man 2 garnering great success upon its arrival "with the PlayStation 2 version becoming the seventh-best-selling title of the year in the U.S.". The third installment of the video game trilogy did not live to the expectations of its predecessors, much like its film counterpart, as the game was met with lackluster reviews, leaving much to be desired about the title, although the Nintendo DS version received more positive reviews.
- The Spider symbol from Spider-Man 2 is used on Spider-Man's chest in Marvel: Ultimate Alliance and Marvel: Ultimate Alliance 2.
- This version of Peter Parker appears in Spider-Man: Friend or Foe, voiced by James Arnold Taylor. In an alternate timeline where all of his villains survived their original deaths, Spider-Man is recruited by S.H.I.E.L.D. director Nick Fury to travel to different locations around the world to recover shards from the meteor the Venom symbiote arrived in, before they fall into the wrong hands. Along the way, he faces old and new enemies who have been placed under mind-control, and subsequently teams up with them, as well as with other heroes.
- Parker's suit from the trilogy is available as a bonus suit as part of the Rhino Challenge Pack DLC in The Amazing Spider-Man film game. The black suit from Spider-Man 3 is also available in-game and is unlocked if certain requirements are met, or can be immediately unlocked by taking photos of hidden spider graffiti in the city.
  - The mobile version of the game features both the Human Spider suit and the black suit from Spider-Man 3 as purchaseable items in the in-game shop.
- Peter Parker's traditional suit from the trilogy, dubbed the "Webbed Suit" in-game, was made available in a post-launch update for Marvel's Spider-Man (2018), developed by Insomniac Games for PlayStation 4. It is available from the beginning in the game's remaster for PlayStation 5 and Windows.
  - The "Webbed Suit" returns as an unlockable suit for Peter Parker / Spider-Man in Marvel's Spider-Man 2 (2023) for PlayStation 5. In addition, Parker's symbiote suit from Spider-Man 3 is also featured in the game. It is named the "Webbed Black Suit" in-game to distinguish it from the Black Suit, Symbiote Suit and Classic Black Suit variants.

== Reception ==
Although they believed Maguire's portrayal to have less wit than his comic book counterpart, The Hollywood Reporter ranked his portrayal of Spider-Man as the tenth-greatest superhero film performance of all time; praising the actor for the "humanity and downright dorkiness that was his Peter Parker" and for his sincere, depthful portrayal of the more flawed, human side of the character. Entertainment Weekly placed him as the tenth-coolest hero of all time.

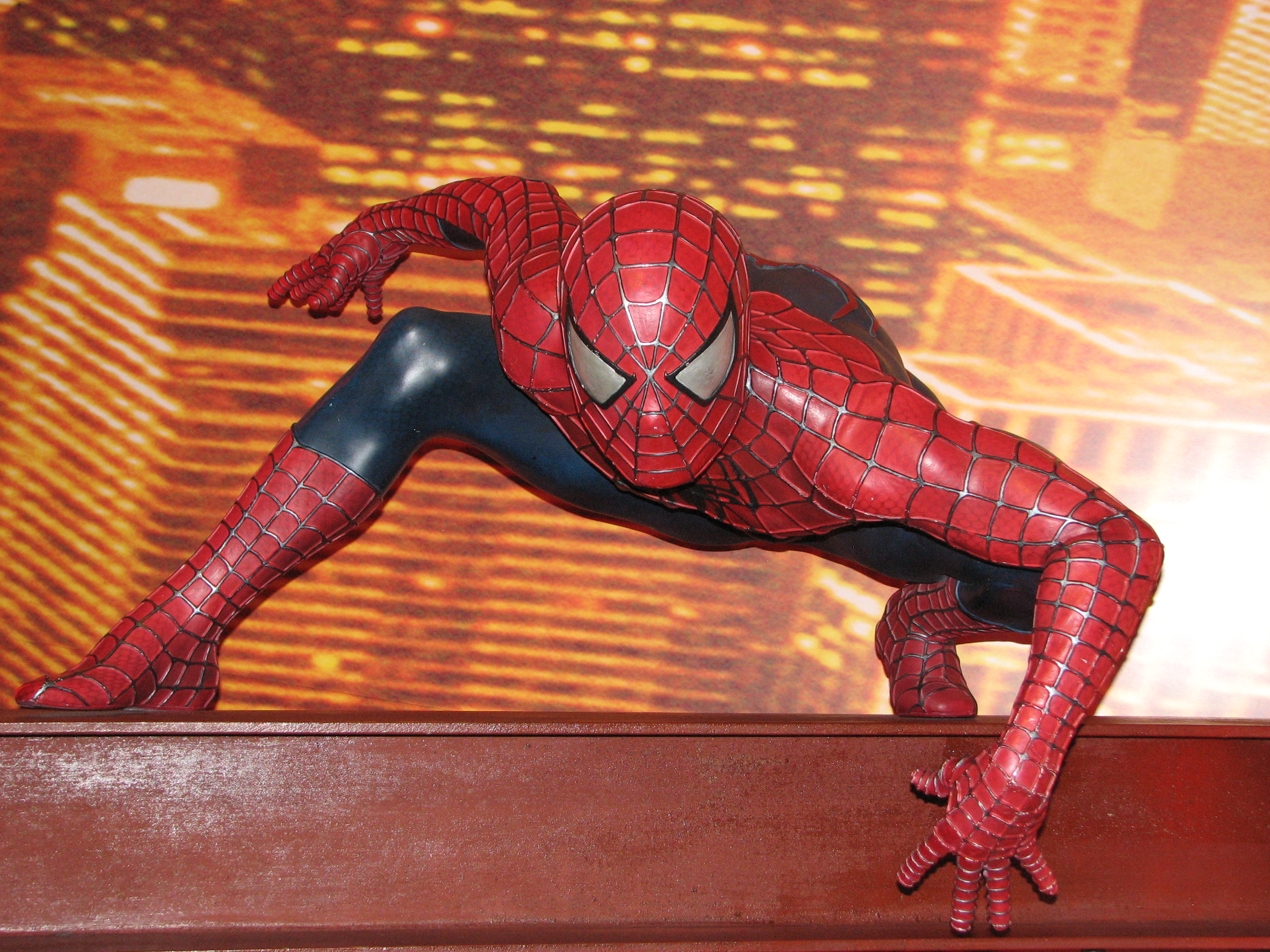
Maguire-era Spider-Man statue at Madame Tussauds, London

Responses to the character while possessed by the Venom symbiote in Spider-Man 3 (particularly a scene in which Peter dances on a street) drew polarized responses. The possessed Peter has been nicknamed "Emo Peter" or "Bully Maguire" by fans; furthermore, this iteration and his scenes have since become popular internet memes.

=== Accolades ===
Year	Film	Award	Category	Result	Ref.
2002	Spider-Man	2002 Teen Choice Awards	Choice Movie Actor: Drama/Action Adventure	Won	
2002	Spider-Man	2002 Teen Choice Awards	Choice Movie Chemistry (Note: Shared with Kirsten Dunst.)	Nominated	
2002	Spider-Man	2002 Teen Choice Awards	Choice Movie Liplock (Note: Shared with Kirsten Dunst.)	Won	
2003	Spider-Man	2003 Kids' Choice Awards	Favorite Male Butt Kicker	Nominated	
2003	Spider-Man	2003 MTV Movie Awards	Best Male Performance	Nominated	
2003	Spider-Man	2003 MTV Movie Awards	Best Kiss (Note: Shared with Kirsten Dunst.)	Won	
2003	Spider-Man	2003 MTV Movie Awards	Best Fight (Note: Shared with Willem Dafoe.)	Nominated	
2003	Spider-Man	29th Saturn Awards	Best Actor	Nominated	
2004	Spider-Man 2 (video game)	2004 Spike Video Game Awards	Best Performance by a Human Male	Nominated	
2005	Spider-Man 2	10th Empire Awards	Best Actor	Nominated	
2005	Spider-Man 2	2005 Kids' Choice Awards	Favorite Movie Actor	Won	
2005	Spider-Man 2	31st People's Choice Awards	Favorite On-Screen Match-Up (Note: Shared with Kirsten Dunst.)	Nominated	
2005	Spider-Man 2	31st Saturn Awards	Best Actor	Won	
2007	Spider-Man 3	1st National Movie Awards	Best Performance by a Male	Nominated	
2007	Spider-Man 3	2007 Scream Awards	Best Superhero	Won	
2007	Spider-Man 3	2007 Teen Choice Awards	Choice Movie Actor: Action Adventure	Nominated	
2007	Spider-Man 3	2007 Teen Choice Awards	Choice Movie: Liplock (Note: Shared with Kirsten Dunst.)	Nominated	
2007	Spider-Man 3	2007 Teen Choice Awards	Choice Movie: Dance	Nominated	
2007	Spider-Man 3	2007 Teen Choice Awards	Choice Movie: Rumble (Note: Shared with New Goblin (James Franco) vs. Venom (Topher Grace) & Sandman (Thomas Haden Church).)	Nominated	
2008	Spider-Man 3	2008 MTV Movie Awards	Best Fight (Note: Shared with James Franco.)	Nominated	
2008	Spider-Man 3	34th People's Choice Awards	Favorite On Screen Match-Up (Note: Shared with Kirsten Dunst.)	Nominated	
2022	Spider-Man: No Way Home	2022 MTV Movie & TV Awards	Best Team (Note: Shared with Tom Holland and Andrew Garfield.)	Nominated	

== See also ==
- Spider-Man in film
