= Spider-Man: The Dragon's Challenge =

- British theatrical release poster
- Directed by: Don McDougall
- Written by: Lionel E. Siegel
- Based on: Spider-Man by: Stan Lee; Steve Ditko
- Produced by: Lionel E. Siegel
- Starring: Nicholas Hammond; Rosalind Chao; Robert F. Simon; Benson Fong; Ellen Bry
- Cinematography: Vincent A. Martinelli
- Edited by: Erwin Dumbrille; Fred Roth
- Music by: Dana Kaproff
- Production company: Danchuck Productions
- Distributed by: Columbia Pictures Television (United States); Columbia Pictures (International)
- Release dates: February 3, 1981 (Europe); May 9, 1981 (worldwide)
- Running time: 96 minutes
- Country: United States
- Language: English

Spider-Man: The Dragon's Challenge is a 1981 American superhero film that had a theatrical release abroad, a composite of the 1979 two-parter episode "The Chinese Web" of the contemporary television series The Amazing Spider-Man, released on May 9, 1981. It was directed by Don McDougall, written by Lionel E. Siegel, and stars Nicholas Hammond as the titular character, Rosalind Chao, Robert F. Simon, Benson Fong, and Ellen Bry. It is the sequel to Spider-Man (1977) and Spider-Man Strikes Back (1978).

This was the final Spider-Man film that was released theatrically outside of North America, as well as the final Spider-Man film overall, until Sony Pictures acquired the license in 1999 and released Spider-Man in 2002.

== Plot ==
Min Lo Chan, the Chinese Minister of Industrial Development, who happens to be an old college friend of J. Jonah Jameson, flees China and comes to the United States to locate three men who during the war approached him and offered him money for secrets about Mao Zedong, which he refused at the time. He stays with his niece Emily Chan, who lives in New York City. However, it appears the incident is now being investigated, and he needs to find one of them quickly to verify his innocence. He asks Mr. Jameson to help him find them, but he wants it done quietly because it seems that there are elements who want him convicted, so Jameson asks Peter Parker to find the three ex-Marines on his behalf, but also to talk to them discreetly. Meanwhile, back in Hong Kong, Charles Zeider, who is a wealthy industrialist, is among the ones being considered to build a power plant for the Chinese Government worth one billion dollars. However, he knows that Min Lo Chan is considering another company, but if he's convicted, his successor will award the contract to him. As a result, he sends Clyde Evans to make sure he does not return to China alive.

As Spider-Man, Peter saves Min's life several times. However, in one of the murder attempts, Min suffers a minor heart attack and has to remain under medical observation. To trick Evans, the Daily Bugle publishes the news stating that Min has died in the hospital.

Peter manages to contact the last of the Marines needed to clear Min's name, Professor Dent, who agrees to help as he also wants to clear his name. Along with Peter and Min's niece Emily, Dent flies to Hong Kong to testify, but Zeider has him kidnapped to ensure his silence. During an incident while chasing the kidnappers, Emily discovers that Peter Parker is Spider-Man. Finally, with Emily's help, Spider-Man traces Dent in Zeider's secret office at the top of a building. After defeating all of the henchmen, he captures Zeider and frees Dent. Peter Parker proceeds to return to the United States as Emily decides to stay in China and promises Peter not to reveal his secret identity.

== Cast ==
- Nicholas Hammond as Spider-Man / Peter Parker
- Robert F. Simon as J. Jonah Jameson
- Rosalind Chao as Emily Chan
- Benson Fong as Min Lo Chan
- Richard Erdman as Charles Zeider
- Ellen Bry as Julie Masters
- Chip Fields as Rita Conway
- John Milford as Professor Dent
- Hagan Beggs as Clyde Evans
- George Cheung as Doctor Pai
- Ted Danson as Major Collings
- Myron Healey as Lieutenant Olson
- Anthony Charnota as Quinn
- Tony Clark as Joe

== Release ==
The film was theatrically released in European territories on February 3, 1981, and in Australia where it screened at the Pix theatre among others, distributed by Hoyts. It received a VHS release in 1982.
