= Spider-Man (1977 film) =

- Australian theatrical release poster
- Based on: Spider-Man by: Stan Lee; Steve Ditko
- Written by: Alvin Boretz
- Directed by: E. W. Swackhamer
- Starring: Nicholas Hammond; David White; Michael Pataki
- Music by: Johnnie Spence
- Country of origin: United States
- Original language: English

Production
- Producers: Charles Fries; Daniel R. Goodman; Edward J. Montagne
- Cinematography: Fred Jackman, Jr.
- Editor: Aaron Stell
- Running time: 92 minutes
- Production company: Danchuck Productions

Original release
- Network: CBS
- Release: September 14, 1977

Spider-Man is a 1977 American television superhero film that aired on CBS and had a theatrical release outside the US, which serves as the pilot to the 1977 television series titled The Amazing Spider-Man. It was directed by E. W. Swackhamer, written by Alvin Boretz and stars Nicholas Hammond as the titular character, David White, Michael Pataki, Jeff Donnell and Thayer David.

It is the first Spider-Man film released by Columbia Pictures. Two sequels, Spider-Man Strikes Back and Spider-Man: The Dragon's Challenge, were released in 1978 and 1981, respectively.

== Plot ==
Peter Parker, a freelance photographer for the Daily Bugle, is bitten by a radioactive spider and discovers he has gained superpowers, such as super-strength, agility and the ability to climb sheer walls and ceilings. When a mysterious Guru places people under mind-control - including a doctor and lawyer - to rob banks, Peter becomes the costumed hero Spider-Man to stop the crook's fiendish scheme. The Guru then announces that he will hypnotize ten New Yorkers, chosen at random, into committing suicide unless the city pays him $50 million, which becomes a Daily Bugle headline, "Are You One of the Ten People?". The situation becomes even worse when Peter Parker and his friend Judy Tyler are hypnotized into being two of the people to defenestrate themselves from the Empire State Building by week's end. With some luck, Peter is able to break free of the hypnosis and then stop the Guru in his tracks.

== Cast ==
- Nicholas Hammond as Peter Parker / Spider-Man
- David White as J. Jonah Jameson
- Michael Pataki as Capt. Barbera
- Hilly Hicks as Joe "Robbie" Robertson
- Lisa Eilbacher as Judy Tyler
- Jeff Donnell as May Parker
- Robert Hastings as Monahan
- Ivor Francis as Professor Noah Tyler
- Thayer David as Edward Byron
- Len Lesser as Henchman
- Norman Rice as Henchman

== Production ==
The sequence in which Spider-Man (Nicholas Hammond) crawls across an office ceiling and jumps to the wall was accomplished using a complex set of rigging and cables hidden in tracks in the ceiling. Stunt grips lifted stuntman/stunt coordinator Fred Waugh to the ceiling and he then scuttled down the hallway using a slider track while the wire pressure pulled him upwards. The scene in which Spider-Man swings from building-to-building was extremely expensive and dangerous and required two days of rigging; to avoid having to repeat this, the stunt was filmed from multiple camera angles to create extra footage which could be used in future episodes of the TV series.

== Release and reception ==
The film premiered on CBS on September 14, 1977. It received a 17.8 rating with a 30 share, making it the highest performing CBS production for the entire year. Overseas, the film was theatrically released and distributed by Columbia Pictures. In the UK particularly, Spider-Man received both a standalone release and a reissue as the first film in a double-bill with Sinbad and the Eye of the Tiger. It received a VHS / Laserdisc release as a straight-to-video film in 1980. The film grossed $9 million at the overseas box office.

== Sequels ==
Spider-Man Strikes Back, a composite of the two-parter episode "Deadly Dust" of the contemporary television show The Amazing Spider-Man, screened in European theatres on 21 December 1978. A second sequel named Spider-Man: The Dragon's Challenge was also made and released in Europe and Australia.
