= The Amazing Spider-Man (TV series) =

1977–1979 American television series

- Genre: Superhero
- Created by: Alvin Boretz
- Based on: Spider-Man by: Stan Lee; Steve Ditko
- Directed by: Don McDougall Ron Satlof
- Starring: Nicholas Hammond; Robert F. Simon; Chip Fields; Ellen Bry
- Theme music composer: Stu Phillips; Dana Kaproff
- Composers: Stu Phillips; Dana Kaproff
- Country of origin: United States
- Original language: English
- No. of seasons: 2
- No. of episodes: 13

Production
- Production locations: Los Angeles, California, U.S.
- Cinematography: Fred Jackman Jr.
- Running time: 40–45 minutes
- Production companies: Charles Fries Productions; Dan Goodman Productions; Marvel Comics Group; Columbia Pictures Television

Original release
- Network: CBS
- Release: September 14, 1977 – July 6, 1979

Related
- Spidey Super Stories; Spider-Man (Japanese TV series)

The Amazing Spider-Man (known simply as Spider-Man for the second season) is an American superhero television series, based on the Marvel Comics character Spider-Man. It is the second live-action television series appearance of a Marvel character, after the Spidey Super Stories segment on The Electric Company. It originally aired on CBS in the United States from September 14, 1977 to July 6, 1979.

Though it was a considerable ratings success, the CBS series was cancelled after just 13 episodes, which included a pilot film airing in autumn of 1977.

== Cast and characters ==
The cast of Spider-Man, season 2.

=== Main ===
- Nicholas Hammond as Peter Parker / Spider-Man
- Robert F. Simon as J. Jonah Jameson
- Chip Fields as Rita Conway
- Michael Pataki as Capt. Barbera (season 1)
- Ellen Bry as Julie Masters (season 2)

David White played J. Jonah Jameson in the pilot TV movie, but the character was recast for the series proper, played by Robert F. Simon.

Jameson's secretary Rita Conway is essentially Gloria "Glory" Grant of the comics, with a different name. The character was possibly renamed in partial tribute to Glory Grant's co-creator, writer Gerry Conway (who wrote the comics The Amazing Spider-Man and The Spectacular Spider-Man in 1972-1975 and 1976-1977 respectively; Glory Grant debuted during Conway's run on The Amazing Spider-Man in 1975).

Hilly Hicks played Robbie Robertson of the Daily Bugle in the pilot TV movie but the character was not retained in the series. Hicks played a version of Robertson notably younger than his comic-book counterpart.

Peter Parker's Aunt May appeared in two episodes of the series; the character was played by Jeff Donnell in the pilot episode and by Irene Tedrow in the first season's fifth episode, “Night of the Clones.”

Capt. Barbera (played by Michael Pataki in the first season) and Julie Masters (played by Ellen Bry in the second) are original to the series rather than the Spider-Man comics.

== Production ==
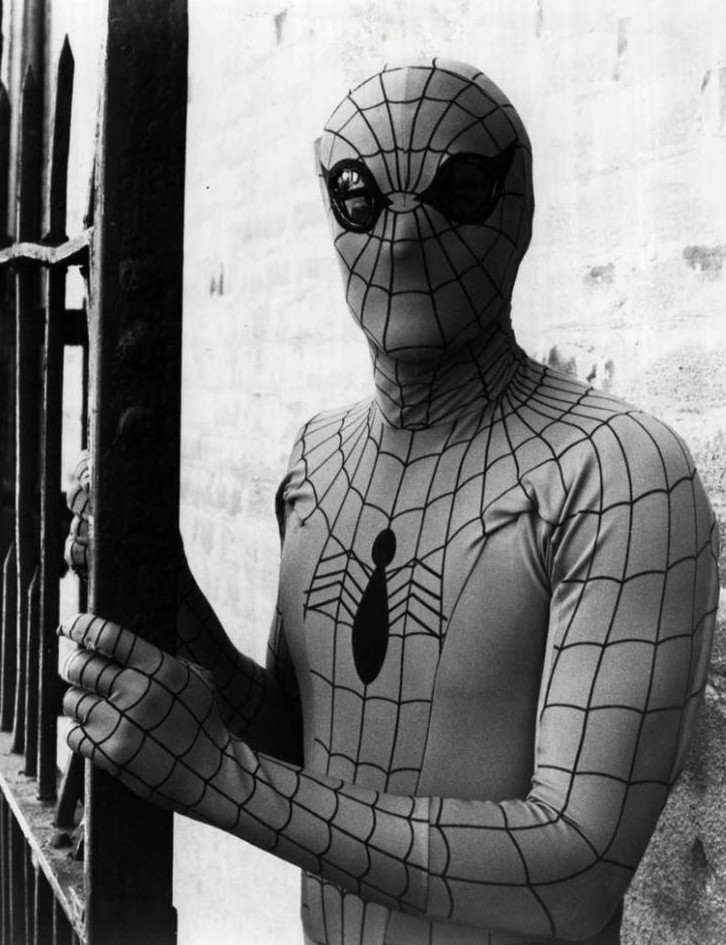
In the 1977 series, Spider-Man's wore reflective lenses

During the mid-1970s, Marvel Comics publisher and Spider-Man's co-creator Stan Lee, sold CBS the rights to produce a prime time live-action Spider-Man series, to be made by producer Daniel R. Goodman. Actor Nicholas Hammond was cast in the lead role, though all of Spider-Man's stunts were performed by the series's stunt coordinator, Fred Waugh. Lee and Goodman fiercely clashed over the direction of the series during the initial production. Lee once said in an interview for Pizzazz magazine that he felt the series was "too juvenile".

Despite its storylines being set in New York City (the character's hometown), the series was mostly filmed in Los Angeles.

The series began as a backdoor pilot: a 90-minute movie known simply as Spider-Man which was broadcast on CBS TV network in September 1977, which was theatrically released internationally. In it, Peter Parker (as an intrepid university student) gains super powers after being bitten by a radioactive spider. He uses those powers to get a job at the Daily Bugle, and to stop a con man who is covertly using mind control for personal gain.

The pilot garnered a 17.8 rating with a 30 share - CBS' highest rating for the entire year. However, citing concern over the pilot's relatively weak ratings in the lucrative adult-demographic (ages 18–49), CBS picked up the series for only a limited, five-episode order (those 5 episodes were aired in April and May 1978, at the tail-end of the 1977–78 TV season). This run of episodes debuted very well, with the first obtaining a 22.8 rating with 16.6 million viewers, making it the best-rated program for the week on CBS, and the eighth-best-rated program for the week, overall. The series ended up being the 19th-highest-rated show of the entire season, but CBS was reluctant to commit to giving the show a regular/fixed time slot for the 1978-79 season, as the series was expensive to produce and continued to underperform with older audiences.

CBS took the more cautious approach of airing episodes on a sporadic basis, strategically placing it on the broadcast schedule to deliberately hurt the ratings of specific competing shows, at key times in the TV season (e.g. "sweeps"). Former Six Million Dollar Man producer Lionel Siegel took over production duties for season two, noticeably changing the show in an attempt to grow its adult audience. These changes included dropping the Captain Barbera character; adding the character of Julie Masters as a love interest for Peter; creating more down-to-earth plotlines; and slightly toning-down Spider-Man's superpowers, to make him more accessible to adult viewers.

The second season that consisted of seven episodes aired infrequently throughout the 1978–79 TV season. The series continued to do well in the ratings during its second season. CBS officially cancelled the series soon after the season ended. The chief reason for the cancellation was that CBS feared being perceived as merely a one-dimensional, superficial, "superhero network". It was already airing other live-action superhero series or specials at the time, including The Incredible Hulk, Wonder Woman (which they resurrected after its original network, ABC, canceled it), Captain America, Doctor Strange, and had just ended (in 1977) multi-year runs of live-action Saturday morning series for DC Comics' Captain Marvel and Isis superheroes. Another problem was that in spite of the show's popularity, its most vocal fans were also highly critical of it, due to the season two departures from more comic book-like storylines, and the lack of any recognizable "supervillains" from the Spider-Man comics.

The series yielded the first live-action depictions of Peter Parker's "spider-tracer" tracking/homing devices; they are prominently featured in several episodes throughout the series.

=== Directors ===
Shooting Spider-Man at Caltech from "The Curse of Rava".

- Tom Blank
- Cliff Bole
- Michael Caffey
- Dennis Donnelly
- Tony Ganz
- Fernando Lamas
- Joseph Manduke
- Don McDougall
- Ron Satlof
- Larry Stewart
- E. W. Swackhamer

== Episodes ==
For their release in VHS format, several of the series's episodes were spliced together in pairs. "Night of the Clones and Escort to Danger", "A Matter of State and Photo Finish" and "The Con Caper and The Curse of Rava" were combined and presented as a single movie-length episodes. In order to smooth the jump between the two unrelated stories in each release, the production team filmed new bridging scenes set at the Daily Bugle and inserted them between the content of the two component episodes. These scenes were never broadcast, either in the series's original run or in any reruns.

The pilot and two pairs of episodes were released as movies internationally by Columbia Pictures (following their first character film rights for future films) as Spider-Man, Spider-Man Strikes Back, and Spider-Man: The Dragon's Challenge.

=== Pilot movie ===
Title	Directed by	Written by	Original release date
"Spider-Man"	E.W. Swackhamer	Alvin Boretz	September 14, 1977
University student Peter Parker is bitten by a radioactive spider and decides to use his super powers to stop an evil New Age guru that is turning law-abiding citizens into criminals through mind control. Guest starring David White, Lisa Eilbacher, Hilly Hicks, Thayer David, Ivor Francis, Jeff Donnell, and Bob Hastings. This pilot TV-movie was released theatrically overseas and saw VHS releases in the 1980s by CBS/Fox Video (and re-released later on Fox's own Playhouse Video label) and in the 1990s by Rhino Home Video. A CED videodisc version (CBS/Fox) was also released. In Japan only, this was also released on VHD format and laserdisc.

=== Season 1 (1978) ===
No. overall	No. in season	Title	Directed by	Written by	Original release date
1	1	"The Deadly Dust: Part 1"	Ron Satlof	Robert Janes	April 5, 1978
Upset that Professor Baylor has brought a small amount of plutonium oxide onto campus in order to give a class demonstration, three university students decide to steal the plutonium and build a bomb in order to illustrate the dangers of nuclear power. Before they can make their point, a mysterious international businessman and arms dealer named Mr. White steals the bomb to sell to the highest bidder. Guest stars Joanna Cameron, Robert Alda, and Randy Powell. Though it was the last of the five season one episodes to be filmed, it was the first to be broadcast. In countries outside the United States, such as the UK, Argentina, Australia and New Zealand, "The Deadly Dust" part 1 and 2 were edited together by Columbia Pictures and released in theaters as Spider-Man Strikes Back. "The Deadly Dust" saw video release in the 1980s by CBS/Fox Video (and re-released later on Fox's own Playhouse Video label) and in the late 1990s by Rhino Home Video. It was also released on videotape (in Europe) and laserdisc (in Japan) in its theatrical version, titled Spider-Man Strikes Back.
2	2	"The Deadly Dust: Part 2"	Ron Satlof	Robert Janes	April 12, 1978
Unable to find a suitable buyer for the atomic bomb he has stolen, Mr. White decides to take a different approach. He blackmails the United States for $1 billion and threatens to detonate the bomb where it will do the most damage if his demands aren't met. Meanwhile, Peter Parker (Nicholas Hammond), Gayle Hoffman (Joanna Cameron), and Mr. Jameson (Robert F. Simon) travel to Los Angeles to track down Mr. White (Robert Alda) and the bomb, but they soon discover that he intends to detonate the bomb where the President is giving a speech nearby and it's a race against time to thwart his plan.
3	3	"The Curse of Rava"	Michael Caffey	Dick Nelson, Robert Janes	April 19, 1978
When the Bolt Museum elects to display a statue of Rava, the Kalistani god of death, the Cult of Rava believes the display to be a blasphemy and plots to steal the idol. But the museum and its financial backer, J. Jonah Jameson, refuse to take the threat seriously, and Mr. Jameson is implicated in the attempted murder of the museum curator. Led by the telekinetic Mandak, the cult hopes to return the stolen idol to Kalistan and use it to ignite a civil war that will return the followers of Rava to political power. Guest starring Theodore Bikel, and Adrienne La Russa. "The Curse of Rava" was spliced together with "Con Caper" to form "Con Caper & The Curse of Rava" which was released on VHS and Beta from Prism Home Video in the mid 1980s and on VHS Rhino Home Video in the late 1990s. Con Caper/Rava was also released on Laserdisc in the USA by Prism around 1990.
4	4	"Night of the Clones"	Fernando Lamas	John W. Bloch	April 26, 1978
The committee awarding the prestigious Tovald Award for scientific achievement is meeting in New York to decide the winner, but a scientist whose controversial work in cloning has been overlooked by the committee for years has other ideas. Dr. Moon has secretly perfected human cloning and creates evil clones of both himself and the web slinger, who plot to kill the members of the committee - and Peter Parker. Guest starring Lloyd Bochner, Morgan Fairchild, and Karl Swenson. "Night of the Clones" and the episode following it, "Escort to Danger", were spliced together to make "Night of the Clones & Escort to Danger" which was released on VHS and Beta from Prism Home Video in the mid-1980s and on VHS from Rhino Home Video in the late 1990s. Clones/Escort was also released on laserdisc in the USA by Prism around 1990.
5	5	"Escort to Danger"	Dennis Donnelly	Duke Sandefur	May 3, 1978
While visiting New York City, the daughter of a recently elected pro-democracy Latin American President is kidnapped by those seeking a return of a fascist dictatorship. Guest starring BarBara Luna, Madeleine Stowe, Alejandro Rey, and Harold Sakata. The sequence in which Spider-Man runs from an exploding car is the only stunt in the series performed by Nicholas Hammond himself. "Escort to Danger", and the episode before it, "Night of the Clones" were spliced together to make "Night of the Clones & Escort to Danger" which was released on VHS from Prism Home Video in the mid-1980s and Rhino Home Video in the late 1990s.

=== Season 2 (1978–1979) ===
No. overall	No. in season	Title	Directed by	Written by	Original release date
6	1	"The Captive Tower"	Cliff Bole	Gregory S. Dinallo, Bruce Kalish, Philip John Taylor	September 5, 1978
Thieves steal ten million dollars from a new high-tech security building and use its computers to trap the people inside. Guest starring Fred Lerner and David Sheiner. Since there were no other hour-long episodes with which to combine it into a 2-hour movie, this episode is the most rarely seen of the series, the only reruns being on the Sci-Fi Channel in the 1990s. For the same reason, this is also the only episode that didn't get a VHS release.
7	2	"A Matter of State"	Larry Stewart	Howard Dimsdale	September 12, 1978
NATO defense plans are stolen and held for ransom by terrorists. Julie Masters accidentally gets a photograph of the ringleader of the gang and now Spider-Man has to protect Masters, while also trying to get the defense plans back. Guest starring John Crawford. This episode was released on VHS as "Photo Finish & A Matter of State" by Rhino Home Video.
8	3	"The Con Caper"	Tom Blank	Brian McKay, Gregory S. Dinallo	November 25, 1978
An imprisoned politician (William Smithers) is released and poses as a reformed humanitarian dedicated to prison reform in order to stage a break out of some prisoners and steal a hundred-million dollars. Andrew J. Robinson and Ramon Bieri also guest star. This episode was released on VHS and Beta by Prism Home Video in the mid-1980s and on VHS Rhino Home Video in the late 1990s as "Con Caper & Curse of Rava". Prism also released this combined version on laserdisc in the US in 1990.
9	4	"The Kirkwood Haunting"	Don McDougall	Michael Michaelian	December 30, 1978
Peter Parker is sent to the estate (complete with its own zoo) of a wealthy widow and longtime family friend of Mr. Jameson. The widow claims that she is being visited by the ghost of her dead husband and he is telling her to donate all her money to the group of men that are acting as objective investigators of paranormal phenomenon. This episode has been released on VHS by Rhino Home Video spliced together to make "Wolfpack & The Kirkwood Haunting".
10	5	"Photo Finish"	Tony Ganz	Howard Dimsdale	February 7, 1979
While doing a story on a rare coin collection, the coins are stolen in a robbery with one of the thieves wearing a wig and muffling his voice to appear to be the coin collector's bitter ex-wife. The photo that Parker has of the disguised thief will falsely frame the ex-wife and Parker is willing to go to jail in order to protect the innocent and break out of jail as Spider-Man to bring the thieves to justice. This episode has been released on VHS as "Photo Finish & A Matter of State" by Rhino Home Video. "Photo Finish" was previously released by itself (in its original one-hour format) on an LP-speed cassette from low-budget label Star Maker Home Video.
11	6	"Wolfpack"	Joseph Manduke	Stephen Kandel	February 21, 1979
When a greedy Sorgenson Chemical representative learns that University students have developed a mind control gas, he uses the gas to take control of the students and even some soldiers to commit crimes. This episode has been released on VHS on Rhino Home Video as "Wolfpack & The Kirkwood Haunting".
12	7	"The Chinese Web: Part 1"	Don McDougall	Lionel E. Siegel	July 6, 1979
An old college friend of Mr. Jameson fleeing China (where he is the Minister of Industrial Development) to live with his Chinese American niece because the Chinese government has falsely charged him with being a spy during World War II. While Peter Parker tries to prove the man's innocence he must contend with a henchmen of a British-Hong Kong businessman who will do anything to get a new Minister of Industrial Development who will ensure that his firm gets a lucrative business contract with Hong Kong. Guest starring Rosalind Chao, Hagan Beggs, Richard Erdman, John Milford, Benson Fong, George Cheung, and Ted Danson. While the rest of the series was filmed in New York and Los Angeles, the series finale includes many scenes which were filmed in Hong Kong. "The Chinese Web" part 1 and 2 was also released theatrically in many different territories from 1979 to 1981 under the title Spider-Man: The Dragon's Challenge. It was also released overseas on video (and on laserdisc in Japan) in its full version. This episode was released on its own on videotape by CBS/Fox Video in the early 1980s (and re-released later on Fox's own Playhouse Video label) and by Rhino Home Video in the late 1990s.
13	8	"The Chinese Web: Part 2"	Don McDougall	Lionel E. Siegel	July 6, 1979
Peter goes to Hong Kong with Dent and Emily so that Dent can prove Emily's uncle's innocence, but the industrialist tries to stop them.

== Revival attempt ==
In a 2002 interview with SFX magazine, Nicholas Hammond revealed that there were plans to do an Amazing Spider-Man series reunion film in 1984. The proposal would have had the original cast team-up with the cast of The Incredible Hulk television series (a major hit for CBS), with Hammond appearing in the black Spider-Man costume. According to Hammond, a deal was arranged to have Columbia and Universal Studios co-produce the project. Bill Bixby was going to direct the TV-movie, in addition to reprising the role of David Banner. Universal eventually cancelled the project. Hammond said he was told that Lou Ferrigno was unavailable to reprise his role as the Hulk, because he was in Italy filming Hercules. However, in his 2003 autobiography My Incredible Life as the Hulk, Ferrigno stated that he was never contacted about the project, adding that he had recently finished filming Hercules II and that his availability was not an issue.

== In other media ==
In 2026, comic book writer Dan Slott revealed that a story featuring Nicholas Hammond’s Spider‑Man and Christopher Reeve’s version of Superman was considered for the intercompany crossover Spider-Man/Superman. Marvel rejected the idea due to rights and licensing concerns, and Slott instead opted for a story set in the 1930s featuring Spider-Man Noir and the Golden Age Superman.
