= Spider-Man Strikes Back =

- British theatrical release poster
- Directed by: Ron Satlof
- Screenplay by: Robert Janes
- Based on: Spider-Man by: Stan Lee; Steve Ditko
- Produced by: Ran Satlof; Robert Janes
- Starring: Nicholas Hammond; Joanna Cameron; Robert F. Simon; Michael Pataki
- Cinematography: Jack Whitman
- Production company: Charles Fries Productions
- Distributed by: Columbia Pictures Television (United States); Columbia Pictures (International)
- Release dates: May 8, 1978 (Europe); December 21, 1978 (worldwide)
- Running time: 93 minutes
- Country: United States
- Language: English

Spider-Man Strikes Back is a 1978 American superhero film that had a theatrical release abroad, a composite of the two-parter episode "Deadly Dust" of the contemporary television show The Amazing Spider-Man, released on 8 May 1978. It was directed by Ron Satlof, written by Robert Janes, and stars Nicholas Hammond as the titular character, Robert Alda, Robert F. Simon, Joanna Cameron, and Michael Pataki. The film was preceded by Spider-Man and followed by Spider-Man: The Dragon's Challenge.

== Plot ==
The film begins with the FDNY, NYPD, and ambulances rushing to a building. A woman who has recently been in a failed relationship is about to end her life, but Spider-Man saves her at the last minute, to the applause of the crowd below. At the New York State University, Dr. Baylor, one of Peter Parker's tutors, announces that they are going to experiment using plutonium. A group of students, including Peter, is appalled as they think it's too dangerous. Later on, Peter meets an attractive journalist named Gale Hoffman, who is determined to get an interview with Spider-Man following his heroism in the distraught woman's rescue.

Later, three students steal some plutonium from the lab. They want to use the plutonium to build an atomic bomb to illustrate the dangers of nuclear power. Spider-Man appears on the scene in an unsuccessful attempt to stop them, but is seen by security guards. When one of the activists faints, the other two realize she has radiation poisoning and terminate their plans to rush her to the hospital. As a result, the police blame Spider-Man for the theft, while Inspector Decarlo accuses Peter Parker.

Meanwhile, in Switzerland, villain Mr. White reads a newspaper report of the theft and deduces that it was the students rather than Spider-Man who stole the radioactive material. He plans to steal the plutonium so that he can obtain his own version of the weapon. He departs immediately for the United States with his monstrous henchman, Angel.

White tries to kidnap Peter in an effort to locate the plutonium, but he manages to escape. Peter then gets arrested by the NYPD, but escapes detention as Spider-Man. White's henchmen engage in a fight against Spider-Man and hurl him off a twelve-story building, seemingly to his death. He saves himself by forming a net with his webbing, but in the confusion, White escapes with the bomb. Spider-Man is forced to defeat this scheming villain to stop him from blowing up Wall Street.

J. Jonah Jameson, the owner of The Daily Bugle, discovers that White has fled to Los Angeles and arranges for Peter Parker and Gale Hoffman to travel to the west coast in search of him. Mr. White demands $1,000,000,000 in return for not setting off the plutonium bomb in a heavily populated area. The authorities assume that he means New York City. In fact, White plans to set off the bomb in Los Angeles at the time the President is giving a speech there.

Spider-Man finally tracks White to his lair and learns of his plans. He locates the bomb and defuses it at the last second. However, White escapes and vows that he and Spider-Man will meet again.

== Cast ==
- Nicholas Hammond as Peter Parker / Spider-Man
- Chip Fields as Rita Conway
- Robert F. Simon as J. Jonah Jameson
- Robert Alda as Mr. White
- Michael Pataki as Capt. Barbera
- Joanna Cameron as Gale Hoffman
- Randolph Powell as Craig
- Anne Bloom as Carla Wilson
- Leigh Kavanaugh as Linda
- Lawrence P. Casey as Angel
- Sidney Clute as Inspector DeCarlo
- Emil Farkas as Karate Thug
- Simon Scott as Dr. Baylor
- Ron Hajak as Motorcycle Salesman

== Release ==
The film was theatrically released in European territories on 8 May 1978. It received a VHS release in 1980.

The theatrical version contains alternate edits of some of the fight sequences compared to the CBS television version. Most notably, the use of the nunchaku by martial artist Emil Farkas was edited out due to the weapon's illegality in many overseas jurisdictions. The original theatrical cut contains slightly more body contact in the fight scenes due to the restrictive censorship policy in place at CBS at the time. CBS allowed two pieces of "action" per 30 minutes of running time. An "action" was considered any violent contact, such as a single punch or a kick. However, CBS relaxed this policy slightly due to the fantastical nature of Spider-Man, but the TV edit was still limited. However, most home media releases of the film have contained the TV version of the fight scenes.

== Critical reception ==
From a contemporary review, Richard Combs of the Monthly Film Bulletin declared the film was a "cut-price Superman" finding that Nicholas Hammond as Peter Parker was a "good-natured earnestness one associates with Clark Kent, rather than with the gauche, spotty adolescent of the original character" and that the plot concentrates on the stunt-work with "sleek but unexciting villainy of Charlie's Angels is also lacking the stylistic wallop of the comic strip". The film has been noted for its low budget and lack of technical effects.

== Sequel ==
Spider-Man: The Dragon's Challenge, a composite of the two-parter episode "The Chinese Web" of the contemporary television show The Amazing Spider-Man, screened in European theaters on 3 February 1981.
