= Robert F. Simon =

American actor (1908–1992)

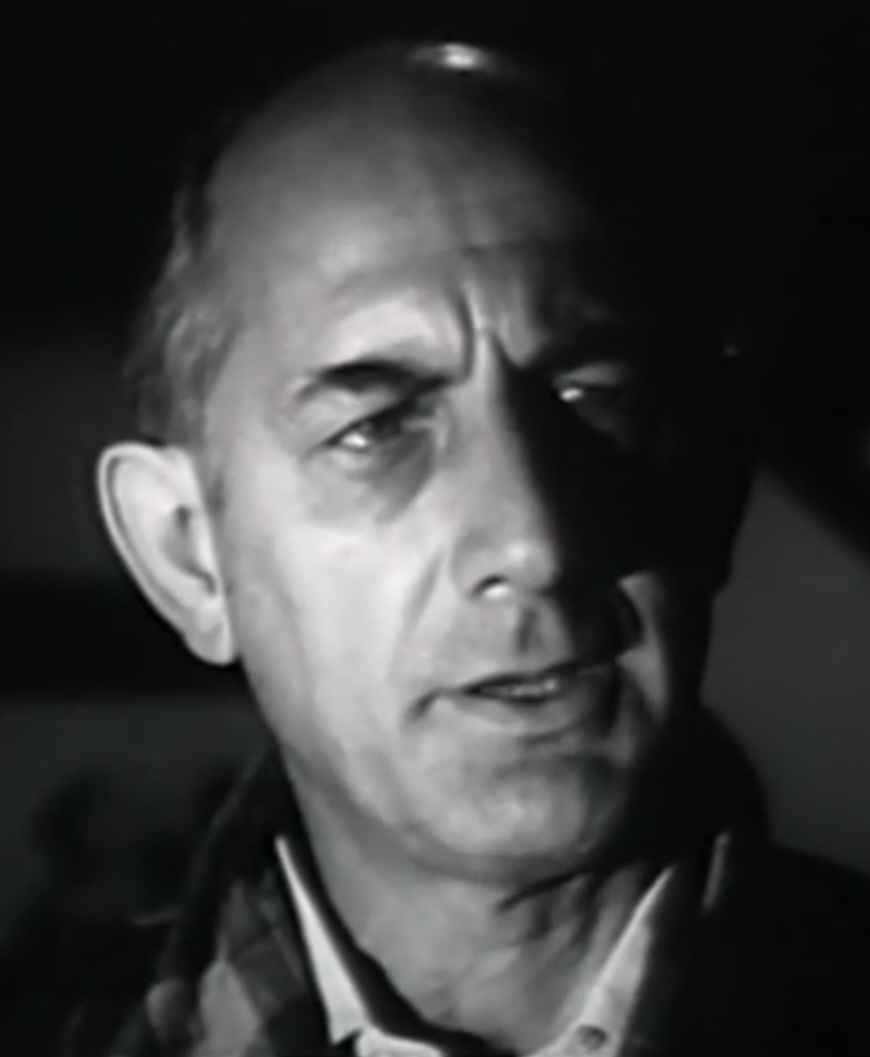
- Simon in an episode of Lock-Up (1960)
- Born: Robert Frank Simon; December 2, 1908; Mansfield, Ohio, U.S.
- Died: November 29, 1992 (aged 83); Tarzana, Los Angeles, California, U.S.
- Resting place: Oakwood Memorial Park Cemetery
- Occupation: Actor
- Years active: 1950–1985
- Known for: The Man Who Shot Liberty Valance; Edge of the City; The Amazing Spider-Man
- Spouse: Barbara Them (m. 1940; died 1974)
- Children: 4

Robert Frank Simon (December 2, 1908 – November 29, 1992) was an American character actor.

== Early years ==
Simon began acting with Mansfield, Ohio's Community Players organization in 1935, when he worked as a clerk in a meat market. Following that experience, he acted with the Cleveland Playhouse.

== Theater ==
Simon appeared on Broadway in Clifford Odets's play, Clash by Night. In 1949, he succeeded Lee J. Cobb as Willy Loman in Death of a Salesman. His other Broadway credits included Of Thee I Sing (1952), Sundown Beach (1948), On Whitman Avenue (1946), Truckline Cafe (1946), Brighten the Corner (1945), Mrs. January and Mr. X (1944), Apology (1943), and The Russian People (1942).

== Film and TV ==
=== 1950s–1970s ===
Simon began working in films and on television after he moved to Los Angeles in 1954.

In 1955, he appeared on television in episodes of Medic and Alfred Hitchcock Presents as well as such feature films as Chief Crazy Horse, Seven Angry Men, and The Court-Martial of Billy Mitchell.

In 1956 and 1957, he appeared in episodes of State Trooper, The Millionaire and M Squad. In 1957, he appeared in the Betty Hutton film Spring Reunion, and as George Nordmann in the feature film Edge of the City, starring John Cassavetes and Sidney Poitier. In 1958, Simon guest-starred as Captain Woods in "The Coward of Fort Bennett" on General Electric Theater. In 1957 and 1958, he appeared in four episodes of the anthology series, Playhouse 90. In 1959, he appeared on Peter Gunn and Adventures in Paradise. His other 1950s film credits included appearances in The Buccaneer (1958), Compulsion (1959), The Last Angry Man (1959) and Operation Petticoat (1959).

==== Westerns ====
From 1956 to 1970, Simon appeared in Broken Arrow, Disneyland, Dick Powell's Zane Grey Theatre, Laramie, Black Saddle, Law of the Plainsman, Johnny Ringo, Cheyenne, and The Dakotas, Wichita Town, The Man from Blackhawk, The Texan, Tombstone Territory, Tate, and Shotgun Slade, Stagecoach West, Bat Masterson, Lawman, Klondike, and Frontier Circus, Have Gun – Will Travel, Wagon Train, The Legend of Jesse James, The Road West, Gunsmoke ("Cheap Labor"-S2E32, "Potato Road"-S3E5, “Father’s Love” - S9E24 & "The Mission" - S12E4), Laredo, The Virginian, Bonanza, and The Guns of Will Sonnett. He portrayed Sheriff Morgan on Elfego Baca and General Alfred Terry on Custer.

In 1962, Simon played Mackie in the episode "House of the Hunter" on CBS's Rawhide. The same year he also portrayed Handy Strong in the feature film The Man Who Shot Liberty Valance.

==== Drama ====
Simon portrayed Dave Tobak on Saints and Sinners. He also appeared in such programs as Crusader, Route 66, Dante, The DuPont Show with June Allyson, Johnny Midnight, Straightaway, The Roaring 20s, Sea Hunt and State Trooper. In 1961 and 1962, he guest starred on episodes of Ripcord, The Dick Powell Show, The Lloyd Bridges Show, Cain's Hundred and Sam Benedict. In the controversial 1962 episode "The Benefactor" of the legal drama The Defenders, Simon played an unrepentant abortion care provider who uses his trial to argue for a change in the law. In 1966, he played Nazi officer Colonel Beckman in The Rat Patrol episode "The Exhibit A Raid".

Simon guest-starred three times on Perry Mason, including the role of murderer Edward Bannister in the 1958 episode, "The Case of the Desperate Daughter." Simon appeared as Harvey, friend of the main character Paul Driscoll in the 1963 The Twilight Zone episode "No Time Like the Past". In 1965, he appeared in episodes of Slattery's People, Voyage to the Bottom of the Sea, and Dr. Kildare.

During the 1960s, Simon performed as well in dramatic roles in several films, such as The Spiral Road (1962), Captain Newman, M.D. (1963), and Fate Is the Hunter (1964). In 1966, he starred too as Mr. Rellik in the Highway Safety Films' production The Third Killer. His role was that of a "Death" salesman charged with three accounts, including traffic fatalities.

==== Comedy ====
Simon portrayed Frank Stephens on Bewitched and Everett McPherson on Nancy, He also appeared in other sitcoms, such as Ichabod and Me, McHale's Navy, Mrs. G. Goes to College, Get Smart, and The Andy Griffith Show.

He appeared in A New Kind of Love (1963) starring Paul Newman and Joanne Woodward, as "Cervantes" in The Reluctant Astronaut (1967), and as a doctor in Private Duty Nurses (1971). He appeared in a 1970 episode of Love, American Style, in a 1971 episode of Nichols, starring James Garner, and a 1973 episode of The Partridge Family. In 1973, he made three guest appearances as General Maynard M. Mitchell on M*A*S*H.

=== Later roles ===
From 1969 to 1985, Simon appeared in Marcus Welby, M.D., The Mod Squad, The Interns, Barnaby Jones, The Six Million Dollar Man, Police Woman, Hawaii Five-O, Cannon, Ellery Queen, M*A*S*H, Columbo, McCloud, McMillan & Wife, Quincy, M.E., Eight Is Enough, and The Feather & Father Gang. He had a recurring role as Captain Rudy Olsen on The Streets of San Francisco and portrayed J. Jonah Jameson on The Amazing Spider-Man (1978–1979). His last television appearance was in a 1985 episode of Airwolf.

== Personal life ==
Simon was married to Barbara Them, a Mansfield native. They had four children.

== Death ==
Simon died of a heart attack in Tarzana, California on November 29, 1992. He was interred at Oakwood Memorial Park Cemetery in Chatsworth, California.

== Partial filmography ==
- Where the Sidewalk Ends (1950) - Inspector Nicholas Foley (uncredited)
- Bright Victory (1951) - Psychiatrist
- Roogie's Bump (1954) - Boxi
- The Black Dakotas (1954) - U.S. Marshal Whit Collins
- Rogue Cop (1954) - Ackerman
- Alfred Hitchcock Presents (1955) (Season 1 Episode 11: "Guilty Witness") - Sergeant Halloran
- Seven Angry Men (1955) - Colonel Lewis Washington
- Chief Crazy Horse (1955) - Jeff Mantz
- 5 Against the House (1955) - Old Guard (uncredited)
- Foxfire (1955) - Ernest Tyson
- The Girl in the Red Velvet Swing (1955) - Stage Manager
- The Court-Martial of Billy Mitchell (1955) - Admiral Gage
- The Benny Goodman Story (1956) - Papa Dave Goodman
- Never Say Goodbye (1956) - Dr. Kenneth Evans
- The Catered Affair (1956) - Mr. Joe Halloran
- Bigger Than Life (1956) - Dr. Norton
- The First Traveling Saleslady (1956) - Cal - Texas Rancher
- The Rack (1956) - Law Officer
- Edge of the City (1957) - George Nordmann
- Spring Reunion (1957) - Harry Brewster
- Steve Canyon (1958) - Col. Hampton - Season 1/Episode 12: "Pilot Error"
- Gunman's Walk (1958) - Sheriff Harry Brill
- The Buccaneer (1958) - Captain Brown
- Compulsion (1959) - Police Lieutenant Johnson
- Face of Fire (1959) - The Judge
- The Last Angry Man (1959) - Lyman Gattling
- Operation Petticoat (1959) - Captain J.B. Henderson
- Pay or Die (1960) - Police Commissioner
- The Facts of Life (1960) - Motel Clerk
- The Wizard of Baghdad (1960) - Shamadin
- Tess of the Storm Country (1960) - Mr. Graves
- Sea Hunt (1961, Season 4, Episodes: 14 & 35) - Dr.Tomaso Ricou / Professor Aaron Halliday
- Straightaway (1962, Episodes "Sounds of Fury") - Venable
- The Man Who Shot Liberty Valance (1962) - Handy Strong
- The Spiral Road (1962) - Dr. Martens
- The Twilight Zone (1963, Season 4, Episode 10 "No Time Like the Past") - Harvey
- Wall of Noise (1963) - Dave McRaab
- A New Kind of Love (1963) - Bertram Chalmers, Sherman's Boss
- Captain Newman, M.D. (1963) - Lieutenant Colonel M.B. Larrabee
- Fate Is the Hunter (1964) - Proctor
- Across the River (1965) - Policeman
- Blindfold (1966) - Police Lieutenant
- The Reluctant Astronaut (1967) - Cervantes
- Private Duty Nurses (1971) - Dr. Sutton
- Hawaii Five-O (1975, Episode "Computer Killer") - Hugh Tilles
- Tail Gunner Joe (1977) - Drew Pearson
- Spider-Man Strikes Back (1978) - J. Jonah Jameson
