= Women in refrigerators =

Literary trope

"Women in refrigerators" is a term coined by Gail Simone in 1999 to describe a literary trope which involves established female characters facing disproportionate harm, such as maiming, assault, or even death, to serve as plot devices to motivate male characters, an event colloquially known as "fridging". Simone's original list of over 100 affected female characters, published on the "Women in Refrigerators" website, sparked discussions on sexism in pop culture and the comic-book industry. The trope's influence extends beyond comics, with critiques of its presence in film and television franchises. Notably, author Catherynne M. Valente, inspired by Gwen Stacy's portrayal in The Amazing Spider-Man 2, wrote The Refrigerator Monologues, addressing the trope's impact on female characters in superhero narratives.

== History ==
The term was coined by comic-book fan (and later writer) Gail Simone in 1999, named after an incident in "Forced Entry", Green Lantern vol. 3 #54 (1994), written by Ron Marz. The story includes a scene in which the title hero, Kyle Rayner, comes home to his apartment to find that the villain Major Force had killed Rayner's girlfriend, Alexandra DeWitt, and stuffed her corpse into a refrigerator. It describes a trend that Simone had recognized in comic book stories where female characters would be killed, maimed, sexually assaulted, depowered, or would experience other "life-derailing tragedies" disproportionately more often than male characters. She also emphasized that while male superheroes typically experience noble deaths or resurrection, the violence against superheroines is most often for shock value and has permanent consequences. It was not until later that the violence against women in these stories was recognized as a motivating incident, or plot device, for stories about male characters. The event is colloquially known as "fridging".

=== Women in Refrigerators website ===
Simone developed a list of over 100 female characters who had been subject to various life-derailing tragedies, publishing it on a website called "Women in Refrigerators". The site was designed by journalist Beau Yarbrough, maintained by Rob Harris and John Norris, and was originally hosted by Jason Yu, who had first suggested publishing the list online. Simone published email exchanges with respondents on the site. While some respondents found different meanings for the list, Simone maintained, until it was recognized as a motivating incident, that her initial point had always been: "If you demolish most of the characters girls like, then girls won't read comics. That's it!"

In 2000, several national newspapers ran articles that referenced the site, generating discussion on the topic of sexism in pop culture and the comic-book industry. Some universities also list the content of Women in Refrigerators as related to analysis and critique of pop culture.

==== Creator response ====
Simone received numerous email responses from comic book fans and professionals, publishing many of them on her website. Notable examples include writer Mark Millar, former DC Entertainment CCO Geoff Johns, and Ron Marz, the author of the incident that gave rise to the trope's name. Marz's reply stated (in part): "To me the real difference is less male-female than main character-supporting character. In most cases, main characters, 'title' characters who support their own books, are male. ... the supporting characters are the ones who suffer the more permanent and shattering tragedies. And a lot of supporting characters are female." He also further explained:

I created her [Alexandra DeWitt] with the intention of having her be murdered at the hands of Major Force. I took a lot of care in building her as a character, because I wanted her to be liked and her death to mean something to the readers. I wanted readers to be horrified at the crime, and to empathize with Kyle's loss. Her death was meant to bring brutal realization to Kyle that being GL [Green Lantern] wasn't fun and games. It was also meant to sever his links with his old life, paving the way for his move to New York. And ultimately I wanted her death to be memorable and illustrate just how truly heinous Major Force was. Thus the fridge.

==== "Dead Men Defrosting" ====
Cover art for "Beyond the Silent Night", Crisis on Infinite Earths #7 (1985)

In response to fans who argued that male characters are also often killed, content editor John Bartol wrote "Dead Men Defrosting", an article arguing that when male heroes are killed or altered, they are more typically returned to their status quo. According to Bartol's claim, after most female characters are altered they are "never allowed, as male heroes usually are, the chance to return to their original heroic states. And that's where we begin to see the difference."

Site maintainer Harris argued a similar point as Bartol:

Yes, male characters die, as do female characters - but my classic example is Flash and Supergirl, two beloved characters who were both killed off in the ["Crisis on Infinite Earths" storyline]. But Flash remained 'in continuity,' remembered and revered for his heroic sacrifice even as Wally West took on his mantle; Supergirl was forgotten, and within several months was wiped from continuity completely - no memorials, no flashbacks, no legacy.

At the time, the rationale was to restore Superman's status as the "only survivor of Krypton" and several characters with other backstories replaced Kara Zor-El as "Supergirl". The Kryptonian character was finally restored in 2006 in order to simplify the title's origin story.

Discussing the site in his book Dangerous Curves: Action Heroes, Gender, Fetishism and Popular Culture, Bowling Green State University professor Jeffrey A. Brown noted that while male comic book heroes have tended to die heroically and be magically brought back from the dead afterwards, female characters have been likelier to be casually but irreparably wounded or killed, often in a sexualized fashion. To support his claim, he cited the Joker shattering the original Batgirl's spine just for fun, resulting in her being written as a wheelchair user for over a decade. He also cites the torture and murder of Stephanie Brown by the villain Black Mask.

== In popular culture ==
Outside of the comic book medium, Marvel Entertainment and Marvel Studios have been criticized for their continued use of the trope in film and television franchises. Namely Gwen Stacy in The Amazing Spider-Man 2; Thor's mother, Frigga, in Thor: The Dark World; In 2016's Captain America: Civil War, an elderly Peggy Carter dies offscreen after suffering from Alzheimer's disease. Her death fuels Captain America's actions during the film, though she is later seen again in the Marvel Cinematic Universe franchise in 2019's Avengers: Endgame, when Captain America travels back in time to marry her; Peter Quill's mother Meredith in Guardians of the Galaxy; Gamora in Avengers: Infinity War, which was also used as a motivating tragedy for Quill in Guardians of the Galaxy Vol. 3. Gamora's death and storyline has also been criticized for its problematic suggestion that her abuser, the villain Thanos, cared for her despite his abuse; Natasha Romanoff in Avengers: Endgame; Maria Hill in Secret Invasion; Aunt May in Spider-Man: No Way Home; and Queen Ramonda in Black Panther: Wakanda Forever.

In the original cut of Deadpool 2, Deadpool's girlfriend, Vanessa, was initially killed and used as a plot device to motivate Deadpool. Due to negative fan reactions during test screenings, a new post-credits scene was filmed and added. Vanessa is saved by use of time-travel, avoiding the trope. Nonetheless, the deaths of Cable's wife and daughter are used as motivating incidents for Cable's story arc during the film.

Brian Tallerico of Vulture, when reviewing "The Whole World Is Watching", an episode of the 2021 live-action Disney+ miniseries The Falcon and the Winter Soldier, was critical of the death of Lemar Hoskins, a black person, as an example of racial, rather than sexist, fridging, to further the story arc of John Walker, a white person.

Courtney Enlow, editor at Your Tango, criticized the death of Kathy Stabler, the wife of detective Elliot Stabler in Law & Order: Special Victims Unit, as an example of the "tired, sexist" trope.

Christopher Nolan has been criticized for repeatedly using the trope in his films.

During the 2009 DC Comics storyline "Blackest Night", Alexandra DeWitt was one of many deceased characters temporarily brought back to life as part of the Black Lantern Corps. While she appeared briefly, she was seen inside a refrigerator construct at all times.

=== The Refrigerator Monologues ===
Cover art for The Refrigerator Monologues a graphic novel

Catherynne M. Valente was frustrated with the portrayal of Gwen Stacy's death in 2014's The Amazing Spider-Man 2, inspiring her to write the novel The Refrigerator Monologues, named in part after the "women in refrigerators" trope. She said of the portrayal of the character's death:

[I]t blindsided me in a way that Gwen Stacy taking her dive should never blindside anyone born after 1970, and it was a sucker punch, because more or less the last thing Emma Stone [as Gwen Stacy] does before she quite literally flounces off to meet her doom is snit, "Nobody makes my decisions for me, nobody! This is my choice. Mine." ... [S]omeone chose to give her those words. ... To make those powerful words the punchline to a sad joke about female agency by punishing her for them, by making sure that no matter how modern and independent the new Gwen might seem, everything is just as it has always been. That old, familiar message slides into our brains with the warm familiarity of a father's hug: when women make their own choices, disaster results.

The story chronicles the afterlives of characters who had died as a result of their associations with male superhero characters. The protagonists are parodies of famous characters who have suffered fridging in DC and Marvel comic books.

In December 2018, Deadline Hollywood reported that Amazon Studios was developing a television adaptation of The Refrigerator Monologues, to be entitled Deadtown. The story centers upon five recently deceased women who meet in a purgatory-like location called Deadtown, where they discover that their entire lives, including their deaths, were merely in service of providing emotional backstory for male superheroes.

== See also ==
- Bury your gays – Trope in fiction
- Comic book death – Term for a non-permanent character death
- Damsel in distress – Trope and stock character in storytelling
- Feminist literary criticism – Literary criticism informed by feminist theory
- The Hawkeye Initiative – Satirical Tumblr page
- Manic Pixie Dream Girl – Female stock character who acts as a love interest
- Portrayal of women in American comics
- Redshirt (stock character) – Character who is quickly killed off
