= Alexandra DeWitt =

- Alexandra Dewitt as she first appeared on Green Lantern vol. 3, #48 (January 1994)

Publication information
- Publisher: DC Comics
- First appearance: Green Lantern vol. 3, #48 (January 1994)
- Created by: Ron Marz; Bill Willingham

In-story information
- Full name: Alexandra DeWitt
- Species: Human
- Place of origin: Earth
- Team affiliations: Black Lantern Corps
- Partnerships: Kyle Rayner
- Supporting character of: Kyle Rayner
- Notable aliases: Black Hand

Alexandra DeWitt is a fictional character appearing in American comic books published by DC Comics. She is the girlfriend of Kyle Rayner before he receives the Green Lantern power ring from Ganthet. She is best known, however, as the murder victim whose manner of disposal led writer Gail Simone to coin the phrase "women in refrigerators". DeWitt first appears with Kyle at the end of Green Lantern vol. 3, #48 (January 1994).

== Fictional character history ==
=== Time with Kyle Rayner ===
As a photographer for a major newspaper in Los Angeles, Alex is annoyed by Kyle's somewhat immature attitude towards work. When Kyle reveals the new ring he has received, she is at first apprehensive, but she agrees to help Kyle train himself to use his new powers. Alex's time with Kyle is short-lived, however. Kyle returns home to find that Major Force has strangled Alex and stuffed her in the refrigerator.

=== After death ===
In Kyle's first encounter with Hal Jordan as Parallax, Hal offers to resurrect Alex as part of his plan to recreate the universe, but Kyle rejects the offer. When Kyle moves to New York and joins the Titans, he falls asleep while watching the monitors and his ring makes a projection of Alex. Later, when the demon Neron attacks, he attempts to entice Kyle by offering to resurrect Alex. Kyle, having already rejected the same offer from Hal, similarly refuses Neron's offer. In a Green Lantern Annual, Kyle and Hal relive each other's lives, causing Kyle to be in Hal's body during his early days as Green Lantern, while Hal is in Kyle's body during the time in which Alex is still his girlfriend. Major Force attacks Alex, but Hal is able to prevent him from killing her. When Kyle and Hal are returned to their respective bodies and return to the present, Alex is once again deceased.

Alex as a Green Lantern, as depicted on the cover to Green Lantern and Green Lantern #1, part of the story arc "Green Lantern: Circle of Fire".

A different version of Alex appears in the story arc "Green Lantern: Circle of Fire", where Kyle summons six different versions of Green Lantern to help him fight the villain Oblivion. One of these Green Lanterns is Alexandra DeWitt, who was believed to be from an alternate reality where she, rather than Kyle, acquired a Green Lantern ring. She is later revealed to be a sentient construct of Kyle's ring representing Kyle's positive aspect for love.

Another version of Alex appears by Ion #3 as one of the projections made from Mogo's power and Kyle's subconscious.

Jade, another of Kyle's deceased loves, and reanimated as an undead Black Lantern, created a black energy construct crafted in an image of Alex from her black ring to torment Kyle. Alex's remains become a Black Lantern later, trapping Kyle inside a black energy construct of a refrigerator before using her powers to take control of his body, transforming him into a facsimile of Major Force, and forcing him to relive the moments of her death. She tries to mentally break Kyle by saying that, since Force attacked her because of him, he essentially killed her himself. After what happened with Jade, Kyle does not fall prey to the same manipulation. With the help of the Indigo Tribesman Munk, he destroys her after saying goodbye.

== Woman in refrigerator syndrome ==
Because of the brutal manner in which Alex is killed, and because of the different 'significant others' of superheroes that are constantly in danger of being killed, women in the series who are killed in a particularly violent manner, to further a male hero's story, are said to have suffered from the woman in refrigerator syndrome.

Alexandra was reimagined as Samantha Dean in The Refrigerator Monologues.

== In other media ==
Alex DeWitt will appear in My Adventures with Green Lantern.

== See also ==
- Portrayal of women in American comics
