= Peter Parker (The Amazing Spider-Man film series) =

Film character portrayed by Andrew Garfield

- Marc Webb's The Amazing Spider-Man and Marvel Cinematic Universe character
- Promotional image of Andrew Garfield as Peter Parker/Spider-Man as depicted in The Amazing Spider-Man (2012)
- First appearance: The Amazing Spider-Man (2012)
- Last appearance: Spider-Man: Across the Spider-Verse (2023)
- Based on: Spider-Man by: Stan Lee; Steve Ditko
- Adapted by: James Vanderbilt; Alvin Sargent; Steve Kloves
- Portrayed by: Andrew Garfield; Max Charles (young)
- Voiced by: Sam Riegel (Note: Riegel voiced the character in the video game film tie-ins, The Amazing Spider-Man (2012) and The Amazing Spider-Man 2 (2014).); Andrew Chaikin (Note: Chaikin voiced the character in the mobile version of the video game film tie-in, The Amazing Spider-Man (2012).); Yuri Lowenthal (Note: Lowenthal voiced the character in the mobile version of the video game film tie-in, The Amazing Spider-Man 2 (2014).)

In-universe information
- Alias: Spider-Man
- Nickname: Peter-Three
- Species: Human mutate
- Occupation: Superhero; High school student; Freelance photographer; Research assistant
- Weapon: Web shooters
- Family: Richard Parker (father); Mary Parker (mother); May Parker (aunt; legal adoptive mother); Ben Parker (uncle; legal adoptive father)
- Significant other: Gwen Stacy
- Nationality: American

Peter Benjamin Parker, also known by his alias Spider-Man, is a fictional character and the protagonist of Marc Webb's The Amazing Spider-Man film series. Adapted from the Marvel Comics superhero of the same name, he is portrayed by Andrew Garfield and appears in the films The Amazing Spider-Man and its sequel, The Amazing Spider-Man 2, as well as being a supporting character in the Marvel Studios film Spider-Man: No Way Home (2021), set in the Marvel Cinematic Universe, appearing as an older version of himself alongside two alternate versions of himself from the wider multiverse.

Garfield's version of the character is a successor to the version of Peter Parker portrayed by Tobey Maguire in Sam Raimi's Spider-Man trilogy (2002–2007) and a predecessor to the version of Peter Parker portrayed by Tom Holland in the MCU (2016–present), who both appeared as their versions of Spider-Man alongside Garfield in No Way Home. To distinguish him from the other two Spider-Men, he is nicknamed "Peter-Three" by his counterparts in the film, and is referred to by Marvel's official website as The Amazing Spider-Man, and by Chris McKenna and Erik Sommers in the screenplay as "Webb-verse Peter" and "Webb-verse Spider-Man".

Garfield's iteration of the character had some differences in personality from the Spider-Man of the previous film series, being more of an angst-ridden loner haunted by his actions. The narrative of the duology centers around Parker struggling to maintain his double-life as Spider-Man and relationship with fellow student Gwen Stacy, whose death at the hands of his former friend Harry Osborn he believes himself responsible for. The narrative also focuses on Parker seeking to uncover the truth behind the disappearance of his parents Richard and Mary, who left him in the care of his aunt and uncle as a child, alongside the nature of his father's work at Oscorp. In No Way Home this portrayal was abandoned in order to depict Parker as a tortured individual who learns to let go of the emotional pain of Gwen's death and forgive himself after meeting two other versions of himself.

Garfield's portrayal of Parker received very positive responses and is commonly seen as a highlight of The Amazing Spider-Man series. His chemistry with Emma Stone has also been widely praised. Since Garfield's appearance in Spider-Man: No Way Home, fans have launched a campaign for the cancelled The Amazing Spider-Man 3 to be made.

== Development and execution ==
=== Previous films and rebooting Spider-Man ===
Peter Parker, also known as Spider-Man, first appeared in the anthology comic book Amazing Fantasy No. 15 (Aug. 1962) in the Silver Age of Comic Books, later becoming one of Marvel Comics' most popular superheroes and gaining his own comic series, titled The Amazing Spider-Man. He was eventually adapted to film and television numerous times. Prior to the release of the 2012 Amazing Spider-Man film, the preceding big-budget film series based on the character saw Tobey Maguire take on the role of Peter Parker / Spider-Man, with three films released by Columbia Pictures: Spider-Man, Spider-Man 2, and Spider-Man 3, which were released between 2002 and 2007.

Following the release of Spider-Man 3, Sony Pictures Entertainment had announced a May 5, 2011, release date for Sam Raimi's next film in the series. By this time, screenwriters James Vanderbilt, David Lindsay-Abaire, and Gary Ross had all written rejected versions of a script and Ziskin's husband Alvin Sargent, who wrote the second and third films, was working on yet another attempt. However, on January 11, 2010, Columbia Pictures and Marvel Studios announced that rather than continue the earlier saga, they were rebooting the series with a new cast and crew. Industry reports claimed that Raimi had admitted that he could not meet the scheduled release date and retain creative integrity. Avi Arad, Matt Tolmach, and Ziskin continued as producers.

The week after Raimi's departure, the studio announced that Marc Webb, whose previous film 500 Days of Summer was his directorial debut, would direct the reboot. Tolmach, having been made president of Columbia Pictures and Amy Pascal, co-chairman of Sony Pictures Entertainment, said they were looking for a director who could give "sharp focus" to Parker's civilian life. Despite initially being hesitant due to the cultural impact of the previous films, Webb accepted the offer. Webb stated in a press release that he did not intend to replace Raimi, instead saying that he sought to take the opportunity to add "...ideas, stories, and histories that will add a new dimension, canvas, and creative voice to Spider-Man". Webb compared Spider-Man to the James Bond franchise, saying that there was "...so much material in Spider-Man that there are so many stories to tell and so many characters". He denied that the film was a remake, explaining that they were envisioned as being a "different universe and a different story with different characters".

=== Casting ===
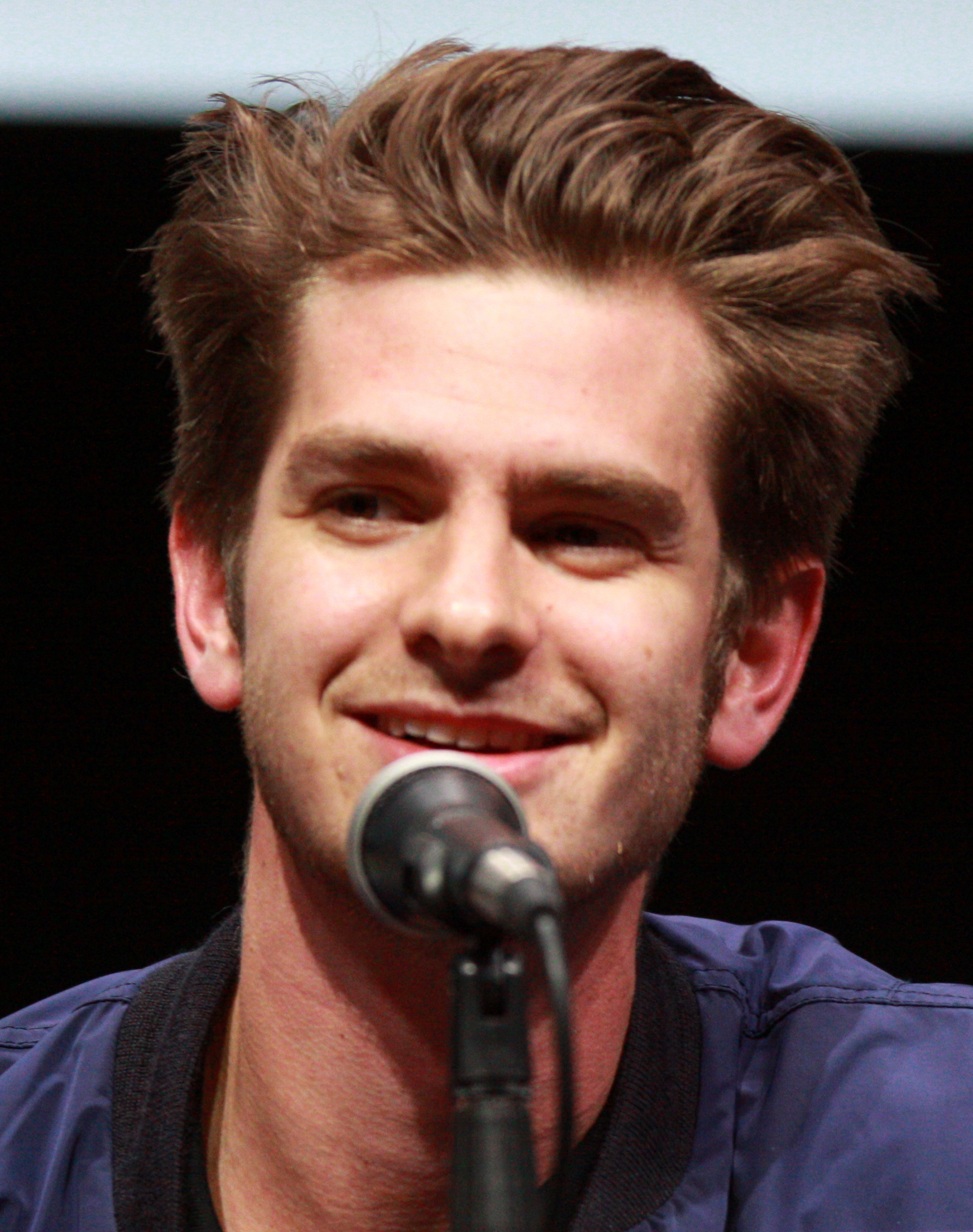
Andrew Garfield portrayed Peter Parker/Spider-Man in the Marc Webb film series and the Marvel Cinematic Universe (MCU) film Spider-Man: No Way Home.

British-American actor Andrew Garfield was cast as Peter Parker/Spider-Man for the 2012 film and its sequel, with his casting being officially made on July 1, 2010. Other actors considered for the role were Jamie Bell, Alden Ehrenreich, Frank Dillane, and Josh Hutcherson. Webb stated he knew Garfield was the right choice after filming him in a cutscene eating a cheeseburger while trying to calm Gwen Stacy down. On accepting the role Garfield explained, "I see it as a massive challenge in many ways ... To make it authentic. To make the character live and breathe in a new way. The audience already has a relationship with many different incarnations of the character. I do, as well. I'm probably going to be the guy in the movie theater shouting abuse at myself. But I have to let that go. No turning back. And I wouldn't want to." Max Charles plays a young Peter Parker in the film, with Webb stating that a young Peter was needed to "explain the origins of Peter Parker" and not just Spider-Man. After taking the role, Garfield studied the movements of athletes and spiders, and tried to incorporate them, saying Parker is "a boy/spider in terms of how he moves, and not just in the suit". He did yoga and Pilates for the role to be as flexible as possible. When first wearing his costume, Garfield admitted to shedding tears and trying to imagine "a better actor in the suit", which he described as "uncomfortable" and admitted to wearing nothing beneath it since it is skintight. Garfield also performed some of his own stunts in the film. When filming Garfield explained that he had four months of training and described his physical roles on stunts as terribly challenging and exhausting. Film producer Avi Arad explained that "Andrew is not only a brilliant actor but he is a sportsman. This gave us the opportunity to try things with him that were it not so it would have been almost impossible."

Following the release of The Amazing Spider-Man 2, Garfield was allegedly let go of the role after failing to appear for a crucial appearance, according to documents released in the aftermath of the 2014 Sony Pictures hack. Other reasons cited included creative differences with Sony Pictures management and a failure to adapt to Hollywood culture. In addition, the second film saw mixed reviews and a franchise-low in box-office revenue. After leaked information from the hack also indicated Sony to be in talks to have Sam Raimi direct Spider-Man vs. The Amazing Spider-Man, a multiversal crossover film featuring Garfield's Spider-Man encounter Tobey Maguire's Spider-Man, as well as a new trilogy starring Maguire; and to also be in talks with Marvel Studios about integrating a rebooted version of Spider-Man into the Marvel Cinematic Universe (MCU), beginning with Captain America: Civil War (2016), a deal was reached in early 2015 between the two studios to make the latter official, effectively cancelling The Amazing Spider-Man franchise.

Despite the reboot of the Spider-Man film series, Garfield reprised his role in Spider-Man: No Way Home (2021), a film set in the MCU, appearing alongside Maguire's iteration of the character as a supporting character to the new MCU iteration of Spider-Man played by Tom Holland. It had been reported in 2020 that Garfield would reprise his role as his version of Peter Parker alongside the other cinematic iterations of the character in the third MCU Spider-Man film, but these reports were never confirmed by Sony or Marvel Studios and were publicly denied by both Holland and Garfield several times in order to keep their involvement in the film a secret. In an interview with Variety that was published on January 6, 2022, Garfield said that his experience working on Spider-Man: No Way Home was "joyful", and that it gave him closure with his version of the character. Tom Holland described the inclusion of his Spider-Man predecessors Garfield and Tobey Maguire in Spider-Man: No Way Home 'was an idea that seemed impossible' before it came to fruition. Holland has also stated he regretted not contacting Garfield after he initially succeeded him in the role and felt lucky that Spider-Man: No Way Home had given both actors a second chance to discuss the Spider-Man character.

=== Powers and suit design ===
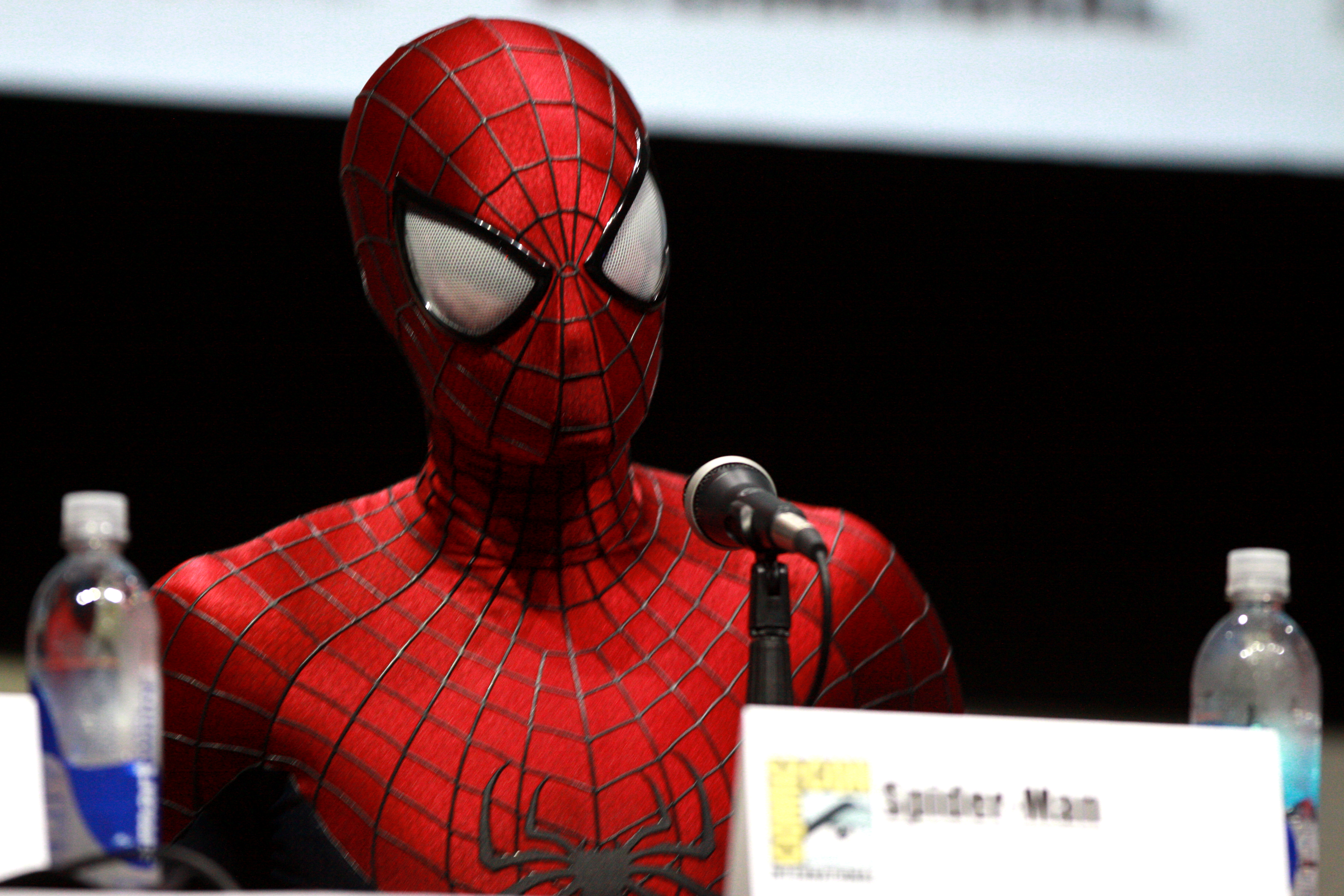
Top: Peter Parker's first Spider-Man suit, as seen The Amazing Spider-Man. Note the mechanical web shooters and athletic shoes in the design.
Bottom: Garfield in-character as Spider-Man at the 2013 San Diego Comic-Con, wearing the redesigned suit from The Amazing Spider-Man 2.

Like all other versions of the character, this iteration of Parker has superhuman physical abilities, reflexes, and senses, and is able to crawl on walls. Unlike the Spider-Man of the previous series, this iteration of the character is unable to shoot organic webs from his arms, relying on self-designed mechanical web shooters attached to his suit. Webb explained that he felt that the web-shooters were "able to dramatize Peter's intellect".

During the design process for the spandex Spider-Man suit used in The Amazing Spider-Man, Webb put an emphasis on making the suit look as if it was made by a high-school student. This was shown through decisions such as making the lenses for the eyes from a pair of sunglasses. Webb explained that he and the crew wanted a design that would make the body look more acrobatic, with the "legs of the spider [symbol on the chest]" used to emphasize it. Webb revealed that the film used varying suits for different lighting conditions. The webbing on the costume was also made darker.

The suit was more streamlined in The Amazing Spider-Man 2, emphasizing updates supposedly made by Peter and Gwen in between the two films. Changes included larger lenses in the mask and modified web shooters, in addition to some modifications allowing Garfield to use the restroom while in the suit.

== Characterization and analysis ==
As portrayed in The Amazing Spider-Man and its sequel, Peter is described as an "arrogant, misunderstood outsider", as well as "whip-smart and likably cheeky, with an undercurrent of teenage angst," compared to Tobey Maguire's "earnest" and "dorky" rendition of the character. He is portrayed as intellectually gifted, technologically proficient and street smart, able to hack into computer systems and design his own web shooters after stealing canisters of genetically-engineered spider web from Oscorp and recall a complex equation his father had worked on. He also has a snarky, sarcastic and witty sense of humor and messes around and humiliates criminals with mocking insults and deadpan one-liners, toying with a car thief on his first official night as a vigilante. When he is not goofing around with criminals and super-villains, he is determined and courageous and despite some initial hesitation and after rethinking the purpose of his vigilante alter-ego, decides to use his superpowers for legitimately altruistic purposes and to help others in need; for example, when confronted with the choice, he chooses to protect the innocent by rescuing a man's son, Jack, rather than chase down The Lizard. Unlike other versions of the character, Peter is seen skateboarding in the film, which Marc Webb says makes Peter less terrified of swinging from webs.

Webb described The Amazing Spider-Man as "a story about a kid who grows up looking for his father and finds himself." Both Webb and star Garfield described Parker as an outsider by choice, someone hard to get close to. As in the early comic books, the character "is a science whiz. If you look back to the early Stan Lee and Steve Ditko comics, he's a nerd with big glasses," said Webb. He explained "the idea of what a nerd is has changed in 40 or 50 years. Nerds are running the world. Andrew Garfield made a movie [called The Social Network] about it. ... What was important in those early comics was this notion that Peter Parker is an outsider and how we define that in a contemporary context."

Garfield compared his Spider-Man façade as a metaphor for internet anonymity, saying, "You feel the power of it, the power of not being seen, the power of the mask. Peter becomes witty when he's got that protective layer. It's like he's on a message board. He's got the anonymity of the Internet within that suit, and he can say whatever the hell he likes, and he can get away with anything." Garfield tried to explore Parker as an orphan, whom he feels "are the strongest human beings on the planet." He said Parker is "a human hero [who] goes through all of the same struggles that we all have gone through, especially the skinny ones [who] want more power than they feel they have." He believes Parker represents "a very inspiring, aspirational character that symbolizes goodness—and how difficult it is to be good—but how worth it it is." During the production of the second film, Garfield suggested that the film could explore Parker's sexuality, and proposed a romance with a gender-swapped version of Mary Jane Watson portrayed by Michael B. Jordan.

Rhys Ifans, who portrays Dr. Curt Connors/The Lizard in The Amazing Spider-Man, compared the film to William Shakespeare's Hamlet on the grounds that Spider-Man can be redone over and over in different ways. He felt that they are similar in that they both represent meaningful archetypal young men grappling with the loss of their father. Critics like Claudia Puig of USA Today felt that Garfield's character as the superhero "embodies the nerdy Parker, the anguished fatherless teen and the cocky super-hero in equal doses". Boyd Hoij of Variety noted that Garfield's character as Spider-Man makes an interesting hero in the film because of how it establishes early on that Peter's growing pains along with his search for an identity are common to any teenager and that "his struggles involve real people—and real lives."

== Fictional character biography ==
=== Origin ===
Peter Parker was born to Richard and Mary Parker in August 1995. In 2001, Richard and Mary leave him at his Uncle Ben and Aunt May's house after discovering Richard's office was ransacked. Peter was raised by Ben and May and became close friends with Harry Osborn until the latter was sent to boarding school by his abusive father, Norman Osborn.

During his senior year at Midtown Science High School in New York City, Peter develops a crush on his classmate Gwen Stacy. Though frequently bullied, Peter excels in his studies. After Gwen breaks up a fight between Peter and Flash in which Flash attacks Peter for defending another student, she begins to return his feelings.

After discovering a briefcase containing his father's work, Peter seeks out his father's co-worker, Dr. Curtis Connors. Peter searches the Internet for information about Richard and Connors' work, which leads him to discover his parents' death in a plane crash. Peter sneaks into Oscorp and is bit by a genetically modified spider, giving him spider-like abilities such as super strength, sharp senses, reflexes, agility, and speed. Peter later visits Connors at his home, revealing he is Richard's son and gives Connors his father's "decay rate algorithm," the missing piece in Connors' experiments on regenerating limbs. In school, Peter is put in detention after using his new abilities to humiliate Flash. His uncle changes work shifts to meet with the principal and asks Peter to walk Aunt May home that night. Peter forgets to do so, distracted while at Oscorp helping Connors regenerate the limb of a laboratory mouse with a new serum. At home, Ben scolds Peter for forgetting to pick up May, telling him that "With great power comes great responsibility." Irritated, Peter runs away. While searching for Peter, Ben is killed by a thief. Peter uses his new abilities to track down criminals matching the killer's description, later resolving to create a mask to hide his identity during his exploits. He adds a spandex suit and builds mechanical web-shooters to attach to his wrists to shoot a biocable "web".

=== Fighting the Lizard ===
Gwen and Peter begin dating, and at dinner with Gwen's family, Peter has a tense conversation with her father, NYPD captain George Stacy, over the new masked vigilante's motives. After dinner, Peter reveals his identity to Gwen, and they kiss before he is alerted to a situation at the Williamsburg Bridge. Peter saves numerous cars and their occupants from being tossed into the river by The Lizard, who is actually Connors after he tests the serum on himself. Peter begins calling himself "Spider-Man" afterward, becoming influenced to help others with his powers.

Peter suspects Connors is the Lizard, and later unsuccessfully confronts Connors in the sewers, leaving behind his camera. Connors learns Peter's identity via the name on the camera and pursues him to Midtown Science High School, where they fight. In response, the police start a manhunt for both Peter and Connors. Connors heads to Oscorp, intending to disperse his serum across the city and turn everyone into lizards, while Gwen develops an antidote in Oscorp's lab. The police corner Peter and Captain Stacy discover that he is Spider-Man, but he lets him escape to go save Gwen. Realizing Peter is on their side, the police and several crane operators then coordinate to help a wounded Peter reach Oscorp Tower in time. Peter manages to replace Connors' serum with the antidote, reverting Connors to human form, but not before Connors mortally wounds Captain Stacy. Before his death, Captain Stacy makes Peter promise to stay away from Gwen for her safety. He initially keeps the promise, but later admits to Gwen that failed promises are "the best kind", hinting that he will continue to see her.

=== Fighting Harry and Electro ===
In 2014, Peter apprehends mobster Aleksei Sytsevich before his high school graduation ceremony, where Gwen graduates valedictorian. Later, Gwen breaks up with him, as he is unable to fully commit to a relationship due to his guilt over disobeying Captain Stacy's last wish.

Peter visits Harry Osborn, his childhood friend, following Harry's father Norman's death. Later that night, Peter meets Gwen in an attempt to maintain a friendship, and Gwen tells Peter that she will move to England if she gets a scholarship from Oxford University. Before the two can discuss it, Max Dillon, an electrical engineer whom Peter saved earlier, accidentally shuts off the power to Times Square while looking for electricity to power himself, as he had mutated into a living electric generator after an incident with electric eels. Max is stopped by Peter and is taken to the Ravencroft Institute, where he is studied and tortured by German scientist Dr. Kafka.

Harry begins to show symptoms of his father's illness and uses the device Norman gave him to deduce that Spider-Man's blood could help save him. Peter visits Harry as Spider-Man, but refuses to give him his blood, fearing another incident like Connors'. Peter uses information left behind by his father to locate a video message Richard left. In it, Richard explains that he had to leave New York because he refused to let Norman Osborn use what they had created with his research for biological warfare and that the spiders that ultimately bit Peter were created with Richard's DNA, thereby explaining why Peter is the only successful 'cross-species' to be created.

As a vengeful Harry begins to conspire with Max, who now calls himself "Electro", Peter receives a voicemail message from Gwen, telling him that she was offered the job in England and is heading to the airport to fly there earlier than expected. Peter manages to catch her and professes his love for her, and the two agree to go to England together. They are interrupted by a blackout caused by Max. Peter heads off to fight, but Gwen arrives in a police car and hits Max, telling Peter he can't keep her away from danger and must let her make her own decisions. The two defeat and kill Max by overloading his electricity supply.

Just after they do so, Harry arrives, now as the Green Goblin, having figured out Peter's identity and wanting revenge for being refused the blood transfusion. Harry captures Gwen and drops her from the top of a clock tower. Peter catches her with a webline, but it stretches too far, and her body hits the ground below, killing her instantly. Devastated by his failure to save her, Peter ends his career as Spider-Man.

Five months pass and Spider-Man is nowhere to be seen in New York, as Peter spends every day at Gwen's grave. Later, an unknown team of men breaks Sytsevich out of prison. Equipped with an electromechanical suit of armor, Sytsevich dubs himself "the Rhino" and rampages through the streets. Peter, inspired by re-watching Gwen's graduation speech, resumes his role as Spider-Man and confronts him.

=== Multiversal crisis ===
Ten years after Gwen's death, Peter (dubbed "Peter-Three" during the film) is accidentally transported to Earth-616 due to a failed magic spell by Doctor Strange and that universe's Peter Parker (dubbed Peter-One) meant to restore the latter's secret identity after it was exposed by Mysterio. (Note: As depicted in Spider-Man: Far From Home (2019).) Unbeknownst to Peter, alternate versions of Connors and Max were also transported into this universe, alongside other villains from another universe. (Note: Connors was taken sometime prior to the climax of The Amazing Spider-Man, while Dillon was taken immediately prior to his death.) While there, Peter finds another alternate version of himself (dubbed "Peter-Two") from another alternate universe, who helps him console the Peter of Earth-616 after the death of his Aunt May at the hands of the Green Goblin of Peter-Two's world. He reveals that after Gwen died, he became bitter and "stopped pulling his punches", explaining to his younger counterpart that he doesn't want him to become like him.

Peter is happy to bond with his alternate selves as they create cures for the villains to save them from the deaths they would face in their own universes, coming to see the other Peters as brothers. The three lure the villains to the Statue of Liberty, where they are cured one by one. Peter rescues MJ, the girlfriend of Peter-One, when she falls off the scaffolding surrounding the statue, allowing him to forgive himself for Gwen's death. After defeating and curing all the villains and making amends with Max, Peter says goodbye to his alternate selves and is returned to his universe. (Note: Parker, along with Peter-Two and a universe-displaced Eddie Brock, are the only ones returned to the present time in their respective universes.)

== Comic appearances ==
=== Marvel Infinite tie-in comics ===
Taking place in between the events of both films, Peter took on an assignment from J. Jonah Jameson of The Daily Bugle to take pictures of Spider-Man and maintained a friendship with Gwen after their initial breakup, redesigning his costume with her after his first one was damaged by a turbine.

=== Mainstream continuity ===
Though he does not appear, this version of Peter Parker is mentioned in the Marvel Comics storyline "Spider-Verse", which features many iterations of the character from multiple universes. He is mentioned as resembling "the guy from The Social Network", a film that Garfield had also starred in.

== In other media ==
=== Film ===
- In alternate ending of The Amazing Spider-Man 2 (2014), shows Peter encountering his father Richard at Gwen's grave, with Richard having faked his death to keep Peter safe. Richard comforts his son on Gwen's death, having both lost someone they deeply love, and he inspires Parker to carry on while stating "with great power comes great responsibility."
- During development of the 2012 reboot, there were discussions with Marvel Studios to include the franchise canon to the MCU, as the idea was prompted to have Oscorp appear in the New York City skyline for The Avengers. However, the idea was scrapped as the skyline was already fully rendered by the time they had settled for the design of the Oscorp building.
- Prior to Sony's 2015 decision to collaborate with Marvel Studios and reboot the character of Spider-Man within the Marvel Cinematic Universe, Garfield had considered starring in a fourth main installment of the franchise before fully retiring from the role. Sony had also reportedly considered the option of doing a crossover film between Garfield's Spider-Man and the version of the character played by Tobey Maguire in Sam Raimi's Spider-Man trilogy, with Raimi himself reportedly asked to direct it. This never came to fruition, although Maguire and Garfield's iterations of the characters would eventually appear together in No Way Home.
- An unused scene involving a cameo consisting of Andrew Garfield's version of Spider-Man, alongside Tobey Maguire's and Tom Holland's versions in Spider-Man: Into the Spider-Verse was scrapped from the final version of the film.
- Garfield's Spider-Man appears through archive footage from The Amazing Spider-Man in the Into the Spider-Verse sequel Spider-Man: Across the Spider-Verse (2023).

=== Video games ===
- This version of Peter Parker/Spider-Man appears in The Amazing Spider-Man voiced by Sam Riegel. In this alternate continuation of the film, the story follows Peter in conflict with newly escaped Cross-Species and Alistair Smythe, Dr. Connors' replacement at Oscorp, all while housesitting in the city for an old friend named Stan.
- The Amazing Spider-Man 2 features the same version of the character from its predecessor, once again voiced by Sam Riegel. The game's plot is loosely based on the film and includes a variety of other characters and adversaries such as Shocker, Black Cat, Kraven the Hunter, Kingpin, and Carnage.
- The suit featured in The Amazing Spider-Man is available as an alternate costume in the game Marvel's Spider-Man (2018) developed by Insomniac Games. Featured in-game as the "Amazing Suit", it was made available for free to owners of the original PlayStation 4 version in a post-launch update on November 22, 2020, while it is immediately equipable in Spider-Man Remastered (2020) for PlayStation 5 and Microsoft Windows.
  - The "Amazing Suit" returns as an alternate costume for Peter in Marvel's Spider-Man 2, the third installment of the Marvel's Spider-Man franchise. In addition, the suit as seen in The Amazing Spider-Man 2 is also available to unlock and is also named the "Amazing 2 Suit".

== Reception ==
Despite the polarizing reception of the films themselves, several critics and fans praised Garfield's humanly flawed portrayal of Peter Parker, with Roger Ebert stating that the reboot "gave Peter better reasons to take up his superhero role, even if the origin story didn't need to be told once again." In addition, Garfield's chemistry with co-star Emma Stone was also praised. Mary F. Pols of Time magazine said that even though the story was familiar, Garfield and Webb made it feel "convincingly fresh and exciting." The Hollywood Reporter praised Garfield for his emotional performance in The Amazing Spider-Man 2, despite criticism of the film's convoluted plot.

Writing in August 2020, Eric Eisenberg of CinemaBlend considered Garfield's interpretation of Spider-Man as one of the highlights of both The Amazing Spider-Man and its sequel, and called this iteration of the character "underrated". He referred to the Marc Webb series as the "middle child" of Spider-Man movies compared to the Sam Raimi trilogy and Spider-Man's inclusion in the Marvel Cinematic Universe, and that Garfield was a "victim of circumstance". He also noted that the films displayed Peter Parker's technological prowess more in-depth than the preceding trilogy. However, he called Garfield's iteration "too cool" for Peter Parker, calling him a "rebel with a skateboard" as opposed to the nerd commonly associated with the character.

In 2017, following the character's second reboot with Tom Holland taking on the role in the MCU, Nick Philpott of CBR ranked Garfield's iteration the second greatest portrayal of the character, two spots ahead of Tobey Maguire's and just behind Holland's.

=== Accolades ===
Year	Film	Award	Category	Result	Ref(s)
2012	The Amazing Spider-Man	Teen Choice Awards	Choice Summer Movie Star: Male	Nominated	
2013	The Amazing Spider-Man	People's Choice Awards	Favorite Movie Superhero	Nominated	
2013	The Amazing Spider-Man	People's Choice Awards	Favorite On-Screen Chemistry (Note: Shared with Emma Stone.)	Nominated	
2013	The Amazing Spider-Man	Kids' Choice Awards	Favorite Movie Actor	Nominated	
2013	The Amazing Spider-Man	Kids' Choice Awards	Favorite Male Buttkicker	Nominated	
2014	The Amazing Spider-Man 2	Teen Choice Awards	Choice Movie Actor: Sci-Fi/Fantasy	Nominated	
2014	The Amazing Spider-Man 2	Teen Choice Awards	Choice Movie: Liplock	Nominated	
2015	The Amazing Spider-Man 2	Kids' Choice Awards	Favorite Male Action Star	Nominated	
2022	Spider-Man: No Way Home	Critics' Choice Super Awards	Best Actor in a Superhero Movie	Won	
2022	Spider-Man: No Way Home	MTV Movie & TV Awards	Best Team (Note: Shared with Tom Holland and Tobey Maguire.)	Nominated	

== Future ==
=== #MakeTASM3 movement and possible Venom crossover ===
Garfield's appearance in No Way Home was met with a highly positive reception from both fans and critics. Subsequently, a fan campaign using the hashtag #MakeTASM3 began on Twitter advocating for Sony to produce a third film in the Amazing Spider-Man series, with Garfield reprising his role. Both the hashtag (with 86,000 tweets) and Garfield's name (302,000 tweets) trended on Twitter during the opening weekend of No Way Home.

Some have suggested that the Amazing Spider-Man films be connected to and retconned into Sony's Spider-Man Universe, with the proposal that Garfield's Spider-Man battle Tom Hardy's Venom in a future film, based on a conversation in No Way Home in which Garfield's Peter Parker complains that Maguire and Holland's versions of Parker got to fight aliens while he has not. Garfield has stated that he would be open to reprising his role as Parker, especially alongside Holland and Maguire again. Garfield also stated on The Happy Sad Confused Podcast that he would be interested in a Venom crossover, while Tom Holland also expressed his support for a potential Amazing Spider-Man 3, saying "I would love to see [it]". Sony's official Twitter account has acknowledged the #MakeTASM3 hashtag, though the account stated that it is just a managed social platform and not actually a production company that decide which movies should be greenlit.

== See also ==
- Spider-Man in film
