= MJ (Marvel Cinematic Universe) =

Fictional character

- Marvel Cinematic Universe character
- MJ in Spider-Man: Brand New Day (2026)
- First appearance: Spider-Man: Homecoming (2017)
- Created by: Jonathan Goldstein; John Francis Daley; Jon Watts; Christopher Ford; Chris McKenna; Erik Sommers
- Based on: Mary Jane Watson by: Stan Lee; John Romita Sr.
- Portrayed by: Zendaya

In-universe information
- Full name: Michelle Jones-Watson
- Nickname: MJ
- Occupation: Undergraduate; Barista
- Significant other: Peter Parker (ex-boyfriend)
- Origin: Queens, New York, United States
- Nationality: American

Michelle Jones-Watson, most commonly known as MJ, is a fictional character portrayed by Zendaya in the Marvel Cinematic Universe (MCU) film franchise, an original character within the media franchise that pays homage to Mary Jane "MJ" Watson, main love interest of Spider-Man in comic books and various media.

She is depicted as a smart, snarky classmate of Peter Parker in Spider-Man: Homecoming (2017), and in Spider-Man: Far From Home (2019) becomes his love interest as well as correctly guessing Peter is Spider-Man. She returns in Spider-Man: No Way Home (2021), helping Peter, Ned Leeds, and Doctor Strange to capture multiple villains that have entered their universe from the multiverse, due to a failed spell to make the world forget about Mysterio revealing that Peter was Spider-Man. Her romantic involvement in Peter's personal life would eventually be undone due to Strange's casting of a spell that permanently erased the world's memory of Peter's civilian persona, including the loss of his previous bonds he forged with his friends, loved ones, and allies. MJ returns in Spider-Man: Brand New Day (2026), living a normal life after forgetting Peter. However, she is quickly caught in the middle of Peter's conflict with Jean Grey, where she discovers Spider-Man's identity and appears to regain her memories of Peter by the movie's end.

The character has received positive reviews, and Zendaya has been praised as a strong female supporting cast member, receiving the Saturn Award for Best Supporting Actress for her acting in Far From Home.

== Creation and concept ==
She has a really cool wardrobe, really funny, lots of literary nods. I like the idea that she's a real reader and bookish. She always has a big pile of books she's carrying around, which I picked and obsessed over.

— Jon Watts, director

According to Spider-Man: Homecoming co-screenwriter John Francis Daley, Michelle was intended as a reinvention of Mary Jane Watson. While her nickname reveal was an homage to the supporting character within the comic books and other Spider-Man media, Marvel Studios president Kevin Feige confirmed she is an original Marvel Cinematic Universe character. Feige added: "Peter's had a lot of friends over the years in the comics, and a lot of schoolmates and characters he's interacted with. It wasn't just Mary Jane Watson; it wasn't just Gwen Stacy; it wasn't just Harry Osborn. So we were very interested in the other characters, and that's where Liz came from and that's where the version of the character Michelle came from." Jon Watts, director of Spider-Man: Homecoming, Spider-Man: Far From Home and Spider-Man: No Way Home, likened the character to Ally Sheedy's Allison Reynolds from The Breakfast Club (1985) and Linda Cardellini's Lindsay Weir from Freaks and Geeks (1999–2000).

The character's full name is Michelle Jones-Watson, which was first revealed in Spider-Man: No Way Home. Until that point, she had been referred to once as Michelle and primarily known by the nickname MJ; although the name "Michelle Jones" had been used in an article by Variety, quickly spreading among the press and fans through citogenesis, the name was not used in any official media until No Way Home. Zendaya revealed during an interview in 2026, that there was a scene filmed for No Way Home which would have revealed why MJ dropped the "Jones" part of her name, but it was cut from the final film.

== Portrayal and characterization ==
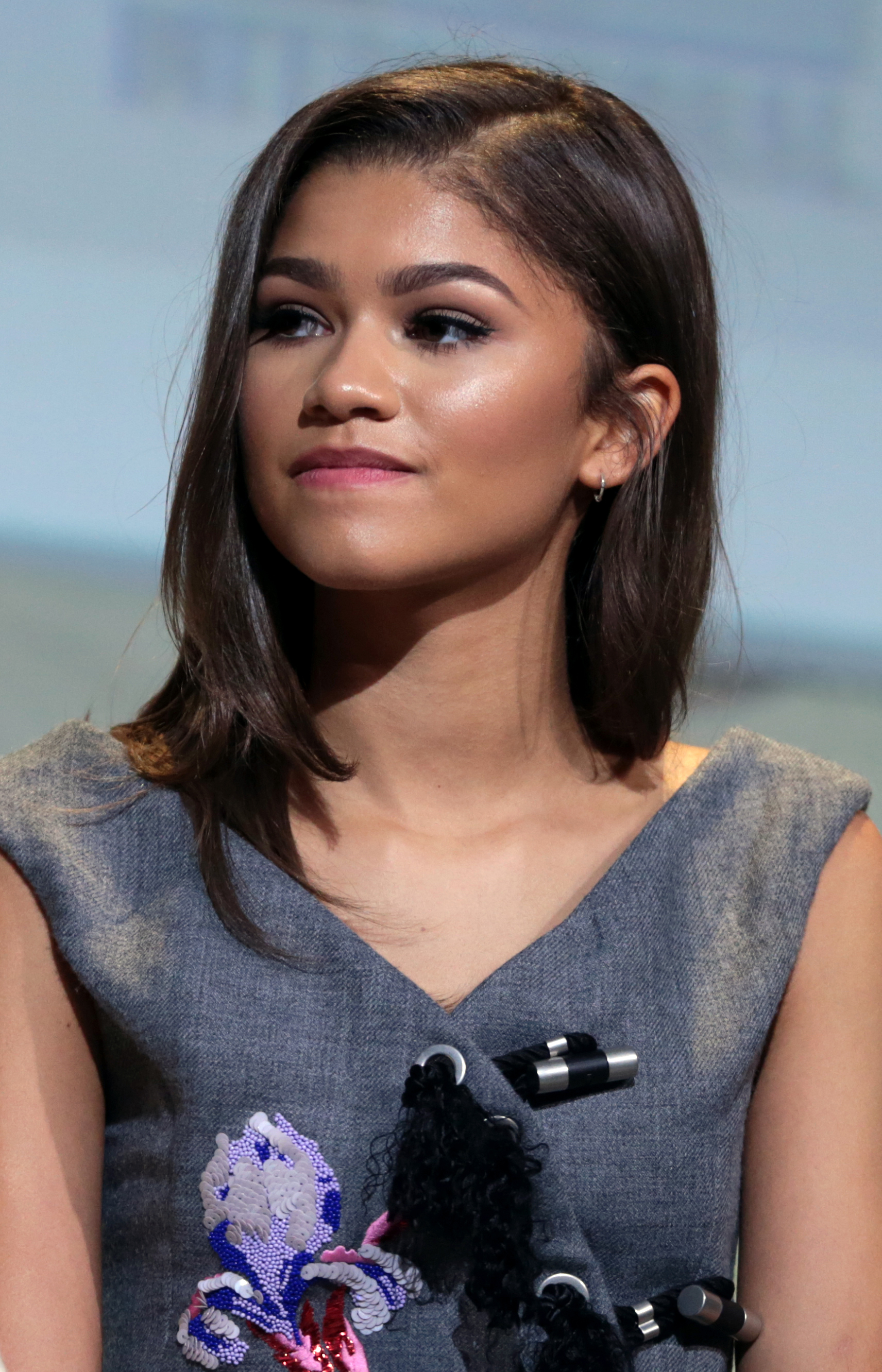
Zendaya portrays the character in the MCU.

MJ is portrayed by actress Zendaya in the Marvel Cinematic Universe as a classmate of Peter Parker at Midtown School of Science and Technology and a teammate on the academic decathlon team. She is depicted as politically active with critical views, and a loner who claims to eschew friendship. Zendaya described the character as "very dry, awkward, intellectual". This sometimes manifests itself in the form of deadpan sarcasm, as when she calls Peter and Ned "losers" for ogling his crush, Liz, from afar. Among her unusual hobbies is attending detention simply to "sketch people in crisis."

Unlike previous supporting female characters within Spider-Man films, such as Mary Jane Watson from the Sam Raimi trilogy and Gwen Stacy from the Amazing Spider-Man films, MJ is neither a romantic interest nor a damsel in distress at the beginning of her character arc. Instead, the character Liz was created initially for the role of romantic interest in a way that tied into Parker's conflict with the Vulture.

In the third film, she is rescued from a fall by Andrew Garfield's incarnation of Spider-Man, prompting an emotional moment for that Spider-Man, in light of his failure to save Gwen Stacy from a similar fate in The Amazing Spider-Man 2.

== Fictional character biography ==
=== High school life ===
In 2016, Michelle, commonly known as MJ, is introduced as a student at Midtown School of Science and Technology and enjoys mocking her classmates, including Peter Parker. She is a member of the Academic Decathlon team and attends a competition in Washington, D.C., during which they win, although she notices Peter's disappearance. At the Washington Monument, she witnesses Spider-Man's arrival. After Liz Allan leaves the school, she is offered Allan's role of Captain of the team by Roger Harrington. She begins to open up more with teammates, such as Peter and Ned Leeds, secretly considering them as her friends.

=== School vacation ===
In 2018, MJ is a victim of the Blip, (Note: During the events of Avengers: Infinity War (2018).) before being restored to life in 2023. (Note: During the events of Avengers: Endgame (2019).) In 2024, MJ attends the school-sponsored trip to Europe, where her affections are sought out by both Peter and Brad Davis. When she deduces Peter's identity as Spider-Man, MJ helps discover Mysterio's hero fraud, as he was the one who staged the Elemental invasion. In London, MJ, Ned, Betty Brant, and Flash Thompson are met by Happy Hogan and take cover from Mysterio's drones after they get targeted. After Mysterio is defeated, MJ embraces Peter. Soon after returning home, MJ and Peter begin a relationship and have their first date by swinging in the city. Afterwards, they witness TheDailyBugle.net's J. Jonah Jameson releasing a doctored video of Mysterio and Spider-Man, claiming that Spider-Man is responsible for the Battle of London (during which Mysterio was killed) and exposing his identity as Peter Parker.

=== Multiversal invasion ===
MJ is immediately surrounded by people asking her if she is Spider-Man's girlfriend, but is picked up by Peter and swung back to his apartment, where she meets Peter's aunt May. She is eventually interrogated and taken to custody by the Department of Damage Control. MJ, Peter, and Ned then become infamous, resulting in all their college applications being rejected.

MJ and Ned are found by Stephen Strange and brought to the New York Sanctum to help Peter track down individuals from alternate universes who were brought to theirs after a spell went wrong. They are instructed by Peter to keep watch over Strange's mystical box as he tries to help the individuals be cured of their villainous traits. At Ned's grandmother's house, MJ encourages Ned to use Strange's sling ring to try to locate Peter. Ned successfully opens a portal, but the two are instead met with an alternate version of Peter (later dubbed "Peter-Three"). Ned tries again, only to locate another alternate version of Peter (later dubbed "Peter-Two"). MJ and Ned go to Midtown's rooftop and comfort Peter, who had just witnessed the Green Goblin kill May. They then introduce him to his two variants, who provide advice, and join them in Midtown's laboratory.

MJ and Ned are attacked by Lizard after Ned is unable to close the portal from Midtown to the Statue of Liberty, although Peter comes to their aid. MJ and Ned escape onto the Statue and Ned opens another portal, this time leading them to Strange. MJ falls off of the statue after a pumpkin bomb from the Goblin detonates on the mystical box, destabilizing the spell once more and threatening the fabric of reality. Peter tries to save her but is whisked away by the Goblin, and Peter-Three, who lost his own girlfriend, Gwen Stacy, in a similar manner, takes notice and saves her. Peter tells MJ and Ned that Strange would recast the spell on his request to erase him from everyone's memory in order to send the multiversal visitors back home. MJ confesses her love for Parker and they kiss passionately before the spell takes effect.

Weeks later, MJ greets Ned at her shop, both having been accepted into MIT, and meets Peter, who considers reintroducing himself, but ultimately decides against it, wishing to not involve her and Ned in his life again to protect them from harm.

=== Return to New York ===
After graduating from MIT, MJ and Ned rent an apartment together in New York. During the housewarming party, MJ runs into Peter, who had followed Ned into the apartment and mingled with the crowd. He had brought flowers with him, passing them off as a welcome gift and giving them to her, pretending to be a neighbor. Peter watches her from afar until he sees her with her new boyfriend, which compels him to leave.

Some time later, Spider-Man appears at MJ's apartment, saying she is in danger urging her to come with him, to which she reluctantly obliges. On a rooftop, MJ asks Spider-Man to reveal who he is to her and kisses him, causing Peter to break down in tears, believing MJ has remembered him. However, a mysterious force has taken control of MJ's mind, using her to taunt Peter before compelling her to jump off of a rooftop, but she is saved by Peter and regains consciousness.

Peter takes MJ to Frank Castle's lair to hide out, where he explains that she had been possessed by a telepath named Jean Grey, who has been in conflict with Peter and targeted MJ due to her connection to him. MJ helps Peter develop two power inhibitors; one specifically for his mutating arachnid DNA, and a universal inhibitor for Jean. Peter departs shortly after to help the Department of Damage Control apprehend Jean, and MJ urges Castle to follow Peter and help him. While they are gone, MJ discovers the letter Peter wrote to her and Ned explaining the spell. When he returns, MJ confronts him about the letter. He explains himself and confesses his love for her, but she apologizes to him, saying that she truly has no memory of him and cannot reciprocate.

Despite this, MJ invites Peter to her apartment to spend time with her and Ned. MJ describes her experience being possessed by Jean to Peter, which makes him realize that DODC director Bill Metzger had lied to him about Jean's motives, and he takes off to rescue her after convening with Yelena Belova. Jean loses control of her abilities and psionically locks the city around her, leaving MJ and Ned frozen in place and she cries. When things return to normal, MJ views a news report stating that Spider-Man had been seriously injured, and drops off a drawing she made of him and Ned at Peter's bedside. She returns to the roof of her high school, silently contemplating whether or not she has feelings for Peter as she fidgets with the black dahlia necklace he gave her.

== Reception ==
=== Casting controversy ===
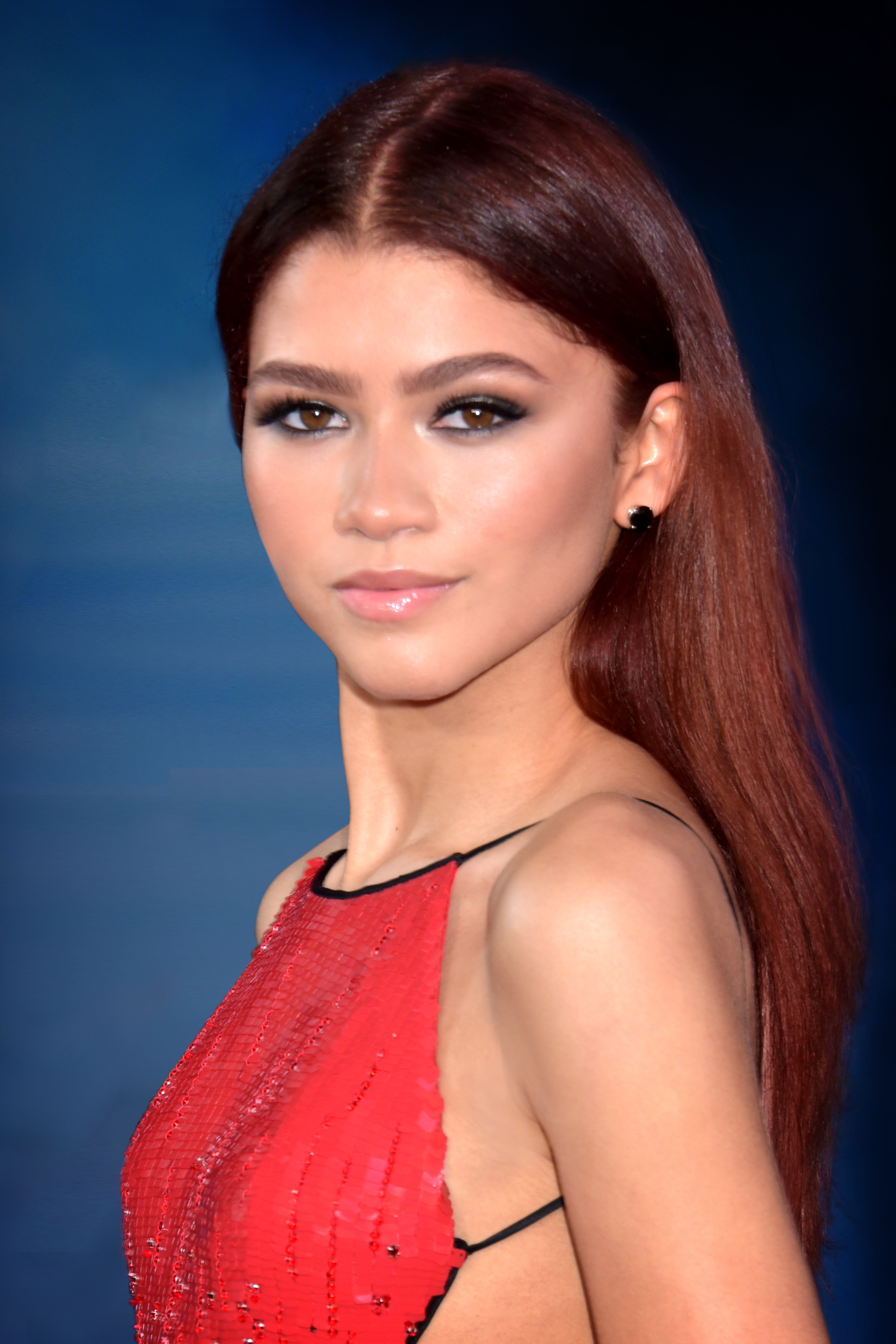
Zendaya at the Spider-Man: Far From Home premiere in 2019

After the announcement of Zendaya's casting, controversy and speculation centered upon the fact that Zendaya, an African American actress, would be portraying Mary Jane Watson. Media outlets defended Zendaya over the issue, along with the Guardians of the Galaxy film series director James Gunn and Mary Jane co-creator Stan Lee on social media. Zendaya responded to the rumors of her character as Mary Jane by The Hollywood Reporter in an interview saying:

"Whenever we were on set, one of us gets some random character name [on the call sheet]. [Bloggers were] like, "Oh they must be so and so." And we just crack up about it, because it's like, 'Whatever you want to think. You'll find out.' It's funny to watch the guessing game. But of course there's going to be outrage over that because for some reason some people just aren't ready. I'm like, "I don't know what America you live in, but from what I see when I walk outside my streets of New York right now, I see lots of diversity and I see the real world and it's beautiful, and that's what should be reflected and that's what is reflected so you're just going to have to get over it."

Zendaya also confirmed that despite the confusion, she is "100% Michelle" and not Mary Jane as many had speculated. However Michelle is revealed to be nicknamed "MJ" in Homecoming, by which she is known for the entirety of Far From Home, while her full name is revealed to be Michelle Jones-Watson in No Way Home, though she says she goes by Michelle Jones.

=== Portrayal reaction ===
The character of MJ had a positive reception in Homecoming by film critics, with Zendaya referred to as a "scene stealer" in her first major film role, despite her limited screen-time. Caitlin Busch of Inverse felt thankful that the character was not Mary Jane Watson and opined that the original character works better for the film.

The character has also received positive feedback from a feminist perspective, especially in Spider-Man: Far From Home. Karen Han of Polygon felt that the character was a positive representation of strong female characters while additionally Vanity Fair noted how MJ was not portrayed as a warrior like Hayley Atwell's Peggy Carter, Lupita Nyong'o's Nakia or Evangeline Lilly's Hope van Dyne but also not a damsel and declared her as the "MJ we both need and deserve". Her personality was reminiscent to Daria Morgendorffer in Daria to some reporters. Rachel Leishman of The Mary Sue described the MCU version of MJ as extremely important in Peter Parker's life.

MJ, alongside Parker and Jacob Batalon's Ned Leeds were described as a "priceless trio" by Pete Hammond of Deadline Hollywood with his review of Spider-Man: No Way Home. The relationship between the three characters in the films were noted as more matured by Brian Lowry of CNN. Sam Machkovech of Ars Technica also praised the trio's chemistry noting that in the second film both MJ and Ned had a rivalry with each other of Peter's relationship but in the third film they were ultimately more bonded together. The chemistry in Spider-Man: No Way Home of MJ and Tom Holland's Parker was praised by RogerEbert.com's Brian Tallerico. Brian opined that the film is the first of the films to let their relationship to shine. He also noted, "she nails the emotional final beats of her character in a way that adds weight to a film that can feel a bit airy in terms of performance." Don Kaye of Den of Geek also praised the chemistry of MJ with Parker and also noted that both she and Batalon "provide gentle comic relief". Jennifer Bisset of CNET described her role as much more to do in the third film and also noted of Zendaya's role being gifted of character growth. Eli Glasner of CBC News described "formerly mopey" MJ as having an stronger footing with Parker in the third film.

=== Accolades ===
Zendaya has received numerous nominations and awards for her portrayal of MJ.

Year	Film	Award	Category	Result	Ref(s)
2017	Spider-Man: Homecoming	Teen Choice Awards	Choice Breakout Movie Star	Nominated	
2017	Spider-Man: Homecoming	Teen Choice Awards	Choice Summer Movie Actress	Won	
2018	Spider-Man: Homecoming	Kids' Choice Awards	Favorite Movie Actress	Won	
2018	Spider-Man: Homecoming	Saturn Awards	Best Performance by a Younger Actor in a Film	Nominated	
2019	Spider-Man: Far From Home	Teen Choice Awards	Choice Summer Movie Actress	Won	
2019	Spider-Man: Far From Home	Saturn Awards	Best Supporting Actress	Won	
2019	Spider-Man: Far From Home	People's Choice Awards	Female Movie Star of 2019	Won	
2020	Spider-Man: Far From Home	Kids' Choice Awards	Favorite Movie Actress	Nominated	
2022	Spider-Man: No Way Home	Critics' Choice Super Awards	Best Actress in a Superhero Movie	Nominated	
2022	Spider-Man: No Way Home	Kids' Choice Awards	Favorite Movie Actress	Won	
2022	Spider-Man: No Way Home	MTV Movie & TV Awards	Best Kiss (Note: Shared with Tom Holland.)	Nominated	
2022	Spider-Man: No Way Home	BET Awards	Best Actress	Won	
2022	Spider-Man: No Way Home	Saturn Awards	Best Actress in a Film	Nominated	
2026	Spider-Man: Brand New Day	Kids' Choice Awards	Favorite Movie Actress	Pending	

== In other media ==
A cosmetic outfit based on MJ was added to Fortnite Battle Royale in December 2021 to coincide with the release of Spider-Man: No Way Home, along with an outfit based on Tom Holland's portrayal of Spider-Man.

== See also ==
- Characters of the Marvel Cinematic Universe
