= Gwen Stacy (The Amazing Spider-Man film series) =

Fictional character in the 2012–2014 series

- Marc Webb's The Amazing Spider-Man and Marvel Cinematic Universe character
- Promotional picture of Emma Stone as Gwen Stacy in The Amazing Spider-Man 2
- First appearance: The Amazing Spider-Man (2012)
- Last appearance: The Amazing Spider-Man 2 (2014)
- Based on: Gwen Stacy by; Stan Lee; Steve Ditko; Ultimate Gwen Stacy by; Brian Michael Bendis; Mark Bagley
- Adapted by: Marc Webb; James Vanderbilt
- Portrayed by: Emma Stone
- Voiced by: Kari Wahlgren

In-universe information
- Full name: Gwendolyne Maxine Stacy
- Nickname: Gwen
- Species: Human
- Gender: Female
- Occupation: High school student; Head research officer at Oscorp
- Significant other: Peter Parker
- Relatives: George Stacy (father); Helen Stacy (mother); Philip Stacy (brother); Howard Stacy (brother); Simon Stacy (brother)
- Nationality: American

Gwendolyne Maxine "Gwen" Stacy is a fictional character in Marc Webb's Amazing Spider-Man films, based on the Marvel Comics character of the same name created by Stan Lee and Steve Ditko. She was portrayed by Emma Stone in the films The Amazing Spider-Man and The Amazing Spider-Man 2. Unlike her supporting role in the previous film trilogy, Gwen prominently appears in Webb's films as one of Peter Parker's classmates, serving as his primary love interest and a foil to his character. Webb based Gwen's character on her traditional comic-book portrayal. For her performance in the films, Stone has received critical praise and wider recognition, despite the divided response to the film series as a whole.

== Character development and execution ==
=== Origins and casting ===
The character of Gwen Stacy first appeared in The Amazing Spider-Man #31 in 1965. Intended to be Spider-Man's primary love interest, she was soon superseded in popularity by Mary Jane Watson in that role by fans. This eventually led to the now-controversial decision by Spider-Man writers to kill off Gwen, which served as one of the most pivotal moments in comic-book history; Spider-Man's failure to save Gwen was one of the first big failures by a superhero, and is regarded as the end of the Silver Age of Comic Books. The character has subsequently been cloned or revived several times or seen different iterations in the comics, including one as Spider-Gwen, and has been included in several television shows and cartoons based on Spider-Man.

The first big-budget cinematic appearance of Gwen Stacy was in Spider-Man 3, with Bryce Dallas Howard portraying the character in a supporting role, as Mary Jane was already serving as Peter's main love interest in that trilogy. Following the cancellation of Spider-Man 4 and reboot of the Spider-Man film series, it was originally reported that both Gwen and Mary Jane would appear in the first film of the new series before Gwen was confirmed as the only one of Peter's love interests to appear. The shortlist of actresses to play the role included Lily Collins, Ophelia Lovibond, and Imogen Poots, with Teresa Palmer, Emma Roberts, and Mary Elizabeth Winstead, as reported by The Hollywood Reporter as "potentially in the mix". In September 2010, Variety reported that the shortlist had expanded to include Emma Stone and Mia Wasikowska. After a few more actresses were considered, Stone was announced as the winner of the role in October 2010 due to her chemistry with Spider-Man actor Andrew Garfield. That chemistry later developed into their off-screen romance.

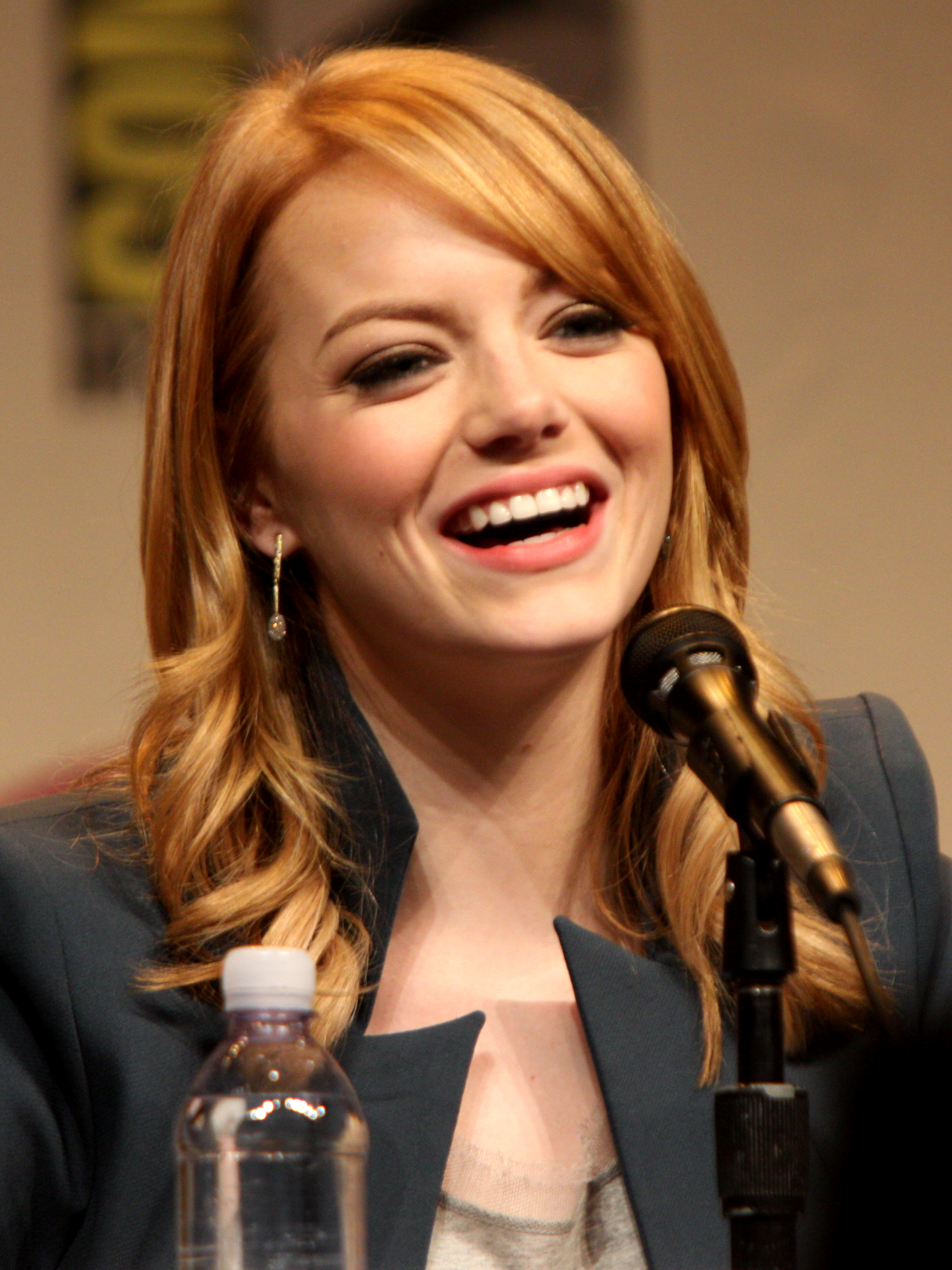
Emma Stone portrayed Gwen Stacy in The Amazing Spider-Man and its sequel.

For the role, Stone kept her natural blonde hair color to match Gwen's depiction in the comic books, rather than maintaining her usual dyed red hair. She felt that she had a responsibility to educate herself on Spider-Man, admitting she "hadn't read the comic book growing up, and my experience was with the Sam Raimi movies... I always assumed that Mary Jane was his first love", and having only been familiar with Howard's portrayal in Spider-Man 3. Stone said, "There's a part of me that really wants to please people [who] love Spider-Man or Gwen Stacy and want her to be done justice. I hope they'll give me license to interpret her my way." While The Amazing Spider-Man director Marc Webb introduced a few elements from Ultimate Spider-Man, he wanted to keep the mainstream version of Gwen Stacy instead of that world's punk rocker, though he states that the "texture" of the romantic relationship between her and Peter is based on that of the Ultimate versions of Peter and Mary Jane.

Despite her character's death in The Amazing Spider-Man 2, Stone expressed interest in returning as a resurrected Stacy in a future The Amazing Spider-Man film in an interview with Screen Rant. By July 2014, development of follow-ups Sinister Six, The Amazing Spider-Man 3, and The Amazing Spider-Man 4 had stalled; the films would have seen Stone reprise her role, the plot following a returned Norman Osborn setting a resurrected amnesiac Gwen as Carnage against Peter, Harry Osborn, and the Sinister Six. By early 2015, a deal to reboot the series within the Marvel Cinematic Universe (MCU) was reached, effectively cancelling the Amazing Spider-Man franchise.

Screenwriters Erik Sommers and Chris McKenna wrote at various points versions of the story for the MCU film Spider-Man: No Way Home that included Gwen Stacy, alongside appearances of Sally Field's Aunt May and Kirsten Dunst's Mary Jane Watson, but Sommers and McKenna ultimately concluded that the story felt already overstuffed, ultimately choosing Zendaya's Michelle "MJ" Jones and Marisa Tomei's Aunt May to be the only female characters in the film with significant screen time.

=== Characterization and themes ===
Sony Pictures' official website for The Amazing Spider-Man described Gwen Stacy as "smart, charismatic and rebellious". Stone described her character as "a daddy's girl" who is very responsible and protective of her family and loves science. She said of her character, "she offers Parker a world of stability, of a family unit not marred with parental loss and, beyond physical allure, the two forge an intellectual connection over their shared love of science." Her character, she explained, "is stuck between [her father] the Captain and Peter Parker and Spider-Man, who have different ways about going about finding justice in their lives" which she felt was a fun thing to explore. Dana Stevens of Slate described the character "as the stuff of a comic nerd's dreams: a sweet, smart, wisecracking dame in demure sweaters, miniskirts, thigh-high stockings and boots."

Gwen and Peter's relationship is further explored in The Amazing Spider-Man 2. When asked about their relationship in the sequel, Stone said, "She saves him more than he saves her. She's incredibly helpful to Spider-Man... He's the muscle, she's the brains." Emily Kubincanek of Film School Rejects observes that unlike Mary Jane Watson, the primary love interest in the Raimi trilogy, Gwen Stacy, as portrayed in the Marc Webb films, provides a "feeling of partnership" in her relationship with Peter Parker and is more than willing to aid him in his battles, even at the cost of her own life when she voluntarily helps him against Electro and is subsequently targeted and killed by the Green Goblin.

== Film appearances ==
=== The Amazing Spider-Man (2012) ===
Gwen first appears as the daughter of NYPD captain George Stacy and as a classmate to Peter Parker and Flash Thompson at Midtown Science High School. She breaks up a fight between the two, admonishing Flash for not finishing his homework and for beating up Peter, then later commends the latter for standing up to Flash. Peter and Gwen begin to develop a mutual interest in each other from that point onwards. They encounter each other later at Oscorp, where Gwen is interning as a research assistant, as Peter sneaks into the facility to find Dr. Curt Connors and is later bitten by a radioactive spider that gives him new abilities. Gwen catches up with Peter after his Uncle Ben picks him up following after-school detention, and later consoles Peter after Ben's death.

After Peter starts tracking down Ben's killer as the masked vigilante Spider-Mann, Gwen invites him to dinner with her family, where Peter and Captain Stacy argue about Spider-Man's motives. Afterwards, Peter reveals to her that he is, in fact, Spider-Man, sharing a kiss with her. Gwen also plays a crucial part in the Lizard's defeat; having helped Peter develop an antidote for Connors' serum for turning people into reptilian hybrids using her own scientific knowledge. Unfortunately, her father is killed by the Lizard before Peter can defeat the villain. George makes Peter promise to keep Gwen out of his dangerous life. Peter honors that vow and avoids Gwen, which offends her until she realizes what her father did.

=== The Amazing Spider-Man 2 (2014) ===
Gwen graduates high school as valedictorian. She ends her relationship with Peter after she sees that he is uncommitted due to his guilt about not honoring her father's wishes. She later meets up with Peter again, trying to maintain their friendship. She tells Peter that she is applying for a scholarship to Oxford University, meaning she has to move to England if she succeeds.

At Oscorp, Gwen meets Max Dillon, where she finds out that he is obsessed with Spider-Man. Later on, Max, having suffered an industrial accident and become Electro, shuts off the power to Times Square while looking for electricity to power himself. Gwen recognizes Max and realizes that Oscorp is covering up the potential scandal; Donald Menken, a high ranking and mutinous Oscorp board member, decides that she is a threat, fires her and targets her for elimination.

Gwen gets the scholarship to Oxford. Before she leaves, Peter catches up to her and declares his love for her, agreeing to accompany her to England. They are interrupted by an intentional blackout caused by Electro which endangers the entire city. Despite Peter's best efforts to keep Gwen out of harm's way, she follows him and helps him defeat Electro by overloading him with electricity. Just after they do so, Harry Osborn arrives, now the Green Goblin, having figured out Spider-Man's identity and wanting revenge for being refused a potentially life-saving blood transfusion. He kidnaps Gwen and drops her from the top of a clock tower. Peter catches her with a webline but it stretches too far, and Gwen hits the ground, dying instantly. Peter subsequently ends his career as Spider-Man out of guilt and heartbreak. However, months later, he rewatches Gwen's graduation speech, which motivates him to swing back into action. (Note: After Peter is temporarily transported to an alternate reality in Spider-Man: No Way Home, he reveals that Gwen's death still haunts him and that he became more brutal while fighting crime. Later on, Peter achieves his redemption when he manages to catch the other Peter's girlfriend MJ as she is falling, preventing her from meeting the same fate as Gwen. He returns to his universe as a happier and more optimistic man.)

== In other media ==
=== Video games ===
- This version of the character also appears in The Amazing Spider-Man tie-in game, voiced by Kari Wahlgren. Several months after the film, Gwen continues to work at Oscorp, and occasionally provides assistance to Spider-Man.
- Gwen Stacy does not appear in The Amazing Spider-Man 2 tie-in game, but is mentioned by Peter Parker while speaking to his Aunt May when he excuses himself to leave the house and pretend to check up on Gwen during an attack on Oscorp (when in reality, she was not present at the incident). Beenox confirmed that the character was excluded from the plot so the game would not spoil the then-upcoming film.

=== Miscellaneous ===
- Paige Embry, a character based on the Emma Stone portrayal of Gwen Stacy, appears in the novel The Refrigerator Monologues (2017) as the unofficial leader of the Hell Hath Club, a group of women in the afterlife trying to cope with the brutal termination of their plot lines, and provides connecting narration for each of their stories. Embry was the girlfriend of Tom Thatcher/Kid Mercury and was unceremoniously killed during a fight between him and Dr. Noucture (in a manner referencing the aspiration of her death in The Amazing Spider-Man 2). The novel's author Catherynne Valente said of how her anger at the depiction of Gwen's death in the film inspiring the novel's plot:

[I]t blindsided me in a way that Gwen Stacy taking her dive should never blindside anyone born after 1970, and it was a sucker punch, because more or less the last thing Emma Stone [as Gwen Stacy] does before she quite literally flounces off to meet her doom is snit, "Nobody makes my decisions for me, nobody! This is my choice. Mine." … [S]omeone chose to give her those words. … To make those powerful words the punchline to a sad joke about female agency by punishing her for them, by making sure that no matter how modern and independent the new Gwen might seem, everything is just as it has always been. That old, familiar message slides into our brains with the warm familiarity of a father’s hug: when women make their own choices, disaster results.

- "The Night Gwen Stacy Died" was reenacted in the horror film Happy Death Day 2U (2019), with one of Tree Gelbman's deaths modeled after Gwen's, as depicted in The Amazing Spider-Man 2.

== Reception ==
Emma Stone's performance as Gwen Stacy has received positive reviews and led to wider recognition for the actress, as she was nominated for several awards, winning "Favorite Movie Actress" at the 2015 Kids' Choice Awards. Critics praised Stone's chemistry with Andrew Garfield in both The Amazing Spider-Man and The Amazing Spider-Man 2, and the fact that her character was significantly more fleshed-out than the Gwen Stacy of 2007’s Spider-Man 3 (who had been portrayed by Bryce Dallas Howard). In a review of the first film, Stephanie Zacharek of Movieline wrote that she "had no specific desire to see the series resuscitated. But watching Garfield and Stone made me think doing so wasn't such a bad idea". Following the release of The Amazing Spider-Man 2, Alison Willmore of BuzzFeed cited Stone's performance and the love story of two people "hopelessly smitten with each other" as the highlights of the film, with the other subplots and villains serving to "complicate the relationship between Peter and Gwen." She also called the love story "uncommonly appealing" for an otherwise cliché superhero film.
