= The Amazing Spider-Man (2012 video game) =

2012 superhero video game

- Developers: Beenox; Other Ocean Interactive (DS); Gameloft (Windows Phone/Android/iOS)
- Publisher: Activision
- Writers: Seamus Kevin Fahey; John Zurhellen
- Composers: Gerard Marino; Maxime Goulet (Gameloft composer); Inon Zur (additional music)
- Series: Spider-Man
- Platform: List: Windows PlayStation 3 Wii Wii U Xbox 360 Nintendo 3DS Nintendo DS PlayStation Vita Android iOS Windows Phone Mobile phone
- Release: June 26, 2012: Nintendo 3DS, Nintendo DS, PlayStation 3, Wii & Xbox 360; NA: June 26, 2012; AU: June 27, 2012; EU: June 29, 2012 Android & iOS; WW: June 28, 2012 Windows; WW: August 10, 2012 Mobile; NA: 2012 Wii U; NA: March 5, 2013; EU: March 8, 2013 Windows Phone; NA: March 6, 2013 PlayStation Vita; NA: November 19, 2013; PAL: November 22, 2013
- Genre: Action-adventure
- Mode: Single-player

The Amazing Spider-Man is a 2012 action-adventure game developed by Beenox and published by Activision, based on the Marvel Comics character Spider-Man and the 2012 film of the same name. It was released on June 26 in North America and on June 29, 2012 in Europe for the Nintendo DS, PlayStation 3, Xbox 360, Wii, Nintendo 3DS, Android, iOS, and Microsoft Windows. A version for the Wii U was released in March 2013 in North America and Europe known as The Amazing Spider-Man: Ultimate Edition in both regions. A PlayStation Vita version was released in November 2013.

The game was directed by Gerard Lehiany and written by Seamus Kevin Fahey, Benjamin Schirtz and Gérard Lehiany. Its story serves as an alternate epilogue to The Amazing Spider-Man film, which is continued in the game's sequel. Months after the events of the film, a number of cross-species experiments created by Oscorp using Curt Connors' research escape into Manhattan and infect its population with a deadly virus, forcing Spider-Man to ally with Gwen Stacy and Connors to find a cure. Meanwhile, the new Oscorp CEO, Alistair Smythe, attempts to develop his own cure so that he will be credited as the city's savior, and to eliminate Spider-Man and Connors for interfering with his plans.

The Nintendo 3DS and Wii versions of the game include the script and plot of the other versions of the game, but feature a much different, more linear gameplay that does not have an open world environment, and instead features the player selecting a level from the map in Spider-Man's apartment, before playing a mostly linear level. It was natively designed for the 3DS and later ported to the Wii. Upon its release, the game received mixed to positive reviews from critics, with praise to the gameplay, controls, combat, dark tone, intensity and soundtrack, although it received criticism for its mode of difficulty, story, visuals, repetitive side missions and lack of innovation. A sequel, The Amazing Spider-Man 2, was released in April 2014, itself based on the 2014 film of the same name.

== Gameplay ==
=== PlayStation 3, PlayStation Vita, Wii U, Xbox 360 and Microsoft Windows ===
The Amazing Spider-Man is a third-person video game, set in an open world based on Manhattan. Players take on the role of Spider-Man and complete missions—linear scenarios with set objectives—to progress through the story. The missions are structured in a linear manner, but the player is free to explore the game's map in between missions and engage in various side activities. Players have access to all of Spider-Man's superhuman abilities, including web swinging and wall crawling. The game introduces a bullet time mechanic called Web Rush, where players slow down time by holding a button and can select between different locations that Spider-Man will automatically move towards once the player releases the button. This gameplay mechanic can be used to target enemies, whom Spider-Man will attack automatically, or objects that Spider-Man will throw at enemies, incapacitating them for a few seconds and allowing Spider-Man to web them in order to subdue them for good. The combat system is reminiscent of the Rocksteady Studios' Batman: Arkham series (at the time consisting of Batman: Arkham Asylum and Batman: Arkham City), using a freeflow design and counterattacks. Beenox took a cue from the Batman games, with Dee Brown, the head of Beenox, stating "I played both Batman games and liked them. For me, the Spider-Man character is very different than Batman. You have to approach both in a different way. I think the Rocksteady guys did a good job at providing what was required to make a great Batman game, and we're doing everything we need to this time to make a great Spider-Man game".

The game's side missions include stopping petty crimes, car chases, and gun fights in the streets, recovering missing patients from a psychiatric hospital that escaped early on in the main storyline, and transporting civilians infected by the cross-species virus to quarantine camps. Spider-Man can use his phone to take photographs of evidence that links Oscorp to the cross-species conspiracy, or collect items such as audio files related to the conspiracy. Finding this evidence rewards the player with XP Points, or extra content in the main menu, such as concept art. Players can collect full, vintage comic books, such as Amazing Fantasy #15, as they collect comic covers throughout the game's map.

The game uses a unique damage system: the more damage Spider-Man takes, the more his suit is damaged; returning to the "safe house" repairs the suit. The player can remove a utility belt from the default suit, which holds some extra web fluid. There are ten alternate suits in total, and five of them can be unlocked after completing certain tasks, or taking pictures of secret spider graffiti hidden within the city, such as the Scarlet Spider suit, the Black Suit from the 2007 film Spider-Man 3, a color-inverted version of the Future Foundation suit, the Negative Zone suit, and the Big Time suit. Two more secret suits include the Cross-Species suit (unlocked after completing the main storyline), and a Black Suit version of the 2012 film suit (unlocked after attaining 100% completion), both of which are exclusive to the game. A party hat for "Spidey's 50th anniversary" becomes available if the player changes the date of their console or PC to August 10, 2012.

The game's downloadable content adds new mini-games and suits. For example, the Rhino Challenge downloadable content (DLC) pack adds the classic Spider-Man suit from the Sam Raimi film series and a mini-game where the player controls Rhino as he rampages through the streets of Manhattan, and the Lizard Rampage DLC pack adds the Vigilante suit from the film and a mini-game where the player controls the Lizard as he fights Oscorp mercenaries and destroys beacons across the city.

=== Nintendo 3DS and Wii ===
While the Nintendo 3DS and the Wii versions share the same plot, voice-overs, general gameplay, and some of the level design from the flagship versions, they are severely stripped down. Most notably, instead of featuring an open world environment, the player selects a level from a map screen and talks to Dr. Connors. Once a level is selected, Spider-Man is dropped off at the start of the level. The game includes sub-missions that help the player gain XP.

Due to the lack of free roam within these versions of the game, players cannot find comic book pages or take pictures of hidden spider graffiti to unlock more suits. The photo mode makes use of the 3DS gyroscope, but can also be more easily controlled by the analog slider.

The 3DS version has an exclusive game mode named "Vigilante", which is a strategy-based role-playing text game where they are given a map of locations and must complete tasks and missions and collect items needed for certain missions. A meter is shown with a slide moving to either a red or green marker. When Spider-Man successfully completes the mission, the player is awarded with Vigilante Points (VP) and Action Points (AP). The higher skill rank is, more locations and additional content are unlocked. Vigilante is compatible with Street Pass, allowing the player to trade items with other players.

There are only two suits to unlock, aside from the Default Suit: the Classic Suit is unlocked by completing all the side missions, and the Black Suit is unlocked by completing the Vigilante Mode.

=== Android, iOS and Windows Phone ===
The smartphone versions follow almost the same formula, but with a different gameplay, level design, plot, and voice-overs. Players can explore Manhattan, while having some crimes to deal with. The story is linear, but the player can explore the city before entering the missions. There is also a leveling system, where you can unlock new skills for Spider-Man using the game's currency, and also unlockable costumes that you could buy in the game's shop, where it would also sell other items alongside them.

== Plot ==
Months after the events of the film, Peter Parker and Gwen Stacy sneak into the restricted areas of Oscorp after hours to investigate rumors of the company continuing Curt Connors' cross-species experiments. They are caught by new Oscorp director Alistair Smythe, who confirms the rumors and gives them a tour of Oscorp's restricted areas to see the experiments for themselves. However, the cross-species react to Peter, a cross-species himself, and break out, infecting numerous scientists, including Smythe and Gwen, with a deadly virus they are carrying. Donning his Spider-Man suit, Peter gets the infected to quarantine, but fails to stop the cross-species from escaping into the city.

After a fight with S-01, a massive cross-species hunting robot created by Oscorp, Spider-Man breaks Connors out of the mental institute where he was imprisoned to help find a cure for the virus. Spider-Man and Connors set up a laboratory at the apartment of Aunt May's friend Stan, and begin development of an antidote while keeping in close contact with Gwen and Smythe via webcam, unaware that Smythe is developing his own "cure" using nanobots that destroy the infected cells. After defeating Rhino, one of the escaped cross-species, Spider-Man retrieves Connors' research from a secret Oscorp lab before it gets destroyed. While there, he meets Whitney Chang, an undercover investigative reporter, who enlists Spider-Man's help in unveiling Oscorp's suspicious activities. Spider-Man also collects a blood sample from the rat cross-species, Vermin, for Connors' antidote, before battling a group of Hunters, another type of Oscorp cross-species hunting robots.

Spider-Man eventually delivers Connors' antidote to Gwen at Oscorp, now under complete quarantine. However, a skeptical Smythe takes and tests it on himself, claiming that, if it works, Oscorp will replicate it and he will take all the credit as the city's savior. However, instead of curing him, the antidote causes Smythe to lose the use of his legs and sanity. Enraged, he commands his robots to eliminate Spider-Man, who escapes after destroying S-02, a massive serpent-like robot. Realizing that Spider-Man is a unique cross-species who retains his humanity, Connors creates a new antidote using his DNA, which Spider-Man again delivers to Oscorp, fighting his way past security and the Scorpion cross-species. The antidote works, saving Gwen and the other infected scientists.

As the CDC quarantines the city due to the advancement of the virus and Connors begins work on replicating the antidote, Spider-Man returns to his heroic activities, foiling a bank robbery orchestrated by Felicia Hardy. Meanwhile, Smythe, having been fired from Oscorp for his actions, discovers Spider-Man's secret identity and kidnaps Connors from their apartment, challenging Spider-Man to come and rescue him at Oscorp's robotics facility. While he rescues Connors, Spider-Man is captured by Smythe, who injects him with a nanobot serum that strips away his powers, and reveals his plan to spread the same serum across the city using his greatest invention yet, S-03, unaware that the nanobots are slowly killing the host. Spider-Man escapes and makes his way across a Manhattan consumed by chaos to reach Connors' secret lab, where he reunites with him and Gwen.

While Connors transforms into the Lizard and leaves to try and stop Smythe, hoping that he can control himself long enough to stop Smythe and then return to take the antidote before he loses his mind again, Gwen resuscitates the dying Spider-Man with an AED. Realizing that electricity can destroy the nanobots, Spider-Man leaves to assist Connors and boards S-03 with Whitney Chang's help, where he electrocutes himself to destroy the nanobots and regains his powers. Spider-Man and Connors defeat Smythe, but Connors ultimately succumbs to the Lizard’s consciousness and flees into the sewers. Leaving a remorseful Smythe, who regained his sanity, for the police, Spider-Man pursues the Lizard. Along the way, he encounters and defeats Natie, the piranha cross-species, and saves Gwen, who has reprogrammed a Hunter to administer Connors' antidote across the city. Eventually, Spider-Man defeats and cures the Lizard, after which Connors willingly returns to prison. As the city returns to normal, both Spider-Man and the Lizard are credited as its saviors. Peter and Gwen learn from the news that Smythe has escaped custody but decide to deal with it later.

In a post-credits scene, Smythe, having regained the use of his legs due to being in the final stages of his infection, returns to his lab and commands one of his Hunters to kill him, choosing to die rather than become a cross-species or take Connors' cure, which he believes will not be a permanent solution.

== Development and marketing ==
A video game based on The Amazing Spider-Man was first announced at the 2011 New York Comic Con. The game was developed by Beenox, the development team behind the previous two Spider-Man games, Spider-Man: Shattered Dimensions and Spider-Man: Edge of Time. During New York Comic Con a producer at Activision, Doug Heder stated that the game would take place after the events of the film. Heder noticed the mixed reviews with their previous game Edge of Time, promising that the video game will find a different fate, due to its lengthy development time. The game had been reported to be in development by Gerard Lehiany, the creative director of Beenox. Dee Brown of Beenox felt that the film was an inspiration of the development of the video game on how the creators wanted it to turn out: "The fact that our game is based on the movie, and the movie is re-approaching the universe in a completely different way — a more grounded, more realistic approach — gives us an incredible setting to play with".

The game released on June 26, 2012. The first concept artwork of the game was released on November 10, 2011. A world premiere trailer debuted during the 2011 Spike Video Game Awards, on December 10. The game was originally developed for the Xbox 360, PlayStation 3, Wii, Nintendo DS, and Nintendo 3DS. It was later announced that game would be released for PC, which was released on August 10, 2012. The game features PlayStation Move support. The game featured pre-order bonuses.

=== Downloadable content ===
Four DLC packs were released for the PlayStation 3 and Xbox 360 versions. The Rhino Challenge pack was a GameStop exclusive pre-order, and has players control the Rhino and attacking vehicles and thugs throughout the city, and features the 2002-07 suit from the Sam Raimi films as a bonus suit. The Lizard Rampage pack has players control the Lizard and attacking guards while destroying generators, and features the Vigilante suit from The Amazing Spider-Man film as a bonus suit. The Oscorp Search and Destroy pack has two minigames with similar gameplay to the Snake and Space Invaders. The Stan Lee Adventure pack was an Amazon.com pre-order exclusive, where the player can free roam as Stan Lee (with Spider-Man's powers) around the city, and can also play a special minigame where Stan has to find pages to a script that's dedicated to Spider-Man's 50th anniversary, at the time.

=== Wii U Ultimate Edition ===
The Wii U version, titled The Amazing Spider-Man: Ultimate Edition, was released March 5 in North America and March 8, 2013, in Europe. It is a port of the PlayStation 3, Xbox 360 and the PC versions, and features all downloadable content installed onto the disc. The game also gives the player the option to use the Osphone on the Wii U Gamepad.

=== PlayStation Vita Port ===
A PlayStation Vita version of the game was confirmed on the PlayStation Blog on October 11 and released on November 19, 2013.

== Reception ==
Reception

Aggregate score
Aggregator	Score
Metacritic	3DS: 55/100 iOS: 66/100; PS3: 71/100; VITA: 55/100; WII: 58/100; WIIU: 66/100; X360: 69/100

Review scores
Publication	Score
1Up.com	(PS3) C−
Destructoid	(X360) 7/10
Eurogamer	(PC/PS3/X360) 6/10
Game Informer	(PS3) 6.75/10
GameSpot	(X360) 7.5/10
GamesRadar+	(WII U) 3/5
IGN	(3DS) 7/10 (PC/PS3/X360) 7/10 (VITA) 4.8/10
Nintendo Life	(3DS) 5/10 (WII U) 6/10
Nintendo World Report	(3DS) 4/10 (WII) 6.5/10
Push Square	(VITA) 5/10
The Guardian	(PS3) 4/5
TouchArcade	(iOS) 2/5

The Amazing Spider-Man received mixed to positive reviews with the PS3 version being the best received game. Aggregating review website Metacritic gave the PlayStation 3 version 71/100, the Xbox 360 version 69/100, the Wii U version 66/100, the Wii version 58/100, and the 3DS version 55/100.

GameSpot gave it a 7.5/10, praising its controls while criticizing its easiness. Game Informer had a more critical view of the game, scoring it 6.75/10, citing failure to live up to potential due to its generic story and repetitive side missions. IGN gave the game a 7.0/10 with Greg Miller saying "the visuals aren't stunning, the story isn't crazy exciting but The Amazing Spider-Man is fun to play". Australian video game talk show Good Game were positive with the game with Hex giving a 7 and Bajo an 8 saying, "I was just so happy to have an open world Spider-Man game again, and it's just so much fun swinging around." 1Up.com gave the game a C− and criticized the subpar open world that made the in-game New York City feel like a "post-apocalyptic nightmare-scape."

== Sequel ==
A narrative sequel taking place in the same universe as in the video game and it based on the film's sequel, was released on April 29, 2014, for Microsoft Windows, Nintendo 3DS, PlayStation 3, PlayStation 4, Wii U, Xbox 360, Xbox One, iOS and Android.
