= Green Goblin in other media =

Appearances of Green Goblin in cinema, television and video games

Adaptations of Green Goblin in other media
- Original source: Comics published by Marvel Comics
- First appearance: The Amazing Spider-Man #14 (July 1964)

Films and television
- Film(s): Spider-Man (2002); Spider-Man 2 (2004); Spider-Man 3 (2007); The Amazing Spider-Man 2 (2014); Spider-Man: Into the Spider-Verse (2018); Spider-Man: No Way Home (2021)
- Television show(s): Spider-Man (1967); Spider-Man and His Amazing Friends (1981); Spider-Man: The Animated Series (1994); Spider-Man Unlimited (1999); The Spectacular Spider-Man (2008); Ultimate Spider-Man (2012); Marvel Disk Wars: The Avengers (2014); Marvel's Spider-Man (2017); Marvel Future Avengers (2017)

The Green Goblin, a supervillain in Marvel Comics and an archenemy of the superhero Spider-Man, has been adapted in various forms of media, including films, television series, and video games. As in the comics, the Green Goblin is an alias that has been adopted by multiple characters in Spider-Man related media, most notably Norman Osborn and his son Harry Osborn.

Norman Osborn has been portrayed by Willem Dafoe in Sam Raimi's Spider-Man film trilogy and the Marvel Cinematic Universe film Spider-Man: No Way Home (2021), and Chris Cooper in The Amazing Spider-Man 2 (2014). Neil Ross, Alan Rachins, Steve Blum, Mark Rolston, and others have provided the character's voice in animated and video game projects.

Harry Osborn has been portrayed by James Franco in Raimi's Spider-Man trilogy and Dane DeHaan in The Amazing Spider-Man 2, and has been voiced by Gary Imhoff, James Arnold Taylor, and others.

== Television ==
Norman Osborn as the Green Goblin in Spider-Man (left), Spider-Man: The Animated Series (center), and The Spectacular Spider-Man (right)
- The Norman Osborn incarnation of the Green Goblin appears in Spider-Man (1967), voiced by Len Carlson. This version is a thief who is obsessed with stealing magical and supernatural artifacts.
- The Norman Osborn incarnation of the Green Goblin appears in the Spider-Man (1981) episode "Revenge of the Green Goblin", voiced by Neil Ross.
- The Norman Osborn incarnation of the Green Goblin appears in the Spider-Man and His Amazing Friends episode "Triumph of the Green Goblin", voiced by Dennis Marks.
- The Norman Osborn and Harry Osborn incarnations of the Green Goblin appear in Spider-Man: The Animated Series, voiced by Neil Ross and Gary Imhoff respectively. This version of Norman is the CEO of OsCorp who initially hires and arms the Hobgoblin to assassinate the Kingpin for threatening him, only for Spider-Man to foil his plan. Norman is later exposed to an experimental strength-enhancing gas and develops an alternate personality known as the Green Goblin. The Goblin attempts to eliminate Norman's enemies and, after learning of Spider-Man's secret identity as Harry's best friend Peter Parker, kidnaps his girlfriend Mary Jane Watson. In the ensuing battle, both the Goblin and Mary Jane fall into dimensional portals opened by a time dilation accelerator device. Trapped in limbo, the Goblin reaches out to Harry through a psychic link and convinces him to become the second Green Goblin to seek revenge against Peter, but Harry is defeated and sent to Ravencroft.
  - An alternate universe incarnation of Norman as the Green Goblin appears in the two-part series finale "Spider Wars". This version serves as an enforcer of Spider-Carnage alongside the Hobgoblin.
- A heroic, Counter-Earth incarnation of the Green Goblin appears in Spider-Man Unlimited (1999), voiced by Rino Romano. This version is Hector Jones, an ally of the Rejects, a group of Bestials that the High Evolutionary deemed useless and abandoned.
- Harry Osborn appears in Spider-Man: The New Animated Series, voiced by Ian Ziering, while Norman Osborn makes cameo appearances in hallucinations and photographs. Prior to the series, Norman operated as the Green Goblin and was killed in a battle against Spider-Man, causing Harry to despise Spider-Man without knowing that his best friend Peter Parker is his alter ego.
- The Norman Osborn incarnation of the Green Goblin and Harry Osborn appear in The Spectacular Spider-Man. Alan Rachins voiced Norman while Steve Blum provided his disguised Goblin voice, and James Arnold Taylor voiced Harry. This version of Norman is the ruthless head of OsCorp who believes he is incapable of failure and never apologizes, while Harry often seeks his father's approval and is jealous of Norman's bond with his best friend and Spider-Man's alter ego Peter Parker. Norman is initially hired by Tombstone to create supervillains to distract Spider-Man from interfering with his criminal operations, but Norman secretly exposes himself to a performance-enhancing formula and becomes the Green Goblin to seize control of the criminal underworld from Tombstone. Norman hires Chameleon as a body double and frames Harry for being the Goblin to redirect Spider-Man's suspicions, and later orchestrates a gang war between Tombstone, Doctor Octopus, and Silvermane to eliminate his opposition, allowing him to be New York City's new reigning "Big Man of Crime". He is seemingly killed during his final battle with Spider-Man in the series finale, but Norman survives and leaves to Florida while Harry blames Spider-Man for his father's alleged death.
- Several incarnations of the Green Goblin appear in Ultimate Spider-Man (2012).
  - Norman Osborn (voiced by Steven Weber) is Oscorp's manipulative CEO and Harry's estranged father. In the first season, he employs Doctor Octopus to aid him in his plot to obtain Spider-Man's DNA and create a "spider-soldier" army. This culminates in the Venom symbiote's creation and bonding to Harry before Doc Ock betrays Norman by injecting him with a serum mixed with Spider-Man and Venom's DNA, transforming him into the Green Goblin. In subsequent seasons, the Goblin acts as an alternate personality who enacts various schemes during which he mutates himself for further power before he's cured by Spider-Man to which Norman reforms himself as the superhero Iron Patriot and preserves Peter's secret identity out of respect.
  - Harry Osborn (voiced by Matt Lanter) is Peter Parker's best friend, Norman's estranged son, a student at Midtown High School, and a friend of Mary Jane Watson and Flash Thompson. During the first two seasons, Harry becomes the Venom symbiote's first and primary host and fights Spider-Man and his allies several times before eventually rejecting Venom's control. He also mends his relationship with Norman after his father is restored to normal. After making minor appearances in the third season, Harry joins Spider-Man in fighting crime in the fourth season as the superhero Patrioteer and temporarily forced to be the Anti-Venom symbiote's host to save Manhattan from Carnage before joining the S.H.I.E.L.D. Academy in the series finale.
  - Another version of Norman from an alternate dimension, based on the Ultimate Marvel incarnation of the character, appears in the third and fourth seasons. This version sports demonic wings.
  - A female alternate universe variant of Norman named Norma Osborn appears in the four-part episode "The Spider-Verse", voiced by Wendie Malick. This version is the archenemy of Petra Parker / Spider-Girl.
  - Nightmare shows a dream world incarnation of Norman who has mutated further into the Goblin King, the killer of most of Earth's heroes in the episode "Nightmare on Christmas".
- The Norman Osborn incarnation of the Green Goblin appears in Marvel Disk Wars: The Avengers, voiced by Yusuke Numata in Japanese and Kirk Thornton in English.
- The Norman Osborn incarnation of the Green Goblin appears in Marvel Future Avengers, voiced by Hiroshi Yanaka in Japanese and Dave Wittenberg in English.
- Harry Osborn and Norman Osborn appear in Marvel's Spider-Man (2017), voiced by Max Mittelman and Josh Keaton respectively. This version of Harry is the creator of Goblin technology, which he eventually uses to fight crime as the superhero Hobgoblin, while Norman is Harry's strict father and Oscorp's original CEO who gets mutated into the Spider-King and impersonated the Hobgoblin before eventually turning himself into the Dark Goblin.
- The Norman Osborn incarnation of the Green Goblin appears in Marvel Super Hero Adventures, voiced by Sam Vincent.
- The Norman Osborn incarnation of the Green Goblin appears in Lego Marvel Spider-Man: Vexed by Venom, voiced by Josh Keaton.
- The Norman Osborn incarnation of the Green Goblin appears in Spidey and His Amazing Friends, voiced by JP Karliak. This version seeks to play tricks on the general public and humiliate Spidey and his friends rather than commit crimes.

== Film ==
=== Sam Raimi film series ===
Willem Dafoe as Norman Osborn / Green Goblin in Spider-Man.

The Norman and Harry Osborn incarnations of the Green Goblin appear in Sam Raimi's Spider-Man trilogy, portrayed by Willem Dafoe and James Franco respectively.

- The Osborns first appear in Spider-Man (2002), with Norman initially serving as a father figure and mentor to Peter Parker while Harry is Parker's best friend and Mary Jane Watson's boyfriend who longs to impress his distant father. After experimenting on himself with an unstable strength enhancer to save his company, Oscorp, from bankruptcy, Norman develops a crazed alternate personality dubbed the "Green Goblin". While in control of Norman's body, the Goblin uses stolen experimental armor and advanced weaponry to exact revenge on their enemies, seeing Norman as too "weak" to do so himself. This brings him into conflict with Spider-Man, whom the Goblin initially tries to persuade to join him before resolving to attack his loved ones upon deducing his identity as Parker. After Norman is fatally impaled by his glider during his final battle with Spider-Man, the latter brings his body home, where Harry sees them and mistakenly assumes that Spider-Man killed his father, vowing revenge. Amidst this, Watson breaks up with Harry to be with Parker.
- In Spider-Man 2 (2004), Norman serves as a ghostly presence to Harry, who has taken over Oscorp and still seeks revenge on Spider-Man. Harry strikes a deal with Otto Octavius to retrieve Spider-Man in exchange for giving the latter tritium to complete his experiment, only to learn Parker is Spider-Man. Following this, Harry is initially reluctant to take vengeance on his best friend despite his father's urging, after which he stumbles upon Norman's secret lair and discovers that he was the Green Goblin.
- In Spider-Man 3 (2007), Harry becomes the New Goblin to avenge his father, but accidentally gets partial amnesia. After he recovers, he sabotages Parker and Watson's relationship as part of a scheme to emotionally hurt Parker. Upon learning the truth of Norman's death from his butler Bernard, Harry reconciles and joins forces with Parker to save Watson from Venom and the Sandman before sacrificing himself to save Parker from the former.

=== The Amazing Spider-Man film series ===
- Norman Osborn is mentioned in The Amazing Spider-Man (2012) as the founder of Oscorp who is dying from an unknown disease.
- Norman and Harry Osborn appear in The Amazing Spider-Man 2 (2014), portrayed by Chris Cooper and Dane DeHaan, respectively. In this film, the disease is revealed to be the fictional "retroviral hyperplasia", a genetic disease that has afflicted the Osborns for generations. After Norman's death, the returning Harry is made CEO and tries to find the missing Richard Parker's data in the hopes that it will save his life. Harry later becomes the Green Goblin as a side effect of the cure for the hyperplasia and swears vengeance on Peter Parker because he refused a blood transfusion that Harry thought could save him. He kills Gwen Stacy in front of Parker.
- Cooper and DeHaan were set to reprise their roles in a Sinister Six spin-off film and a third The Amazing Spider-Man film before both were cancelled.

=== Sony's Spider-Verse ===
The Norman Osborn incarnation of the Green Goblin appears in Spider-Man: Into the Spider-Verse, voiced by Jorma Taccone. This version is primarily inspired by the Ultimate Marvel iteration coupled with visual elements from various other previous incarnations. Additionally, he works as an enforcer for the Kingpin. While fighting Spider-Man to protect the Kingpin's Super-Collider, the Goblin shoves the former into it, resulting in an explosion that severely injures Spider-Man and kills the Goblin.

The Spider-Man (1982) incarnation of Norman Osborn / Green Goblin makes a cameo appearance in Spider-Man: Across the Spider-Verse as a prisoner of Miguel O'Hara's Spider-Society after being displaced from his home reality.

== Marvel Cinematic Universe ==
=== Spider-Man: No Way Home ===
The Sam Raimi Spider-Man trilogy incarnation of Norman Osborn / Green Goblin appears in the Marvel Cinematic Universe (MCU) film Spider-Man: No Way Home (2021), portrayed again by Willem Dafoe. Prior to his death, he is transported to another universe due to its version of Peter Parker (later dubbed "Peter-One") botching Doctor Strange's spell to make everyone forget his identity as Spider-Man, which instead results in people from across the multiverse who know Parker's identity as Spider-Man being brought to their universe. While battling the Goblin persona and attempting to regain his bearings, a lost and overwhelmed Norman seeks refuge at May Parker's shelter and meets Peter-One before being imprisoned in the New York Sanctum alongside other alternate universe-displaced supervillains. Peter-One attempts to cure them in the hopes of averting their original fates upon returning them to their respective universes, but the Goblin persona takes over Norman's body and convinces the other villains to fight back instead. In the ensuing battle, he kills May in an attempt to corrupt Peter-One before escaping. After the other villains are defeated and cured by Peter-One, his own Parker ("Peter-Two"), and another version ("Peter-Three"), the Goblin breaks the barrier between universes, fights Peter-One, and goads the latter into killing him, only to be foiled by Peter-Two. Afterwards, Peter-One and Three cure Osborn, ridding him of the Goblin persona, before Strange casts another spell to return all of the displaced individuals to their original universes.

=== Your Friendly Neighborhood Spider-Man ===
Norman and Harry Osborn appear in Your Friendly Neighborhood Spider-Man, voiced by Colman Domingo and Zeno Robinson, respectively. These versions are African-American. The series explores Norman's "evolution" into his Green Goblin persona over multiple seasons.

== Video games ==
=== Spider-Man games ===
- The Norman Osborn incarnation of the Green Goblin appears as a boss in Spider-Man (1982).
- The Norman Osborn incarnation of the Green Goblin appears as a boss in Spider-Man: The Video Game.
- The Norman Osborn incarnation of the Green Goblin appears a boss in Spider-Man (1995).
- The Norman Osborn incarnation of the Green Goblin appears as a boss in The Amazing Spider-Man: Lethal Foes.
- The Norman Osborn incarnation of the Green Goblin appears as the final boss of the Spider-Man (2002) film tie-in game, voiced by Willem Dafoe. In a departure from the film's plot, Osborn and his scientists initially attempt to capture Spider-Man to study his genetics and perfect their super-soldier serum. To do so, they create and send several flying robots and Spider-Slayers to track him down, but both of these attempts fail. After being fired for taking too much time to develop the serum, Osborn tests it on himself, which leads to his transformation into the Goblin. From here, the game's plot closely follows the film's.
  - The Harry Osborn incarnation of the Green Goblin (voiced by Josh Keaton) appears as an unlockable playable character and has an additional storyline in the game, wherein he becomes the new Green Goblin after his father's death and investigates a plot to take over Oscorp while battling a separate Goblin who claims to have been hired by Norman.
- Harry Osborn, based on James Franco's portrayal, appears in the Spider-Man 2 film tie-in game, voiced again by Josh Keaton.
- The Ultimate Marvel incarnation of Norman Osborn / Green Goblin appears as a boss in Ultimate Spider-Man (2005), voiced by Peter Lurie.
- The Ultimate Marvel incarnation of Norman Osborn / Green Goblin appears as a playable character in and the final boss of Spider-Man: Battle for New York, voiced by Neil Kaplan.
- Harry Osborn / New Goblin appears as a boss and playable character in the Spider-Man 3 film tie-in game, voiced by James Franco. While normally unplayable outside of the final mission of the game, the New Goblin was later released as DLC, which was initially available for the Xbox 360 version and the Collector's Edition of the PlayStation 3 version before it was later added to all other platforms.

The Green Goblin as he appears in Spider-Man: Friend or Foe.

- Norman Osborn / Green Goblin and Harry Osborn / New Goblin, both based on the Sam Raimi trilogy incarnations, appear as unlockable playable characters in Spider-Man: Friend or Foe, voiced by Roger L. Jackson and again by Josh Keaton respectively. The Green Goblin and several other supervillains attack Spider-Man, who defeats them with help from the New Goblin, before they are all attacked and captured by Mysterio's P.H.A.N.T.O.M.s. The Green Goblin is subsequently placed under mind control and sent to retrieve a meteor shard from Tokyo. There, Spider-Man defeats the Goblin and frees him before the latter joins forces with Spider-Man to exact revenge on Mysterio.
- The Norman Osborn incarnation of the Green Goblin appears as an optional assist character in the Nintendo DS version of Spider-Man: Web of Shadows, voiced again by Roger L. Jackson. After Black Cat informs Spider-Man that the Goblin is planting bombs in an attempt to thwart a symbiote invasion, Spider-Man is given the choice of helping him twice.
- The Ultimate Marvel incarnation of the Green Goblin appears in Ultimate Spider-Man: Total Mayhem.
- The Marvel Noir incarnation of Norman "The Goblin" Osborn appears as a boss in Spider-Man: Shattered Dimensions, voiced by Jim Cummings. He tasks his enforcers Hammerhead and the Vulture with retrieving fragments of the Tablet of Order and Chaos. Though Spider-Man Noir manages to keep most of them out of his possession, Osborn eventually obtains one and absorbs its power, transforming into a monstrous beast with incredible strength. Despite this, the process opens a massive sore on his back that becomes his only weak point. He lures Spider-Man Noir to his carnival hideout, but the latter defeats the Goblin and his men and claims his fragment.
- The Norman Osborn incarnation of the Green Goblin appears in Pinball FX 2.
- The Harry Osborn incarnation of the Green Goblin, based on Dane DeHaan's portrayal, appears in The Amazing Spider-Man 2 film tie-in game, voiced by Kevin Dorman. Similarly to the film, Harry becomes the CEO of Oscorp after his father dies from a terminal illness and later discovers that he is slowly dying from the same illness, becoming desperate for a cure. In a departure from the film's plot, Harry also works with Wilson Fisk to finance the Enhanced Crime Task Force, ostensibly to help the police contain criminals more easily, unaware that Fisk is planning to use it to replace Spider-Man and eventually take over Oscorp once Harry dies. After discovering that Spider-Man's blood could help cure him, Harry asks for his help, but Spider-Man refuses out of fear of the side effects, leading Harry to despise him. Harry later injects himself with Richard Parker's spider venom in the hopes of curing his illness, but it disfigures him and drives him insane. Adopting the Green Goblin alias, he attacks Spider-Man, but is defeated and incarcerated.
  - In the mobile version, the Goblin is a supervillain working for Oscorp who attacks Spider-Man twice in an attempt to collect his blood for Oscorp's experiments as well as exact revenge on him for interfering with Oscorp's illicit businesses.
- The mainstream and "House of M" incarnations of the Green Goblin appear as bosses in Spider-Man Unlimited (2014). They are assembled from their respective alternate realities to join a multiversal Sinister Six and invade other dimensions, destroy their respective Spider-Men, and collect iso-8 crystals. Additionally, Norman Osborn as the Red Goblin was added as a playable character in a later update.

==== Marvel's Spider-Man series ====
Norman and Harry Osborn appear in Insomniac Games' Marvel's Spider-Man series, with Norman voiced by Mark Rolston and Harry voiced by Scott Porter in Marvel's Spider-Man (2018) and Graham Phillips in Marvel's Spider-Man 2. Additionally, Norman's wife and Harry's mother, Emily Osborn, makes cameo appearances via photographs.

- Norman Osborn is the corrupt and self-serving former CEO and co-founder of Oscorp alongside his former best friend and college lab partner Otto Octavius, with whom he became estranged after the latter left the company due to its unethical experiments. One of these experiments was "Devil's Breath", a medical treatment for genetic disorders that more closely resembles a bio-weapon, which Norman created in a desperate effort to save Emily and later Harry, both of whom suffered from the same terminal illness, the fictional Oshtoran syndrome. When Harry's condition worsened, Norman placed him in stasis until a cure could be found while claiming to his friends Peter Parker and Mary Jane Watson that Harry was in Europe managing Oscorp's international affairs. Having become the mayor of New York City as of the present, he uses his position to implement Oscorp technology throughout the city and shut down government funding for Octavius Industries in a thinly veiled attempt to get Octavius to rejoin Oscorp, though Octavius refuses out of contempt. Norman also attempts to have Parker, who is working as Octavius' assistant, join Oscorp by using his friendship with Harry, though Parker also refuses. Martin Li, one of Oscorp's former test subjects who gained superpowers and accidentally killed his parents after being injected with Devil's Breath, begins terrorizing New York to seek revenge on Norman. These incidences soon inspire Octavius to pursue his own vendetta against his former friend and eventually form an alliance with Li and some of Spider-Man's other enemies to attack Oscorp properties and steal Devil's Breath to infect New York and expose Norman's crimes. In response, Norman declares martial law and hires mercenaries contracted from Sable International to protect New York's citizens while blaming Spider-Man for the chaos and branding him a fugitive. While Spider-Man is able to defeat the villains, contain the resulting damage, and save Norman's life, the latter's role in creating Devil's Breath is exposed, leading to Norman resigning from the mayor's office in disgrace.
- Harry is Peter Parker and Mary Jane Watson's best friend who is aware of his father's dishonesty and selfishness, but genuinely loves him nonetheless and, unlike him, is selfless and caring towards others. He was inspired by his mother, Emily, to study environmental law and used Oscorp's resources to install various research stations across New York to monitor environmental conditions, which Spider-Man visits and helps out with as part of a side mission in Spider-Man (2018). Despite suffering from Oshtoran Syndrome, which killed Emily, Harry kept this from his friends through the guise of constant business and partying making him feel worn out. Harry asked Norman to reveal the truth should his condition get worse, though the latter secretly refused and put him in stasis, trying several risky methods to save his son, such as the Devil's Breath virus and a black, web-like symbiote. After spending over a year in stasis and covered by the black substance, Harry awakens, prompting Norman to order Oscorp scientist Curt Connors, who was monitoring his condition, to release him in spite of possible side effects.
- Norman and Harry Osborn both appear in Marvel's Spider-Man 2. Upon being released, Harry reconnects with Peter and Mary Jane and establishes the Emily-May Foundation with his father's financing to "heal the world" as the symbiote gradually heals and enhances him, offering Peter a job by his side. After discovering Peter's secret identity, Harry attempts to use the symbiote to become a superhero until it transfers itself to Peter to save his life after the latter is mortally wounded by Kraven the Hunter. Slowly dying without the symbiote, Harry asks for it back, but Peter, under its corrupting influence, refuses, fracturing their friendship. After eventually removing the symbiote, Harry confronts Peter and re-bonds with it, transforming the former into Venom, who then escapes into New York and kills Kraven. Perverting his dream of healing the world, Venom convinces Harry to infect New York with more symbiotes until Peter, Mary Jane, and Miles Morales eventually kill Venom at Harry's insistence, though he is put into a coma. Blaming the Spider-Men for this, an enraged Norman orders his scientists to use "G-serum" on Harry and visits an imprisoned Octavius in a failed attempt at learning the Spider-Men's identities.

=== Other games ===
- The Sam Raimi Spider-Man trilogy's incarnation of Norman Osborn / Green Goblin appears in the Spider-Man Trilogy pinball machine.
- The Norman Osborn incarnation of the Green Goblin appears as a playable character in Marvel: Ultimate Alliance 2, voiced by Armin Shimerman. This version's default appearance is based on Norman's Thunderbolts design. He is among several supervillains controlled by S.H.I.E.L.D.'s nanites until they go rogue when the nanites attain sentience.
- The Norman Osborn incarnation of the Green Goblin appears as an alternate skin for Firebrand in Ultimate Marvel vs. Capcom 3.
- Norman Osborn as the Green Goblin and Iron Patriot appears in Marvel Super Hero Squad Online, with the former identity (voiced by Yuri Lowenthal and Phil LaMarr) appearing as a boss while the latter (voiced by Charlie Adler) appears as a playable character.
- The Norman Osborn incarnation of the Green Goblin appears in LittleBigPlanet via the "Marvel Costume Kit 4" DLC.
- The Norman Osborn incarnation of the Green Goblin appears as a boss in Marvel Avengers Alliance.
- The Norman Osborn incarnation of the Green Goblin appears as a playable character in Marvel Heroes, voiced by Travis Willingham.
- The Norman Osborn incarnation of the Green Goblin appears as a playable character and boss in Lego Marvel Super Heroes, voiced by Nolan North.
  - Additionally, the Ultimate Spider-Man (2012) incarnation of Norman Osborn / Green Goblin appears as a playable character, voiced by John DiMaggio.
- Norman Osborn as the Green Goblin, Iron Patriot, and Red Goblin appear as separate playable characters in Marvel Contest of Champions.
- The Ultimate Spider-Man (2012) incarnation of Norman Osborn / Green Goblin appears as a playable character and boss in Disney Infinity 2.0, voiced by Nolan North.
- Norman Osborn as the Iron Patriot and the mainstream, Ultimate Marvel, and No Way Home incarnations of the Green Goblin appears as a playable character in Marvel: Future Fight.
- The Ultimate Spider-Man (2012) incarnation of the Green Goblin appears as a playable character in Disney Infinity 3.0.
- A modernized incarnation of the Green Goblin appears in Marvel: Avengers Alliance 2.
- The Norman Osborn incarnation of the Green Goblin appears as a playable character in Marvel Puzzle Quest.
- The Norman Osborn incarnation of the Green Goblin appears as a playable character in Marvel Avengers Academy, voiced by Brandon Winckler.
- The Norman Osborn incarnation of the Green Goblin appears as a playable character in Lego Marvel Super Heroes 2. Additionally, his Marvel 2099 counterpart is also playable and serves as a boss.
- Norman Osborn as the Green Goblin and Iron Patriot appear as playable characters in Marvel Strike Force. The former persona appears as a member of the Sinister Six, while the latter is a member of the Cabal.
- The Norman Osborn incarnation of the Green Goblin appears as a boss in Marvel Ultimate Alliance 3: The Black Order, voiced again by Steve Blum. While leading the Sinister Six in a hostile takeover of the Raft, he obtains the Time Stone due to Star-Lord teleporting the Infinity Stones across the universe. However, the Goblin succumbs to its power and becomes trapped in a time loop until he witnesses a vision of Thanos with all six stones standing atop Earth's heroes' bodies. Spider-Man offers the Goblin a second chance to save the universe before Thanos claims the Infinity Stones, but the Goblin is left severely traumatized by the vision.
- The Norman Osborn incarnation of the Green Goblin makes a cameo appearance in Marvel vs. Capcom: Infinite.
- The Norman Osborn incarnation of the Green Goblin appears as an alternate skin in Fortnite Battle Royale.
- The Norman Osborn incarnation of the Green Goblin appears in Marvel Future Revolution, voiced again by Steve Blum.
- The Norman Osborn incarnation of the Green Goblin will appear in Marvel Tokon: Fighting Souls, voiced again by Steve Blum in English, with Kazuhiro Yamaji reprises from dubbing Willem Dafoe's character in Japanese. This version is a member of the Knights of Doom. While planning to run a presidency of United States, he, alongside Magneto and Carnage, are recruited by Doctor Doom to assist him in defeating the Champion of the Universe.

== Miscellaneous ==
- The Norman Osborn incarnation of the Green Goblin appears in Universal Orlando Resort's Islands of Adventure.
- The Norman Osborn incarnation of the Green Goblin appears in the live adaptation of Spider-Man and Mary Jane Watson's wedding.
- The Norman Osborn incarnation of the Green Goblin appears in Spider-Man: Turn Off the Dark. As revenge for abandoning him and Oscorp, he brainwashes six scientists and turns them into his Sinister Six.
- The Norman Osborn incarnation of the Green Goblin appears in Marvel Universe Live! as a member of the Sinister Six.
- Norman and Harry Osborn appear in Absolute Carnage: Marvel Ultimate Comics, voiced by Giles Panton and Lee Majdoub respectively.
- The giant Green Goblin mask with glowing red eyes is mounted on the front of the vehicle-come-to-life antagonist semitruck in the movie Maximum Overdrive.

== Merchandise ==
Various figures of Norman Osborn / Green Goblin from the Spider-Man: The Movie toyline.

- The Green Goblin received several figures from Mego.
- An "Energized" Green Goblin received a figure from Remco.
- A Green Goblin figurine was included as an accessory in Corgi's "Spider-Buggy" vehicle set.
- The Green Goblin received a figure in Toy Biz's Marvel Superheroes line.
- The Green Goblin received a figure in Series 3 of Toy Biz's Spider-Man: The Animated Series tie-in line, with his glider being based on the one seen in issues 199 & 200 of The Spectacular Spider-Man (1993).
- The Green Goblin received eight figures in Toy Biz's Spider-Man: The Movie toy line.
- The Green Goblin received a figure in Toy Biz's Marvel Legends line via the "Onslaught Series" sub-line.
- The mainstream and Ultimate Marvel incarnations of the Green Goblin received bobble-heads from Way Out Toys.
- The Green Goblin received a figurine in The Classic Marvel Figurine Collection.
- The Green Goblin received two figures in Diamond Select Toys' Marvel Select line.
- The Green Goblin received a bobble-head in Funko's Wacky Wobbler line.
- The Green Goblin received a figure in Funko's Pop! vinyl figure line.
- The Green Goblin received a figure in Hasbro's Marvel Legends line.

== Miscellaneous ==
In the BBC radio adaptation of the Spider Man comics, the Green Goblin is portrayed by Jonathan Kydd.
