= Major Force =

DC comics fictional character

- Major Force, as depicted on the splashpage of Green Lantern #37 (July 2026), art by Xermanico.

Publication information
- Publisher: DC Comics
- First appearance: Captain Atom (vol. 2) #12 (February 1988)
- Created by: Cary Bates (writer); Greg Weisman (writer); Pat Broderick (artist)

In-story information
- Alter ego: Clifford Zmeck
- Species: Metahuman
- Place of origin: Earth
- Team affiliations: Injustice League; S.H.A.D.E. Suicide Squad
- Notable aliases: Boltan, Black Jack
- Abilities: Superhuman strength, speed, endurance and stamina Invulnerability; Healing factor Can project and control dark matter and dark quantum energy Dark matter transmutation Immortality; Flight; Vuldarian shapeshifting

Major Force (Clifford Zmeck) is a supervillain appearing in comic books published by DC Comics. Major Force is the evil foil personality of the superhero Captain Atom, with both having gained their powers from an experiment overseen by General Wade Eiling. In later appearances, he also serves as an enemy to Green Lantern (Kyle Rayner, Guy Gardner, and Hal Jordan).

== Publication history ==
Major Force first appeared in Captain Atom (vol. 3) #12 (February 1988) and was created by Cary Bates, Greg Weisman, and Pat Broderick.

== Fictional character biography ==
=== Early life ===
Major Force is a product of the same U.S. Federal project which created Captain Atom during the Vietnam War. The government, in a project headed by Wade Eiling and the scientist Megala, experiments with the effects of atomic energy on an alien metal to determine its full protective abilities such as protecting a human being from a nuclear blast. After Nathaniel Adam's disappearance and the perceived failure of the Captain Atom Project, the government restarts the project with a new test subject named Clifford Zmeck and increased the amount of metal used. While in the Air Force, Zmeck is imprisoned on charges of rape and murder and sentenced to life in prison. However, he is offered a pardon in exchange for participation in the high-risk governmental experiment. Zmeck disappears into the Quantum Field, emerging one year after the return of Nathaniel Adam with abilities similar to his.

=== Crime and punishment ===
In Green Lantern (vol. 3) #54 (August 1994), Major Force kills Alexandra DeWitt, girlfriend of Green Lantern Kyle Rayner, and stuffs her remains in a refrigerator for Kyle to find. Kyle tortures Major Force after their fight, but is stopped by the Los Angeles Police Department. In an issue of Guy Gardner: Warrior, Major Force seemingly kills Guy Gardner's mother in the same manner as Alex. Gardner, who has awakened his Vuldarian abilities, kills Major Force with a shifted weapon's edge. The Quorum, who previously hired Major Force to harass Rayner and Gardner, resurrect him and enhance him with Vuldarian DNA. Major Force kills Arisia Rrab, a Green Lantern and friend of Gardner, as a declaration of war against him.

=== Superman/Batman: Public Enemies ===
In Superman/Batman, Major Force appears as part of a government task force led by Captain Atom, in addition to Power Girl, Starfire, Katana, and Black Lightning. President Lex Luthor tasks the group with capturing Superman as a Kryptonite asteroid is headed for Earth. Superman and Batman escape the group in Washington, D.C., but meet up with them again in Tokyo. When Captain Atom and his squad pursue them to Japan, Power Girl and Katana reveal they are double agents working with Superman and Batman. Power Girl strikes at Major Force. When Major Force returns fire, Katana chops his hands off, releasing the atomic energy he harbors. Batman convinces Captain Atom to absorb the energy leaking from Major Force, which threatens to decimate the city. Captain Atom absorbs all the energy and disappears, traveling several years into the future.

=== "One Year Later" ===
Major Force reappears in Battle for Blüdhaven, a series set a year after the events of Infinite Crisis, as the leader of project S.H.A.D.E. In issue #5, Major Force brutally beats Outsiders member Major Victory and rips off his right arm. He also picks a fight with Hal Jordan, having vowed to kill Green Lanterns on sight after his last encounter with Kyle Rayner. Captain Atom drains Major Force of his energy, leaving him a deflated husk.

Major Force is later seen reconstituted and a part of a new regiment of S.H.A.D.E. soldiers. A battle ensues with Uncle Sam and the Freedom Fighters for the soul of America, wherein Major Force is quickly dispatched by Miss America. Major Force later appears as a member of the Secret Society during the wedding of Green Arrow and Black Canary.

=== The New 52 ===
In The New 52 continuity reboot, Major Force is a government agent working under Wade Eiling, with a special rank that allows him to represent all branches of the military. He seeks to protect Firestorm from villains and convince him to work for the government. However, Major Force comes to view Firestorm as a threat to national security and becomes his enemy. After helping out in a battle between Firestorm and several villains, Major Force knocks out Firestorm and takes him to Eiling. However, Superman confronts Major Force and Eiling and forces them to give Firestorm up.

Major Force is implied to be the same character as Black Jack, an agent of the Black Razors who was introduced in Voodoo.

== Powers and abilities ==
Major Force is coated with the same Dilustel alien alloy that covers Captain Atom. As a result, he also can access the Quantum Field and use its energies for a variety of powers. Cracking or rupturing his Dilustel skin causes Major Force to leak radiation at an uncontrollable rate, to which he runs the risk of atomic detonation.

Major Force can project blasts of dark matter and shape the energy into various forms. He initially lacked the ability to fly, but rather leapt great distances or traveled on ramps made of dark matter. Major Force is also able to convert whatever force he comes in contact with, be it matter or energy, into solid dark matter.

Major Force possesses immense strength and durability, around the same level as Captain Atom and Superman. Major Force lacks the need for physical sustenance thanks to the Dilustel's connection to the Q-Field, allowing to survive indefinitely without need to eat, sleep, breath or rest, and survive in the vacuum of space. Due to his nature as pure energy, Major Force is functionally immortal.

Clifford Zmeck is a military-trained United States Air Force operative. He has vast military connections with the government, Checkmate, Task Force X, and Quorum.

== Other versions ==
Q-Ranger, a heroic, alternate universe version of Major Force from the antimatter universe, appears in JLA Secret Files as a member of the Justice Underground.

== In other media ==
=== Television ===
Major Force appears in the Batman: The Brave and the Bold episode "Powerless!", voiced by Fred Tatasciore.

=== Film ===
Major Force appears in Superman/Batman: Public Enemies, voiced by Ricardo Chavira. This version can fly and his role plays out similarly to the comics version before Power Girl unintentionally kills him.

=== Video games ===
- Major Force appears as a boss in DC Universe Online, voiced by Alexander Brandon. This version works for Amanda Waller.
- Major Force appears as a character summon in Scribblenauts Unmasked: A DC Comics Adventure.
