= The Refrigerator Monologues =

2017 novel by Catherynne Valente

- First edition
- Author: Catherynne Valente
- Language: English
- Publication date: 2017

The Refrigerator Monologues is a 2017 superhero fiction novel by Catherynne Valente, with art by Annie Wu, exploring the lives - and deaths - of superheroines, and of the girlfriends of superheroes; the title refers to "women in refrigerators", and to The Vagina Monologues. It was published by Saga Press.

== Synopsis ==
In a corner of the afterlife, six women meet on a regular basis to commiserate and share their stories. They have all been involved in the world of superheroes and suffered because of it, facing various forms of sexism from heroes and villains alike. Their afterlife, Deadtown, is a mix between a pleasant bohemian neighborhood and a forbidding necropolis. It is populated by a race of friendly, cultured gargoyles who do their best to take care of the ghosts. People frequently leave Deadtown (either willingly or unwillingly) due to the unreliable nature of comic book deaths. They enjoy extinct food and forgotten culture, sharing their stories in order to pass the time. Everyone in Deadtown is forced to wear the clothes they were buried in, even if those clothes say nothing about their real natures.

Each woman is a parody of a famous character from the mainstream Marvel or DC universe, retelling their famous storylines from a new, feminist perspective. Their group is known as the Hell Hath Club, with Paige Embry (an alternate version of Gwen Stacy) serving as the primary keeper of their stories and the group's unofficial leader. She also provides connecting narration for each of the stories. The novella examines the double standards of superheroics, along with the "women in refrigerators" practice of killing or torturing female characters in order to assist male character development. The characters consider themselves "released" from the dark and painful world of superhero storylines, ending the book with a punk rock celebration.

== Reception ==
Publishers Weekly called it "dazzling", "brilliantly furious", and "a rage-filled pleasure", and noted that "no comic book expertise is required" — although the Portland Press-Herald felt that it "depends a great deal on an insider's knowledge of comic book lore for maximum enjoyment".

Den of Geek described it as "cathartically angry", and commended the "vivid, specific voice" of each character. Vox stated that it was "bitingly sarcastic and wistfully regretful, and always ferociously angry". Kirkus Reviews judged it to be "entertaining but not a romp", and "ruthless but absorbing and provocative", while the Washington Post considered it to be "entertaining but heavy-handed".

== Origins ==
Valente was inspired to write the book as a result of her anger at the death of Gwen Stacy in the 2014 film The Amazing Spider-Man 2. She said of the character's death,

[I]t blindsided me in a way that Gwen Stacy taking her dive should never blindside anyone born after 1970, and it was a sucker punch, because more or less the last thing Emma Stone [as Gwen Stacy] does before she quite literally flounces off to meet her doom is snit, "Nobody makes my decisions for me, nobody! This is my choice. Mine." ... [S]omeone chose to give her those words. ... To make those powerful words the punchline to a sad joke about female agency by punishing her for them, by making sure that no matter how modern and independent the new Gwen might seem, everything is just as it has always been. That old, familiar message slides into our brains with the warm familiarity of a father’s hug: when women make their own choices, disaster results.

== Adaptation ==
In December 2018, Amazon Studios announced that Shauna Cross was developing a pilot episode for an adaptation of The Refrigerator Monologues, to be titled "Deadtown".
