= Possum Trot =

Possum Trot or Possumtrot may refer to:

== Settlements in the United States ==
- Possum Trot, Alabama
- Possum Trot, Kentucky
- Possum Trot, Missouri
- Possum Trot, Texas
- Possum Trot, Virginia
- The former name of Red Oak, Texas

== Other ==
- Possum Trot, California - Name of the property where folk artist Calvin Black created and displayed his dolls
- Possum Trot Corporation, Kentucky - a children's stuffed animal toy company.
- Possumtrot Branch, a stream in Georgia
- The Dogtrot house, also known as a possum-trot
- Sound of Hope: The Story of Possum Trot, a 2024 film
