= X24 =

X24 may refer to:

- X-24 (comics), a character appearing in American comic books published by DC Comics
- X-24 (Logan), a character in the 2017 film Logan
- X24 (New York City bus)
- HMS X24, a British X-class submarine
- Martin Marietta X-24, an American experimental aircraft
- Snapdragon X24 LTE, a modem
- ThinkPad X24, a notebook computer
- X24 engine, a piston engine
