= List of Spider-Man film cast members =

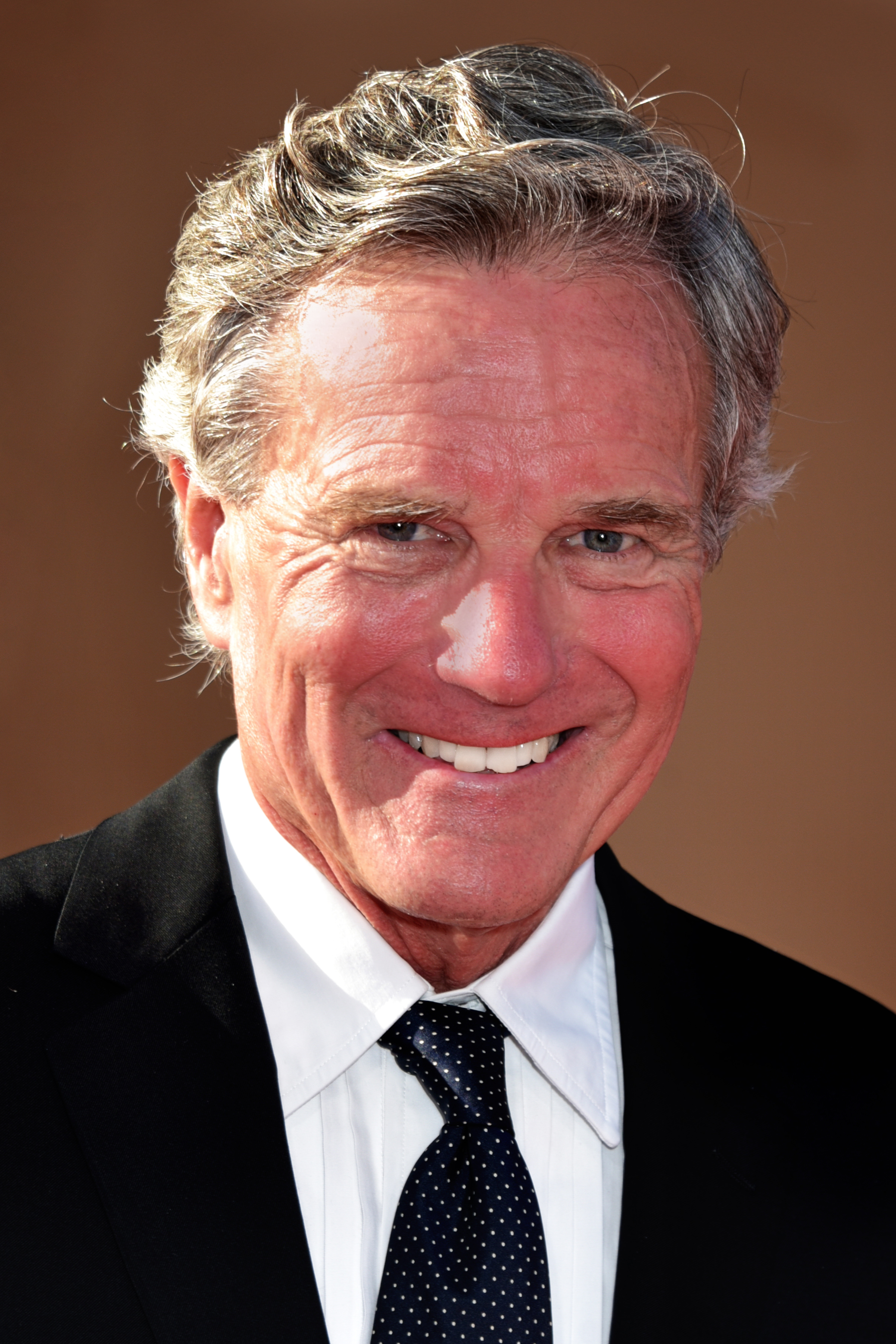
Nicholas Hammond

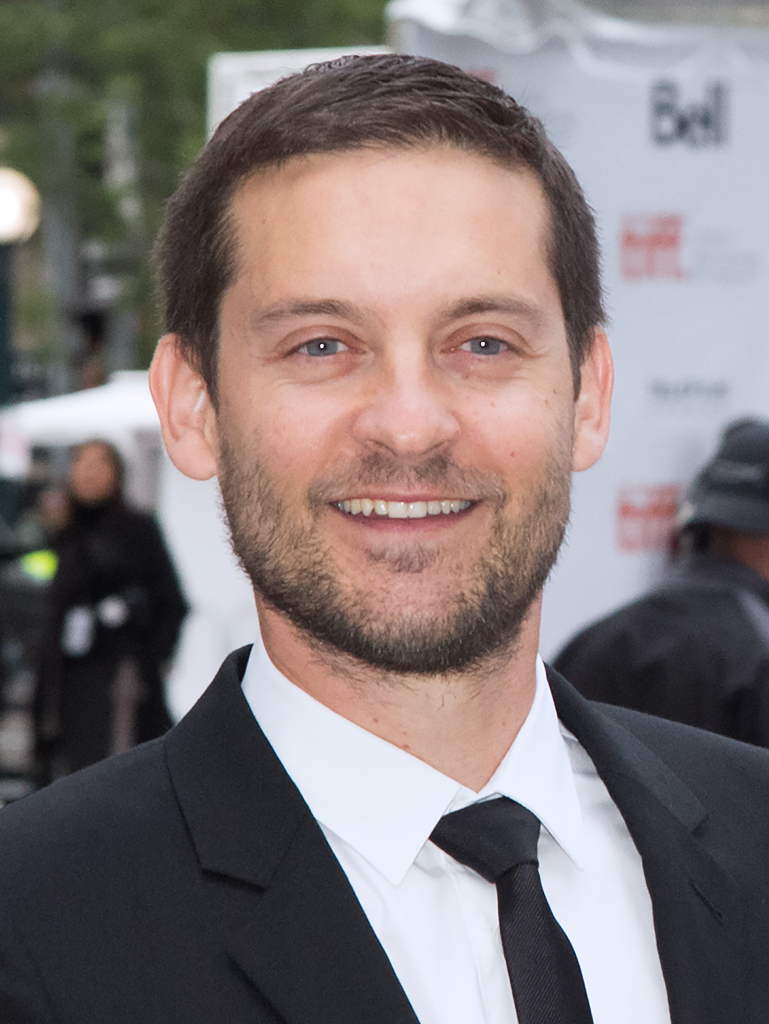
Tobey Maguire

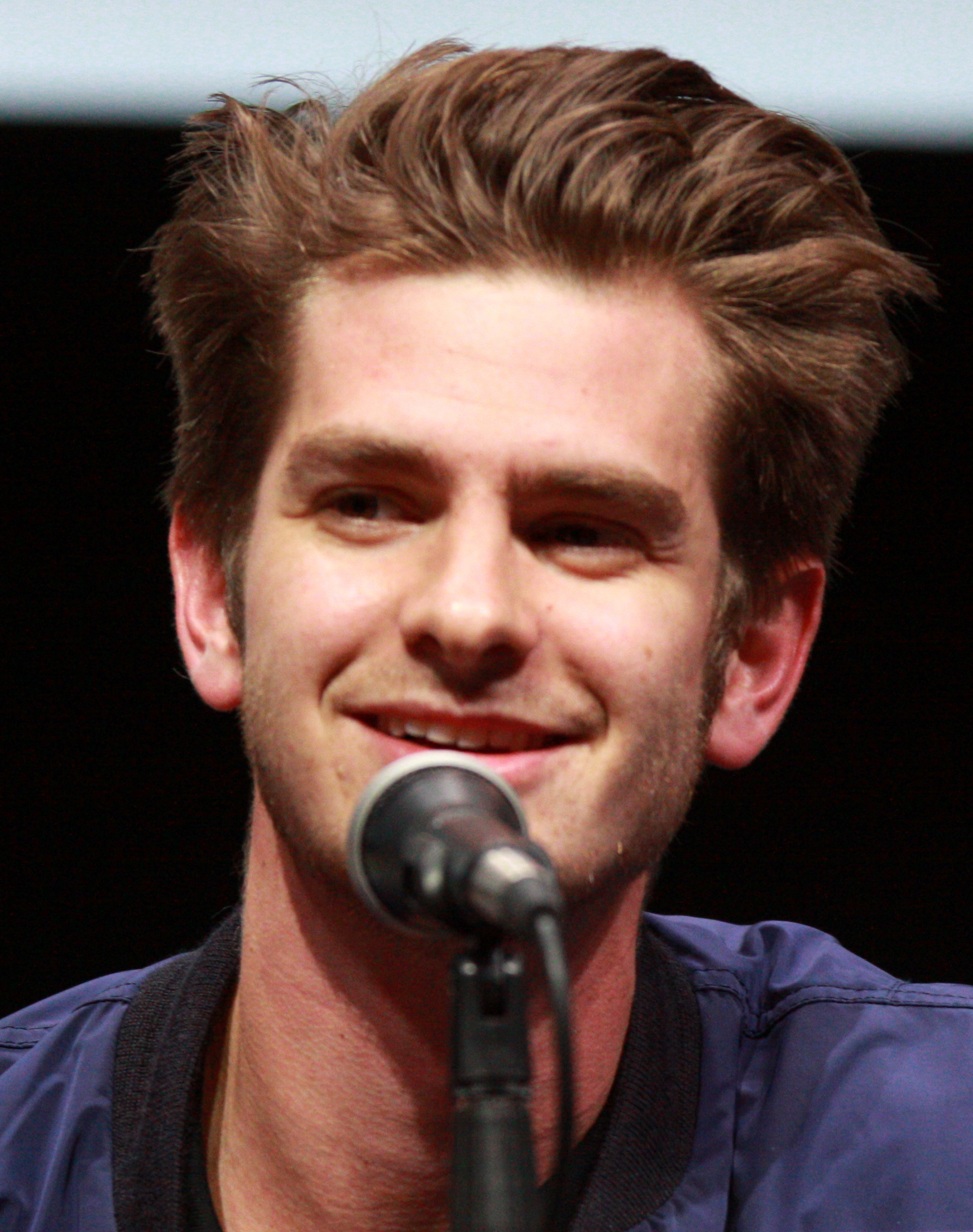
Andrew Garfield

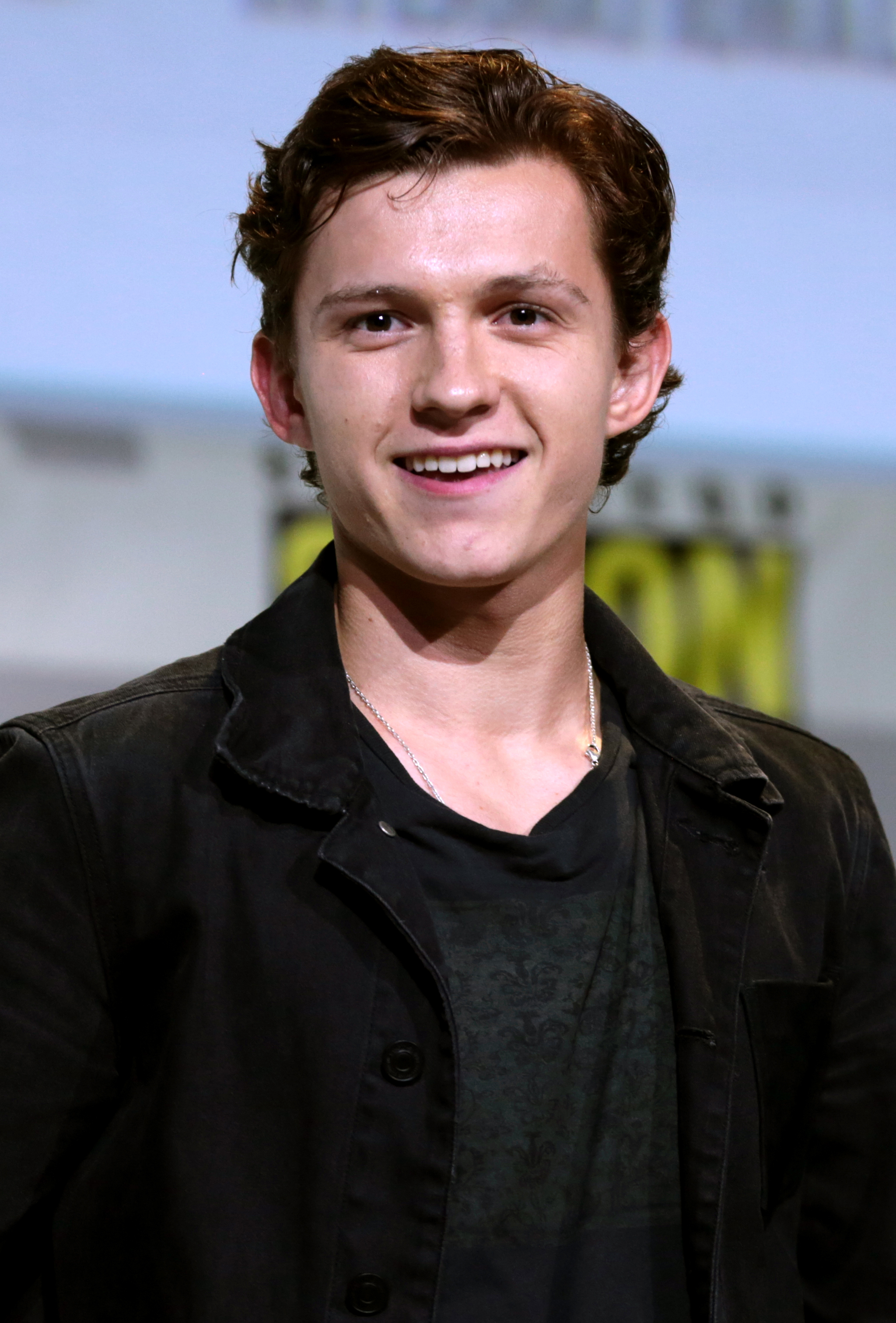
Tom Holland

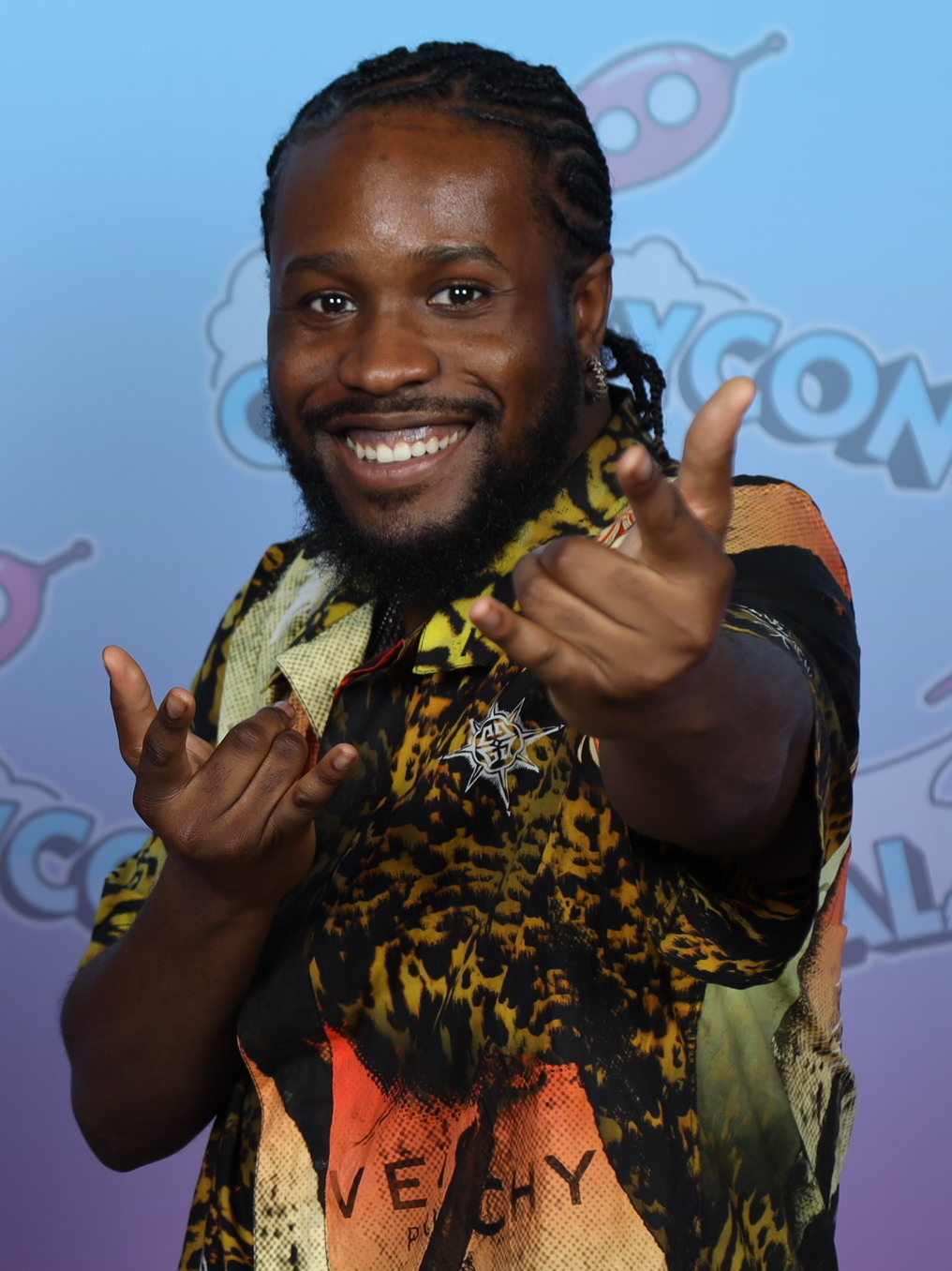
Shameik Moore

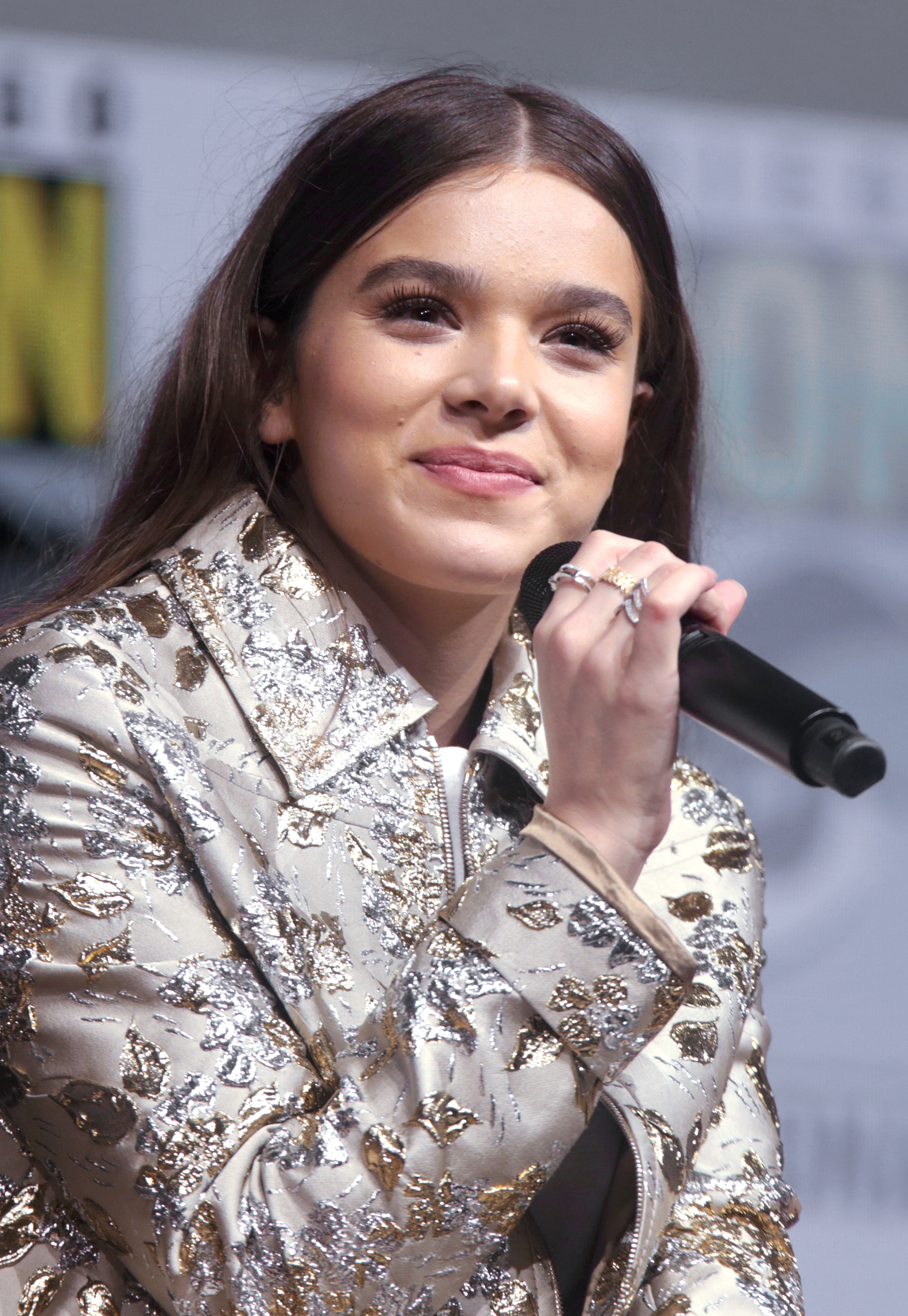
Hailee Steinfeld

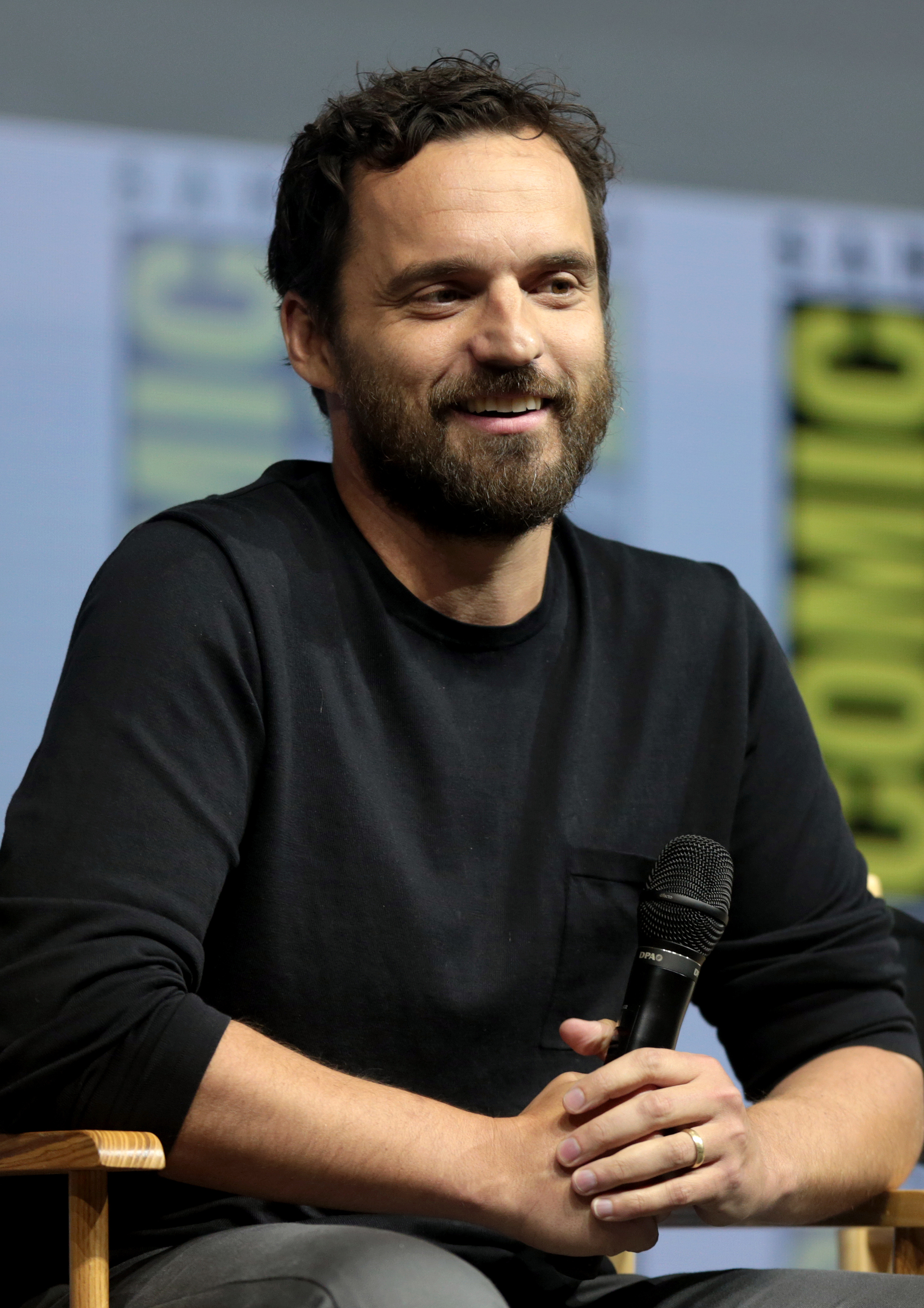
Jake Johnson

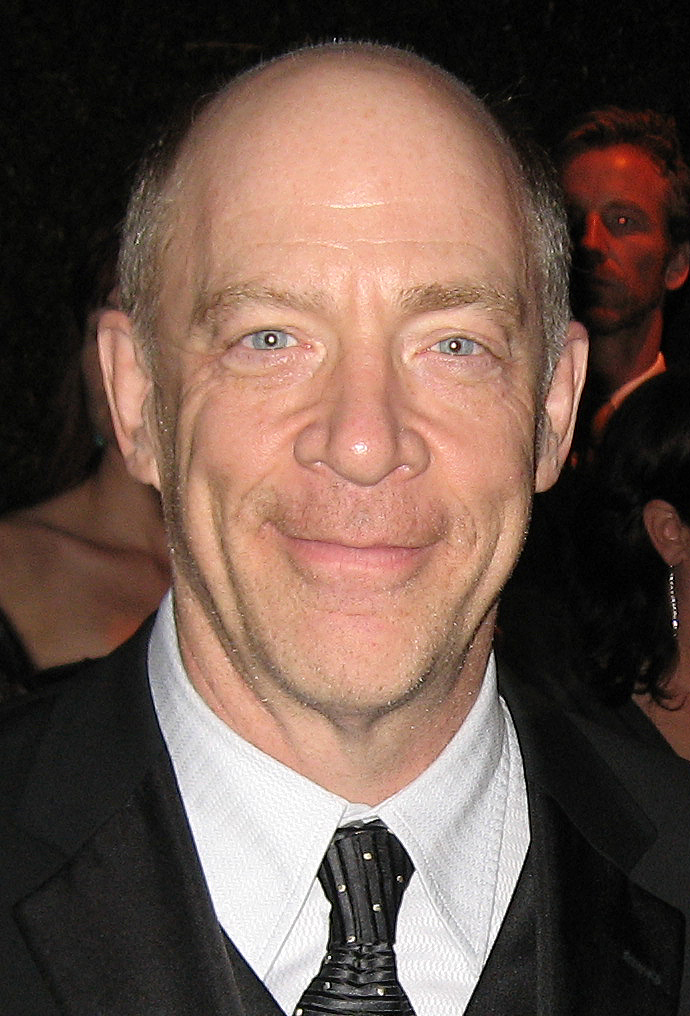
J. K. Simmons

Hammond portrays the first live-action film version of the character, appearing in a television series and three television films. Maguire and Garfield star in their own separate film series produced by Columbia Pictures, while Holland headlines the films co-produced by Columbia and Marvel Studios. Moore, Steinfeld and Johnson co-headline the Spider-Verse films. Simmons portrays various different versions of J. Jonah Jameson throughout the Spider-Man films.

The following is a list of cast members who portrayed or voiced characters appearing in the Spider-Man films produced primarily by Columbia Pictures and later co-produced by Marvel Studios and Sony Pictures Animation. The list is sorted by film and character, as some characters may have been portrayed by multiple actors.

Nicholas Hammond is the first live-action film portrayal of the character, starring in The Amazing Spider-Man television series and its made-for-television films Spider-Man (1977), Spider-Man Strikes Back (1978), and Spider-Man: The Dragon's Challenge (1981).

Tobey Maguire portrayed Peter Parker / Spider-Man in a trilogy of films produced by Columbia Pictures consisting of Spider-Man (2002), Spider-Man 2 (2004), and Spider-Man 3 (2007). A new iteration of the character was portrayed by Andrew Garfield in The Amazing Spider-Man (2012) and The Amazing Spider-Man 2 (2014).

Tom Holland portrays another iteration of the character set in the Marvel Cinematic Universe (MCU), headlining a trilogy co-produced by Columbia Pictures and Marvel Studios consisting of Spider-Man: Homecoming (2017), Spider-Man: Far From Home (2019), and Spider-Man: No Way Home (2021), the latter of which he is joined by Maguire and Garfield in supporting roles. Holland also appeared as the character in the MCU films Captain America: Civil War (2016), Avengers: Infinity War (2018), and Avengers: Endgame (2019), and had an uncredited cameo appearance in the Sony's Spider-Man Universe (SSU) film Venom: Let There Be Carnage (2021). Another iteration of the character is introduced in the SSU film Madame Web (2024).

Shameik Moore stars in the Sony Pictures Animation film Spider-Man: Into the Spider-Verse (2018) voicing Miles Morales / Spider-Man, with Hailee Steinfeld and Jake Johnson also featured as Gwen Stacy / Spider-Woman and Peter B. Parker / Spider-Man, respectively. All three actors reprise their roles in the sequels Spider-Man: Across the Spider-Verse (2023) and Spider-Man: Beyond the Spider-Verse (2027).

Several other cast members who recur in the film series and/or within the franchises include Willem Dafoe, Kirsten Dunst, James Franco, Rosemary Harris, Cliff Robertson, Alfred Molina, Thomas Haden Church, Emma Stone, Rhys Ifans, Sally Field, Jamie Foxx, Jon Favreau, Zendaya, Jacob Batalon, Tony Revolori, Marisa Tomei, Brian Tyree Henry, Lauren Vélez, Mahershala Ali, Oscar Isaac and Kimiko Glenn

== Feature-length live-action films ==
=== Early TV films ===
Character
Character	The Amazing Spider-Man (TV series)			Spider-Man (Japanese TV series)
Character	1977	1978	1981	1978
Character	Spider-Man	Spider-Man Strikes Back	Spider-Man: The Dragon's Challenge	Spider-Man
Spider-Man Peter Parker / Takuya Yamashiro	Nicholas Hammond	Nicholas Hammond	Nicholas Hammond	Shinji Todō
==== Introduced in Spider-Man (1977) ====
J. Jonah Jameson	David White	Robert F. Simon	Robert F. Simon	
May Parker	Jeff Donnell			
Robbie Robertson	Hilly Hicks			
==== Introduced in Spider-Man Strikes Back ====
Rita Conway		Chip Fields	Chip Fields	
==== Introduced in Spider-Man (1978) ====
Jūzō Mamiya				Noboru Nakaya
Sea-Devil				N/A
Shinko Yamashiro				Izumi Ōyama
Takuji Yamashiro				Yoshiharu Yabuki

=== Sony Pictures–produced films ===
==== The Sam Raimi trilogy (2002–2007) ====
List indicators

This section includes characters who have appeared in noteworthy roles.

- An empty grey cell indicates the character was not in the film.
- ^{A} indicates an appearance through archival footage or audio.
- ^{C} indicates a cameo role.

Character
Character	2002	2004	2007
Character	Spider-Man	Spider-Man 2	Spider-Man 3
Peter Parker Spider-Man	Tobey Maguire	Tobey Maguire	Tobey Maguire
===== Introduced in Spider-Man (2002) =====
Henry Balkan	Jack Betts		
Bonesaw McGraw	Randy Savage		
Betty Brant	Elizabeth Banks	Elizabeth Banks	Elizabeth Banks
Dennis Carradine	Michael Papajohn		Michael Papajohn^{C}
Maximilian Fargas	Gerry Becker		
Ted Hoffman	Ted Raimi	Ted Raimi	Ted Raimi
Bernard Houseman	John Paxton	John Paxton	John Paxton
J. Jonah Jameson	J. K. Simmons	J. K. Simmons	J. K. Simmons
Harry Osborn New Goblin	James Franco	James Franco	James Franco
Norman Osborn Green Goblin	Willem Dafoe	Willem Dafoe	Willem Dafoe
Ben Parker	Cliff Robertson	Cliff Robertson	Cliff Robertson
May Parker	Rosemary Harris	Rosemary Harris	Rosemary Harris
Robbie Robertson	Bill Nunn	Bill Nunn	Bill Nunn
General Slocum	Stanley Anderson		
Mendel Stromm	Ron Perkins		
Eugene "Flash" Thompson	Joe Manganiello		Joe Manganiello^{C}
Mary Jane Watson	Kirsten Dunst	Kirsten Dunst	Kirsten Dunst
===== Introduced in Spider-Man 2 =====
Mr. Aziz		Aasif Mandvi	
Curt Connors		Dylan Baker	Dylan Baker
Mr. Ditkovitch		Elya Baskin	Elya Baskin
Ursula Ditkovitch		Mageina Tovah	Mageina Tovah
John Jameson		Daniel Gillies	
Otto Octavius Doctor Octopus / "Doc Ock"		Alfred Molina	Alfred Molina^{A}
Rosalie Octavius		Donna Murphy	
===== Introduced in Spider-Man 3 =====
Eddie Brock, Jr. Venom			Topher Grace
Emma Marko			Theresa Russell
Flint Marko Sandman			Thomas Haden Church
Penny Marko			Perla Haney-Jardine
Mrs. Stacy			Becky Ann Baker^{C}
George Stacy			James Cromwell
Gwen Stacy			Bryce Dallas Howard

==== The Amazing Spider-Man films (2012–2014) ====
List indicators

This section includes characters who have appeared in noteworthy roles.

- An empty grey cell indicates the character was not in the film.
- ^{C} indicates a cameo role.
- ^{E} indicates an appearance not included in the theatrical cut.
- ^{Y} indicates a younger version of the character.

Character
Character	2012	2014
Character	The Amazing Spider-Man	The Amazing Spider-Man 2
Peter Parker Spider-Man	Andrew Garfield; Max Charles^{Y}	Andrew Garfield; Max Charles^{Y}
===== Introduced in The Amazing Spider-Man =====
Sally Avril	Kelsey Asbille^{C}	
Curt Connors The Lizard	Rhys Ifans	
Gustav Fiers	Michael Massee^{C}	Michael Massee
Ben Parker	Martin Sheen	
Mary Parker	Embeth Davidtz	Embeth Davidtz
May Parker	Sally Field	Sally Field
Richard Parker	Campbell Scott	Campbell Scott
Rajit Ratha	Irrfan Khan	
George Stacy	Denis Leary	Denis Leary^{C}
Gwen Stacy	Emma Stone	Emma Stone
Eugene "Flash" Thompson	Chris Zylka	Chris Zylka^{E}
===== Introduced in The Amazing Spider-Man 2 =====
Max Dillon Electro		Jamie Foxx
Felicia Hardy		Felicity Jones
Ashley Kafka		Marton Csokas
Donald Menken		Colm Feore
Harry Osborn Green Goblin		Dane DeHaan
Norman Osborn		Chris Cooper^{C}
Alistair Smythe		B. J. Novak
Aleksei Sytsevich Rhino		Paul Giamatti

==== Sony's Spider-Man Universe (2018–2024) ====
List indicators

This section includes characters who will appear or have appeared in the Sony's Spider-Man Universe films.

- An empty grey cell indicates the character was not in the film, or that the character's official presence has not yet been confirmed.
- ^{C} indicates a cameo role.
- ^{E} indicates an appearance not included in the theatrical cut.
- ^{V} indicates a voice-only role.
- ^{Y} indicates a younger version of the character.

Character
Character	2018	2021	2022	2024		
Character	Venom	Venom: Let There Be Carnage	Morbius	Madame Web	Venom: The Last Dance	Kraven the Hunter
===== Introduced in the Marvel Cinematic Universe =====
Bartender					Cristo Fernández	
J. Jonah Jameson		J. K. Simmons^{U}^{C}^{U}				
Peter Parker Spider-Man	Tom Holland^{E}	Tom Holland^{U}^{C}^{U}				
Adrian Toomes Vulture			Michael Keaton^{U}^{C}			
===== Introduced in Venom =====
Eddie Brock	Tom Hardy	Tom Hardy			Tom Hardy	
Mrs. Chen	Peggy Lu	Peggy Lu			Peggy Lu	
Carlton Drake	Riz Ahmed				Riz Ahmed^{A}	
John Jameson	Chris O'Hara					
Cletus Kasady	Woody Harrelson^{C}	Woody Harrelson; Jack Bandeira^{Y}			Woody Harrelson^{A}	
Dan Lewis	Reid Scott	Reid Scott			Reid Scott^{E}	
Riot	Riz Ahmed^{V}					
Dora Skirth	Jenny Slate					
Roland Treece	Scott Haze					
Venom	Tom Hardy^{V} Brad Venable^{V}	Tom Hardy^{V}			Tom Hardy^{V}	
Anne Weying	Michelle Williams	Michelle Williams				
===== Introduced in Venom: Let There Be Carnage =====
Frances Barrison Shriek		Naomie Harris; Olumide Olorunfemi^{Y}				
Carnage		Woody Harrelson^{V}				
Patrick Mulligan		Stephen Graham; Sean Delaney^{Y}			Stephen Graham	
===== Introduced in Morbius =====
Martine Bancroft			Adria Arjona			
Michael Morbius			Jared Leto; Charlie Shotwell^{Y}			
Lucien / Milo			Matt Smith; Joseph Esson^{Y}			
Emil Nicholas			Jared Harris			
Alberto Rodriguez			Al Madrigal			
Simon Stroud			Tyrese Gibson			
===== Introduced in Madame Web =====
Anya Corazon				Isabela Merced		
Julia Cornwall				Sydney Sweeney		
Mattie Franklin				Celeste O'Connor		
Ben Parker				Adam Scott		
Mary Parker				Emma Roberts		
Peter Parker				Uncredited infant^{C}		
Ezekiel Sims				Tahar Rahim		
Cassandra Webb Madame Web				Dakota Johnson		
===== Introduced in Venom: The Last Dance =====
Agony					Juno Temple^{V}	
Bartender					Cristo Fernández	
Dr. Sadie Christmas					Clark Backo	
Head of Imperium					Reid Scott^{V}	
Knull					Andy Serkis	
Lasher					Clark Backo^{V}	
Martin Moon					Rhys Ifans	
Nova Moon					Alanna Ubach	
Dr. Teddy Payne					Juno Temple	
Rex Strickland					Chiwetel Ejiofor	
===== Introduced in Kraven the Hunter =====
Calypso						Ariana DeBose; Diaana Babnicova^{Y}
Foreigner						Christopher Abbott
Nikolai Kravinoff						Russell Crowe
Sergei Kravinoff Kraven						Aaron Taylor-Johnson; Levi Miller^{Y}
Dmitri Smerdyakov Chameleon						Fred Hechinger; Billy Barratt^{Y}
Aleksei Sytsevich Rhino						Alessandro Nivola

=== Licensing agreement with Marvel Studios ===
==== Marvel Cinematic Universe films (2016–present) ====
List indicators

This section includes characters who will appear or have appeared in the MCU films.

- An empty grey cell indicates the character was not in the film, or that the character's official presence has not yet been confirmed.
- ^{A} indicates an appearance through archival footage or audio.
- ^{C} indicates a cameo role.
- ^{MC} indicates a motion-capture-only role.
- ^{P} indicates an appearance in onscreen photographs.
- ^{U} indicates an uncredited appearance.
- ^{V} indicates a voice-only role.

Character
Character	Phase Three		Phase Four	Phase Six
Character	2017	2019	2021	2026
Character	Spider-Man: Homecoming	Spider-Man: Far From Home	Spider-Man: No Way Home	Spider-Man: Brand New Day
Peter Parker Spider-Man	Tom Holland	Tom Holland	Tom Holland	Tom Holland
===== Introduced in the Marvel Cinematic Universe =====
Bruce Banner Hulk				Mark Ruffalo
Yelena Belova				Florence Pugh
Frank Castle The Punisher				Jon Bernthal
F.R.I.D.A.Y.	Kerry Condon^{V}			
Nick Fury		Samuel L. Jackson^{C}		
Roger Harrington	Martin Starr	Martin Starr	Martin Starr^{C}	Martin Starr^{P}
Harold "Happy" Hogan	Jon Favreau	Jon Favreau	Jon Favreau	
Pat Kiernan		Himself	Himself	Himself
Matt Murdock Daredevil			Charlie Cox^{C}	
May Parker	Marisa Tomei	Marisa Tomei	Marisa Tomei	Marisa Tomei
Virginia "Pepper" Potts	Gwyneth Paltrow			
William Ginter Riva		Peter Billingsley		
Sheila Rivera				Zabryna Guevara
Steve Rogers Captain America	Chris Evans	Chris Evans^{A}^{P}		
Soren Maria Hill		Cobie Smulders Sharon Blynn^{U}^{C}		
Obadiah Stane		Jeff Bridges^{A}		
Tony Stark Iron Man	Robert Downey Jr.	Robert Downey Jr.^{A}		
Stephen Strange			Benedict Cumberbatch	
Talos Nick Fury		Samuel L. Jackson Ben Mendelsohn^{U}^{C}		
Wong			Benedict Wong	
===== Introduced in the Sony–produced films =====
Eddie Brock Venom			Tom Hardy^{U}	
Flint Marko Sandman			Thomas Haden Church^{V} Jon Watts^{MC}	
Peter Parker Spider-Man / "Peter-Three"			Andrew Garfield	
Peter Parker Spider-Man / "Peter-Two"			Tobey Maguire	
===== Introduced in Spider-Man: Homecoming =====
Sally Avril	Isabella Amara			
Betty Brant	Angourie Rice	Angourie Rice	Angourie Rice	
Jackson Brice Shocker	Logan Marshall-Green			
Aaron Davis	Donald Glover			
Mac Gargan Scorpion	Michael Mando			Michael Mando
Anne Marie Hoag	Tyne Daly			
Karen	Jennifer Connelly^{V}			
Ned Leeds	Jacob Batalon	Jacob Batalon	Jacob Batalon	Jacob Batalon
Phineas Mason	Michael Chernus			
Cindy Moon	Tiffany Espensen			
Herman Schultz Shocker II	Bokeem Woodbine			
Flash Thompson	Tony Revolori	Tony Revolori	Tony Revolori	Tony Revolori^{P}
Adrian Toomes Vulture	Michael Keaton			
Doris Toomes	Garcelle Beauvais			
Liz Allan-Toomes	Laura Harrier		Laura Harrier^{P}	
Michelle Jones-Watson	Zendaya	Zendaya	Zendaya	Zendaya
Coach Wilson	Hannibal Buress		Hannibal Buress^{C}	
===== Introduced in Spider-Man: Far From Home =====
Quentin Beck Mysterio		Jake Gyllenhaal	Jake Gyllenhaal^{A}	
Brad Davis		Remy Hii		
Julius Dell		J. B. Smoove	J. B. Smoove^{C}	
Dimitri		Numan Acar		
E.D.I.T.H.		Dawn Michelle King^{V}	Dawn Michelle King^{A}^{V}	
J. Jonah Jameson		J. K. Simmons^{U}^{C}	J. K. Simmons	
Janice Lincoln		Claire Rushbrook		
===== Introduced in Spider-Man: No Way Home =====
Bartender			Cristo Fernández^{U}	
P. Cleary			Arian Moayed	
Curt Connors The Lizard (Note: This is a variant of the character that is seen in The Amazing Spider-Man films.)			Rhys Ifans^{V}	
Max Dillon Electro			Jamie Foxx	
Otto Octavius Doctor Octopus / "Doc Ock" (Note: This is a variant of the character that is seen in Sam Raimi's Spider-Man trilogy.)			Alfred Molina	
Norman Osborn Green Goblin			Willem Dafoe	
===== Introduced in Spider-Man: Brand New Day =====
Boomerang				Aidan Kennedy
Jean DeWolff				Liza Colón-Zayas
E.V.				Naomi Watts
Jean Grey				Sadie Sink
Leader of the Hand				Fan Xiaoshuang
Lonnie Lincoln Tombstone				Marvin Jones III
Bill Metzger				Tramell Tillman
Ramrod				Billy Clements

== Feature-length animated films ==
=== Sony Pictures–produced animated films ===
==== Spider-Verse films (2018–present) ====
Character
Character	2018	2023	2027
Character	Spider-Man: Into the Spider-Verse	Spider-Man: Across the Spider-Verse	Spider-Man: Beyond the Spider-Verse
Miles Morales Spider-Man	Shameik Moore	Shameik Moore	Shameik Moore
===== Introduced in Spider-Man: Into the Spider-Verse =====
Vanessa Fisk	Lake Bell		
Wilson Fisk Kingpin	Liev Schreiber	No voice actor	
Aaron Davis Prowler	Mahershala Ali	Mahershala Ali	
Jefferson Davis	Brian Tyree Henry	Brian Tyree Henry	
Rio Morales	Luna Lauren Vélez	Luna Lauren Vélez	
Miguel O'Hara Spider-Man 2099	Oscar Isaac^{C}	Oscar Isaac	Oscar Isaac
Olivia Octavius Doctor Octopus	Kathryn Hahn	Kathryn Hahn^{A}	
Norman Osborn Green Goblin	Jorma Taccone		
Mary Jane Parker	Zoë Kravitz		
May Parker	Lily Tomlin	Elizabeth Perkins	
Peni Parker / SP//dr	Kimiko Glenn	Kimiko Glenn	
Peter Parker Spider-Man	Chris Pine		
Peter B. Parker Spider-Man	Jake Johnson	Jake Johnson	Jake Johnson
Peter Parker Spider-Man Noir	Nicolas Cage	Nicolas Cage^{A}	
Peter Porker Spider-Ham	John Mulaney	John Mulaney^{A}	
Scorpion	Joaquín Cosío		
Gwen Stacy Spider-Woman	Hailee Steinfeld	Hailee Steinfeld	Hailee Steinfeld
Tombstone	Marvin Jones III		
===== Introduced in Spider-Man: Across the Spider-Verse =====
Hobie Brown Spider-Punk		Daniel Kaluuya	Daniel Kaluuya
Jessica Drew Spider-Woman		Issa Rae	Issa Rae
Ganke	No voice actor	Peter Sohn	
Miles G. Morales Prowler		Jharrel Jerome	Jharrel Jerome
Johnathan Ohn Spot	No voice actor	Jason Schwartzman	Jason Schwartzman
Pavitr Prabhakar Spider-Man Mumbattan		Karan Soni	Karan Soni
George Stacy	No voice actor	Shea Whigham	
Adrian Toomes Vulture		Jorma Taccone	
===== Introduced in other–Spider-Man media =====
Mrs. Chen		Peggy Lu	
Aaron Davis Prowler		Donald Glover	
J. Jonah Jameson (Earth-67) (Note: First appeared in the 1967 Spider-Man series (Earth-67).)	Adam Brown^{U}^{C}		
Ben Parker	Cliff Robertson^{A}	Cliff Robertson^{A}	
Peter Parker Insomniac Spider-Man		Yuri Lowenthal^{C}	
Peter Parker Spectacular Spider-Man		Josh Keaton^{C}	
Peter Parker Spider-Man		Andrew Garfield^{A}	
Peter Parker Spider-Man		Tobey Maguire^{A}	
Peter Parker Spider-Man (Earth-67)	Jorma Taccone^{U}^{C}	Jorma Taccone^{C}	
George Stacy		Denis Leary^{A}	
Mary Jane Watson		Kirsten Dunst^{A}	

== See also ==
- Spider-Man in other media
- Marvel Cinematic Universe cast members
  - Marvel Cinematic Universe film actors (The Infinity Saga)
  - Marvel Cinematic Universe film actors
- X-Men film series cast members
