= Lists of Marvel Cinematic Universe cast members =

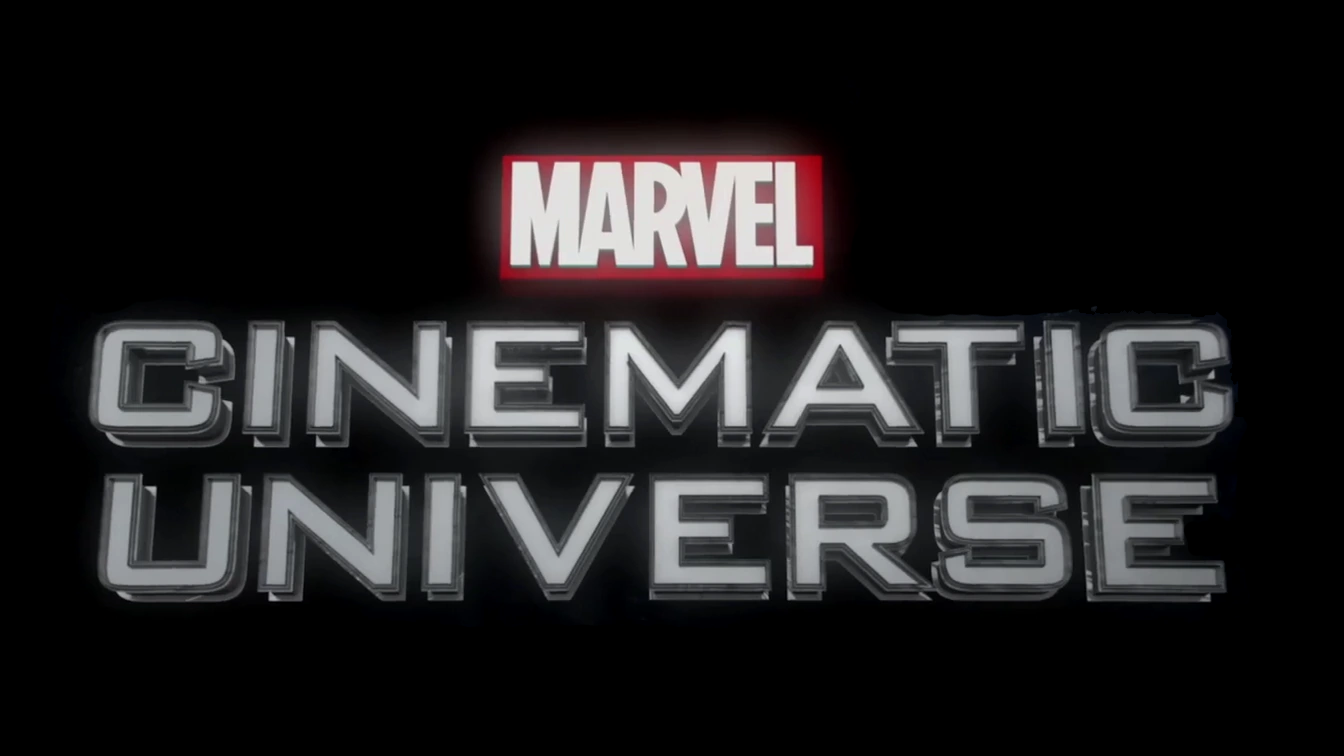

Lists of Marvel Cinematic Universe cast members cover cast members of productions from the Marvel Cinematic Universe (MCU), an American media franchise centered on a series of superhero films. The lists include cast members of feature films, short films, and television and digital series.

== Feature films ==
- Film actors, cast and characters that have appeared in the Marvel Cinematic Universe films
  - The Infinity Saga cast members, cast and characters that have appeared in the Infinity Saga

== Short films ==
- One-Shots cast and characters, cast and characters that have appeared in the Marvel One-Shots short films
- Team Thor cast and characters, cast and characters that have appeared in the Team Thor short films

== Television ==
- Marvel Television series actors, cast and characters that have appeared in Marvel Television's MCU television series
  - Agents of S.H.I.E.L.D. cast and characters
  - Agent Carter cast and characters
  - Inhumans cast and characters
  - Daredevil cast and characters
  - Jessica Jones cast and characters
  - Luke Cage cast and characters
  - Iron Fist cast and characters
  - The Defenders cast and characters
  - The Punisher cast and characters
  - Runaways cast and characters
  - Cloak & Dagger cast and characters
  - Helstrom cast and characters
- Marvel Studios television series actors, cast and characters that have appeared in Marvel Studios' MCU television series and specials
  - WandaVision cast and characters
  - The Falcon and the Winter Soldier cast and characters
  - Loki cast and characters
  - What If...? cast and characters
  - Hawkeye cast and characters
  - Moon Knight cast and characters
  - Ms. Marvel cast and characters
  - She-Hulk: Attorney at Law cast and characters
  - Werewolf by Night cast and characters
  - The Guardians of the Galaxy Holiday Special cast and characters
  - Secret Invasion cast and characters
  - Echo cast and characters
  - Agatha All Along cast and characters
- For unproduced television series, see:
  - Marvel's Most Wanted cast and characters, cast and characters that would have appeared on the Marvel's Most Wanted pilot
  - New Warriors cast and characters, cast and characters that would have appeared on the New Warriors pilot

== Digital series ==
- WHIH Newsfront cast and characters, cast and characters that have appeared on the viral marketing WHIH Newsfront digital series
- Agents of S.H.I.E.L.D.: Slingshot cast and characters, cast and characters that have appeared on the Agents of S.H.I.E.L.D.: Slingshot digital series
- The Daily Bugle cast and characters, cast and characters that have appeared on the viral marketing The Daily Bugle digital series

== See also ==
- Characters of the Marvel Cinematic Universe
- Spider-Man film cast members
- X-Men film series cast members
