= The Famous Five (2023 TV series) =

British Television series

- Created by: Nicolas Winding Refn
- Based on: The Famous Five by Enid Blyton
- Screenplay by: Mathew Read; Priya K. Dosanjh; Mathew Bound; Guy Andrews
- Directed by: Tim Kirkby; Asim Abbasi; Bill Eagles
- Starring: Diaana Babnicova; Elliott Rose; Kit Rakusen; Flora Jacoby Richardson; Jack Gleeson; James Lance; Ann Akinjirin; Diana Quick; Ed Speleers; Nora Arnezeder; Jason Flemyng; Art Malik
- Opening theme: Hidden Treasures by The Beyond
- Countries of origin: United Kingdom; Germany
- Original language: English
- No. of series: 2
- No. of episodes: 5

Production
- Executive producers: Tim Kirkby; Nicolas Winding Refn; Matthew Read; Will Gould; Frith Tiplady; Christina Bostofte Erritzøe; Kimberly Willming; Matthew Bouch
- Producer: Sophie MacClancy
- Production companies: byNWR; Moonage Pictures; ZDF Studios; BBC Studios Kids & Family

Original release
- Network: CBBC; KiKA
- Release: 9 December 2023 – 7 December 2025

The Famous Five is a British television series, an adaptation of the Enid Blyton series of books of the same name for the BBC and ZDF by Nicolas Winding Refn.

== Cast ==
=== Main and recurring ===
- Diaana Babnicova as George
- Elliott Rose as Julian
- Kit Rakusen as Dick
- Flora Jacoby Richardson as Anne
- James Lance as Quentin, George's father
- Ann Akinjirin as Fanny, George’s mother
- Kip as Timmy the Dog

=== Guest ===
- Jack Gleeson as Thomas Wentworth (Episode 1, 3 & 4)
- Diana Quick as Mrs. Wentworth (Episode 1)
- Ed Speleers as Mr. Roland (Episode 2)
- Nora Arnezeder as Sabrina Grover (Episode 2)
- Jason Flemyng as circus magician the Great Supremo (Episode 3)
- Art Malik as Sir Lincoln Aubrey (Episode 3)
- Emma Paetz as Dr. Graves (Episode 3)
- Amir Wilson as Charlie Vincent / Cab Vee (Episode 4)
- James Wilby as Mr Vincent (Episode 4)
- Rita Tushingham as Miss Clutterbuck (Episode 4)
- Jemima Rooper as Angela Clutterbuck (Episode 4)
- Tilly Walker as Jo (episode 3)
- Jonathan Aris as Mr Standing (Episode 4)
- Jamie Andrew Cutler as Mr Crawford (Episode 4)
- Chloe Acland as Dilys (Episode 4)
- María Pedraza as Gabriela (Episode 4)
- Gemma Whelan as Gertrude Drachmann (Episode 5)
- Joshua McGuire as Harry Maddox (Episode 5)
- Gracie Hodson-Prior as Mona (Episode 5)
- Pixie Davies as Emily Hatcher (Episode 5)
- Tom Byrne as Sidney Hamilton (Episode 5)

== Production ==
The news was broken in June 2023 that a reimagined adaptation of the classic Enid Blyton children’s book series The Famous Five for the BBC and ZDF was taking place by Nicolas Winding Refn as creator and executive producer. Episode one was announced to be written by Matthew Read, with Episode 2 written by Priya K. Dosanjh and Episode 3 written by Matthew Bouch and Read. Other executive producers include Read and Bouch, Will Gould, Frith Tiplady, Christina Bostofte Erritzøe, and Kimberly Willming. The series Producer is Sophie MacClancy.

The series is set to be three 90-minute episodes. Tim Kirkby is a director of one of the episodes and executive producer on the project. Other directors to helm an episode are Asim Abbasi and Bill Eagles. The project is executive produced by Refn for byNWR and Matthew Read for Moonage Pictures, in co-production with ZDF.

It was announced in September 2024 that filming was underway for a second series of two additional 90 minute episodes.

=== Casting ===
The main cast were revealed in July 2023. The Five would be played by Diaana Babnicova, Elliott Rose, Kit Rakusen and Flora Jacoby Richardson, completed by a Bearded Collie cross named Kip. Jack Gleeson was cast as Thomas Wentworth, Ann Akinjirin and James Lance were cast as parents of George, and Diana Quick was cast as Mrs. Wentworth.

In February 2024, it was announced that Ed Speleers and Nora Arnezeder were cast as Mr. Roland and Sabrina Grover for Episode 2 and Jason Flemyng and Art Malik were cast as circus magician the Great Supremo and Sir Lincoln Aubrey for Episode 3.

Jemima Rooper, who played George in the 1995 television series, guest starred as Angela Clutterbuck in episode 4.

=== Filming ===
Filming started in June 2023 with locations across the South West of England. Principal photography took place in July 2023 in Cornwall, North Somerset, Gloucestershire and Monmouthshire, with filming locations including Port Isaac, Port Gaverne, Tyntesfield and Gloucester Cathedral.

== Broadcast ==
The first episode was shown in the UK on CBBC and BBC iPlayer from 9 December 2023, with the second episode debuting on 29 March 2024. The third episode was made available on 25 May 2024.

In the US, the episodes became available on Hulu from 31 May 2024. The series was then made available on BYUtv in April 2026.

== Episodes ==
=== Series 1 (2023–2024) ===
| No. overall | No. in season | Title | Directed by | Written by | Original release date |
|---|---|---|---|---|---|
| 1 | 1 | "The Curse of Kirrin Island" | Tim Kirkby | Matthew Read | 9 December 2023 |
| 2 | 2 | "Peril on the Night Train" | Asim Abbasi | Priya K. Dosanjh | 29 March 2024 |
| 3 | 3 | "The Eye of the Sunrise" | Bill Eagles | Matthew Read and Matthew Bouch | 25 May 2024 |

=== Series 2 (2024–2025) ===
| No. overall | No. in season | Title | Directed by | Written by | Original release date |
|---|---|---|---|---|---|
| 4 | 1 | "Mystery at the Prospect Hotel" | Asim Abbasi | Guy Andrews | 23 December 2024 |
| 5 | 2 | "Big Trouble on Billycock Hill" | Tom Vaughan | Tom Bidwell | 7 December 2025 |
