= Diaana Babnicova =

British actress (born 2009)

- Born: 2009 (age 16–17)
- Occupation: Actress
- Years active: 2019–present

Diaana Babnicova (born 2009) is a British child actress. She began her career on the West End. On television, she is known for her roles in the Sky Kids series Little Darlings (2022) and the CBBC series The Famous Five (2023). Her films include Don't Breathe 2 (2021), Possum Trot (2024) and Kraven the Hunter (2024).

== Early life and education ==
Babnicova was born to Ghanaian mother Sandra Frimpong and Slovak father Juraj Babnič. She has an older brother Denis. At age 10, Babnicova earned a scholarship to the Sylvia Young Theatre School. She previously trained at London Arts Academy (LAA).

== Career ==
Babnicova made her professional stage debut alternating the role of Shonelle in the West End production of Andrew Lloyd Webber's School of Rock at the Gillian Lynne Theatre. That same year, she appeared in the music video for George Ezra's "Pretty Shining People". This was followed by her feature film debut the next year in the Netflix film Jingle Jangle: A Christmas Journey as a young version of Anika Noni Rose's character. Babnicova then played Billie in the 2021 horror sequel Don't Breathe 2.

In 2022, Babnicova made her television debut as the lead character Sunset in the Sky Kids adaptation of Little Darlings and its companion series On Tour: Little Darlings. She also contributed to the Little Darlings soundtrack. She starred as George Barnard in the 2023 CBBC adaptation of The Famous Five. She then played Terri in Sound of Hope: The Story of Possum Trot, a film about foster care.

In 2026, Babnicova was announced to be a part of Disney's ZOMBIES 5, in which she is cast as 'Pearl'.

== Filmography ==
Key
†	Denotes works that have not yet been released

=== Film ===
Year	Title	Role	Notes
2019	Better		Short film
2020	Jingle Jangle: A Christmas Journey	Young Jessica	Netflix film
2021	Don't Breathe 2	Billie	
2021	Swipe Right	Daughter	Short film
2024	Sound of Hope: The Story of Possum Trot	Terri	
2024	Kraven the Hunter	Young Calypso Ezili	
2027	Children of Blood and Bone †	Folake	Post-production
2027	Zombies 5 †	Pearl	

=== Television ===
Year	Title	Role	Notes
2020	Isolation the Series		Web, 2 episodes
2022	Little Darlings	Sunset	Main role
2022	On Tour: Little Darlings	Sunset	Main role
2023–2024	The Famous Five	George Barnard	Main role

=== Music videos ===
- "Pretty Shining People" (2019), George Ezra
