= Sound of Hope: The Story of Possum Trot =

- Theatrical release poster
- Directed by: Joshua Weigel
- Written by: Joshua Weigel; Rebekah Weigel
- Produced by: Joshua Weigel; Rebekah Weigel
- Starring: Elizabeth Mitchell; Demetrius Grosse; Nika King
- Cinematography: Benji Bakshi; Sean Patrick Kirby
- Edited by: David Andalman
- Music by: Sean Johnson
- Production company: Peacetree Productions
- Distributed by: Angel Studios
- Release date: July 4, 2024
- Running time: 129 minutes
- Country: United States
- Language: English
- Budget: $8.5 million
- Box office: $11.7 million

Sound of Hope: The Story of Possum Trot (also simply known as Possum Trot) is a 2024 American drama film directed by Joshua Weigel, and co-written by Rebekah Weigel. Actress and activist Letitia Wright served as executive producer. The film was produced by Peacetree Productions and distributed by Angel Studios. This is a biographical film about Donna and Reverend Martin.

== Plot ==
After her mother's death in 1996, Donna felt a calling to care for children without parents. After contacting an adoption agency, she learned about the plight of many other children. Along with her husband, Reverend Martin, and the Bennett Chapel Missionary Baptist Church in Possum Trot, Texas, she invited families to adopt children from the local foster system.

== Cast ==
- Elizabeth Mitchell as Susan Ramsey
- Demetrius Grosse as Reverend Martin
- Nika King as Donna Martin
- Joshua Weigel as Pastor Mark
- Diaana Babnicova as Terri

== Production ==
Filming took place in Macon, Georgia in the fall of 2022, with a budget of $8.5 million. In February 2024, it was announced that Angel Studios acquired North American distribution rights to the film.

== Release ==
The film had an early release in theaters exclusively on June 19, 2024, followed by a full theatrical release on July 4, 2024. In June 2024, Angel Studios announced they had entered into a marketing partnership with the conservative media company The Daily Wire, co-founded by podcaster and author Ben Shapiro. In a statement on Instagram, Letitia Wright distanced herself from The Daily Wire saying it wasn't her decision to partner with the company.

== Reception ==
=== Box office ===
In the United States and Canada, Sound of Hope: The Story of Possum Trot was released alongside Despicable Me 4 and was projected to gross $4–6 million from 2,250 theaters in its opening weekend. It made $3.1 million on its first weekend.

=== Critical response ===
On the review aggregator website Rotten Tomatoes, 83% of 42 critics' reviews are positive, with an average rating of 6.9/10. The website's consensus reads: "Sound of Hope: The Story of Possum Trot is an inspiring true tale in which the pure goodness of heart prevails." Audiences polled by CinemaScore gave the film a rare average grade of "A+" on an A+ to F scale, while those polled by PostTrak gave the film a 94% positive score, with 87% saying they would definitely recommend it.
