= List of X-Men film series cast members =

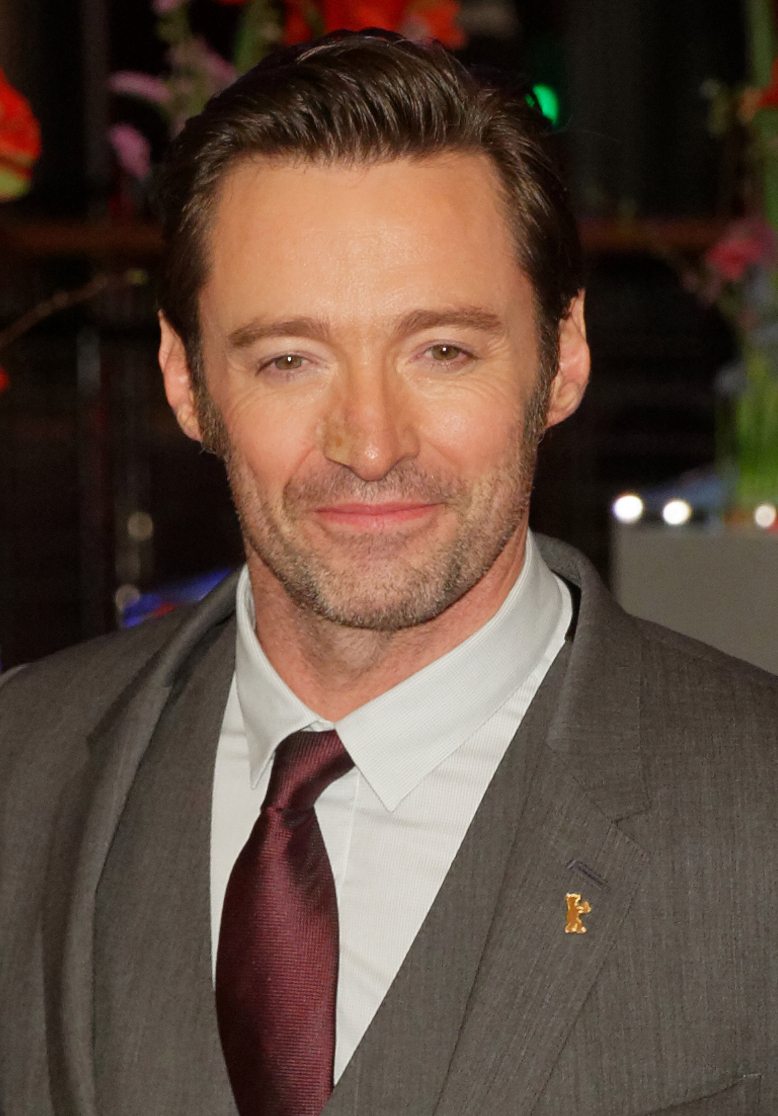
Hugh Jackman

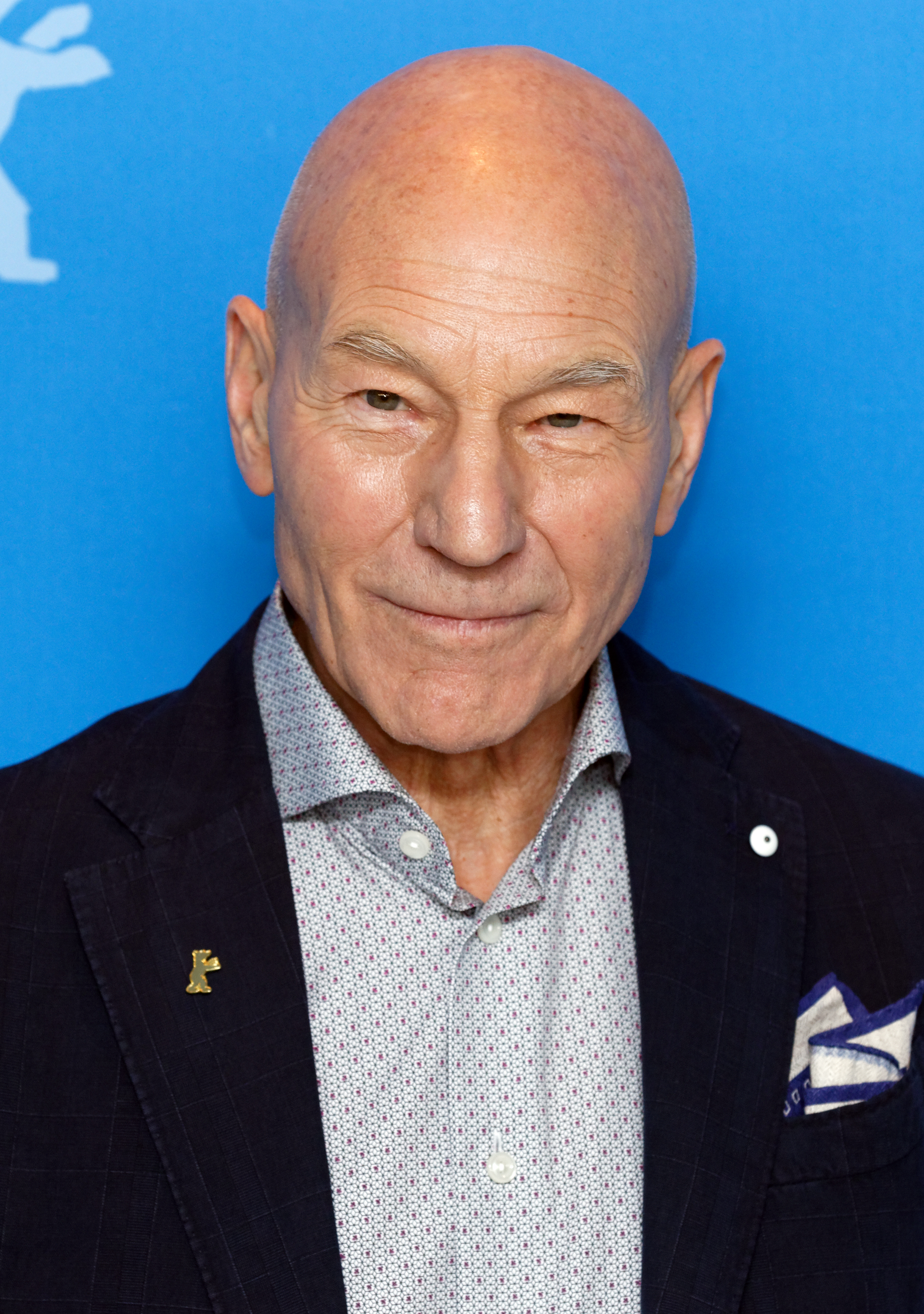
Patrick Stewart

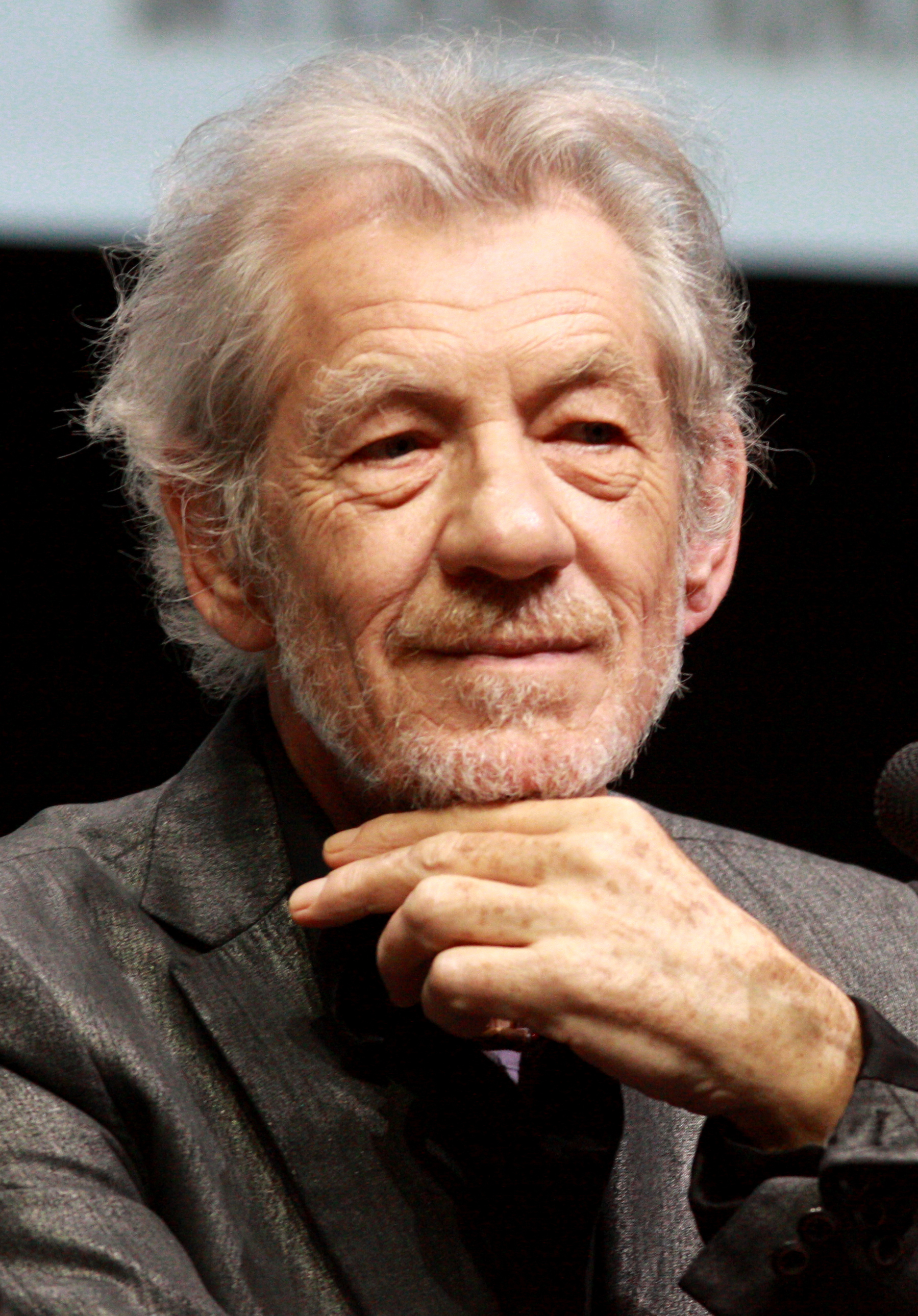
Ian McKellen

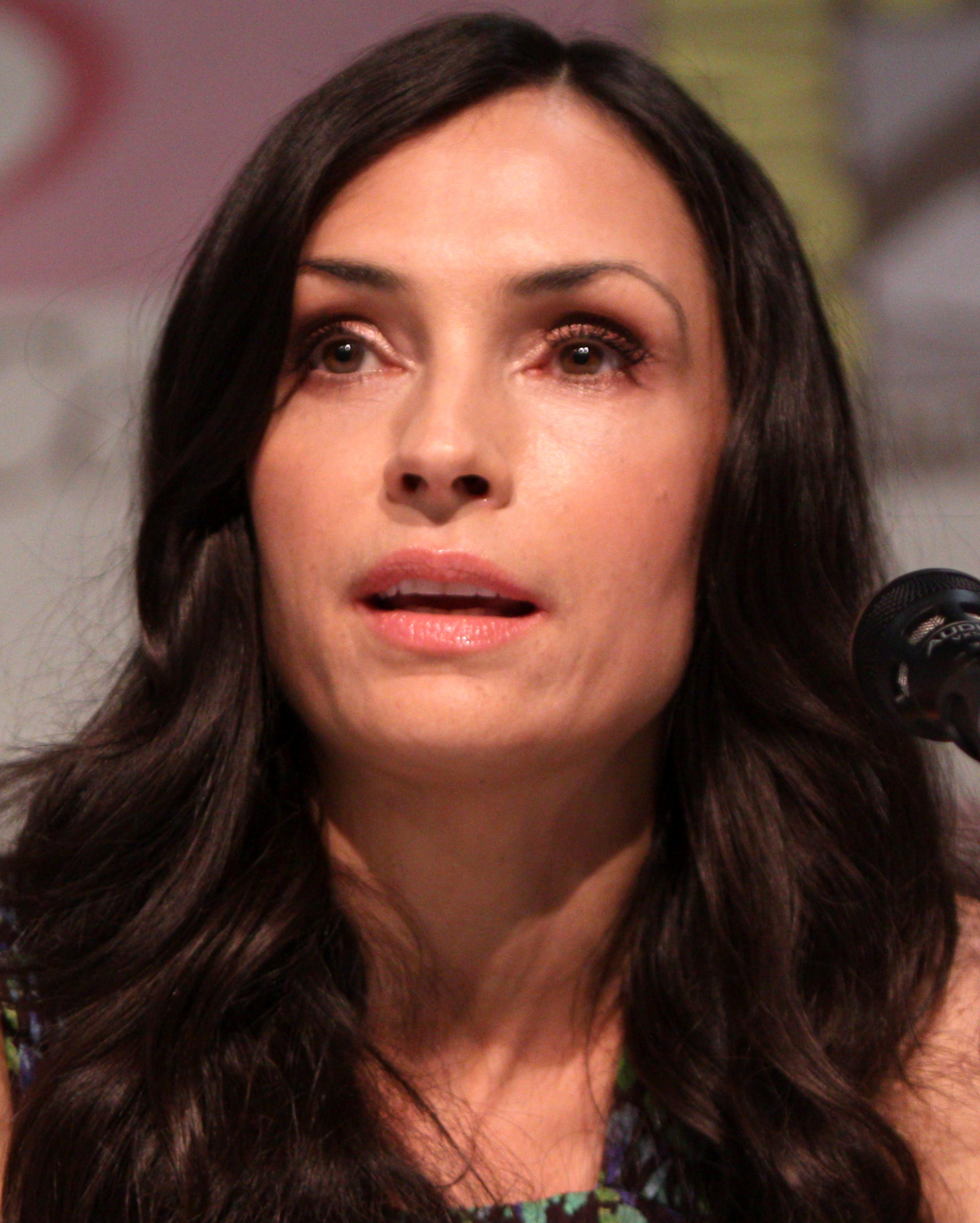
Famke Janssen

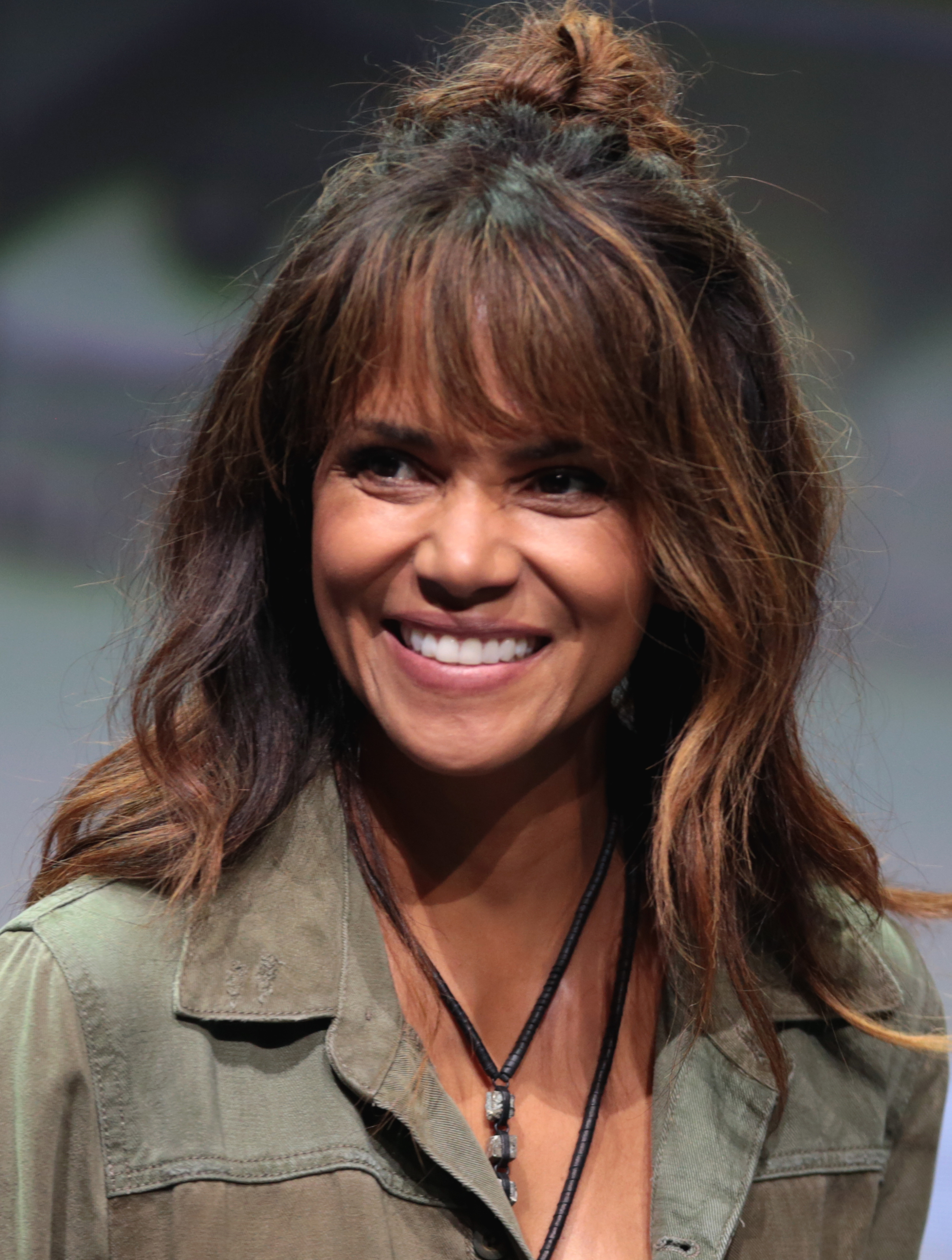
Halle Berry

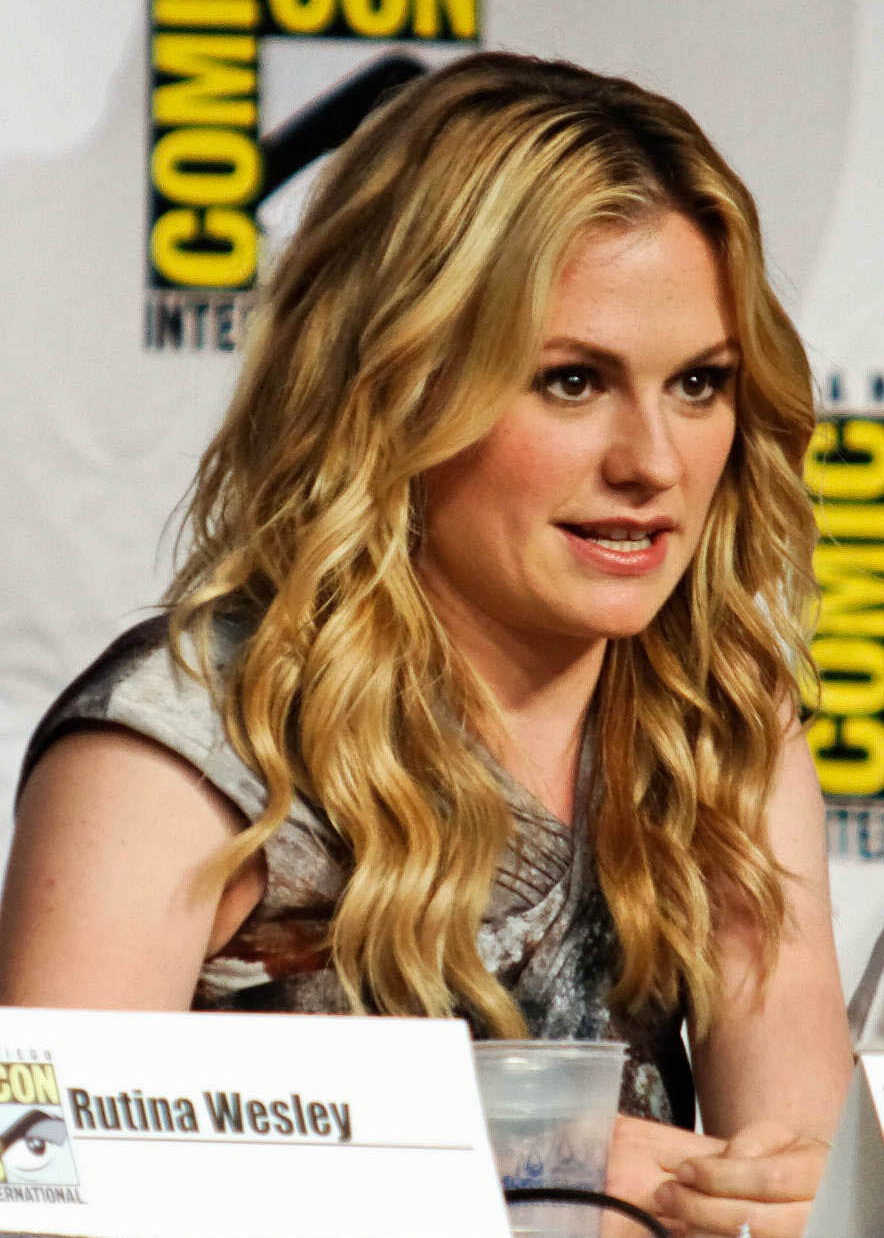
Anna Paquin

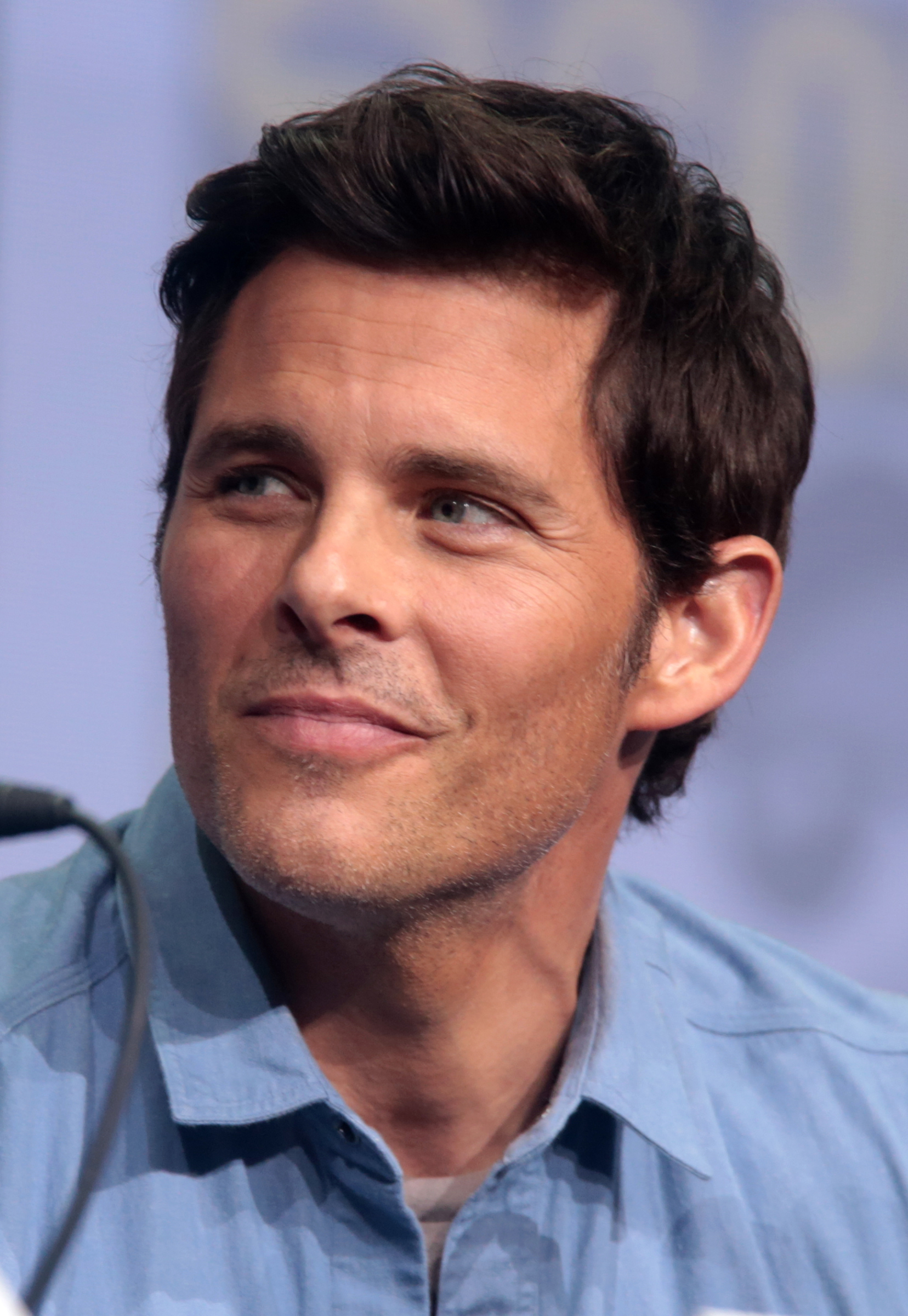
James Marsden

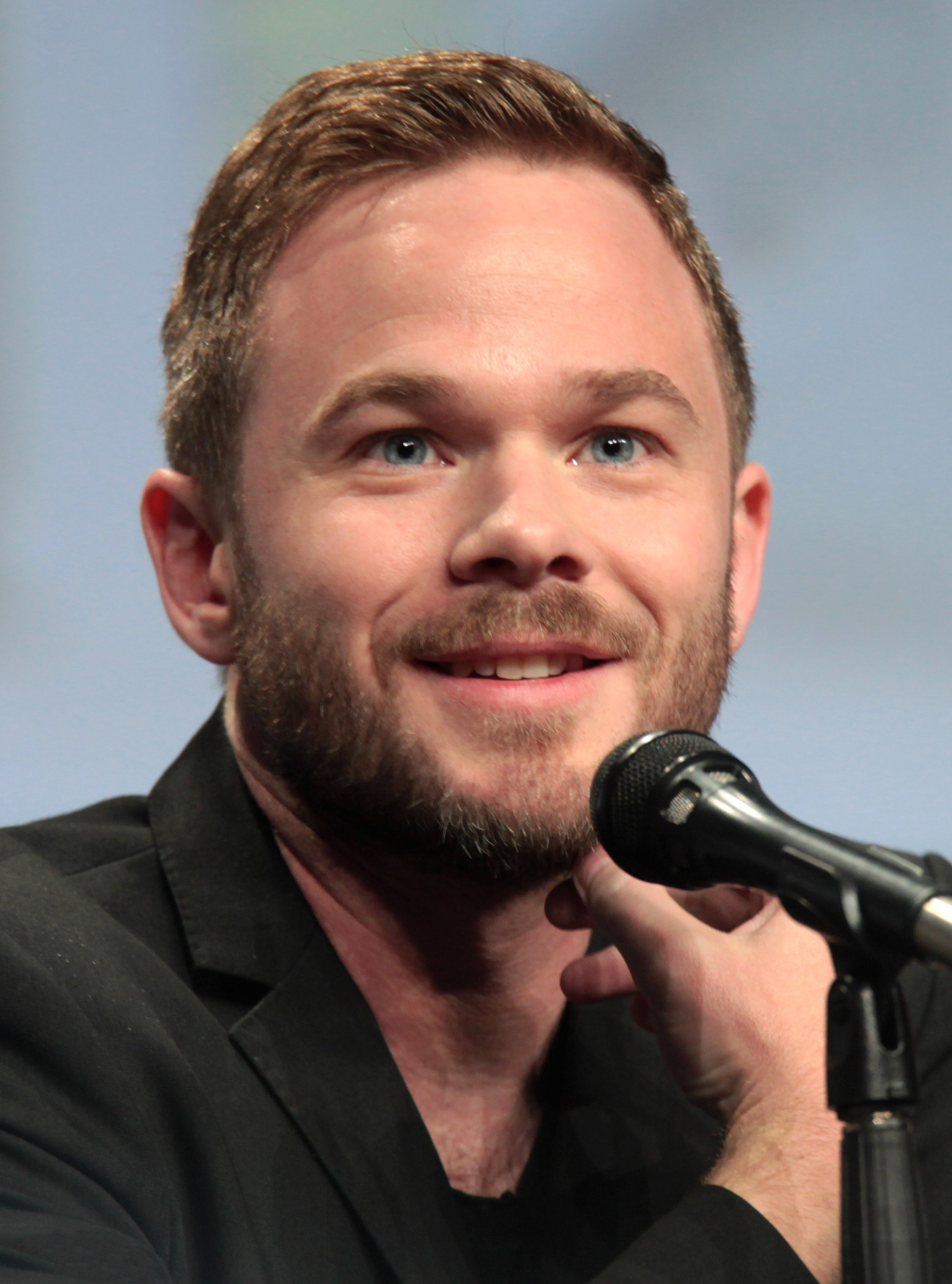
Shawn Ashmore

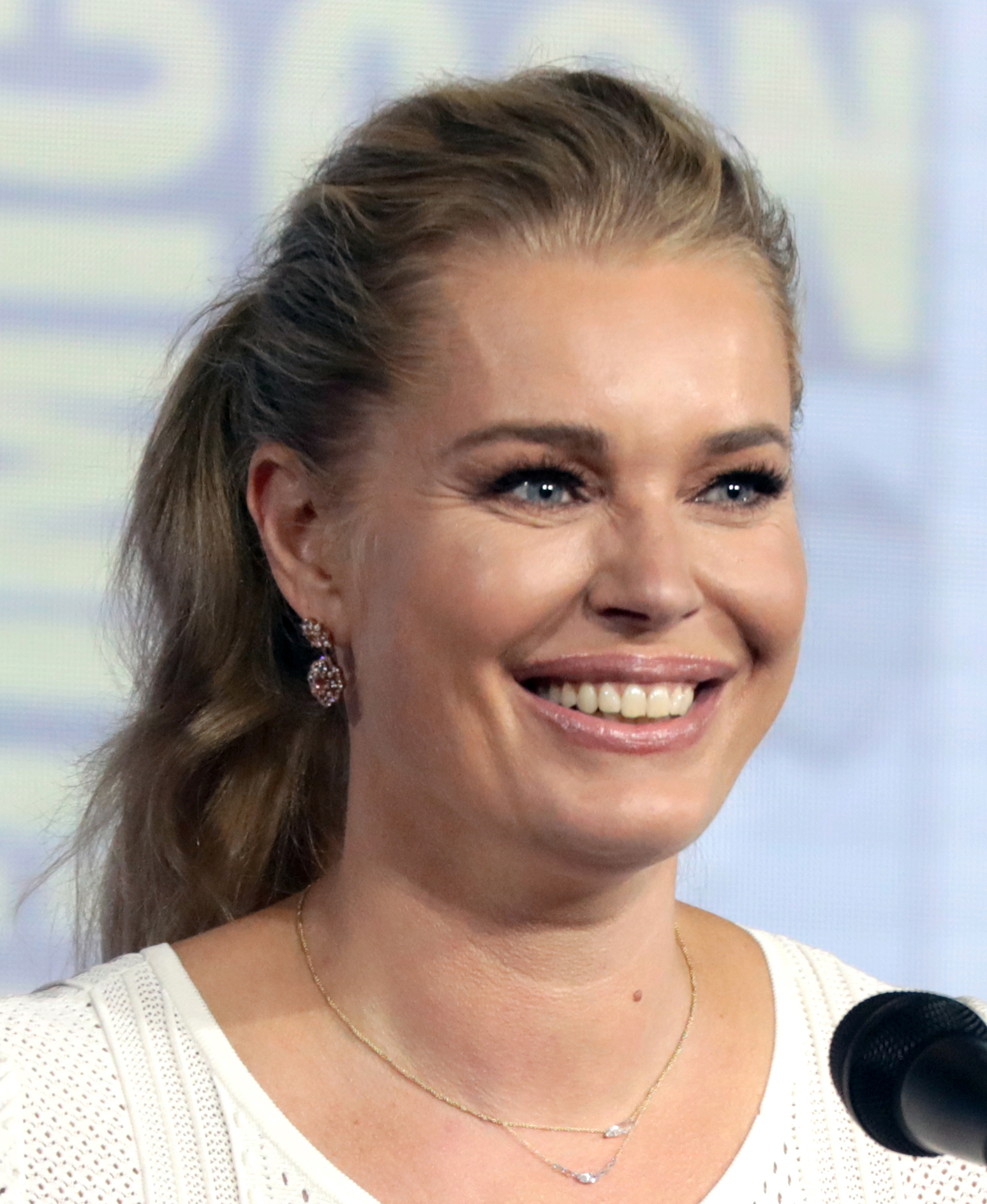
Rebecca Romijn

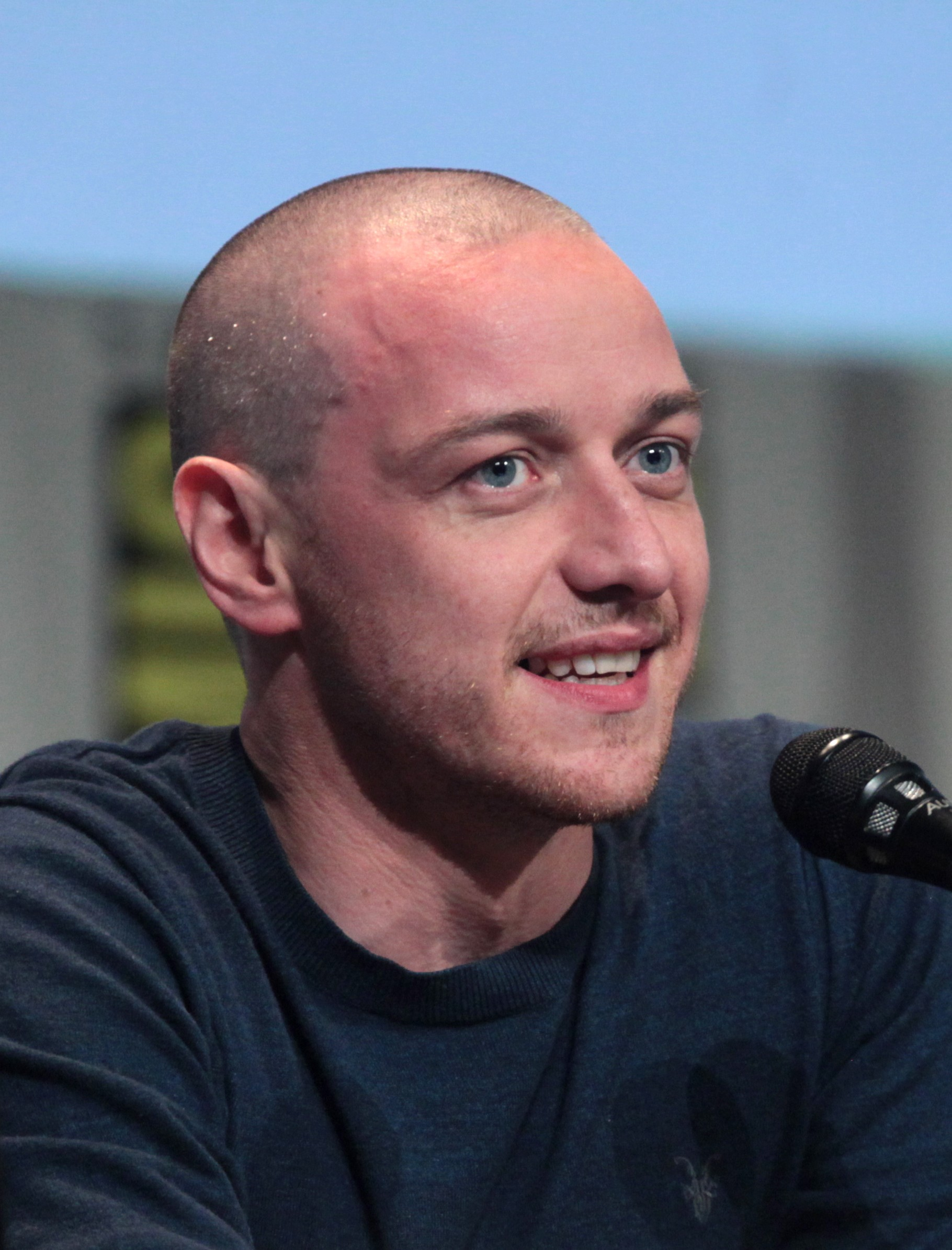
James McAvoy

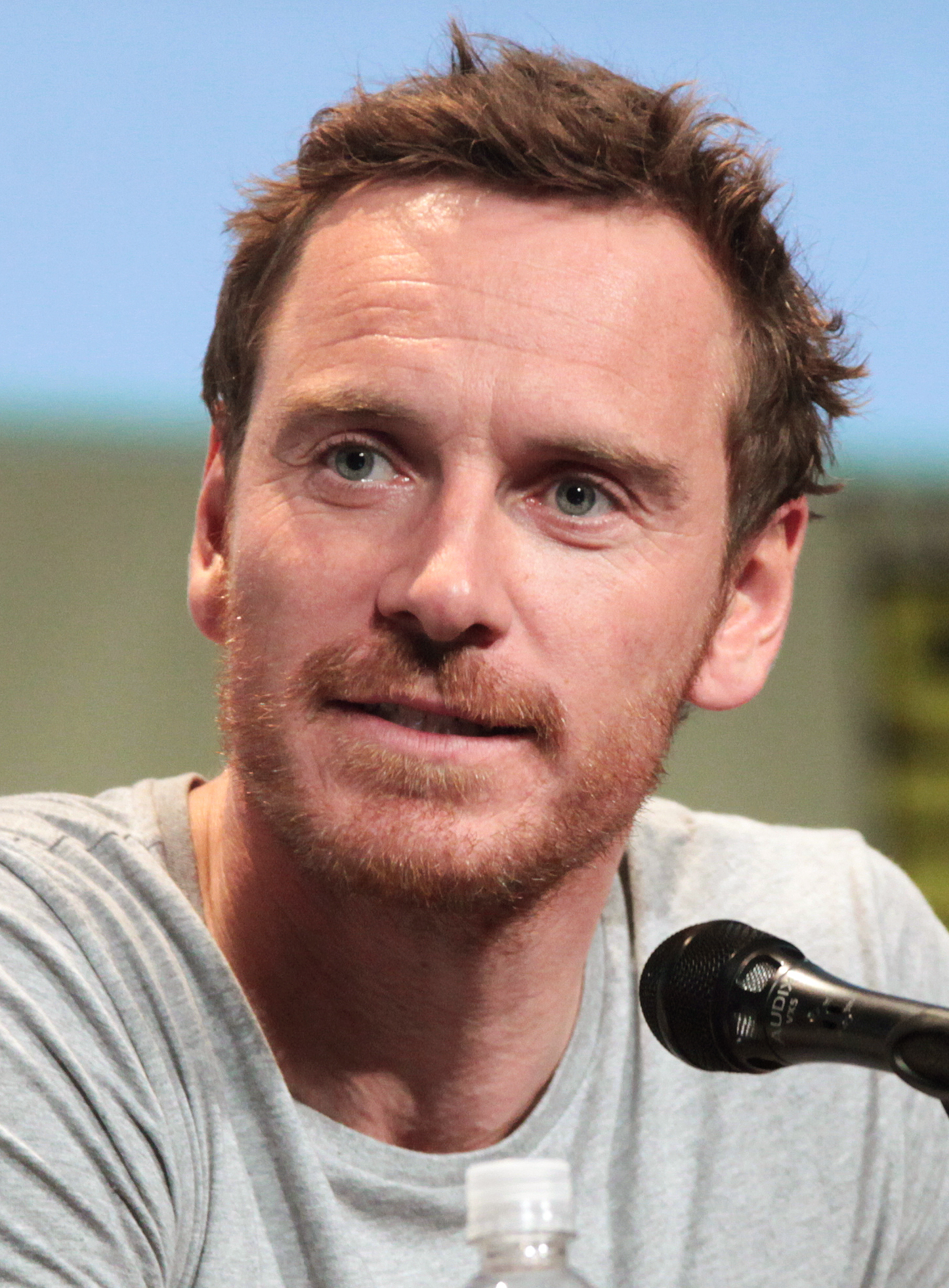
Michael Fassbender

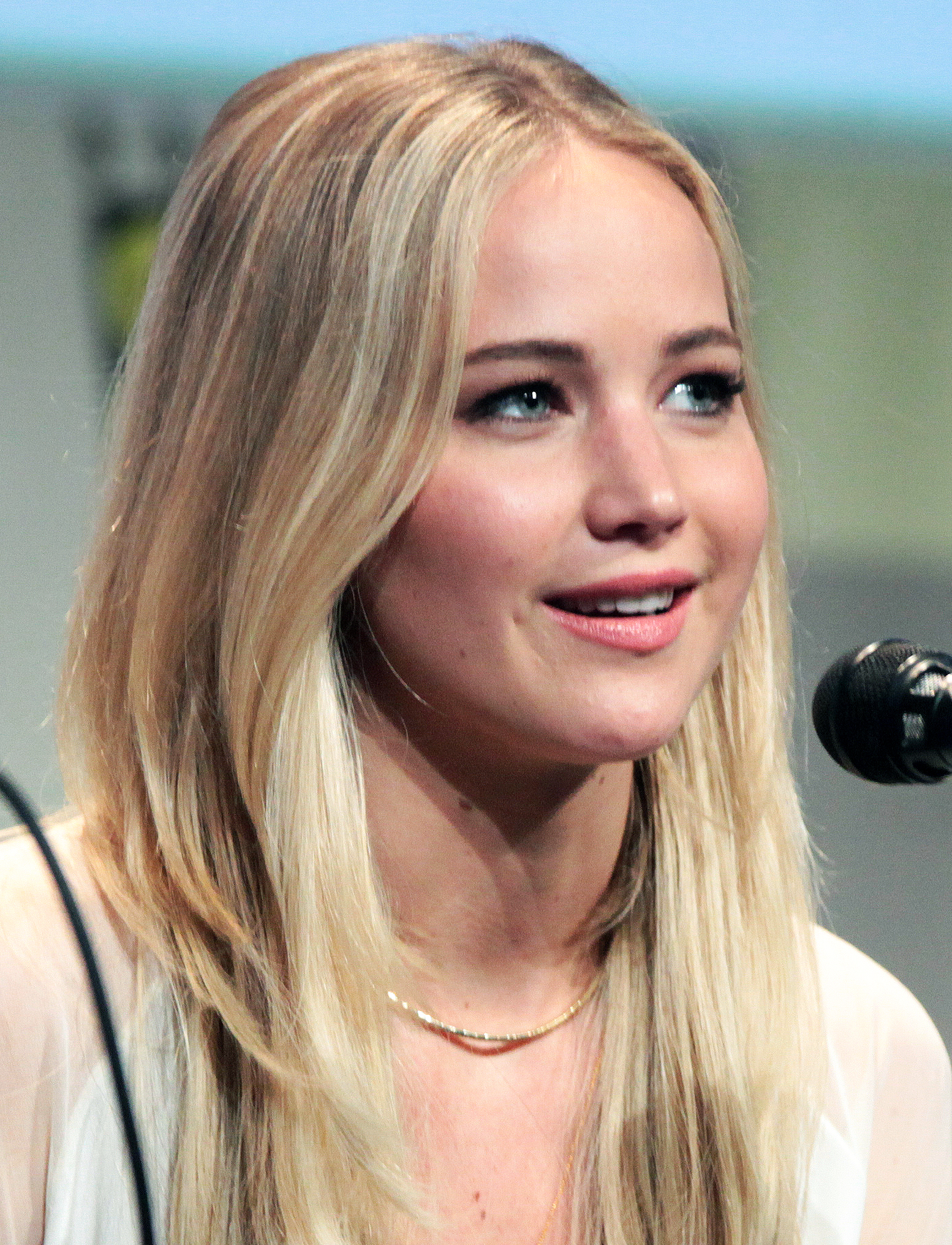
Jennifer Lawrence

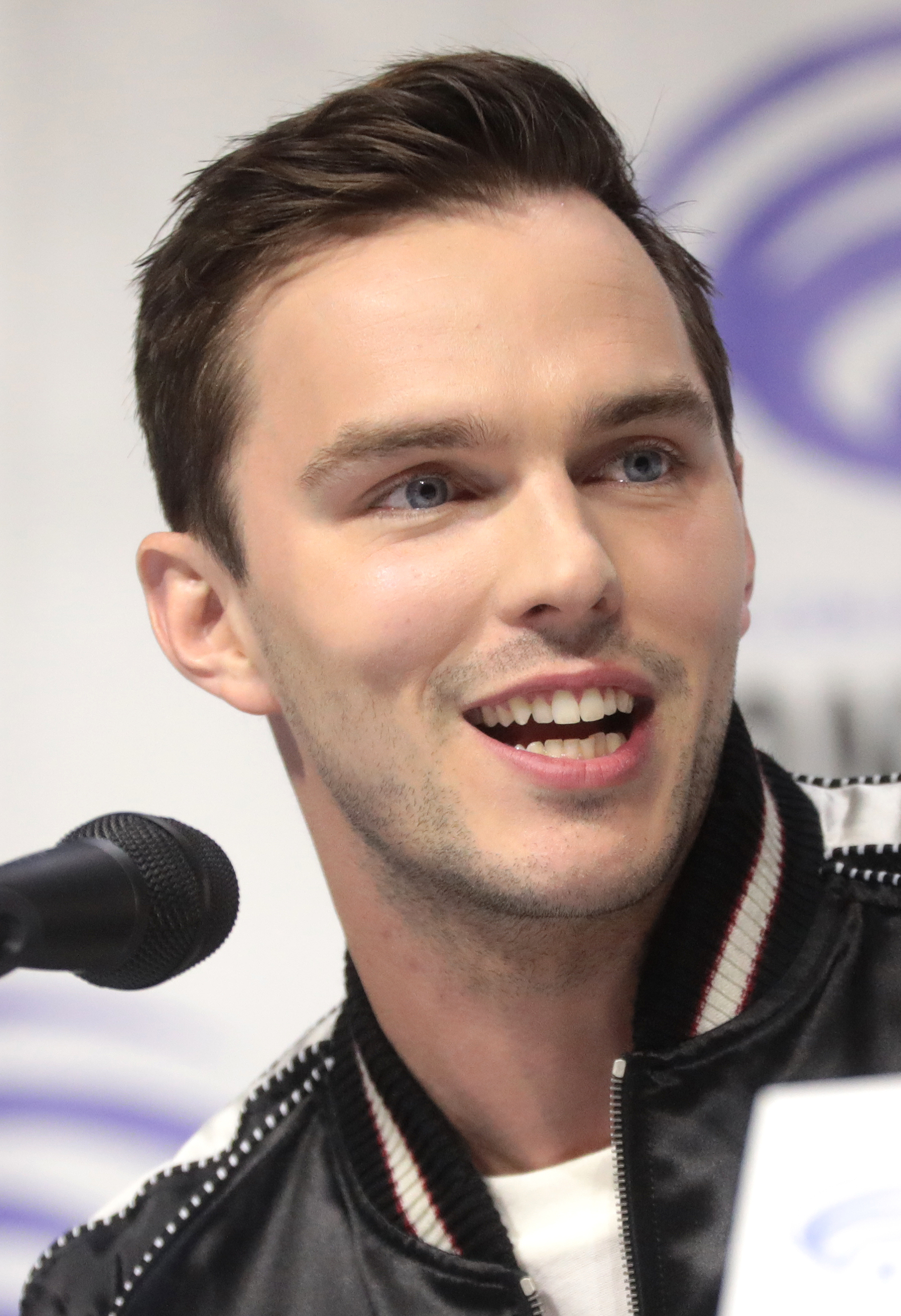
Nicholas Hoult

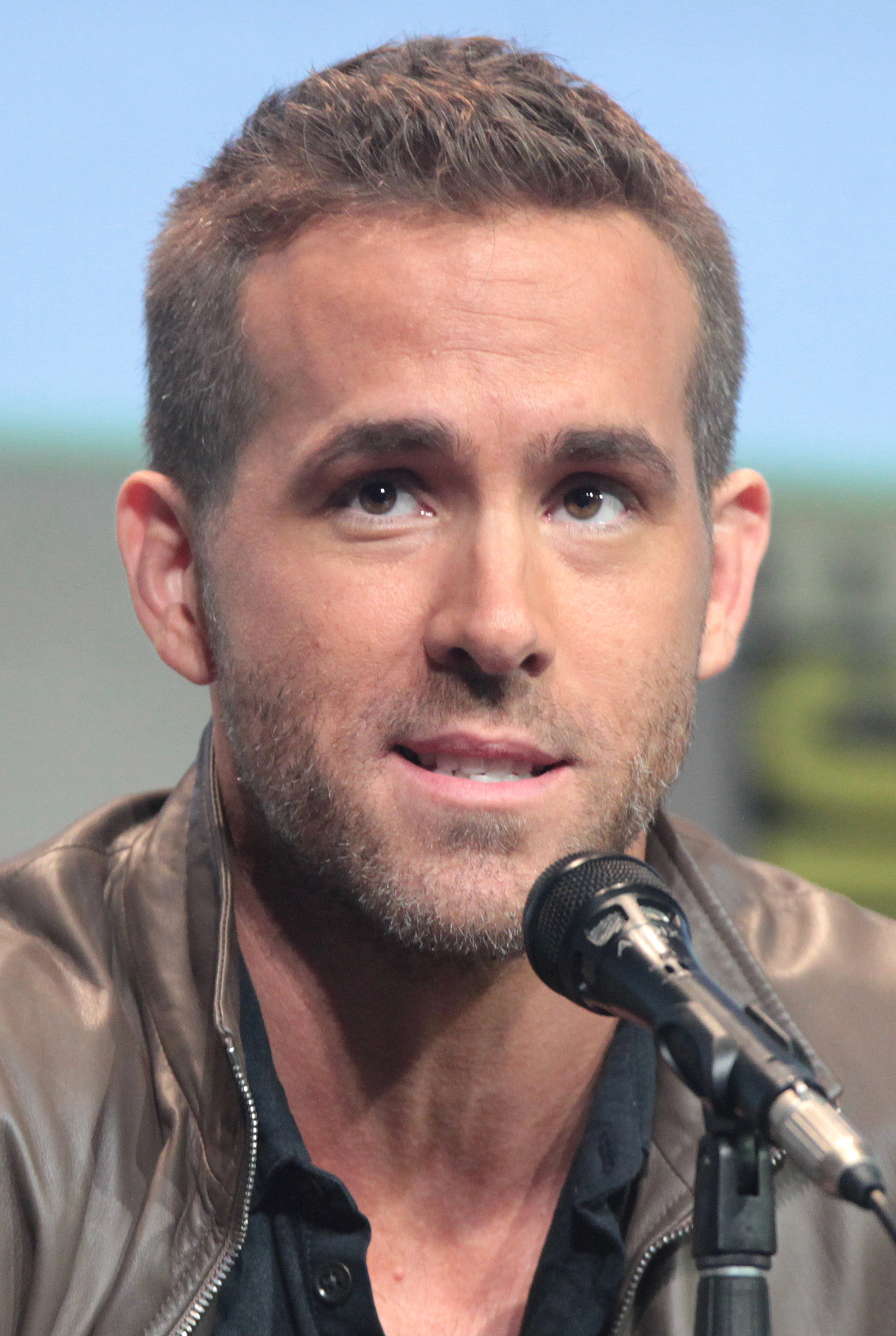
Ryan Reynolds

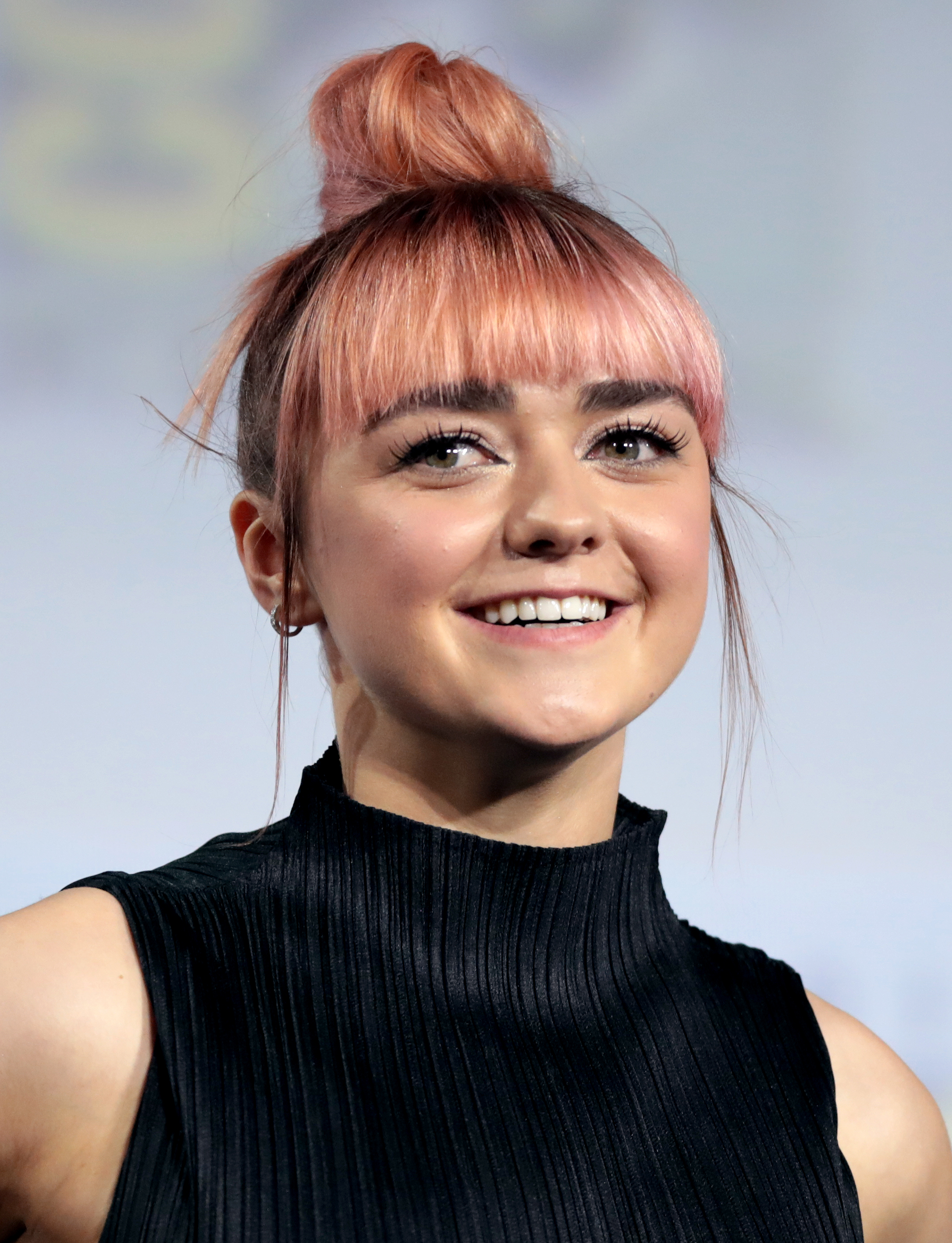
Maisie Williams

Jackman is the most recurring actor in the franchise, appearing in nine films. Stewart, McKellen, Janssen, Berry, Paquin, Marsden, Ashmore, and Romijn star in the original trilogy, while McAvoy, Fassbender, Lawrence, and Hoult are the recurring cast in the latter films. Reynolds headlines the Deadpool films, while Williams co-stars in The New Mutants.

The following is a list of cast members who have portrayed characters appearing in 20th Century Fox's X-Men film series, based upon the Marvel Comics superhero team of the same name and its related characters.

The first three films in the series are X-Men (2000), X2 (2003), and X-Men: The Last Stand (2006), starring Hugh Jackman as James "Logan" Howlett / Wolverine, Patrick Stewart as Charles Xavier / Professor X, Ian McKellen as Erik Lehnsherr / Magneto, Famke Janssen as Jean Grey, Halle Berry as Ororo Munroe / Storm, Anna Paquin as Marie D'Ancanto / Rogue, James Marsden as Scott Summers / Cyclops, Shawn Ashmore as Bobby Drake / Iceman, and Rebecca Romijn as Raven Darkhölme / Mystique. Daniel Cudmore portrays Piotr Rasputin / Colossus in the last two films, while Elliot Page (Note: Credited as Ellen Page; The Last Stand and Days of Future Past were released before Page came out as transgender.) and Kelsey Grammer star as Kitty Pryde and Hank McCoy / Beast, respectively, in the latter. Jackman also stars in a trilogy of films centered on Wolverine, consisting of X-Men Origins: Wolverine (2009), The Wolverine (2013), and Logan (2017), where he is joined by Stewart as Xavier.

James McAvoy, Michael Fassbender, Jennifer Lawrence, and Nicholas Hoult star in X-Men: First Class (2011) as younger versions of Xavier, Lehnsherr, Darkhölme, and McCoy, respectively, while Lucas Till appears as Alex Summers / Havok. X-Men: Days of Future Past (2014) features both the original cast (except for Romijn) and the new actors, while also introducing Evan Peters as Peter Maximoff / Quicksilver. McAvoy, Fassbender, Lawrence, Hoult, Till, and Peters reprise their roles in X-Men: Apocalypse (2016), where Sophie Turner, Tye Sheridan, Kodi Smit-McPhee, and Alexandra Shipp portray younger versions of Grey, Scott Summers, Kurt Wagner / Nightcrawler, and Munroe. Except for Till, all new actors return in Dark Phoenix (2019).

Ryan Reynolds portrays Wade Wilson in X-Men Origins: Wolverine before starring as a new version of the character in the titular role in Deadpool (2016), which also features a new version of Colossus played by Stefan Kapičić, replacing Cudmore. Reynolds reprises his role in the short film No Good Deed (2017), and in Deadpool 2 (2018), in which Kapičić also reprises his role. Maisie Williams, Anya Taylor-Joy, Charlie Heaton, Blu Hunt, and Henry Zaga star as the titular team members Rahne Sinclair, Illyana Rasputin, Samuel Guthrie, Danielle Moonstar, and Roberto da Costa in The New Mutants (2020).

Reynolds, Jackman, Kapičić, Morena Baccarin, Rob Delaney, Brianna Hildebrand, Dafne Keen, Shioli Kutsuna, Tyler Mane, Karan Soni, Aaron Stanford, Lewis Tan, and Leslie Uggams reprise their respective roles in the Marvel Cinematic Universe (MCU) media franchise; the film Deadpool & Wolverine (2024) serves as a sequel to the Deadpool films.

== Films ==
=== Original timeline ===
List indicators

This section includes characters who have appeared in the films.

- An empty grey cell indicates the character was not in the film.
- ^{A} indicates an appearance through archival footage or audio.
- ^{C} indicates a cameo role.
- ^{O} indicates an older version of the character.
- ^{P} indicates an appearance in onscreen photographs.
- ^{V} indicates a voice-only role.
- ^{Y} indicates a younger version of the character.

Character	Original timeline						
Character	X-Men	X2	X-Men: The Last Stand	X-Men Origins: Wolverine	X-Men: First Class	The Wolverine	X-Men: Days of Future Past
Character	2000	2003	2006	2009	2011	2013	2014
==== Introduced in X-Men ====
John Allerdyce Pyro	Alexander Burton^{C}	Aaron Stanford	Aaron Stanford				
Raven Darkhölme Mystique	Rebecca Romijn	Rebecca Romijn	Rebecca Romijn		Jennifer Lawrence; Morgan Lily^{Y} Rebecca Romijn^{O}		Jennifer Lawrence
Bobby Drake Iceman	Shawn Ashmore	Shawn Ashmore	Shawn Ashmore				Shawn Ashmore
Jean Grey	Famke Janssen	Famke Janssen	Famke Janssen; Haley Ramm^{Y}			Famke Janssen	
James "Logan" Howlett Wolverine	Hugh Jackman	Hugh Jackman	Hugh Jackman	Hugh Jackman; Troye Sivan^{Y}	Hugh Jackman^{C}	Hugh Jackman	Hugh Jackman
Robert Kelly	Bruce Davison	Bruce Davison					
Jubilee	Katrina Florece^{C}	Kea Wong	Kea Wong				
Erik Lehnsherr Magneto	Ian McKellen; Brett Morris^{Y}	Ian McKellen	Ian McKellen		Michael Fassbender; Bill Milner^{Y}	Ian McKellen^{C}	Ian McKellen
Marie Rogue	Anna Paquin	Anna Paquin	Anna Paquin				
Ororo Munroe Storm	Halle Berry	Halle Berry	Halle Berry			Halle Berry^{P}	Halle Berry
Kitty Pryde	Sumela Kay^{C}	Katie Stuart	Elliot Page				Elliot Page
Piotr Rasputin Colossus	Donald Mackinnon	Daniel Cudmore	Daniel Cudmore				Daniel Cudmore
Sabretooth	Tyler Mane						
Scott Summers Cyclops	James Marsden	James Marsden	James Marsden	Tim Pocock			
Toad	Ray Park			Stand-in			
Charles Xavier Professor X	Patrick Stewart	Patrick Stewart	Patrick Stewart	Patrick Stewart	James McAvoy; Laurence Belcher^{Y}	Patrick Stewart^{C}	Patrick Stewart
==== Introduced in X2 ====
Theresa Cassidy Siryn		Shauna Kain	Shauna Kain				
Artie Maddicks		Bryce Hodgson					
Hank McCoy Beast		Steve Bacic^{C}	Kelsey Grammer		Nicholas Hoult		
Yuriko Oyama Lady Deathstrike		Kelly Hu					
President of the United States		Cotter Smith	Josef Sommer				
Jason Stryker Mutant 143		Michael Reid McKay		Stand-in			
William Stryker		Brian Cox		Danny Huston			Josh Helman^{C}
Kurt Wagner Nightcrawler		Alan Cumming					
==== Introduced in X-Men: The Last Stand ====
Arclight			Omahyra Mota				
Callisto			Dania Ramirez				
Glob Herman			Clayton Watmough				
Jimmy Leech			Cameron Bright				
Kid Omega			Ken Leung				
Moira MacTaggert			Olivia Williams		Rose Byrne		
Jamie Madrox Multiple Man			Eric Dane				
Cain Marko Juggernaut			Vinnie Jones				
Psylocke			Meiling Melançon				
Kavita Rao			Shohreh Aghdashloo				
Spike			Lance Gibson				
Secretary Trask			Bill Duke				
Warren Worthington II			Michael Murphy				
Warren Worthington III			Ben Foster; Cayden Boyd^{Y}				
==== Introduced in X-Men Origins: Wolverine ====
Chris Bradley				Dominic Monaghan			
Victor Creed				Liev Schreiber; Michael James Olsen^{Y}			
Fred J. Dukes				Kevin Durand			
Dr. Carol Frost				Asher Keddie			
Elizabeth Howlett				Alice Parkinson			
John Howlett				Peter O'Brien			
Heather Hudson				Julia Blake			
Travis Hudson				Max Cullen			
Remy LeBeau Gambit				Taylor Kitsch			
Thomas Logan				Aaron Jeffery			
Emma Silverfox				Tahyna Tozzi			
Kayla Silverfox				Lynn Collins		Lynn Collins^{A}^{V}	
Wade Wilson Weapon XI				Ryan Reynolds Scott Adkins			
John Wraith				will.i.am			
Agent Zero				Daniel Henney			
==== Introduced in X-Men: First Class ====
Amy					Annabelle Wallis		
Azazel					Jason Flemyng		
Sean Cassidy Banshee					Caleb Landry Jones		
Emma Frost					January Jones		
Colonel Hendry					Glenn Morshower		
Man In Black Suit					Oliver Platt		
John A. McCone					Matt Craven		
Armando Muñoz Darwin					Edi Gathegi		
Janos Quested Riptide					Álex González		
Angel Salvadore					Zoë Kravitz		
Sebastian Shaw					Kevin Bacon		
Agent Stryker					Don Creech		
Alex Summers Havok					Lucas Till		
==== Introduced in The Wolverine ====
Dr. Green Viper						Svetlana Khodchenkova	
Kenuichio Harada						Will Yun Lee	
Noburo Mori						Brian Tee	
Ichirō Yashida Silver Samurai						Hal Yamanouchi; Ken Yamamura^{Y}	
Mariko Yashida						Tao Okamoto	
Shingen Yashida						Hiroyuki Sanada	
Yukio						Rila Fukushima	
==== Introduced in X-Men: Days of Future Past ====
Bishop							Omar Sy
Blink							Fan Bingbing
Roberto da Costa Sunspot							Adan Canto
Bolivar Trask							Peter Dinklage^{C}
Warpath							Booboo Stewart

=== Revised timeline ===
List indicators

This section includes characters who have appeared in the films.

- An empty grey cell indicates the character was not in the film.
- ^{A} indicates an appearance through archival footage or audio.
- ^{C} indicates a cameo role.
- ^{MC} indicates a motion-capture-only role.
- ^{O} indicates an older version of the character.
- ^{P} indicates an appearance in onscreen photographs.
- ^{V} indicates a voice-only role.
- ^{Y} indicates a younger version of the character.

Character	Revised timeline							Deadpool & Wolverine
Character	X-Men: Days of Future Past	Deadpool	X-Men: Apocalypse	Logan	Deadpool 2	Dark Phoenix	The New Mutants	Deadpool & Wolverine
Character	2014	2016	2016	2017	2018	2019	2020	2024
==== Introduced in the original timeline ====
John Allerdyce Pyro								Aaron Stanford
Azazel	Jason Flemyng^{P}							Eduardo Gago Munoz
Roberto da Costa Sunspot							Henry Zaga	
Raven Darkhölme Mystique	Jennifer Lawrence		Jennifer Lawrence			Jennifer Lawrence		
Bobby Drake Iceman	Shawn Ashmore^{C}							
Fred J. Dukes			Gustav Claude Ouimet^{C}					
Jean Grey	Famke Janssen^{C}		Sophie Turner			Sophie Turner; Summer Fontana^{Y}		
James "Logan" Howlett Wolverine	Hugh Jackman		Hugh Jackman	Hugh Jackman	Hugh Jackman^{A}			Corpse only
Jubilee			Lana Condor					
Moira MacTaggert			Rose Byrne					
Erik Lehnsherr Magneto	Michael Fassbender		Michael Fassbender			Michael Fassbender		
Marie Rogue	Anna Paquin^{C}							
Cain Marko Juggernaut					Ryan Reynolds^{V}			
Hank McCoy Beast	Nicholas Hoult; Kelsey Grammer^{O}^{C}		Nicholas Hoult		Nicholas Hoult^{C}	Nicholas Hoult		
Ororo Munroe Storm	Halle Berry^{C}		Alexandra Shipp		Alexandra Shipp^{C}	Alexandra Shipp		
Kitty Pryde	Elliot Page^{C}							
Psylocke			Olivia Munn					
Piotr Rasputin Colossus	Daniel Cudmore^{C}	Stefan Kapičić^{V} Andre Tricoteux^{MC}			Stefan Kapičić^{V} Andre Tricoteux^{MC}			Stefan Kapičić^{V}
Sabretooth								Tyler Mane
Angel Salvadore	Zoë Kravitz^{P}							
William Stryker	Josh Helman		Josh Helman					
Alex Summers Havok	Lucas Till		Lucas Till					
Scott Summers Cyclops	James Marsden^{C}		Tye Sheridan		Tye Sheridan^{C}	Tye Sheridan		
Toad	Evan Jonigkeit^{C}							
Bolivar Trask	Peter Dinklage							
Kurt Wagner Nightcrawler			Kodi Smit-McPhee		Kodi Smit-McPhee^{C}	Kodi Smit-McPhee		
Wade Wilson Deadpool		Ryan Reynolds			Ryan Reynolds			Ryan Reynolds
Warren Worthington III Archangel			Ben Hardy					
Charles Xavier	James McAvoy^{Y} Patrick Stewart^{O}		James McAvoy	Patrick Stewart	James McAvoy^{C}	James McAvoy		
Yukio					Shioli Kutsuna			Shioli Kutsuna
==== Introduced in X-Men: Days of Future Past ====
Ink	Gregg Lowe							
Peter Maximoff Quicksilver	Evan Peters		Evan Peters		Evan Peters^{C}	Evan Peters		
Richard Nixon	Mark Camacho							
En Sabah Nur Apocalypse	Brendan Pedder^{C}		Oscar Isaac; Berdj Garabedian^{O}					
==== Introduced in Deadpool ====
Blind Al		Leslie Uggams			Leslie Uggams			Leslie Uggams
Bob		Rob Hayter^{C}						
Vanessa Carlysle		Morena Baccarin			Morena Baccarin			Morena Baccarin
Dopinder		Karan Soni			Karan Soni			Karan Soni
Angel Dust		Gina Carano						
Francis Freeman Ajax		Ed Skrein						
Negasonic Teenage Warhead		Brianna Hildebrand			Brianna Hildebrand			Brianna Hildebrand
Recruiter		Jed Rees						
Weasel		T. J. Miller			T. J. Miller			
==== Introduced in X-Men: Apocalypse ====
Caliban			Tómas Lemarquis	Stephen Merchant				
Death			Monique Ganderton					
Famine			Rochelle Okoye					
Magda Lehnsherr			Carolina Bartczak					
Nina Lehnsherr			T.J. McGibbon					
Pestilence			Warren Scherer					
War			Fraser Aitcheson					
==== Introduced in Logan ====
Delilah				Alison Fernandez				
Gabriela Lopez				Elizabeth Rodriguez				
Maria				Doris Morgado				
Mohawk				Krzysztof Soszynski				
Kathryn Munson				Elise Neal				
Nate Munson				Quincy Fouse				
Will Munson				Eriq La Salle				
Donald Pierce				Boyd Holbrook				
Danny Rhodes				David Kallaway				
Dr. Zander Rice				Richard E. Grant				
Rictor				Jason Genao				
X-23 / Laura				Dafne Keen			Dafne Keen^{A}	Dafne Keen
X-24				Hugh Jackman				
==== Introduced in Deadpool 2 ====
Bedlam					Terry Crews			
Cable					Josh Brolin			
Black Tom Cassidy					Jack Kesy			
Russell Collins Firefist					Julian Dennison Sala Baker^{O}			
Domino					Zazie Beetz			
Headmaster					Eddie Marsan			
Omega Red					Dakoda Shepley^{C}			
Shatterstar					Lewis Tan			Lewis Tan
Vanisher					Brad Pitt^{C}			
Peter Wisdom					Rob Delaney			Rob Delaney
Zeitgeist					Bill Skarsgård			
==== Introduced in Dark Phoenix ====
Ariki						Andrew Stehlin		
Alison Blaire Dazzler						Halston Sage		
Ben Hammil Match						Lamar Johnson		
President of the United States						Brian d'Arcy James		
Selene						Kota Eberhardt		
Vuk						Jessica Chastain		
==== Introduced in The New Mutants ====
Samuel Guthrie Cannonball							Charlie Heaton	
Thomas Guthrie							Thomas Kee	
William Lonestar							Adam Beach	
Danielle Moonstar Mirage							Blu Hunt	
Illyana Rasputina Magik							Anya Taylor-Joy; Colbi Gannett^{Y}	
Cecilia Reyes							Alice Braga	
Craig Sinclair							Happy Anderson	
Rahne Sinclair Wolfsbane							Maisie Williams	

== Crossovers with the Marvel Cinematic Universe ==
Peters, Stewart, Grammer, and Jackman reprised their roles in the Marvel Cinematic Universe (MCU) media franchise as different variants of their respective characters.

List indicators

This section includes characters who will appear or have appeared in the Marvel Cinematic Universe films.

- An empty grey cell indicates the character was not in the film, or that the character's official presence has not yet been confirmed.
- ^{C} indicates a cameo role.

Character	Phase Four	Phase Five		Phase Six
Character	Doctor Strange in the Multiverse of Madness	The Marvels	Deadpool & Wolverine	Avengers: Doomsday
Character	2022	2023	2024	2026
Raven Darkhölme Mystique				Rebecca Romijn
James "Logan" Howlett Wolverine (Note: A yellow-suit variant of James "Logan" Howlett, introduced in Deadpool & Wolverine (2024).)			Hugh Jackman	
Erik Lehnsherr Magneto				Ian McKellen
Hank McCoy Beast (Note: A variant of Hank McCoy from an adjacent X-Men universe, introduced in The Marvels (2023).)		Kelsey Grammer^{C}		Kelsey Grammer
Scott Summers Cyclops				James Marsden
Kurt Wagner Nightcrawler				Alan Cumming
Charles Xavier	Patrick Stewart			Patrick Stewart

== See also ==
- Marvel Cinematic Universe cast members
  - Marvel Cinematic Universe film actors (The Infinity Saga)
  - Marvel Cinematic Universe film actors
- Spider-Man film cast members
