= Possum Trot, Texas =

Unincorporated community in Texas, US

Possum Trot is a small unincorporated community in southeastern Shelby County, Texas, United States, near the city of Huxley and the Louisiana border. Originally settled by small farmers in the late 19th century, Possum Trot's current residents are "mostly working-class African-Americans".

== See also ==
- Sound of Hope: The Story of Possum Trot
