= Possumtrot Branch =

Stream in Walker County, Georgia, U.S.

Coordinates: 34°42′59″N 85°20′05″W

Possumtrot Branch is a stream in Walker County, in the U.S. state of Georgia. It is a tributary to Duck Creek.

It is speculated the name Possumtrot carries a negative connotation for an "uninteresting location".

== See also ==
- List of rivers of Georgia (U.S. state)
