= Batman: Haunted Knight =

1996 DC Comics anthology trade paperback

Publication information
- Publisher: DC Comics
- Publication date: 1996
- Main character(s): Batman; Scarecrow; Mad Hatter

Creative team
- Written by: Jeph Loeb
- Artist: Tim Sale

Collected editions
- Trade Paperback: ISBN 1563892731
- Trade Paperback (Titan Books): ISBN 1852867396
- Absolute Edition: ISBN 1401251226
- 2018 Trade Paperback: ISBN 1401284868
- Deluxe Edition: ISBN 177951638X

Batman: Haunted Knight is an anthology trade paperback published by DC Comics in 1996. It reprinted three one-shot specials from the previous three years (three Batman: Legends of the Dark Knight Halloween Specials). Each of the stories was written by Jeph Loeb and featured art by Tim Sale. The popularity of these three stories led to the three miniseries Batman: The Long Halloween #1-13, Batman: Dark Victory #0-13 and Catwoman: When in Rome #1-6.

== Plot ==
During the story "Fears", Batman is hunting down and trying to capture the Scarecrow. As the title suggests, fear plays a large part in the story, with Batman nearly dying of fear while trapped in a large, poisonous thorn maze.

"Madness" tells the story of Captain James Gordon's daughter, Barbara, being kidnapped by the Mad Hatter and forced to participate in a twisted tea party with other kidnapped children. Batman and Gordon finally save Barbara and bring down the Mad Hatter.

"Ghosts" is a Batman universe version of A Christmas Carol, with Bruce's father Thomas Wayne taking the place of Jacob Marley, and the three spirits being Poison Ivy (the Ghost of Christmas Past), the Joker (the Ghost of Christmas Present), and a Grim Reaper figure (the Ghost of Christmas Yet to Come) who turns out to be Batman's ghost. The message from the spirits is that Bruce should not let Batman take over his entire life.

== Background ==
The graphic novel reprints Batman: Legends of the Dark Knight Halloween Special #1 (1993), Batman: Madness - A Legends Of The Dark Knight Halloween Special (1994), and Batman: Ghosts - A Legends of the Dark Knight Halloween Special (1995) written by Loeb and art by Sale respectively. These stories were specials and spin-offs of Batman: Legends of the Dark Knight series.

== Collected editions ==
The entire series has been collected in trade paperbacks, an absolute edition, and a deluxe edition:

- Trade paperback (ISBN 1563892731), DC Comics, 1996.
- Trade paperback (ISBN 1852867396), Titan Books, 1996.
- Absolute Edition, hardcover (ISBN 1401251226), DC Comics, 2014.
- New trade paperback (ISBN 1401284868), DC Comics, 2018.
- Deluxe Edition, hardcover (ISBN 177951638X), DC Comics, 2022.

== In other media ==
- The Jack-o'-Lantern face made on the Bat-Signal was used in a nightmare sequence in the 2009 game Batman: Arkham Asylum.
- In the 2015 game Batman: Arkham Knight, the Jack-o'-Lantern face was used by the Scarecrow when he abducts Robin (Tim Drake) at the movie studio.
