= Golden Age Collectables =

Shop at Pike Place Market in Seattle, Washington, U.S.

Coordinates: 47.6086°N 122.3409°W

- Logo

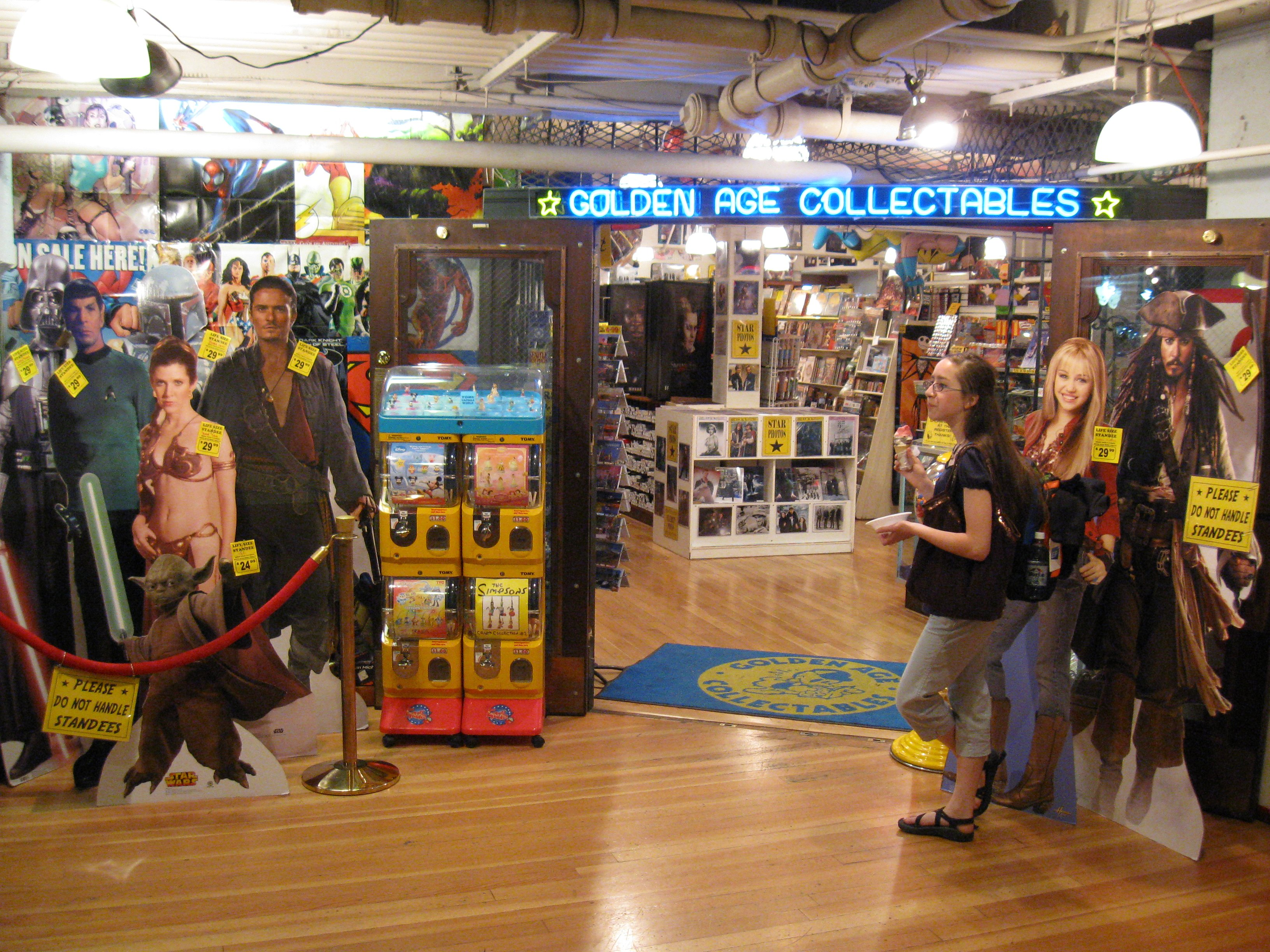
- The shop in 2008
- Founded: 1961; 65 years ago
- Website: goldenagecollectables.com

Golden Age Collectables, described as the world's oldest comic book store, is located at Seattle's Pike Place Market, in the U.S. state of Washington. It was established in 1961.

== Description ==
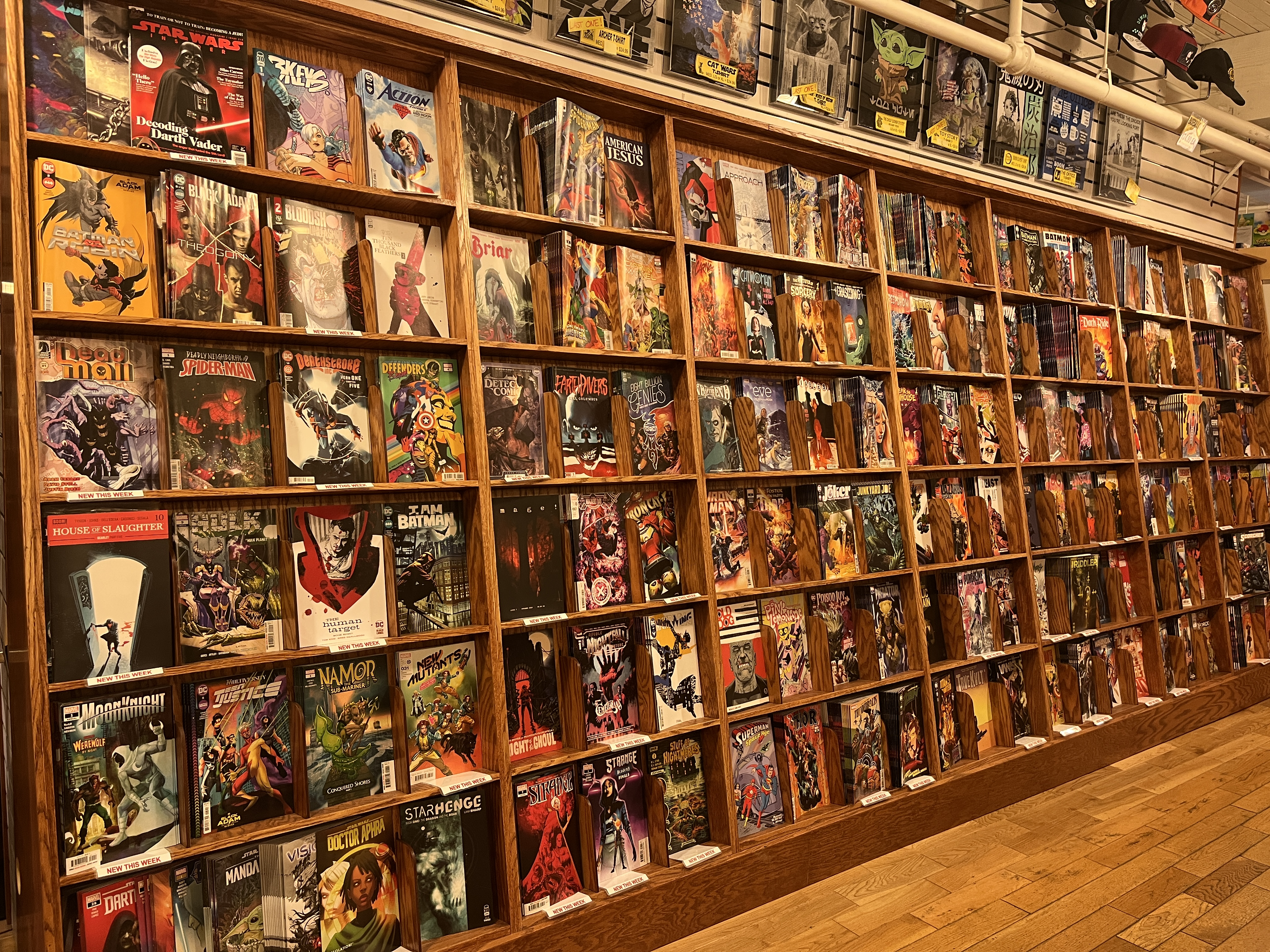
Comic books

Curbed Seattle has described Golden Age Collectables as "Seattle's longest-running comic book shop" and "a popular tourist-photo spot because of a convenient Pike Place Market location and a selfie-ready Batman statue outside". Thrillist has called the shop as "a hodgepodge of nerdy/kitschy knick knacks, comic books and bric-a-brac". The business has also been described as "the largest comic book and movie nostalgia store in the Northwest", as well as the oldest comic book shop in the United States.

The Seattle Times has said the shop is "a full-fledged pop culture emporium". According to Seattle Metropolitan, "Here, each aisle gives way to another just as stocked with age-defying treasures, from a full wall of Funko Pop figures to what feels like an entire franchise worth of Star Wars paraphernalia, to, obviously, rows and rows of comics." Lonely Planet has said, "A haven for geeks, kids and, especially, geeky kids, this shop has comics and comic-book-inspired toys, novelty items (hopping nuns etc) costumes and loads of goth-friendly knickknacks".

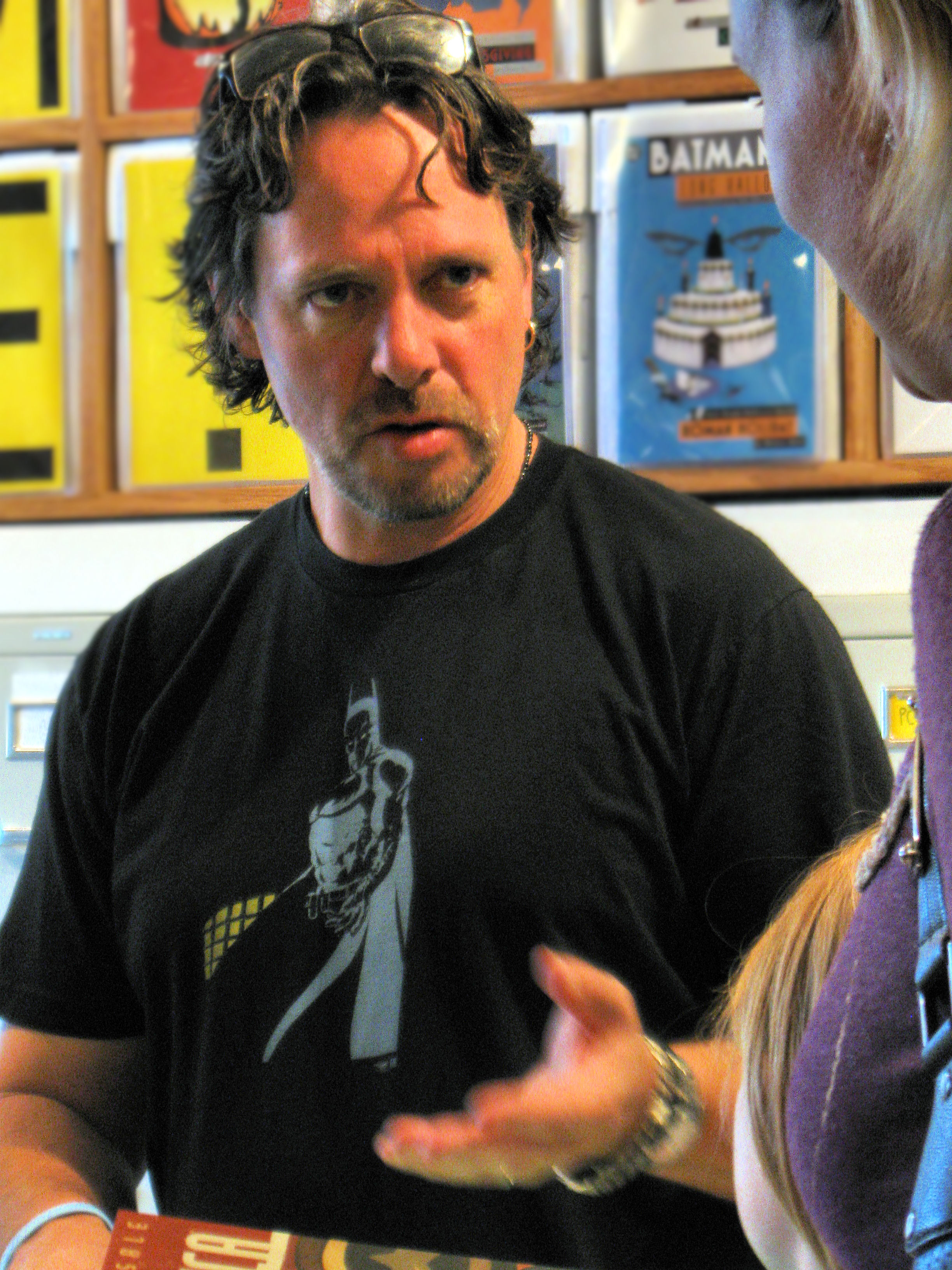
Comic book artist Tim Sale at the shop in 2008

The shop has also stocked autographs and film scripts, as well as Japanese and vintage toys. Golden Age hosts special events such as visits by superheroes.

== History ==
Established in 1961, Golden Age Collectables is billed as the oldest comic book shop in the world. Rod Dyke has owned the business since 1971. The Seattle Times described him as a co-owner in 2008. His wife Colleen Dyke also helps run the business.

== Reception ==
In Seattle Family Adventures: City Escapades, Day Trips, Weekend Getaways, and Itineraries for Fun-Loving Families (2017), Kate Calamusa said a visit to the shop "is sure to bring out everyone's inner kid with its extensive collection of comics, toys, and games". In his 2020 book Moon Pacific Coast Highway Road Trip: California, Oregon & Washington, Ian Anderson called Golden Age "a throwback where just about everything is nostalgic", with "kitschy items from lunch boxes to bobbleheads". He recommended, "Step inside to summon your inner nerd.
