= Jeph Loeb =

American writer

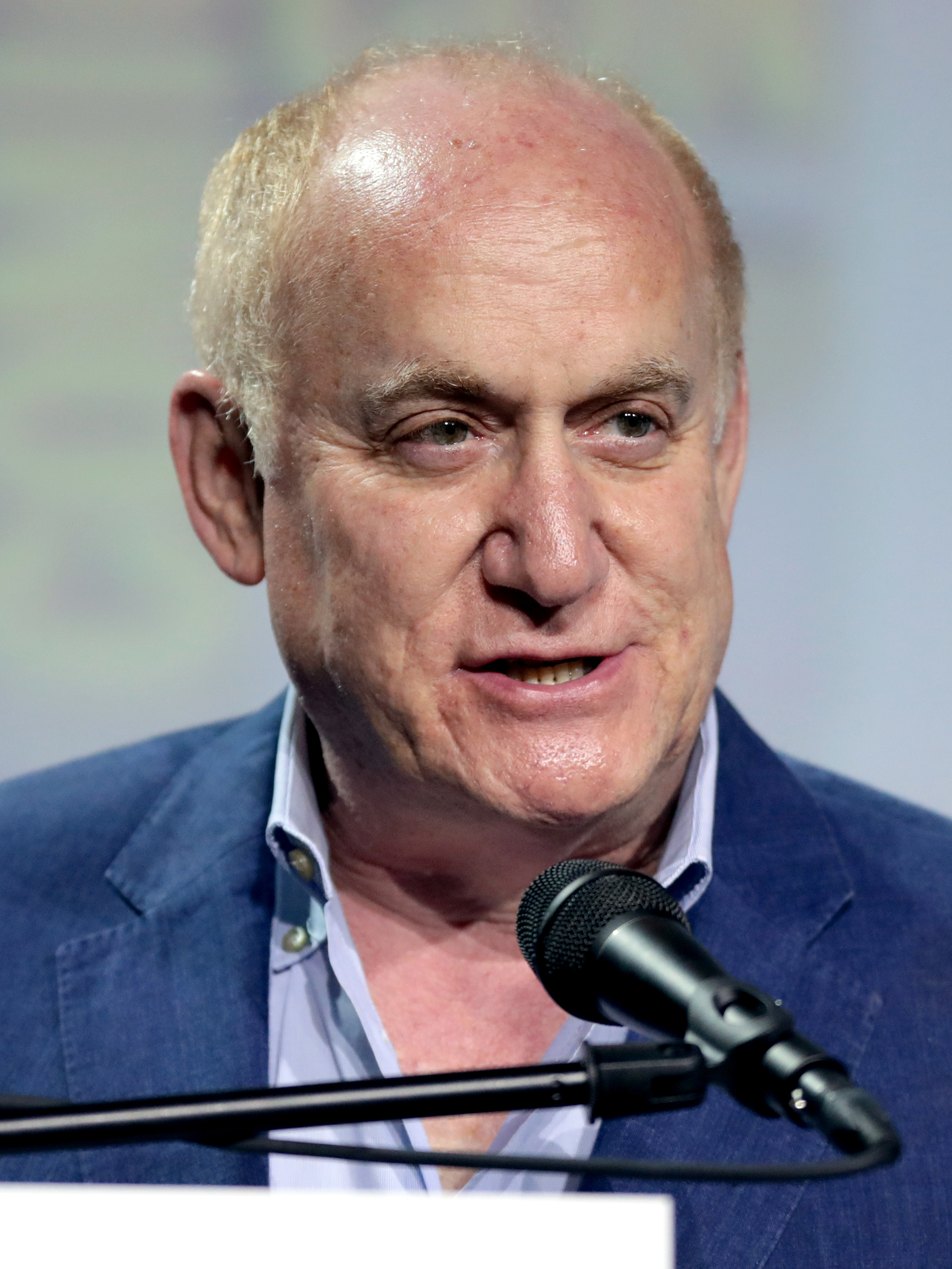
- Loeb at the 2019 San Diego Comic-Con
- Born: Joseph Loeb III Stamford, Connecticut, U.S.
- Areas: Writer, executive producer
- Notable works: Comics: Batman: Hush, Batman: The Long Halloween, Daredevil: Yellow, Hulk: Gray, Spider-Man: Blue, Superman/Batman; Film and television: Commando, Lost, Teen Wolf, Runaways, Agents of S.H.I.E.L.D., Marvel's Netflix television series, Cloak & Dagger, Adventure into Fear
- Awards: Nominated Emmy Award, WGA Award HEROES Season 1, Eisner Awards (4 times), Wizard Awards (5 times), Jules Verne Award, Honorary doctorate, St. Edward's University (Austin, Texas), Inkpot Award

Joseph "Jeph" Loeb III (/loʊb/) is an American film and television writer, producer and comic book writer. Loeb was a producer/writer on the TV series Smallville and Lost, writer for the films Commando and Teen Wolf, and a writer and co-executive producer on the NBC TV show Heroes from its premiere in 2006 to November 2008. From 2010 to 2019, Loeb was the Head of and Executive Vice President of Marvel Television.

A four-time Eisner Award winner and five-time Wizard Fan Awards winner, Loeb's comic book work, which has appeared on the New York Times Best Seller list, includes work on many major characters, including Spider-Man, Batman, Superman, Hulk, Captain America, Cable, Iron Man, Daredevil, Supergirl, the Avengers, and Buffy the Vampire Slayer, much of which he has produced in collaboration with artist Tim Sale.

== Early life ==
Jeph Loeb was raised in a Jewish family in Stamford, Connecticut. He began collecting comic books in mid-1970.

Loeb's stepfather was a vice-president at Brandeis University. At Brandeis University, Loeb met one of his mentors and greatest influences in comic book writing, writer Elliot S. Maggin. Loeb attended Columbia University, where he was a member of the Zeta Beta Tau fraternity. He graduated with a Bachelor of Arts and a Master's degree in Film. His instructors included Paul Schrader.

== Career ==
=== Film and television ===
Loeb's debut in filmmaking was his collaboration with Matthew Weisman in authoring the script of Teen Wolf. The film was released on August 23, 1985, and was a notable starring role for Michael J. Fox. Loeb and Weisman then collaborated in writing the script of Commando. The film was released on October 4, 1985, and starred Arnold Schwarzenegger. His next screen credit was the film Burglar, released on March 20, 1987. The plot was based on the novels of Lawrence Block about fictional burglar Bernie Rhodenbarr. His collaborators were Weisman and Hugh Wilson.

The film was atypical for the time, featuring a female comedic role for starring actress Whoopi Goldberg. His second film that year was Teen Wolf Too, a sequel of Teen Wolf, which was co-written by Weisman and Tim Kring. The film was released on November 20, 1987. The film featured teen idol Jason Bateman and veteran actor John Astin. Loeb would re-team with Kring almost two decades later for the TV series Heroes. Four years later, Loeb was working on a script for The Flash as a feature with Warner Bros. While the script deal fell through, Loeb met then publisher Jenette Kahn who asked Loeb to write a comic book for DC Comics.

In 2002, Loeb wrote the script for the episode of Smallville, entitled "Red", which introduced red kryptonite into the series. He became a supervising producer and has written many episodes since then. He signed a three-year contract, and although producers Miles Millar and Alfred Gough offered to keep him on for future seasons, Loeb left to care for his son, who had cancer.

Loeb later became a writer/producer on the ABC TV series Lost during that show's second season. Leaving Lost, Loeb went on to become Co-Executive Producer and writer on the NBC drama Heroes, which his colleague Tim Kring had created. Loeb wrote the teleplay for the first-season episodes "One Giant Leap" and "Unexpected". The show prominently features the artwork of Tim Sale, Loeb's longtime comics collaborator.

The series was nominated for the 2007 Emmy Award for Outstanding Drama Series, and a Writers Guild of America award for Best New Series. It won the People's Choice Award for Favorite New TV Drama, as well the Saturn Award for Best Network Television Series. It was also nominated for the Golden Globe Award for Best Dramatic Television Series.

Loeb and Tim Kring were presented with the Jules Verne Award for Artistic Achievement at the Jules Verne Festival in Paris, France, on April 22, 2007, for their work on Heroes. Loeb was also presented with a belated 2005 Jules Verne Award for Best Writing for his work on Smallville, which he had not previously been given because his trip to the Festival that year had been cancelled due to his son's ill health.

On November 2, 2008, Daily Variety reported that Loeb and fellow Heroes co-executive producer, Jesse Alexander, were no longer employed on the series. In an interview with Comic Book Resources, Loeb stated, "As of today, Jesse Alexander and I have left Heroes. I'm incredibly proud to have been a big part of the success a show with eight Emmy nods and a win this year for NBC.com. I will miss the superb cast and writing staff and wish everyone the best." At the time, Loeb had completed writing and producing the third-season episode, "Dual".

On June 28, 2010, Marvel Entertainment, as part of its expansion into television, appointed Loeb to the position of Executive Vice President, Head of Television of the newly created Marvel Television, in which Loeb would work with publisher Dan Buckley, to create both live-action and animated shows based on Marvel's catalog of characters. During his time as the head of Marvel Television, he executive produced live-action shows within the Marvel Cinematic Universe such as Agents of S.H.I.E.L.D., Agent Carter, and Inhumans, shows on Netflix such as Daredevil, Jessica Jones, Iron Fist, The Punisher, Luke Cage, and the miniseries The Defenders, along with younger adult shows like Runaways and Cloak & Dagger, and other live action or animated shows based on Marvel characters like M.O.D.O.K., The Gifted, Legion, and Helstrom.

In October 2019, Marvel Studios President Kevin Feige was promoted to Chief Creative Officer of Marvel Entertainment, which includes Marvel Television, prompting Loeb to leave the company after nearly a decade. Loeb had been planning his departure prior to Feige's promotion.

=== Comics career ===
Loeb is known for his extensive use of narration boxes as monologues to reveal the inner thoughts of characters, though the character interactions he writes are sparse in terms of dialogue.

Loeb's first comic work was Challengers of the Unknown vol. 2 #1 – #8 (March – October 1991), which was the first of many collaborations with Tim Sale. Their later collaborations included the "Year 1"-centered Batman: Legends of the Dark Knight Halloween Specials; Batman: The Long Halloween, a 13-issue limited series; and Batman: Dark Victory, a 14-issue limited series set in the first years of the hero's career. The Long Halloween was one of three noted comics that influenced the 2005 feature film Batman Begins, the others being Batman: The Man Who Falls and Batman: Year One. Other Loeb-Sale collaborations at DC include the Superman for All Seasons limited series and Catwoman: When in Rome.

At Marvel Comics, Loeb worked on the "Age of Apocalypse" crossover storyline in 1995 and co-created the character X-Man with artist Steve Skroce. Loeb wrote the "Heroes Reborn" version of Captain America in 1996–1997. He and Tim Sale crafted several limited series for Marvel including Daredevil: Yellow, Spider-Man: Blue, and Hulk: Gray.

Loeb became the writer of Superman with issue #151 (Dec. 1999). His tenure on the title, largely drawn by Ed McGuinness, included the "Emperor Joker" and "Our Worlds at War" crossovers. He left Superman with issue #183 (August 2002). At the end of 2002, Loeb teamed with artist Jim Lee to create the year-long story arc "Batman: Hush", which spawned three lines of toys, posters and calendars, and sat at the #1 spot for eleven of the twelve months it was in publication. The following year, Loeb and McGuinness launched Superman/Batman. Loeb's run on the title spawned a new ongoing Supergirl series, and an animated film adapted from Loeb's "Public Enemies" story arc.

After signing an exclusive contract with Marvel in September 2005, Loeb launched Hulk with artist Ed McGuinness, in which he introduced the Red Hulk.

In 2006, Loeb chose his hometown of Stamford, Connecticut, to be devastated by Nitro in the first issue of the 2006–2007 Marvel miniseries Civil War, the central title of the crossover storyline of the same name. That same year, Marvel announced an untitled Spider-Man series by Loeb and J. Scott Campbell, to be released "sometime in 2007". The series was subsequently cancelled and then brought back on the schedule in 2010, with a 2011 article mentioning it was "still being worked on". In 2021, Campbell confirmed that the project has been cancelled despite having two fully pencilled issues.

In 2007, Loeb wrote the miniseries Fallen Son: The Death of Captain America, which used the five stages of grief as a motif to explore reactions of various characters of the Marvel Universe to the loss of the assassinated Captain America. The first issue ranked No. 1 in sales for April 2007, and the fifth and final issue, dated July 4, 2007, was the "Funeral for Captain America", which was covered by the Associated Press and The Washington Post.

Loeb wrote two miniseries for the Ultimate Marvel Universe. His work on The Ultimates 3 in 2007, with artist Joe Madureira, was panned by critics for its use of transgressive sexual and violent content for shock value "without the political relevance or epic pacing of the first two volumes." In 2008, Loeb returned to the Ultimate Universe with artist David Finch for the critically reviled five-issue miniseries Ultimatum. Described in a 2015 Vulture retrospective as "one of the biggest creative disasters in comics history", Ultimatum's gratuitous murder scenes permanently damaged sales across the entire Ultimate Universe and in the long run brought about its cancellation. "Over the course of just five issues, 34 different heroes and villains were murdered, often by gruesome means: Doctor Strange was squeezed until his head exploded; Magneto was decapitated; the Blob ate the Wasp and, while holding her half-devoured corpse, belched out, 'Tastes like chicken'; and so on." The review site Let's Be Friends Again described Ultimatum as "a base and insulting comic book." Critic Jason Kerouac wrote, "Ultimatum #5 could quite possibly be the single worst piece of writing in recorded history."

A Captain America: White limited series was announced in 2008 but only a #0 issue was published. The long-delayed project was scheduled to finally see print in September 2015.

Loeb shares his writing studio, The Empath Magic Tree House, with Geoff Johns and Allan Heinberg.

== Personal life ==
Loeb's son, Sam, died on June 17, 2005, at the age of 17, after a three-year battle with bone cancer. In June 2006, Sam had a story published in Superman/Batman #26, which was nearly completed before his death. His father finished the work with the help of 25 other writers and artists, all of whom were friends of Sam, including Geoff Johns, John Cassaday, Ed McGuinness, Joe Madureira, Rob Liefeld, and Joss Whedon. The issue also featured a tale titled "Sam's Story", dedicated to Sam, in which a boy named Sam serves as the inspiration for Clark Kent to later become Superman.

== Racial controversy ==
During Loeb's tenure as the head of Marvel Television, the Netflix shows Daredevil, Iron Fist and The Defenders were criticized for promoting negative stereotypes of East Asians and East Asian culture. Following the controversy surrounding Iron Fist's casting, Loeb defended the casting of white actor Finn Jones, emphasizing that Danny Rand's status as an "outsider" was a vital theme of the show.

While promoting the second season of Iron Fist at San Diego Comic-Con 2018, Loeb appeared on stage wearing a karate gi and headband as part of a comic bit with Iron Fist actress Jessica Henwick, who forced him to remove the costume. The stunt was criticized as culturally insensitive.

During the #SaveDaredevilCon panel for Comic-Con@Home in July 2020, Peter Shinkoda, a Canadian actor of Japanese descent who played recurring villain Nobu Yoshioka on Daredevil, suggested that Loeb forced the show's writers to drop proposed storylines fleshing out Nobu and fellow recurring villain Madame Gao. Shinkoda accused Loeb of explaining to writers that "there were three previous Marvel movies, a trilogy called Blade that was made where Wesley Snipes killed 200 Asians each movie. Nobody gives a shit so don't write about Nobu and Gao." Shinkoda also claimed that he and Gao's actress Wai Ching Ho were not invited to the season 2 premiere of Daredevil and received less payment than the extras. Co-star Tommy Walker said that Daredevil and Defenders showrunner Doug Petrie had previously pitched a multiracial Asian American version of Iron Fist to Marvel Television in early development, but was rejected by Loeb.

== Reception ==
=== Awards and nominations ===
==== Eisner Awards ====
- 1998 Best Limited Series for Batman: The Long Halloween
- 1999 Best Reprint Graphic Album for Batman: The Long Halloween
- 2002 Best Reprint Graphic Album for Batman: Dark Victory
- 2007 Best Single Issue or One-Shot for Batman/The Spirit #1

==== Eisner Nominations ====
- 1999 Best Writer for Superman For All Seasons
- 1999 Best Limited Series for Superman For All Seasons

==== Wizard Fan Awards ====
- 1997 Favorite One Shot or Mini-Series for Batman: The Long Halloween
- 1998 Favorite One Shot or Mini-Series for Superman For All Seasons
- 2003 Favorite Ongoing Series for Batman
- 2003 Comics' Greatest Moment of the Year for Clayface returning as Jason Todd in Batman #617
- 2003 Favorite Supporting Character 2003 for Catwoman (in Batman)

=== Critical reaction ===
Many of Loeb's books, such as Batman: The Long Halloween, Superman For All Seasons, and the Marvel "color" books (Daredevil: Yellow, Spider-Man: Blue, Hulk: Gray) have garnered critical praise, and have been adapted into other media.

Hulk #1, in which Loeb introduced the Red Hulk, was the #1 selling comic book for January 2008. Subsequent issues sold well, but received mixed to negative reviews. Issues #7–9 of the series, along with King-Size Hulk #1, were collected into a trade paperback volume, Hulk: Red and Green, which made the New York Times Graphic Books Best Seller List in May 2009 (as did Buffy the Vampire Slayer Season 8, Volume 4, on which Loeb collaborated).

The first issue of Loeb's The Ultimates 3 continued the series' history of ranking at No. 1 in sales, though the series was much less well-received critically than its predecessors.

The first issue of Ultimatum ranked No. 1 in sales for November 2008. At Weekly Comic Book Review, Andrew C. Murphy gave it a B+, praising David Finch's art, while Ben Berger gave it a C, opining that there was too much exposition, but praising Finch's art. The rest of the series, however, received more negative reviews. IGN's Jesse Schedeen gave the series' final issue a scathing review, saying, "Ultimatum is one of the worst comics I have ever read," and called it "the ultimate nightmare." Points of criticism among these reviews included the level of graphic violence, which included cannibalism, and the notion that the series was sold on the basis of its shock value, with some reviewers singling out Loeb's dialogue, characterization and storytelling, others asserting the story's lack of originality, or opining that the series would've been better suited to someone who had previously been more involved with the Ultimate line, such as Brian Michael Bendis or Mark Millar.

In 2009 Ultimates 3 and Ultimatum were included on ComicsAlliance's list of The 15 Worst Comics of the Decade.

Loeb was also awarded an honorary doctorate by St. Edward's University in Austin, Texas, and an Inkpot Award.

== Bibliography ==
=== DC Comics ===
- Challengers of the Unknown vol. 2 #1–8 (with Tim Sale, 1991)
  - Loeb and Sale produced an epilogue, intended for publication in the Justice League Quarterly series, but that title was cancelled before the story saw print.
  - Loeb-written, Sale-drawn profile pages have appeared in Who's Who #1 (Challengers of the Unknown, 1990) and #16 (The New Challengers of the Unknown, 1992)
  - Collected (along with the epilogue) as Challengers of the Unknown Must Die! (tpb, 224 pages, 2004, ISBN 1-4012-0374-4; hc, 248 pages, 2018, ISBN 1-4012-7885-X)
- Batman:
  - Batman: Haunted Knight (tpb, 192 pages, 1996, ISBN 1-56389-273-1; Absolute Edition, hc, 336 pages, 2014, ISBN 1-4012-5122-6) collects:
    - Batman: Legends of the Dark Knight Halloween Special: "Choices" (retitled "Fears" for the collected edition; with Tim Sale, one-shot, 1993)
    - Batman: Madness — A Legends of the Dark Knight Halloween Special (with Tim Sale, one-shot, 1994)
    - Batman: Ghosts — A Legends of the Dark Knight Halloween Special (with Tim Sale, one-shot, 1995)
  - Batman: The Long Halloween #1–13 (with Tim Sale, 1996–1997) collected as Batman: The Long Halloween (hc, 368 pages, 1998, ISBN 1-56389-427-0; tpb, 1998, ISBN 1-56389-469-6)
    - A four-page sequence cut from the original limited series was drawn for and published in Batman: The Long Halloween Absolute Edition (hc, 400 pages, 2007, ISBN 1-4012-1282-4)
    - A black-and-white version of the original limited series with the new sequence was published as Batman Noir: The Long Halloween (hc, 384 pages, 2014, ISBN 1-4012-4883-7)
  - Batman: Dark Victory #0–13 (with Tim Sale, 1999–2000) collected as Batman: Dark Victory (hc, 392 pages, 2001, ISBN 1-56389-738-5; tpb, 2002, ISBN 1-56389-868-3)
    - Two new pages of story (one in #6 and 7 each) were created for and published in Batman: Dark Victory Absolute Edition (hc, 408 pages, 2012, ISBN 1-4012-3510-7)
    - A black-and-white version of the original limited series with the new pages was published as Batman Noir: Dark Victory (hc, 400 pages, 2017, ISBN 1-4012-7106-5)
  - Batman (with Jim Lee, 2002–2003) collected as:
    - Hush Volume 1 (collects #608–612, hc, 128 pages, 2003, ISBN 1-4012-0061-3; tpb, 2004, ISBN 1-4012-0060-5)
    - Hush Volume 2 (collects #613–619 and an interlude from Wizard #0, hc, 192 pages, 2004, ISBN 1-4012-0084-2; tpb, 2004, ISBN 1-4012-0092-3)
    - A two-page origin story (originally published at dccomics.com) was first printed in Batman: Hush Absolute Edition (hc, 372 pages, 2005, ISBN 1-4012-0426-0)
    - The entire 12-issue run along with the origin story and interlude in pencil form was published as Batman: Hush Unwrapped (hc, 320 pages, 2011, ISBN 1-4012-2992-1)
    - A black-and-white version of the entire 12-issue run along with the origin story and interlude was published as Batman Noir: Hush (hc, 304 pages, 2015, ISBN 1-4012-5803-4)
    - A five-page coda by Loeb and Lee, titled "Prologue: The Aftermath", was first published in Batman: Hush 20th Anniversary Edition (hc, 376 pages, 2022, ISBN 1-77951-719-X)
  - Catwoman: When in Rome #1–6 (with Tim Sale, 2004–2005) collected as Catwoman: When in Rome (hc, 160 pages, 2005, ISBN 1-4012-0432-5; tpb, 2007, ISBN 1-4012-0717-0)
    - Batman: Dark Victory #13 is collected with all reprint editions of this limited series, including Batman: Haunted Knight Absolute Edition (hc, 336 pages, 2014, ISBN 1-4012-5122-6)
    - Haunted Knight, The Long Halloween, Dark Victory and When in Rome are collected as Batman by Jeph Loeb and Tim Sale Omnibus (hc, 1,176 pages, 2018, ISBN 1-4012-8426-4)
  - Batman/The Spirit (with Darwyn Cooke, one-shot, 2006) collected in The Spirit by Darwyn Cooke Volume 1 (hc, 192 pages, 2007, ISBN 1-4012-1461-4; tpb, 2008, ISBN 1-4012-1618-8)
  - All-Star Batman and Robin, the Boy Wonder (with Jim Lee and Arthur Adams, cancelled before release because of Loeb's newly signed exclusive contract with Marvel)
  - Batman: The Long Halloween — The Last Halloween (hc, 336 pages, 2026, ISBN 1-7995-0597-9; tpb, 2026, ISBN 1-79950-598-7) collects:
    - Batman: The Long Halloween Special: "Nightmares" (with Tim Sale, 2021)
    - Batman: The Long Halloween — The Last Halloween #1–10 (with Eduardo Risso (#1), Klaus Janson (#2), Mark Chiarello (#3), Cliff Chiang (#4), Bill Sienkiewicz (#5), Enrico Marini (#6), Dave Johnson (#7), Becky Cloonan (#8), Chris Samnee (#9) and Matteo Scalera (#10), 2024–2025)
  - Batman: H2SH (hc, 176 pages, 2026, ISBN 1-79950-546-4; tpb, 2027, ISBN 1-79950-547-2) collects:
    - Justice League Unlimited #1: "The Promise" (with Jim Lee, co-feature, 2025)
    - Batman vol. 3 #158–163: "H2SH" (with Jim Lee, 2025–2026)
  - Batman/Wonder Woman: Truth (with Jim Cheung, one-shot, 2026)
- Loose Cannon:
  - Action Comics Annual #5: "Bloodlines" (with Lee Moder, 1993) collected in Superman: The Triangle Era Omnibus Volume 3 (hc, 1,520 pages, 2026, ISBN 1-7995-0876-5)
  - Justice League Task Force #9: "New Blood" (with Greg LaRocque, 1994) collected in Justice League Task Force: Purification Plague (tpb, 296 pages, 2018, ISBN 1-4012-7796-9)
  - Showcase '94 #5: "On the Other Hand..." (with Steve Skroce, anthology, 1994)
  - Loose Cannon #1–4 (with Adam Pollina, 1995)
- Superman:
  - Superman for All Seasons #1–4 (with Tim Sale, 1998) collected as Superman for All Seasons (hc, 206 pages, 1999, ISBN 1-56389-528-5; tpb, 2002, ISBN 1-56389-529-3)
  - Superman vol. 2:
    - Superman: The City of Tomorrow Volume 1 (tpb, 466 pages, 2019, ISBN 1-4012-9508-8) includes:
      - "We're Back!" (with Mike McKone, in #151–153, 1999–2000)
      - "Y2K, Part Two: Whatever Happened to the City of Tomorrow?" (with Ed McGuinness, in #154, 2000)
    - Superman: The City of Tomorrow Volume 2 (tpb, 504 pages, 2020, ISBN 1-77950-312-1) includes:
      - "Superman's Enemy Lois Lane" (with Ed McGuinness, in #155–157, 2000)
      - "Critical Condition, Part One: Little Big Man" (with Duncan Rouleau, in #158, 2000)
      - "Detour" (with Ed McGuinness and Paul Pelletier, in #159, 2000)
    - Superman: Emperor Joker (tpb, 256 pages, 2007, ISBN 1-4012-1193-3; hc, 272 pages, 2024, ISBN 1-7795-2570-2) includes:
      - "Arkham, Part One: It's a Mad, Mad, Mad World!" (with Ed McGuinness, in #160, 2000)
      - Superman: Emperor Joker (co-written by Loeb and Joe Kelly, art by various artists, one-shot, 2000)
      - "Emperor Joker, Part One: You Say You Want a Revolution?" (with Ed McGuinness, in #161, 2000)
    - Superman: President Lex (tpb, 240 pages, 2003, ISBN 1-56389-974-4) includes:
      - "Where Monsters Lurk!" (with Ed McGuinness, in #162–163, 2000)
      - "Tales from the Bizarro World" (with Ed McGuinness and Carlo Barberi, in #164, 2001)
      - President Luthor: Secret Files: "He's Coming, Mr. Lew-Thor!" (with Mike Wieringo, co-feature in one-shot, 2001)
      - Superman: Lex 2000 (with Tony Harris, Doug Mahnke, Ed McGuinness and Todd Nauck, one-shot, 2001)
      - "Help!" (with Ed McGuinness and various artists, in #165, 2001)
    - Superman: Return to Krypton (tpb, 208 pages, 2004, ISBN 1-4012-0194-6) includes:
      - "Fathers" (with Ed McGuinness, in #166, 2001)
      - "Return to Krypton, Part One: Sliding Home" (with Ed McGuinness, in #167, 2001)
    - Batman: New Gotham Volume 2 (tpb, 208 pages, 2018, ISBN 1-4012-7794-2) includes:
      - "With This Ring..." (with Ed McGuinness, in #168, 2001)
    - "Bad Dog!: A Tale of Krypto the Superdog" (with Dale Keown, in #170, 2001)
    - Superman: Our Worlds at War (tpb, 512 pages, 2006, ISBN 1-4012-1129-1) includes:
      - "Our Worlds at War" (with Ed McGuinness, in #171–173, 2001)
      - JLA: Our World at War (with Ron Garney, one-shot, 2001)
      - World's Finest: Our Worlds at War (with various artists, one-shot, 2001)
    - "Every Blade of Grass" (with Steve Lieber, in #174, 2001)
    - Superman/Doomsday (tpb, 412 pages, 2007, ISBN 1-4012-1107-0) includes:
      - "Joker's Last Laugh: Doomsday Rex" (with Ed McGuinness, in #175, 2001)
    - "A Little Help" (with Ian Churchill, in #176, 2002)
    - "Metropolis E-Mailbag" (with Ed McGuinness and Kevin Maguire, in #177, 2002)
    - "The American Way" (with Ed McGuinness, in #178, 2002)
    - "What Can One Icon Do?" (scripted by Loeb from a story by Loeb and Geoff Johns, art by Ariel Olivetti, in #179, 2002)
    - "The House of Dracula" (scripted by Loeb from a story by Loeb and Geoff Johns, art by Ian Churchill, in #180, 2002)
    - "The Mirror Crack'd" (with Ed McGuinness, in #181, 2002)
    - "The Secret" (with Ed McGuinness, in #182–183, 2002)
    - Superman: Infinite Crisis (tpb, 128 pages, 2006, ISBN 1-4012-0953-X) includes:
      - "Lois' Photo Album" (with Tim Sale, short sequence in #226, 2006)
  - Metropolis Secret Files: "Unbearable Brightness of Being" (with Jeff Matsuda, co-feature in one-shot, 2000)
  - Our Worlds at War: Secret Files: "The Eighth Day" (with Yvel Guichet, co-feature in one-shot, 2001)
    - Scripted by Loeb, plotted by Marv Wolfman.
  - Adventures of Superman #600: "Superman: The Dailies 2002 — The Daily Planet" (with Tim Sale, co-feature, 2002)
  - 9-11 Volume 2: "A Hard Day's Night" (with Carlos Pacheco, anthology graphic novel, 224 pages, 2002, ISBN 1-56389-878-0)
  - Superman/Batman (with Ed McGuinness, Pat Lee (#7), Michael Turner, Carlos Pacheco and Ian Churchill (#18), 2003–2006) collected as:
    - Volume 1 (collects #1–13, tpb, 336 pages, 2014, ISBN 1-4012-4818-7; also as Absolute Edition Volume 1, hc, 2013, ISBN 1-4012-4096-8)
      - Includes the "When Clark Met Bruce" short story (art by Tim Sale) from Superman/Batman: Secret Files & Origins 2003 (one-shot, 2003)
    - Volume 2 (collects #14–26, tpb, 336 pages, 2014, ISBN 1-4012-5079-3; also as Absolute Edition Volume 2, hc, 2014, ISBN 1-4012-4817-9)
    - Omnibus Volume 1 (includes #1–26 and short story from the Secret Files & Origins one-shot, hc, 1,208 pages, 2020, ISBN 1-77950-029-7)
  - Solo #1: "Prom Night" (with Tim Sale, anthology, 2004) collected in Solo (hc, 608 pages, 2013, ISBN 1-4012-3889-0)
  - Supergirl vol. 4 #0–5: "Power" (with Ian Churchill, 2005–2006) collected in Supergirl: The Girl of Steel (tpb, 304 pages, 2016, ISBN 1-4012-6093-4)
- The Witching Hour vol. 2 #1–3 (with Chris Bachalo, Vertigo, 1999) collected as The Witching Hour (hc, 160 pages, 2000, ISBN 1-56389-688-5; tpb, 2000, ISBN 1-56389-945-0)
  - An interview with Loeb and Bachalo, conducted by Shelly Roeberg, — "The Witching Hour Exposed" — was published in Vertigo: Winter's Edge #3 (anthology, 2000)
- Orion #8: "Tales of the New Gods: Deadend" (with Rob Liefeld, co-feature, 2001) collected in Tales of the New Gods (tpb, 168 pages, 2008, ISBN 1-4012-1637-4)
- JSA: All-Stars #2: "Same Thing Happens Every Night" (with Tim Sale, co-feature, 2003) collected in JSA: All-Stars (tpb, 208 pages, 2004, ISBN 1-4012-0219-5)
- DC Comics Presents: The Flash: "The Fastest Man -- Dead!" (with Ed McGuinness, co-feature in one-shot, 2004)

=== Marvel Comics ===
- Cable:
  - Cable (with David Brewer, Steve Skroce, Ian Churchill, Arnie Jorgensen (#21), Salvador Larroca (#24), Randy Green + Rob Haynes (#26), Wilfred Santiago (#28) and Bernard Chang (#36), 1994–1997) collected as:
    - Cable Classic Volume 3 (includes #15 and 17–20, tpb, 208 pages, 2012, ISBN 0-7851-5972-X)
    - Cable and X-Force Classic Volume 1 (includes #21–28, tpb, 344 pages, 2013, ISBN 0-7851-8432-5)
    - Cable and X-Force: Onslaught Rising (includes #29–31, tpb, 360 pages, 2018, ISBN 1-302-90949-5)
    - Cable and X-Force: Onslaught! (includes #32–39, tpb, 456 pages, 2019, ISBN 1-302-91619-X)
  - X-Man (with Steve Skroce, Phil Hester (#7), Scott McDaniel (#8) and Rob Haynes (#9); John Rozum scripted #8 and John Ostrander scripted #9 from Loeb's plots, 1995) collected as:
    - X-Men: The Age of Apocalypse Omnibus (includes #1–4, hc, 1,072 pages, 2012, ISBN 0-7851-5982-7)
      - X-Men: The Complete Age of Apocalypse Volume 2 (includes #1, tpb, 376 pages, 2006, ISBN 0-7851-1874-8)
      - X-Men: The Complete Age of Apocalypse Volume 3 (includes #2–3, tpb, 360 pages, 2006, ISBN 0-7851-2051-3)
      - X-Men: The Complete Age of Apocalypse Volume 4 (includes #4, tpb, 368 pages, 2006, ISBN 0-7851-2052-1)
    - X-Man: The Man Who Fell to Earth (includes #5–9, tpb, 320 pages, 2012, ISBN 0-7851-5981-9)
  - Askani'son #1–4 (dialogue; story by Scott Lobdell, art by Gene Ha, 1996)
    - Collected as Askani'son (tpb, 96 pages, 1997, ISBN 0-7851-0565-4)
    - Collected in X-Men: The Adventures of Cyclops and Phoenix (tpb, 352 pages, 2014, ISBN 0-7851-8833-9)
  - Prophet/Cable (with Eric Stephenson — as "editor"; written by Robert Place Napton, drawn by Mark Pajarillo and Rob Liefeld, one-shot, Maximum Press, 1997)
  - Avengers: X-Sanction #1–4 (with Ed McGuinness, 2012) collected as Avengers: X-Sanction (hc, 112 pages, 2012, ISBN 0-7851-5862-6; tpb, 2012, ISBN 0-7851-5863-4)
- Uncanny X-Men:
  - "And Nothing Will Ever be the Same" (with Tim Sale, co-feature in Annual #18, 1994) collected in X-Men: The Wedding of Cyclops and Phoenix (tpb, 408 pages, 2012, ISBN 0-7851-6290-9)
  - "Warriors of the Ebon Night" (co-written by Loeb and Scott Lobdell, art by Joe Madureira, in #329–330, 1996) collected in X-Men: The Road to Onslaught Volume 3 (tpb, 448 pages, 2015, ISBN 0-7851-9005-8)
- Generation X Annual '95 (co-written by Loeb and Scott Lobdell, art by Shawn McManus and Ashley Wood, 1995) collected in Generation X Classic Volume 2 (tpb, 248 pages, 2013, ISBN 0-7851-6686-6)
- Age of Apocalypse:
  - Astonishing X-Men #3: "In Excess" (dialogue; story by Scott Lobdell, art by Joe Madureira, 1995)
    - Collected in X-Men: The Age of Apocalypse Omnibus (hc, 1,072 pages, 2012, ISBN 0-7851-5982-7)
    - Collected in X-Men: The Complete Age of Apocalypse Volume 3 (tpb, 360 pages, 2006, ISBN 0-7851-2051-3)
  - X-Men of Apocalypse (tpb, 168 pages, 2026, ISBN 1-302-92137-1) collects:
    - Giant-Size Age of Apocalypse: "A Wrinkle in Time" (with Simone Di Meo, co-feature in one-shot, 2025)
    - X-Men of Apocalypse Alpha (with Simone Di Meo, one-shot, 2025)
    - X-Men of Apocalypse #1–4 (with Simone Di Meo, 2026)
    - X-Men of Apocalypse Omega (with Simone Di Meo, one-shot, 2026)
- X-Force (with Adam Pollina, Terry Dodson (#49), Luciano Lima (#51), Anthony Castrillo and Kevin Lau (#61), 1995–1996) collected as:
  - Cable and X-Force Classic Volume 1 (includes #44–48, tpb, 344 pages, 2013, ISBN 0-7851-8432-5)
  - Cable and X-Force: Onslaught Rising (includes #49–56 and Annual '95, tpb, 360 pages, 2018, ISBN 1-302-90949-5)
  - Cable and X-Force: Onslaught! (includes #57–61, tpb, 456 pages, 2019, ISBN 1-302-91619-X)
- Wolverine:
  - Wolverine/Gambit: Victims #1–4 (with Tim Sale, 1995) collected as Wolverine/Gambit (tpb, 96 pages, 2002, ISBN 0-7851-0896-3; hc, 112 pages, 2009, ISBN 0-7851-3802-1)
  - Wolverine:
    - "The Last Ronin" (scripted by Ralph Macchio from a plot by Loeb, drawn by Ed McGuinness, in Annual '96, 1996) collected in Wolverine: Tooth and Claw (tpb, 496 pages, 2022, ISBN 1-3029-4650-1)
    - "Evolution" (with Simone Bianchi, in vol. 3 #50–55, 2007) collected as Wolverine: Evolution (hc, 152 pages, 2007, ISBN 0-7851-2255-9; tpb, 2008, ISBN 0-7851-2256-7)
    - "Sabretooth Reborn" (with Simone Bianchi, in #310–313, 2012) collected as Wolverine: Sabretooth Reborn (hc, 112 pages, 2013, ISBN 0-7851-6325-5; tpb, 2013, ISBN 0-7851-6326-3)
- Hulk:
  - The Savage Hulk: "Dinner" (with Tim Sale, anthology one-shot, 1995) collected in The Incredible Hulk: Ghost of the Past (tpb, 480 pages, 2015, ISBN 0-7851-9299-9)
  - Hulk: Gray #1–6 (with Tim Sale, Marvel Knights, 2003–2004) collected as Hulk: Gray (hc, 160 pages, 2004, ISBN 0-7851-1314-2; tpb, 168 pages, 2011, ISBN 0-7851-1346-0)
  - Hulk (with Ed McGuinness, Frank Cho (co-feature in #7–9), Art Adams (co-feature in #7–9), Ian Churchill (#14–17) and Whilce Portacio (#18), 2008–2010) collected as:
    - Hulk by Jeph Loeb: The Complete Collection Volume 1 (collects #1–12 and The Incredible Hulk #600, tpb, 432 pages, 2013, ISBN 0-7851-8539-9)
      - Includes the King-Size Hulk one-shot (written by Loeb, art by Frank Cho, Art Adams and Herb Trimpe, 2008)
      - Includes the "Puny Little Man" short story from Wolverine vol. 3 #50 (written by Loeb, art by Ed McGuinness, 2007)
    - Hulk by Jeph Loeb: The Complete Collection Volume 2 (collects #13–24, tpb, 440 pages, 2014, ISBN 0-7851-8551-8)
      - Includes the Fall of the Hulks: Gamma one-shot (written by Loeb, art by John Romita, Jr., 2010)
    - Hulk by Jeph Loeb and Ed McGuinness Omnibus (collects #1–24, The Incredible Hulk #600, King-Size Hulk, Fall of the Hulks: Gamma and Wolverine vol. 3 #50, hc, 912 pages, 2019, ISBN 1-302-91805-2)
- Fantastic Four:
  - Fantastic Four: World's Greatest Comic Magazine #4 (scripted by Loeb from a plot by Erik Larsen and Eric Stephenson, art by Larsen, Ron Frenz, Keith Giffen and Shannon Denton, 2001)
  - Fantastic Four vol. 3 (scripted by Loeb from plots by Carlos Pacheco and Rafael Marín, art by Pacheco, Stuart Immonen (#42), Joe Bennett (#43) and Jeff Johnson, 2001–2002) collected as:
    - Fantastic Four: Heroes Return — The Complete Collection Volume 3 (includes #38–45, tpb, 456 pages, 2021, ISBN 1-302-93075-3)
    - Fantastic Four: Heroes Return — The Complete Collection Volume 4 (includes #46–50 and Annual '01, tpb, 448 pages, 2022, ISBN 1-302-94593-9)
- Daredevil: Yellow #1–6 (with Tim Sale, Marvel Knights, 2001–2002) collected as Daredevil: Yellow (hc, 160 pages, 2002, ISBN 0-7851-0840-8; tpb, 168 pages, 2011, ISBN 0-7851-0969-2)
- Spider-Man: Blue #1–6 (with Tim Sale, Marvel Knights, 2002–2003) collected as Spider-Man: Blue (hc, 160 pages, 2003, ISBN 0-7851-1062-3; tpb, 168 pages, 2011, ISBN 0-7851-1071-2)
- Stan Lee Meets Doctor Doom: "The Rest of the Story" (with Ed McGuinness, co-feature in one-shot, 2006) collected in Stan Lee Meets... (hc, 240 pages, 2007, ISBN 0-7851-2272-9)
- Captain America:
  - Fallen Son #1–5 (with Leinil Francis Yu, Ed McGuinness, John Romita, Jr., David Finch and John Cassaday, 2007) collected as Fallen Son (hc, 128 pages, 2007, ISBN 0-7851-2799-2; tpb, 2008, ISBN 0-7851-2842-5)
  - Captain America: White #0 (with Tim Sale, Marvel Knights, 2008) and 1–5 (2015–2016) collected as Captain America: White (hc, 160 pages, 2016, ISBN 0-7851-9419-3; tpb, 2016, ISBN 0-7851-3376-3)
- Nova: Origin (hc, 160 pages, 2013, ISBN 0-7851-6838-9; tpb, 2014, ISBN 0-7851-6605-X) collects:
  - Marvel Point One: "Harbinger" (with Ed McGuinness, anthology one-shot, 2012)
  - Marvel NOW! Point One: "Diamondhead" (with Ed McGuinness, anthology one-shot, 2012)
  - Nova vol. 5 #1–5 (with Ed McGuinness, 2013)
- Avengers vs. X-Men: VS (tpb, 160 pages, 2013, ISBN 0-7851-6520-7) includes:
  - AvX: VS #3: "The Thing vs. Colossus" (with Ed McGuinness, anthology, 2012)
  - AvX: VS #6: "Spider-Woman vs. X-Women (Kinda)" (with Art Adams, anthology, 2012)
- A+X #1: "The Incredible Hulk + Wolverine" (with Dale Keown, anthology, 2012) collected in A+X = Awesome (tpb, 144 pages, 2013, ISBN 0-7851-6674-2)
- Marvel Comics #1000: "The Return of Not Brand Echh" (with Tim Sale, anthology, 2019) collected in Marvel Comics 1000 (hc, 144 pages, 2020, ISBN 1-302-92137-1)
- Spider-Man/Superman: "One of Those Days" (with Jim Cheung, anthology one-shot, 2026) collected in Marvel/DC: The Dead of Knight and Other Stories (hc, 192 pages, 2026, ISBN 1-302-97024-0; tpb, 2026, ISBN 1-302-97023-2)

==== Heroes Reborn ====
- Captain America vol. 2:
  - Heroes Reborn: Captain America (tpb, 352 pages, 2006, ISBN 0-7851-2339-3) includes:
    - Heroes Reborn #½: "Faith" (scripted by Loeb from a plot by Rob Liefeld, art by Dan Fraga, 1996)
    - "Courage" (scripted by Loeb from a plot by Rob Liefeld (with Chuck Dixon credited for "assistance" in #1), art by Liefeld, in #1–6, 1996–1997)
    - "Let It be" (with Joe Bennett and Ed Benes, in #12, 1997)
- The Avengers vol. 2 #4–7 (scripted by Loeb from plots by Rob Liefeld, art by Chap Yaep and Ian Churchill, 1996–1997) collected in Heroes Reborn: The Avengers (tpb, 328 pages, 2006, ISBN 0-7851-2337-7)
- Iron Man vol. 2 #7–12 (with Whilce Portacio, Ryan Benjamin and Terry Shoemaker; issue #12 is scripted by Loeb from a plot by Jim Lee, 1997) collected in Heroes Reborn: Iron Man (tpb, 344 pages, 2006, ISBN 0-7851-2338-5)
- Onslaught Reborn #1–5 (with Rob Liefeld, 2007–2008) collected as Onslaught Reborn (hc, 136 pages, 2008, ISBN 0-7851-3134-5; tpb, 2009, ISBN 0-7851-2191-9)

==== Ultimate Comics ====
- Ultimate Wolverine (with Michael Turner, unproduced limited series — initially announced for 2007, the project was soon scrapped in favor of another, unspecified Loeb/Turner collaboration)
- Ultimate Power #7–9 (co-written by Loeb, J. Michael Straczynski and Brian Michael Bendis, art by Greg Land, 2007–2008) collected in Ultimate Power (hc, 232 pages, 2008, ISBN 0-7851-2366-0; tpb, 2008, ISBN 0-7851-2367-9)
- The Ultimates 3 #1–5: "Sex, Lies, and DVD" (with Joe Madureira, 2008) collected as The Ultimates 3: Who Killed the Scarlet Witch? (hc, 128 pages, 2009, ISBN 0-7851-3037-3; tpb, 2009, ISBN 0-7851-2269-9)
  - In 2006, Marvel announced The Ultimates 4 by Loeb and Ed McGuinness. It is unknown at which stage of completion the project was abandoned; a few sketches were published in Wizard.
- March on Ultimatum (hc, 176 pages, 2009, ISBN 0-7851-3814-5; tpb, 2008, ISBN 0-7851-3564-2) includes:
  - Ultimate Hulk Annual: "No Shoes, No Shirt, No Pants, No Service!" (with Ed McGuinness and Marko Djurdjević, 2008)
  - Ultimate Captain America Annual: "Favorite Son: Origin of the Black Panther" (with Marko Djurdjević) and "Training Day" (with Rafa Sandoval, 2008)
- Ultimatum #1–5 (with David Finch, 2009) collected as Ultimatum (hc, 144 pages, 2009, ISBN 0-7851-3434-4; tpb, 2010, ISBN 0-7851-2945-6)
- Ultimate Comics: X #1–5 (with Art Adams, 2010–2011) collected as Ultimate X: Origins (hc, 136 pages, 2011, ISBN 0-7851-4014-X; tpb, 2012, ISBN 0-7851-4101-4)
- Ultimate Comics: New Ultimates #1–5 (with Frank Cho, 2010–2011) collected as New Ultimates: Thor Reborn (hc, 120 pages, 2011, ISBN 0-7851-3994-X; tpb, 2011, ISBN 0-7851-2482-9)

=== Awesome Entertainment ===
- Fighting American (scripted by Loeb from stories by Rob Liefeld):
  - Fighting American vol. 3 #1–2 (with Rob Liefeld and Stephen Platt, 1997)
  - Fighting American: Rules of the Game #1–3 (with Ed McGuinness, 1997–1998)
  - Fighting American: Cold War (with Rob Liefeld, unreleased one-shot)
- Coven (scripted by Loeb from stories by Ian Churchill, art by Churchill):
  - Coven vol. 1 #1–6 (1997–1998)
  - Coven: Fantom (one-shot, 1998)
  - Coven: Black and White (one-shot, 1998)
    - The first two stories were colorized and reprinted as the Coven: Dark Origins one-shot (1999)
    - Third story was colorized and reprinted as Coven vol. 2 #4 on the flipside of Lionheart #2 (1999)
  - Coven vol. 2 #1–3 (1999)
  - Lionheart #1–2 (spin-off, 1999)
- Kaboom:
  - Kaboom (hc, 128 pages, Image, 2009, ISBN 1-60706-125-2; tpb, 2009, ISBN 1-60706-126-0) collects:
    - Kaboom vol. 1 #1–3 (scripted by Loeb, story and art by Jeff Matsuda, 1997)
    - Awesome Holiday Special: "Babes in Toyland" (scripted by Loeb from a story by Jeff Matsuda, art by Matsuda, anthology, 1997)
    - Kaboom Prelude: "The Beginning..." (scripted by Loeb from a story by Jeff Matsuda, art by Matsuda and Sam Liu, 1998)
  - Savage Dragon #50: "Basic Training" (scripted by Loeb from a story by Jeff Matsuda, art by Matsuda, co-feature, Highbrow Entertainment, 1998)
  - Kaboom vol. 2 #1–3: "A New Hope" (scripted by Loeb from a story by Rob Liefeld, art by Keron Grant, 1999)
- Re:Gex #1, 0 (scripted by Loeb from a story by Rob Liefeld and Eric Stephenson, art by Liefeld, 1998)
- Extreme Forces (scripted by Loeb from a story by Rob Liefeld, art by Ian Churchill, unreleased)

=== Other publishers ===
- Hip Flask #½: "Jungle to the Zoo: Ivory Towers, Part 4 of 4" (scripted by Loeb from a story by Richard Starkings, art by Ian Churchill, Active Images, 1998)
  - This 8-page short story, originally published in black-and-white, was colorized and reprinted as a feature in Elephantmen: The Pilot (one-shot, Image, 2007)
  - The colorized version was subsequently collected in Elephantmen: Fatal Diseases (hc, 312 pages, 2009, ISBN 1-60706-088-4; tpb, 2010, ISBN 1-60706-177-5)
- The Darkness/Batman (co-written by Loeb and Scott Lobdell, art by Marc Silvestri, David Finch and Clarence Lansang, graphic novel, 48 pages, Top Cow, 1999, ISBN 1-58240-098-9)
- Vampirella Monthly #18: "Looking for Mr. Goodwin" (with Tim Sale, Harris, 1999) collected in Vampirella Masters Series Volume 4: Visionaries (tpb, 144 pages, Dynamite, 2011, ISBN 1-60690-209-1)
- Dark Horse:
  - 9-11 Volume 1: "Please Stand by..." (with J. Scott Campbell, anthology graphic novel, 196 pages, 2002, ISBN 1-56389-881-0)
  - Buffy the Vampire Slayer Season Eight #20 (with Georges Jeanty, Eric Wight and Ethen Beavers, 2008) collected in Buffy the Vampire Slayer Season Eight Volume 2 (hc, 320 pages, 2012, ISBN 1-59582-935-0)
- Michael Turner's Soulfire Preview, Beginnings, #0–4 (with Michael Turner, Aspen MLT, 2003–2005) collected as Michael Turner's Soulfire (hc, 160 pages, 2006, ISBN 0-9774821-0-3; tpb, 2008, ISBN 0-9774821-2-X)
  - Issues #3–4 are scripted by J. T. Krul from Loeb and Turner's plots.
- Smash Unleashed! (with Rob Liefeld, unreleased one-shot intended for publication by Image, solicited for 2009)

== Screenwriting ==
=== Television ===
- The Hitchhiker (1984)
- Seven Little Monsters (2000–2001)
- Buffy: The Animated Series (2002)
- Smallville (2002–2005)
- Heroes (2006–2008)
- Teen Wolf (2011)

=== Films ===
- Teen Wolf (1985)
- Commando (1985)
- Burglar (1987)
- Teen Wolf Too (1987)

== Producer ==
=== Television ===
- Seven Little Monsters (2000)
- Buffy: The Animated Series (2002)
- Smallville (2002–2005)
- Lost (2006)
- Heroes (2006–2009)
- Thor & Loki: Blood Brothers (2011)
- Iron Man: Armored Adventures (2011–2012)
- The Avengers: Earth's Mightiest Heroes (2012)
- Ultimate Spider-Man (2012–2016)
- Avengers Assemble (2012–2018)
- Hulk and the Agents of S.M.A.S.H. (2013–2015)
- Agents of S.H.I.E.L.D. (2013–2020)
- Agent Carter (2015–2016)
- Guardians of the Galaxy (2015–2017)
- Daredevil (2015–2018)
- Jessica Jones (2015–2019)
- Marvel's Most Wanted (2016)
- Agents of S.H.I.E.L.D.: Slingshot (2016)
- Luke Cage (2016–2018)
- The Defenders (2017)
- Spider-Man (2017)
- Inhumans (2017)
- New Warriors (2017)
- Iron Fist (2017–2018)
- The Punisher (2017–2019)
- The Gifted (2017–2019)
- Legion (2017–2019)
- Runaways (2017–2019)
- Cloak & Dagger (2018–2019)
- Helstrom (2020)
- M.O.D.O.K. (2021)
- Hit-Monkey (2021–2024)

=== Films ===
- Teen Wolf (1985)
- Commando (1985)
- Burglar (1987)
- Model by Day (1994)
- Firestorm (1998)
- Heroes United (2013–2014)
- Lego Marvel Super Heroes: Heroes Reassembled (2015)
- Marvel Super Heroes Adventures: Frost Fight! (2015)
- Hulk: Where Monsters Dwell (2016)

Preceded by Glenn Herdling	Cable writer 1994–1997	Succeeded by Todd Dezago
Preceded by n/a	X-Man writer 1995	Succeeded by John Ostrander
Preceded by Fabian Nicieza	X-Force writer 1995–1997	Succeeded by John Francis Moore
Preceded by Mark Waid	Captain America writer 1996–1997 (with Rob Liefeld)	Succeeded by James Robinson
Preceded by Scott Lobdell	Iron Man writer 1997	Succeeded by Kurt Busiek
Preceded by Dan Jurgens	Superman writer 1999–2002	Succeeded by Geoff Johns
Preceded by Carlos Pacheco; Rafael Marín	Fantastic Four writer 2001–2002 (with Carlos Pacheco and Rafael Marín)	Succeeded by Carlos Pacheco; Rafael Marín; Karl Kesel
Preceded by Ed Brubaker	Batman writer 2002–2003	Succeeded by Brian Azzarello
Preceded by Peter David	Supergirl writer 2005–2006	Succeeded by Joe Kelly
Preceded by Marc Guggenheim	Wolverine writer 2007	Succeeded by Marc Guggenheim
Preceded by Mark Millar	The Ultimates writer 2008–2011	Succeeded by Jonathan Hickman (Ultimate Comics: The Ultimates)
Preceded by Greg Pak (The Incredible Hulk)	Hulk writer 2008–2010	Succeeded by Jeff Parker
Preceded by Aron Eli Coleite (Ultimate X-Men)	Ultimate Comics: X writer 2010–2011	Succeeded by Nick Spencer (Ultimate Comics: X-Men)
Preceded by Cullen Bunn	Wolverine writer 2012	Succeeded by Cullen Bunn
Preceded by Dan Abnett; Andy Lanning (Nova vol. 4)	Nova writer 2013	Succeeded by Zeb Wells
