= Marvel Knights =

Imprint of Marvel Comics

- Logo
- Parent company: Marvel Comics
- Status: Active
- Founded: September 16, 1998; 27 years ago
- Country of origin: United States
- Headquarters location: New York City
- Key people: Joe Quesada; Jimmy Palmiotti
- Publication types: Comic books
- Owner: Marvel Comics

Marvel Knights is an imprint of Marvel Comics that contained standalone material taking place inside the Marvel Universe (Earth-616). The imprint originated in 1998 when Marvel outsourced four titles (Black Panther, Punisher, Daredevil and Inhumans) to Joe Quesada and Jimmy Palmiotti's company Event Comics; Event hired the creative teams for the Knights line while Marvel published them.

== History ==
In 1998, Marvel Comics, which had just filed for Chapter 11 bankruptcy, asked Quesada and Palmiotti to work for Marvel in a more exclusive capacity, and contracted them and their Event Comics partners to produce a line of Marvel books dubbed Marvel Knights. As editors of Marvel Knights, Quesada and Palmiotti worked on a number of low-profile characters such as Daredevil, Punisher, The Inhumans and Black Panther, encouraging experimentation and using their contacts in the independent comics world to bring in creators such as David W. Mack, Mike Oeming, Brian Michael Bendis, Garth Ennis and Steve Dillon. Quesada himself also illustrated a Daredevil story written by film director Kevin Smith with Palmiotti inking the title book.

Marvel Knights stepped away from the long-running story arcs and heavy focus on continuity that was a prime feature of Marvel Comics during this period; instead, the imprint focused on strong stand-alone stories and high production qualities.

In addition to the headlining Daredevil title with Smith/Quesada/Palmiotti, the line also featured initial release titles of Punisher (from Christopher Golden, Bernie Wrightson and Jimmy Palmiotti); the Inhumans (Paul Jenkins, Jae Lee and Jose Villarrubia) and Black Panther (Christopher Priest and Mark Texeria). Several of these titles laid the ground work for several Marvel TV and movie story ideas and concepts. The title went on to feature Black Widow, new Punisher titles, the Sentry and several more events.

In 2000, two-and-a-half years after starting Marvel Knights — and in large part due to the imprint's success — Quesada was named editor-in-chief of Marvel Comics. Palmiotti remained involved in some of the titles for a limited period either inking or editing before leaving.

In early 2006 Quesada announced that all ongoing titles under the "Marvel Knights" banner would move to the Marvel Universe imprint and that "Marvel Knights" would afterward contain high-profile limited series. Quesada explained that Marvel Knights...

is the showcase for "evergreen events" — self-contained limited series that think outside the box, that challenge readers to re-think their favorite Marvel characters and re-evaluate the legends that surround them. In other words, Marvel Knights will be a place for top talent to work without constraints, and deliver the kind of product fans deserve!

The change began with Daredevil #82, Black Panther #14, Moon Knight #1, Squadron Supreme #1, and Wolverine #42. Marvel Knights Spider-Man became The Sensational Spider-Man with issue #23, and Marvel Knights 4 (featuring the Fantastic Four) became simply 4 with issue #28.

Fury: Peacemaker, by Garth Ennis and Darick Robertson, was the first limited series to launch under the redefined imprint in February 2006. This was followed by Silver Surfer: Requiem by J. Michael Straczynski and Esad Ribić (2007), Spider-Man: Reign by Kaare Andrews (late 2006), Ghost Rider by Garth Ennis and Clayton Crain (2007), and Captain America: The Chosen (September 2007).

Marvel Knights editor Axel Alonso wrote in a press release:

These stand alone stories won't just challenge readers to re-think their favorite Marvel legends. . . . Oftentimes, we'll focus on characters that are off the beaten path — boiling these archetypes down to their cores. We want to build on the tradition of limited series like Ennis and Crain's Ghost Rider, Frank Cho's Shanna, the She-Devil and Robert Rodi and Ribić's Loki — each of which offered very distinct visions for Marvel characters, and each of which — judging by sales numbers — were embraced by fandom.

Marvel Knights became dormant after 2013. However, a six issue limited anniversary run entitled Marvel Knights 20th was started in 2018 and ran into 2019.

In March 2025, it was announced that a new miniseries entitled Marvel Knights: The World to Come would begin publication in June that same year. The series, written by Christopher Priest and illustrated by Quesada, is set in a hypothetical future of the Marvel Universe following the aftermath of T'Challa's death.

== Team ==
The Marvel Knights team was a name given to Daredevil's unnamed superhero team. Besides Daredevil, the line-up consisted of Black Widow, Cloak and Dagger, Morbius, Elektra, Blade, Ghost Rider, The Punisher, Moon Knight, Shang-Chi, Black Knight and Luke Cage.

== Ongoing series ==
- Black Panther (vol. 3) #1–12 (November 1998 – October 1999)
- Daredevil (vol. 2) #1–81 (November 1998 – March 2006)
- Inhumans (vol. 2) #1–12 (November 1998 – October 1999)
- Marvel Knights #1–15 (June 2000 – September 2001)
- The Punisher (vol. 5) #1–37 (August 2001 – February 2004)
- Elektra (vol. 2) #1–22 (September 2001 – June 2003)
- Marvel Knights (vol. 2) #1–6 (May 2002 – October 2002)
- Captain America (vol. 4) #1–28 (June 2002 – August 2004)
- Marvel Knights 4 #1–27 (April 2004 – April 2006)
- The Incredible Hulk (vol. 2) #70–76 (June 2004 – October 2004)
- Marvel Knights Spider-Man #1–22 (June 2004 – March 2006)
- Wolverine (vol. 3) #13–39 (June 2004 – April 2006)
- X-Statix #21–26 (June 2004 – October 2004)
- District X #1–14 (July 2004 – August 2005)
- Black Panther (vol. 4) #1–13 (April 2005 – April 2006)

== Limited series ==
- The Punisher (1998 4-issue limited series)
- Black Widow (1999 3-issue limited series)
- Doctor Strange: The Flight of Bones (1999 4-issue limited series)
- Wolverine/Punisher Revelation (1999 4-issue limited series)
- Daredevil: Ninja (2000 3-issue limited series)
- Marvel Boy (2000 6-issue limited series)
- The Punisher (2000 12-issue limited series)
- Sentry (2000 5-issue limited series)
- Black Widow (2001 3-issue limited series)
- Daredevil: Yellow (2001 6-issue limited series)
- Daredevil/Spider-Man (2001 4-issue limited series)
- Fantastic Four: 1234 (2001 4-issue limited series)
- Ghost Rider: The Hammer Lane (2001 6-issue limited series, plus a Wizard #1/2 issue)
- Hulk Smash (2001 2-issue limited series)
- Elektra: Glimpse & Echo (2002 4-issue limited series)
- Marvel Knights Double-Shot (2002 4-issue limited series)
- Spider-Man: Blue (2002 6-issue limited series)
- Wolverine/Hulk (2002 4-issue limited series)
- Hulk: Gray (2003 6-issue limited series)
- Marvel 1602 (2003 8-issue limited series)
- Spider-Man & Wolverine (2003 4-issue limited series)
- Black Widow (2004 6-issue limited series)
- Bullseye: Greatest Hits (2004 5-issue limited series)
- Daredevil: Father (2004 6-issue limited series)
- Hulk & Thing: Hard Knocks (2004 4-issue limited series)
- Madrox (2004 5-issue limited series)
- Man-Thing (2004 3-issue limited series)
- Strange (2004 6-issue limited series)
- Wolverine/Punisher (2004 5-issue limited series)
- Black Widow: The Things They Say About Her (2005 6-issue limited series)
- Daredevil: Redemption (2005 6-issue limited series)
- Daredevil vs Punisher: Means and Ends (2005 6-issue limited series)
- Ghost Rider: The Road to Damnation (2005 6-issue limited series)
- Shanna the She-Devil (2005 7-issue limited series)
- Claws (2006 3-issue limited series)
- Fury: Peacemaker (2006 6-issue limited series)
- Punisher vs. Bullseye (2006 5-issue limited series)
- X-Statix Presents: Dead Girl (2006 5-issue limited series)
- Captain America: The Chosen (2007 6-issue limited series)
- Daredevil: Battlin' Jack Murdock (2007 4-issue limited series)
- Silver Surfer: Requiem (2007 4-issue limited series)
- Spider-Man: Reign (2007 4-issue limited series)
- Iron Man: Viva Las Vegas (2008; 2 issues published of an intended limited series)
- Sub-Mariner: The Depths (2008 5-issue limited series)
- Spider-Man: With Great Power (2008 5-issue limited series)
- Angel: Revelations (2008 5-issue limited series)
- Logan (2008 3-issue limited series)
- X-Men: Magneto Testament (2008 5-issue limited series)
- Punisher: War Zone (2009 6-issue limited series)
- Strange Tales (2009 3-issue limited series)
- Strange Tales II (2010; only issues 2 & 3 of this 3-issue limited series are MK, issue 1 was published under the Max label)
- Captain America/Black Panther: Flags of Our Fathers (2010 4-issue limited series)
- Deadpool: Wade Wilson's War (2010 4-issue limited series)
- Deathlok (2010 7-issue limited series)
- Spider-Man: Fever (2010 3-issue limited series)
- Thor: For Asgard (2010 6-issue limited series)
- Bullseye: Perfect Game (2011 2-issue limited series)
- Iron Man: Rapture (2011; 4-issue limited series)
- Marvel Knights: Hulk (2013 4-issue limited series)
- Marvel Knights: Spider-Man (2013 5-issue limited series)
- Marvel Knights: X-Men (2013 5-issue limited series)
- Marvel Knights 20th (2019 6-issue limited series)

== One-shots ==
- Ant-Man's Big Christmas (2000 one-shot)
- Killraven (2001 one-shot)
- Punisher/Painkiller Jane (2001 one-shot)
- Sentry versus The Void (2001 one-shot)
- Sentry/Fantastic Four (2001 one-shot)
- Sentry/Hulk (2001 one-shot)
- Sentry/Spider-Man (2001 one-shot)
- Sentry/X-Men (2001 one-shot)
- Spider-Man/Daredevil (2002 one-shot)
- Daredevil/Bullseye: The Target (2003; 1 issue published of an intended limited series)
- Punisher: Red X-Mas (2004 one-shot)
- Punisher: Bloody Valentine (2006 one-shot)
- Punisher: Silent Night (2006 one-shot)
- Captain America: White (2008; 1 issue published of an intended limited series; finally finished in 2015, but not under the Marvel Knights banner)

== Other versions ==
=== Marvel Knights 2099 ===
Cover to Marvel Knights 2099: Daredevil

In 2004, Marvel Comics held a fifth-week event called "Marvel Knights 2099", which took place in the future on an alternate world (Earth-2992) that was not identical to the alternate Marvel Universe on Earth-928 featured in the 1990s Marvel 2099 books.

- Daredevil 2099 #1
- Black Panther 2099 #1
- Inhumans 2099 #1
- Punisher 2099 #1
- Mutant 2099 #1

=== Ultimate Marvel ===
The Ultimate Marvel version of the Marvel Knights team made its debut in Ultimate Spider-Man #106 in the arc called "Warriors". The members of the Ultimate Marvel version of the Marvel Knights include Daredevil, Doctor Strange, Shang-Chi, Iron Fist, Moon Knight, and Spider-Man.

After Shang-Chi made an unsuccessful attack on the Kingpin, he was recruited by Daredevil to help bring down the Kingpin for good. Later, Daredevil, as Matt Murdock, met Spider-Man and asked him to join the group, with the plan of killing the Kingpin. Spider-Man objected to killing, and the group agreed to let Moon Knight, under the persona of Ronin join the Kingpin's employ. Ronin forcibly brought Spider-Man to the Kingpin as a captive. The Kingpin ties him up, unmasks him and tortures him and mocks him for being a teenager. After revealing that he knew that Ronin was Moon Knight, Kingpin had him beaten nearly to death, and let Spider-Man leave with the knowledge that one of the Knights was a traitor.

After a bomb destroyed the law offices of Matt Murdock, Iron Fist was revealed as the traitor, though only because Kingpin threatened his daughter. Iron Fist was sent back to Kingpin to distract him while Daredevil tried to kill his comatose wife. After a standoff between Daredevil, Kingpin, and Spider-Man, Kingpin agreed to leave the country in exchange for his wife's safety, but he secretly and furiously plotted to have Daredevil killed, Dr. Strange's hands broken, and Spider-Man's school blown up. Meanwhile, Moon Knight went to the police, revealed his secret identity, and said that Kingpin tried to kill him, which gave the police enough to arrest Kingpin on attempted murder charges. At the end of the arc there were brief images of the team going their separate ways: Shang-Chi caught a train out of town, Iron Fist returned to his daughter, Dr. Strange went back to his sanctum, and Daredevil berated himself at a church.

== In other media ==
=== Film ===
Marvel Knights was also the name of a production arm of Marvel Entertainment intended to be used to produce some of Marvel's darker and lesser-known titles: Punisher: War Zone and Ghost Rider: Spirit of Vengeance were the only two films released under the Marvel Knights banner.

The Marvel Knights books have had several influences on Marvel Cinematic Universe movies and TV shows. From the Netflix Marvel TV shows to the 2018 Black Panther film, the characters they created have been noted as coming directly from the comics. Christopher Priest credited the Dora Milaje to both Joe Quesada and Jimmy Palmiotti.

=== Video games ===
- The team appears in Marvel: Ultimate Alliance series, excluding the second game:
  - In the Marvel: Ultimate Alliance video game, Marvel Knights is a team bonus granted if you have any combination of the following characters on your team: Black Panther, Daredevil, Doctor Strange, Wolverine, Luke Cage, Spider-Man, Elektra Natchios and Moon Knight.
  - In the video game Marvel Ultimate Alliance 3: The Black Order, the current members of Marvel Knights consist those who are also the members of either Defenders, Midnight Sons or both. The initial playable characters consist Hulk, Daredevil, Elektra Natchios, Luke Cage, Iron Fist, Loki Laufeyson, Doctor Strange, Elsa Bloodstone and Ghost Rider (Johnny Blaze); while Defenders Valkyrie (Brunnhilde) and Jessica Jones serves as non-playable allies of the group. The DLC pass adds additional Marvel Knights Punisher, Blade, Moon Knight and Michael Morbius.

=== Animation ===
In 2010, Shout! Factory and Marvel Comics teamed up to release a roster of motion comic animated series on DVD. The following titles have been released thus far:

1. Astonishing X-Men: Gifted (September 28, 2010)
2. Iron Man: Extremis (November 30, 2010)
3. Black Panther (January 18, 2011)
4. Spider-Woman: Agent of S.W.O.R.D. (June 14, 2011)
5. Thor & Loki: Blood Brothers (September 13, 2011)
6. Astonishing X-Men: Dangerous (April 10, 2012)
7. Astonishing X-Men: Torn (August 14, 2012)
8. Astonishing X-Men: Unstoppable (November 13, 2012)
9. Inhumans (April 23, 2013)
10. Wolverine: Origin (July 9, 2013)
11. Ultimate Wolverine Vs. Hulk (September 10, 2013)
12. Wolverine versus Sabretooth (January 7, 2014)
13. Wolverine Weapon X: Tomorrow Dies Today (May 13, 2014)
14. Eternals (September 16, 2014)
15. Wolverine versus Sabretooth: Reborn (March 24, 2015)

== See also ==
- List of limited series
- MAX Comics, an adults-only R-rated imprint of Marvel Comics similar to Marvel Knights
