= The Kid Who Collects Spider-Man =

Comic Story by Roger Stern

- Cover of The Amazing Spider-Man vol. 1, 248 (Jan 1984), art by John Romita, Jr.
- Publisher: Marvel Comics
- Publication date: January 1984
- Genre: Superhero
- Title(s): The Amazing Spider-Man #248
- Main character: Spider-Man

Creative team
- Writer: Roger Stern
- Penciller: Ron Frenz
- Inker: Terry Austin
- Letterer: Joe Rosen
- Colorist: Christie Scheele
- The Very Best of Spider-Man: ISBN 0-7851-0045-8

"The Kid Who Collects Spider-Man" is a Spider-Man story written by Roger Stern, originally published in The Amazing Spider-Man #248 in 1984. In the story, a young fan of Spider-Man meets his hero.

This comic was selected as one of the "Top 10 Spider-Man stories of all time" by Wizard and is regarded as among the most-loved Spider-Man stories. The story has been adapted into the episode "Make a Wish" in Spider-Man: The Animated Series, and in the fan film Spider-Man Lotus.

== Plot ==
Young Timothy "Tim" Harrison lies in his bed. Portions from a column by Daily Bugle writer Jacob Conover say Tim is the greatest Spider-Man fan in the world and has collected every article available on him, including a whole album of The Daily Bugle's retractions. Tim has also collected mementos such as kinescopes of Spider-Man's early television appearances and bullets from a crime foiled by Spider-Man. Suddenly, Spider-Man comes into Tim's room. In the following hours, the two trade anecdotes about Spider-Man's long career. The hero is surprised and touched by how much the boy adores him.

When Spider-Man is about to leave, Tim asks him who he really is. After some hesitation, Spider-Man takes off his mask, identifies himself as Peter Parker, and retells the fateful night when his negligence let Uncle Ben die, causing him to fight crime. The story does not change Tim's admiration of his hero. A tearful Peter Parker embraces Tim (who refers to him as "Pete") and departs. An exterior view reveals Tim is staying in a cancer clinic. The last of the newspaper captions states that the boy's only wish is to meet his hero in person. Conover ends his report by stating his hope that "Spider-Man takes the time to visit a very brave young man named Tim Harrison, and I hope he does it soon. You see, Tim Harrison has leukemia, and the doctors only give him a few more weeks to live".

=== Background ===
The lead story of Amazing #248 is Spider-Man's fight against Thunderball, but Stern's backup story is remembered much better than the main tale. According to Stern:

Partly, I'm sure that it sprang from a desire on my part to do a short human-interest story in the style of Will Eisner - that's why the story is partially advanced through newspaper clippings... I was trying to be Eisneresque.

Tim Harrison's death is mentioned in Danny Fingeroth and Ron Garney's "A Spider-Man Carol", in which Spider-Man meets Tim's brother Joey. The story was published in the 1991 Marvel Holiday Special.

== Collected editions ==
The story has been reprinted several times and collected in various trade paperbacks including The Very Best of Spider-Man (December 1994, ISBN 0-7851-0045-8).

== In other media ==
- The story served as the partial basis for the Spider-Man: The Animated Series two-part story "Make a Wish" / "Attack of the Octobot".
- The story, along with Spider-Man: Blue, served as the basis of the 2023 live-action fan film Spider-Man: Lotus. However, this adaptation was widely criticized for its writing and overly dramatic tone.
