= Superman for All Seasons =

1998 comic book limited series by Jeph Loeb and Tim Sale

- Cover to Superman for All Seasons #1, art by Tim Sale.

Publication information
- Publisher: DC Comics
- Schedule: Monthly
- Format: Limited series
- Genre: Superhero
- Publication date: September – December 1998
- No. of issues: 4
- Main character(s): Superman; Lois Lane; Lana Lang; Lex Luthor

Creative team
- Written by: Jeph Loeb
- Artist: Tim Sale
- Letterer: Richard Starkings
- Colorist: Bjarne Hansen
- Editor: Joey Cavalieri

Collected editions
- Hardcover: ISBN 1-56389-528-5

Superman for All Seasons is a 4-issue comic book limited series written by Jeph Loeb with art by Tim Sale. It was originally published by DC Comics in 1998, after their previous success, Batman: The Long Halloween. After that story's theme was holidays, this one's theme dealt with seasons. The artwork contains many influences from that of Norman Rockwell. The story also parallels the events from Superman's then-origin story John Byrne's The Man of Steel, though it can be read on its own.

== Publication history ==
Superman For All Seasons was conceived, like all of the Jeph Loeb/Tim Sale books from DC Comics and rival Marvel Comics, as a stand-alone, self-contained story that gave a sense of the character of Superman and his supporting cast. The title is not an origin story, but it picks up on who the character is and how he came to be.

As explained by Loeb, one of the things that he wanted to capture was the grandeur that is Superman, and that was to have double-page spreads with big sky shots. Sale and Bjarne Hansen were on the art and colors, and everyone was speechless once Loeb saw the pages, and when those same pages came in the DC office. One of the most powerful examples of this artistic choice is near the end of the first issue, featuring a double-page spread of Clark Kent and Pa Kent looking out at a radiant Kansas sunset from their farm as Clark prepares to leave home for Metropolis.

The key element to the series was the narration. Originally, Loeb never intended to have a narrator, but he did not want to do the story from Superman's point of view. He explained that he didn't feel comfortable being inside the head of an icon. It was decided to allow other characters to narrate and give their individual points of view on Superman, with one narrator per volume. Pa Kent gives his life as a father to a super-powered son. While not knowing what lay ahead of Clark, he has confidence that his son would be all right. This, in turn, came from Loeb himself as the father to his son, Sam Loeb. Narration by Lois Lane represents the impact of Superman's presence in Metropolis and comments on Superman as an idea. Lex Luthor explains how his rivalry with Superman is like a love story between him and Metropolis, and Lana Lang helps Clark reconcile his two identities as mild-mannered reporter and Superman.

== Plot synopsis ==
=== Spring ===
Narrated by Jonathan Kent, he thinks back on his son Clark's roots as a farm boy in Smallville, Kansas. At the end of Clark's last year in high school, Jonathan tells him that he and his wife Martha found him in an alien rocket when he was an infant, raising him as their son, and that he can do things "other boys can't". Clark overhears his parents discuss their uncertainty about his future, and struggles with his growing powers. When a tornado strikes the town, Clark discovers he can fly and rescues a neighbor, but wonders if he could have done more. After graduation, Clark reveals his powers and his desire to use them to help people to his best friend Lana Lang, who urges him to leave Smallville. Clark says goodbye to his parents and leaves for Metropolis, becoming a reporter at the Daily Planet with a crush on rival Lois Lane, and donning a costume his mother made him to do some good.

=== Summer ===
Narrated by Lois Lane, she muses that her rules as a journalist have been disrupted by the arrival of the costumed hero she dubs "Superman", unaware he is her colleague Clark. Superman saves the city from a nuclear missile and rescues Lois from the rogue submarine responsible, delivering the terrorists to the authorities and confronting billionaire Lex Luthor for his involvement. Lois finds herself intrigued by Superman. Clark returns to Smallville to visit his parents and friend Pete Ross, and learns Lana has left to travel the world; he feels out of place in the city and sad that his home has changed, but Martha assures him he will find his way. Back in Metropolis, Luthor's exosuit-powered "Guardians of the City" respond to a fire at Chemco Labs. Superman arrives and saves a scientist, Jenny Vaughn, trapped inside, before single-handedly dousing the fire. Luthor later meets with Vaughn, who has become obsessed with Superman, for his own plans.

=== Fall ===
Narrated by Lex Luthor, he considers his control of Metropolis "a love story… between a man and a city". After spending a night in jail, Luthor plans revenge on Superman; he brainwashes Vaughn with images of Superman, declaring her biochemical expertise will prove useful. At the Daily Planet, Clark watches helplessly as Lois and everyone in the building falls unconscious. As Superman, he races through Metropolis to find the entire city afflicted, and stops a runaway train. At S.T.A.R. Labs, Professor Crosby informs Superman the city has been struck by a mysterious airborne virus. He confronts Luthor, quarantined in his skyscraper, and is forced to ask for his help. Luthor presents Vaughn, transformed into "Toxin"; she and Superman seed the clouds above Metropolis with chemicals and the antidote rains down, curing the city, but Toxin succumbs from overexposure to the virus and dies in Superman's arms when they return to LexCorp. Luthor convinces Superman that he is not enough to save everyone, and Clark returns to Smallville.

=== Winter ===
Narrated by Lana Lang, she reveals that she was in love with Clark, but the revelation of his powers and his departure to help the world ended her dreams of a life with him. In Metropolis, Luthor regains his power over the city, and Lois ponders the disappearance of Superman and Clark's absence. In Smallville, Clark reunites with Lana and Pete, who chastises them for having ended up back home. Lana has dinner with the Kents when news comes of a flood. With Lana's blessing, Clark sets out as Superman to rescue the town, damming the flood. Lana and the Kents are swept away, but Superman arrives in the nick of time. He returns to Metropolis, infuriating Lois with a front-page story and Luthor with Superman's reappearance, as Lana finds peace with a new life in Smallville.

== Collected editions ==
The series has been collected into an individual volume:

- Superman for All Seasons (206 pages, hardcover, ISBN 1-56389-528-5, softcover, ISBN 1-56389-529-3)

== Reception ==
Superman For All Seasons was highly praised by fans and critics. Readers found that it was the themes and messages from the writing and art that really hit home. Some examples include its use of metaphor to illustrate the coming of age, the end of childhood and the acceptance of your place in the world. It was voted the third best foreign comic book published in Japan in the Gaiman Award.

== Continuations ==
The Clark Kent/Superman from For All Seasons has reappeared three times since the series ended, all in other Loeb/Sale stories. First, in a short story from Superman/Batman: Secret Files & Origins 2003 (Nov. 2003) titled "When Clark Met Bruce", depicting the first meeting of Bruce Wayne and Clark Kent as young boys in Smallville. Solo #1 (Dec. 2004) featured "Prom Night" which depicted Clark picking up Lana Lang as his prom date. Finally, a short story in Superman/Batman #26 (June 2006) titled "Sam's Story", Superman recounts his friend from high school who died of cancer when he was very young. The "Sam" character is based on Jeph Loeb's son, Sam, who died from the same illness. Those stories were included in the 2023 hardcover and paperback editions published after Tim Sale's passing.

== In other media ==
- The mini-series was the inspiration for the television series Smallville (2001–2011). Jeph Loeb served as a writer and executive producer on the show.
- The mini-series serves as an inspiration for the DC Universe (DCU) film Superman (2025).
