= Captain America: White =

Comic book series

- Cover of the collected edition

Publication information
- Publisher: Marvel Comics
- Schedule: Irregular
- Format: Limited series
- Genre: Superhero
- Publication date: July 2008; September – December 2015
- No. of issues: 6
- Main character(s): Captain America; Bucky Barnes

Creative team
- Written by: Jeph Loeb
- Artist(s): Tim Sale
- Letterer(s): Richard Starkings; Comicraft
- Colorist(s): Dave Stewart
- Editor(s): Richard Starkings; Jon Moisan; Mark Paniccia

Collected editions
- Captain America: White — Deluxe Hardcover: ISBN 978-0785194194
- Captain America: White — Paperback: ISBN 978-0785133766
- Marvel Knights: Jeff Loeb & Tim Sale: Yellow, Blue, Gray & White Omnibus: ISBN 978-1302914059

Captain America: White is a six-issue Marvel Comics limited series written by Jeph Loeb and illustrated by Tim Sale. An homage to Captain America comics from the Golden Age of Comic Books, the series focuses on the relationship between Steve Rogers / Captain America and his sidekick Bucky. It is the fourth and final comic in Loeb's and Sale's "Color" series, following Daredevil: Yellow, Spider-Man: Blue, and Hulk: Gray. The series is noted for its extensive production delays, with seven years elapsing between the release of the first and second issues.

== Plot ==
White is narrated by Steve Rogers as he recounts a mission with his partner James Buchanan "Bucky" Barnes during World War II.

While in basic training at Fort Leigh, Virginia, Barnes discovers that Rogers is Captain America after walking in on Rogers changing into his costume. Rogers trains Barnes as his sidekick, who takes a diminutive of his middle name – "Bucky" – as his alias. They are deployed to North Africa in December 1941, where they extract Nick Fury and the Howling Commandos before being shipped to Europe. While en route, their plane is shot down over the Atlantic Ocean. Barnes saves Rogers from drowning by detaching Rogers' shield and allowing it to sink to the bottom of the ocean; the shield is later recovered and returned to Rogers by Namor of the Invaders.

Rogers, Barnes, Fury and the Commandos make landfall in Occupied France, where they repel a Nazi military unit and join with Fury's allies in the French Resistance. They proceed to Paris to confront Red Skull, seeking to thwart his plan to raid and destroy the Louvre. Believing Rogers has lost faith in him after losing his shield, Barnes secretly leaves to confront Red Skull alone. Upon learning of Barnes' plan, Rogers abandons the Louvre mission to confront Red Skull at his base in a zeppelin circling the Eiffel Tower. Red Skull, who has captured Barnes, issues Rogers an ultimatum: save the Eiffel Tower and its surrounding environs, which he has armed with explosives, or save Barnes. Rogers chooses to rescue Barnes, unintentionally destroying the zeppelin and Red Skull's detonator in the process, and escapes to safety with Barnes.

Many years later, shortly after having been rescued from suspended animation by the Avengers, (Note: As depicted in The Avengers #4 (cover-dated March 1964)) Rogers is visited by Fury. They travel to Rogers' and Barnes' graves at Arlington National Cemetery, which are marked with statues of the two men. Rogers destroys his own statue with his shield, and laments Barnes' death.

== Background and creation ==
=== Development ===
White is the fourth comic in Loeb and Sale's Color series, following Daredevil: Yellow, Spider-Man: Blue, and Hulk: Gray. Comics in the series broadly focus on the formative years of a given character, as juxtaposed against a personal loss they have suffered. Loeb had conceived of a story about Rogers' grief over Barnes' death prior to the publication of The Winter Soldier, the 2005 run of issues in Captain America (Volume 5) that revealed that Barnes was still alive. Consequently, Loeb set the non-WWII portions of the comic in a period of continuity prior to the events of The Winter Soldier.

Sale illustrated White using a mix of charcoal and ink wash, drawing inspiration for the look of the series from Two-Fisted Tales by Harvey Kurtzman and William Gaines, Foxhole by Jack Kirby, and the political cartoons of Bill Mauldin. Sale expressed a desire to maintain a high level of historical accuracy in early interviews about the series, but later commented that maintaining strict historical accuracy "drove [him] crazy for a while" and caused him to shift priorities for the series' art.

=== Release and delays ===
White was announced in March 2008 at Wizard World Los Angeles. Issue #0 was published on July 9, 2008, making White one of the first Marvel Comics titles to be authored by Loeb following a period of exclusivity with DC Comics. #0 was published under the Marvel Knights imprint, though subsequent issues would be published with the generic Marvel trade dress.

The series subsequently languished in development hell due to Loeb's involvement with Marvel Television and Sale's scarce availability for sequential comic work. While the majority of the series' art was completed in 2008, scripting would not be completed until 2011. In a 2009 panel at Long Beach Comic Con, Loeb stated that the comic was further delayed by his and Sale's desire to complete all six issues before going to print. Unsuccessful attempts were made to time the release of White to the release of the 2011 film Captain America: The First Avenger, and the series remained in development through 2014.

At a retailer breakfast at C2E2 in April 2015, a September 2015 release date was announced for Captain America: White #1. The issue was released as a double-sized issue containing a re-print of Captain America: White #0. The series maintained an irregular publishing schedule, with the final issue released on December 30, 2015. The series was collected into a deluxe hardcover released on February 17, 2016 and a trade paperback released on October 26. A Marvel Omnibus containing all four entries in the Color series was released on December 5, 2018.

== Themes and analysis ==
Black. And white. You saw it like I did, right, Bucky? That's the one thing I could always count on in my partner. With you gone ... without you to back me up ... what has my life become?

— Steve Rogers/Captain America,
Captain America: White #4

Subtitles for stories in the Color series each represent a double meaning, i.e. yellow in Daredevil: Yellow represents both the color of Daredevil's original costume and the color typically associated with cowardice. In White, the color is initially used in reference to black and white hat symbolism in film, as symbolic of Rogers's belief in the moral righteousness of his decision to fight in the war; he comments that "in the Westerns, we wore the white hats". Its secondary meaning refers to Rogers' struggle to apply this absolutism to a morally gray world and his ultimate rejection of black-and-white thinking, as manifested in his decision to save Barnes over the city of Paris.

While previous entries in the Color series focus on romantic relationships – Matt Murdock and Karen Page in Yellow, Peter Parker and Gwen Stacy in Blue, and Bruce Banner and Betty Ross in Gray – White is distinct in its focus on the platonic partnership between Rogers and Barnes. Loeb has stated that he wished to depict Rogers and Barnes as having a close-in-age fraternal relationship, in contrast to Golden Age comics that depicted Rogers as a much older father figure to Barnes. Conversely, Marvel Cinematic Universe screenwriters Christopher Markus and Stephen McFeely comment on the pseudo-romantic nature of Rogers' and Barnes' relationship in White in the foreword to the deluxe hardcover edition of the series:

No adventure is complete without a love story. And, yes, these books have one — the longest, most tortured one in Marvel history, in fact. We're talking about Steve and Bucky, without smirking or innuendo or raised eyebrows. Platonic though the relationship may be, from the meet cute to the tragic separation, their bond has all the elements of a classic romance. These two men love each other — as any pair of friends who faced exclusion, combat, inhumanity, and death would. Their bond stretches across half of the twentieth century. [...] Just as Jeph and Tim's earlier Daredevil: Yellow, Spider-Man: Blue, and Hulk: Gray all dealt with the major love interests in the heroes' lives, so too does Captain America: White. Steve and Bucky are each other's soulmate, if you will, because no one on Earth understands what either of them has been through as well as the other does.

== Reception ==
=== Critical response ===
White received positive reviews. Chris Galvin called the series "enjoyable the whole way through" and "a remarkable read" in a review of the final issue for ComicsVerse. Nerdist gave the series a 5 out of 5 rating, calling it a "true work of art" and offering praise for Sale and Dave Stewart's artwork. Sale's artwork was similarly commended by Jesse Schedeen in his review of issue #1 of White for IGN, who praised the series' Golden and Silver Age influences, but felt that the story was "a little too hokey". Conversely, in a review of issue #0 for Comic Book Resources, Augie De Blieck Jr. praised Loeb's storytelling and questioned whether Sale's stylized art was a good fit for a Captain America story. Newsarama gave the final issue in the series a 7 out of 10 rating, calling the series "well-paced and beautifully drawn, but ultimately empty", surmising White as "another beautiful but inconsequential Cap story".

=== Accolades ===
In 2009, Dave Stewart won an Eisner Award for Best Coloring for his work on White and other titles.

== Related media ==
Sgt. Fury & his Howling Commandos: Shotgun Opera, a one shot that serves as a companion to White, was published by Marvel in 2009.
