= Spider-Man: Lotus =

2023 film by Gavin J. Konop

- Release poster
- Directed by: Gavin J. Konop
- Screenplay by: Gavin J. Konop; Sean Thomas Reid; Warden Wayne
- Story by: Gavin J. Konop
- Based on: Spider-Man by: Stan Lee; Steve Ditko
- Produced by: Gavin J. Konop; Jacob Watson; Warden Wayne; Evan Jackson; Samuel Harmon
- Starring: Warden Wayne; Sean Thomas Reid; Moriah Brooklyn; Tuyen Powell
- Cinematography: Tristan Lawrence
- Edited by: Gavin J. Konop
- Music by: Caleb Liu; James Wong; Carl Abelgas; Josh McCausland; Erin Michael Rettig
- Production company: GJK
- Distributed by: GJK
- Release dates: August 5, 2023 (Los Angeles); August 11, 2023 (YouTube)
- Running time: 120 minutes
- Country: United States
- Language: English

Spider-Man: Lotus is a 2023 American superhero fan film based on the Marvel Comics character Spider-Man. It was produced, directed, and co-written by Gavin J. Konop. The film stars Warden Wayne as Peter Parker/ Spider-Man, Sean Thomas Reid as Harry Osborn, and Moriah Brooklyn as Mary Jane Watson.

The film is associated with neither Marvel Studios nor Sony Pictures and was funded by fans via an Indiegogo campaign. Its trailer trended on Twitter and YouTube, which helped gain exposure for the film. The film began receiving media attention in June 2022 after messages were leaked online in which Konop and Wayne used discriminatory language, igniting a controversy which was widely covered by news outlets.

The film received negative reviews from critics and fans, mainly from the portrayal of Spider-Man, as well as the film's script and runtime. On September 5, 2025, Konop released a recut of the film called The Kid Who Collects Spider-Man, which was more positively received.

== Plot ==
After defeating a new supervillain calling himself the Shocker, Peter Parker arrives late to a double date with his girlfriend Gwen Stacy and best friends Harry Osborn and Mary Jane Watson. After some initial friction due to his frequent absences, Peter plans to propose to Gwen during a planned vacation at the lake. However, Peter's arch-nemesis, the Green Goblin, arrives shortly thereafter, kidnaps Gwen, and takes her unconscious body to the top of the George Washington Bridge. Peter fails to save Gwen, resulting in a final battle between himself and the Goblin, resulting in the Goblin's death.

Sometime later, Peter has retired from being Spider-Man, blaming himself for failing to save Gwen's life and begins to shut others out. Haunted by the dreams of the night Gwen died, Peter angrily confronts Mary Jane and Harry for not caring about Gwen’s death. Though she is hurt, Mary Jane begrudgingly gives Peter a letter for him to give to Spider-Man, which asks if Spider-Man can pay a young child named Tim Harrison a visit before he succumbs to a terminal illness. Harry, despondent over his father's death and regretting the strained relationship the two of them had, leaves the city and goes on a bender, before returning to New York to visit his father's grave.

Peter arrives at the Harrisons' apartment as Spider-Man, meeting and bonding with Tim, who sees Spider-Man as a hero in spite of what the press says about him. However, when questioned about what happened to "the girl on the bridge", Peter convinces Tim that he is not a hero, claiming that his origin was an accident and that he only became Spider-Man for selfish desires. Peter abandons Tim, but Tim's mother convinces Peter to make amends with the boy, wanting to give him hope in his dying days. Peter apologizes and even unmasks in front of Tim, who recognizes Peter as Spider-Man's photographer. Peter bids farewell to Tim, encouraging him to stay strong in the face of fear.

Elsewhere, Mary Jane and Harry begin to patch up their relationship as Peter returns to the cemetery to pay his respects at Gwen’s grave. In the distance, he also notices Tim's grave as well, realizing that even though he may not "want" to be Spider-Man, he "needs" to continue being Spider-Man to inspire others.

== Cast ==
- Warden Wayne as Peter Parker / Spider-Man: a 20-year-old superhero who has been active for the past five years
  - Landon Konop as young Peter Parker
- Sean Thomas Reid as Harry Osborn: the lonely, drug-addicted best friend of Peter Parker, and son of Norman Osborn
- Moriah Brooklyn as Mary Jane Watson: the best friend of Peter Parker and Harry Osborn's girlfriend, who helps with his grief over the death of Gwen
- Tuyen Powell as Gwen Stacy: the girlfriend of Peter Parker, who died during a battle between Spider-Man and the Green Goblin
- Maxwell Fox-Andrews as Tim Harrison: A terminally ill child whose last wish is to meet Spider-Man
- John Salandria as Norman Osborn / Green Goblin: Harry’s father and the villain responsible for Gwen’s death
- Jack Wooten as Flash Thompson
- Mariah Fox as Ms. Harrison
- Justin Hargrove as Herman Schultz / Shocker
- Paul Logan as Dennis Carradine / Burglar

== Production ==
On January 16, 2021, independent filmmaker Gavin J. Konop announced the development of an upcoming film based on the character Spider-Man. The film was funded by fans through a campaign on Indiegogo, receiving $112,000. According to Konop, it was a dream of his to make a Spider-Man film. The film is loosely based on two comic books, "The Kid Who Collects Spider-Man" and Spider-Man: Blue.

Later that year, Konop announced the main cast of the film as well as its synopsis and its main theme. The same year the teaser and the trailer were uploaded to his channel. The script was finished in May 2021, with production beginning in June with principal photography wrapping on August. Filming took place in New York City.

In October 2021, the project was recognized by Jon Watts, the director of the Marvel Cinematic Universe Spider-Man films, who stated that he was "100% supportive" of the film.

Spider-Man: Lotus was originally set to premiere in January 2022, but was delayed. In October 2022, the film’s final trailer was released to YouTube.

In July 2023, a scene from Spider-Man: Lotus was released on Konop's social media, its runtime of 120 minutes was revealed, and it was set for a release date. It was released on YouTube on August 11, 2023.

== Release ==
Spider-Man: Lotus held its premiere in Los Angeles, California. It was released on YouTube on August 11, 2023.

Spider-Man: Lotus was negatively received by critics. Allegra Frank of The Daily Beast called Spider Man: Lotus "a lousy film, technically impressive in flashes but weighed down by disastrous performances, scripting, and direction."

Ryan Brown of Pantheon of Film called Spider-Man: Lotus "an insult to Spider-Man", citing poor dialogue, amateurish acting, and the script's heavy reliance on flashbacks. Brown was particularly critical of Warden Wayne's portrayal of Peter Parker. "None of the other live-action Spider-Man actors come close to being as bad of a character adaptation than Warden Wayne’s portrayal."

== The Kid Who Collects Spider-Man ==
On September 5, 2025, Konop released a re-cut of the film called The Kid Who Collects Spider-Man, based on Roger Stern's comic of the same name and inspired by Spider-Man: Blue. The cut focuses more on the emotional story of Peter and Tim, as well as Peter attempting to move on from Gwen's death. In addition, the re-cut also removes the scenes with Mary Jane and Harry, alters Peter's lines when he talks to Tim, to make him more likeable and added in new scenes that better connects the story.

The re-cut was positively received by fans, with many calling it a major improvement over Lotus.

== See also ==
- Batman Dracula
- Batman: Dying Is Easy
- Viva Spider-Man
