= Batman: Dark Victory =

American limited comic book series (1999–2000)

- Trade paperback of Dark Victory

Publication information
- Publisher: DC Comics
- Schedule: Monthly
- Format: Limited series
- Publication date: November 1999 – December 2000
- No. of issues: 14
- Main character(s): Batman; Jim Gordon; The Hangman; Two-Face; Robin; Catwoman

Creative team
- Written by: Jeph Loeb
- Artist: Tim Sale

Collected editions
- Hardcover: ISBN 1563897385
- Hardcover (Titan Books): ISBN 184023332X
- Trade Paperback: ISBN 1563898683
- Trade Paperback (Titan Books): ISBN 1840234172
- Absolute Edition: ISBN 1401235107
- 2014 Trade Paperback: ISBN 1401244017
- Noir: ISBN 1401271065
- Deluxe Edition: ISBN 1779514832

Batman: Dark Victory is a 14-part American comic book limited series (including a #0 issue) published by DC Comics, featuring the superhero Batman. The series, which ran from 1999 until 2000, was written by Jeph Loeb and drawn by Tim Sale, and it serves as a sequel to Batman: The Long Halloween. Batman: Dark Victory takes place primarily four to five years into Batman's career as a vigilante crimefighter. The plot centers on a series of murders involving Gotham City police officers by a mysterious serial killer only known as the Hangman. Central to the storyline is a territory war between Two-Face and the remnants of the Falcone mob, led by Sofia Falcone.

The story is also a re-telling of the origins of Batman's sidekick Robin and his adoption by Bruce Wayne. The story brings closure to many characters introduced in Frank Miller's Batman: Year One.

In 2004, Loeb and Sale produced a follow-up titled Catwoman: When in Rome, focusing on Catwoman's movements in Italy. The story takes place during the events of Dark Victory, between Valentine's Day (when Catwoman leaves Gotham) and Labor Day.

== Plot ==
It has been several months after the killer known as "Holiday" was apprehended. (Note: As depicted in Batman: The Long Halloween (1996-97)) "Holiday" was actually Alberto Falcone, attempting to one-up his father Carmine Falcone, and prove he is more than capable of handling the family business. Janice Porter has replaced Harvey Dent as Gotham City's district attorney and despises Batman's methods, although Commissioner Jim Gordon tries to sway her opinion.

Bruce blames himself for Dent's descent into villainy and has become even more of a loner, refusing Gordon and Catwoman's assistance. During a visit to Dent's cell, there is a large breakout of most of the inmates of Arkham Asyulm. Alberto is not one of them. Batman insists Sofia Gigante had some hand in the breakout, but she assures him she does not, as since their last visit she now uses a wheelchair and has a brace on her head.

Porter allows the release of Alberto to house arrest in his brother Mario's custody at their father's old estate. Shortly after his release, Clancy O'Hara's body is found hanged from the Gotham city bridge, his old patrol. Taped to his chest is a newspaper clipping, headlined "Holiday goes free", with a hangman riddle written on it.

Batman interrogates the Riddler, the only man whom Holiday attacked but did not kill, but he assures Batman that he does not know why Holiday spared him. In the Falcone estate, Alberto begins to hear his father's voice, telling him to continue his work as the Holiday killer. Soon after the Riddler meets with Batman, saying that the killer assumes that another person is playing their twisted game, ex-commissioner Gillian B. Loeb is found hanged from his stairs in his mansion, another riddle on his chest.

Later, another corrupt officer, Detective Arnold Flass is found hanged outside the strip club where he worked as a bouncer. Batman believes that Alberto is the newly dubbed "Hangman" killer, or knows who the person is. He interrogates him, but learns nothing and leaves to search for Dent. Entering the sewers, Batman fights Solomon Grundy, and he leads Batman to Dent's new office. Searching his office, there is an explosion and Batman loses Dent underground.

Another hanging is committed, Sgt. Pratt with another note on his chest. All of the notes have come from Dent's old desk as the D.A.; all of the evidence suggests that he is the killer. Dent is revealed to have been meeting with Porter, with whom he has been secretly having an affair. Another hanging is found, this time in front of Dent's old house. Officer Merkel is found with another note on his chest. Dent, taken over by his darker side, conducts his own investigation throughout the escaped criminals, questioning all of them as to the identity of the Hangman killer. Gordon is almost hanged on the roof of the precinct, but is saved by Dent, who assures the men that he is not the Hangman killer.

Multiple attacks on organized crime by the Joker are perpetrated, and he eventually assaults the Falcone estate, attacking the members of the family before being apprehended by Batman. Another hanging is found inside the garage of the precinct. Batman adopts a young Dick Grayson after his family is killed during a mob sabotage, and he begins his training to be his partner.

During a police raid on Dent's underground hideout, Batman assists Gordon and they eventually catch him. During all of which, Alberto is still hearing his father's voice telling him to continue his work. He is eventually pushed to the point of almost murdering his sister, but resists the temptation. Dent is put on trial, but escapes when the other criminals assault the court.

Janice is kidnapped by the Joker and the Scarecrow, and when she argues with Dent, he kills her. They dump the body into Alberto Falcone's bed to convince him he killed her. Finally, he breaks the facade and it is revealed that Calendar Man had secretly placed microphones all over the house and manipulated him. Batman investigates Mario Falcone's penthouse and is almost hanged, but frees himself due to having metal braces to protect his neck and attacks Catwoman. She reveals that she investigated Sofia and found no record of her visiting an orthopedist, despite using a wheelchair. After escaping the estate, Sofia and Alberto meet inside the family mausoleum; she kills him, telling him he is not a real Falcone.

At the Batcave, Dick correctly translates the clues left behind that they refer to protecting the Falcone family, and Batman scrambles to leave. At his hideout, Dent is attacked when several explosions rip through his lair. Finally, the Hangman killer is revealed as Sofia. She had killed everyone who had helped Dent to become the District Attorney and further his career, and left clues to make it look like it was him all along. Her final ploy was to pretend to be paraplegic, leaving her as the last suspect. During the ensuing fight, Sofia is shot by Dent and Batman gives chase.

Dick intervenes, now wearing a uniform as "Robin", and he assists Batman in the recapture of the criminals. Joker shoots Dent, and he falls presumably to his death. Mario Falcone, now a broken man, torches his family's estate, leaving his family destroyed. Selina Kyle arrives at Carmine's grave, and confesses the truth that she knows that he was her father, but cannot prove it yet. Dent is revealed to have Carmine Falcone's body, and it was frozen, presumably, by Mr. Freeze. Dick takes an oath with Batman in the Batcave to help him in his crusade against crime.

== Themes ==
In the introduction to the trade paperback, Tim Sale states that he was hesitant to join with Jeph Loeb on the project as he did not care for Robin, given his stark contrast to Sale's interpretation of Batman. Loeb, however, insisted that the teaming of the two characters was essential to the story. A major theme of the story concerns how the three protagonists of The Long Halloween now feel alone. Throughout the book Batman struggles with this, his refusal to accept help from Commissioner Gordon, as well as with his fear of being wrong, a side-effect of the Scarecrow's fear gas. Catwoman even slaps Batman when he shows no interest in what might happen to Two-Face. Dick Grayson is depicted in the story as one of Bruce Wayne's only remaining anchors to humanity.

== Collected editions ==
The entire series has been collected in trade paperbacks, hardcovers, an absolute edition, a noir edition, and a deluxe edition:

- Hardcover (ISBN 1563897385), DC Comics, 2001.
- Hardcover (ISBN 184023332X), Titan Books, 2001.
- Trade paperback (ISBN 1563898683), DC Comics, 2002.
- Trade paperback (ISBN 1840234172), Titan Books, 2002.
- Absolute Edition, hardcover (ISBN 1401235107), DC Comics, 2012.
- New trade paperback (ISBN 1401244017), DC Comics, 2014.
- Noir Edition, hardcover (ISBN 1401271065), DC Comics, 2017.
- Deluxe Edition, hardcover (ISBN 1779514832), DC Comics, 2022.

== Critical reaction ==
Critical reaction to Dark Victory has been mostly positive.

Hilary Goldstein of IGN Comics said that "Dark Victory is not quite as good as The Long Halloween" and added that "it's too heavily dependent on the original to stand on its own", but praised how Dark Victory "uses the events of The Long Halloween to further explore the psychological makeup of the Dark Knight" and "add[s] new context to the Batman we all know and love." Goldstein later ranked Dark Victory #10 on a list of the 25 best Batman graphic novels, but the list has been updated since its release in 2005 and is now ranked at #7.

Dave Wallace of Comics Bulletin said that Dark Victory "doesn't quite live up to the high standards set by The Long Halloween" but praised "Loeb's note-perfect understanding of what makes the Batman tick" and added that "Tim Sale's artwork also keeps on hitting new highs." Wallace concluded that Dark Victory is "definitely worthy of your attention and a place on your bookshelf."

Sion Smith of Counter Culture said that "where Dark Victory really works is in its patience. Its willingness to let the story go where it needs to in its own time is a godsend", and added that "Tim Sale's depiction of a city at war with itself is one of the freshest views of Gotham we've seen in a long time, while Loeb's storytelling is as fluent as I've come to expect from him."

Dark Victory, along with its predecessor The Long Halloween, are personal favorites of Dark Knight Trilogy star Christian Bale, and served as prime inspirations for his take on playing Bruce Wayne/Batman.
