= Catwoman: When in Rome =

2004 comic book miniseries

- Book cover

Publication information
- Publisher: DC Comics
- Schedule: Monthly
- Format: Limited series
- Genre: Superhero
- Publication date: 2004
- No. of issues: 6
- Main character(s): Catwoman; Riddler

Creative team
- Written by: Jeph Loeb
- Artist(s): Tim Sale

Collected editions
- Hardcover: ISBN 1401204325
- Trade Paperback: ISBN 1401207170
- Absolute Edition: ISBN 1401251226
- Deluxe Edition: ISBN 1779515022

Catwoman: When in Rome is a DC Comics six-issue miniseries written by Jeph Loeb and drawn by Tim Sale. Sale took inspiration for his art from René Gruau, the French/Italian fashion illustrator.

The story features the DC Comics character Catwoman, on a trip to Rome to find information concerning her long-lost parents, who she believes to be the crime lord Carmine Falcone and his wife Louisa. The story takes place parallel to the later issues of Batman: Dark Victory.

== Plot ==
Monday: Catwoman and the Riddler take a trip to Rome, traveling incognito as Selina Kyle and Edward Nygma (or 'Eddie', as Selina refers to him). During the flight Selina falls asleep and has a vivid nightmare involving Batman, the first of several such dreams which she experiences over the following days. On arriving in Rome, she and Eddie meet Christopher Castillo, 'The Blond', a hitman who sets up a meeting between Selina and a local crime boss, Don Verinni. Selina decides to scout out Verinni's villa in costume as Catwoman, and in doing so comes face-to-face with the mafia kingpin. Pretending that Kyle and Catwoman are separate people, she explains that Selina is in Rome for information about Carmine Falcone's past. Before she can give any more details, Verinni drops dead, having been poisoned with the Joker's distinctive venom. Catwoman is blamed and promptly chased out of the villa by Verinni's goons.

Tuesday: Selina, Eddie and the Blond are almost killed when Selina's hotel room is set on fire by the mafia, and the trio escape to the Blond's yacht at Anzio. Verinni's son Guillermo tracks them down and attacks the yacht, using Mr. Freeze's freeze gun to encase Catwoman in a block of ice, but the Blond manages to fend off the attackers and pilot the yacht out to sea, while Eddie rescues Catwoman from the ice.

Wednesday: The Blond informs Selina that she might be able to buy Guillermo off by acquiring for him a priceless ring which has immense symbolic significance for the mafia and is currently held for safekeeping by the Vatican. Eddie plots out a way of stealing the ring but is then required to return to Gotham City, where he attends the Hangman trial conducted by Two-Face during the parallel events of Batman: Dark Victory. In his absence Catwoman carries out the plan he has drawn up, successfully stealing the ring from St Peter's Basilica, but she is ambushed by the Cheetah, who knocks her out and ties her up in the ruins of the Colosseum.

Thursday: Catwoman manages to escape her bonds, overpower the Cheetah and recover the ring with the help of the Blond, and the pair then return to the latter's yacht, where they are joined by the Riddler, newly returned from Gotham.

Friday: Using the ring as bait, Catwoman and the Blond lure Guillermo Verinni into a trap, and Selina forces him to disclose the current whereabouts of Carmine Falcone's widow, Louisa, who it transpires is now living as a nun at a fortified convent in the mountains. Catwoman infiltrates the convent and speaks to Louisa, explaining that she believes herself to be a long-lost daughter of Carmine and Louisa, but the latter denies that she has any daughters other than Sofia. After Catwoman leaves, Louisa orders the Blond - who is revealed to be her godson - to kill Catwoman and recover the mafia ring for her.

Saturday: As Catwoman ponders her situation, back on the Blond's yacht, she is seemingly attacked by Batman. However, by now she has realised that the nightmares she has been having all week about him are actually hallucinations brought on by the Scarecrow's fear gas. The Scarecrow is in Italy and in cahoots with the Riddler, who has been surreptitiously dosing her with the gas in the hope that while hallucinating she would reveal the answer to what he considers to be the greatest riddle of all - Batman's secret identity. He has also been engineering events to prolong their stay in Rome, first by colluding with Guillermo to murder Verinni and then by hiring the Cheetah to hijack Catwoman's Vatican heist. Moreover, it was he who supplied Guillermo with the Joker poison and the Freeze gun. With the secret out, the Riddler attacks Catwoman together with Guillermo, the Cheetah and the Scarecrow, but she manages to defeat them with the aid of the Blond, who has decided to betray Louisa because he has fallen in love with Selina.

The Blond reveals to Selina that Louisa was lying when she said she only had one daughter - she and Carmine had a second daughter after Sofia but gave her up for adoption while she was still an infant. Selina and the Blond go on a romantic holiday to Palermo and plan to return to Gotham together, but before they can do so the Blond is murdered by Louisa in revenge for his betrayal. Unaware that the Blond is dead, Selina waits for him at the airport, and when he fails to show up she assumes he has got cold feet and leaves Italy alone, taking with her the priceless mafia ring.

Sunday: In a brief epilogue, identical to a scene from Batman: Dark Victory, Catwoman bids farewell to Carmine Falcone at his grave, convinced that he is her father but still unable to find conclusive proof.

== Aftermath ==
During the events of Batman: Dark Victory, Catwoman informs Batman that Sofia Falcone travelled to Sicily after the events of Batman: The Long Halloween and had plastic surgery there to repair her distinctive facial scars, a vital clue which helps Batman to solve the Hangman murders. It is implied that Catwoman learned about Sofia's operation while in Palermo with the Blond during the events of When in Rome.

In a later story by Jeph Loeb, Batman: Hush, the Riddler's obsession to uncover Batman's secret identity finally proves successful.

== Collected editions ==
The entire series has been collected in a trade paperback, a hardcover, and a deluxe edition:

- Hardcover (ISBN 1401204325), DC Comics, 2005.
- Trade paperback (ISBN 1401207170), DC Comics, 2007.
- Absolute Edition, hardcover (ISBN 1401251226), DC Comics, 2014.
- Deluxe Edition, hardcover (ISBN 1779515022), DC Comics, 2022.
