= Tim Sale (artist) =

American comic artist (1956–2022)

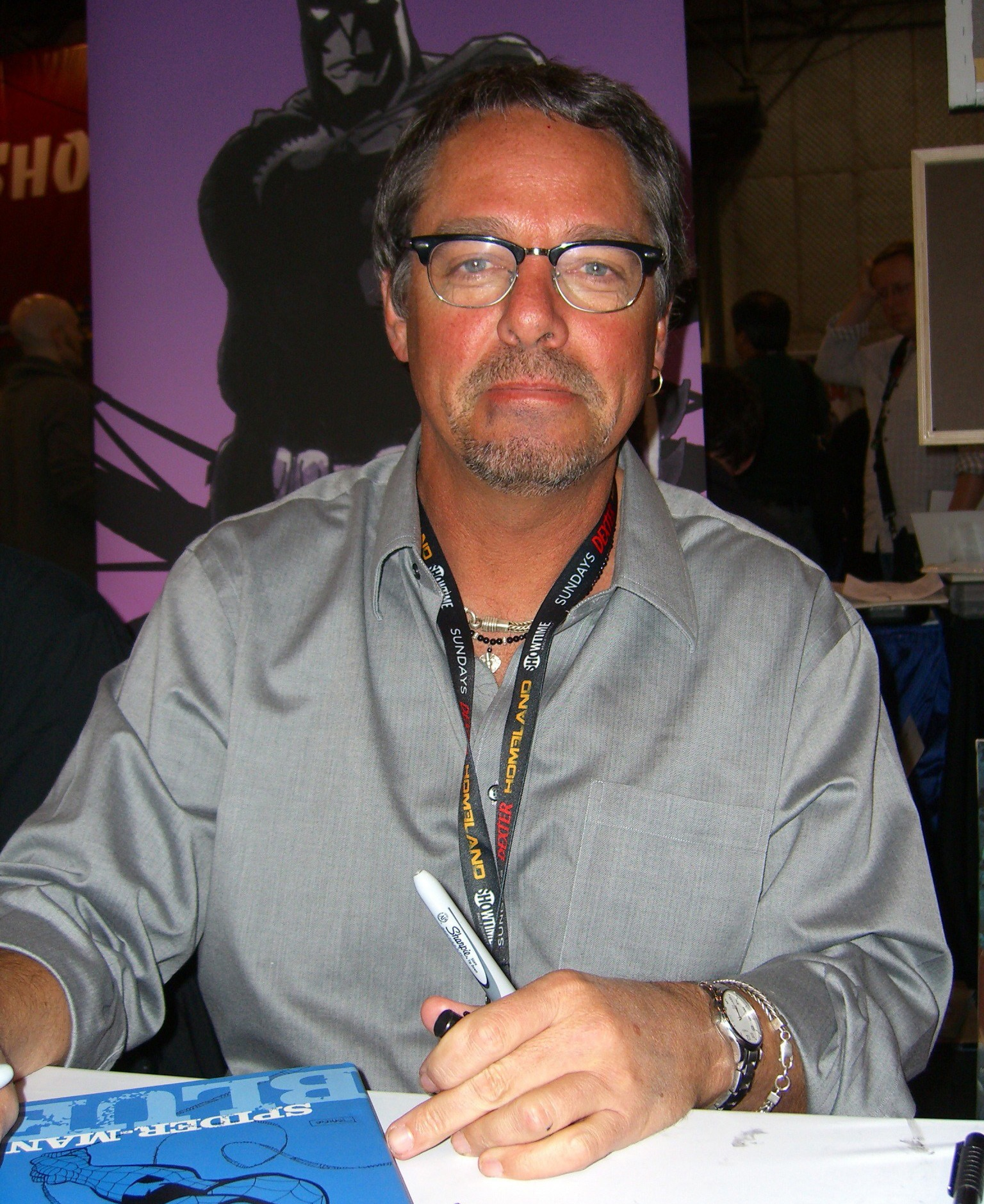
- Sale at the 2011 New York Comic Con
- Born: May 1, 1956 Ithaca, New York, U.S.
- Died: June 16, 2022 (aged 66) Seattle, Washington, U.S.
- Areas: Penciller, Inker
- Notable works: Batman: The Long Halloween; Batman: Dark Victory; Superman For All Seasons
- Awards: Eisner Award "Best Artist/Penciller/Inker or Penciller/Inker Team", 1999

Timothy Roger Sale (May 1, 1956 – June 16, 2022) was an American comics artist, "best known for his work on the DC Comics characters Batman and Superman and for influencing depictions of Batman in numerous films." He is primarily known for his collaborations with writer Jeph Loeb, which included both comics work and artwork for the TV series Heroes. Sale's renditions of Batman, particularly in his works Batman: The Long Halloween and Batman: Dark Victory, influenced modern cinematic depictions of the character, with film directors and actors directly citing Sale's work.

== Early life ==
Tim Sale was born on May 1, 1956, in Ithaca, New York, the son of Dorothy Young, a feminist political activist, and Roger Sale, a literary critic.

He spent most of his early life in Seattle, Washington, having moved there with his family at age six. He attended the University of Washington for two years before moving to New York City to attend the School of Visual Arts, as well as the comics workshop run by artist John Buscema. Mr. Sale completed the "John Buscema Art School, which was advertised in the pages of Marvel Comics and held in a New York City hotel for a short time in the 1970s."

He returned to Seattle before graduating from SVA.

== Career ==
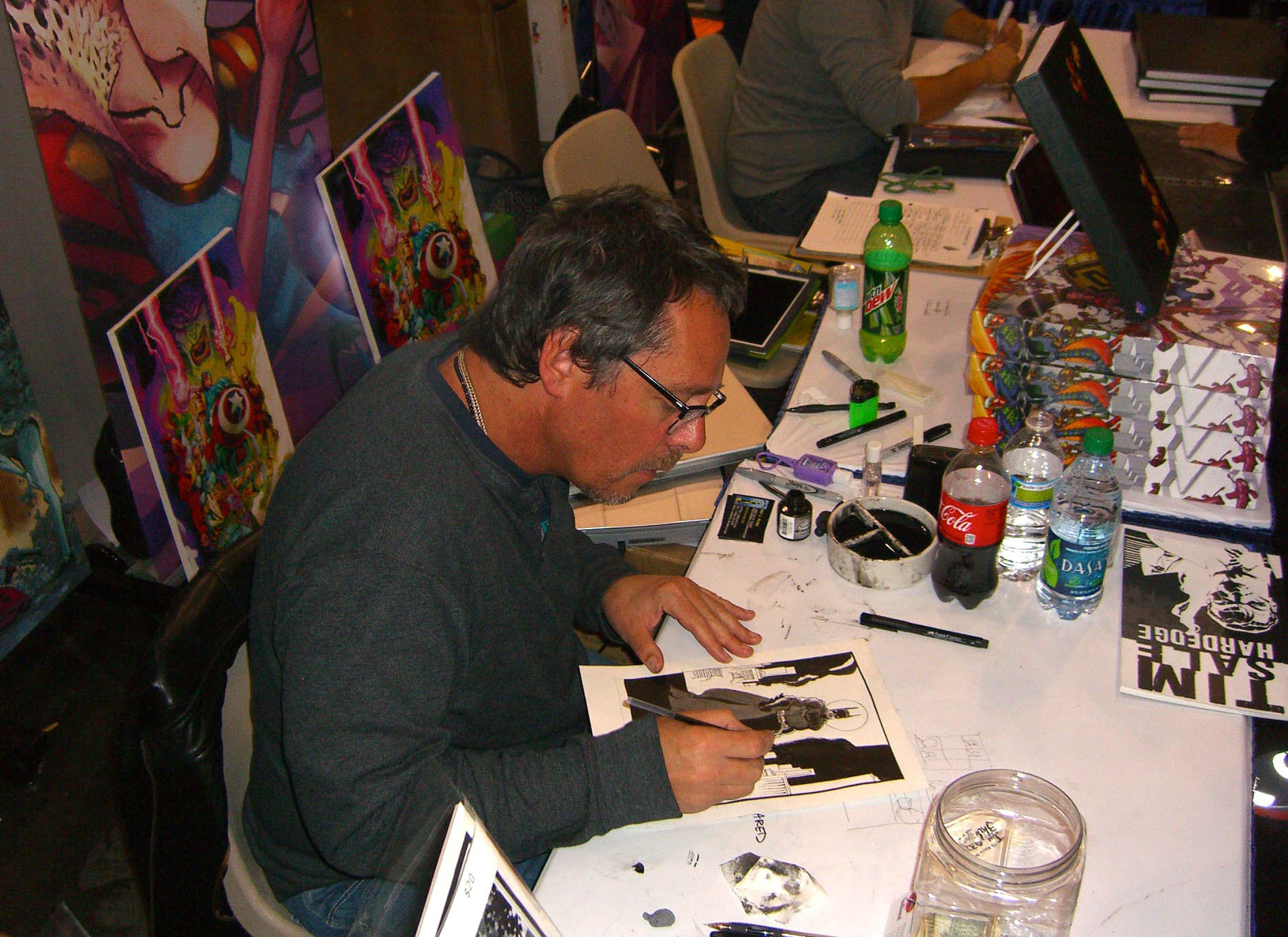
Sale sketching

Sale began doing art for the series MythAdventures in 1983, and was soon working on Thieves' World.

The body of Sale's comics work has been with collaborator Jeph Loeb. The duo, credited in their comics as 'storytellers', produced popular work such as the "Year 1"-centered Batman: Legends of the Dark Knight Halloween Specials, Batman: The Long Halloween, Batman: Dark Victory, as well as Superman for All Seasons and Catwoman: When in Rome. At Marvel Comics, the team has produced the so-called "color" books such as Daredevil: Yellow, Spider-Man: Blue, and Hulk: Gray. A Captain America: White limited series was announced in 2008 but only a #0 issue was published. The long-delayed project finally saw print in September 2015.

With Darwyn Cooke, Sale launched the Superman Confidential series in 2007.

Sale worked on artwork for the television program Heroes, where his frequent collaborator Jeph Loeb served as a writer and producer. Sale's artwork appeared in the show as the work of the precognitive artist Isaac Mendez as well as other artists on the show. Eric Powell was hired as the colorist for Sale's work. Sale also created the font used in the show's captions and credits, which he based on his handwriting.

In 2021, The Long Halloween was adapted for a two-part animated film from Warner Bros. Home Entertainment.

== Awards ==
Sale won an Eisner Award in 1999 in the "Best Artist/Penciller/Inker or Penciller/Inker Team" category for his work on Superman for All Seasons.

== Personal life and death ==
Sale lived in the Seattle metropolitan area. On June 13, 2022, Jim Lee announced Sale had been admitted to the hospital with severe health issues. Representatives of Sale later confirmed he was in the hospital while asking for privacy. Three days later, Sale died on June 16, from kidney failure. "He is survived by his mother; his sister, Maggie Sale; and his partner, Susan Bailey."

== Legacy ==
DC Comics publisher Jim Lee praised Sale, saying, "Tim Sale was an amazing artist, draftsman and storyteller. Beyond the taut chiaroscuro style which became his trademark. Tim clearly put a premium on storytelling, clarity and pacing — cherishing emotion above all. His stories were beautifully visceral, nuanced and evinced deep humanity. Tim simply had no use for surface banality."

Filmmakers Christopher Nolan and Matt Reeves, both of whom directed Batman films, have cited Batman: The Long Halloween and its sequel, Batman: Dark Victory, as an influence on those films. In an interview with the website World of Batman, Christian Bale, who played the character, characterized the "really fantastic imagery" with which Sale rendered those works. Commenting on Sale's figurework, Bale stated, "I would kind of imitate those positions."

The 2023 video game Justice League: Cosmic Chaos was dedicated to his memory along with Gilbert Gottfried, Neal Adams, Alan Grant, George Pérez, and Kevin Conroy, all of whom also died in the same year.

== Bibliography ==
=== Selected works ===
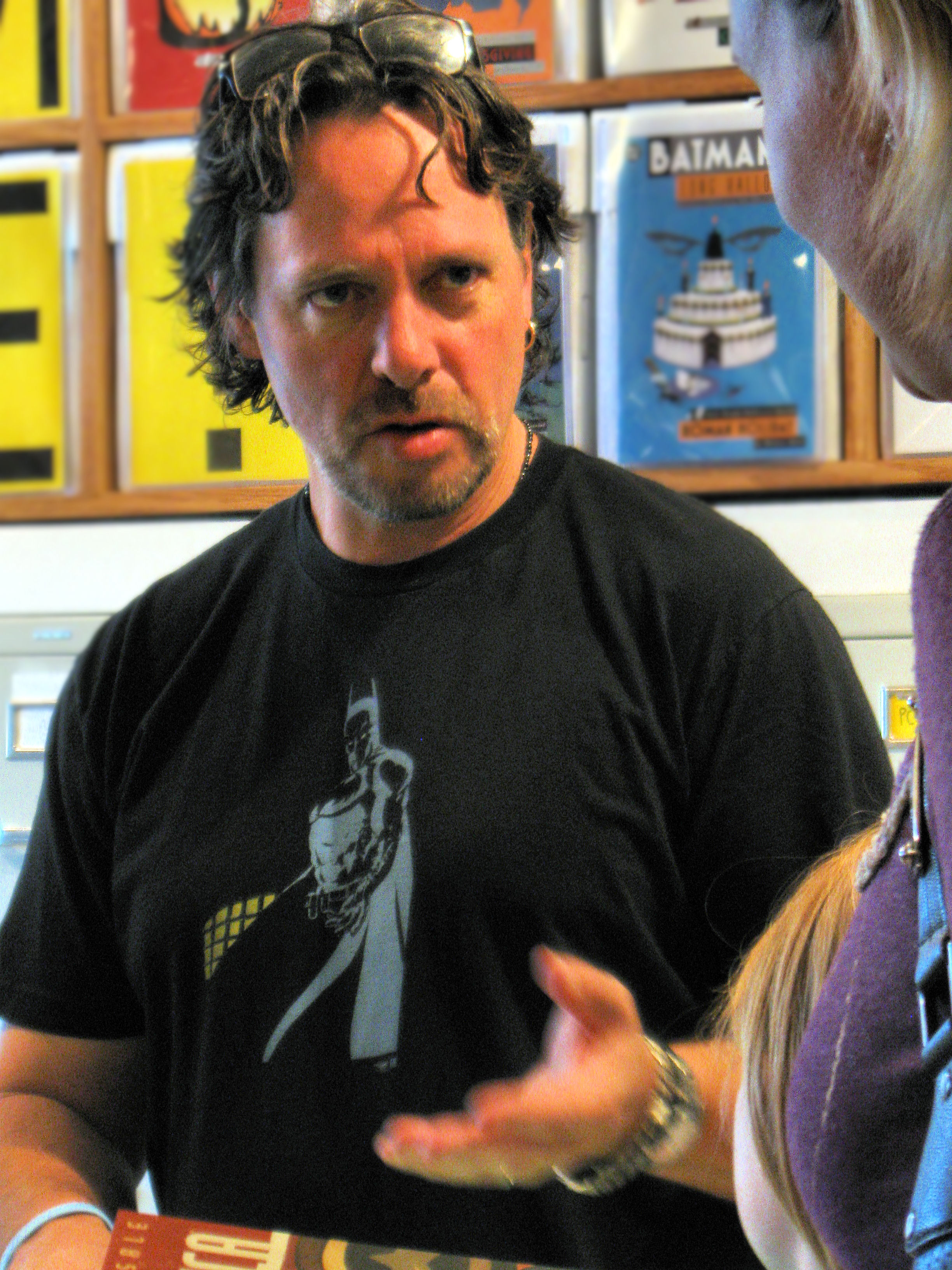
Sale at Golden Age Collectables, Seattle, Washington

- Billi 99 (with Sarah Byam)
- Grendel (with Matt Wagner)
- Deathblow (with Jim Lee and Brandon Choi)
- Superman Confidential [aka "Superman: Kryptonite"] (with Darwyn Cooke)
- Tim Sale: Black and White hardcover (Active Images, 2004); Revised and Expanded Edition (Image Comics, 2008). An art and career retrospective of Tim Sale. By Richard Starkings and John "JG" Roshell with Tim Sale.

With Jeph Loeb

- Challengers of the Unknown Must Die! collects Challengers of the Unknown vol. 2 #1–8 (March–Oct. 1991), DC Comics, trade paperback 224 pages, October 2004, ISBN 978-1-4012-0374-0
- Batman: Haunted Knight collects Batman: Legends of the Dark Knight Halloween Special #1 (Dec. 1993), Batman: Madness A Legends of the Dark Knight Halloween Special #1 (1994), and Batman: Ghosts Legends of the Dark Knight Halloween Special #1 (1995), DC Comics, trade paperback 192 pages, September 1996, ISBN 978-1-56389-273-8
- Wolverine & Gambit: Victims collects Wolverine/Gambit: Victims #1–4 (Sept.–Dec. 1995), Marvel Comics, hardcover 112 pages, November 2009, ISBN 978-0-7851-3802-0; trade paperback March 2013, ISBN 978-0-7851-6717-4
- Batman: The Long Halloween collects Batman: The Long Halloween #1–13 (Dec. 1996–Dec. 1997), DC Comics, hardcover 369 pages, February 1999, ISBN 978-1-56389-427-5; trade paperback October 2011, ISBN 978-1-4012-3259-7
- Superman for All Seasons collects Superman For All Seasons #1–4 (Sept.–Dec. 1998), DC Comics, hardcover 208 pages, October 1999, ISBN 978-1-56389-528-9; trade paperback October 2002, ISBN 978-1-56389-529-6
- Batman: Dark Victory collects Batman: Dark Victory #1–13 (Dec. 1999–Dec. 2000), DC Comics, hardcover 408 pages, May 2012, ISBN 978-1-4012-3510-9; trade paperback 392 pages, October 2002, ISBN 978-1-56389-868-6
- Daredevil: Yellow collects Daredevil: Yellow #1–6 (Aug. 2001–Jan. 2002), Marvel Comics, hardcover 160 pages, July 2002, ISBN 978-0-7851-0840-5; trade paperback July 2011, ISBN 978-0-7851-0969-3
- Spider-Man: Blue collects Spider-Man: Blue #1–6 (July 2002 – April 2003), Marvel Comics, hardcover 160 pages, May 2003, ISBN 978-0-7851-1062-0; trade paperback August 2011, ISBN 978-0-7851-1071-2
- Hulk: Gray collects Hulk: Gray #1–6 (Dec. 2003 – April 2004), Marvel Comics, trade paperback 168 pages, June 2011, ISBN 978-0-7851-1346-1
- Catwoman: When in Rome collects Catwoman: When in Rome #1–6 (Nov. 2004–Aug. 2005), DC Comics, hardcover 160 pages, December 2005, ISBN 978-1-4012-0432-7; trade paperback June 2007, ISBN 978-1-4012-0717-5
- Solo #1 (Dec. 2004) with Jeph Loeb, Brian Azzarello, Darwyn Cooke, and Diana Schutz, DC Comics
- Captain America: White #0–5 (Sept. 2008–Dec. 2015), Marvel Comics
- Batman: The Long Halloween Special #1 (2021)

=== Short stories ===
- Grendel: Black, White & Red #1 (Dark Horse Comics, 1998). Eight-page short story with writer Matt Wagner.
- Robert E. Howard's Myth Maker (1999). One-shot drawn by several pencillers such as John Bolton (also cover artist of the issue), Richard Corben or Kelley Jones. Tim Sale drew several pages, with script by Roy Thomas.
- Vampirella: Rebirth #1 (Harris Comics, 1999). Eight-page short story with writer Jeph Loeb, and variant cover.
- 9-11: The World's Finest Comic Book Writers & Artists Tell Stories to Remember, Volume Two (DC Comics). One-page short story from an idea by Chuck Kim.
- Buffy the Vampire Slayer: Tales of the Slayers TPB (Dark Horse Comics, February 2002). Cover and short story (12 pages) written by Joss Whedon, about a female medieval vampire hunter.
- JSA: All Stars #2 (DC Comics, 2003). Six-page back up story about the Golden Age Hawkman and Hawkgirl, with writer Jeph Loeb.
- Tales of The Batman: Tim Sale collection of Batman tales drawn by Tim Sale in his career with writers Darwyn Cooke, Alan Grant, James Robinson, and Kelley Puckett, 240 pages, January 2009, ISBN 978-1-4012-1735-8
- Kiss Miss Carol: A Crime Story of Christmas. An illustrated short story with writer Brian Mulcahy, 40 pages, April 15, 2012, ISBN 978-1475200225

=== Cover work ===
- The Foot Soldiers #3 (Dark Horse Comics, 1996)
- Adventures of Superman #597, Batgirl #21, Detective Comics #763, Harley Quinn #13, JSA #29 and The Spectre #10 (DC Comics, December 2001). All the issues were part of the "Last Laugh" crossover.
- Flinch #5 (DC Comics/Vertigo, 1999)
- El Diablo #1–4 (DC Comics/Vertigo, 2001)
- Queen & Country #1–4 (Oni Press, 2001)
- Detective Comics #777–796 (DC Comics, February 2003 – September 2004)
- Batgirl #69–73 (DC Comics)
- Batman (vol. 3) #1–5, 17, 21–23, 29–30, 38, 54 (DC Comics)
