= Hulk: Gray =

American comic book series

- Art by Tim Sale.

Publication information
- Publisher: Marvel Comics
- Schedule: Monthly
- Format: Limited series
- Genre: Superhero
- Publication date: December 2003-April 2004
- No. of issues: 6
- Main character(s): Hulk; Betty Ross; Tony Stark; General Ross; Leonard Samson

Creative team
- Written by: Jeph Loeb
- Artist: Tim Sale
- Letterer: Richard Starkings
- Colorist: Matt Hollingsworth
- Editor(s): Kelly Lamy; Joe Quesada; Nanci Quesada; Bronwyn Taggart

Hulk: Gray is a comic book limited series written by Jeph Loeb and illustrated by Tim Sale.

== Publication history ==
The series ran for a total of six issues which followed the early years of Bruce Banner and his problems as the Hulk. Jeph Loeb and Tim Sale also collaborated on other limited series such as: Daredevil: Yellow, Spider-Man: Blue, and Captain America: White. Each series, like Hulk: Gray, followed the early years of the different Marvel Comics heroes.

== Plot ==
Bruce Banner's life was torn apart by the explosion of the Gamma Bomb. From that moment on, he unleashed the strongest creature on Earth, The Incredible Hulk. No matter how powerful he became, his heart could still be shattered by Betty Ross, the daughter of General "Thunderbolt" Ross.

=== Issues ===
| Title | Release date | Cover Date |
|---|---|---|
| Hulk: Gray Vol 1 #1 | October 15, 2003 | December 2003 |
| Hulk: Gray Vol 1 #2 | October 29, 2003 | December 2003 |
| Hulk: Gray Vol 1 #3 | November 19, 2003 | January 2004 |
| Hulk: Gray Vol 1 #4 | December 17, 2003 | February 2004 |
| Hulk: Gray Vol 1 #5 | January 28, 2004 | March 2004 |
| Hulk: Gray Vol 1 #6 | February 25, 2004 | April 2004 |

== In other media ==
The comic was the primary inspiration for the 2008 film The Incredible Hulk.

== Collected editions ==
| Title | Material collected | Published date | ISBN |
|---|---|---|---|
| Hulk: Gray | Hulk: Gray #1-6 | July 2004 | 978-0785113140 |
| Jeph Loeb & Tim Sale: Yellow, Blue and Gray Omnibus | Hulk: Gray #1-6 and Spider-Man: Blue #1-6, Daredevil: Yellow #1-6 | August 2014 | 978-0785188315 |
| Jeph Loeb & Tim Sale: Yellow, Blue, Gray & White Omnibus | Hulk: Gray #1-6 and Spider-Man: Blue #1-6, Daredevil: Yellow #1-6, Captain America: White #0-5 | December 2018 | 978-1302914059 |
