= Spider-Man: Blue =

Six-issue limited comic book series by Jeph Loeb and Tim Sale

- Dustjacket of the hardcover collection Art by Tim Sale.

Publication information
- Publisher: Marvel Comics
- Schedule: Monthly
- Format: Limited series
- Genre: Superhero
- Publication date: July 2002 – April 2003
- No. of issues: 6
- Main character(s): Spider-Man; Gwen Stacy; Mary Jane Watson; Kraven the Hunter

Creative team
- Written by: Jeph Loeb
- Artist: Tim Sale
- Letterer(s): Wes Abbott; Richard Starkings
- Colorist: Steve Buccellato
- Editors: Kelly Lamy; Joe Quesada; Nanci Quesada; Bronwyn Taggart

Collected editions
- Hardcover: ISBN 0-7851-3446-8
- Softcover: ISBN 0-7851-1071-2

Spider-Man: Blue is a comic book limited series written by Jeph Loeb and illustrated by Tim Sale. It ran for a total of six issues and has been reprinted in trade paperback form. Loeb and Sale had also worked on the limited series: Daredevil: Yellow, Hulk: Gray and Captain America: White which also chronicle their respective Marvel Comics characters in their formative years.

== Plot ==
It is Valentine's Day, and Spider-Man describes himself as feeling "blue". Although Gwen Stacy, Parker's first love, died a while ago, he still feels blue for her to this day. So, Spider-Man recounts into a tape recorder how Gwen and he fell in love.

The series then recounts the events from The Amazing Spider-Man (vol. 1) #40–48 and #63, though it switches time order and implies that Kraven the Hunter, who appeared in #47, is behind all of the villains who attack Spider-Man. It retells Peter standing between Gwen and Mary Jane Watson, berated by his friend Harry Osborn.

In the end, it is St. Valentine's Day, and Gwen asks Peter to be her valentine. Peter states how her death has scarred him. Her one-time rival Mary Jane taught Peter to love again, but he reveals how much he misses Gwen. Suddenly, he notices his wife Mary Jane listening. Instead of being angry, Mary Jane feels deep sympathy for her husband and tells Peter to say hello to Gwen for her and to tell her how much she misses her, too.

== Collected editions ==
Title	Material collected	Published date	ISBN
Spider-Man: Blue	Spider-Man: Blue #1–6	January 2009	978-0785134466
Jeph Loeb & Tim Sale: Yellow, Blue and Gray Omnibus	Spider-Man: Blue #1–6 and Daredevil: Yellow #1–6, Hulk: Gray #1–6	August 2014	978-0785188315
Jeph Loeb & Tim Sale: Yellow, Blue, Gray & White Omnibus	Spider-Man: Blue #1–6 and Daredevil: Yellow #1–6, Hulk: Gray #1–6, Captain America: White #0-5	December 2018	978-1302914059

== In other media ==
- The comic book, along with The Kid Who Collects Spider-Man, served as the basis of the 2023 live-action fan film Spider-Man: Lotus. However, this adaptation was widely criticized for its writing and overly dramatic tone.
- On February 14, 2024, Josh Keaton reprised his role as Peter Parker / Spider-Man from the animated series The Spectacular Spider-Man in the animated fan film Spectacular Spider-Man Blue by Browntable, directly adapting the opening monologue segment of Spider-Man: Blue.
