= Outline of Spider-Man =

Overview of and topical guide to Spider-Man

The following outline is provided as an overview of and topical guide to Spider-Man:

Spider-Man is a superhero in American comic books published by Marvel Comics. Created by writer-editor Stan Lee and artist Steve Ditko, he first appeared in the anthology comic book Amazing Fantasy #15 (August 1962) in the Silver Age of Comic Books. Widely regarded as one of the most popular and commercially successful superheroes, he has been featured in comic books, television shows, films, video games, novels, and plays.

== Characters ==
=== Spider-Man ===
- Spider-Man (Peter Parker)
  - List of incarnations of Spider-Man
    - Ben Reilly
    - Kaine Parker
  - Alternative versions of Spider-Man
    - Spider-Man (Ultimate Marvel character)
    - Miles Morales
    - Spider-Man 2099
    - Spider-Man Noir
    - Spider-Woman (Gwen Stacy)
    - Spider-Man (Pavitr Prabhakar)
    - Spider-Ham
    - Mayday Parker

=== Spider-Man supporting characters ===
- List of Spider-Man supporting characters
  - Aunt May
  - Uncle Ben
  - Mary Jane Watson
  - Gwen Stacy
  - Harry Osborn
  - J. Jonah Jameson
  - Betty Brant
  - Flash Thompson
  - Robbie Robertson
  - Anna Watson
  - Black Cat

=== Spider-Man enemies ===
- List of Spider-Man enemies
  - Green Goblin (Norman Osborn)
  - Doctor Octopus
  - Venom (Eddie Brock)
  - Carnage (Cletus Kasady)
  - Vulture (Adrian Toomes)
  - Sandman
  - Mysterio
  - Kraven the Hunter
  - Kingpin
  - Lizard
  - Rhino
  - Scorpion (Mac Gargan)
  - Chameleon
  - Hobgoblin
  - Electro
  - Shocker (Herman Schultz)
  - Jackal
  - Morbius
  - Sinister Six

== Spider-Man in literature ==
- Spider-Man in literature

=== Comics ===
- List of Spider-Man comics
  - Amazing Fantasy #15
  - The Amazing Spider-Man
  - The Spectacular Spider-Man
  - Web of Spider-Man
  - Marvel Team-Up
  - Untold Tales of Spider-Man
  - Ultimate Spider-Man
  - Ultimate Comics: All-New Spider-Man
  - Spider-Man: India
  - The Superior Spider-Man

==== Storylines ====
- List of Spider-Man storylines
- "Green Goblin Reborn!"
- "The Night Gwen Stacy Died"
- "The Death of Jean DeWolff"
- "Kraven's Last Hunt"
- "Maximum Carnage"
- Clone Saga
- "The Other"
- Civil War
- "One More Day"
- "Brand New Day"
- Spider-Island
- "Dying Wish"
- Spider-Men
- Spider-Verse
- Renew Your Vows

=== Novels ===
- Spider-Man in novels
- Spider-Man book series
- Byron Preiss Multimedia
  - Diane Duane
    - The Venom Factor (1994)
    - The Lizard Sanction (1996)
    - The Octopus Agenda (1997)
- Marvel Press
  - Stefan Petrucha
    - Spider-Man: Forever Young
- Titan Books (Marvel Classic Novels)
  - Jim Butcher
    - The Darkest Hours
  - Keith R. A. DeCandido
    - Down These Mean Streets
  - Christopher L. Bennett
    - Drowned in Thunder
- Young adult fiction
  - Jason Reynolds
    - Miles Morales: Spider-Man (2017)

== Films ==
- 1977 Spider-Man
- 1978 Spider-Man Strikes Back
- 1981 Spider-Man: The Dragon's Challenge
- 2002 Spider-Man
- 2004 Spider-Man 2
- 2007 Spider-Man 3
- 2012 The Amazing Spider-Man
- 2014 The Amazing Spider-Man 2
- 2017 Spider-Man: Homecoming
- 2018 Venom; Spider-Man: Into the Spider-Verse
- 2019 Spider-Man: Far From Home
- 2021 Venom: Let There Be Carnage; Spider-Man: No Way Home
- 2022 Morbius
- 2023 Spider-Man: Across the Spider-Verse
- 2024 Madame Web; Kraven the Hunter; Venom: The Last Dance
- 2026 Spider-Man: Brand New Day
- 2027 Spider-Man: Beyond the Spider-Verse (upcoming)

People who have portrayed Spider-Man in films:

- Nicholas Hammond (1977-1981)
- Tobey Maguire (2002-2021)
- Andrew Garfield (2012-2021)
- Tom Holland (2016-present)
- Shameik Moore (2018-present)
- Chris Pine (2018)
- Jake Johnson (2018-present)
- Hailee Steinfeld (2018-present)
- John Mulaney (2018-present)
- Kimiko Glenn (2018-present)
- Nicolas Cage (2018-present)
- Oscar Isaac (2018-present)
- Issa Rae (2023-present)
- Karan Soni (2023-present)
- Daniel Kaluuya (2023-present)

== Television ==
=== Animated series ===
- Spider-Man (1967–1970)
- Spider-Man (1981–1982)
- Spider-Man and His Amazing Friends (1981–1983)
- Spider-Man: The Animated Series (1994–1998)
- Spider-Man Unlimited (1999–2001)
- Spider-Man: The New Animated Series (2003)
- The Spectacular Spider-Man (2008–2009)
- Ultimate Spider-Man (2012–2017)
- Marvel's Spider-Man (2017–2020)
- Marvel's Spidey and His Amazing Friends (2021–present)
- Your Friendly Neighborhood Spider-Man (2025–present)

=== Live-action series ===
- Spidey Super Stories (1974–1977)
- The Amazing Spider-Man (1977–1979)
- Spider-Man (1978–1979)
- Spider-Noir (2026)

== Persons influential for Spider-Man ==
- Stan Lee
- Steve Ditko
- John Romita Sr.
- Gerry Conway
- Roger Stern
- Tom DeFalco
- David Michelinie
- Todd McFarlane
- J. Michael Straczynski
- Dan Slott
- Brian Michael Bendis
- Sara Pichelli

== Video games ==
- List of video games featuring Spider-Man

=== Release timeline ===
- 1982 Spider-Man
- 1989 Spider-Man vs. The Kingpin
- 1992 Spider-Man: Return of the Sinister Six
- 1994 Spider-Man and Venom: Maximum Carnage
- 1995 Spider-Man and Venom: Separation Anxiety
- 2000 Spider-Man
- 2001 Spider-Man 2: Enter Electro
- 2002 Spider-Man: The Movie
- 2004 Spider-Man 2
- 2005 Ultimate Spider-Man
- 2007 Spider-Man 3; Spider-Man: Friend or Foe
- 2008 Spider-Man: Web of Shadows
- 2010 Spider-Man: Shattered Dimensions
- 2011 Spider-Man: Edge of Time
- 2012 The Amazing Spider-Man
- 2014 The Amazing Spider-Man 2; Spider-Man Unlimited
- 2018 Marvel's Spider-Man
- 2020 Marvel's Spider-Man: Miles Morales
- 2023 Marvel's Spider-Man 2
