= Spider-Man series =

Spider-Man series may refer to:

- List of Spider-Man titles, a list of Spider-Man comic book series
- Spider-Man television series, animation and live action on TV.
- Spider-Man book series, appearances in series of books
- Spider-Man in film, the Spider-Man motion pictures.
