= Spider-Man in novels =

Appearances of comic book character in novels

Since the character's inception in the 1960s, Spider-Man has appeared in several forms of media, including novels and book series.

== Original solo novels ==
=== The Amazing Spider-Man: Mayhem in Manhattan (1978) ===
No. 1 of the Marvel Pocket Novels. Written by Len Wein and Marv Wolfman. Doctor Octopus is blackmailing the top eight CEO's of various U.S. oil companies in order to get a stranglehold on U.S. oil. He also tries to convince those same CEO's that he has rendered their oil radioactive and thereby useless. For one year, they must secretly agree to buy oil from Doctor Octopus instead and, at the end of that time, they can go back to business as usual.

=== The Amazing Spider-Man: Crime Campaign (1979) ===
No. 8 of the Marvel Pocket Novels. Written by Paul Kupperberg. The plot concerns a TV anchorman whose daughter has been kidnapped by the Kingpin, who has forced the popular media frontsman to stand as Mayor. The Kingpin has taken millions of dollars from the other ganglords in order to cut them into his plan, which is to push his candidate into becoming Mayor. Peter Parker manages to convince J. Jonah Jameson into running for Mayor also. Secondly, Parker gets sent to cover a mayoral rally and thirdly, Silvermane's plan to secretly undermine the Kingpin's authority has him using a fake Spider-Man to threaten the Kingpin's candidate, and to lead the real Spider-Man into conflict with the Kingpin. While this is all happening, Jameson has hired private investigator Cindy Sayers to pretend to be his niece in order to find out how Peter Parker can get so many pictures of Spider-Man.

=== The Hulk and Spider-Man: Murdermoon (1979) ===
No. 11 of the Marvel Pocket Novels and a sequel to The Amazing Spider-Man: Crime Campaign, also written by Paul Kupperberg. The book begins with the Hulk fighting the U.S. military in a desert, but then cuts to Spider-Man intervening in a raid on a company doing research for NASA. After returning to the Daily Bugle, Spider-Man is immediately assigned to cover the latest StarLab spy satellite, which is due to drop back out of the sky. When the satellite vanishes from the radar, trouble arises. Meanwhile, Bruce Banner is reading a newspaper advertisement offering a potential treatment for his condition. He follows up on the ad, but finds himself kidnapped by the villain and, as the Hulk, is brainwashed into fighting Spider-Man.

=== Spider-Man: Carnage in New York (1995) ===
Written by David Michelinie and Dean Wesley Smith. A man named Catrall is on the run from the FBI because he has a serum that will drive anyone who comes into contact with it into a killer rage. He created the serum as a byproduct of studies designed to eliminate violent behavior. Meanwhile, an experiment is being run to try to kill the Carnage symbiote without killing Cletus Kasady, its host. Catrall shows up because he thinks that he can destroy the serum in the firewall that is holding Kasady. Catrall accidentally frees Carnage without destroying the serum. Carnage fights with Spider-Man, but escapes before he can be defeated. Spider-Man looks all over New York, finds Catrall, and finds out about the experiments that led to the serum and that Carnage found Catrall first, and took the serum. Carnage is planning to put the serum in a meal being made for some homeless people during a fundraiser being put together by J. Jonah Jameson. Spider-Man finds Carnage, fights in front of the audience, and then defeats Carnage. He takes the serum to Reed Richards to be kept out of the wrong hands.

=== Spider-Man: Goblin's Revenge (1996) ===
A sequel to Spider-Man: Carnage in New York also written by Dean Wesley Smith. After Spider-Man leaves the serum with Reed Richards, it is stolen by the Green Goblin. After the serum is stolen, Peter begins to have nightmares about New York being covered with blood. Peter is about to go insane, in part because of the serum, partly because of sightings of the supposedly dead Norman Osborn, and partly because the Goblin is about to push Mary Jane Watson off of the Brooklyn Bridge, in a scene that is designed to parallel the death of Gwen Stacy. The book ends with Spider-Man defeating both Carnage and the Goblin at the bridge and finding out the identity of the Goblin.

=== Spider-Man: Valley of the Lizard (1998) ===
Written by John Vornholt.

=== Spider-Man: Wanted: Dead or Alive (1998) ===
Written by Craig Shaw Gardner.

=== Spider-Man: Venom's Wrath (1998) ===
Written by Keith R.A. DeCandido and Jose R. Nieto.

=== Spider-Man: Goblin Moon (1999) ===
Written by Kurt Busiek and Nathan Archer.

=== Spider-Man: Emerald Mystery (2000) ===
Written by Dean Wesley Smith.

=== Spider-Man: Enter Doctor Octopus (2004) ===
Written by Louise A Gikow.

=== Spider-Man: Down These Mean Streets (2005) ===
Written by Keith R.A. DeCandido.

=== Spider-Man: The Darkest Hours (2006) ===
Written by Jim Butcher.

=== Spider-Man: Drowned in Thunder (2007) ===
Written by Christopher L. Bennett.

=== Spider-Man: Requiem (2008) ===
Written by Jeff Mariotte.

=== Spider-Man: Forever Young (2017) ===
Written by Stefan Petchura.

=== Spider-Man: Hostile Takeover (2018) ===
Written by David Liss.

=== Spider-Man: Miles Morales – Wings of Fury (2020) ===
Written by Brittney Morris.

== Spider-Man book series ==
=== Duane trilogy ===
Written by Diane Duane. The trilogy consists of the books, Spider-Man: The Venom Factor (1994), Spider-Man: The Lizard Sanction (1995) and Spider-Man: The Octopus Agenda (1996).

=== Spider-Man Super Thriller ===
A young adult novel series consisting of five books. Spider-Man: Midnight Justice (1996), Spider-Man: Deadly Cure (1996), Spider-Man: Global War (1997), Spider-Man: Lizard's Rage (1997) and Spider-Man: Warrior's Revenge (1997).

=== Doom's Day trilogy ===
Consists of the books Spider-Man and the Incredible Hulk: Doom's Day Book One: Rampage (1996), Spider-Man and Iron Man: Doom's Day Book Two: Sabotage (1997) and Spider-Man and Fantastic Four: Doom's Day Book Three: Wreckage (1997).

=== X-Men and Spider-Man: Time's Arrow ===
Consists of the books X-Men and Spider-Man: Time's Arrow Book 1: The Past (1998), X-Men and Spider-Man: Time's Arrow Book 2: The Present (1998) and X-Men and Spider-Man: Time's Arrow Book 3: The Future (1998).

=== Sinister Six trilogy ===
Written by Adam-Troy Castro. Consists of the books Spider-Man: The Gathering of the Sinister Six (1999), Spider-Man: Revenge of the Sinister Six (2001) and Spider-Man: Secret of the Sinister Six (2002).

== Film novelizations and comic adaptations ==
=== Spider-Man (2002) ===
Written by Peter David.

=== Spider-Man 2 (2004) ===
Written by David.

=== Spider-Man 3 (2007) ===
Written by Peter David.

=== Spider-Man: Kraven's Last Hunt (2014) ===
Written by Neil Kleid, this is an adaptation of the comic book storyline "Kraven's Last Hunt".

== Spin-offs ==
=== Mary Jane (2003) ===
A young adult novel written by Judith O'Brien that serves as the origin of Spider-Man through Mary Jane Watson's eyes.

=== Mary Jane 2 (2004) ===
A sequel to the first Mary Jane book, also written by Judith O'Brien.

== Appearances in other novels ==
- Spider-Man appears in the book New Avengers: Break-Out from 2013 by Alisa Kwitney.
- Spider-Man appears in the prose novel adaptation of the Civil War storyline.

== See also ==
- List of novels based on comics
