= List of actors who have played Spider-Man =

The following is a list of actors who have played Spider-Man in various media. It primarily features portrayals of Peter Parker, but also includes performances of other characters who have assumed the Spider-Man mantle, such as Miles Morales and Miguel O'Hara, and characters with related monikers such as Spider-Gwen and Spider-Punk.

== Radio and audio dramas ==
Name	Title	Date	Type
William Dufris	The Amazing Spider-Man	1995	BBC Radio series
Teo Rapp-Olsson	Marvels	2019	Scripted podcast
Paul Scheer	Marvel's Squirrel Girl: The Unbeatable Radio Show	2022	Scripted podcast

== Stage plays ==
Name	Title	Date	Type and location
Reeve Carney	Spider-Man: Turn Off the Dark	2010–2013	Stage musical (Broadway)
Matthew James Thomas	Spider-Man: Turn Off the Dark	2010–2012	Alternate
Matt Caplan	Spider-Man: Turn Off the Dark	2011–2012	Understudy
Matthew Wilkas	Spider-Man: Turn Off the Dark	2012	Understudy/Alternate
Jake Epstein	Spider-Man: Turn Off the Dark	2012–2013	Alternate

== Theatrical films ==
Name	Title	Date	Type	Character Portrayed
Tobey Maguire	Spider-Man	2002	"Raimiverse" film series	Peter Parker
Tobey Maguire	Spider-Man 2	2004	"Raimiverse" film series	Peter Parker
Tobey Maguire	Spider-Man 3	2007	"Raimiverse" film series	Peter Parker
Tobey Maguire	Spider-Man: No Way Home	2021	Marvel Cinematic Universe	Peter Parker
Andrew Garfield	The Amazing Spider-Man	2012	"Webbverse" film series	Peter Parker
Andrew Garfield	The Amazing Spider-Man 2	2014	"Webbverse" film series	Peter Parker
Andrew Garfield	Spider-Man: No Way Home	2021	Marvel Cinematic Universe	Peter Parker
Tom Holland	Captain America: Civil War	2016	Marvel Cinematic Universe	Peter Parker
Tom Holland	Spider-Man: Homecoming	2017	Marvel Cinematic Universe	Peter Parker
Tom Holland	Avengers: Infinity War	2018	Marvel Cinematic Universe	Peter Parker
Tom Holland	Avengers: Endgame	2019	Marvel Cinematic Universe	Peter Parker
Tom Holland	Spider-Man: Far From Home	2019	Marvel Cinematic Universe	Peter Parker
Tom Holland	Venom: Let There Be Carnage	2021	Sony's Spider-Man Universe	Peter Parker
Tom Holland	Spider-Man: No Way Home	2021	Marvel Cinematic Universe	Peter Parker
Tom Holland	Spider-Man: Brand New Day	2026	Marvel Cinematic Universe	Peter Parker
Shameik Moore (Note: as Miles Morales)	Spider-Man: Into the Spider-Verse	2018	"Spider-Verse" franchise	Miles Morales
Shameik Moore	Spider-Man: Across the Spider-Verse	2023	"Spider-Verse" franchise	Miles Morales
Shameik Moore	Spider-Man: Beyond the Spider-Verse	2027	"Spider-Verse" franchise	Miles Morales
Jake Johnson	Spider-Man: Into the Spider-Verse	2018	"Spider-Verse" franchise	Peter B. Parker
Jake Johnson	Spider-Man: Across the Spider-Verse	2023	"Spider-Verse" franchise	Peter B. Parker
Hailee Steinfeld (Note: as Gwen Stacy/Spider-Gwen/Spider-Woman)	Spider-Man: Into the Spider-Verse	2018	"Spider-Verse" franchise	Gwen Stacy
Hailee Steinfeld	Spider-Man: Across the Spider-Verse	2023	"Spider-Verse" franchise	Gwen Stacy
Hailee Steinfeld	Spider-Man: Beyond the Spider-Verse	2027	"Spider-Verse" franchise	Gwen Stacy
John Mulaney (Note: as Peter Porker/Spider-Ham)	Spider-Man: Into the Spider-Verse	2018	"Spider-Verse" franchise	Peter Porker
John Mulaney	Spider-Man: Across the Spider-Verse	2023	"Spider-Verse" franchise	Peter Porker
John Mulaney	Spider-Man: Beyond the Spider-Verse	2027	"Spider-Verse" franchise	Peter Porker
Kimiko Glenn (Note: as Peni Parker)	Spider-Man: Into the Spider-Verse	2018	"Spider-Verse" franchise	Peni Parker
Kimiko Glenn	Spider-Man: Across the Spider-Verse	2023	"Spider-Verse" franchise	Peni Parker
Kimiko Glenn	Spider-Man: Beyond the Spider-Verse	2027	"Spider-Verse" franchise	Peni Parker
Nicolas Cage (Note: as Peter Parker/Spider-Man Noir)	Spider-Man: Into the Spider-Verse	2018	"Spider-Verse" franchise	Peter Parker (Spider-Noir)
Chris Pine	Spider-Man: Into the Spider-Verse	2018	"Spider-Verse" franchise	Peter Parker
Oscar Isaac (Note: as Miguel O'Hara/Spider-Man 2099)	Spider-Man: Into the Spider-Verse	2018	"Spider-Verse" franchise	Miguel O'Hara
Oscar Isaac	Spider-Man: Across the Spider-Verse	2023	"Spider-Verse" franchise	Miguel O'Hara
Jorma Taccone	Spider-Man: Into the Spider-Verse	2018	"Spider-Verse" franchise	Peter Parker (1967 Animated)
Jorma Taccone	Spider-Man: Across the Spider-Verse	2023	"Spider-Verse" franchise	Peter Parker (1967 Animated)
Daniel Kaluuya (Note: as Hobie Brown/Spider-Punk)	Spider-Man: Across the Spider-Verse	2023	"Spider-Verse" franchise	Hobie Brown
Daniel Kaluuya	Spider-Man: Beyond the Spider-Verse	2027	"Spider-Verse" franchise	Hobie Brown
Karan Soni (Note: as Pavitr Prabhakar/Spider-Man India)	Spider-Man: Across the Spider-Verse	2023	"Spider-Verse" franchise	Pavitr Prabhakar
Karan Soni	Spider-Man: Beyond the Spider-Verse	2027	"Spider-Verse" franchise	Pavitr Prabhakar
Nic Novicki	Spider-Man: Across the Spider-Verse	2023	"Spider-Verse" franchise	Peter Parker (Lego)
Josh Keaton	Spider-Man: Across the Spider-Verse	2023	"Spider-Verse" franchise	Peter Parker
Yuri Lowenthal	Spider-Man: Across the Spider-Verse	2023	"Spider-Verse" franchise	Peter Parker

== Web originals and motion comics ==
Name	Title	Date	Type
Geoff Boothby	Spider-Woman: Agent of S.W.O.R.D.	2009	Motion comic

== See also ==
- Spider-Man (franchise)
