= Spider-Man in other media =

Adaptations of Spider-Man in other media
- Spider-Man as depicted in other various adaptions
- Original source: Comics published by Marvel Comics
- First appearance: Amazing Fantasy #15 (August 1962)

Print publications
- Novel(s): List: Spider-Man: Mayhem in Manhattan (1978) The Amazing Spider-Man: Crime Campaign (1979) The Hulk and Spider-Man: Murdermoon (1979) The Ultimate Spider-Man (1994) Spider-Man: The Venom Factor (1994) Spider-Man: Carnage in New York (1995) Spider-Man: The Lizard Sanction (1995) Spider-Man: Midnight Justice (1996) Spider-Man: Deadly Cure (1996) Spider-Man and the Incredible Hulk: Doom's Day Book One: Rampage (1996) Spider-Man: Goblin's Revenge (1996) Spider-Man: The Octopus Agenda (1996) Spider-Man: Global War (1997) Spider-Man: Lizard's Rage (1997) Spider-Man and Iron Man: Doom's Day Book Two: Sabotage (1997) Spider-Man: Warrior's Revenge (1997) Untold Tales of Spider-Man (1997) Spider-Man and Fantastic Four: Doom's Day Book Three: Wreckage (1997) Spider-Man: Valley of the Lizard (1998) Spider-Man: Wanted: Dead or Alive (1998) X-Men and Spider-Man: Time's Arrow Book 1: The Past (1998) X-Men and Spider-Man: Time's Arrow Book 2: The Present (1998) X-Men and Spider-Man: Time's Arrow Book 3: The Future (1998) Spider-Man: Venom's Wrath (1998) Spider-Man: The Gathering of the Sinister Six (1999) Spider-Man: Goblin Moon (1999) Spider-Man: Emerald Mystery (2000) Spider-Man: Revenge of the Sinister Six (2001) Spider-Man: The Secret of the Sinister Six (2002) Spider-Man (2002) Spider-Man 2 (2004) Spider-Man: Enter Doctor Octopus (2004) Spider-Man: Down These Mean Streets (2005) Spider-Man: The Darkest Hours (2006) Spider-Man 3 (2007) Spider-Man: Drowned in Thunder (2007) Spider-Man: Requiem (2008) Spider-Man: Kraven's Last Hunt (2014)
- Reference book(s): The Amazing Spider-Man: The Ultimate Guide (2007)

Films and television
- Film(s): List: Spider-Man (1977) Spider-Man (1978) Spider-Man Strikes Back (1978) Spider-Man: The Dragon's Challenge (1981) Spider-Man (2002) Spider-Man 2 (2004) Spider-Man 3 (2007) Iron Man 2 (2010) The Amazing Spider-Man (2012) The Amazing Spider-Man 2 (2014) Captain America: Civil War (2016) Spider-Man: Homecoming (2017) Avengers: Infinity War (2018) Spider-Man: Into the Spider-Verse (2018) Avengers: Endgame (2019) Spider-Man: Far From Home (2019) Venom: Let There Be Carnage (2021) Spider-Man: No Way Home (2021) Spider-Man: Across the Spider-Verse (2023)
- Television show(s): Spider-Man (1967–1970); Spidey Super Stories (1974–1975); The Amazing Spider-Man (1977–1979); Spider-Man (1978–1979); Spider-Man (1981–1982); Spider-Man and His Amazing Friends (1981–1983); Spider-Man (1994–1998); Spider-Man Unlimited (1999–2001); Spider-Man: The New Animated Series (2003); The Spectacular Spider-Man (2008–2009); Ultimate Spider-Man (2012–2017); Spider-Man (2017–2020); Spidey and His Amazing Friends (2021–present); Your Friendly Neighborhood Spider-Man (2025–present)

Theatrical presentations
- Play(s): Spider-Man's wedding (1987); Spider-Man Live! (2002)
- Musical(s): Spider-Man: Turn Off the Dark (2011)

Audio presentations
- Radio show(s): Spider-Man (1996)
- Soundtrack(s): List: Spider-Man: From Beyond the Grave (1972) Music from and Inspired by Spider-Man (2002) Spider-Man: Original Motion Picture Score (2002) Spider-Man 2 (2004) Spider-Man 3 (2007) The Amazing Spider-Man (2012) The Amazing Spider-Man 2 (2014)

Games
- Video game(s): List: Spider-Man (1982) The Amazing Spider-Man (1990) Spider-Man (2000) Ultimate Spider-Man (2005) Spider-Man: Web of Shadows (2008) Spider-Man: Shattered Dimensions (2010) Spider-Man (2018)

Spider-Man is a superhero from Marvel Comics who has been adapted and appeared in various media including television shows, films, toys, stage shows, books, and video games.

== Television ==
Spider-Man has been adapted to television many times, as a short-lived live-action television series, a Japanese tokusatsu series, and several animated cartoon series. There were also the "Spidey Super Stories" segments on the PBS educational series The Electric Company, which featured a Spider-Man (played by Danny Seagren) who did not speak out loud but instead used only word balloons.

=== Animated series ===
- Spider-Man appears in a self-titled series (1967), voiced by Paul Soles.
- Spider-Man appears in Spider-Woman, voiced again by Paul Soles.
- Spider-Man appears in a self-titled series (1981), voiced by Ted Schwartz.
- Spider-Man appears in Spider-Man and His Amazing Friends, voiced by Dan Gilvezan. This version is a member of the titular group, alongside Iceman and Firestar.
- Spider-Man appears in a self-titled series (1994), voiced by Christopher Daniel Barnes.
- Spider-Man makes a non-speaking cameo appearance in the X-Men: The Animated Series episode "Child of Light".
- Spider-Man appears in Spider-Man Unlimited (1999), voiced by Rino Romano. This version's suit was made using nanotechnology and possesses stealth technology and anti-symbiote sonic weaponry.
- Spider-Man appears in Spider-Man: The New Animated Series, voiced by Neil Patrick Harris.
- Peter Parker appears in the Fantastic Four: World's Greatest Heroes episode "Frightful", voiced by Sam Vincent. This version is a freelance photographer.
- Spider-Man appears in The Spectacular Spider-Man, voiced by Josh Keaton.
- Spider-Man appears in The Avengers: Earth's Mightiest Heroes, voiced by Drake Bell.
- Spider-Man appears in Ultimate Spider-Man, voiced again by Drake Bell. This version is a member of S.H.I.E.L.D. and the leader of a group of trainees consisting of Iron Fist, Nova, Luke Cage and White Tiger.
- Spider-Man appears in Marvel Mash-Up: Spider-Man and His Amazing Friends, voiced by Dave Boat.
- Spider-Man appears in Avengers Assemble, voiced again by Drake Bell in the first and second seasons and by Robbie Daymond in the fifth.
- Spider-Man appears in Phineas and Ferb: Mission Marvel, voiced again by Drake Bell.
- Spider-Man appears in Hulk and the Agents of S.M.A.S.H. voiced again by Drake Bell.
- Spider-Man appears in Marvel Disk Wars: The Avengers, voiced by Shinji Kawada in Japanese and Robbie Daymond in English.
- Spider-Man appears in a self-titled series (2017), voiced by Robbie Daymond. This version is a student of Horizon High.
- Spider-Man appears in Guardians of the Galaxy, voiced again by Robbie Daymond.
- Spider-Man appears in Marvel Super Hero Adventures, voiced by Cole Howard.
- Spider-Man appears in Marvel Future Avengers, reprised by Shinji Kawada in Japanese and Robbie Daymond in English.
- Spider-Man (known as Spidey) appears in Spidey and His Amazing Friends, voiced initially by Benjamin Valic and by Alkaio Thiele from the third season onward.
- Spider-Man appears in three Marvel Cinematic Universe (MCU) Disney+ animated series.
  - What If...? (2021-2024) features an alternate version marketed "Zombie Hunter Spidey", voiced by Hudson Thames instead of Tom Holland due to contractual conflicts.
  - The Peter Parker that appeared in What If...? (2021-2024) also appears in the television series Marvel Zombies (2025), with Hudson reprising his role from the former. This also marks the first time that Spider-Man appears in a Marvel project that is rated TV-MA.
  - The character appears in Your Friendly Neighborhood Spider-Man, an animated series set in an alternate timeline of the MCU.
- Spider-Man makes a non-speaking cameo appearance in the X-Men '97 episode "Tolerance Is Extinction - Part 1".
- A stand-in for Spider-Man known as Agent Spider appears in Season 2 of Amazon's Invincible and tie-in video games such as Invincible VS.

=== Live-action series ===
- Spider-Man appears in The Amazing Spider-Man (1977), portrayed by Nicholas Hammond. The short-lived series, which had started out as a TV film in 1977, was created before the popular The Incredible Hulk television series of the same decade, and ran for two seasons consisting of 13 episodes during the 1977/1978 and 1978/1979 seasons. The series concluded with a two-hour episode on July 6, 1979.
- Takuya Yamashiro (山城拓也, Yamashiro Takuya) is Spider-Man in the Japanese Spider-Man television series, produced by Toei Company.
- Spider-Noir is a live action series primarily featuring Spider-Noir (called ‘The Spider’ due to licensing agreements). This live-action series also is part of the Sony’s Spider-Man Universe, but is set in an alternate timeline. Nicolas Cage stars as Ben Reilly / The Spider in the series.

== Film ==
=== Live-action ===
==== Early films ====
- Nicholas Hammond portrayed the character in the 1970s The Amazing Spider-Man TV series, with three films being theatrically released in Europe from 1977 to 1981.
  - Spider-Man (1977)
  - Spider-Man Strikes Back (1978)
  - Spider-Man: The Dragon's Challenge (1981)
- Spider-Man (1978) is a Japanese film based on the 1978 TV series of the same name, starring the alternate Spider-Man Takuya Yamishiro.

==== Sam Raimi's Spider-Man series ====
Tobey Maguire as Peter Parker/Spider-Man in Sam Raimi's Spider-Man trilogy

- In 2002, Columbia Pictures released the origin feature film Spider-Man, beginning a trilogy directed solely by Raimi. The film stars Tobey Maguire as the titular character, with Willem Dafoe co starring as Norman Osborn / Green Goblin.
- Maguire reprised his role in the 2004 sequel Spider-Man 2, adapting elements from the comic book storyline "Spider-Man No More!". Alfred Molina co-stars as Otto Octavius / Doctor Octopus.
- Maguire further reprised his role as Spider-Man in Spider-Man 3 (2007), which ultimately ended the trilogy. Thomas Haden Church, James Franco, and Topher Grace co-star as Flint Marko / Sandman, Harry Osborn / New Goblin, (Note: Only named "New Goblin" in promotional material and the credits.) and Eddie Brock / Venom, respectively.
- From 2008 to 2010, Sony and Raimi were developing further sequels to Spider-Man 3. However, many issues surfaced over Spider-Man 4, leading Sony to cancel it in 2010. 4 was originally scheduled to release in 2011.

==== The Amazing Spider-Man film series ====
- Following the cancellation of Spider-Man 4, Sony rebooted the series with The Amazing Spider-Man (2012), directed by Marc Webb. In July 2010, Andrew Garfield was cast as the titular character, co-starring with Rhys Ifans as Dr. Curt Connors / Lizard, and Emma Stone as love interest Gwen Stacy.
  - Max Charles portrayed a young Peter Parker in the opening scene of the film.
- Sony planned The Amazing Spider-Man to start a shared universe, competing with other studios' universes (such as the Marvel Cinematic Universe (MCU) franchise), with The Amazing Spider-Man 2 (2014). Garfield and Stone reprise their roles while co-starring with Jamie Foxx, Dane DeHaan, and Paul Giamatti as Max Dillon / Electro, Harry Osborn / Green Goblin, and Aleksei Sytsevich / Rhino, respectively.
  - Charles also reprised the role of young Parker.
- Following the underwhelming box office performance and critical reception of The Amazing Spider-Man 2, Sony cancelled their shared universe and the proposed Sinister Six spinoff, originally scheduled for 2016 and 2018, respectively.

==== Marvel Cinematic Universe ====
Sony, Marvel Studios and The Walt Disney Company announced in February 2015 a deal for Spider-Man to appear in the MCU, with Tom Holland portraying the character.

- Before his official debut in Captain America: Civil War (2016), Parker previously appears and is referenced:
  - In Iron Man 2 (2010), Max Favreau, son of director Jon Favreau, portrays a young boy in a child's Iron Man mask standing bravely in front of Justin Hammer's drones. Holland confirmed in 2017 that it was retroactively decided the boy was a young Parker.
  - The first reference to Spider-Man within the Marvel Cinematic Universe following the deal with Sony is at the end of Ant-Man (2015). According to director Peyton Reed, the reference is made by a reporter who says to Sam Wilson (who is looking for Ant-Man), "Well, we got everything nowadays. We got a guy who jumps, we got a guy who swings, we got a guy who crawls up the walls, you gotta be more specific".
- Peter Parker's first on-screen MCU appearance is in Captain America: Civil War (2016), when Tony Stark recruits him to fight alongside his faction of the Avengers during the Avengers Civil War. In the post-credits scene, he fiddles with a device that projects the Spider Signal on the ceiling of his bedroom.
- In Spider-Man: Homecoming, directed by Jon Watts, Parker balances his high school life with his duties as Spider-Man, while being mentored by Tony Stark and battling Adrian Toomes / Vulture. The Spider-Man suit that he gained from Stark has its own AI, which he names Karen (voiced by Jennifer Connelly).
- Holland reprises his role as Peter Parker / Spider-Man in the two-part conclusion to Phase Three, the two Avengers films Avengers: Infinity War (2018) and Avengers: Endgame (2019).
  - In Infinity War, Parker joins Stark, Stephen Strange, Peter Quill, Drax, Mantis and Nebula in combating Thanos on the planet Titan while wearing the Iron Spider armor and later becomes a victim of the Blip.
  - In Endgame, Spider-Man restored to life right before the Battle of Earth, to which he fights in the battle, which results in Stark sacrificing himself to kill Thanos and his army. Peter later mourns his mentor's loss alongside James Rhodes and Pepper Potts, attending his funeral with his aunt May.
- Holland reprises his role in Spider-Man: Far From Home (2019), following him on a school trip to Europe where Nick Fury and Quentin Beck enlist his help in battling the Elementals, before discovering this lie. In a mid-credits scene, he is framed for Mysterio's drone attack in London and his identity is exposed to the world by J. Jonah Jameson of TheDailyBugle.net.
  - The home media release of Far From Home features a short film titled Peter's To-Do List, which were scenes cut from the theatrical release.
- Holland reprises his role in Spider-Man: No Way Home (2021), following Parker after his identity being exposed in Far From Home. The film deals with the concept of the Multiverse, allowing previous Spider-Man actors to reprise their roles such as Maguire and Garfield to their versions of the character, named "Peter-Two" and "Peter-Three" respectively to differentiate from Holland's Parker ("Peter-One"), ultimately appearing with Dafoe, Molina, Church, Ifans, and Foxx also reprising their roles of Osborn, Octavius, Marko, Connors, and Dillon from the Raimi and Amazing Spider-Man films.
- Holland reprised the role in Spider-Man: Brand New Day (2026), following Parker after everyone's memories of his civilian life were erased in No Way Home.

==== Sony's Spider-Man Universe ====
- The MCU incarnation of Spider-Man makes an uncredited cameo appearance in the mid-credits scene of the Sony's Spider-Man Universe film Venom: Let There Be Carnage, portrayed again by Tom Holland.
- An infant Peter Parker makes a cameo appearance in Madame Web.

=== Animation ===
- Spider-Man appears in the Lego Marvel Super Heroes films.
  - The character debuts in Maximum Overload, voiced by Drake Bell.
  - In Avengers Reassembled, Spider-Man is voiced by Benjamin Diskin.
  - In Lego Marvel Spider-Man: Vexed by Venom, Spider-Man is voiced by Robbie Daymond.
  - In Lego Marvel Avengers: Climate Conundrum, Spider-Man is voiced by Cole Howard.
- A main and Noir versions of Peter Parker / Spider-Man appear in Spider-Man: Into the Spider-Verse (2018), produced by Sony Pictures Animation and directed by Bob Persichetti; respectively voiced by Jake Johnson and Nicolas Cage. Chris Pine also voices a version of Peter Parker in the film that is similar to his Earth-1610 counterpart. Johnson voices the main version in the sequel Spider-Man: Across the Spider-Verse (2023). Several alternate universe variations of the character appear, including the Spider-Man Unlimited version, the Spider-Man (1967) version (voiced by Jorma Taccone), Lego Spider-Man (voiced by Nic Noviki), The Spectacular Spider-Man version (voiced again by Josh Keaton), the Insomniac series' version (voiced again by Yuri Lowenthal), and the Earth-65 version (voiced by Jack Quaid), who became his universe's Lizard.

== Audio ==
Spider Man made an appearance in a 1966 Golden Record entitled The Amazing Spider Man #1, an audio dramatisation of the eponymous issue.

In 1972, Marvel released Spider Man: From Beyond the Grave: A Rockomic, a musical audio drama.

In 1974, Power Records produced an audio dramatisation of Amazing Spider Man #124.

In 1985, EMI Records produced dramatised audio adaptations of Amazing Spider Man issues #11-#12, and Amazing Spider Man Annual #18. These were adapted by Philip Evans, with music composed by Mike Duff and Andy Butler and they were recorded in Gloucester.

In 1990, audio dramatisations of issues #303 and #319 were created by Shan-Lon Enterprises as part of their Read-Along cassette line.

Veteran British audio drama creator Dirk Maggs produced The Amazing Spider-Man in 1995 for BBC Radio. The theme music was notably made by Queen band member Brian May. Originally airing as a series of 50 three-minute episodes, it was later released as a single 120 minute episode on CD.

In the 2019 scripted podcast Marvels, Spider-Man is voiced by Teo Rapp-Olsson.

Spider-Man appears in the 2022 scripted podcast Marvel's Squirrel Girl: The Unbeatable Radio Show, where he is voiced by Paul Scheer.

== Novels and books ==
Spider-Man features in three original Marvel novels published in the 1970s by Pocket Books -- Mayhem in Manhattan by Len Wein and Marv Wolfman, and Crime Campaign and Murder Moon, both by Paul Kupperberg. In the 1990s, Byron Preiss published a series of novels based on Marvel Comics, edited by Keith R. A. DeCandido, and written by various authors including Adam-Troy Castro, Tom DeFalco, and Diane Duane; Preiss also published two Spider-Man short-story anthologies. Byron Preiss' license eventually lapsed, and the new licensee, Pocket Star (an imprint of Pocket Books), released Down These Mean Streets, by DeCandido, in 2005. In 2006, they released The Darkest Hours by Jim Butcher, and in 2007, Drowned in Thunder by Christopher L. Bennett. Some of the Preiss novels were team-ups with other Marvel characters (including the X-Men, Iron Man, and the Hulk), while others were solo adventures. The Byron Preiss novels shared a common continuity and occasionally referenced events in earlier novels, while later novels included a time-line.

A number of Spider-Man children's books have also been published, from early readers and picture books to novels. Guide books include DK Publishing's Spider-Man: The Ultimate Guide, by Tom DeFalco and Spider-Man: Inside the World of Your Friendly Neighborhood Hero by Matthew K. Manning.

== Motion comics ==
Spider-Man appears in the Spider-Woman motion comics. In this series, he is voiced by Geoff Boothby.

== Comic strips ==
- The daily newspaper comic strip The Amazing Spider-Man debuted on January 3, 1977.
- Mr. and Mrs. Spider-Man was published in 2008.
- Spider-Man met the Peanuts characters in two strips published in The Romita Legacy. In one, Spider-Man webs up Lucy so Charlie Brown can kick the football while in the other he webs up Snoopy and spins him around as a prank.

== Radio ==
In 1995, BBC Radio commissioned a Spider-Man radio play which aired on BBC Radio 1 over 50 episodes on week days between January 15, 1996, and March 24, 1996. The performance was co-produced by Brian May, who also contributed to the musical arrangement and wrote and performed the theme tune.

The scope of the story included a number of familiar characters from the Spider-Man comic books as well as key figures from the Marvel Universe such as the Fantastic Four, Namor the Submariner, and Doctor Doom. The role of Spider-Man was performed by William Dufris. The cast list included EastEnders star Anita Dobson.

== Live performances ==
Spider-Man: Turn Off the Dark promotional poster

In 1987, Marvel staged a mock wedding at Shea Stadium as publicity stunt to promote the wedding issue of The Amazing Spider-Man.

A Spider-Man balloon appeared in the Macy's Thanksgiving Day Parade from 1987 to 1998. A newer version also appeared from 2009 to 2014. Spider-Man also appears as a costume character on the Disney Cruise Line float starting in 2022.

At the Butlins family entertainment resorts in the United Kingdom, a musical titled Spider-Man On Stage played in 1999. The show contained music by Henry Marsh and Phil Pickett and a book and lyrics by David H. Bell. The original cast album by Varios Records runs 44 minutes.

In 2002, the company 2MA produced the first live-action Spider-Man Stunt Show, Spider-Man Stunt Show: A Stunt Spectacular staged in Jeddah, Saudi Arabia. The same show played at Thorpe Park in Surrey, England in 2003 and 2004. Spider-Man has also made stage appearances in Pantomime at the Birmingham Hippodrome Theatre and the Churchill Theatre, Bromley, United Kingdom. In 2003 a similar stage show called Spider-Man Live! toured North America.

At Universal Studios Hollywood in Los Angeles, a musical stage version (loosely based on the 2002 live-action film and based on the comics) titled Spider-Man Rocks! was produced, combined singing and action stunt sequences similar to a Broadway musical. The attraction ran from May 2002 to August 2004, when it was replaced by Fear Factor Live! Because it is loosely based on the 2002 film, Green Goblin is in a costume reminiscent of his comic book appearances rather than the film costume.

A Broadway musical titled Spider-Man: Turn Off the Dark opened at the Foxwoods Theatre in New York on June 14, 2011. The show is directed by Julie Taymor and features music by Bono and The Edge. The production stars Reeve Carney, Jennifer Damiano, T.V. Carpio and Patrick Page. The musical is the most expensive piece of live theatre to date, and features high-flying action sequences and stunts. It holds the record for the most preview performances, with 182 before its opening. In March 2011, an Off-Broadway parody production entitled "Spidermusical" was performed for a week; it garnered favorable attention for being written and staged, all during Turn Off the Dark's troubled and highly publicized preview process.

Spider-Man is featured in Marvel Universe Live!, a 2014 arena show.

Spider-Man, and other Marvel characters, currently make live appearances in Avengers Campus at Disney California Adventure, Walt Disney Studios Park, and Hong Kong Disneyland. He also makes appearances in Marvel Super Hero Island at Universal Islands of Adventure

== Video games ==
Dozens of computer and video games starring Spider-Man have been released for over 15 different gaming platforms.

The Amazing Spider-Man, a puzzle-oriented action game developed by Oxford Digital Enterprises and released in 1990 for the Amiga, then later ported to MS-DOS, Commodore 64, and Atari ST. The title was published by Paragon Software Corporation and features over 250 screens.

In 1990, Spider-Man vs. The Kingpin, developed and published by Sega, premiered on the Master System and was later ported to the Mega Drive/Genesis in 1991, the Game Gear in 1992, and the Mega-CD in 1993. Fundamentally, the game is the same on each platform with each iteration including new levels, enhanced graphics and a few incremental improvements to the game play. The story involves Spider-Man trying to collect six keys from six villains to defuse a bomb in New York planted by the Kingpin. Spider-Man has a finite supply of webfluid and the only way to replenish is to take photos, most profitably of the supervillains, to sell to the Daily Bugle.

The Amazing Spider-Man was developed by Rare and released for the Game Boy in 1990 by LJN. It is a scrolling platform game where Spider-Main chases supervillains across New York to locate Mary Jane Watson.

The Amazing Spider-Man 2 was released the following year and was developed by B.I.T.S. The game is a side-scrolling beat-'em up. Spider-Man attempts to clear his name after he is accused of a crime committed by the Hobgoblin. In 1993, B.I.T.S. released the third in the series titled, The Amazing Spider-Man 3: Invasion of the Spider-Slayers.

As well as various games based on the Spider-Man license, Spider-Man has also appeared in a few cross-over titles. He appears as a guest character in X-Men: Mutant Academy 2 and Tony Hawk's Pro Skater 2.

Spider-Man appears in Marvel: Ultimate Alliance voiced by Quinton Flynn. He is one of the main heroes that help Nick Fury fight Doctor Doom's Masters of Evil. Spider-Man appears in its sequel Marvel: Ultimate Alliance 2 voiced by Benjamin Diskin.

He is also a playable character in Capcom's series of Marvel-based fighting games, first appearing in Marvel Super Heroes as well as every game in the Marvel vs. Capcom series of games starting from Marvel Super Heroes vs. Street Fighter. For Marvel Super Heroes and the first two games, he was voiced by Patrick Chilvers. But for the next one which was entitled Ultimate Marvel vs. Capcom 3, he was voiced by Josh Keaton and for the 2017 game Marvel vs. Capcom: Infinite, he was voiced by Robbie Daymond.

While not appearing in the main series due to licensing issues from Sony, Spider-Man appears in Marvel Super Hero Squad, Marvel Super Hero Squad: The Infinity Gauntlet, and Marvel Super Hero Squad Online as a playable character. For Marvel Super Hero Squad and Marvel Super Hero Squad: The Infinity Gauntlet, he is voiced by Josh Keaton and for Marvel Super Hero Squad Online, all male Spider-Man characters are voiced by Mikey Kelley and Yuri Lowenthal. He appears as a playable character in the Facebook game Marvel Avengers Alliance and its companion games Marvel: Avengers Alliance Tactics and Marvel: Avengers Alliance 2.

Spider-Man appears as a non-playable character in the 2003 game, X2: Wolverine's Revenge voiced again by an uncredited Rino Romano. In a deleted scene, Wolverine encounters Spider-Man off of his home turf. Spider-Man states that he heard about the big breakout at the Void and rode out to the town on the charter bus with the other superheroes who can't fly or teleport. When Spider-Man asks if Wolverine needs help fighting Magneto, Wolverine has him deal with the chaos in town until Damage Control arrives.

Spider-Man is a playable character in the 2014 and 2015 games Disney Infinity: Marvel Super Heroes and Disney Infinity 3.0, with Drake Bell reprising his role from the 2012 Ultimate Spider-Man series.

The Amazing Spider-Man is a game based on the 2012 film of the same name for the PlayStation 3 and the Xbox 360. A sequel, The Amazing Spider-Man 2, was released in 2014 along with the film of the same name. Spider-Man is voiced by Sam Riegel for both of these games.

A new Spider-Man video game was announced during the Sony Electronic Entertainment Expo 2016 Press Conference under the working title "Spider-Man PS4" with the hashtag #spidermanPS4. Yuri Lowenthal reprises his role as Spider-Man from Marvel Super Hero Squad Online and Spider-Man Unlimited. It was developed by Insomniac Games and released on September 7, 2018 for PlayStation 4 (Note: With further releases on PlayStation 5 on November 12, 2020 and Microsoft Windows on August 12, 2022) to critical and commercial success, becoming the best-selling PlayStation 4 game of all time. The game was followed by a three-episode DLC titled Marvel's Spider-Man: The City That Never Sleeps, and two sequels, Marvel's Spider-Man: Miles Morales, released in 2020, (Note: With a further release on Microsoft Windows on November 18, 2022) and Marvel's Spider-Man 2, released in 2023.

Spider-Man appears as a playable character in various mobile games including Marvel Future Fight, Marvel Contest of Champions, Marvel Puzzle Quest, and Marvel Strike Force.

== Attractions ==
- Spider-Man headlines as the main protagonist in 1999's The Amazing Adventures of Spider-Man attraction located at Universal Orlando's Islands of Adventure in Orlando, Florida and formerly Universal Studios Japan in Osaka, Japan. The ride is considered to be one of the most groundbreaking in theme park history as it combines 3-D film, ride movement, and special effects for the very first time. The plot centers around Spider-Man battling the evil Sinister Syndicate, who has stolen the Statue of Liberty using an anti-gravity gun and threatens to destroy it unless the city surrenders to them.

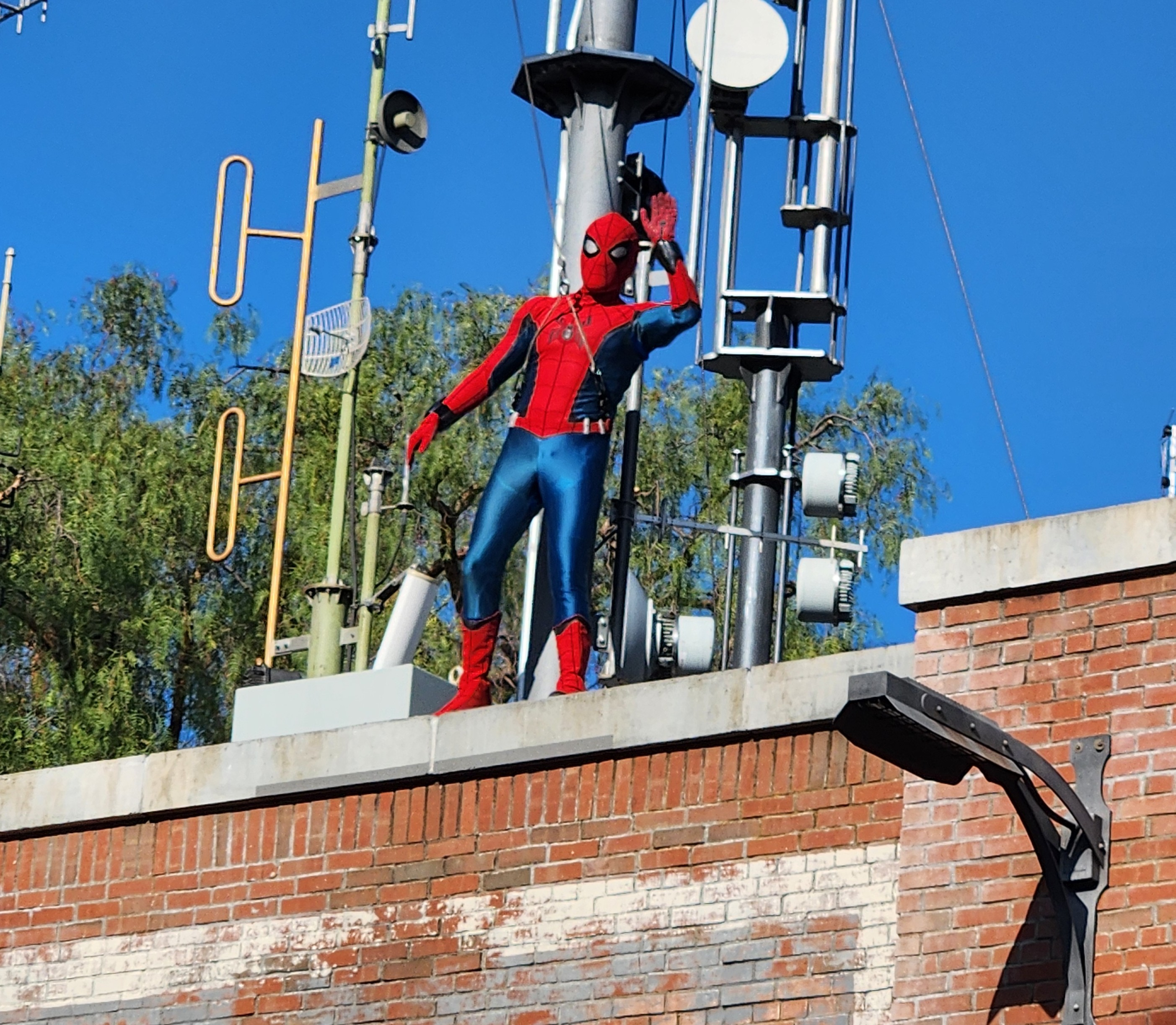
Spider-Man performer at Avengers Campus, Disney California Adventure

- Walt Disney Imagineering, in collaboration with Disney's Marvel Studios and Disney's Marvel Themed Entertainment divisions, developed the interactive ride Web Slingers: A Spider-Man Adventure. The ride opened in the Avengers Campus area of Disney California Adventure in 2021 and Disney Adventure World in Paris in 2022.

== Web series ==
- Spider-Man appears in several episodes of the stop-motion animated web series Marvel Superheroes: What the--?!.

== Unofficial media ==
=== Series ===
- Italian Spiderman, an Australian film parody of Italian action–adventure films of the 1960s and 1970s, first released on YouTube in 2007.

=== Fan films ===
- Spider-Man: an unauthorized short film directed by Donald F. Glut and released in 1969.
- 3 Dev Adam: a 1973 Turkish cult film, in which Spider-Man is featured as a villainous crime boss who later is defeated by Captain America and El Santo.
- Spider-Man Versus Kraven the Hunter: a 1974 short film written and directed by Bruce Cardozo, endorsed by Marvel Comics and authorized by Stan Lee.
- Viva Spider-Man: a 1989 student film. Its creator, Jim Krieg, would later write for Spider-Man: The Animated Series.
- The Green Goblin's Last Stand: a 1992 fan film, based on The Amazing Spider-Man comic book story "The Night Gwen Stacy Died", directed, written, and starring actor-stuntman Dan Poole. It was acclaimed for its high-risk stunts and guerrilla marketing.
- Spider-Man Lives: A Miles Morales Story is a 2015 Spider-Man fan film based on Miles Morales.
- Spider-Man: Lotus is a 2023 Spider-Man fan film also based on "The Night Gwen Stacy Died" comic as well as "The Kid Who Collects Spider-Man" comic and "Spider-Man: Blue".
- The Spider is a 2024 Spider-Man horror short fan-film starring Chandler Riggs in the title role, who also produced.
- What Would Spider-Man Do? is a 2024 fan film, based on The Amazing Spider-Man #700.5. It was directed/produced by Dusty Dale Barker and written by Zachery Gosse, who also stars as Peter Parker/Spider-Man.

== See also ==
- List of Spider-Man enemies in other media
- Green Goblin in other media
- List of actors who have played Spider-Man
