= Spider-Man book series =

Appearances of comic book character in books

Since the characters inception in the 1960s, Spider-Man has appeared in several forms of media, including standalone novels and book series.

== Duane trilogy ==
Written by Diane Duane.

=== Spider-Man: The Venom Factor (1994) ===
Homeless people are being killed and radioactive products are being stolen. It is reported in the news that the culprit looks like Venom who shows up and wants to find out who is impersonating him. There are numerous battles between the Hobgoblin, Venom, and Spider-Man. Hobgoblin threatens to blow Manhattan with a nuclear bomb unless he is paid a large amount of money. The Venom look-alike turns out to be eating the radioactive material and has tremendous strength; he even turns a train. Mary Jane has to turn down an acting part due to the Hobgoblins threats and because she does not want to leave New York. At the end the Venom-like creature is blown into small bipedal creatures which Spider-man captures.

=== Spider-Man: The Lizard Sanction (1995) ===
Spider-Man goes to Florida where Mary Jane is working at the time to stop the Lizard who is searching for a cure for his condition. Venom is also hunting the Lizard which interferes with Spider-Man's mission. Peter Parker is also supposed to be there with a reporter from the Daily Bugle to get a scoop on a space shuttle launch. A new substance named hydrogel, similar to smoke, comes into play in the story and Spider-Man and Venom form a loose alliance to find out what is happening. The Lizard regains some of his human qualities and saves Spider-Man's life at one point.

The book is one of the most popular Spider-Man novels and has been released in a number of different editions, including an audio book.

=== Spider-Man: The Octopus Agenda (1996) ===
Several nuclear explosions happened in the United States and Mary Jane's phone gets cloned and she receives a phone bill for over $4000. Spider-Man investigates these occurrences and finds out some information about the Russian mafia, namely that one group of mobsters are planning on blowing up several key cities in America and it turns out that Doctor Octopus is behind it all. Venom is also on the hunt after Doctor Octopus and he and Spider-Man team up again to defeat him.

== Spider-Man Super Thriller ==
A young adult novel series.

=== Spider-Man: Midnight Justice (1996) ===
Written by Martin Delrio. The story is set during the worst snowstorm in New York in over a hundred years. Spider-Man, the Fantastic Four, J. Jonah Jameson, Ben Urich and Peter Parker have all just received mayoral awards for helping make the city a better place. Eddie Brock sees the presentation on TV, and becomes upset by this so he sets out to ruin Spider-Man's reputation.

=== Spider-Man: Deadly Cure (1996) ===
Written by Bill McCay. A scientist at Empire State University has developed a formula which evolves people into perfect human beings. Kingpin funded the research, seeking a cure for his sick wife, Vanessa. The scientist, Dr. Aron Esterhazy, accepted the Kingpin's money, without thinking of the ethical and practical difficulties that such a funding source would eventually present. When Esterhazy decides not to hand over his research to Kingpin, he accidentally ends up being affected by his own chemical cocktail, and he turns into a super-strong being. While the Kingpin's goons and Hobgoblin all race to find Esterhazy and his formula, Spidey and Daredevil team up to try to save him.

=== Spider-Man: Global War (1997) ===
Written by Martin Delrio. The story revolves around Spider-Man and Captain America attempting to stop Doctor Octopus from launching several nuclear missiles.

It begins with a couple of villains in strange breathing-masks racing around town. Spider-Man manages to stop one, but the other three slip away. But before he can figure out what's going on, the Feds turn up and take over the case, leaving Spider-Man with nothing more than a vague recollection that he has seen those breathing-mask outfits some time before. Later he finds that there are army people all over Empire State University when he turns up, seems like there's been some sort of disturbance in a basement research lab investigating something related to compost, or such. He notices that Captain America is there. Spider-Man does a little snooping, and overhears the word "Caroline". He drops the name in front of Captain America, and he tells him what it's about. It seems that there's some EMP weapon which can basically destroy the electronic devices in most of the world.

=== Spider-Man: Lizard's Rage (1997) ===
Written by Neal Barrett Jr.

The Lizard's plans to capture the scientist Dr. Eileen McKay in order to force her to complete his latest formula to help him regrow his arm. That same evening Morbius also comes looking for Dr. McKay to help him rid himself of his pseudo-vampiric curse. Spider-Man happens to be swinging past, and gets caught up with saving Eileen. Seems that Eileen is actually Dr. Michael Morbius' pre-transformation junior lab assistant, nowadays an expert in her own right, hence Connors/Lizard knowing of her work.

Spider-Man fights Morbius, and Morbius later decides to leave to avoid the daylight. Dr. McKay does her own exposition, then Lizard turns up again. Spider-Man loses the fight with him, and Lizard gets to drag the chemist off to the sewers. Spidey gets knocked out and while unconscious is returned to his apartment. Mary Jane helps patch him up a bit. Later that night he heads out to search for the Lizard's trail, he again encounters Morbius, who has done some research, and believes he can figure what the Lizard will do next. Spider-Man and Morbius agree to join forces to stop the Lizard.

=== Spider-Man: Warrior's Revenge (1997) ===
Written by Neal Barrett Jr. The plot of the book is that the Super-Skrull is on the loose, looking to kill the sci-fi writer Berkley Whitmore. He attacks the writer just before an awards ceremony. Peter Parker is accompanying Joy Mercado as a photographer/writer duo to cover the story. It also turns out that Whitmore and Dr. Bruce Banner (aka Hulk) are old friends. Banner is attending the ceremony in secret, having been trapped in the form of Hulk while retaining his mind. His wife Betty Ross and Major Nefertiti Jones also plays a part in the story.

== Doom's Day trilogy ==
=== Spider-Man and the Incredible Hulk: Doom's Day Book One: Rampage (1996) ===
Written by Danny Fingeroth and Eric Fein. A scientist named Burton Hildebrandt who helped Doom try to create a Hulk several years ago and who survived his early failures has joined Hydra and uses their resources (including those of Advanced Idea Mechanics) to re-produce the experiment. Among the civilians tricked into partaking in the experiment is Flash Thompson. Hildebrandt also kidnaps Betty Banner (the Hulk's wife) in order to get Hulk to come and be the master for his Hulk photocopy plan. The Government agency S.A.F.E. enlist Spider-Man and Black Cat to help stop Hydra/Hildebrandt's plans. Hulk joins them as well.

=== Spider-Man and Iron Man: Doom's Day Book Two: Sabotage (1997) ===
Written by Pierce Askegren and Danny Fingeroth. Tony Stark has created an "Infinity Engine", a space craft which when launched into space and parked at Stark's recently restored "Ad Astra" space platform will beam down an unlimited supply of energy to the planet. Peter Parker, who was at the Stark party when the Engine was revealed, meets Tony Stark who offered him a job as a lab assistant to Dr. Haberman, who is the scientist who is programming the calibration software. Haberman has all the Infinity Engine software on his computer and Hydra come and shoot Haberman and take the software. Peter feels guilty because he couldn't be there to save Haberman. He and Iron Man go to rescue the space-ware from Hydra and Baron Strucker. A.I.M. appear attempt to get it too, and S.A.F.E. sends up a task force in a commandeered NASA shuttle.

=== Spider-Man and Fantastic Four: Doom's Day Book Three: Wreckage (1997) ===
Written by Eric Fein and Pierce Askegren. Doctor Doom's robots (masquerading as Hydra Dreadnaughts) rescue Doctor Octopus, and take both to Doom's New York lab, where Doom forces Doc Ock to assist him constructing the device that will conquer the world. Breaking into the Fantastic Four's building, Doom steals the energies of the Negative Zone. Doom then builds a giant Infinity Engine combo Gamma Syphon thingy on top of a tall building, and starts his countdown. Naturally, the Fantastic Four, Spider-Man, and SAFE combine to defeat him - assisted by Doctor Octopus, who rebels against being conscripted by Doom.

== X-Men and Spider-Man: Time's Arrow ==
=== X-Men and Spider-Man: Time's Arrow Book 1: The Past (1998) ===
Written by Tom DeFalco and Jason Henderson. Kang the Conqueror has come upon a brand-new plan: He wants to find a timeline with no heroes and where his wife Ravonna still lives, then wipe out every single other timeline, leaving only the one with Ravonna in it so Kang and Ravonna can live there together. At a museum exhibit of the Civil War era, Peter Parker stumbles over a picture of himself and Bishop. He also finds a deactivated spider-tracer. Pondering this puzzle, and promising Mary Jane that he'll be soon and heads over to the X-Men. Meanwhile, at the X-Mansion, the X-Men and Cable are having a discussion. Apparently, somebody has shot four "time arrows," which destroys timelines, into the past. After a bit of debate, Spider-Man and the X-Men decide to split up into four teams and go to the various points of history where the time arrows are.

=== X-Men and Spider-Man: Time's Arrow Book 2: The Present (1998) ===
Written by Tom DeFalco and Adam-Troy Castro. The "Time Displacement Core," damaged in a battle in the first book, is undergoing repairs. Meanwhile, Kang hss sent three more time arrows. In the parallel world, Spider-Man and Bishop help a team of misfits, led by Magneto and Aliya Dayspring, in a rebellion against that world's evil version of the X-Men. Spider-Man also meets his counterpart, an NBA star known as the Park. Meanwhile, in the main Marvel Universe, the other teams are sent to destroy the time arrows. Beast and Cable head to Antarctica to fight Volcana and Rhino. Wolverine and Gambit appear in an island in the Pacific, where they have to fight Hydro-Man and Electro. Iceman and Storm both rush off to the Devil's Crescent in Asia, where they battle the Wrecking Crew during a monsoon. Each of the three teams succeed in destroying the time arrows, but find out that they were doing what Kang wanted them to do.

=== X-Men and Spider-Man: Time's Arrow Book 3: The Future (1998) ===
Written by Tom DeFalco and Eluki Bes Shahar. Kang has found the timeline that he was searching for, and now he's planning to set off all the energy gathered from the time arrows to destroy everything except for his timeline. The heroes get sent to four separate possible futures to find the time-machine that send those time arrows into the past, so they can track the time arrows to their place of origin, and possibly end Kang's plan for once and for all.

Bishop, Iceman, and Wolverine all go to the year 3,000 and end up on an abandoned spaceship filled with slugs that have acid blood and where they also get to fight the Guardians of the Galaxy. Phoenix and Cyclops head to the 2035 timeline, where they meet their "granddaughter," Dream. Spider-Man, Cable, and Aliya leap to 2020, where they fight Iron Man 2020, and Spider-Man also gets to meet his daughter, May Parker. Beast, Gambit, and Storm travel to the 2099 version of the Savage Land, where they have to fight the X-Men of the 2099 era.

== Sinister Six trilogy ==
Written by Adam-Troy Castro.

=== Spider-Man: The Gathering of the Sinister Six (1999) ===
The Gentleman arrives in New York with his young ward, a mute woman known as Pity. The Gentleman has a plan to gain wealth and destroy the world simultaneously. To accomplish this, he wants the assistance of the Sinister Six. He begins by appearing at the Machiavelli Club, a refuge for high-toned criminals, and hiring the Chameleon to be his main recruiter. The Chameleon first recruits the Vulture and Mysterio and breaks Electro and Doctor Octopus out of prison. Peter finds some pictures of his parents in an old photo album, showing his mother pregnant and later holding a baby. The only trouble is that the photos date from two years before Peter's birth and the child in the photograph is definitely a girl.

=== Spider-Man: Revenge of the Sinister Six (2001) ===
Written by Adam-Troy Castro.

=== Spider-Man: Secret of the Sinister Six (2002) ===
Written by Adam-Troy Castro.

== See also ==
- Spider-Man in literature
- Bibliography of works on Spider-Man
- List of novels based on comics
