= Spider-Man =

Marvel Comics superhero

- Virgin cover of Web of Spider-Man #129.1 (October 2012), by Mike McKone and Morry Hollowell

Publication information
- Publisher: Marvel Comics
- First appearance: Amazing Fantasy #15 (August 1962)
- Created by: Stan Lee; Steve Ditko

In-story information
- Alter ego: Peter Benjamin Parker
- Place of origin: Queens, New York City, U.S.
- Team affiliations: Avengers; Daily Bugle; Fantastic Four; Future Foundation; Heroes for Hire; Mighty Avengers; New Avengers; Secret Defenders; Spider-Army / Web-Warriors
- Partnerships: Black Cat; Miles Morales; Silk
- Abilities: Superhuman strength, speed, agility, reflexes, stamina, and durability; Ability to cling to solid surfaces; Precognitive spider-sense; Genius-level intellect; Adept street fighter, skilled martial artist and hand-to-hand combatant; Proficient scientist and engineer; Utilizes wrist-mounted web-shooters

Spider-Man is a superhero in American comic books published by Marvel Comics. Created by writer-editor Stan Lee and artist Steve Ditko, he first appeared in the anthology comic book Amazing Fantasy #15 (August 1962) in the Silver Age of Comic Books. Widely regarded as one of the most popular and commercially successful superheroes, he has been featured in comic books, television shows, films, video games, novels, and plays.

Spider-Man's secret identity is Peter Benjamin Parker, who was raised by his Aunt May and Uncle Ben in Queens, New York City, after the death of his parents. Lee, Ditko, and later writers had the character deal with the struggles of adolescence and young adulthood. Readers identified with his self-doubt and loneliness. Unlike previous teen heroes, Spider-Man was not a sidekick nor did he have a mentor. He would be given many supporting characters. These include his Daily Bugle boss, J. Jonah Jameson; friends Harry Osborn and Flash Thompson; romantic interests Gwen Stacy, Mary Jane Watson, and the Black Cat; and enemies Doctor Octopus, the Green Goblin, and Venom. In his origin story, Peter gets his superhuman spider-powers and abilities after he was bitten by a radioactive spider. These powers include superhuman strength, speed, agility, reflexes, and durability; clinging to surfaces and ceilings; and detecting danger with his precognitive "spider-sense". He sews a spider-web-patterned spandex costume that fully covers his body and builds wrist-mounted "web-shooter" devices that shoot artificial spider-webs of his own design, which he uses for both fighting and "web swinging" across the city. Peter initially used his powers for personal gain, but after his Uncle Ben was killed by a burglar that he could have helped capture earlier but chose not to, he learned that "with great power comes great responsibility" and began to use his powers to fight crime as Spider-Man to atone for his inaction.

Marvel has featured Spider-Man in several comic book series, the first and longest-lasting of which is The Amazing Spider-Man. Since his introduction, the main-continuity version of Peter has gone from a high school student to attending college to currently being somewhere in his late 20s. Peter has been a member of numerous superhero teams, most notably the Avengers and Fantastic Four. Doctor Octopus also took on the identity for a story arc spanning 2012–2014 following the "Dying Wish" storyline, where Peter appears to die after Doctor Octopus orchestrates a body swap with him and becomes the Superior Spider-Man. Marvel has also published comic books featuring alternate versions of Spider-Man, including Spider-Man 2099, which features the adventures of Miguel O'Hara, the Spider-Man of the future; Ultimate Spider-Man, which features the adventures of a teenage Peter Parker in the alternate universe; and Ultimate Comics: Spider-Man, which depicts a teenager named Miles Morales who takes up the mantle of Spider-Man after Ultimate Peter Parker's apparent death. Miles later became a superhero in his own right and was brought into mainstream continuity during the Secret Wars event, where he sometimes works alongside the mainline version of Peter.

Spider-Man has appeared in many forms of media, including several animated TV series, a live-action television series, syndicated newspaper comic strips, and multiple series of films. In live-action films, Spider-Man has been portrayed by Tobey Maguire in Sam Raimi's Spider-Man trilogy (2002–2007; 2021), Andrew Garfield in The Amazing Spider-Man duology directed by Marc Webb (2012–2014; 2021), and Tom Holland in the Marvel Cinematic Universe (2016–present). The Peter Parker version of Spider-Man was also voiced by Jake Johnson and Chris Pine in the animated film Spider-Man: Into the Spider-Verse (2018), with the former reprising his role in the sequel, Spider-Man: Across the Spider-Verse (2023).

== Publication history ==
=== Creation and development ===
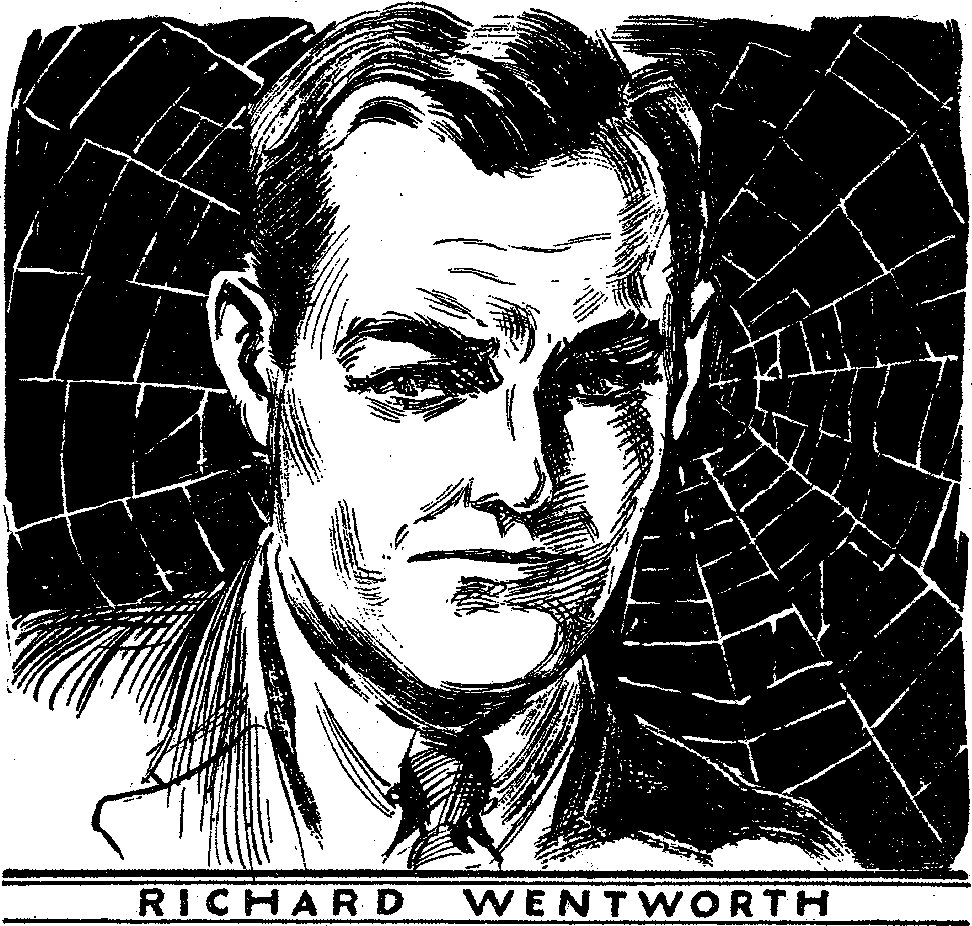
Richard Wentworth, a.k.a. the Spider in the pulp magazine The Spider. Stan Lee stated the Spider influenced the creation of Spider-Man.

In 1962, with the success of the Fantastic Four, Marvel Comics editor and head writer Stan Lee was looking for a new superhero idea. He said the teenage demand for comic books and a character with whom they could identify led to the creation of Spider-Man. As with Fantastic Four, Lee saw Spider-Man as an opportunity to "get out of his system" what he felt was missing in comic books.

There are many conflicting stories about the inspiration and precise authorship of the various aspects of Spider-Man's appearance and character. In his autobiography, Lee cites the non-superhuman pulp magazine crime fighter the Spider as a great influence. Besides the name, the Spider was wanted by both the law and the criminal underworld (a defining theme of Spider-Man's early years) and had through years of ceaseless struggle developed a "sixth sense", which warns him of danger, the inspiration for Spider-Man's "spider-sense". In a multitude of print and video interviews, Lee also says he was inspired by seeing a spider climb up a wall—adding in his autobiography that he has told that story so often he has become unsure of whether or not this is true.

Although at the time teenage superheroes were usually given names ending with "boy", Lee says he chose "Spider-Man" because he wanted the character to age as the series progressed, and felt the name "Spider-Boy" would have made the character sound inferior to other superheroes. Comics scholar Ben Saunders points out that this emphasis on adolescence was an important innovation for superhero comics.

Lee required Marvel publisher Martin Goodman's approval for the character. In a 1986 interview, Lee gives his arguments against Goodman's objections. (Note: Detroit Free Press interview with Stan Lee, quoted in Theakston 2002, p. 12 (unnumbered). "He gave me 1,000 reasons why Spider-Man would never work. Nobody likes spiders; it sounds too much like Superman, and how could a teenager be a superhero? Then I told him I wanted the character to be a very human guy, someone who makes mistakes, who worries, who gets acne, has trouble with his girlfriend, and things like that. [Goodman replied,] 'He's a hero! He's not an average man!' I said, 'No, we make him an average man who happens to have superpowers, that's what will make him good.' He told me I was crazy".) Goodman eventually agreed to a Spider-Man tryout in what Lee, in numerous interviews, recalled as what would be the final issue of the science-fiction and supernatural anthology series Amazing Adult Fantasy, which was renamed Amazing Fantasy for issue #15 (cover-dated August 1962, on sale June 5, 1962). In particular, Lee states that the decision that Amazing Fantasy would be canceled after issue #15 was the only reason Goodman allowed him to present Spider-Man. While this was the final issue, its editorial page anticipated the continuing appearances of Spider-Man in future issues.

Lee received Goodman's approval for the name Spider-Man and the "ordinary teen" concept and approached artist Jack Kirby. As comics historian Greg Theakston recounts, Kirby told Lee about an unpublished character on which he had collaborated with Joe Simon in the 1950s, in which an orphaned boy living with an old couple finds a magic ring that granted him superhuman powers. Lee and Kirby "immediately sat down for a story conference", Theakston writes, and Lee afterward directed Kirby to flesh out the character and draw some pages. Steve Ditko would be the inker. (Note: Ditko 2000: "'Stan said a new Marvel hero would be introduced in #15 [of what became titled Amazing Fantasy]. He would be called Spider-Man. Jack would do the penciling, and I was to ink the character.' At this point still, Stan said Spider-Man would be a teenager with a magic ring that could transform him into an adult hero—Spider-Man. I said it sounded like the Fly, which Joe Simon had done for Archie Comics. Stan called Jack about it, but I don't know what was discussed. I never talked to Jack about Spider-Man... Later, at some point, I was given the job of drawing Spider-Man'".) When Kirby showed Lee the first six pages, Lee recalled, "I hated the way he was doing it! Not that he did it badly—it just wasn't the character I wanted; it was too heroic". Lee turned to Ditko, who developed an art style Lee found satisfactory. Ditko recalled:

One of the first things I did was to work up a costume. A vital, visual part of the character. I had to know how he looked ... before I did any breakdowns. For example: A clinging power so he wouldn't have hard shoes or boots, a hidden wrist-shooter versus a web gun and holster, etc. ... I wasn't sure Stan would like the idea of covering the character's face but I did it because it hid an obviously boyish face. It would also add mystery to the character....

Although the interior artwork was by Ditko alone, Lee rejected Ditko's cover art and commissioned Kirby to pencil a cover that Ditko inked. As Lee explained in 2010, "I think I had Jack sketch out a cover for it because I always had a lot of confidence in Jack's covers."

Amazing Fantasy #15 (Aug. 1962) first introduced the character. It was a gateway to commercial success for the superhero and inspired the launch of The Amazing Spider-Man comic book. – Cover art by penciller Jack Kirby and inker Steve Ditko

Kirby disputed Lee's version of the story and claimed Lee had minimal involvement in the character's creation. According to Kirby, the idea for Spider-Man had originated with Kirby and Joe Simon, who in the 1950s had developed a character called the Silver Spider for the Crestwood Publications comic Black Magic, but the character was left unused. (Note: Jack Kirby in "Shop Talk: Jack Kirby", Will Eisner's Spirit Magazine #39 (February 1982): "Spider-Man was discussed between Joe Simon and myself. It was the last thing Joe, and I had discussed. We had a strip called 'The Silver Spider.' The Silver Spider was going into a magazine called Black Magic. Black Magic folded with Crestwood (Simon & Kirby's 1950s comics company) and we were left with the script. I believe I said this could become a thing called Spider-Man, see, a superhero character. I had a lot of faith in the superhero character that they could be brought back... and I said Spider-Man would be a fine character to start with. But Joe had already moved on. So the idea was already there when I talked to Stan".) Simon, in his 1990 autobiography, disputed Kirby's account, asserting that Black Magic was not a factor and that Simon devised the name "Spider-Man" (later changed to "The Silver Spider"), while Kirby outlined the character's story and powers. Simon later elaborated that his and Kirby's character conception became the basis for Simon's Archie Comics superhero, the Fly. Artist Steve Ditko stated that Lee liked the name Hawkman from DC Comics, and that "Spider-Man" was an outgrowth of that interest.

Simon concurred that Kirby had shown the original Spider-Man version to Lee, who liked the idea and assigned Kirby to draw sample pages of the new character, but disliked the results—in Simon's description, "Captain America with cobwebs". (Note: Simon, Joe, with Jim Simon. The Comic Book Makers (Crestwood/II, 1990) ISBN 1-887591-35-4. "There were a few holes in Jack's never-dependable memory. For instance, there was no Black Magic involved at all. ... Jack brought in the Spider-Man logo that I had loaned to him before we changed the name to The Silver Spider. Kirby laid out the story to Lee about the kid who finds a ring in a spiderweb, gets his powers from the ring, and goes forth to fight crime armed with The Silver Spider's old web-spinning pistol. Stan Lee said, 'Perfect, just what I want.' After obtaining permission from publisher Martin Goodman, Lee told Kirby to pencil-up an origin story. Kirby... using parts of an old rejected superhero named Night Fighter... revamped the old Silver Spider script, including revisions suggested by Lee. But when Kirby showed Lee the sample pages, it was Lee's turn to gripe. He had been expecting a skinny young kid who is transformed into a skinny young kid with spider powers. Kirby had him turn into... Captain America with cobwebs. He turned Spider-Man over to Steve Ditko, who... ignored Kirby's pages, tossed the character's magic ring, web pistol and goggles... and completely redesigned Spider-Man's costume and equipment. In this life, he became high-school student Peter Parker, who gets his spider powers after being bitten by a radioactive spider. ... Lastly, the Spider-Man logo was redone and a dashing hyphen added".) Writer Mark Evanier notes that Lee's reasoning that Kirby's character was too heroic seems unlikely—Kirby still drew the covers for Amazing Fantasy #15 and the first issue of The Amazing Spider-Man. Evanier also disputes Kirby's given reason that he was "too busy" to draw Spider-Man in addition to his other duties, since Kirby was, said Evanier, "always busy". Neither Lee's nor Kirby's explanation explains why key story elements like the magic ring were dropped; Evanier states that the most plausible explanation for the sudden change was that Goodman, or one of his assistants, decided that Spider-Man, as drawn and envisioned by Kirby, was too similar to the Fly.

Author and Ditko scholar Blake Bell writes that it was Ditko who noted the similarities to the Fly. Ditko recalled that "Stan called Jack about the Fly", adding that "[d]ays later, Stan told me I would be penciling the story panel breakdowns from Stan's synopsis." It was at this point that the entire concept of the strip went through a major overhaul. "Out went the magic ring, adult Spider-Man and whatever legend ideas that Spider-Man story would have contained." Lee gave Ditko the premise of a teenager bitten by a spider and developing powers, where Ditko would expand upon to the point he became what Bell describes as "the first work for hire artist of his generation to create and control the narrative arc of his series". On the issue of the initial creation, Ditko stated, "I still don't know whose idea was Spider-Man". Ditko did, however, view the published version of Spider-Man as a separate creation to the one he saw in the five pencilled pages that Kirby had completed. To support this, Ditko used the analogy of the Kirby/Marvel Thor, which was based on a name or idea of a character in Norse mythology: "If Marvel's Thor is a valid created work by Jack, his creation, then why isn't Spider-Man by Stan and me valid created work, our creation?"

At the time of Spider-Man's creation, Ditko shared a Manhattan studio with noted fetish artist Eric Stanton, an art-school classmate who, in a 1988 interview with Theakston, recalled that although his contribution to Spider-Man was "almost nil", he and Ditko had "worked on storyboards together and I added a few ideas. But the whole thing was created by Steve on his own ... I think I added the business about the webs coming out of his hands."

Kirby noted in a 1971 interview that it was Ditko who "got Spider-Man to roll, and the thing caught on because of what he did". Lee, while claiming credit for the initial idea, had acknowledged Ditko's role, stating, "If Steve wants to be called co-creator, I think he deserves [it]". In an interview with Roy Thomas, Lee further commented that Ditko's costume design was key to the character's success; since the costume completely covers Spider-Man's body, people of all races could visualize themselves inside the costume and thus easily identify with the character.

As depicted in Amazing Fantasy #15 (Aug. 1962), Peter Parker is bitten by a radioactive spider (erroneously classified as an insect in the panel) at a science exhibit and "acquires the agility and proportionate strength of an arachnid". When "[h]e blithely ignores the chance to stop a fleeing thief, [and] his indifference ironically catches up with him when the same criminal later robs and kills his Uncle Ben." Spider-Man tracks and subdues the killer and learns, in the story's next-to-last caption, "With great power there must also come—great responsibility!" Ben Saunders points out that this conclusion makes problematic the usual conceptions of heroism in the genre; Ben's death does not fully validate Peter Parker's new mission, and the protagonist is continually portrayed as a conflicted, imperfect person, in uncertain circumstances.

=== 1960s ===
A few months after Spider-Man's introduction, publisher Goodman reviewed the sales figures for that issue and was shocked to find it was one of the nascent Marvel's highest-selling comics. A solo ongoing series followed, beginning with The Amazing Spider-Man #1 (cover-dated March 1963). The title eventually became Marvel's top-selling series with the character swiftly becoming a cultural icon; a 1965 Esquire poll of college campuses found that college students ranked Spider-Man and fellow Marvel hero the Hulk alongside Bob Dylan and Che Guevara as their favorite revolutionary icons. One interviewee selected Spider-Man because he was "beset by woes, money problems, and the question of existence. In short, he is one of us." Ditko introduced Peter Parker's boss, J. Jonah Jameson, newspaper publisher of the Daily Bugle, who despises Spider-Man and slanders him despite his heroism. Parker experiences frequent high-school drama involving his love interest, Betty Brant, and a classroom bully, Flash Thompson.

In the first issue of The Amazing Spider-Man (March 1963), despite his superpowers, Peter struggles to help his widowed Aunt May pay the rent, is taunted by Flash, and continues fighting crime and saving the city as Spider-Man. Peter gets hired as a freelance photographer Jameson to take pictures of Spider-Man, with Jameson unaware that Spider-Man is Peter Parker. Ben Saunders identifies nineteen different supervillains who appear in the early Spider-Man stories of Lee and Ditko, sixteen of which become recurring figures in the Marvel Universe. These enemies include Green Goblin, Doctor Octopus, Sandman, Chameleon, Lizard, Vulture, Kraven the Hunter, Electro, and Mysterio. Peter finds juggling his personal and superhero life difficult. Ditko's quirky art provided a stark contrast to the more cleanly dynamic stylings of Marvel's most prominent artist, Jack Kirby.

Following Ditko's departure after issue #38 (July 1966), John Romita Sr. replaced him as penciller and would draw the series for the next several years. In 1968, Romita also drew the character's extra-length stories in the comics magazine The Spectacular Spider-Man, a proto-graphic novel designed to appeal to older readers. It lasted for two issues and represented the first Spider-Man spin-off publication, aside from the original series' summer Annuals that began in 1964. Romita's illustrations of the character were substantially more glamorous and influenced by romance comics of the time; Parker's social status markedly improved. Romita introduced a new prominent enemy for Spider-Man, the gangster Wilson Fisk, also known as Kingpin. In this period, Peter graduates from high school, and enrolls at Empire State University (a fictional institution evoking the real-life Columbia University and New York University), where he meets roommate and best friend Harry Osborn and girlfriend Gwen Stacy. As Peter deals with Harry's drug problems, and Harry's father, Norman Osborn, is revealed to be the Green Goblin, Peter attempts to give up his costumed identity for a while. Gwen Stacy's father, New York City Police detective Captain George Stacy, is accidentally killed during a battle between Spider-Man and Doctor Octopus (issue #90, November 1970).

Romita also created a new love interest for Peter Parker, Mary Jane Watson. Romita's storylines emphasize a long triangle between Parker, Watson, and Gwen Stacy. This period included one of the first Black supporting characters in superhero comic books, Robbie Robertson, a reporter at the Daily Bugle. By 1968, the series began to address political controversies and student activism.

=== 1970s ===
An early 1970s Spider-Man story ultimately led to the revision of the Comics Code Authority. Previously, the Code forbade the depiction of the use of illegal drugs, even negatively. However, in 1970, the Nixon administration's Department of Health, Education, and Welfare asked Stan Lee to publish an anti-drug message in one of Marvel's top-selling titles. Lee chose the top-selling The Amazing Spider-Man; issues #96–98 (May–July 1971) feature a story arc depicting the negative effects of drug use. In the story, Peter Parker's friend Harry Osborn becomes addicted to pills. When Spider-Man fights the Green Goblin (Norman Osborn, Harry's father), Spider-Man defeats him by revealing Harry's drug addiction. While the story had a clear anti-drug message, the Comics Code Authority refused to issue its seal of approval. Marvel nevertheless published the three issues without the Comics Code Authority's approval or seal. The issues sold so well that the industry's self-censorship was undercut, and the Code was subsequently revised.

By 1972, with Spider-Man as its flagship character, Marvel had begun to outsell its primary competitor, DC. In that year, a second monthly ongoing series starring Spider-Man began: Marvel Team-Up, in which Spider-Man was paired with other superheroes and supervillains. From that point on, there have generally been at least two ongoing Spider-Man series at any time. Gerry Conway became the primary writer of the series from 1972 to 1975, and Ross Andru was the penciller from October 1973 to July 1978. In 1973, Gwen Stacy was tragically killed during her rescue from the Green Goblin, a turning point for Spider-Man. In issue #121 (June 1973), the Green Goblin throws Gwen Stacy from a tower of either the Brooklyn Bridge (as depicted in the art) or the George Washington Bridge (as given in the text). She dies during Spider-Man's rescue attempt, and Spider-Man swears revenge against his nemesis; a note on the letters page of issue #125 states: "It saddens us to say that the whiplash effect she underwent when Spidey's webbing stopped her so suddenly was, in fact, what killed her." The following issue, Spider-Man vengefully attacks and overpowers the Green Goblin, who kills himself accidentally in the ensuing battle with Spider-Man.

In 1974, the Punisher, a murderous vigilante who later became particularly popular, first appeared in the series. Len Wein became the new writer in December 1975. He was replaced in June 1978, initially by Bill Mantlo and later by Marv Wolfman. Sal Buscema, Jim Starlin, Keith Pollard, and John Byrne were all featured artists in the late 1970s.

In December 1976, a second solo series, Peter Parker, the Spectacular Spider-Man, began running parallel to the main series.

Working through his grief for Gwen Stacy, Peter eventually develops tentative feelings toward Mary Jane, and the two "become confidants rather than lovers". A romantic relationship eventually develops, with Parker proposing to her in issue #182 (July 1978), and being turned down an issue later. Felicia Hardy, also known as the Black Cat, first appeared in the series in 1979; she becomes a new femme fatale love interest for Peter.

=== 1980s ===
In the early 1980s, Roger Stern and John Romita Jr. (the son of the primary artist in the late 1960s) became the primary creative team of The Amazing Spider-Man.

The Amazing Spider-Man #252 (May 1984): The black costume was later revealed as an alien symbiote and was used in the creation of the villain Venom. – Cover art by Ron Frenz and Klaus Janson

A third series featuring Spider-Man, Web of Spider-Man, launched in 1985 to replace Marvel Team-Up. In the mid-1980s, Spider-Man was also a significant character in the Secret Wars miniseries, which led to his adoption of a new black costume. At the end of the decade, this costume was revealed to be a symbiote which became a prominent new enemy, Venom. From 1984 to 1988, Spider-Man wore a black costume with a white spider design on his chest. The new costume originated in the Secret Wars miniseries on an alien planet where Spider-Man participates in a battle between Earth's major superheroes and supervillains. He continues wearing the costume when he returns, starting in The Amazing Spider-Man #252. The creators then revealed the costume was an alien symbiote, which Spider-Man rejects after a difficult struggle, though the symbiote returns several times as Venom for revenge.

In 1987, Peter Parker and Mary Jane Watson were married; the creative team in this period was Jim Shooter as plot writer and Paul Ryan as penciller. Peter proposes to Mary Jane in The Amazing Spider-Man #290 (July 1987), and she accepts two issues later, with the wedding taking place in The Amazing Spider-Man Annual #21 (1987)—promoted with a real-life mock wedding using actors at Shea Stadium, with Stan Lee officiating, on June 5, 1987. David Michelinie, who scripted based on a plot by editor-in-chief Jim Shooter, said in 2007, "I didn't think they actually should [have gotten] married. ... I had actually planned another version, one that wasn't used."

October 1985 to 1986 in The Spectacular Spider-Man featured a storyline inspired by film noir, "The Death of Jean DeWolff". October to November 1987 were devoted to an equally dark story that crossed over among the three Spider-Man titles, "Kraven's Last Hunt". Todd McFarlane became the new artist of The Amazing Spider-Man in March 1988; his rendition of Spider-Man distinguished itself by "'impossible' anatomy, huge eyes, poses that were more spiderlike than human, skewed frames, and brand-new spaghetti webbing."

=== 1990s ===
The launch of a fourth monthly title in 1990, the "adjectiveless" Spider-Man (with the storyline "Torment"), written and drawn by popular artist Todd McFarlane, debuted with several different covers, all with the same interior content. All four versions combined sold over three million copies, an industry record at the time. Several miniseries, one-shot issues, and loosely related comics were also published in this decade, and Spider-Man made frequent cameos and guest appearances in other comic book series. In 1996, The Sensational Spider-Man was created to replace Web of Spider-Man.

In the mid-1990s, there was a very long storyline in which a clone of Spider-Man first created in an earlier storyline of the 1970s returned, and it was unclear which of the two versions of Peter Parker was the original. This lasted for three years. In the controversial 1990s storyline the "Clone Saga", a clone of Parker, created in a storyline of the 1970s, re-appears after living incognito as Ben Reilly and allies with Parker. To the surprise of both, new tests indicate Ben is the original and Peter is the clone. Complicating matters, Mary Jane announces in The Spectacular Spider-Man #220 (Jan. 1995) that she is pregnant with Peter's baby. Later, however, a resurrected Norman Osborn has Mary Jane poisoned, causing premature labor and the death of her and Peter's unborn daughter. It is later revealed that The Green Goblin switched the results of the clone test in an attempt to destroy Peter's life by making him believe himself to be the clone. Ben is killed while saving Peter, in Peter Parker: Spider-Man #75 (Dec. 1996), and his body immediately crumbles into dust, confirming Ben was the clone.

In 1998, writer-artist John Byrne revamped the origin of Spider-Man in the 13-issue limited series Spider-Man: Chapter One (Dec. 1998–Oct. 1999), similar to Byrne's adding details and some revisions to Superman's origin in DC Comics' The Man of Steel. During that time, the original The Amazing Spider-Man ended, and The Amazing Spider-Man started with volume 2, #1 (Jan. 1999).

In issue #97 (Nov. 1998) of the second series titled Peter Parker: Spider-Man, Parker learns Norman Osborn kidnapped Aunt May and her apparent death in The Amazing Spider-Man #400 (April 1995) had been a hoax. Shortly afterward, Mary Jane appears to be killed in an airplane explosion. She is subsequently revealed to be alive, but she and Peter are then completely separated.

=== 2000s ===
In October 2000, an alternative interpretation and updated re-imagining of the character appeared in Ultimate Spider-Man, written by Brian Michael Bendis.

Beginning in June 2001, J. Michael Straczynski, who had created the science fiction TV show Babylon Five, became the primary writer of The Amazing Spider-Man. In this period, Peter, now employed as a teacher at his old high school, meets the enigmatic Ezekiel Sims, who possesses similar spider powers and suggests that Peter, having gained such abilities, might not have been a fluke—that Parker has a connection to a totemic spider spirit. In vol. 2, #37 (#478, Jan. 2002), Aunt May discovers her nephew is Spider-Man.

Beginning in 2005, Spider-Man joined the Avengers and appeared in the New Avengers series written by Bendis. After a deranged, superpowered former high-school classmate destroys their respective homes, Peter, Mary Jane, and May move into Stark Tower, and Peter begins working as Tony Stark's assistant while freelancing for The Daily Bugle and continuing his teacher career. In the 12-part 2005 story arc "The Other", Peter undergoes a transformation that evolves his powers. In the comic Civil War #2 (June 2006), part of the company-wide crossover arc of that title, the U.S. government's Superhuman Registration Act leads Spider-Man to reveal his true identity publicly. A growing unease about the Registration Act prompts him to escape with May and Mary Jane and joins the anti-registration underground.

In 2007, the "One More Day" storyline un-did Peter Parker's marriage to Mary Jane Watson; the demon Mephisto magically erased the event from the memory of everyone in the world. In issue #537 (Dec. 2006), Aunt May is critically wounded from Wilson Fisk's sniper, and enters into a coma. Peter, desperate to save her, exhausts all possibilities and makes a pact with the demon-lord Mephisto, who saves May's life in exchange for Peter and Mary Jane agreeing to have their marriage and all memory of it disappear. In this changed reality, Spider-Man's identity is secret once again, and in #545 (Jan. 2008), Mary Jane returns and is cold toward him. The controversial storyline "One More Day" rolled back much of the fictional continuity at the behest of editor-in-chief Joe Quesada, who said, "Peter being single is an intrinsic part of the very foundation of the world of Spider-Man". It caused unusual public friction between Quesada and writer Straczynski, who "told Joe that I was going to take my name off the last two issues of the [story] arc", but was talked out of doing so. At issue with Straczynski's climax to the arc, Quesada said, was

...that we didn't receive the story and methodology to the resolution that we were all expecting. What made that very problematic is that we had four writers and artists well underway on [the sequel arc] "Brand New Day" that were expecting and needed "One More Day" to end in the way that we had all agreed it would. ... The fact that we had to ask for the story to move back to its original intent understandably made Joe upset and caused some major delays and page increases in the series. Also, the science that Joe was going to apply to the retcon of the marriage would have made over 30 years of Spider-Man books worthless, because they never would have had happened. ...[I]t would have reset way too many things outside of the Spider-Man titles. We just couldn't go there....

In this new continuity, designed to have very limited repercussions throughout the remainder of the Marvel Universe, Parker begins working for the alternative press paper The Front Line. J. Jonah Jameson becomes the Mayor of New York City in issue #591 (June 2008).

When the main series The Amazing Spider-Man reached issue #545 (Dec. 2007), Marvel dropped its spin-off ongoing series and instead began publishing The Amazing Spider-Man three times monthly, beginning with #546–548 (all January 2008). The scheduling of The Amazing Spider-Man lasted until November 2010, when the comic book expanded from 22 pages to 30 pages for each issue. Later on, The Amazing Spider-Man was published twice a month, beginning with #648–649 (both November 2010).

=== 2010s ===
In Ultimate Spider-Man, a storyline that began in 2011 narrated the death of the alternative version of Peter Parker, who was replaced by a younger character with similar powers, Miles Morales.

In 2012, Marvel launched Avenging Spider-Man as the first spin-off ongoing series in addition to The Amazing Spider-Man, since the previous ones were canceled at the end of 2007. Dan Slott became the primary writer of The Amazing Spider-Man in January 2011. The Amazing series temporarily ended with issue #700 in December 2012 and was replaced by The Superior Spider-Man, which had Doctor Octopus serve as the new Spider-Man by taking over Peter Parker's body. One of Doctor Octopus' Octobots swaps his and Spider-Man's personality, causing Peter to become trapped in the Doctor's dying body, while he in turn claimed Peter's life for himself. Though Peter failed to reverse the change, he manages to establish a weak link with the Doctor's mind, forcing him to relive all of his memories; Otto understands Peter's ideals of power and responsibility and swears to carry on with Peter's life with dignity as a "Superior" Spider-Man. Superior was an enormous commercial success for Marvel, and ran for 31 issues before the real Peter Parker returned in a newly relaunched The Amazing Spider-Man #1 in April 2014.

Later, realizing that he failed in his role as the "Superior" Spider-Man, Otto willingly allows Peter to reclaim his body in order to defeat Osborn and save a woman Otto loves. In the aftermath of these events, Peter began to amend the relationships damaged by Otto's arrogance and negligence, both as Peter Parker and Spider-Man. He additionally took up the reins of Parker Industries, a small company founded by Otto.

Peter soon learns a second person had been bitten by the radioactive spider, Cindy Moon. Spider-Man tracks her down and frees her from a bunker owned by the late Ezekiel Simms. Cindy goes on to adopt her own heroine identity as Silk. The Spider-Verse storyline began in November 2014, introducing new variants of Spider-Man, such as Spider-Man Noir and Spider-Gwen. Spider-Man encounters a contingent of spider-people from all over the Multiverse that banded together to fight the Inheritors, a group of psychic vampires who had begun to hunt down the spider-totems of other realities. During a mission to gather more recruits in 2099, the Spider-Army stumbled upon another party of spider-people led by a time displaced Superior Spider-Man (Who later lost memory of the event). Together, they neutralize the Inheritors.

Following the 2015 Secret Wars crossover event, a number of Spider-Man-related titles were begun or relaunched. Among them, The Amazing Spider-Man was relaunched and primarily focuses on Peter Parker continuing to run Parker Industries and becoming a successful global businessman.

== Fictional character biography ==
Born in Forest Hills, Queens, New York City, Peter Benjamin Parker's parents died in a plane crash when he was a child. He is raised by his Uncle Ben and Aunt May. At Midtown High School, Peter is an excellent student and scientific prodigy, but he is not popular with his peers. He is bitten by a radioactive spider at a science exhibit and subsequently develops superhuman strength, speed, and agility, as well as the ability to adhere to walls and ceilings. Through his knack for science, he develops a gadget that lets him fire adhesive webbing of his own design through small, wrist-mounted barrels. Initially seeking to capitalize on his new abilities, Parker dons a costume and, as "Spider-Man", becomes a novelty television star. However, he refuses to prevent the escape of a thief, who subsequently murders his beloved Uncle Ben. He tracks down the killer, and, overcome by guilt, devotes himself to applying his powers in the service of justice.

Peter struggles to help his widowed Aunt May pay the rent, has social problems as a student, and continues fighting crime and saving the city as Spider-Man. His heroic deeds engender the editorial wrath of newspaper publisher of the Daily Bugle, J. Jonah Jameson, who holds a grudge against Spider-Man. Peter gets hired as a freelance photographer by Jameson to take pictures of Spider-Man, with him being unaware that Spider-Man is Peter Parker. Spider-Man fights various enemies, including archenemy and nemesis Green Goblin and then Doctor Octopus, Sandman, Chameleon, Lizard, Vulture, Kraven the Hunter, Electro, and Mysterio, defeating them one by one. Peter finds juggling his personal and superhero life difficult.

Peter graduates from high school and enrolls at Empire State University, where he meets roommate and best friend Harry Osborn and girlfriend Gwen Stacy, and Aunt May introduces him to Mary Jane Watson. As Peter deals with Harry's drug problems, and Harry's father, Norman Osborn, is revealed to be the Green Goblin, Peter attempts to give up his costumed identity for a while. Gwen Stacy's father, New York City Police detective Captain George Stacy, is accidentally killed during a battle between Spider-Man and Doctor Octopus. Later, the Green Goblin throws Gwen Stacy from a tower of a major bridge. She dies during Spider-Man's rescue attempt, and Spider-Man swears revenge against his nemesis the Green Goblin, who kills himself accidentally in an ensuing battle with Spider-Man.

Working through his grief, Peter eventually develops tentative feelings toward Mary Jane, and the two become close. A romantic relationship eventually develops, with Parker eventually proposing and being turned down. Peter graduates from college, and becomes involved with the flirtatious costumed thief Felicia Hardy, a.k.a. the Black Cat.

Spider-Man visits an alien planet, where he participates in a battle between Earth's major superheroes and supervillains. On this planet, he discovers a mysterious black alien suit that initially obeys his mental control. The costume eventually reveals itself as an alien symbiote, which Spider-Man rejects after a difficult struggle, though the symbiote returns several times as Venom for revenge. Peter again proposes to Mary Jane and this time she accepts.

A clone of Parker created in his college years by insane scientist Miles Warren, a.k.a. the Jackal, returns to New York City upon hearing of Aunt May's health worsening. The clone had lived incognito as Ben Reilly, but now assumes the superhero guise the Scarlet Spider and allies with Parker. To the surprise of both, new tests indicate Ben is the original and Peter is the clone. Complicating matters, Mary Jane announces that she is pregnant with Peter's baby. Later, however, a resurrected Norman Osborn has Mary Jane poisoned, causing premature labor and the death of her and Peter's unborn daughter. It is later revealed that The Green Goblin switched the results of the clone test in an attempt to destroy Peter's life by making him believe himself to be the clone. Ben is killed while saving Peter, and it is confirmed that Ben was the clone.

Aunt May appears to die, but this is revealed as a hoax. Shortly afterward, Mary Jane also has an apparent death that is later discovered to be a mistaken impression. Mary Jane and Peter become estranged.

Peter becomes a teacher at his old high school. He meets the enigmatic Ezekiel Sims, and comes to believe that he has a connection to a totemic spider spirit. Parker comes to believe that his late girlfriend Gwen Stacy had had two children with Norman Osborn, although this is later revealed as a hoax.

He joins the superhero team the New Avengers. After a deranged, superpowered former high-school classmate destroys their respective homes, Peter, Mary Jane, and May move into Stark Tower, and Peter begins working as Tony Stark's assistant while freelancing for The Daily Bugle and continuing his teaching career. Peter undergoes a transformation that evolves his powers. The U.S. government's Superhuman Registration Act leads Spider-Man to reveal his true identity publicly. A growing unease about the Registration Act prompts him to escape with May and Mary Jane and joins the anti-registration underground.

Aunt May is critically wounded by Wilson Fisk's sniper, and enters into a coma. Peter, desperate to save her, exhausts all possibilities and makes a pact with the demon-lord Mephisto, who saves May's life in exchange for Peter and Mary Jane agreeing to have their marriage and all memory of it disappear. In this changed reality, Spider-Man's identity is secret once again. Parker returns to work at the Daily Bugle, which has been renamed The DB under a new publisher. He soon switches to the alternative press paper The Front Line. J. Jonah Jameson becomes the Mayor of New York City.

A conflict between Spider-Man and Doctor Octopus over Osborn's son ends when it is revealed the child's father is Harry, who leaves town to raise him. One of Doctor Octopus's Octobots swaps his and Spider-Man's personality, causing Peter to become trapped in the Doctor's dying body, while he in turn claimed Peter's life for himself. Though Peter failed to reverse the change, he manages to establish a weak link with the Doctor's mind, forcing him to relive all of his memories. Otto understands Peter's ideals of power and responsibility and swears to carry on with Peter's life with dignity as a "Superior" Spider-Man. A portion of Peter survived in his original body in the form of a subconsciousness. Later, realizing that he failed in his role as the "Superior" Spider-Man, Otto willingly allows Peter to reclaim his body in order to defeat Osborn and save Anna Maria Marconi, Otto's love. In the aftermath of these events, Peter began to amend the relationships damaged by Otto's arrogance and negligence, both as Peter Parker and Spider-Man. He additionally took up the reins of Parker Industries, a small company founded by Otto after leaving Horizon Labs.

Peter soon learns a second person had been bitten by the radioactive spider, Cindy Moon. Spider-Man tracks her down and frees her from a bunker owned by the late Ezekiel Simms. Not long after rescuing Cindy, who went on to adopt her own heroine identity as Silk, Spider-Man encounters a contingent of spider-people from all over the Multiverse that banded together to fight the Inheritors, a group of psychic vampires who had begun to hunt down the spider-totems of other realities. During a mission to gather more recruits in 2099, the Spider-Army stumbled upon another party of spider-people led by a time displaced Superior Spider-Man (Who later lost memory of the event). Together, they neutralize the Inheritors.

Peter then stops a nefarious plan put forward by the Jackal. Peter's life is plagued with problems on both sides. As Spider-Man, Mayor Fisk publicly supports him, condemning all other vigilantes in order to isolate him from his superhero peers. As Peter Parker, his academic credentials are revoked after accusations of plagiarizing his doctoral dissertation from Octavius, resulting in Peter being fired from the Daily Bugle. Subsequently, Peter again became romantically involved with Mary Jane. Briefly, Peter Parker and Spider-Man split into separate beings due to an accident involving the reverse-engineered Isotope Genome Accelerator. Peter eventually manages to reverse the process, and merges his two halves back together before the side-effects worsen and result in their death.

Kindred uses the resurrected Sin-Eater's sins to possess Miles Morales, Spider-Gwen, Spider-Woman, Anya Corazon, and Julia Carpenter. Doctor Strange, who manages to restrain a possessed Silk, agrees to help Spider-Man. However, Peter dies when fighting Kindred, but Kindred is willing to resurrect Peter.

== Personality and themes ==
"People often say glibly that Marvel succeeded by blending super hero adventure stories with soap opera. What Lee and Ditko actually did in The Amazing Spider-Man was to make the series an ongoing novelistic chronicle of the lead character's life. Most super heroes had problems no more complex or relevant to their readers' lives than thwarting this month's bad guys... Parker had far more serious concern in his life: coming to terms with the death of a loved one, falling in love for the first time, struggling to make a living, and undergoing crises of conscience."

— Comics historian Peter Sanderson

Sally Kempton for the Village Voice opined in 1965 that "Spider-Man has a terrible identity problem, a marked inferiority complex, and a fear of women. He is antisocial, castration-ridden, racked with Oedipal guilt, and accident-prone ... [a] functioning neurotic". Spider-Man's writers often describe him as an everyman who stands in for the average reader; he has also been characterized as one of the first nerd heroes. Comics scholar Phillip Lamarr Cunningham says that "[Peter] Parker arguably epitomizes the conflation of everyman and nerd better than any popular culture figure." Agonizing over his choices, always attempting to do right, he is nonetheless viewed with suspicion by the authorities, who seem unsure as to whether he is a helpful vigilante or a clever criminal.

Cultural historian Bradford W. Wright notes:

Spider-Man's plight was to be misunderstood and persecuted by the very public that he swore to protect. In the first issue of The Amazing Spider-Man, J. Jonah Jameson, publisher of the Daily Bugle, launches an editorial campaign against the "Spider-Man menace". The resulting negative publicity exacerbates popular suspicions about the mysterious Spider-Man and makes it impossible for him to earn any more money by performing. Eventually, the bad press leads the authorities to brand him an outlaw. Ironically, Peter finally lands a job as a photographer for Jameson's Daily Bugle.

The mid-1960s stories reflect the political tensions of the time; early 1960s Marvel stories often deal with the Cold War and communism. Wright writes:

From his high-school beginnings to his entry into college life, Spider-Man remained the superhero most relevant to the world of young people. Fittingly, then, his comic book also contained some of the earliest references to the politics of young people. In 1968, in the wake of actual militant student demonstrations at Columbia University, Peter Parker finds himself in the midst of similar unrest at his Empire State University.... Peter has to reconcile his natural sympathy for the students with his assumed obligation to combat lawlessness as Spider-Man. As a law-upholding liberal, he finds himself caught between militant leftism and angry conservatives.

Comics scholar Peter Lee identifies a theme of generational consciousness for Baby Boomers in Spider-Man stories of the 1960s, and an emphasis on a generation gap with their elders. Douglas Wolk emphasizes Parker's complex identity formation through conflict with paternal authority figures; many of his most prominent arch-enemies can be viewed as distorted father figures. Wolk also points out a continual theme of a frustrated bildungsroman, the classic narrative of transition from childhood to adulthood: Parker is often about to achieve the resolution of maturity before this progress is unfairly interrupted.

Mike Flanagan also points out Spider-Man's bond with New York City, and the complex metafictional relationship between the factual city and its representation in the fantastical world of superhero comics.

== Powers, skills, and equipment ==
Peter Parker was bitten by a radioactive spider and subsequently developed spider-powers such as the ability to stick to walls and climb surfaces, the proportionate strength, speed, agility, and reflexes of a spider, and a "spider-sense" that warns him of danger. Commentators have speculated that a distance-dependent interaction between his body and surfaces, known as the van der Waals force, accounts for his sticking ability.

The character was originally conceived by Stan Lee and Steve Ditko as intellectually gifted, and later writers have depicted his intellect at genius level. Academically brilliant, Peter has expertise in the fields of applied science, chemistry, physics, biology, engineering, mathematics, and mechanics.

Spider-Man designed his own web-shooters that depend on an organic fluid, and use them to swing at amazing speeds from building to building on these webs, and shoot at his enemies as fighting weapons. He also invented spider-tracers that he is able to track with his spider-sense.

== Supporting cast ==
Spider-Man contains a wide number of enemies and side characters. A variant cover art of The Amazing Spider-Man (vol. 3) #1 depicts the heads of various Spider-Man enemies behind Spider-Man (as drawn by Kevin Maguire), shown in the center.

Spider-Man has had a large range of supporting characters introduced in the comics that are essential in the issues and storylines that star him. After his parents died, Peter Parker was raised by his loving aunt, May Parker, and his uncle and father figure, Ben Parker. After Uncle Ben is murdered by a burglar, Aunt May is virtually Peter's only family, and she and Peter are very close.

J. Jonah Jameson is the publisher of the Daily Bugle and Peter Parker's boss. A harsh critic of Spider-Man, he constantly features negative articles about the superhero in his newspaper. Jameson can be interpreted as symbolic of demagogic, sensationalistic media. In contrast, Robbie Robertson, Jameson's editor and confidant, is always depicted as a supporter of both Spider-Man and his alter ego Peter Parker.

Eugene "Flash" Thompson is commonly depicted as Peter Parker's high school tormentor and bully, who idolizes Spider-Man, but is unaware that Spider-Man is Peter Parker. Later, he becomes a friend of Peter and adopts his own superhero identity, Agent Venom, after merging with the Venom symbiote. Meanwhile, Harry Osborn, son of Norman Osborn, is Peter's best friend, and experiences problems with drug addiction. Jonathan "Johnny" Storm (Human Torch) is initially depicted as a competitive rival to Peter, but over time becomes one of his closest friends.

=== Enemies ===
Writers and artists over the years have established a rogues gallery of supervillains to face Spider-Man, in comics and in other media. As with Spider-Man, the majority of the villains' powers originate with scientific accidents or the misuse of scientific technology, and many have animal-themed costumes or powers. Comics scholar Rick Hudson argues that Spider-Man's enemies are in some sense "'ordinary guys' living in a fantastical world", in contrast to the operatic, gothic villains who Batman faces. In the early period written by Steve Ditko, Spider-Man's enemies are usually older men whose power comes from scientific inventions.

The Norman Osborn version of the Green Goblin is most commonly regarded as Spider-Man's arch-enemy. While Norman is usually portrayed as an amoral industrialist and the head of the Oscorp scientific corporation, the Goblin is a psychopathic alternate personality, born after Norman's exposure to some unstable chemicals that also increased his strength and agility. The Goblin is a Halloween-themed villain, dressing up like an actual goblin and utilizing a large arsenal of high tech weapons, including a glider and pumpkin-shaped explosives. Unlike most villains, who only aim to kill Spider-Man, the Goblin also targets his loved ones and shows no remorse in killing them as long as it caused pain to Spider-Man. His most infamous feat is killing Gwen Stacy in "The Night Gwen Stacy Died." While the Goblin was killed in the same story, he returned in the 1990s to plague Spider-Man once again. He also came into conflict with other heroes, such as the Avengers. Norman is sometimes depicted as an enemy of Spider-Man, even when not being the Green Goblin.

Doctor Octopus (a.k.a. Doc Ock) is a highly intelligent mad scientist who uses four mechanical appendages for both movement and combat. He has been described as Spider-Man's greatest enemy, and the man Peter Parker might have become if he had not been raised with a sense of responsibility. Doc Ock is infamous for defeating him the first time in battle and for almost marrying Peter's Aunt May. He is also the core leader of the Sinister Six. Later stories depicted his mind in Peter Parker's body, where he acted as the titular character.

The Eddie Brock incarnation of Venom is often regarded as Spider-Man's deadliest foe, and has been described as an evil mirror version of Spider-Man in many ways. He is also among Spider-Man's most popular villains. Originally a reporter who grew to despise Spider-Man, Eddie later came into contact with the Venom symbiote, which had been rejected by Spider-Man. The symbiote merges with Eddie and gives him the same powers as Spider-Man, in addition to making him immune to the web-slinger's "spider-sense". Venom's main goal is to ruin Peter Parker's life and mentally confuse him in any way he can. The character has a sense of honor and justice, and later starred in his own comic book stories, where he is depicted as an antihero and has a desire to protect innocent people from harm. On several occasions, he and Spider-Man even put their differences aside and became allies.

=== Romantic interests ===
As a high-schooler, Peter Parker's romantic interests first included his first crush, fellow high-school student Liz Allan, and his first date, with Betty Brant, who was secretary to the Daily Bugle newspaper publisher J. Jonah Jameson. Peter eventually falls in love with his college girlfriend Gwen Stacy, daughter of New York City Police Department detective Captain George Stacy. Her father is killed by Doctor Octopus, and Gwen blames Spider-Man for his death, not realizing Peter's secret identity. Gwen Stacy later dies after being held hostage by the Green Goblin. The Green Goblin throws her from a bridge and Spider-Man attempts to save her, but a "snap" sound effect suggests that Spider-Man's web broke her neck when it interrupted her fall. The event of her death and ramifications are revisited in many subsequent storylines.

Mary Jane Watson is first introduced in 1965, but does not become fully visible until the following year. Peter's Aunt May constantly suggests her as a blind date, which Peter continually postpones. When he finally meets her, she declares "Face It Tiger.... You Just Hit the Jackpot!", which becomes a repeated catchphrase. They date off and on through storylines over subsequent decades. She becomes Peter's best friend; in a storyline of 1987, they marry. However, in a story written two decades later, their marriage is erased from the memory of the world by Mephisto, in exchange for saving Aunt May's life.

Felicia Hardy, the Black Cat, is a reformed cat burglar who was Spider-Man's only superhuman girlfriend and partner.

=== Children ===
The main incarnation of Spider-Man has never become a father. However, over the course of the comics, alternate versions of Peter Parker had biological children, usually with Mary Jane Watson. These include Spider-Girl (Mayday Parker) and Benjy Parker from the MC2 universe, and Spiderling (Annie Parker) from Earth-18119.

=== Alternate versions of Spider-Man ===
Within the Marvel Universe, there exists a multiverse with many variations of Spider-Man. An early character included in the 1980s is the fictional anthropomorphic animal parody of Spider-Man as a pig named Spider-Ham (Peter Porker). Many imprints of Spider-Men were created, like the futuristic version of Spider-Man in Marvel 2099 named Miguel O'Hara. In the Marvel Comics 2 imprint, Peter marries Mary Jane and has a daughter named Mayday Parker, who carries on Spider-Man's legacy, while Marvel Noir has a 1930s version of Peter Parker. Other themed versions exist within the early 2000s, such as a Marvel Mangaverse version and an Indian version from Spider-Man: India, Pavitr Prabhakar.

Ultimate Spider-Man was a popular modern retelling of Spider-Man, Peter Parker. The version of Peter Parker would later be depicted as being killed off and replaced by a Black Hispanic Spider-Man named Miles Morales.

The storyline "Spider-Verse" brought back many alternate takes on Spider-Man and introduced many new ones, such as an alternate world where Gwen Stacy gets bitten by a radioactive spider instead, along with a British-themed version named Spider-UK, who is Billy Braddock from the Captain Britain Corps.

== Reception and legacy ==
In The Creation of Spider-Man, comic book writer-editor and historian Paul Kupperberg calls the character's superpowers "nothing too original"; what was original was that outside his secret identity, he was a "nerdy high school student". Going against typical superhero fare, Spider-Man included "heavy doses of soap-opera and elements of melodrama". Kupperberg feels that Lee and Ditko had created something new in the world of comics: "the flawed superhero with everyday problems". This idea spawned a comics revolution. The insecurity and anxieties in Marvel's early 1960s comic books, such as The Amazing Spider-Man, The Incredible Hulk, The Fantastic Four, and The X-Men ushered in a new type of superhero, very different from the certain and all-powerful superheroes before them, and changed the public's perception of them. Later stories also affected the genre of superhero comics. Historians of the genre have argued that the dark, pessimistic conclusion of the 1973 story "The Night Gwen Stacy Died" is partly responsible for the shift from the idealistic Silver Age of Comic Books to the more violent and troubled Bronze Age of Comic Books.

Spider-Man has become one of the most recognizable fictional characters in the world, and has been used to sell toys, games, cereal, candy, soap, and many other products. After the comics depicted a real address in Forest Hills, Queens, New York City, as May Parker's residence, its residents received many letters from children to the superhero. He has been used as the company mascot. When Marvel became the first comic book company to be listed on the New York Stock Exchange in 1991, The Wall Street Journal announced "Spider-Man is coming to Wall Street"; the event was in turn promoted with an actor in a Spider-Man costume accompanying Stan Lee to the Stock Exchange. Comics scholars Robert G. Weiner and Robert Moses Peaslee argue that Spider-Man is the clear flagship character of Marvel Comics and one of the best-known superheroes worldwide, only rivaled by Batman and Superman. They draw from research that indicates he is a globally recognizable character. They cite statistics that from 1966 to 2012 The Amazing Spider-Man sold an estimated 145-150 million copies. In 2014, Spider-Man was considered the world's most profitable superhero. Also in 2014, global retail sales of licensed products related to Spider-Man reached approximately $1.3 billion. Comparatively, this amount exceeds the global licensing revenue of Batman, Superman, and the Avengers combined.

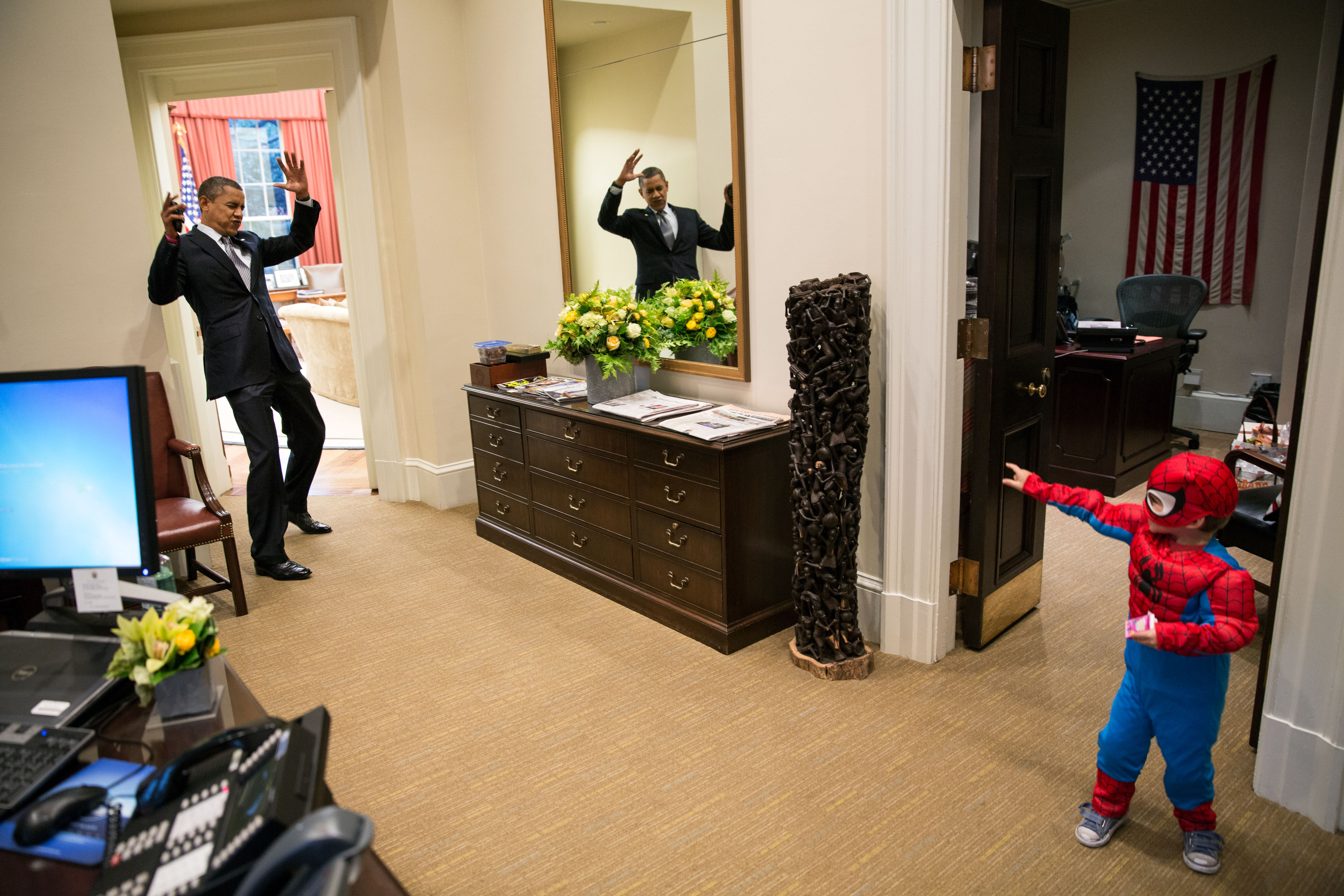
U.S. president Barack Obama pretending to be webbed up by a boy dressed in a Spider-Man costume inside the White House

Spider-Man joined the Macy's Thanksgiving Day Parade from 1987 to 1998 as one of the balloon floats, designed by John Romita Sr., one of the character's signature artists. A new, different Spider-Man balloon float also appeared from 2009 to 2014.

When Marvel wanted to issue a story dealing with the immediate aftermath of the September 11 attacks, the company chose the November 2001 issue of The Amazing Spider-Man. In 2006, Spider-Man garnered major media coverage with the revelation of the character's secret identity, an event detailed in a full-page story in the New York Post before the issue containing the story was even released.

In 2008, Marvel announced plans to release a series of educational comics the following year in partnership with the United Nations, depicting Spider-Man alongside the UN Peacekeeping Forces to highlight UN peacekeeping missions. A BusinessWeek article listed Spider-Man as one of the top 10 most intelligent fictional characters in American comics.

In 2015, the Supreme Court of the United States decided Kimble v. Marvel Entertainment, LLC, a case concerning royalties on a patent for an imitation web shooter. The opinion for the Court, by Justice Elena Kagan, included several Spider-Man references, concluding with the statement that "with great power, there must also come—great responsibility".

Spider-Man has become a subject of scientific inquiry. In 1987, researchers at Loyola University conducted a study into the utility of Spider-Man comics for informing children and parents about issues relating to child abuse.

The culmination of nearly every superhero that came before him, Spider-Man is the hero of heroes. He's got fun and cool powers, but not on the god-like level of Thor. He's just a normal guy with girlfriend problems and money issues, so he's more relatable than playboy billionaire Iron Man. And he's an awkward teenager, not a wizened adult like Captain America. Not too hot and not too cold, Spider-Man is just right.

— IGN staff on placing Spider-Man as the number one hero of Marvel.

In 2005, Bravo's Ultimate Super Heroes, Vixens, and Villains TV series declared that Spider-Man was the number 1 superhero. Empire magazine ranked him the fifth-greatest comic book character of all time. Wizard magazine placed Spider-Man as the third-greatest comic book character on their website. In 2011, Spider-Man placed third on IGN's Top 100 Comic Book Heroes of All Time, behind DC Comics characters Superman and Batman, and sixth in their 2012 list of "The Top 50 Avengers". In 2014, IGN identified Spider-Man the greatest Marvel Comics character of all time. A 2015 poll at Comic Book Resources named Spider-Man the greatest Marvel character of all time. IGN described him as the common everyman that represents many normal people, but also noted his uniqueness compared to many superheroes with his depicted flaws as a superhero. IGN wrote that despite being one of the most tragic superheroes of all time, he is "one of the most fun and snarky superheroes in existence." Empire praised Spider-Man's always-present sense of humor and wisecracks in the face of the many tragedies he faces. The magazine website appraised the depiction of his "iconic" superhero poses, describing it as "a top artist's dream".

In 2022, Penguin Random House released a Penguin Classics edition of the first issues of Spider-Man as part of a line of Penguin Classics editions of other Marvel characters.

=== Real-life comparisons ===
Real-life people who have been compared to Spider-Man for their climbing feats include:

- In 1981, the skyscraper-safety activist Dan Goodwin, wearing a Spider-Man suit, scaled the Sears Tower in Chicago, Illinois, the Renaissance Tower in Dallas, Texas, and the John Hancock Center in Chicago, earning the nickname "Spider Dan."
- Alain Robert, nicknamed "Spider-Man", is a rock and urban climber who has scaled more than 70 tall buildings using his hands and feet, without using additional devices. He sometimes wears a Spider-Man suit during his climbs. In May 2003, he was paid approximately $18,000 to climb the 95-meter (312 ft) Lloyd's building to promote the premiere of the movie Spider-Man on the British television channel Sky Movies.
- "The Human Spider", alias Bill Strother, scaled the Lamar Building in Augusta, Georgia, in 1921.
- In Argentina, criminals that climb buildings and trespass into private property through the open balconies are said to use the "Spider-Man method" (in Spanish, el Hombre Araña).

== In other media ==
Spider-Man in film
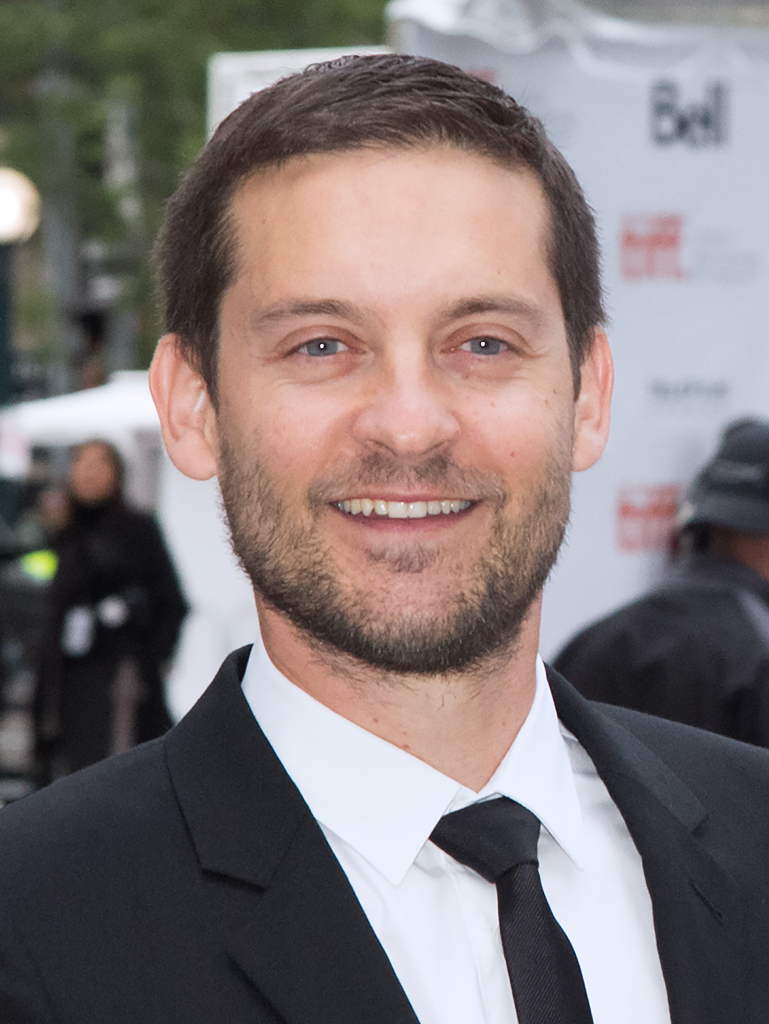
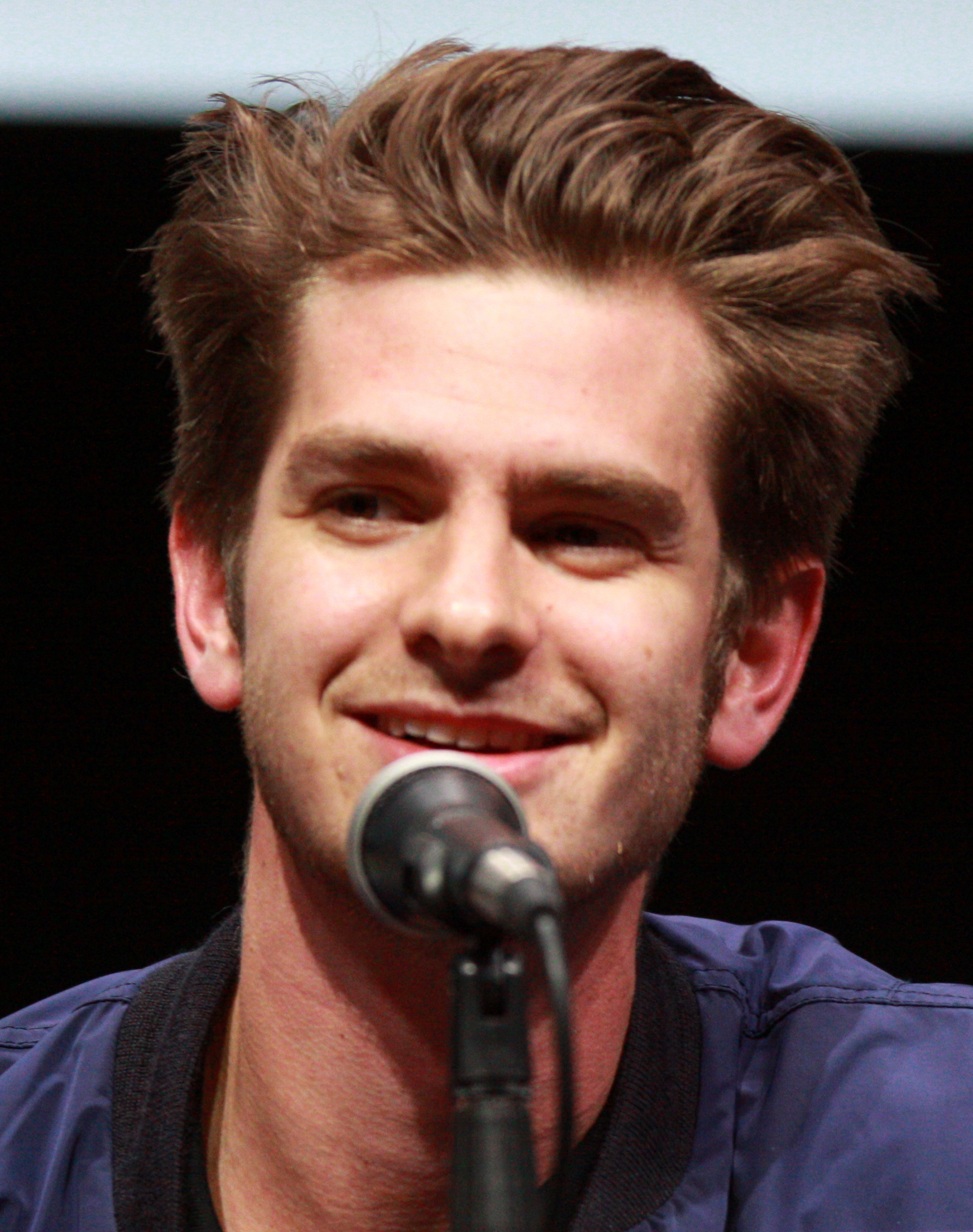
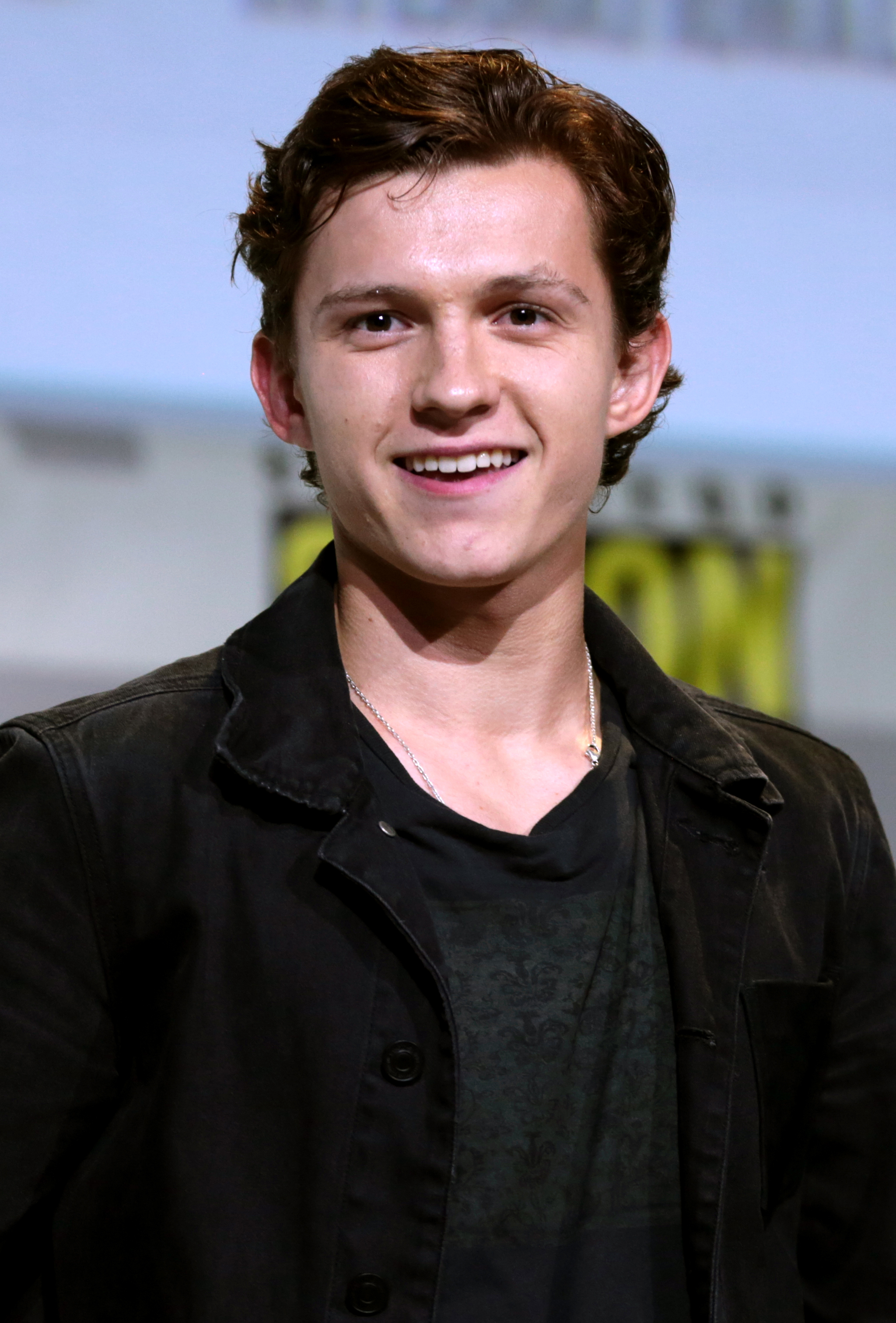
Tobey Maguire (left), Andrew Garfield (center), and Tom Holland (right) have portrayed Spider-Man in film.

Spider-Man has appeared in comics, cartoons, films, video games, coloring books, novels, records, children's books, and theme park rides. On television, he first starred in the ABC animated series Spider-Man (1967–1970), Spidey Super Stories (1974–1977) on PBS, and the CBS live-action series The Amazing Spider-Man (1978–1979), starring Nicholas Hammond. Other animated series featuring the superhero include the syndicated Spider-Man (1981–1982), Spider-Man and His Amazing Friends (1981–1983), Fox Kids' Spider-Man: The Animated Series (1994–1998), Spider-Man Unlimited (1999–2001), Spider-Man: The New Animated Series (2003), The Spectacular Spider-Man (2008–2009), Ultimate Spider-Man (2012–2017), Disney XD's Spider-Man (2017–2020), and Spidey and His Amazing Friends (2021–present). Spider-Man was first portrayed in live-action in Spidey Super Stories, a recurring skit on The Electric Company from 1974 to 1977.

A tokusatsu series featuring Spider-Man was produced by Toei and aired in Japan. It is commonly referred to by its Japanese pronunciation Supaidā-Man. Spider-Man also appeared in other print forms besides the comics, including novels, children's books, and the daily newspaper comic strip The Amazing Spider-Man, which debuted in January 1977, with the earliest installments written by Stan Lee and drawn by John Romita Sr. Spider-Man has been adapted to other media including games, toys, collectibles, and miscellaneous memorabilia, and has appeared as the main character in numerous computer and video games on over 15 gaming platforms.

Spider-Man was featured in a trilogy of live-action films directed by Sam Raimi and starring Tobey Maguire as the titular superhero. The first Spider-Man film of the trilogy was released on May 3, 2002, followed by Spider-Man 2 (2004) and Spider-Man 3 (2007). A third sequel was originally scheduled to be released in 2011; however, Sony later decided to reboot the franchise with a new director and cast. The reboot, titled The Amazing Spider-Man, was released on July 3, 2012, directed by Marc Webb, and starred Andrew Garfield as the new Spider-Man. It was followed by The Amazing Spider-Man 2 (2014). In 2015, Sony and Disney made a deal for Spider-Man to appear in the Marvel Cinematic Universe. Tom Holland made his debut as Spider-Man in the MCU film Captain America: Civil War (2016), before later starring in his standalone film Spider-Man: Homecoming (2017), directed by Jon Watts. Holland reprised his role as Spider-Man in Avengers: Infinity War (2018), Avengers: Endgame (2019), Spider-Man: Far From Home (2019), Spider-Man: No Way Home (2021), and Spider-Man: Brand New Day (2026). Maguire and Garfield reprise their roles in No Way Home. Jake Johnson voiced an alternate universe version of Spider-Man in the animated film Spider-Man: Into the Spider-Verse, and reprised the role in its sequel Spider-Man: Across the Spider-Verse (2023). Chris Pine also voiced another version of Peter Parker in Into the Spider-Verse. In 2021, Hudson Thames was cast as the voice of Spider-Man in animated anthology series What If...?, replacing Tom Holland. He later reprised the role for animated series Your Friendly Neighborhood Spider-Man (2025).

Following a brief contract dispute over financial terms, in 2019, Sony and Disney reached a deal to allow Spider-Man to return to the MCU, with the two studios jointly producing Spider-Man films.

A Broadway musical, Spider-Man: Turn Off the Dark, began previews on November 14, 2010, at the Foxwoods Theatre on Broadway, with the official opening night on June 14, 2011. Reeve Carney originally played the starring role. The music and lyrics were written by Bono and The Edge of the rock group U2, with a book by Julie Taymor, Glen Berger, and Roberto Aguirre-Sacasa. Turn Off the Dark is currently the most expensive musical in Broadway history, costing an estimated $70 million. In addition, the show's unusually high running costs are reported to have been about $1.2 million per week.

In the fine arts, since the Pop Art period of the 1960s, the character of Spider-Man has been "appropriated" by multiple visual artists and incorporated into contemporary artwork, including Andy Warhol, Roy Lichtenstein, Mel Ramos, Vijay, Dulce Pinzon, Mr. Brainwash, and F. Lennox Campello.

In 2025, Chicago's Griffin Museum of Science and Industry opened Marvel's Spider-Man: Beyond Amazing – The Exhibition. It spans two galleries. The Chicago Tribune reports, "The first is dedicated to building the character; the other to its ripening and expansion," and the exhibit includes archival material not from Marvel or DC but from eight collectors, as well as film props and a final station with supplies that enable visitors to draw their own interpretation of Spider-Man.

== See also ==
- List of Spider-Man storylines
- List of Marvel Comics superhero debuts
- Outline of Spider-Man

== Bibliography ==
- Bell, Blake (2008). Strange and Stranger: The World of Steve Ditko. Fantagraphic Books. pp. 54–57.
- Blumberg, Arnold T. (Spring 2006). "'The Night Gwen Stacy Died': The End of Innocence and the 'Last Gasp of the Silver Age'". International Journal of Comic Art. 8 (1).
- Cebulski, C.B., ed. (2024). Marvel Encyclopedia: New Edition. DK. ISBN 978-0-593-84611-7.
- Cowsill, Alan (2012). Gilbert, Laura (ed.). Spider-Man Chronicle Celebrating 50 Years of Web-Slinging. Dorling Kindersley. ISBN 978-0756692360.
- Daniels, Les (1991). Marvel: Five Fabulous Decades of the World's Greatest Comics. Harry N. Abrams. ISBN 0-8109-3821-9.
- DeFalco, Tom; Lee, Stan (2001). O'Neill, Cynthia (ed.). Spider-Man: The Ultimate Guide. New York: Dorling Kindersley. ISBN 978-0-7894-7946-4.
- Ditko, Steve (Winter 1999). "An Insider's Part of Comics History Jack Kirby's Spider-Man". Alter Ego (3): 56–59.
- Evanier, Mark; Gaiman, Neil (2008). Kirby: King of Comics. Abrams. ISBN 978-0-8109-9447-8.
- Grundhauser, Eric (2026). Spider-Man for Dummies. Marvel. ISBN 978-1-394-29932-4.
- Harrington, Richard (February 4, 1992). "Stan Lee: Caught in Spidey's Web". The Washington Post. Archived from the original on November 23, 2020.
- Kempton, Sally (April 1, 1965). "Spider-Man: Super-Anti-Hero In Forest Hills". The Village Voice. Archived from the original on November 20, 2023.
- Lee, Stan; Mair, George (2002). Excelsior!: The Amazing Life of Stan Lee. Fireside. ISBN 978-0-684-87305-3.
- Manning, Matthew K. (2012). Gilbert, Laura (ed.). Spider-Man Chronicle Celebrating 50 Years of Web-Slinging. Dorling Kindersley. ISBN 978-0756692360.
- Mondello, Salvatore (March 2004). "Spider-Man: Superhero in the Liberal Tradition". The Journal of Popular Culture. X (1): 232–238. doi:10.1111/j.0022-3840.1976.1001_232.x.
- Murray, Will (August 2020). "The Secret Origin of Spider-Man". RetroFan (10). United States: TwoMorrows Publishing: 24–29.
- Peaslee, Robert Moses; Weiner, Robert G., eds. (2012). Web-Spinning Heroics: Critical Essays on the History and Meaning of Spider-Man. McFarland & Company. ISBN 978-0-7864-4627-8.
  - Cunningham, Phillip Lamarr. "Donald Glover for Spider-Man". In Peaslee & Weiner (2012), pp. 22-28.
  - Drucker, Aaron. "Spider-Man: MENACE!!! Stan Lee, Censorship and the 100-Issue Revolution". In Peaslee & Weiner (2012), pp. 90-100.
  - Flanagan, Martin. "'Continually in the Making': Spider-Man's New York". In Peaslee & Weiner (2012), pp. 40-52.
  - Hudson, Rick. "The Sinister Six: Anti-Villains in an Anti-Heroic Narrative". In Peaslee & Weiner (2012), pp. 128-133.
  - Lee, Peter. "Have Great Power, Greatly Irresponsible: Intergenerational Conflict in 1960s Amazing Spider-Man". In Peaslee & Weiner (2012), pp. 29-39.
  - McWilliams, Ora C. "The Incorrigible Aunt May". In Peaslee & Weiner (2012), pp. 187-194.
  - Royal, Derek Parter. "Strategies of Narration in Jeph Loeb and Tim Sale's Spider-Man Blue". In Peaslee & Weiner (2012), pp. 81-88.
  - Weiner, Robert G. "Three Stories, Three Movies and the Romances of Mary Jane and Spider-Man". In Peaslee & Weiner (2012), pp. 166-176.
  - Weiner, Robert G.; Peaslee, Robert Moses. Introduction. In Peaslee & Weiner (2012), pp. 4-21.
- Ridout, Cefn, ed. (2022). Marvel Year By Year: A Visual History: New Edition. DK. ISBN 978-0-7440-5451-4.
  - Manning, Matthew K. "2000s". In Ridout (2022), pp. 280-333.
  - Sanderson, Peter. "1970s". In Ridout (2022), pp. 136-183.
  - Wiacek, Stephen (Win). "2010s". In Ridout (2022), pp. 334-379.
- Saffel, Steve (2007). Spider-Man the Icon: The Life and Times of a Pop Culture Phenomenon. Titan Books. ISBN 978-1-84576-324-4.
- Sanderson, Peter (1998). Marvel Universe: The Complete Encyclopedia of Marvel's Greatest Characters. Harry N. Abrams. ISBN 0-8109-8171-8.
- Sanderson, Peter (2007). The Marvel Comics Guide to New York City. Pocket Books. ISBN 978-1-4165-3141-8.
- Saunders, Ben, ed. (2022). The Amazing Spider-Man by Stan Lee and Steve Ditko. Penguin Books. ISBN 978-0-14-313572-2.
- Simon, Joe (2011). Joe Simon: My Life in Comics. London, UK: Titan Books. ISBN 978-1-84576-930-7.
- Theakston, Greg (2002). The Steve Ditko Reader. Brooklyn, New York: Pure Imagination. ISBN 978-1-56685-011-7.
- Thomas, Roy (August 2011). "Stan Lee's Amazing Marvel Interview!". Alter Ego (104). TwoMorrows Publishing: 3–45.
- Wilkins, Jonathan, ed. (2022). Spider-Man: The First 60 Years. Titan Books. ISBN 978-1787739369.
- Wolk, Douglas (2021). All of the Marvels: A Journey to the Ends of the Biggest Story Ever Told. Penguin Press. ISBN 978-0-7352-2216-8.
- Wright, Bradford W. (2001). Comic Book Nation. Baltimore: Johns Hopkins Press. ISBN 978-0-8018-7450-5. OCLC 53175529.
