= Spider-Man in literature =

Since the characters inception in the 1960s Spider-Man has appeared in multiple forms of media, including several novels, short stories, comic strips, graphic novels, light novels and children's books.

== Comics ==
The main form of literature which in Spider-Man has appeared in is comic books.

=== Serialized ===
There have been over 200 separate Spider-Man comic book series, both ongoing series and limited series ranging from two to 500 issues.

=== Singles ===
There have been several published graphic novels with the character in the main role, including The Amazing Spider-Man: Hooky from 1986, The Amazing Spider-Man: Parallel Lives from 1989, The Amazing Spider-Man: Spirits of the Earth from 1990, Spider-Man: Fear Itself from 1992, Spider-Man: Season One from 2012 and Amazing Spider-Man: Family Business from 2014. There have also been many Spider-Man one-shots, specials and annuals.

=== Strips ===
There have been two Spider-Man comic strips, The Amazing Spider-Man and Mr. and Mrs. Spider-Man.

== Prose ==
=== Short stories ===
In 1994 Marvel published The Ultimate Spider-Man, a short story collection edited by Stan Lee. It features a short story named "An Evening in the Bronx with Venom" by Keith R.A. DeCandido, among others. The Untold Tales of Spider-Man from 1997 is another short story collection, it was inspired by the Untold Tales of Spider-Man comic book series from 1995 to 1997, which was also written by Kurt Busiek. This book was also edited by Stan Lee.

=== Single works ===
There have been more than 20 Spider-Man novels, ranging from original works to adaptions of unused comic scripts to novelizations of his films. The character has also appeared in several other novels not about him specifically, such as novelizations of well-known comic book events like "Civil War".

=== Series ===
There are six major book series with the character of Spider-Man as the main focus. The "Duane trilogy" is a trilogy of Spider-Man books by Diane Duane, Spider-Man Super Thriller is a young adult novel series by several writers, the Doom's Day trilogy is a series of books by several authors, X-Men and Spider-Man: Time's Arrow is another trilogy by Tom DeFalco with a co-writer on each book and the latest Spider-Man book series is the Sinister Six trilogy, which was written by Adam-Troy Castro.

== Children's books ==
=== Storybooks ===
Several Spider-Man children's books have been published, from early readers to light novels.

=== Coloring and activity books ===
Spider-Man has been the subject of several coloring and activity books, from many companies such as Giddy-Up!, Kappa, Parragon/Scholastic, Peter Haddock, Alligator, Bendon, Funtastic, Golden Books, HarperCollins, Hunter Leisure, Meredith, Modern Publishing and Tri-Coastal.

== See also ==
- List of novels based on comics
- Wonder Woman in literature
