= Spider-Man Lives: A Miles Morales Story =

2015 film

- Film poster
- Directed by: Ivan Kander
- Written by: Ivan Kander
- Distributed by: Bard Tales Productions; YouTube
- Release date: 2015
- Running time: 9 minutes
- Country: United States
- Language: English

Spider-Man Lives: A Miles Morales Story is a 2015 Spider-Man fan film.

== Plot ==
In the wake of Peter Parker's death, a boy named Miles Morales finds the courage to put on the mask and become Spider-Man.

== Cast ==
- Demetrius Stephens as Miles Morales / Spider-Man
- Juliana Thornhill as Rio Morales
- Michael J. Patterson as Jefferson Davis
- Diane Samuelson as Lana Baumgartner
- Tyris Lee as Young Henchman
- Patrick McDaniel as Frank Oliver
- Terence Heffernan as Police Officer

== Reception ==
Joey Paur of Geektyrant stated that someone who is a fan of Spider-Man, specifically the Miles Morales version of the web-slinger, would probably enjoy the film. He also stated that the film gave a solid idea of what a live-action version of the character might be like.

== See also ==
- Spider-Man, a 1969 fan film
- Spider-Man Versus Kraven the Hunter, a 1974 fan film
- The Green Goblin's Last Stand, a 1992 fan film
- Viva Spider-Man, a 1989 fan film
