= Spider-Man in film =

Film adaptations of the Marvel Comics character

Adaptations of Spider-Man in other media
- Spider-Man actors in cinema, left to right: Tobey Maguire, Andrew Garfield and Tom Holland.
- Original source: Comics published by Marvel Comics
- First appearance: Amazing Fantasy #15 (August 1962)

Films and television
- Film(s): TV films; Spider-Man (1977); Spider-Man Strikes Back (1979); Spider-Man: The Dragon's Challenge (1981); Sam Raimi trilogy; Spider-Man (2002); Spider-Man 2 (2004); Spider-Man 3 (2007); Marc Webb duology; The Amazing Spider-Man (2012); The Amazing Spider-Man 2 (2014); Marvel Cinematic Universe (MCU); Captain America: Civil War (2016); Spider-Man: Homecoming (2017); Avengers: Infinity War (2018); Avengers: Endgame (2019); Spider-Man: Far From Home (2019); Spider-Man: No Way Home (2021) (Note: Features different versions of the Peter Parker / Spider-Man character: the MCU version played by Tom Holland, the Sam Raimi trilogy version played by Tobey Maguire, and the Amazing Spider-Man version played by Andrew Garfield); Spider-Man: Brand New Day (2026); Spider-Verse trilogy; Spider-Man: Into the Spider-Verse (2018); Spider-Man: Across the Spider-Verse (2023); Spider-Man: Beyond the Spider-Verse (2027); Sony's Spider-Man Universe (SSU); Venom (2018); Venom: Let There Be Carnage (2021); Morbius (2022); Madame Web (2024); Venom: The Last Dance (2024); Kraven the Hunter (2024)

Spider-Man, a superhero character created by Stan Lee and Steve Ditko for American comic books published by Marvel Comics, has appeared in virtually every form of media, including film since the 1970s. CBS's television film pilot for the program The Amazing Spider-Man in 1977 represents the first Spider-Man live-action adaptation. Marvel Comics spent the 1980s pursuing plans for a feature film, in a tumultuous development involving multiple directors, writers, and financiers. After protracted litigation over the Spider-Man copyrights, Sony Pictures and its subsidiary Columbia obtained the film rights for $7 million from Marvel in 1999.

In the 2000s, Columbia developed a trilogy of films starring Tobey Maguire as Spider-Man, which includes Spider-Man (2002), Spider-Man 2 (2004), and Spider-Man 3 (2007). The original film, in particular, greatly influenced Hollywood's conception of superheroes. This was followed by a reboot series featuring Andrew Garfield as Spider-Man, consisting of The Amazing Spider-Man (2012) and The Amazing Spider-Man 2 (2014). Sony then licensed the rights to Marvel Studios in a renewed agreement, yielding a succession of films that incorporated the character into the Marvel Cinematic Universe (MCU). The MCU features a version of Spider-Man played by Tom Holland, beginning with Captain America: Civil War (2016). The animated Spider-Verse centers on a cast of Spider-Men led by Miles Morales, the main protagonist voiced by Shameik Moore. Sony's Spider-Man Universe (SSU) operates with a loosely shared continuity to all existing Spider-Man film franchises but does not explicitly feature the character. Amateur films about Spider-Man explore a range of interpretations from ordinary people.

The mainstream Spider-Man films have been highly successful and make up the second highest-grossing film franchise of all time, collectively grossing over $13 billion worldwide. Critical opinion of films skew positive, and some have garnered Academy Awards recognition for achievement in visual effects and animation.

== Early adaptations ==
=== TV films ===
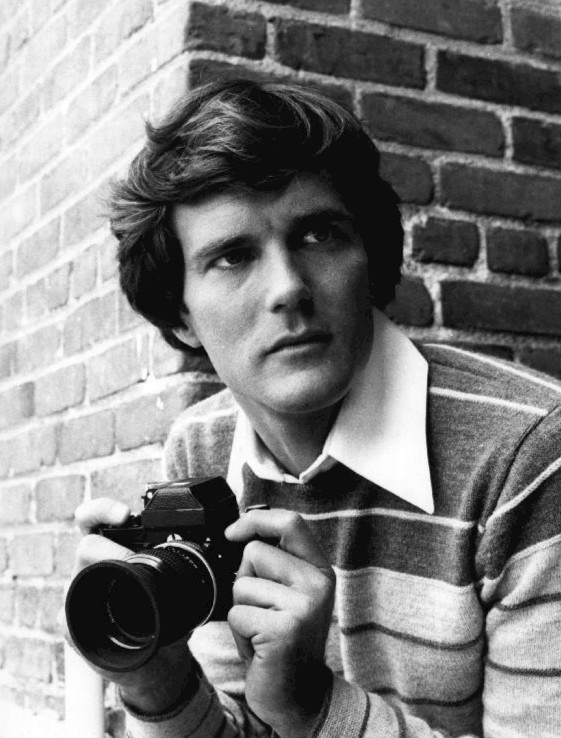
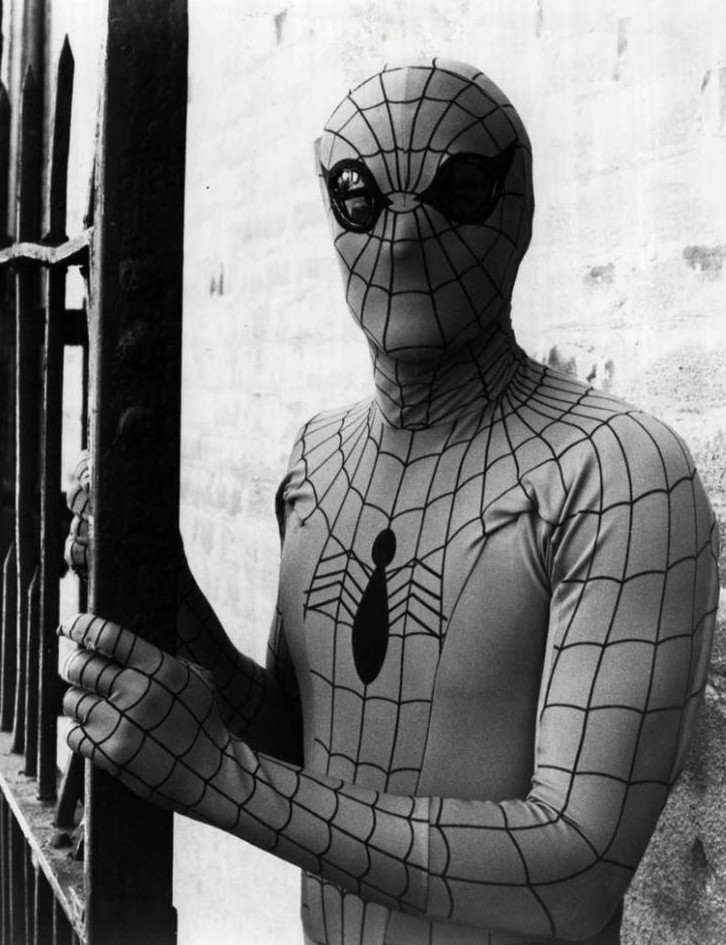
Nicholas Hammond in character on The Amazing Spider-Man set (1977)

Spider-Man is the superhero persona of high school student Peter Parker, a character created by Marvel Comics writer-editor Stan Lee and Steve Ditko in 1962 to entice teenage readers. In the 1970s, Marvel partnered with CBS to produce a TV adaptation of the character. The Marvel–CBS partnership yielded three Spider-Man TV films starring Nicholas Hammond for the live-action program The Amazing Spider-Man, which aired sporadically for thirteen episodes. The first film, Spider-Man (1977), follows the character's quest to thwart an extortionist's plot to kill a group of civilians with a mind control device. Two sequels, Spider-Man Strikes Back (1979) and Spider-Man: The Dragon's Challenge (1981), were composites of individual episodes of The Amazing Spider-Man. Each film received minor distribution in theaters outside of the United States.

A Japanese Spider-Man adaptation was conceived in the same period. Part of a four-year licensing deal with Marvel, Toei Company developed a theatrical film, Spider-Man (1978), as a spinoff to the live-action tokusatsu series of the same name, commonly referred to by its Japanese pronunciation Supaidāman. The film's origin story is a significant departure from the source material, portraying Spider-Man as the alter ego of a motorcyclist seeking to avenge his deceased father with powers inherited from Garia, the lone survivor of the extinct Spider Planet.

=== Feature film development ===
After the success of Superman (1978), Marvel began a concerted effort to produce feature film projects. They abandoned several early Spider-Man proposals, including a musical and another concept culminating in a battle against Nazis and a 100-foot robot. By 1982, Roger Corman, an experienced producer of low-budget B films, optioned the rights to develop an adaptation with Orion Pictures from Lee's film treatment. Lee's original treatment featured Doctor Octopus as the primary antagonist and a subplot of nuclear war with the Soviet Union. However, Lee and Corman ended their collaboration when they could not agree on a budget.

The Cannon Group executives Menahem Golan and Yoram Globus acquired the film rights to Spider-Man for $225,000 in 1985, with a provision that would restore ownership to Marvel should a film not be made within five years. They brought on Tobe Hooper to outline an origin story with screenwriter Leslie Stevens, the result being one depicting Spider-Man as a literal spider. Lee, upset with the changes, persuaded Cannon to discard the work and begin anew. Joseph Zito replaced Hooper as director, and a script was concocted from a pitch developed by Ted Newsom and John Brancato. In total, Cannon spent $2 million on a script and subsequent rewrites, but financial woes and disputes over the artistic direction frustrated the development.

After Pathé Communications purchased Cannon, Golan and Globus split, and the Spider-Man film rights transferred to Golan's 21st Century Film Corporation through a severance package, before being sold to Carolco Pictures for $5 million in 1988. Carolco hired James Cameron as director and screenwriter with a stipulation that granted him authority over the distribution of producing credits, similar to his contract for Terminator 2: Judgment Day (1991), another Carolco production. Cameron's scriptment, which was about 57 pages long, concentrated on Spider-Man as a morally ambiguous character. In the meantime, Carolco extended Cannon's original deal with Marvel to May 1996, but the total cost of production rose to $50 million from its initial $15 million budget, leading the company to abandon the project by 1992.

Protracted litigation ensued over the disposition of the Spider-Man copyrights, with Golan suing Carolco in 1993 over the claim that it had violated his contractually guaranteed credit as producer in the Cannon–Marvel agreement. Carolco then sued Viacom and Sony subsidiary Columbia Pictures over the syndication and home video rights, which Golan had sold them in separate sales, and the two studios countersued in lawsuits that, additionally, disputed Marvel's ownership stakes. 20th Century Fox, though not a main party in the litigation, contested Cameron's participation with a claim of exclusivity on his services as a director. By the mid-1990s, Carolco, 21st Century, and Marvel filed for bankruptcy, complicating the dispute. Metro-Goldwyn-Mayer (MGM) purchased all 21st Century-owned assets and Carolco's film rights during the proceedings, and instigated another lawsuit alleging fraud in the Cannon–Marvel deal. According to a 2002 report from the Los Angeles Times, legal inquiries found that Marvel's licensing agreements overlapped, sometimes on dubious terms.

After Marvel reemerged from bankruptcy in 1998, the courts ruled that the rights sold to Golan had expired, reverting the rights to the company. The studios spent the following year settling the remaining lawsuits, owing in part to soaring attorney fees. Marvel settled with Sony in a merchandising joint venture that conveyed the rights to produce film, television, and sequels to Sony and subsidiary Columbia for $7 million. At the same time, MGM compromised with Sony by surrendering its claim to the Spider-Man film rights in exchange for rights to Casino Royale (2006) and the global distribution rights to all subsequent James Bond films. Sony's ownership is perpetual provided that they release a new Spider-Man film at least once every five years.

== Sam Raimi trilogy ==
=== Spider-Man (2002) ===
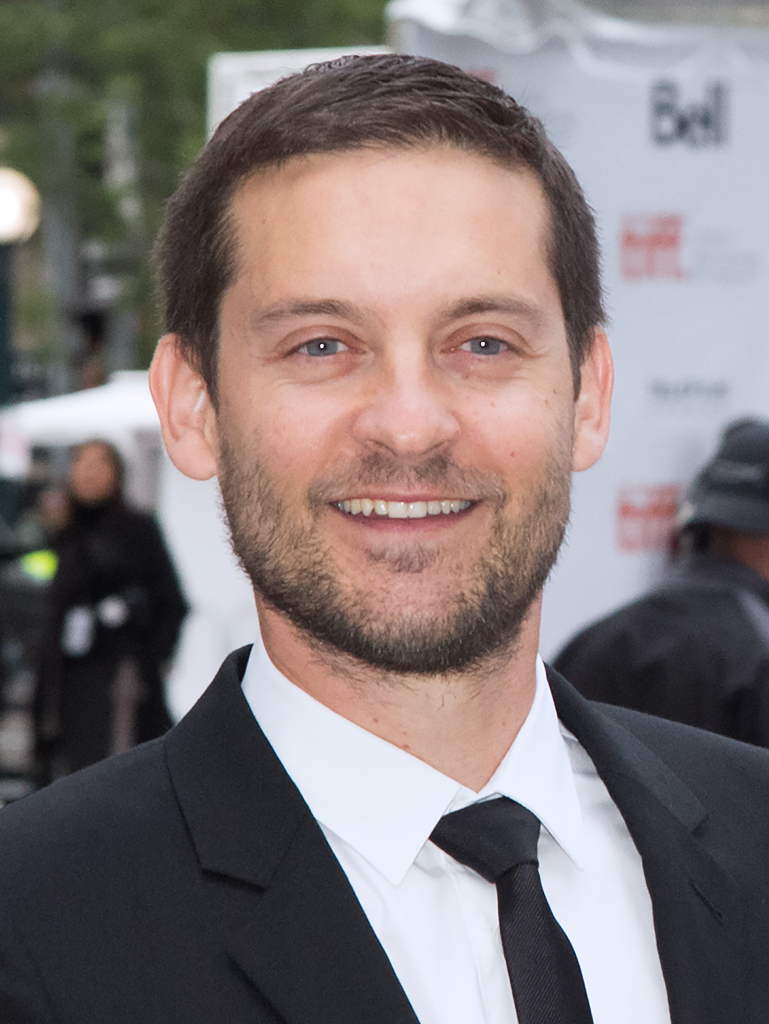
Tobey Maguire in 2014

Columbia began developing Spider-Man after their rights acquisition in 1999. Sam Raimi was not an immediate favorite to direct the film, but producers appointed him director because they were impressed with his enthusiasm. Screenwriter David Koepp was hired to write the Spider-Man script, expanding on ideas introduced in Cameron's treatment. The script was revised under Scott Rosenberg and again by Alvin Sargent to improve dialogue. Columbia signed Tobey Maguire to a three-picture, $3–4 million pay-or-play contract as Peter Parker in July 2000, which stipulated greater compensation for subsequent films. Maguire was Raimi's preferred choice based on his performance in The Cider House Rules (1999). Leonardo DiCaprio, Freddie Prinze Jr., Heath Ledger, Scott Speedman and Wes Bentley were among the actors Columbia considered to star.

Spider-Man explores Peter's struggles adapting to his newfound superpowers, which he acquires from the bite of a genetically engineered spider. After the death of his uncle Ben (Cliff Robertson), Peter vows to contain crime in New York, climaxing in a confrontation with the Green Goblin (Willem Dafoe). Spider-Man was shot from January to June 2001, and released in May 2002 after Sony extended the post-production schedule. It emerged as the third highest-grossing film of 2002 with $825 million globally, and was nominated for Best Visual Effects and Best Sound at the 75th Academy Awards. Spider-Man was a catalyst in the rise of superhero film and greatly influenced Hollywood conception of superheroes.

=== Spider-Man 2 (2004) ===
A sequel to Spider-Man was announced by Columbia in April 2002. The studio re-hired most of the filmmaking crew responsible for the creation of the original film. The completed script coalesced from a draft conceived by Koepp, Alfred Gough, and Miles Millar, with Sargent credited as the lead screenwriter. Maguire received an upfront salary of $17 million after months of negotiations for a new contract. The actor complained of persistent pain in his back sustained while shooting Seabiscuit (2003), and Columbia fired him as they considered his behavior disruptive. The studio reversed its decision when Ronald Meyer, the then-president of Vivendi Universal and Maguire's father-in-law, intervened.

The Spider-Man 2 plot was partially inspired by the "Spider-Man No More!" story arc in The Amazing Spider-Man comics. Peter's powers become impotent as a result of strife in his daily life, forcing him to repudiate his duties as Spider-Man. Meanwhile, his mentor Dr. Otto Octavius (Alfred Molina) conducts a nuclear experiment that corrupts the tentacled contraption fused to his spine and then his mind, transforming him into Doctor Octopus, a mad scientist committed to creating a fusion reactor to destroy New York. Filming occurred in 2003, and Spider-Man 2 premiered in theaters in June 2004. The film won Best Visual Effects at the 77th Academy Awards.

=== Spider-Man 3 (2007) ===
Because the studio wanted to commence soon on a sequel, Raimi and his brother Ivan spent about two months preparing a treatment while Spider-Man 2 ran in theaters. Sargent returned to write a screenplay following the direction of the Raimi treatment. The filmmakers were interested in resolving the character arcs with a tale of redemption and forgiveness. They also developed the script with an emphasis on Peter's evolving relationship with Mary Jane Watson (Kirsten Dunst). Spider-Man 3 sees Peter facing multiple threats, including Flint Marko / Sandman (Thomas Haden Church), an extraterrestrial symbiote that nearly consumes him, and Edward "Eddie" Brock Jr. / Venom (Topher Grace). Filming took place from January to July 2006, and the film was released in May 2007. Despite ending the theatrical run grossing $890.9 million, Spider-Man 3 drew mixed reviews in the media.

=== Cancellation of Spider-Man 4 ===
Franchise logo from 2002 to 2007

Media coverage of Spider-Man 4 gives contradictory accounts about the project's development. One report disseminated by Deadline Hollywood said Sony was prioritizing the sequel to shoot back-to-back with a fifth film. However, Raimi maintained in a 2009 interview that the studio pursued only Spider-Man 4 and had no definitive proposals for further sequels. Even so, Sony recruited screenwriter James Vanderbilt to write scripts for a fourth, fifth, and sixth Spider-Man film in October 2007 and August 2009 after initial reports claimed the studio was negotiating with Koepp.

The Spider-Man 4 script was rewritten by David Lindsay-Abaire and Gary Ross in November 2008 and October 2009. Raimi had been unhappy with Spider-Man 3 and wanted to create a satisfying narrative to conclude the franchise, but found himself at odds with Sony because he was unable to rectify problems in the story within the allotted time. The problems were such that the release was postponed several times to accommodate changes in the writing. Ultimately, Raimi withdrew as Spider-Man 4 director, prompting Sony to cancel the film in January 2010 and begin development of a reboot. The media has since publicized information about plot, characters, and casting from interviews conducted with filmmakers involved in the project. (Note: Attributed to multiple sources:)

== Marc Webb films ==
=== The Amazing Spider-Man (2012) ===
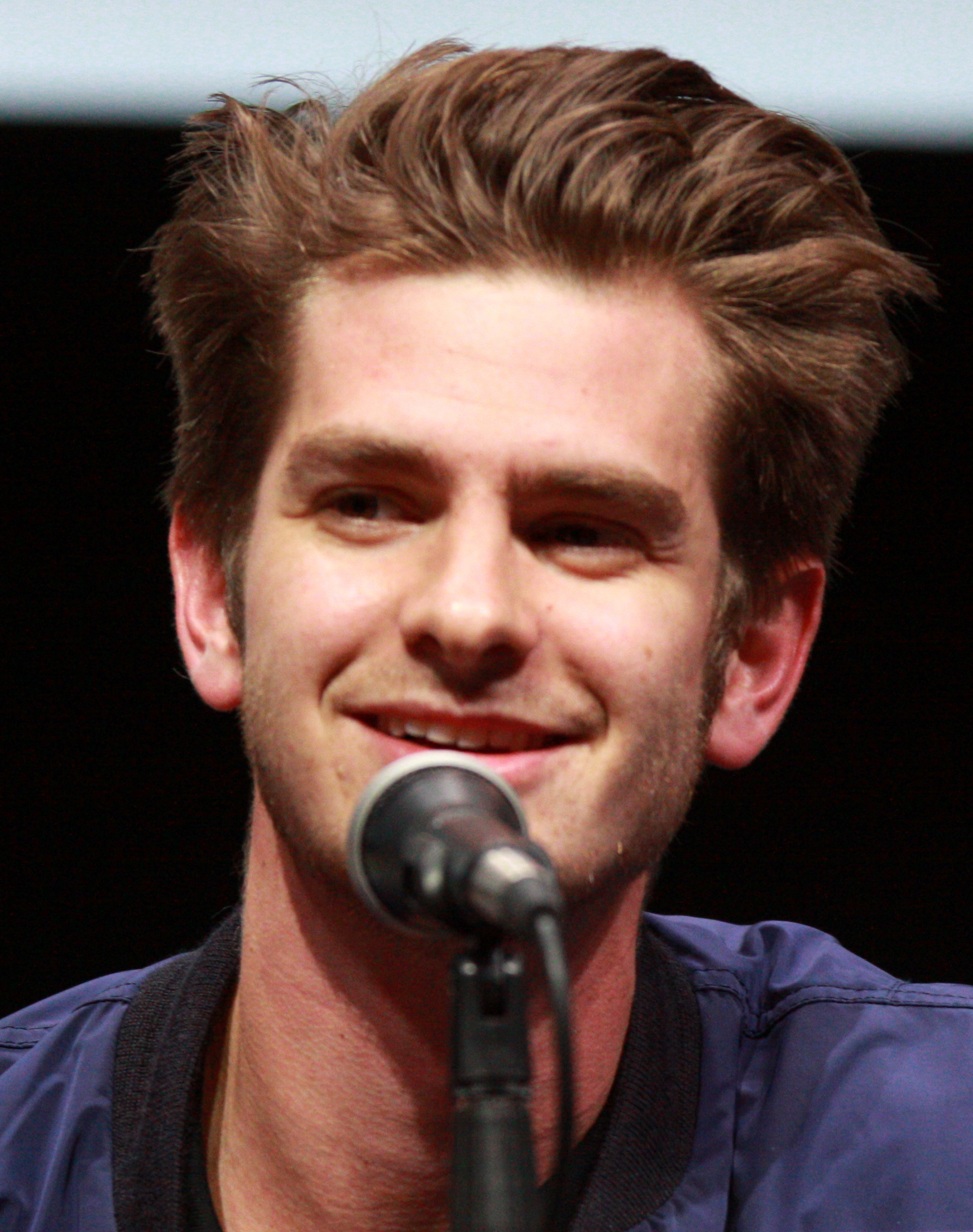
Andrew Garfield in 2013

Columbia committed to a Spider-Man reboot with Marvel Studios, envisioning an origin story that would showcase Peter's civilian life. They hired Marc Webb as director from a shortlist of filmmakers including David Fincher and Wes Anderson. Sargent, Vanderbilt, and Steve Kloves produced the finished script. Casting reflected specifications for mostly unknown actors. Andrew Garfield joined as Peter Parker in July 2010, signing a three-picture deal with a starting salary of $500,000. Webb said he was convinced by Garfield's screen test of a cutscene eating a burger.

The filmmakers felt it was important Peter's perception as an outcast be adapted to a modern context. The Amazing Spider-Man features Peter confronting the Lizard, the monstrous form of Curt Connors (Rhys Ifans), an Oscorp scientist who previously had a partnership with Peter's deceased father. It was shot from December 2010 to April 2011, and was released in the United States in July 2012. The Amazing Spider-Man finished as the seventh highest-grossing film of 2012, amassing $758 million at the box office.

=== The Amazing Spider-Man 2 (2014) ===
Webb and Garfield were confirmed in the press to be returning for The Amazing Spider-Man 2 in September 2012. Vanderbilt was brought back to outline a draft, while scriptwriting responsibilities were assigned to Jeff Pinkner, Roberto Orci and Alex Kurtzman. Filmmakers redesigned the Spider-Man costume to more closely resemble both comic book suits and the suit in the Raimi films. The Amazing Spider-Man 2 depicts Peter's quest to protect Gwen Stacy (Emma Stone), resulting in battles with the electricity-manipulating Electro (Jamie Foxx) and a vengeful Harry Osborn (Dane DeHaan). Filming lasted about 100 days, followed by the theatrical rollout in May 2014. The Amazing Spider-Man 2, while profitable, failed to replicate the success of The Amazing Spider-Man.

=== Cancellation ===
Franchise logo from 2012 to 2014

The Amazing Spider-Man's success spawned immediate discussion of an expanded Spider-Man film universe. Sony commissioned a third and fourth sequel for releases in 2016 and 2018; they secured Webb's commitment as director only for the former. Eventually, a number of spinoff projects took precedence, owing to the relative failure of The Amazing Spider-Man 2, and sequel development collapsed when Sony entered a new licensing agreement with Marvel and parent company Walt Disney Studios.

== Marvel Cinematic Universe ==
=== Licensing agreement with Marvel Studios ===
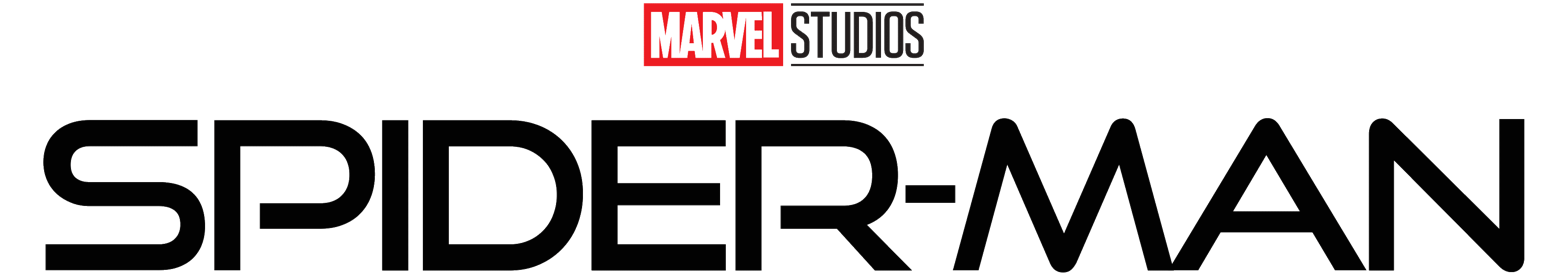
Franchise logo from 2017 to 2021

Marvel had been seeking to incorporate Spider-Man into their multimedia franchise, the Marvel Cinematic Universe (MCU), as early as 2014. By this point, they were pursuing control of the film rights thanks to their recent box office success. Studio president Kevin Feige suggested retroactively integrating The Amazing Spider-Man franchise into the MCU to Amy Pascal, then-Sony co-chairman, to improve the prospects of associated films. At the same time, Pascal and producer Avi Arad had attempted to establish continuity by authorizing use of the design of The Amazing Spider-Man's Oscorp Tower for The Avengers (2012), but the approval process occurred too late into the production of The Avengers. Another idea brought forward was a crossover film combining The Amazing Spider-Man universe with that of the Raimi trilogy.

In December 2014, an anonymous group hacked Sony's computer networks and leaked confidential information, among them emails of discussions between Sony and Marvel pertaining to the licensing of Spider-Man for the MCU film Captain America: Civil War (2016). Negotiations over the copyrights stalled until Disney and Sony brokered an agreement in February 2015. It reinstated the conditions of their preexisting arrangement, with a clause that entitled Marvel the right to reduce their annual royalty payments to Sony based on the performance of their films. Conversely, Sony retained full creative control of the MCU Spider-Man films.

The studios once more renegotiated in 2019, briefly resulting in the dissolution of their partnership. Sony sought to maintain their original agreement, which conferred merchandising rights and 5% of first-dollar gross to Disney. On the other hand, Disney demanded that future Spider-Man films produced by Feige be funded equally in a cooperative venture, increasing their share of profits. Negotiations resumed after public backlash, and the studios reached a new deal that September, the terms of which guaranteed a third Spider-Man film and a related MCU project.

=== Title roles ===
==== Spider-Man: Homecoming (2017) ====
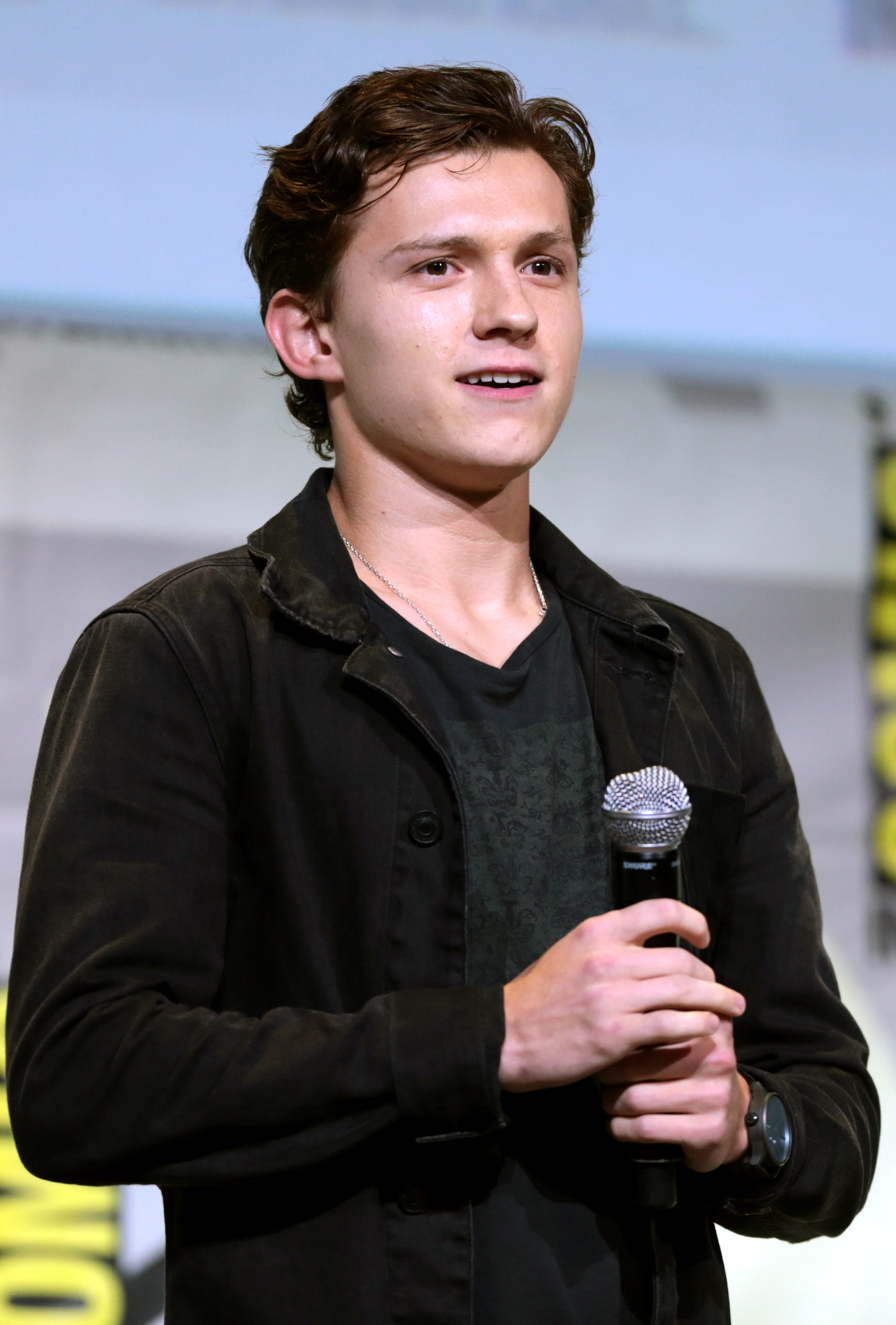
Tom Holland in 2016

Work on an MCU Spider-Man production began in February 2015. Ted Melfi, Jonathan Levine, and Jon Watts were among the filmmakers executives considered to direct Spider-Man: Homecoming, with Watts ultimately signed as director in June 2015. Watts came to Marvel's attention for his work in the independent thriller Cop Car (2015). The studios hired a succession of writers to produce the script for Homecoming.

Some 1,500 actors were scouted for the role of Peter Parker / Spider-Man. Six of the actors auditioned in screen tests with Robert Downey Jr. in character as Iron Man / Tony Stark, which the producers viewed to observe their onscreen chemistry. The filmmakers held further auditions when Tom Holland and Charlie Rowe were picked as the finalists. Holland was cast as Peter in June 2015, signing a six-picture deal to appear in three Spider-Man films and three other MCU films. Homecoming details Peter's transformation into Spider-Man, in what the filmmakers described as a coming-of-age story. Shooting took place from June to October 2016, and the film was released in July 2017.

==== Spider-Man: Far From Home (2019) ====
Studio executives were already contemplating sequels to Homecoming before the original film's release. The filmmakers developed Spider-Man: Far From Home as the final film of the third phase of the MCU's Infinity Saga. Watts and screenwriters Chris McKenna and Erik Sommers were confirmed to be returning for the film in mid 2017. Watts was especially interested in resolving the narratives about the Spider-Man characters from Avengers: Endgame (2019) because they received an ambiguous resolution. In Far From Home, Nick Fury (Samuel L. Jackson) recruits Peter to help Mysterio (Jake Gyllenhaal) defeat the Elementals. Filming occurred from July to October 2018, and the theatrical release was scheduled in July 2019. Far From Home became the first Spider-Man film to gross $1 billion at the box office.

==== Spider-Man: No Way Home (2021) ====
A third entry in the MCU Spider-Man franchise began development shortly after Sony and Marvel's contract was effective. Watts continued his duties as director, while McKenna and Sommers returned to write the screenplay of what would become Spider-Man: No Way Home. The writers conceived a multiverse story from an idea inspired by the fantasy drama It's a Wonderful Life (1946), wherein Peter convinces Dr. Stephen Strange (Benedict Cumberbatch) to reverse the events leading to the exposure of his identity as Spider-Man with a spell. The film connects Sony's Spider-Man universes to the MCU and features several of the associated characters, including Maguire and Garfield's Spider-Men. No Way Home's production lasted from October 2020 to March 2021, and the film debuted in theaters in December 2021. By the end of the global rollout, it became the highest-grossing film of 2021 with a box office take of $1.910 billion. (Note: Excludes grosses from subsequent re-releases.)

==== Spider-Man: Brand New Day (2026) ====
Pascal announced work on a second trilogy of MCU Spider-Man films in 2021. Although No Way Home had been Holland's final contracted standalone film as Spider-Man, the actor was confirmed to be reprising the role for Spider-Man: Brand New Day in 2024. The film was directed by Destin Daniel Cretton. Principal photography was postponed to accommodate Holland's simultaneous commitments to Avengers: Doomsday and the Christopher Nolan-directed film The Odyssey (both 2026). Brand New Day's main story shows Peter adjusting to life in isolation and a set of grief-induced physiological changes that enhance his spider senses. Following its July 2026 debut, the Rotten Tomatoes consensus noted that the film "is a promising reset that portends Spidey will remain sticky on the big screen for years to come." Brand New Day broke multiple box office records and, at $2.517 billion as of October 2026, represents the highest-grossing film of the year.

=== Ensemble roles ===
Captain America: Civil War marked Spider-Man's first appearance in the MCU. Filmmaking duo Anthony and Joe Russo directed Civil War, and they campaigned intensively to reintroduce the character in the film. Production for Civil War commenced in 2015, lasting four months.

Marvel produced two Avengers films featuring Holland as Spider-Man: Avengers: Infinity War (2018) and Avengers: Endgame (2019). Infinity War and Endgame were initially conceptualized as a two-part film, but the studios later split the project into two distinct films that they shot concurrently in 2017.

== Animated Spider-Verse ==
=== Spider-Man: Into the Spider-Verse (2018) ===
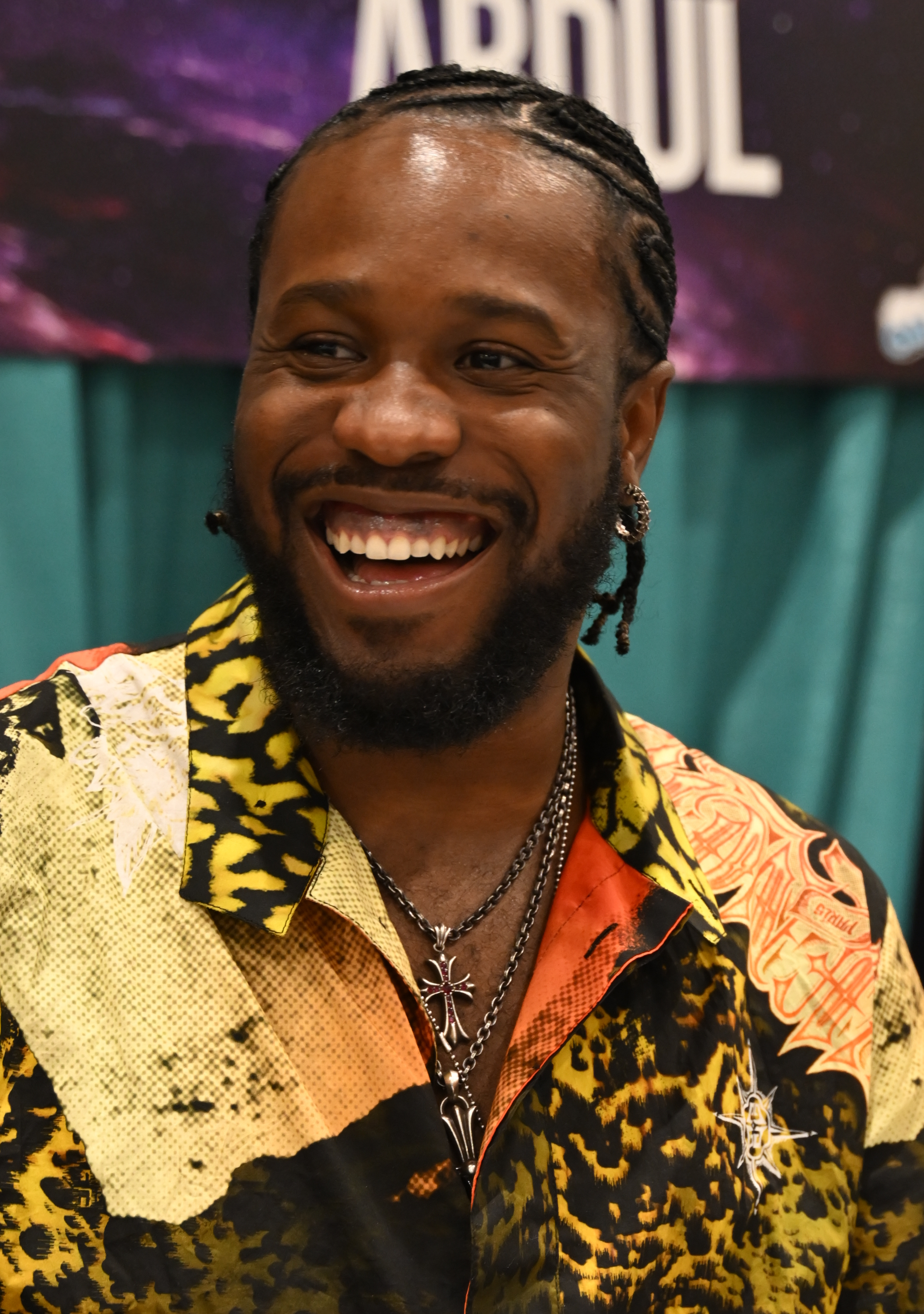
Shameik Moore in 2023

Based off the failure of The Amazing Spider-Man 2, Sony began planning spinoffs to rehabilitate the franchise, including an animated film. Pascal approached, then hired, the filmmakers Phil Lord and Christopher Miller for a co-production. Their concept gleans from the "Spider-Verse" story arc of The Amazing Spider-Man comics, featuring Miles Morales, an alternate incarnation of Spider-Man from Marvel's Ultimate Comics imprint, as the main protagonist.

Lord and Rodney Rothman prepared the Spider-Man: Into the Spider-Verse script, and the responsibility for directing was split between Rothman, Bob Persichetti, and Peter Ramsey. Actor Shameik Moore stars as Miles, which was announced in the media in April 2017. Jake Johnson, John Mulaney, Nicolas Cage, and Chris Pine voice Spider-Men from alternate universes. The Spider-Verse timeline exists independently from the live-action Spider-Man films. After its December 2018 release, Into the Spider-Verse became the first non-Disney film to win the Academy Award for Best Animated Feature in seven years.

=== Spider-Man: Across the Spider-Verse (2023) ===
Studio discussions for a sequel, Spider-Man: Across the Spider-Verse, preceded the release of Into the Spider-Verse. Across the Spider-Verse originated from a planned two-part film that was revised once the filmmakers developed the story to indicate a separate follow-up film. Lord and Miller returned to undertake the scriptwriting with David Callaham, based on a plot depicting a romance between Miles and Gwen Stacy / Spider-Woman (Hailee Steinfeld). Sony engaged Joaquim Dos Santos, Kemp Powers and Justin K. Thompson to direct Across the Spider-Verse. The film is distinguished with an expanded cast of Spider-People, led by Johnson, Oscar Isaac, Issa Rae, Daniel Kaluuya, and Karan Soni. Production was mired in labor disputes. After a delay in the release schedule, Across the Spider-Verse opened to theaters in June 2023, finishing the year as the sixth highest-grossing film with $690.9 million. As well, the film was a candidate for Best Animated Feature at the 96th Academy Awards.

=== Spider-Man: Beyond the Spider-Verse (2027) ===
Creation of Spider-Man: Beyond the Spider-Verse coincided with Across the Spider-Verse. Sony originally scheduled a March 29, 2024 release date for Beyond the Spider-Verse, but postponed the film indefinitely in the wake of the 2023 SAG-AFTRA strike. The studio plans to release the film on June 18, 2027.

=== Spin-offs ===
Due to the success of the Spider-Verse, development is ongoing on spinoffs that explore the mythology of Spider-Man. The completed projects take the form of short films. The first, Spider-Ham: Caught in a Ham, was released in tandem with Into the Spider-Verse's digital launch on February 26, 2019, featuring Mulaney reprising his role as Spider-Ham. On the other hand, The Spider Within: A Spider-Verse Story premiered at the Annecy International Animation Film Festival in France in June 2023 and later on YouTube in March 2024. A Spider-Verse Story depicts Miles undergoing a panic attack induced by stress in his personal life.

Among the upcoming projects are a Spider-Women spinoff and a Spider-Punk adaptation. Kaluuya is writing the script for the Spider-Punk film with Ajon Singh. The premise of the Spider-Women spinoff will be a Gwen-centric narrative introducing Cindy Moon / Silk and Jessica Drew / Spider-Woman onscreen. In May 2023, reports emerged that Sony was contemplating a live-action Miles Morales film, which would take priority after the releases of Brand New Day and Beyond the Spider-Verse.

== Sony's Spider-Man Universe ==
Since 2018, Sony has distributed a series of live-action films based on secondary characters of the Spider-Man canon, part of a broader multimedia project dubbed Sony's Spider-Man Universe (SSU). The franchise's first entry is Venom (2018), itself comprising a trilogy with Venom: Let There Be Carnage (2021) and Venom: The Last Dance (2024). Three other titles complete the SSU: Morbius (2022), Madame Web, and Kraven the Hunter (both 2024). Sony ceased their output of films indefinitely after the box office failures of Madame Web and Kraven the Hunter. The SSU operates with a loosely shared continuity to all existing Spider-Man film franchises but does not explicitly feature the character beyond the depiction of Peter's birth in Madame Web. (Note: Attributed to multiple sources:)

== Amateur works ==
Amateur films about Spider-Man examine a range of interpretations of the character from ordinary people. Donald F. Glut produced the earliest known Spider-Man fan film in 1969, featuring the character battling in a California state park. It was Glut's final amateur film before pursuing an acting career. Spider-Man Versus Kraven the Hunter (1974) was director Bruce Cardozo's student project for his studies at New York University's Tisch School of the Arts. Lee, impressed by the film's scope, permitted its noncommercial exhibition, but refused Cardozo's proposals for a theatrical release because they did not share the same vision for a feature film. Spider-Man Versus Kraven the Hunter chronicles Kraven the Hunter's pursuit to kill Spider-Man in a conspiracy devised by Daily Bugle publisher J. Jonah Jameson. The film has seldom been shown since its release. James Krieg's Viva Spider-Man (1989) attempts to reimagine the first animated TV adaptation of Spider-Man.

In 1992, Dan Poole developed The Green Goblin's Last Stand as an adaptation of The Amazing Spider-Man's "The Night Gwen Stacy Died" storyline. Poole financed the film's $400 budget with wages from his job as a mail clerk at the National Aquarium in Baltimore. He also performed most of the stunt work in The Green Goblin's Last Stand, including a simulated web slinging sequence that was recorded at an unoccupied office building. Other unauthorized depictions of Spider-Man include the Turkish exploitation film 3 Dev Adam (lit. '3 Giant Men', 1973), featuring the character as the mastermind of a counterfeiting scheme, and Dariya Dil (1988).

Production of amateur Spider-Man films has continued into the twenty-first century. Italian Spiderman (2007), a short film released in snippets on YouTube, parodies Italian adventure films of the mid-twentieth century, though it bears little resemblance to the American comics. Spider-Man: Lotus (2023) depicts a story partially shaped by director Gavin J. Konop's struggles as a high school student. Konop crowdfunded $112,000 for the budget through Indiegogo and released the film in August 2023. Lotus was derided by fans, and leaked texts of racist comments sent by Konop and lead actor Warden Wayne drew widespread coverage in the media.

== Cast ==
List indicators

This section includes characters who will appear or have appeared in multiple "franchises" of Spider-Man films.

- An empty grey cell indicates the character was not in the film, or that the character's official presence has not yet been confirmed.
- ^{A} indicates an appearance through archival footage or audio.
- ^{C} indicates a cameo role.
- ^{E} indicates an appearance not included in the theatrical cut.
- ^{U} indicates an uncredited appearance.
- ^{Y} indicates a younger version of the character.

Character	Television films (1977–1981)	Spider-Man trilogy (2002–2007)	The Amazing Spider-Man films (2012–2014)	Marvel Cinematic Universe (2016–present)	Sony's Spider-Man Universe (2018–2024)	Spider-Verse films (2018–present)
Peter Parker Spider-Man	Nicholas Hammond	Tobey Maguire	Andrew Garfield Max Charles^{Y}	Tom Holland Max Favreau^{U}^{Y} Tobey Maguire (Note: Portrays the same version of the character from the Spider-Man original trilogy in Spider-Man: No Way Home (2021).) Andrew Garfield (Note: Portrays the same version of the character from The Amazing Spider-Man films in Spider-Man: No Way Home (2021).)	Tom Holland^{A}^{U} Uncredited infant^{U}	Jake Johnson Various (Note: Including: Chris Pine; Nicolas Cage as Spider-Man Noir; Jorma Taccone as Earth-67 Spider-Man; Josh Keaton as Spider-Man from The Spectacular Spider-Man; Yuri Lowenthal as Insomniac Games' Spider-Man; Jack Quaid as Earth-65 Peter Parker / Lizard) Tobey Maguire^{A} Andrew Garfield^{A}
May Parker	Jeff Donnell	Rosemary Harris	Sally Field	Marisa Tomei		Lily Tomlin Elizabeth Perkins
J. Jonah Jameson	David White Robert F. Simon	J. K. Simmons		J. K. Simmons (Note: Despite being portrayed by the same actor from the Spider-Man original trilogy, this is a different version of the character belonging to the Marvel Cinematic Universe.)	J. K. Simmons^{U}	Adam Brown^{U} J. K. Simmons (Note: Simmons voices different versions of the character.)
Robbie Robertson	Hilly Hicks	Bill Nunn				
Glory Grant	Chip Fields (Note: This character based on Grant is named Rita Conway.)					Ayo Edebiri
Mary Jane Watson		Kirsten Dunst	Shailene Woodley^{U} (Note: Appears briefly, albeit a single shot from behind. Woodley filmed additional scenes for The Amazing Spider-Man 2 (2014) but was ultimately removed from the final cut.)			Zoë Kravitz Melissa Sturm
Norman Osborn		Willem Dafoe (Note: This version of the character uses the alias of the Green Goblin.)	Chris Cooper	Willem Dafoe		Jorma Taccone
Ben Parker		Cliff Robertson	Martin Sheen		Adam Scott	Cliff Robertson^{A} Martin Sheen^{A}
Harry Osborn		James Franco (Note: Despite his alter ego being marketed and noted on the credits as the New Goblin in Spider-Man 3 (2007), the character never uses such an alias in the film.)	Dane DeHaan			
Flash Thompson		Joe Manganiello	Chris Zylka	Tony Revolori		
Burglar		Michael Papajohn (Note: This version is named Dennis Carradine.)	Leif Gantvoort			
Betty Brant		Elizabeth Banks		Angourie Rice		Antonia Lentini
Liz Allan		Sally Livingstone		Laura Harrier		
Doctor Octopus		Alfred Molina (Note: This version of the character is Otto Octavius as adapted from the source material.)		Alfred Molina		Kathryn Hahn (Note: This version of the character is female and named Olivia Octavius.) Alfred Molina^{A}
Curt Connors		Dylan Baker	Rhys Ifans (Note: This version of the character becomes the Lizard.)	Rhys Ifans		Appeared
John Jameson		Daniel Gillies			Chris O'Hara^{C}	
Flint Marko Sandman		Thomas Haden Church		Thomas Haden Church		
Eddie Brock Venom		Topher Grace		Tom Hardy^{U}	Tom Hardy	
Gwen Stacy		Bryce Dallas Howard (Note: Additionally, a student in Peter Parker's university class in Spider-Man 2 (2004), portrayed by Brianna Brown, is identified as Gwen Stacy in the film's novelization.)	Emma Stone			Hailee Steinfeld (Note: This version of the character is known as Spider-Woman.)
George Stacy		James Cromwell	Denis Leary			Shea Whigham Denis Leary^{A}
Mary Parker			Embeth Davidtz		Emma Roberts	
Sally Avril			Kelsey Chow	Isabella Amara		
Max Dillon Electro			Jamie Foxx	Jamie Foxx		
Aleksei Sytsevich Rhino			Paul Giamatti		Alessandro Nivola	Appeared
Adrian Toomes Vulture				Michael Keaton	Michael Keaton	Jorma Taccone (Note: This version of the character is named Adriano Toomino.)
Aaron Davis				Donald Glover	Appeared^{A} (Note: Silent footage of the Spider-Verse version.)	Mahershala Ali (Note: This version of the character uses the alias of Prowler.) Donald Glover
Mac Gargan Scorpion				Michael Mando		Joaquín Cosío (Note: This version of the character uses the alias of Scorpion.)
Tombstone				Marvin Jones III		Marvin Jones III
Dmitri				Numan Acar	Fred Hechinger Billy Barratt^{Y}	
Mrs. Chen					Peggy Lu	Peggy Lu

== Home media ==
Title	Format	Release date	Ref.
Spider-Man	VHS, DVD	November 5, 2002	
Spider-Man	Blu-ray	October 30, 2007	
Spider-Man 2	VHS, DVD	November 30, 2004	
Spider-Man 2	Blu-ray	October 30, 2007	
Spider-Man 3	DVD, Blu-ray	October 30, 2007	
The Amazing Spider-Man (2012)	DVD, Blu-ray, Blu-ray 3D	November 9, 2012	
The Amazing Spider-Man 2	DVD, Blu-ray, Blu-ray 3D	August 19, 2014	
The Amazing Spider-Man 2	UHD	March 1, 2016	
Spider-Man: Homecoming	DVD, Blu-ray, Blu-ray 3D, UHD	October 17, 2017	
Spider-Man: Into the Spider-Verse	DVD, Blu-ray, UHD	March 19, 2019	
Spider-Man: Far From Home	DVD, Blu-ray, UHD	October 1, 2019	
Spider-Man: No Way Home	DVD, Blu-ray, UHD	April 12, 2022	
Spider-Man: Across the Spider-Verse	DVD, Blu-ray, UHD	September 5, 2023	

=== Theatrical re-releases ===
In March 2024, Sony spearheaded a re-release campaign of the live-action Spider-Man films to commemorate Columbia's centennial anniversary. They commenced the theatrical rollout with the Raimi trilogy in April, followed by The Amazing Spider-Man films in mid-May, before concluding with the MCU trilogy in multiple weekends from late May to early June. Sony again screened the Raimi trilogy in a two-weekend release campaign in late 2025, part of a joint venture with Fathom Events.

== Reception ==
=== Box office ===
Film	Year	Box office gross revenue			All time rank		Budget	Ref
Film	Year	US & Canada	Overseas	Worldwide	NA	WW	Budget	Ref
1977 film
Spider-Man	1977	—	$9,000,000	$9,000,000	—	—	—	
Sam Raimi trilogy
Spider-Man	2002	$407,774,549	$418,020,347	$825,820,266	35	82	$139 million	
Spider-Man 2	2004	$374,337,514	$410,198,687	$784,561,571	46	95	$200 million	
Spider-Man 3	2007	$337,281,992	$554,359,494	$891,697,618	60	64	$258 million	
Marc Webb films
The Amazing Spider-Man	2012	$262,782,352	$495,918,171	$758,725,893	115	104	$230 million	
The Amazing Spider-Man 2	2014	$203,605,622	$513,278,887	$716,934,779	208	121	$250 million	
Marvel Cinematic Universe
Spider-Man: Homecoming	2017	$334,952,829	$545,983,955	$880,978,185	64	68	$175 million	
Spider-Man: Far From Home	2019	$391,283,774	$741,414,082	$1,132,723,226	40	25	$160 million	
Spider-Man: No Way Home	2021	$814,866,759	$1,106,533,944	$1,921,426,073	4	9	$200 million	
Spider-Man: Brand New Day	2026	$959,006,311	$1,562,270,576	$2,521,276,887	1	3	$225 million	
Animated Spider-Verse
Spider-Man: Into the Spider-Verse	2018	$190,241,310	$203,361,125	$393,602,435	232	335	$90 million	
Spider-Man: Across the Spider-Verse	2023	$381,593,754	$309,230,984	$690,824,738	50	147	$100 million	
Total		$4,657,726,766	$6,869,570,252	$11,527,571,671	3	2	$1.927 billion	

Film	Year	Box office ticket sales (est.)		
Film	Year	United States and Canada	Other territories	Worldwide
Sam Raimi trilogy
Spider-Man	2002	71,706,653	55,953,964 (Note: Spider-Man: Austria, Belgium, Bulgaria, Cyprus, Czech Republic, Denmark, Estonia, Finland, Germany, Hungary, Iceland, Ireland, Italy, Latvia, Lithuania, Luxembourg, Netherlands, Norway, Poland, Romania, Slovakia, Spain, Sweden, Switzerland, Turkey – 20,950,903; Brazil and France – 14,965,620; Argentina, Australia, Japan – 10,161,873; United Kingdom – 6,700,000; China – 2,050,000; Seoul City (South Korea) – 1,125,568)	127,660,617
Spider-Man 2	2004	61,498,313	44,433,890 (Note: Spider-Man 2: Brazil, Japan, Norway – 12,869,224; Austria, Belgium, Bulgaria, Czech Republic, Denmark, Estonia, Finland, Hungary, Iceland, Ireland, Latvia, Luxembourg, Netherlands, Poland, Portugal, Romania, Slovakia, Slovenia, Spain, Sweden, Switzerland, Turkey, United Kingdom – 8,351,195; France and Italy – 8,948,733; United Kingdom – 6,000,000; Germany – 3,291,034; China – 2,606,000; South Korea – 2,367,704)	105,932,203
Spider-Man 3	2007	49,767,512	61,958,357 (Note: Spider-Man 3: Brazil, China, Japan, Russia, South Korea, Ukraine – 24,387,326; India – 10,000,000; France and Italy – 9,576,880; Austria, Belgium, Czech Republic, Denmark, Estonia, Finland, Hungary, Iceland, Ireland, Latvia, Netherlands, Norway, Poland, Portugal, Romania, Slovakia, Slovenia, Spain, Sweden, Switzerland, Turkey – 8,089,563; United Kingdom – 6,700,000; Germany – 3,204,588)	220,400,000
Marc Webb films
The Amazing Spider-Man	2012	33,677,900	45,793,395 (Note: The Amazing Spider-Man: Argentina, Brazil, China, Japan, Mexico, Russia, South Korea – 31,377,180; Europe (excluding Russia) – 14,416,215)	89,200,000
The Amazing Spider-Man 2	2014	24,800,000	38,363,616 (Note: The Amazing Spider-Man 2: Argentina, Brazil, China, Mexico, South Korea – 23,372,211; Europe and Morocco – 14,991,405)	77,100,000
Marvel Cinematic Universe
Spider-Man: Homecoming	2017	37,418,200	69,308,310 (Note: Spider-Man: Homecoming: China – 21,891,581; Mexico – 9,846,562; Chile, South Korea, Venezuela – 8,872,619; Austria, Belgium, Bosnia and Herzegovina, Bulgaria, Croatia, Cyprus, Czech Republic, Denmark, Estonia, Finland, France, Germany, Greece, Hungary, Iceland, Ireland, Italy, Latvia, Lithuania, Luxembourg, Morocco, Netherlands, North Macedonia, Poland, Portugal, Romania, Slovakia, Slovenia, Sweden, Turkey – 8,706,778; Brazil – 6,715,848; United Kingdom – 4,100,000; Russia – 4,050,314; Japan – 1,930,000; Spain – 1,768,971; Argentina – 1,118,453; Norway – 192,088; Switzerland – 115,096)	172,200,000
Spider-Man: Far From Home	2019	43,340,300	99,045,272 (Note: Spider-Man: Far From Home: China – 39,380,000; Austria, Belgium, Bosnia and Herzegovina, Bulgaria, Croatia, Cyprus, Czech Republic, Denmark, Estonia, Finland, France, Germany, Greece, Hungary, Iceland, Ireland, Italy, Latvia, Lithuania, Luxembourg, Montenegro, Netherlands, North Macedonia, Norway, Poland, Portugal, Slovenia – 11,671,076; Mexico – 10,810,870; South Korea – 8,023,606; Brazil – 6,562,228; Russia – 5,646,679; United Kingdom – 5,300,000; Spain – 2,305,169; Japan – 2,100,000; India – 1,856,875; Argentina – 1,285,785; Turkey – 942,651; Ukraine – 747,063; Romania – 249,505; Switzerland – 171,621; Slovakia – 135,269)	174,100,000
Spider-Man: No Way Home	2021	89,000,000	156,507,359 (Note: Spider-Man: No Way Home: Argentina, Australia, Brazil, Chile, Colombia, Croatia, Greece, Indonesia, Mexico, Netherlands, New Zealand, Poland, Romania, Russia, Saudi Arabia, Serbia, South Korea, Spain, Sweden, Switzerland, Turkey, Ukraine, United Arab Emirates, United Kingdom, Venezuela – 116,426,930; India – 11,000,000; France – 7,387,844; Austria, Belgium, Bosnia and Herzegovina, Bulgaria, Cyprus, Czech Republic, Denmark, Estonia, Finland, Hungary, Iceland, Ireland, Latvia, Lithuania, Luxembourg, Montenegro, North Macedonia, Norway, Portugal, Slovakia, Slovenia – 6,817,614; Germany – 4,671,011; Bolivia, Paraguay, Peru – 3,972,621; Italy – 3,411,339; Japan – 2,820,000)	311,500,000
Spider-Man: Brand New Day	2026	84,800,000	253,400,000	338,200,000
Animated Spider-Verse
Spider-Man: Into the Spider-Verse	2018	21,093,500	24,781,469 (Note: Spider-Man: Into the Spider-Verse: China – 11,763,454; United Kingdom – 1,400,000; Other European countries – 5,183,984; Mexico – 3,345,000; Brazil – 2,059,756; South Korea – 724,394; Argentina – 304,881)	72,800,000
Spider-Man: Across the Spider-Verse	2023	35,400,000	63,300,000	98,700,000
Total		552,502,378	912,845,632	1,787,792,820

=== Critical and public response ===
Film	Critical		Public
Film	Rotten Tomatoes	Metacritic	CinemaScore
Spider-Man	90% (249 reviews)	73 (38 reviews)	A−
Spider-Man 2	93% (276 reviews)	83 (41 reviews)	A−
Spider-Man 3	62% (261 reviews)	59 (40 reviews)	B+
The Amazing Spider-Man	71% (339 reviews)	66 (42 reviews)	A−
The Amazing Spider-Man 2	50% (313 reviews)	53 (50 reviews)	B+
Spider-Man: Homecoming	92% (396 reviews)	73 (51 reviews)	A
Spider-Man: Into the Spider-Verse	97% (399 reviews)	87 (50 reviews)	A+
Spider-Man: Far From Home	91% (454 reviews)	69 (55 reviews)	A
Spider-Man: No Way Home	93% (430 reviews)	71 (60 reviews)	A+
Spider-Man: Across the Spider-Verse	95% (399 reviews)	86 (60 reviews)	A
Spider-Man: Brand New Day	90% (440 reviews)	66 (56 reviews)	A

== See also ==
- List of accolades received by the 2002–2007 Spider-Man film series
- List of films based on Marvel Comics publications
- Spider-Man in television
- The Spider-Man of Sudan, a 2022 documentary film about a Sudanese protester dressed as Spider-Man
- 3 Dev Adam ("Three Giant Men"), 1973 Turkish film featuring an unauthorized depiction of Spider-Man
