= The Trials of Darksmoke =

- Directed by: John F. Carroll; Russell Minton
- Written by: Screenplay: John F. Carroll
- Produced by: John F. Carroll; Russell Minton
- Starring: John F. Carroll; Andrew Brett; David McCullars
- Cinematography: Greg DeBlieux; Russell Minton; John F. Carroll
- Edited by: John F. Carroll
- Music by: Christopher Barr
- Production companies: Demented Features, KRD Media Group, Weird City Films
- Release date: August 2013
- Country: United States
- Language: English

The Trials of Darksmoke is a 2013 fantasy-adventure fan film based upon Mattel's Masters of the Universe franchise. It is the third and final film in a trilogy that includes The Wizard of Stone Mountain and The Fountain of Life. The film was directed by John F. Carroll during the Winter and Spring of 2012 around Austin, Texas and the Texas Hill Country.

The film ties together several plots that have run throughout the trilogy. The Wizard, Malik, He-Man, She-Ra and their friends journey throughout Eternia attempting to stop the evil Skeletor. The film was set to debut at Grayskull Con 2013 in Germany in September 2013, followed by Screenings at Power-Con 2013 in Los Angeles and the Alamo Drafthouse in Austin, Texas.

== Plot ==
Skeletor has released a demonic power to conquer Castle Grayskull and the rest of the universe! He-Man and She-Ra work to stop Skeletor while the wizard Malik claims an ancient power bestowed by the dragon Granamyr. But will the cost be too great?

== Cast ==
- John F. Carroll as Malik
- David McCullars as He-Man
- Chris Romani as Evil-Lyn
- Javier Smith as Keldor, Zodak
- Bethany Harbaugh as Teela
- Bridget Farias as Kareen
- Richard Dodwell as Kyros
- Joseph Fotinos as King Randor
- Bob Swaffar as King Miro
- Emily Hampton as Princess Adora, She-Ra
- Parker Danks as Chad
- Robert Berry as Grandfather
- Juli Dearrington as The Sorceress
- Andrew Brett as Skeletor
- Elisabeth Raine as Rayna
- Laura Cannon as Myrna
- Ben Scott as Man-At-Arms
- Taylor Basinger as Giaus
- Björn Korthof as Prince Adam
- Johnny Bilson as Tri-Klops
- Peggy Schott as Queen Angella
- Briony Zakes as Frosta
- Lee Wilson as King Grayskull
- Darwin Miller as Eldor
- Kenneth C. Liverman as King Ragnar
- Dean Stefan as Elder in Council of Elders
- Dan Eardley as Elder in Council of Elders
- Danielle Gelehrter as Elder in Council of Elders
- Rob Lamb as Elder in Council of Elders
- Jukka Issakainen as Elder in Council of Elders
- Jon Kallis as Elder in Council of Elders
- Joshua Van Pelt as Elder in Council of Elders
- James Eatock as Elder in Council of Elders

== Production ==
The Trials of Darksmoke and The Fountain of Life were shot simultaneously during the winter and spring of 2012. With pick-up shots scheduled for Winter 2013. The films were shot digitally, using two DSLR cameras—A Canon T2i and a Nikon D7000. A riverbed in Walnut Creek Park, a location that had been used in the previous films in the series, collapsed after a rainstorm in April 2012 and was repurposed for other set locations.

== Sequels ==
The Trials of Darksmoke is part of a trilogy that includes The Wizard of Stone Mountain and The Fountain of Life. The Trials of Darksmoke is the third and final film in the trilogy.
