= Viva Spider-Man =

- Screen card for the film.
- Directed by: James Krieg
- Written by: Comic Book: Stan Lee; Steve Ditko
- Produced by: Stuart Burkin
- Starring: Captain Haggerty; Greg Spence; Mark Fitzgerald; Sven Davison; Jeremy Rogers; Jack Douglass; Bob Tull
- Cinematography: Victoria Ford
- Edited by: James Krieg
- Music by: Cutis Stigers
- Production company: Swing City Films
- Distributed by: Swing City Films
- Release date: 1980
- Running time: 13:04
- Country: United States
- Language: English

Viva Spider-Man is a student film and Spider-Man fan film created in 1980 based on the animated series Spider-Man from 1967. It is based on the episodes "King Pinned" and "Criminals in the Clouds". The film's creator, Jim Kreig would later go on to be a writer for Spider-Man: The Animated Series.

== Plot ==
The film begins in a diner where Peter Parker and a female friend, Susan, are talking. Susan sees a basketball player from their high school, Roy Robinson, whom she says she likes. Peter gets upset at this and starts saying bad things about him, and Susan storms off. Peter begins to daydream about by Susan, and becoming better than Robinson. He decides to go to his gym coach to get on the school basketball team to impress to Susan, figuring his secret spider-like powers will make him a star player, but the coach refuses to give him a tryout, saying the team roster is full but offering Peter the role of waterboy.

Later that night, two criminals break into Robinson’s house and kidnap him while he sleeps. Meanwhile, at the Daily Bugle, Peter overhears a conversation between J. Jonah Jameson and Wilson Fisk (Kingpin) in which he tells Jameson to come to him; Peter dons his Spider-Man suit and swings to the Kingpin's office.

Kingpin threatens Jameson that if he does not retract what he writes in his papers, Robinson will be killed. Spider-Man then beats up the criminals who kidnapped Robinson but gets knocked out by the Kingpin. When he awakens he defeats the Kingpin, who triggers a time-bomb attached to Robinson in the Acme Warehouse across town. Spider-Man chooses to let the Kingpin escape in order to race to save Robinson from the bomb, then brings him to his basketball match. Robinson thanks Spider-Man but says that his arms are too numb from captivity to shoot the ball properly, so Spider-Man decides to help him out by discreetly firing his webbing at Robinson's final three-point shot to propel it into the net. Robinson's victory impresses Susan and she goes out with him, while Peter is berated by the basketball coach for seemingly not attending the game and missing his school's big win.

Peter later contemplates his bad luck, despite the fact that when he is Spider-Man, he is the world's greatest hero.

== Cast ==
- James Krieg as Peter Parker/Spider-Man
- Captain Haggerty as Wilson Fisk/Kingpin
- Ray Sutton as J. Jonah Jameson
- Thomas Wherle as Roy Robinson
- Joan Passanto as Susan
- Roswell Smith as Coach
- Greg Spence/Mark Weeks/Sven Davison/Jeremy Rodgers/Jack Douglass/David Fogg as Spider-Man

== See also ==
- Spider-Man, a 1969 fan film
- Spider-Man Versus Kraven the Hunter, a 1974 fan film
- The Green Goblin's Last Stand, a 1992 fan film
- Spider-Man Lives: A Miles Morales Story, a 2015 fan film
