= Spider-Man trilogy =

Spider-Man trilogy may refer to:

- Spider-Man (2002 film series)
- Spider-Man (2017 film series)
