= The Green Goblin's Last Stand =

- Promotional release poster
- Directed by: Dan Poole
- Written by: Dan Poole & Matt Holder
- Produced by: Dan Poole
- Starring: Dan Poole; Jimi Kinstle; Allison Adams; Bob Tull
- Distributed by: Alpha Dog Productions
- Release date: 1992
- Running time: 46 minutes
- Country: United States
- Language: English
- Budget: <$400

The Green Goblin's Last Stand is a 1992 superhero fan film by Dan Poole, based on the comic book story "The Night Gwen Stacy Died", published by Marvel Comics in The Amazing Spider-Man #121–122. Poole is the director, producer, creative editor, screenwriter, and star of the film. The film and its attendant documentary received showings and accolades at several small film festivals.

== Plot ==
Peter Parker, as his alias Spider-Man, is following a stolen vehicle. He stops the car and traps the two criminals. Afterwards, he meets his girlfriend Gwen Stacy. Peter's spider-sense detects Norman Osborn traveling in a taxi, and he learns from Gwen that Norman survived an explosion at his chemical plant. Norman returns to his home, in an amnestic state, in an attempt to find his son, Harry. In his room, he finds a newspaper detailing the explosion of Norman's plant, caused by a battle between Spider-Man and The Green Goblin. Peter visits Norman, who becomes enraged and tells him to leave. Peter believes he is unwell, and tells Gwen that Norman was obviously mentally altered after the accident. Norman sees Parker's name on the newspaper and hallucinates that Spider-Man is chasing him into the streets of New York. Three thugs harass and attack him, but are overpowered by Norman, who still believes he is attacking Spider-Man. The thugs desperately try to stop him, but he continues. One of the thugs bash a bottle on Norman's head, leaving him unconscious.

The next day, Norman wakes up in his former 'warehouse'. He finds the goblin equipment, and vows revenge on Spider-Man. Peter goes back to Norman's apartment and finds the newspaper, realizing that he has once again become the Green Goblin. He bumps into Harry Osborn, who believes his father is still in the hospital. Harry discovers that the card with the doctor's number and address is missing from his desk, but that the card had Peter's address and number on it as well. Gwen goes to look for Peter at his Darkroom, but Norman kidnaps her and takes her to the rooftops. Peter finds she is missing, and is challenged by Norman to come rescue her. Peter trips Norman with his web, but after he regains consciousness, he pushes Gwen off the roof. Peter quickly spins a web to catch Gwen, breaking her neck in the process. Enraged, Peter nearly kills Norman, but he escapes by throwing a pumpkin bomb.

Norman is tracked down by Peter to the warehouse ruins. Peter makes Norman's glider malfunction and defeats him. After asking him why he killed Gwen, Norman is apathetic, and describes her as a "pawn". Peter almost beats Norman to death again, but cannot bring himself to do so. Norman activates his glider to kill Peter, but his spider sense activates and he quickly jumps out of the way, leaving the glider to impale Norman, killing him.

At the cemetery, Peter apologizes to Gwen at her grave, stating that Norman's death only made the pain worse. He admits hesitance in being Spider-Man, but reminds himself of his promise to Uncle Ben's death that he would continue being Spider-Man.

== Cast ==
- Dan Poole as Peter Parker / Spider-Man
- Jimi Kinstle as Norman Osborn / Green Goblin
- Allison Adams as Gwen Stacy
- Bob Tull as Harry Osborn

== Production ==
Dan Poole had been a Spider-Man fan since he was a child. Prior to making this film, he had already made two shorter Spider-Man fan films. In 1992, upon hearing that James Cameron was writing a script for a Spider-Man movie, Poole decided to create a new film of his own, in order to show off his acting and stunt skills to the director. Poole choose to adapt the story "The Night Gwen Stacy Died" from The Amazing Spider-Man vol. 1, #121–122, which is considered to be a major event in Spider-Man comics, as well as in comics in general. He financed the film on a shoestring budget—less than $400—while working part-time at the National Aquarium in Baltimore. He shot the film in Baltimore, using local actors, friends, and family as cast and crew. Poole did his own stunts for the movie, including swinging on ropes, jumping off bridges, and riding on cars. On his limited budget, he could not afford any protective measures other than a pole-vaulting mat and an 18-inch-thick foam seat. It has been observed that Poole's stunt work is what sets his film apart from other fan films, overcoming "bad dialogue, pre-CGI special effects, and irregular production values". For one shot, he swung on a rope from an abandoned high-rise, swinging four stories above the ground without a safety net. At one point, the difficulty of the project pushed Poole to contemplate suicide. However, after 14 months of production, he completed the film.

When the trailer was released, the Marvel Comics characters Mysterio, Bullseye, and J. Jonah Jameson were featured significantly. However, they do not appear in the final film.

After the credits, a title card asks the question "The End?". Thus far, however, Poole has not filmed a sequel.

== Showings and reception ==
Although it received little attention initially, over the years bootleg copies of the video began appearing at comic book conventions and Internet auctions. Capitalizing on this interest, in 2002 Dan Poole produced a documentary, The Making of The Green Goblin's Last Stand, which told the story of the film's production. The two films were shown together at several film festivals, including the Backseat Film Festival, the Waterfront Film Festival, and the Johns Hopkins Film Festival. The documentary was honored at the 2002 Sundance Film Festival, where it won the "Audience Award for Best Documentary" and the "Golden Orbs Award for Best Guerrilla Marketing." Poole earned the latter award largely by enduring the snow in the festival's home of Park City, Utah to put up posters for his film while wearing a Spider-Man vest. Film Threat endorsed the "inspiring" documentary, calling it "the Hearts of Darkness of the comic-book world." The film also received the endorsement of Spider-Man co-creator Stan Lee.

== See also ==
- Spider-Man, a 1969 fan film
- Spider-Man Versus Kraven the Hunter, a 1974 fan film
- Viva Spider-Man, a 1980 fan film
- Spider-Man Lives: A Miles Morales Story, a 2015 fan film
- Spider-Man: Lotus, a 2023 fan film
