= The Fountain of Life (film) =

- Directed by: John F. Carroll; Russell Minton
- Written by: Screenplay: John F. Carroll; Additional writing:' Paul Dini
- Produced by: John F. Carroll; Russell Minton
- Starring: John F. Carroll; Bethany Harbaugh; David McCullars
- Cinematography: Greg DeBlieux; Russell Minton
- Edited by: John F. Carroll
- Music by: Christopher Barr
- Production company: Weird City Films
- Release date: August 2012
- Running time: 57 minutes
- Country: United States
- Language: English

The Fountain of Life is a 2012 fantasy-adventure fan film based on Mattel's Masters of the Universe franchise and Last of the Mohicans by James Fenimore Cooper. The film was directed by John F. Carroll and Russell Minton during the winter and spring of 2012 around Austin, Texas and the Hesse, Germany.

The film is a direct sequel to The Wizard of Stone Mountain. The wizard Malik and his friends are on their way to the mythical Fountain of Life when they are ambushed by an army of Goblins. He-Man and the heroic warriors come to their aid only to fall into a much larger conflict. The film debuted at Grayskull Con 2012 in Germany in September 2012, followed by Screenings at Power-Con 2012 in Los Angeles and the Alamo Drafthouse in Austin, Texas. The film will be free to view online and will begin streaming in early 2013.

== Plot ==
The evil Skeletor, still angry over losing Malik, The Wizard of Stone Mountain, as his bargaining chip to release a demon army from the dark dimension, devises a new plot to take over Eternia. With the aid of Evil-Lyn, Kothos and General Tataran, Skeletor tries to conquer the mythic Fountain of Life. Malik, He-Man and their friends must band together to defeat the evil warriors and prevent disaster.

== Cast ==
- John F. Carroll as Malik, General Tataran, The Faceless One, Hordak
- Chris Romani as Evil-Lyn
- David McCullars as He-Man
- LeRoy Beck as Melaktha
- Nick Orzech as Stanlan
- Javier Smith as Keldor, Zodak
- Bethany Harbaugh as Teela
- Kevin Gouldthorpe as Stratos
- Bridget Farias as Kareen
- Richard Dodwell as Kyros
- Joseph Fotinos as King Randor
- Emily Hampton as Princess Adora, She-Ra
- Blake Yelavich as Locus
- Juli Dearrington as The Sorceress
- Russell Minton as Kothos
- Andrew Brett as Skeletor
- Elisabeth Raine as Rayna
- Ben Scott as Man-At-Arms
- Taylor Basinger as Malik's Servant (Giaus)
- Björn Korthof as Prince Adam
- Johnny Bilson as Tri-Klops
- John Atkin as General Blade
- Lee Wilson as King Grayskull

== Reception ==
As of December 2012, the film has only been in limited release. Audiences have not seen the final cut of the film, but many have responded favorably – especially enjoying seeing more Masters of the Universe characters, such as He-Man.

== Sequels ==
The Fountain of Life is part of a trilogy that includes The Wizard of Stone Mountain, The Fountain of Life and The Trials of Darksmoke. The Fountain of Life is the second film in the series.
