= Live Action Toy Story =

2012 fan film of the animated classic

- The film's YouTube thumbnail, featuring Sheriff Woody and Buzz Lightyear.
- Directed by: Jonason Pauley; Jesse Perrotta (assistant director)
- Based on: Toy Story by John Lasseter, Andrew Stanton, Pete Docter, and Joe Ranft
- Cinematography: Jonason Pauley
- Edited by: Jonason Pauley
- Music by: Randy Newman
- Production companies: Jonason's Movies; NobleWolf Productions; JP and Beyond Productions
- Distributed by: JP and Beyond (YouTube)
- Release dates: June 2012 (premiere); January 12, 2013 (official YouTube upload)
- Running time: 80 minutes
- Country: United States
- Language: English
- Budget: $1,000

Live Action Toy Story is a fan film produced by the Arizona-based Jonason Pauley and Jesse Perrotta. It is an unofficial recreation and remake of the 1995 animated film Toy Story, with the toy characters animated through stop-motion or filmed moving with wires and strings.

== Production ==
Pauley and Perrotta began the project after viewing Toy Story 3 (2010), originally planning for only one clip of Toy Story (1995) to be recreated.

The production of the remake was funded through loans from family members and friends, some of whom also served as actors in the film.

Pauley's home served as the location for both Andy and Sid's rooms. Two arcades in Mesa and Oregon, and a Tempe Peter Piper Pizza restaurant, were the locations for Pizza Planet.

Live Action Toy Story was shot over the course of two years, with editing done during filming. The first six months of shooting concentrated on scenes that took place in Andy's room. More scenes were filmed in 2011 around the home and on the streets, with backgrounds of homes shot in neighborhoods close to the creators. A challenge when scouting locations in Arizona was making the settings look similar to Californian suburbs, including outdoor scenes.

== Reception ==
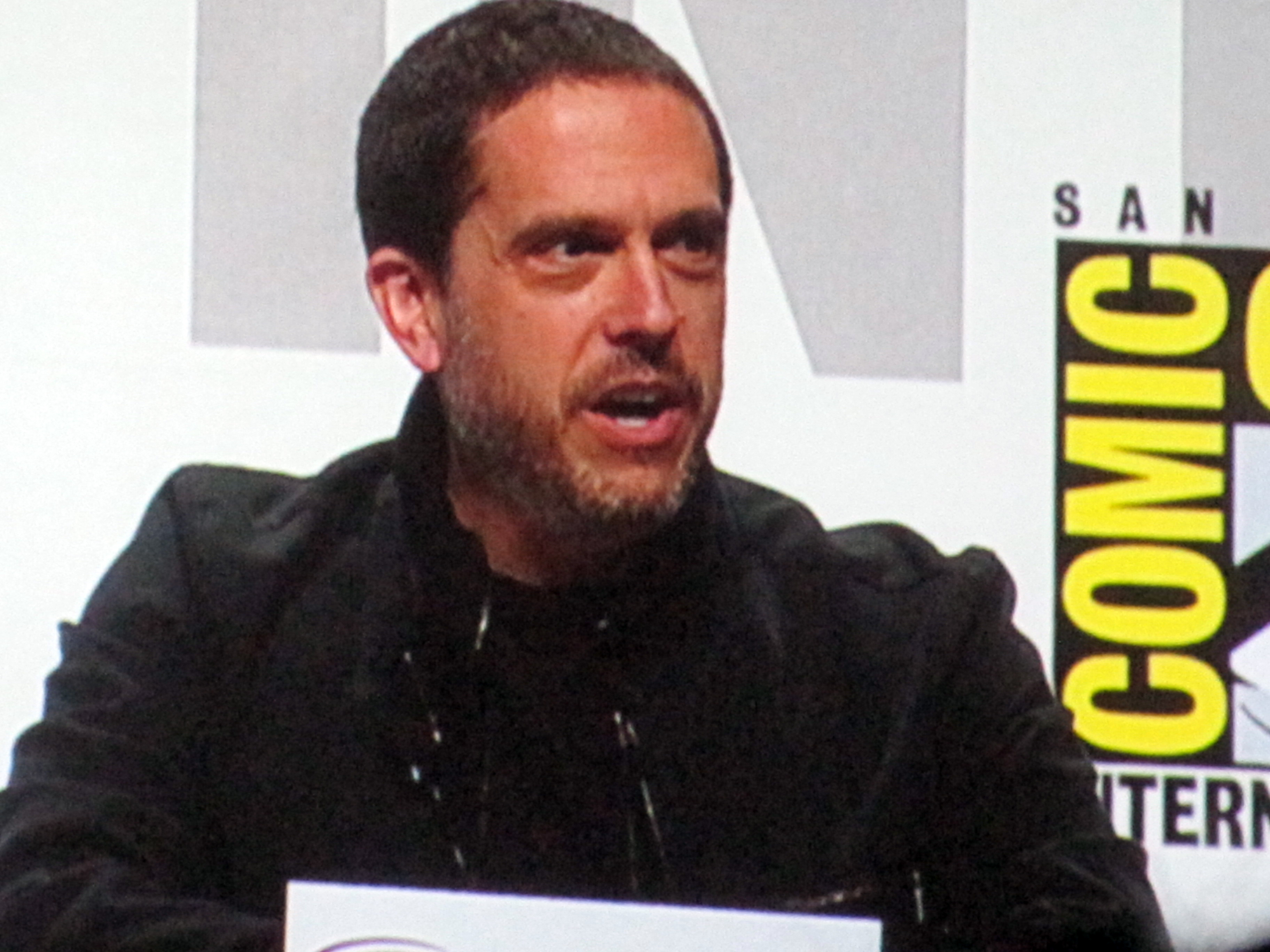
Lee Unkrich, an editor of the original Toy Story movie as well as the director of the third film, tweeted that Live Action Toy Story was done by a "VERY dedicated" group of people.

To drive interest in the project, the production process was documented on the film's Facebook page, and behind-the-scenes videos, plus a live-action recreation of the ending of Toy Story 3, were uploaded to YouTube.

In September 2011, Gizmodo published an article covering a sneak peek of the project uploaded to JP and Beyond.

The Toy Story 3 ending remake was covered by New York magazine's Vulture blog and the Pixar Times upon its May 2012 upload. Upon the trailer's August 2012 release, the two filmmakers were interviewed about the project on Right This Minute.

Upon its release in 2013, Live Action Toy Story was covered by Boys' Life, The Verge, Collider, NBC News, Slate, Laughing Squid, MTV News, The Huffington Post, Gothamist, Wired, CNET, Vulture, NME, and The Hollywood Reporter which claimed it to be "a crown jewel in the fan-made tribute video community."

It garnered more than 250,000 views in 24 hours and reached 1.7 million views within two days before surpassing the three million mark on its third day. Two weeks after its upload, the video had more than eight million views. American filmmaker and editor of the original Toy Story movie Lee Unkrich, in a now deleted tweet, posted about the remake on the day of release, describing it as done by a "VERY dedicated" team. As Fast Company journalist Joe Berkowitz described the film's appeal, "Although the strings controlling Woody and Buzz Lightyear may be visible in nearly every frame, you can also see the creators’ giddy affection for the source material, and for the craft of filmmaking in general."
