= Metal Gear Solid: Philanthropy =

2009 Italian fan-made film series

- Directed by: Giacomo Talamini
- Written by: Giacomo Talamini; Enrico Pasotti; Valentina Paggiarin
- Based on: Metal Gear series by Konami
- Starring: Giacomo Talamini; Nicola Cecconi; Patrizia Liccardi; Marco Saran; Andrea Furlan; Giovanni Contessotto; Enrico Pasotti
- Cinematography: Mattia Gri
- Edited by: Giacomo Talamini
- Music by: Daniel James; Roberto Carlucci
- Production company: Hive Division
- Distributed by: Hive Division
- Release date: 21 October 2009
- Running time: 69 minutes
- Country: Italy
- Language: English
- Budget: €10,000 (approx. US$15,000)

Metal Gear Solid: Philanthropy is a 2009 Italian non-profit fan made film series created by Hive Division, a team of Italian students and filmmakers. It is a film based on the highly successful Metal Gear video game series. It is written, directed and edited by Giacomo Talamini, who also stars as Solid Snake.

== Production ==
Metal Gear Solid: Philanthropy was conceived in 2002 when Talamini and school friend Gianluca were playing Metal Gear Solid 2: Sons of Liberty. The game had a significant impact on the two and they decided to create a film based on the series. Using equipment they had lying around, they started work on what is now known as the Old Project. After two years, production came to a halt. They had released a trailer but interest in the project was dying.

In 2005, the group (then known as Shamrock Creations) met in Venice to discuss the direction of the project. They refocused their aim and renamed themselves Hive Division after Gianluca left the group. The new project was called the New Project. Recruiting almost 40 people, Hive Division continued work on the film and started shooting at different locations around Italy until July 2008, when the building used in the final scene was demolished. In winter 2008, Hive Division found an alternate location and filming continued. In March 2009, filming was complete and post-processing began. Aoife Ní Fhearraigh, whose song "The Best is Yet to Come" was used for the Metal Gear Solid soundtrack, was hired to perform "Will There Be an End", the film's ending theme.

Metal Gear Solid: Philanthropy was funded entirely by Hive Division, who invested almost €10,000 (£9,000 GBP/$13,000 USD) in the production. Most of the money went towards equipment and props.

The film features a number of Italian actors, and the script was dubbed by voice actors to recreate the game's voice work (in particular, an imitation of David Hayter's Solid Snake).

== Plot ==
The film is divided into three parts, the first part entitled "The Overnight Nation" is sixty-nine minutes long and follows Snake as he joins Philanthropy, an organization created to stop Metal Gears around the world. Snake (Giacomo Talamini) teams up with Elizabeth Laeken (Patrizia Liccardi) and Pierre Leclerc (Nicola Cecconi) as they attempt to find out what's really going on in "The Overnight Nation". The film is set in 2007, taking place before or shortly after the first part of Metal Gear Solid 2: Sons of Liberty.

A quote from Hive Division states:

Philanthropy explores ideas such as genetics, which is a recurring theme in the Metal Gear series; memetics, the study of how culture, habits, and information evolve, expand, how it is used and abused.

Parts two and three were planned for a release in 2014, but were cancelled due to licensing issues with Konami. The first twelve minutes of Part 2 are viewable on the network.

== Cast ==
=== Starring ===
- Giacomo Talamini as Solid Snake and Armstech PMC Trooper
- Patrizia Liccaridi as Elizabeth Laeken
- Nicola Cecconi as Pierre Leclerc
- Marco Saran as Harrison Bishop
- Giovanni Contessotto as Abraham Bishop
- Andrea Furlan as Vitalij
- Enrico Pasotti as Aran

=== Voice acting ===
- Philipp Sacramento as Solid Snake
- Lucien Dodge as Pierre Leclerc and Harrison Bishop
- Laura Post as Elizabeth Laeken
- Adam Behr as Abraham Bishop
- Glenn X Govan as Vitalij
- William Martin as Otacon
- Alessandro Schiassi as Russian Pilot
- Alberto Vazzola as Russian Pilot
- Jonathan Ealam as Newscaster

=== Post-production ===
- Visual effects supervisor: Alessandro Schiassi
- 3D lead artist: Alberto Vazzola
- Concept artist: Lamberto Azzariti

== Reception ==
PlayStation Official Magazine UK praised the CGI work and remarked at the locations of scenes within the film, while Destructoid.com claims the film will be better than its Hollywood counterpart. Metal Gear creator Hideo Kojima has stated that he has watched the film and was moved by the love of the film makers towards Metal Gear Solid, commenting that it was well made and that he was awaiting the next part. This stands in contrast to Konami's decision to decline the authorization of the sequel on licensing grounds.

== Availability ==
Released 27 September 2009 the film is available for online stream through two online video sharing websites, Vimeo, and YouTube.
