= The Wizard of Stone Mountain =

- Masters of the Universe: The Wizard of Stone Mountain
- Directed by: John F. Carroll; Russell Minton
- Written by: Janis Diamond; Paul Dini
- Screenplay by: John F. Carroll; Russell Minton
- Based on: Faust by Johann Wolfgang von Goethe
- Produced by: John F. Carroll; Russell Minton
- Starring: John F. Carroll; Bethany Harbaugh; Blake Yelavich
- Cinematography: Greg DeBlieux; Joshua Marriott
- Edited by: John F. Carroll; Greg DeBlieux
- Music by: Christopher Barr; Braden Hunt
- Production company: Weird City Films
- Release date: August 2011
- Running time: 72 minutes
- Country: United States
- Language: English
- Budget: $10 thousand

The Wizard of Stone Mountain is a 2011 fantasy-adventure fan film based upon Mattel's Masters of the Universe franchise and Faust by Johann Wolfgang von Goethe. The film was directed by John F. Carroll and Russell Minton during the summer of 2010 around Austin, Texas and the Texas Hill Country.

The film centers around the young wizard, Malik and his obsession with power. Desperate to help his ailing people, he calls upon evil forces he cannot control, ultimately selling his soul to the devil in order to save his village and win the love of his life. The film debuted at Grayskull Con 2011 in Germany during September 2011, followed by screenings at Power-Con 2011 in Los Angeles and the Alamo Drafthouse in Austin, Texas. The film is free to view online and began streaming on Halloween Night 2011.

== Plot ==
On the planet Eternia, both the forces of good and evil struggle for the ultimate power of the universe. But for some, power is not enough. The evil Skeletor, ever plotting his conquest of Eternia turns his eye to one of the last remaining wizards of the old kingdom—Malik, The Wizard of Stone Mountain. Tucked in the sleepy village of Artana at the base of the Mystic Mountains, Skeletors' ally, Evil-Lyn summons a demon, Locus, to manipulate Malik. Tampering with magic beyond his control, Malik makes a Faustian deal with Locus to help his people and win the love of his life. It is up to the heroic Masters of the Universe to save Malik from certain doom.

== Cast ==
- John F. Carroll as Malik
- Chris Romani as Evil-Lyn
- LeRoy Beck as Melaktha
- Nick Orzech as Stanlan
- Suzanne Orzech as Stanlan's Mother
- Mark Orzech as Stanlan's Father
- Javier Smith as Chief Carnivas
- Braden Hunt as Count Marzo
- Bethany Harbaugh as Teela
- Allison Wood as Brina, The Royal Healer
- Jacquelyn Lies as Kesara, The Royal Healer
- Candice Adams Roma as Endymia, The Royal Healer
- Ron Weisberg as Fisto
- Kevin Gouldthorpe as Stratos
- James Ireland as the Village of Artana Merchant
- Bridget Farias as Kareen
- Richard Dodwell as Kyros
- Joseph Fotinos as King Randor
- Emily Hampton as Princess Adora
- Angela Pierce as Deirdra
- Parker Danks as Chad
- Xaq Webb as Bradaen
- Blake Yelavich as Locus
- Juli Dearrington as The Sorceress
- Russell Minton as Kothos
- John "Sarge" Stewart as the Evergreen Forest Pilgrim
- Andrew Brett as Skeletor
- Elisabeth Giminiani as the daughter of Eli, a child in the village of Artana
- Kile Moore as Eli, a father in the village of Artana
- Laura Cannon as the wife of Eli, a mother in the village of Artana
- Ben Scott as Man-At-Arms
- Taylor Basinger as Malik's Servant (Giaus)
- Brian Bogart as Prince Adam
- Tyler Belcik as Tri-Klops

== Reception ==
Based upon interviews in Masters Cast and forum discussion* fans have generally enjoyed and supported the film, despite some flaws in filmmaking technique. Like many films of this type, sci-fi/horror with low/no budget, it is to be enjoyed because of (not despite) the flaws.

== Sequels ==
The Wizard of Stone Mountain is part of a trilogy that includes The Fountain of Life and The Trials of Darksmoke. The Wizard of Stone Mountain is the first film in the trilogy.
