= Raiders of the Lost Ark: The Adaptation =

1989 American fan film

- Directed by: Eric Zala
- Screenplay by: Lawrence Kasdan
- Story by: George Lucas; Philip Kaufman
- Produced by: Chris Strompolos
- Starring: Chris Strompolos; Angela Rodriguez; Eric Zala
- Cinematography: Jayson Lamb
- Edited by: Jayson Lamb
- Music by: John Williams
- Production company: Rolling Boulder Films
- Release date: 1989
- Running time: 100 minutes
- Budget: c. $5000

Raiders of the Lost Ark: The Adaptation is a 1989 American fan film, made as a shot-for-shot remake of the 1981 Indiana Jones adventure film Raiders of the Lost Ark. Using the original film's screenplay and score, it principally starred and was filmed, directed, and produced over a seven-year period by three Mississippi teenagers (Chris Strompolos, Eric Zala, and Jayson Lamb).

== Plot ==
Set in 1936, the film pits Indiana Jones (Strompolos) against a group of Nazis who are searching for the Ark of the Covenant which Adolf Hitler believes will make his army invincible.

== Cast ==
Taken from theraider.net:

- Chris Strompolos as Indiana Jones
- Angela Rodriguez as Marion Ravenwood
- Eric Zala as Dr. René Belloq
- Ted Ross as Arnold Toht
- Alan Stenum as Sallah
- William Coon as Marcus Brody

== Production ==
Shooting for the film began in 1982, when Strompolos, Zala and Lamb were only 12 years old, and continued over the next seven summers. It was made on a shoe-string budget of around $5000, greatly contrasting with the original's $18 million budget. It was shot out of sequence, so due to its long filming period many actors randomly appear at different ages throughout the course of the film. As Raiders of the Lost Ark was not available on any home media format when they began filming, they were forced to collect all kinds of material about the film, including magazine articles, photographs, and even an illicit recording of the film's audio captured during a re-release screening of the original film in 1982.

In 2014, members of the cast raised money on Kickstarter to re-unite and complete the film with the one scene they were not able to re-create as teenagers: the explosion of the flying wing aircraft.

== Reception ==
Raiders of the Lost Ark: The Adaptation was finally finished and premiered in 1989 at the auditorium of the local Coca-Cola plant in Gulfport, Mississippi. Later, the boys went their separate ways, going off to college, and the film was largely forgotten. In 2002, Eli Roth (who had obtained a multi-generation dub of the film while in film school) gave a copy to Ain't It Cool News' Harry Knowles, hoping that Knowles would screen it at that year's Butt-Numb-a-Thon film festival. When a late delivery for the premiere screening of The Lord of the Rings: The Two Towers led to a gap in the schedule, Knowles played the Adaptation to fill in time. It was so well received by the audience that when the film was stopped right before a popular action scene, the audience reportedly booed the Rings premiere, wanting to see the rest of the Raiders adaptation. The film has a 100% rating on review aggregator Rotten Tomatoes based on nine reviews.

With the excitement from this partial screening, Roth tracked down Strompolos, Zala, and Lamb, and an official screening was held at the Alamo Drafthouse in Austin, Texas in 2003. By this time, the film had also reached Steven Spielberg, who wrote a letter to the filmmakers, calling the boys' achievement an inspiration. Some time later, while the filmmakers were in Los Angeles promoting the film, Spielberg invited them to meet with him at his office.

Since the release of Raiders of the Lost Ark: The Adaptation, and despite its amateur status and the poor quality of the surviving copies, critics have generally praised the spirit and dedication of the filmmakers. Lee Sandlin of The Chicago Reader even hinted that the film was "better than the original".

In 2004, film producer Scott Rudin purchased the rights to make a film about the experience of the three boys, with Daniel Clowes writing the screenplay. A separate project, Raiders!: The Story of the Greatest Fan Film Ever Made, directed by Tim Skousen and Jeremy Coon, was released on June 17, 2016.

== Home media ==
Raiders of the Lost Ark: The Adaptation was released to DVD and digital on The Raiders Guy's official website.

== Popular culture ==
A clip of Raiders of the Lost Ark: The Adaptation was featured in a 2018 episode of The Goldbergs, titled "Adam Spielberg".
