= Eldor =

Eldor is a masculine given name and a surname that may refer to the following notable people:

- Eldor Shomurodov (born 1995), Uzbek football forward
- Eldor Urazbayev (1940–2012), Russian film director, screenwriter and producer
- Hussein Eldor (born 1994), Lebanese football player
