= Spider-Man Versus Kraven the Hunter =

- Directed by: Bruce Cardozo
- Written by: Bruce Cardozo
- Based on: Spider-Man by Stan Lee; Steve Ditko
- Produced by: Bruce Cardozo
- Starring: Joe Ellison; A. Andrew Pastorio
- Edited by: Julie Tanser
- Release date: 1974
- Running time: 30 minutes
- Country: United States
- Language: English

Spider-Man Versus Kraven the Hunter is a 1974 American superhero short film written and directed by Bruce Cardozo. It is a fan film that was endorsed by Marvel Comics and authorized by Stan Lee.

== Plot ==
The screenplay was adapted primarily from The Amazing Spider-Man #15, with various scenes added to update the story concerning Kraven's first arrival in America. Spider-Man swings down and catches a group organizing a bank robbery and upon dropping in unexpectedly, a man escapes and contacts Kraven the Hunter. Parker finds this out firsthand when taking photographs for The Daily Bugle when Kraven arrives by boat. After studying Spider-Man's fighting style by organizing a robbery for Spider-Man to stop, Kraven finally comes out of hiding and fights Spider-Man. Spider-Man realizes the true strength of Kraven.

== History ==
According to an article in the 1973 issue of FOOM, the film features appearances by Kraven the Hunter and Gwen Stacy, and the story is based on issue fifteen of the comic book, The Amazing Spider-Man.

In October 1972, director Bruce Cardozo wrote a letter to Stan Lee explaining the project. He received a very enthusiastic letter of approval providing the film was limited to a non-commercial exhibition (because of commercial licensing commitments Marvel Comics had at the time). Next, he presented the idea to his experimental film class, proposing a half-hour, 16mm, color, sound, semi-professional Spider-Man movie. When he outlined the special effects the class felt that it was impossible, but his instructor, Peter Glushanok, was very interested and gave Cardozo the go-ahead. The first term was spent almost entirely in pre-production. Bruce was a perfectionist and spoke with hundreds of people before deciding on the cast alone. He wanted the audience to say to themselves, "he or she looks and acts exactly like the characters". Daphne Stevens and Marilyn Hecht made the costumes, Richard Eberhardt designed the graphics, such as the Spider-Signal, (as well as playing Spider-Man in costume) and Art Schweitzer created the unusual lighting effects featured throughout the film. Bruce worked on the scenario, production direction and special effects.

They built an entire section of the building for Spider-Man to climb. They used travelling matte shots to make Spider-Man swing through Times Square at night with all the neon signs flashing in the background to produce breathtaking and dazzling visuals. Rather than using a phoney-looking backdrop when Spider-Man climbs up and down buildings, they matted in colorful sunsets and backgrounds and utilized travelling mattes in a scene where Kraven sends lions after Spider-Man in the final conflict.

The second term was hectic with more shooting and editing by Julie Tanser. When the film was about 3/4 finished, they gave Stan Lee, Roy Thomas and other members of the bullpen, a preview of some of the key scenes of the film. They were very impressed and enthusiastic about the results and encouraged them to finish the project.

On March 30, 2008, author Clive Young, renowned for his book Homemade Hollywood: Fans Behind the Camera, sat down with Bruce to discuss the film. In Cardozo's own words, "I gave a glimpse of the future in 1974 showing what could be done with Spider-Man. People said the special effects were dazzling, but that wasn't really it - we had the audience rooting for him like how you root for a team."

== Known screenings ==
Over the subsequent years, Bruce was persuaded to hold screenings of the finished film only occasionally at comic book conventions:

- Ann Arbor 13th Film Festival in 1975 (the first screening).
- Marvel's second annual Comics Convention in 1976.
- The Comic Book and Science Fiction Convention in Los Angeles in 2002 and 2005 at the Shrine Expo Hall.
- Comic Con 2008 (the last confirmed screening).

== Availability ==
Bruce and his crew had hoped to have the film distributed in some form in the future, but on April 24, 2015, Bruce died, and his computer containing the only known copy of the film was destroyed, making it a lost film.

For a while, it was believed that this was the only copy of the film, stored on Bruce's personal computer and thus destroyed with it after his death. More recent information indicates that the film may actually have also been dubbed onto multiple hardcopy formats - including 16mm film, VHS & DVD - raising faint but real hope that it still exists.

According to Bill Baldwin, a longtime friend of Bruce's, he provided new details about the fate of the remaining prints. Bruce's apartment was burglarized in 2010, and the burglars seemed specifically after the negatives of Spider-Man Versus Kraven the Hunter. This makes sense, as the legend of the lost Spider-Man film had by that time become common knowledge within the fan community, and even of some potential value thanks to Stan Lee's approval. At any rate, shortly after the burglary, Bruce placed the negatives in a more secure location - likely a safe-deposit box.

For now, this film is currently lost, with only a few, mostly behind-the-scenes screenshots still in circulation. Unlike many other fan productions, there is no record of it having surfaced as a bootleg at comic book conventions or online, and no one besides its creator has ever been confirmed to have a personal copy.

In December 2021, author Clive Young released four new color stills of the film, showcasing a shot of Spider-Man wall-crawling, a group of thugs getting ambushed by the Spider-Signal (a device that Spider-Man used during the early comics), a fight scene featuring Spider-Man taking down the group of thugs, and the first full look at Kraven.

== Still images from the film ==
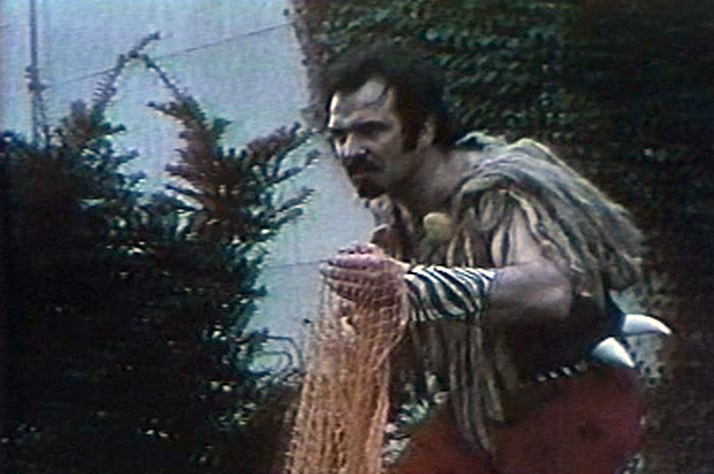
The first full look at Kraven the Hunter as seen in the film, played by an unknown actor.

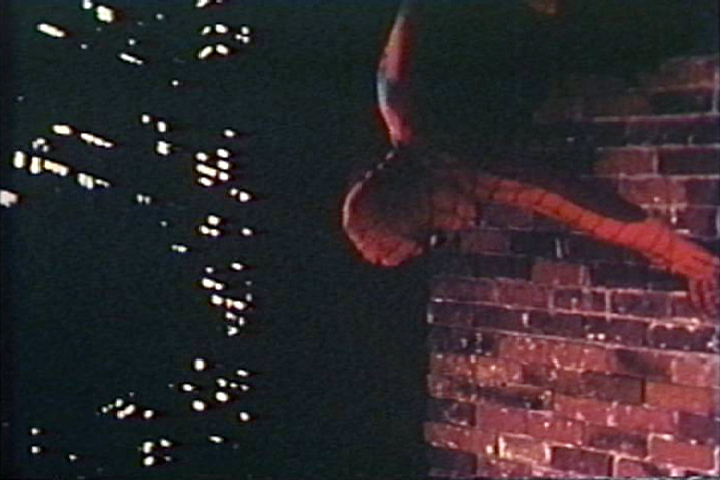
Production still from the film showing the wall-crawling effects in action.

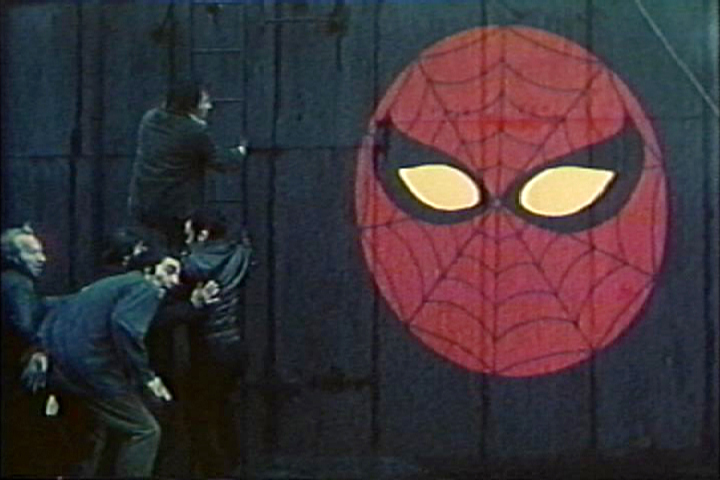
Production still from the film, showing the Spider-Signal.

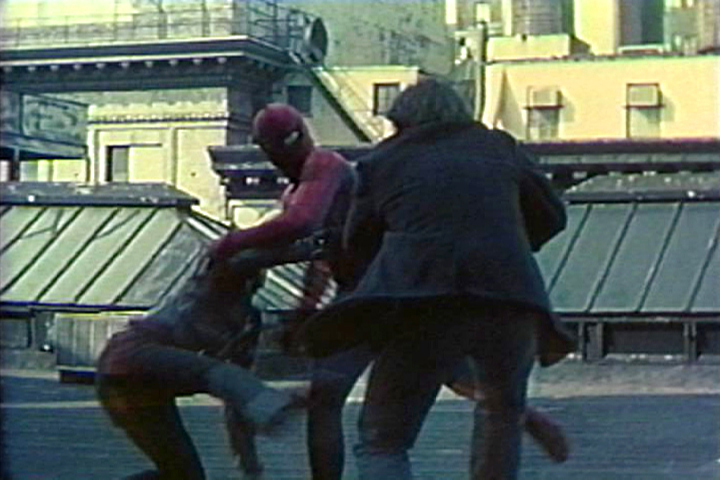
Production still from the film, apparently showing the initial battle with the thugs.

== Behind-the-scenes photos from the film ==
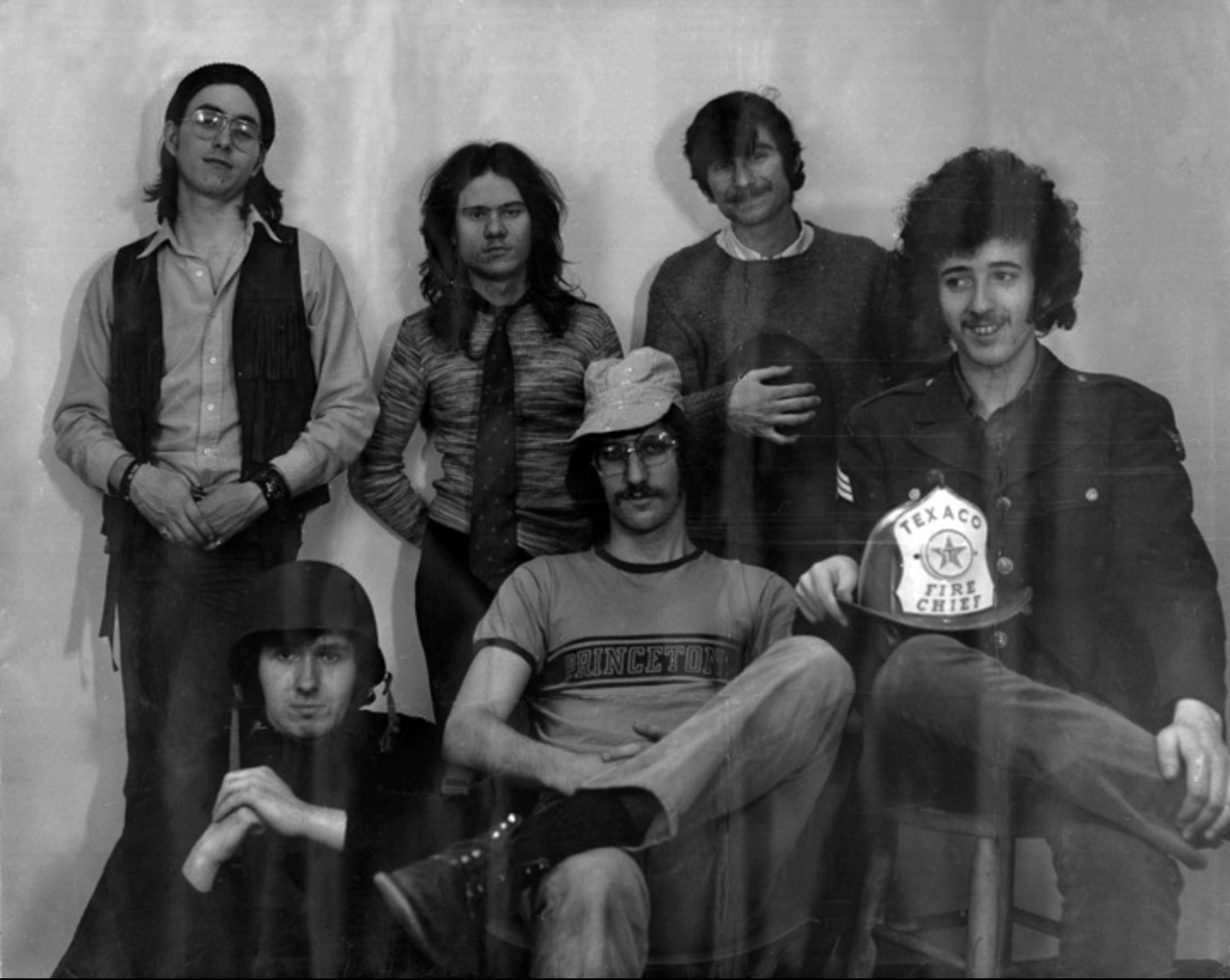
Production crew behind the film.

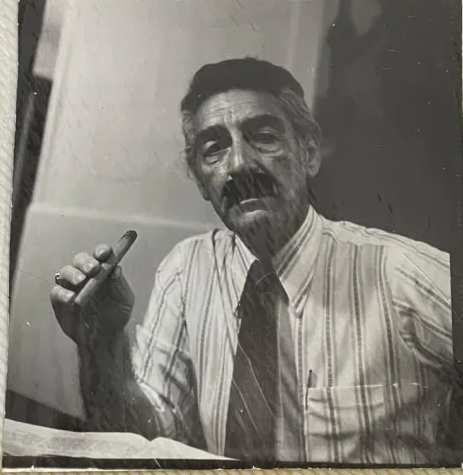
Additional shots of Andrew Pastorio as Jameson.

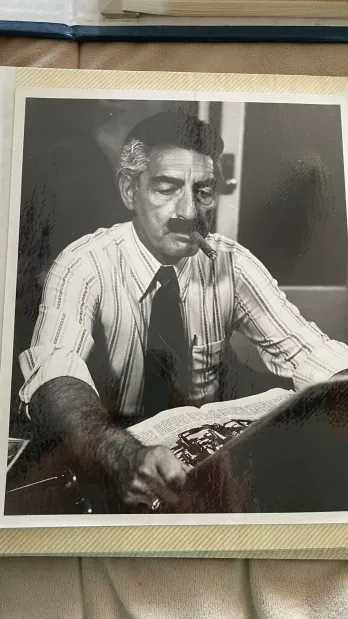
Additional shots of Andrew Pastorio as Jameson.

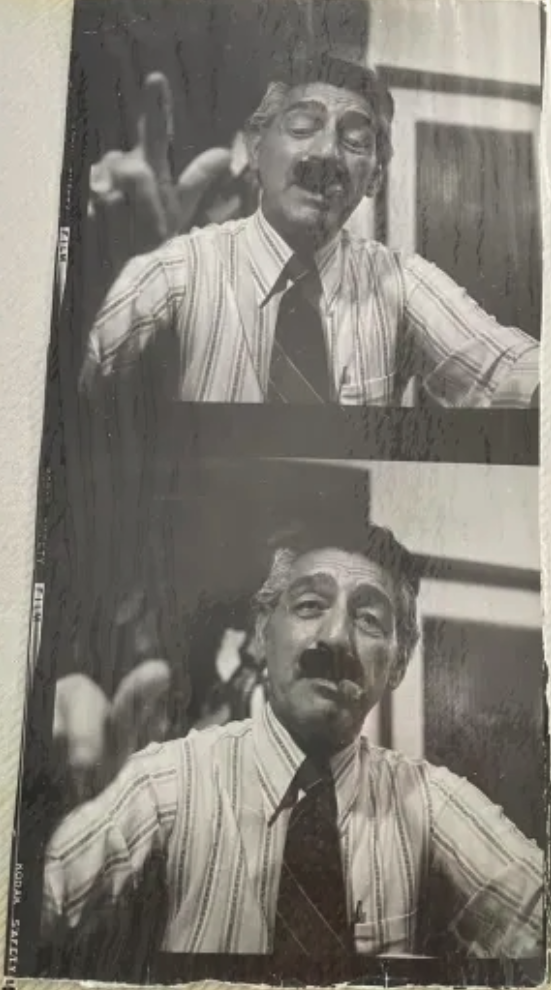
Additional shots of Andrew Pastorio as Jameson for FOOM.

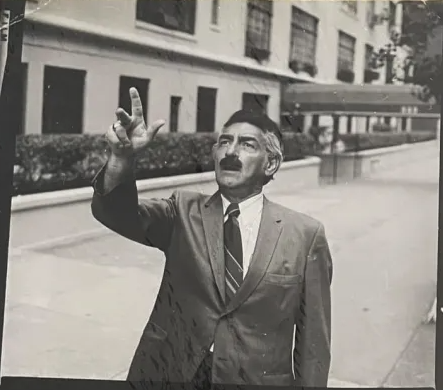
An opening shot of Andrew Pastorio as Jameson.

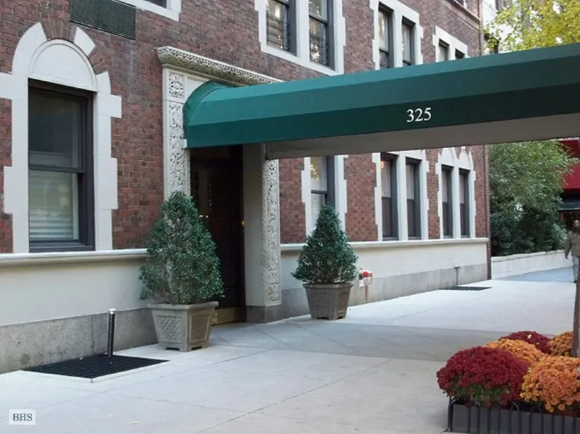
The real-life location used for an outdoor shot of Jameson.

== Cast ==
Due to the film being lost and no mentions of the actual cast in interviews or articles, the only two known actors in the film are Joe Ellison, who played Spider-Man, and A. Andrew Pastorio, who played J. Jonah Jameson. The actors of the other two confirmed characters in the film, the titular villain Kraven the Hunter and Gwen Stacy, are unknown. The identities of Ellison and Pastorio are only known due to Cardozo mentioning them in a FOOM article in December 1973, and a review of the film, in which both of their names and their roles are mentioned. Also in Cardozo's FOOM article, he mentions the names of most of the behind-the-scenes workers.

=== Actors ===
- Joe Ellison as Peter Parker / Spider-Man
- A. Andrew Pastorio as J. Jonah Jameson
- Unknown actress as Gwen Stacy
- Unknown actor as Kraven the Hunter

=== Behind the scenes ===
- Bruce Cardozo – director
- Daphne Stevens – costume designer
- Marilyn Hecht – costume designer
- Richard Ebenhardt – graphic designer / Spider-Man stunt double
- Art Schweitzer – lighting
- Julie Tanser – editing

== Reception ==
The casting was very well received by Marvel Comics employees. The realistic suit for Spider-Man was acclaimed and the casting of Andrew Pastorio as J. Jonah Jameson and Joe Ellison as Peter Parker received praise for their likeness to the characters.

== See also ==
- Spider-Man, a 1969 fan film
- Viva Spider-Man, a 1980 fan film
