= Arthur Haggerty =

American actor

- Born: December 3, 1931; The Bronx, New York, United States
- Died: July 3, 2006 (aged 74); United States
- Other names: Captain Haggerty
- Occupation(s): Actor, dog trainer
- Known for: Zombi 2

Captain Arthur Haggerty (December 3, 1931 – July 3, 2006) was an American actor and dog trainer.

== Biography ==
Born in The Bronx on December 3, 1931, Haggerty had an affinity to Boxers, Doberman Pinschers and German Shepherds. He wanted to become a show dog handler.

During his three combat tours in Korea, he served as the Captain of the K9 Corps. His record as a Ranger in the United States Army included a Congressional Commendation and a Bronze Star. After returning from Korea, in 1961 or 1962, he opened Tri State School for Dogs then eventually renamed it Captain Haggerty's School for Dogs.

In the early 1970s he began supplying dogs for film, television and Broadway. In the Burt Reynolds' movie Shamus, he provided dogs and made a cameo in the film. Some of his movie credits include: Married to the Mob, Honeymoon in Vegas, The Last Dragon and an appearance in the opening scenes of Zombi 2 as a rotting, shambling zombie that attacks a coast guard officer on a derelict boat. His television appearances include The Tonight Show with Johnny Carson, The Morton Downey Jr. Show and David Letterman where he and his dog students appeared 26 times in Stupid Pet Tricks.

According to Haggerty, his dual professions of being a character actor and dog trainer caused confusion among his dog school clients and film industry contacts. Since he was known as 'Captain Haggerty' at his dog school, and then known as Arthur Haggerty on film sets, he decided to legally change his name to Captain Haggerty in order to combine both of his professions so that people would know who he really was on and off camera.

He wrote hundreds of articles on dogs and won the Howell Award given by the Dog Writer's Association of America. His three books are: Dog Tricks, How to Get Your Pet Into Show Business and How to Teach Your Dog to Talk. He also wrote and published the Aggression Newsletter from 1997 to 2006.

Captain Arthur Haggerty died in West Palm Beach, Florida from adenocarcinoma July 3, 2006 at age 74. His only child, Babette Haggerty is also a dog trainer.
