= Raiders!: The Story of the Greatest Fan Film Ever Made =

2015 American documentary film by Jeremy Coon and Tim Skousen

- Movie poster
- Directed by: Jeremy Coon; Tim Skousen
- Written by: Jeremy Coon; Tim Skousen
- Produced by: Jermey Coon; Tim Skousen
- Starring: Chris Strompolos; Eric Zala; Jayson Lamb; Angela Rodriguez; Ernest Cline; Casey Dillard; Francisco Gonzalez; Chris Gore; John Hudgens; Guy James Klender; Harry Knowles; Scott Lionberger; Michael Mobley; Karl Preusser; John Rhys-Davies; Eli Roth; Mark Spain; Kurt Zala
- Cinematography: Tim Irwin; Ed Stephenson
- Edited by: Barry Poltermann; Tim Skousen
- Music by: Anton Sanko
- Distributed by: Drafthouse Films
- Release date: March 14, 2015 (South by Southwest Film Festival)
- Running time: 106 minutes
- Country: United States
- Language: English

Raiders!: The Story of the Greatest Fan Film Ever Made is a 2015 American documentary film directed by Jeremy Coon and Tim Skousen. The film follows three childhood friends, Eric Zala, Chris Strompolos, and Jayson Lamb, from 1982 to 1989 as they set out to make a fan film of Raiders of the Lost Ark. 35 years later in 2014, it shows how they get back together to finish filming the "plane sequence", a previously missing scene from their remake.

== Reception ==
Raiders!: The Story of the Greatest Fan Film Ever Made received positive reviews from critics.

The review aggregation website Rotten Tomatoes reported a 91% approval rating with an average rating of 7.09/10 based on 53 reviews. The website's consensus reads: "As fascinating as it is affecting, Raiders! offers an insightful look at fan culture while presenting a poignant portrait of friendship over the passage of time." Metacritic assigned a score of 70 out of 100, based on 20 critics, indicating "generally favorable reviews".

Chris Nashawaty of Entertainment Weekly gave the film an "A" rating, and called it "amazing". Lanre Bakare of The Guardian gave the film a four out of five star rating, and said: "The documentary detailing Eric Zala and Chris Strompolos’s painstaking shot-for-shot remake of Raiders of the Lost Ark captures the lunacy and love of fandom and friendship..." Odie Henderson of RogerEbert.com gave the film a three out of four star rating, praising the storytelling, describing it as, "truly Spielbergian". He also called it, "...a love poem to film geeks everywhere..." Mike D'Angelo of The A.V. Club gave the film a "B", and said the film "captures the spirit" of the Orson Welles quote regarding filmmaking, "the biggest electric-train set any boy ever had." Scott Weinberg of Nerdist gave the film a three and a half out of five star rating: "[The film] is half sweet and half sour; it pays homage to a brilliantly influential movie, it illustrates the simple joys of fanboy imitation games, and it shows how honest enthusiasm can gradually transform itself into ego, arrogance, and borderline obsession." Chris Agar of Screen Rant said: "[The film] is a fascinating illustration of the power of film and why movies can be magical, making a statement about why the art form is important."
