= Spider-Man (1969 film) =

- Set photo of Donald F. Glut and Donna Shannon
- Directed by: Donald F. Glut
- Written by: Donald F. Glut
- Based on: Spider-Man by: Stan Lee; Steve Ditko
- Produced by: Donald F. Glut
- Starring: Donald F. Glut; Donna Shane; Bob Rosen; Jim Hormon; Rick Mitchell; Bill Obbarge
- Narrated by: Donald F. Glut
- Release date: 1969
- Running time: 12 minutes
- Country: North America
- Language: English

Spider-Man is a 1969 American superhero short film that was directed by Donald F. Glut. It is an unauthorized fan film, one of several made by Glut and the last one of its type that he created. The short was later released along with several of Glut's other shorts as a special feature of I Was a Teenage Movie Maker, a 2006 documentary about Glut. The short's plot centers around Spider-Man, who must rescue a woman from her father, the devious villain Dr. Lightning, an original character Glut created for the film.

Filming took place in Glut's apartment home as well as at Bronson Canyon, and Glut achieved the wall-climbing scenes by turning the camera sideways. He also utilized other effects such as stop-motion animation and backwards photography, as well as the use of miniature figures. Glut initially screened the film at the home of Michael Nesmith, a friend of his, and later persuaded a projectionist into showing the short at a theater showing student shorts from the University of Southern California.

== Plot ==
The short opens with Spider-Man using his webbing to grab a Daily Bugle newspaper with a headline about a disfigured scientist becoming a villain by the name of Dr. Lightning. The film then cuts to Randy Robertson and Dr. Lightning's daughter, who hopes that by exposing her father he will return to the rational, non-evil man he used to be. Her attempts are for naught, as she's kidnapped by her father's henchman Rekov and taken away to a nearby canyon, but not before Rekov shoots Randy in the shoulder. Spider-Man appears moments later and upon seeing that Randy will live, goes to rescue the young woman.

Once in the desert Spider-Man confronts Dr. Lightning and Rekov. A struggle breaks out and in the chaos Dr. Lightning shoots and kills his henchman with a ray gun. He then flees, but not before Spider-Man can attach a homing beacon to his car. Spider-Man manages to locate the villain's car and tries to stop him by trapping his car with his webbing, only for Dr. Lightning to shoot the webbing, which causes the car to drop into the canyon and explode. Spider-Man returns to the villain's daughter and informs her of his death, stating that now she and the world are safe.

== Cast ==
- Donald F. Glut as Peter Parker / Spider-Man
- Jim Harmon as Rekov
- Rick Mitchell as Randy Robertson
- Bill Obbagy as a bystander
- Bob Rosen as Dr. Lightning
- Donna Shannon as Dr. Lightning's daughter

== Reception ==
Critical reception for the film since its release in 1969 has been mostly positive, and Bleeding Cool has compared it to a Ray Dennis Steckler film with lower production values. Geeks of Doom rated the short favorably, poking fun at it while also favorably commenting on what special effects Glut was able to accomplish with "a lot of free time, some expendable toys, and a few handy firecrackers." ComicsAlliance expressed a similar opinion, writing "Even though it was clearly made on what could charitably be referred to as a pretty low budget, Glut’s Spider-Man has an awful lot of charm." The Reelz Channel also reviewed the short, remarking that it was "earnest, though still unintentionally hilarious".
