= List of programs broadcast by Teletoon Retro =

Teletoon Retro aired programs primarily from Hanna-Barbera and Warner Bros. Animation along with live action shows and Canadian-produced shows. Select programs from Cartoon Network were aired during the channel's later years.

== Former programming ==
Programs acquired from Hanna-Barbera
Title	Date(s) run	Note(s)
Captain Caveman	2007 - 2009	
Josie and the Pussycats	2008 - 2011	
Laff-A-Lympics	2007 - 2009	
Scooby-Doo	2007 - 2015	
The Banana Splits	2007 - 2009	
The Flintstones	2007 - 2015	
The Huckleberry Hound Show	2008 - 2009	
The Jetsons	2007 - 2015	
The New Scooby-Doo Movies	2010 - 2015	
The Smurfs	2008 - 2015	
The Yogi Bear Show	2007 - 2013	
The 13 Ghosts of Scooby-Doo	2007 - 2009	
Wait Till Your Father Gets Home	2007 - 2009	

Programs acquired from Warner Bros. Animation
Title	Date(s) run	Note(s)
Animaniacs	2014 - 2015	
Batman: The Animated Series	2010 - 2015	
Merrie Melodies	2013 - 2015	
The Bugs Bunny and Tweety Show	2007 - 2015	
The Porky Pig Show	2007 - 2009	
The Quick Draw McGraw Show	2008 - 2009	
The Road Runner Show	2007 - 2009	
The Tom & Jerry Show	2007 - 2015	
Tiny Toon Adventures	2013 - 2015	

Live Action Programming
Title	Date(s) run	Note(s)
Batman	2012 - 2015	
Goosebumps	2012 - 2015	

Programs acquired from Cartoon Network (United States)
Title	Date(s) run	Note(s)
Cow and Chicken	2014 - 2015	
Dexter's Laboratory	2014 - 2015	
Johnny Bravo	2014 - 2015	

Programs acquired from Canadian Broadcasting Corporation (CBC)
Title	Date(s) run	Note(s)
Babar	2013 - 2015	
The Raccoons	2007 - 2015	
Fraggle Rock	2008 - 2015	

Programs acquired from Teletoon (Now Cartoon Network Canada)
Title	Date(s) run	Note(s)
For Better or For Worse	2011 - 2015	
Fraggle Rock	2008 - 2015	
The Secret World of Santa Claus	2013 - 2015	

=== Other programming ===
- Alvin and the Chipmunks (2008-2013)
- Beetlejuice (2009 - 2013)
- Bobby's World (2012 - 2015)
- Care Bears (2009 - 2015)
- Casper the Friendly Ghost (2008 - 2009)
- Fantastic Four (2008 - 2009)
- Fat Albert and the Cosby Kids (2007 - 2009)
- Felix the Cat (2011 - 2013)
- For Better or For Worse
- Garfield and Friends (2011 - 2015)
- G.I. Joe (2008 - 2009)
- Gumby (2014 - 2015)
- He-Man and the Masters of the Universe (2010 - 2015)
- Inspector Gadget (2008 - 2013)
- Jem and the Holograms (2011 - 2015)
- Mighty Morphin Power Rangers (2011 - 2012)
- My Pet Monster (2011 - 2015)
- Ned's Newt (2012 - 2015)
- ReBoot (2008 - 2015)
- She-Ra: Princess of Power (2010 - 2013)
- Super Friends (2008 - 2011)
- Spider-Man (2008 - 2013)
- The Adventures of Rocky and Bullwinkle and Friends (2009-2013)
- Stop the Smoggies (2011 - 2015)
- Teenage Mutant Ninja Turtles (2012 - 2015)
- The Adventures of Tintin (2011 - 2015)
- The Berenstain Bears (2013-2015)
- The Little Lulu Show (2011 - 2013)
- The Mighty Hercules (2012 - 2015)
- The New Adventures of Batman (2008 - 2009)
- The New Adventures of Superman (2008 - 2009)
- The Pink Panther Show (2009 - 2013)
- The Real Ghostbusters (2008 - 2013)
- The Transformers (2009 - 2013)
- The Woody Woodpecker Show (2007 - 2009)
- Thundercats (2009 - 2015)
