= Spider-Man (1978 film) =

1978 Japanese film

- Pamphlet for the Summer 1978 Toei Cartoon Festival, where Spider-Man premiered.
- Directed by: Kōichi Takemoto
- Written by: Susumu Takaku
- Story by: Saburo Yatsude
- Based on: Spider-Man by: Stan Lee; Steve Ditko
- Produced by: Susumu Yoshikawa
- Starring: Shinji Tōdō; Noboru Nakaya; Mitsuo Andō; Yukie Kagawa
- Music by: Michiaki Watanabe
- Production company: Toei Company
- Distributed by: Toei Company
- Release date: July 22, 1978
- Running time: 24 minutes
- Country: Japan
- Language: Japanese

Spider-Man (Japanese: スパイダーマン, Hepburn: Supaidāman), also referred to as Japanese Spider-Man, is a 1978 Japanese superhero film based on the Marvel Comics character Spider-Man and also a spin-off from the Japanese Spider-Man television series. The film was directed by Kōichi Takemoto, written by Susumu Takahisa, and produced and distributed by Toei Company.

== Plot ==
The film takes place between episode 10 ("To the Flaming Hell: See the Tears of the Snake Woman") and 11 ("Professor Monster's Ultra Poisoning").

The Iron Cross Army is sabotaging oil tankers with the help of their monster, the Sea-Devil, a semi-mechanical anthropomorphic swordfish with an ability to shoot torpedoes from its mouth. Spider-Man employs the help of the Interpol agent Jūzō Mamiya to help him stop the Iron Cross Army. Spider-Man uses his remote-controlled Marveller to prevent the Sea-Devil from bombing an industrial complex by making its missiles explode in the air. After that the monster's master makes it grow giant and Spider-Man has to use his Marveller to transform into a giant mech to fight the monster, after they exchange blows Spider-Man uses the mechs giant sword to disintegrate the Sea-Devil.

== Cast ==
- Shinji Todō as Takuya Yamashiro/Spider-Man
- Noboru Nakaya as Jūzō Mamiya

== Production ==
The film was directed by Kōichi Takemoto and written by Susumu Takaku. The movie was the first appearance of the character of Juzo Mamiya, who subsequently appeared in three episodes of the series, episodes 11, 12 and 14. The film is the same length as the series episodes but was shot in widescreen.

The stunts in the film were choreographed and the acrobatics performed by the Japan Action Club (JAC).

== Release ==
The film premiered at the Toei Manga Matsuri film festival on July 22, 1978. It was released in some non-American territories. (Note: Character-Based Film Series Part 3; page 177) The film was also released on DVD along with the entire series in 2005 in Japan. Like the rest of the series, the film was made available for streaming on Marvel's official website in 2009, with the film specifically being added Dec 24, 2009. The movie appeared listed as "episode 0" on the site. Both the film and episodes were later taken down.

== See also ==
- Spider-Man in film
- List of films featuring giant monsters
