= Encounters on a Dark Night =

1894 Japanese short story

- Short story by Ichiyō Higuchi
- Original title: Yamiyo
- Translator: Robert Lyons Danly (1981)
- Language: Japanese

Publication
- Published in: Bungakukai
- Publication type: Magazine
- Publication date: 1894
- Publication place: Japan
- Published in English: 1981
- Media type: Print

Encounters on a Dark Night (Japanese: やみ夜, Hepburn: Yamiyo) is a short story by Japanese writer Ichiyō Higuchi first published in 1894. It follows the encounter of a young woman, Oran, with social outcast Naojirō, who discover that both had been treated contemptuously by the same man.

== Plot ==
Oran, a lonely young woman, lives with servant couple Sasuke and Osoyo in a derelict house surrounded by a garden wall. One night, a teenage boy is hit by a rickshaw in front of the entrance and carelessly left behind by the driver and his passenger. Sasuke takes the unconscious boy in, and he, his wife and Oran see to his recovery. Their guest is nineteen-year-old orphan Naojirō, whose anger and mistrust led him to a life as a social outcast. Naojirō eventually recovers and falls in love with his caring host. Oran tells him that she had been left by her fiancé after her father Matsukawa's suicide, following failed business transactions. When Naojirō finds out that Oran's unfaithful fiancé and the passenger of the rickshaw which hit him are the same man, diet member Namizaki, he vows to kill him. Oran encourages him in his plan, but Naojirō fails, only slightly hurting Namizaki. The boy disappears without a trace, and his fate remains unclear, as does the fate of Oran and her servants. A few months later, new residents seem to have moved into the Matsukawa house.

== Publication history and legacy ==
Encounters on a Dark Night appeared in three installments between July and November 1894 in Bungakukai magazine. For literary historian Yukiko Tanaka, it ranks, together with On the Last Day of the Year, as the first of "several important pieces of fiction" by the writer. Higuchi biographer and translator Robert Lyons Danly called it an ambitious, "involuted and extremely literary work" with "a gothic flavor to it". Both Tanaka and Danly pointed out the parallels to Higuchi's biography, who after her father's death had been left by her fiancé, Saburō Shibuya, who later became a prosecutor, a judge, and the governor of Akita Prefecture. Danly even saw Encounters on a Dark Night as Higuchi's exploration of her desire for revenge against her father's former business partners.

== Translations ==
Encounters on a Dark Night was translated into English by Robert Lyons Danly in 1981. A translation into German appeared in 2007.
