= On the Last Day of the Year =

1894 Japanese short story

- Short story by Ichiyō Higuchi
- Original title: Ōtsugomori
- Translator: Tei Fujiu (1903); Robert Lyons Danly (1981)
- Country: Japan
- Language: Japanese

Publication
- Published in: Bungakukai
- Publication type: Magazine
- Media type: Print
- Publication date: 1894
- Published in English: 1903, 1981

On the Last Day of the Year (Japanese: 大つごもり, Hepburn: Ōtsugomori) is a short story by Japanese writer Ichiyō Higuchi first published in 1894. It tells the story of a young housemaid, Omine, who steals money from her employers to help a sick relative.

== Plot ==
Omine works as a maid in the strict household of Mrs. Yamamura, the rigid wife of a wealthy Tokyo businessman. On her day off shortly before New Year's Eve, she pays a visit to her uncle Yasubei, who raised Omine after the death of her parents. Yasubei has fallen ill and was forced to close down his food store and move into a smaller flat with his family. He begs Omine to keep her job, which she contemplated quitting, and asks her to lend him money, as he is indebted to a loan shark whom he must pay on the thirty-first of the month. Also, he wants to buy some traditional New Year's rice cakes for his little son Sannosuke. Omine agrees to help, announcing that she will ask Mrs. Yamamura either for a loan or an advance on her salary, and tells Yasubei to send Sannosuke at noon on the thirty-first to collect the money.

On the thirty-first, Ishinosuke, Mr. Yamamura's careless son from a previous marriage, shows up at his parents' house after a drunken night out, to the consternation of the other family members. Omine reminds Mrs. Yamamura of the advance she had been willing to pay, but her employer pretends not to remember having made such an offer. Out of desperation, Omine steals two yen from a drawer and gives it to the waiting Sannosuke. Knowing that the money in the household will be counted on this last evening of the year, she fears the moment her embezzlement will be revealed, and even contemplates suicide. Fortunately, Ishinosuke has taken the remaining money from the drawer, thus obliterating all traces of Omine's misdemeanour. Omine speculates if Ishinosuke's action was by pure chance and simply for his own purposes, or if he had witnessed her theft and taken the remaining money to protect her.

== Publication history ==
On the Last Day of the Year first appeared in the December 1894 edition of Bungakukai magazine and was reprinted in Tayo magazine in 1896. Generally regarded today as "the first of a series of masterpieces" from Higuchi, according to her biographer Timothy J. Van Compernolle, it initially met with little attention and some unfavourable reviews. Biographer and translator Robert Lyons Danly points out a bleak tone and new realism missing in many of her earlier stories.

== Translations ==
On the Last Day of the Year was translated into English in 1903 by Tei Fujiu as The Last Day of the Year in the anthology Hanakatsura: The Works of Famous Literary Women in Japan, and again in 1981 by Robert Lyons Danly.

== Adaptations ==
An anthology film, An Inlet of Muddy Water, was made in 1953 by Tadashi Imai, based on Higuchi's short stories The Thirteenth Night (Japanese: 十三夜, Hepburn: Jusan'ya), On the Last Day of the Year and Nigorie (Japanese: にごり江), which won numerous national film prizes. It was also adapted for Japanese television in 1959.

== Bibliography ==
- Hanakatsura: The Works of Famous Literary Women in Japan. Translated by Fujiu, Tei. Tokyo: Ikuseika. 1903.
