= Rika Miura =

Japanese actress. (born 1958)

Yasuyo Hayashima (早島 康代, Hayashima Yasuyo; born November 15, 1958), known professionally as Rika Miura (三浦 リカ, Miura Rika), is a Japanese actress. She played the love interest of Takuya Yamashiro / Spider-Man, Hitomi Sakuma, in Spider-Man (1978-1979), and the lead role in Battle Fever J (1979-1980), and Toki o Kakeru Shōjo (1985).

== Biography ==
Miura was born in Iwaizumi, Iwate and moved to Saitama Prefecture as a child. Her older sister, Mayumi Miura, is also an actress. She graduated from Tokyo Metropolitan Yoyogi High School.

Miura earned money as a child model, and made her debut in television commercials advertising Kirin Lemon, a soft drink, in 1974, as the product's fourth image girl. Her first lead role was in Sachiko no Shiawase. Since then, Miura has appeared eight times as a guest star on the jidaigeki Mito Kōmon, more than any other woman. Other jidaigeki appearances include Tōyama no Kin-san, two versions of the Hissatsu series, Shadow Warriors and -IV, the live-action show Sabu to Ichi Torimono Hikae, Abarenbō Shōgun, and Ōoka Echizen.

She has also had roles in modern and fantasy drama including G-Men '75 and '82, the lead actress in the tokusatsu version of Spider-Man, Battle Fever J, and the 1985 television show Toki o Kakeru Shōjo. A celebrity, Miura has appeared on variety and travel programs too. In addition to film and television, she has acted on stage.

Miura is married to actor Daijirō Tsutsumi, who regularly portrays the shōgun Tokugawa Tsunayoshi on Mito Kōmon.
