= Miyake Kaho =

Japanese novelist

Kaho Miyake
- 三宅花圃
- Born: Tatsuko Tanabe; 4 February 1868; Edo, Japan
- Died: 18 July 1943 (aged 75)
- Education: Tokyo Women's Normal School (now Ochanomizu University)
- Occupations: Novelist, essayist, poet
- Writing career
- Language: Japanese
- Period: Meiji
- Notable work: Yabu no uguisu (藪の鶯)

Tatsuko Miyake (三宅 竜子, Miyake Tatsuko, née Tanabe, 4 February 1868 − 18 July 1943), known by her pen name Kaho Miyake (三宅 花圃, Miyake Kaho), was a Japanese novelist, essayist, and poet. She has long been associated with joryū bungaku ("women's literature"), acknowledged as the first woman to have written in the modern period. Her most notable work is Yabu no uguisu (藪の鶯, lit. "Warbler in the Grove"), published in 1888.

== Biography ==
Miyake was born Tatsuko Tanabe in Edo (renamed Tokyo the same year) as the oldest daughter of government official Taichi Tanabe. An attendant of Tokyo Women's Normal School (now Ochanomizu University), she also studied with female poet Utako Nakajima (1841−1903) at Nakajima's private school titled Haginoya. The success of Miyake's Yabu no uguisu, published before her graduate, motivated Haginoya fellow student Ichiyō Higuchi to become a professional writer herself.

In 1892, Miyake married philosopher and journalist Setsurei Miyake. She continued to write short stories and essays. In 1920, Miyake and her husband published Josei nihonjin ("Japanese Women"), a magazine on women's issues.
