= Spider-Man in television =

Marvel Comics character Spider-Man in television

The Marvel superhero character of Spider-Man has appeared in multiple forms of media besides the comics, including on television numerous times, in both live action and animated television programs.

== Live-action ==
=== Spidey Super Stories (1974–1977) ===
The character was first portrayed in live-action by Danny Seagren in Spidey Super Stories, an Electric Company segment which ran from 1974 to 1977, with tie-in media seeing Hattie Winston's Valerie the Librarian become Spider-Woman.

=== The Amazing Spider-Man (1977–1979) ===
In 1977, a short-lived live action television series was produced called The Amazing Spider-Man, starring Nicholas Hammond, one of the actors from The Sound of Music, in the title role. Although the series earned good ratings, the CBS Television Network canceled it after just two seasons, along with Wonder Woman, to avoid being labeled as "the superhero network." The series was broadcast only sporadically during the second season. Several episodes from this series were turned into full-length motion pictures outside the U.S. Three films were released overseas: Spider-Man in 1977, Spider-Man Strikes Back in 1978, and Spider-Man: The Dragon's Challenge in 1981, all compiling television film edits of multi-part episodes.

=== Spider-Man (1978–1979) ===
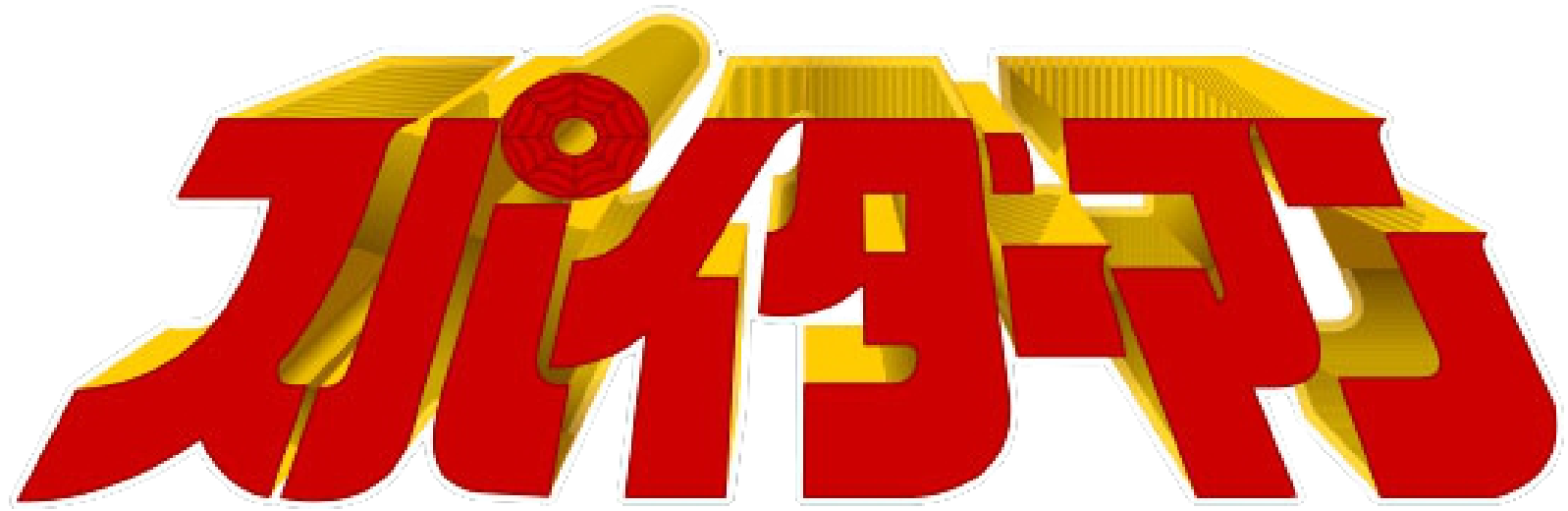
logo for Japanese Spider-Man

In 1978, a Spider-Man live-action tokusatsu series was produced for Japanese television by Toei Company. Due to a request by Bandai that the show include giant robots and vehicles, it was not a faithful adaptation: instead of Peter Parker, Spider-Man is Takuya Yamashiro (山城拓也, Yamashiro Takuya). The show is not related to Ryoichi Ikegami's earlier 1970 Spider-Man manga. Toei planned to follow the series with a new show starring Captain Japan, a Japanese counterpart of Captain America called, but the show was modified and became Battle Fever J, the first official installment of Toei's Super Sentai franchise (barring the retroactive recognition of Himitsu Sentai Gorenger and JAKQ Dengekitai in later years). Having costumed superheroes pilot giant robots began in this Spider-Man series, was carried over to Battle Fever J, and became a tradition in the Super Sentai franchise.

=== Spider-Noir (2026) ===
A live action Spider-Man Noir series was released for MGM+. Nicolas Cage stars as the titular character, as a different version of his character from Spider-Man: Into the Spider-Verse (2018). The series premiered in its entirety in the United States on MGM+ on May 25, 2026, and was released globally, including in the United States, on May 27 on Prime Video, consisting of eight episodes.

== Animation ==
Series	Season	Episodes		Originally released		Head writer(s)	Director(s)	Network
Series	Season	Episodes		First released	Last released	Head writer(s)	Director(s)	Network
Spider-Man	1	20		September 9, 1967	January 20, 1968	Grant Simmons, Clyde Geronimi, & Sid Marcus (season 1); Ralph Bakshi (season 2)	—N/a	ABC
Spider-Man	2	19		September 14, 1968	January 18, 1969	Grant Simmons, Clyde Geronimi, & Sid Marcus (season 1); Ralph Bakshi (season 2)	—N/a	ABC
Spider-Man	3	13		March 22, 1970	June 14, 1970	Grant Simmons, Clyde Geronimi, & Sid Marcus (season 1); Ralph Bakshi (season 2)	—N/a	ABC
Spider-Man	1	26		September 12, 1981	March 30, 1982	Various	—N/a	Syndication
Spider-Man and His Amazing Friends	1	13		September 12, 1981	December 5, 1981	Various	Don Jurwich	NBC
Spider-Man and His Amazing Friends	2	3		September 18, 1982	October 2, 1982	Various	Don Jurwich	NBC
Spider-Man and His Amazing Friends	3	8		September 17, 1983	November 5, 1983	Various	Don Jurwich	NBC
Spider-Man: The Animated Series	1	13		November 19, 1994	June 11, 1995	John Semper Jr.	—N/a	Fox Kids
Spider-Man: The Animated Series	2	14		September 9, 1995	February 24, 1996	John Semper Jr.	—N/a	Fox Kids
Spider-Man: The Animated Series	3	14		April 27, 1996	November 23, 1996	John Semper Jr.	—N/a	Fox Kids
Spider-Man: The Animated Series	4	11		February 1, 1997	August 2, 1997	John Semper Jr.	—N/a	Fox Kids
Spider-Man: The Animated Series	5	13		September 12, 1997	January 31, 1998	John Semper Jr.	—N/a	Fox Kids
Spider-Man Unlimited	1	13	3	October 2, 1999	October 16, 1999	Michael Reaves (1–6); Robert Gregory Browne & Larry Brody (7–13)	Patrick Archibald	Fox Kids
Spider-Man Unlimited	1	13	10	December 23, 2000	March 31, 2001	Michael Reaves (1–6); Robert Gregory Browne & Larry Brody (7–13)	Patrick Archibald	Fox Kids
Spider-Man: The New Animated Series	1	13		July 11, 2003	September 12, 2003	Various	Various	MTV
The Spectacular Spider-Man	1	13		March 8, 2008	June 14, 2008	Greg Weisman	—N/a	The CW
The Spectacular Spider-Man	2	13		June 22, 2009	November 18, 2009	Greg Weisman	—N/a	Disney XD
Ultimate Spider-Man	1	26		April 1, 2012	October 28, 2012	Brian Michael Bendis; Paul Dini	Various	Disney XD
Ultimate Spider-Man	2	26		January 21, 2013	November 21, 2013	Brian Michael Bendis; Paul Dini	Various	Disney XD
Ultimate Spider-Man	3	26		May 13, 2014	October 7, 2015	Brian Michael Bendis; Paul Dini	Various	Disney XD
Ultimate Spider-Man	4	26		February 21, 2016	January 7, 2017	Brian Michael Bendis; Paul Dini	Various	Disney XD
Spider-Man	Origin Shorts	6		June 28, 2017	July 29, 2017	Kevin Shinick	Various	Disney XD
Spider-Man	1	26		August 19, 2017	February 18, 2018	Kevin Shinick	Various	Disney XD
Spider-Man	2	26		June 18, 2018	December 1, 2019	Kevin Shinick	Various	Disney XD
Spider-Man	3	6		April 19, 2020	October 25, 2020	Kevin Shinick	Various	Disney XD
Spidey and His Amazing Friends	1	25		August 6, 2021	July 8, 2022	Becca Topol	Darren Bachynski (season 1–2); Mitch Stookey (season 3–present)	Disney Jr.
Spidey and His Amazing Friends	2	29		August 19, 2022	November 10, 2023	Becca Topol	Darren Bachynski (season 1–2); Mitch Stookey (season 3–present)	Disney Jr.
Spidey and His Amazing Friends	3	30		January 8, 2024	April 11, 2025	Becca Topol	Darren Bachynski (season 1–2); Mitch Stookey (season 3–present)	Disney Jr.
Spidey and His Amazing Friends	4	19		June 16, 2025	May 1, 2026	Becca Topol	Darren Bachynski (season 1–2); Mitch Stookey (season 3–present)	Disney Jr.
Spidey and His Amazing Friends	5	TBA		July 13, 2026	TBA	Becca Topol	Darren Bachynski (season 1–2); Mitch Stookey (season 3–present)	Disney Jr.
Spidey and His Amazing Friends	6	TBA		TBA	TBA	Becca Topol	Darren Bachynski (season 1–2); Mitch Stookey (season 3–present)	Disney Jr.
Your Friendly Neighborhood Spider-Man	1	10		January 29, 2025	February 19, 2025	Jeff Trammell (Note: Trammell is also the series' head writer and was referred to as both showrunner and head writer by Marvel.com.)	Mel Zwyer, Liza Singer, and Stu Livingston	Disney+
Your Friendly Neighborhood Spider-Man	2	TBA		TBA	TBA	Jeff Trammell	TBA	Disney+
Your Friendly Neighborhood Spider-Man	3	TBA		TBA	TBA	Jeff Trammell	TBA	Disney+

=== Spider-Man (1967–1970) ===
The first Spider-Man animated series was simply titled Spider-Man, and ran on ABC from 1967 to 1970. The show's first season was produced by Grantray-Lawrence Animation, which soon went bankrupt. In 1968, animator Ralph Bakshi took over. Bakshi's episodes, which suffered from extremely low budgets, were stylized and featured dark ominous settings and pervasive background music. One episode reused complete background animation, characters, and storyline from an episode of Rocket Robin Hood. The series is best remembered for its theme song, having become one of the most identifiable aspects of the Spider-Man character. In the early 2010s, several internet memes gained major prominence across various platforms, using the simplistic art style and awkward situation of the series for comedic purposes. Spider-Man was voiced by Paul Soles.

=== Spider-Man (1981–1982) ===
In 1981, with the creation of the animation studio Marvel Productions Ltd., Marvel endeavored to translate more of their comic characters to television. To garner the attention of the major networks, Marvel first created a new syndicated Spider-Man series partially based on the 1960s show. The strategy worked, and NBC became interested in having their own Spider-Man series. Spider-Man was voiced by Ted Schwartz.

=== Spider-Man and His Amazing Friends (1981–1983) ===
Spider-Man and His Amazing Friends was created for NBC and featured the trio of Spider-Man, Iceman of the X-Men, and original character Firestar. Actor Dan Gilvezan gave voice to this incarnation of the wall-crawler. This series also featured a number of Marvel guest stars, and shared many of its character designs with the solo Spider-Man show produced just before it.

=== Spider-Man: The Animated Series (1994–1998) ===
The 1994 Spider-Man animated series was made for the Fox Network, with Christopher Daniel Barnes voicing Spider-Man. This series had a bigger budget and used a novel system of one large story arc per season, developed by John Semper. As a result, each of the individual 65 episodes (starting with season 2) were called "chapters". This was the longest Spider-Man series, with 65 episodes in five seasons, until 2012's Ultimate Spider-Man surpassed it.

=== Spider-Man Unlimited (1999–2001) ===
In 1999, an animated series named Spider-Man Unlimited was developed for Fox in which Spider-Man is transported to an animated Counter-Earth inspired by the one created by the High Evolutionary in early 1970s comics. This series was cancelled after one season. Spider-Man was voiced by Rino Romano.

=== Spider-Man: The New Animated Series (2003) ===
In 2003, another television series adaptation, Spider-Man: The New Animated Series this time using computer animation was produced by Mainframe Entertainment for Sony Pictures Television and broadcast on MTV; it featured characters and continuity from the 2002 Spider-Man film, as well as Michael Clarke Duncan voicing the Kingpin, reprising his role from the 2003 live action Daredevil film adaptation. The show lasted only one season, which contained 13 episodes. Spider-Man was voiced by Neil Patrick Harris.

=== The Spectacular Spider-Man (2008–2009) ===
This television series is based on the early Lee/Ditko and Romita eras of The Amazing Spider-Man in addition to drawing elements from other eras of the comics, the Ultimate Spider-Man comics by Brian Michael Bendis and Mark Bagley, and Sam Raimi's Spider-Man film series. Peter Parker is still a teenager living in contemporary New York, as in Bendis' Ultimate version, but many of the cast members borrow from both the early and later years of Spider-Man comics. Many of the original supporting cast, including Flash Thompson, have been translated into modern terms but are still very true to the comics, and some have altered ethnicities: Liz Allan is Hispanic and Ned Lee (formerly "Leeds") is Korean. The series follows several plot arcs drawn from the comics. Two seasons of the series were aired, each containing 13 episodes, but originally a total of 65 episodes along with several direct-to-video films were planned. However, the series ended prematurely when Sony Pictures relinquished its rights, which it had licensed from Marvel, to produce animated works using Spider-Man and associated characters. Spider-Man was voiced by Josh Keaton.

=== Ultimate Spider-Man (2012–2017) ===
Spider-Man appears in Ultimate Spider-Man, voiced again by Drake Bell. This version is a member of S.H.I.E.L.D. and the leader of a group of trainees consisting of Iron Fist, Nova, Luke Cage and White Tiger.

=== Spider-Man (2017–2020) ===
Spider-Man features Spider-Man (voiced by Robbie Daymond) teaming up with Miles Morales as Spider-Man II / Spy-D, Gwen Stacy as Spider-Gwen / Ghost Spider, and Anya Corazon as Spider-Girl.

=== Spidey and His Amazing Friends (2021–present) ===
A children's television series titled Spidey and His Amazing Friends premiered on August 6, 2021 on Disney Junior. Peter Parker / Spidey is voiced initially by Benjamin Valic and by Alkaio Thiele from the third season onward.

=== Your Friendly Neighborhood Spider-Man (2025–present) ===
Your Friendly Neighborhood Spider-Man explores Peter Parker's origin story and early days using the Spider-Man persona. It is produced by Marvel Studios for Disney+, part of the Marvel Cinematic Universe (MCU) franchise, and takes place in an alternate timeline from the MCU in which Norman Osborn meets and mentors Parker in place of Tony Stark in the films Captain America: Civil War (2016) and Spider-Man: Homecoming (2017). The series features a style that is intended to "celebrate" and pay homage to the early The Amazing Spider-Man comic books. Hudson Thames reprises his role as Spider-Man after appearing in the animated Marvel Studios anthology series What If...?. The series debuted on the streaming service Disney+ in 2025, with a second and third season in development.

== Appearances in other series ==
- Spider-Man guest-starred in the Spider-Woman television series in the episodes "Pyramids of Terror" and "The Kongo Spider", voiced again by Paul Soles.
- In an episode of the Marvel Productions-produced animated series Muppet Babies, "Comic Capers", Spider-Man appears in a fantasy sequence the characters create that is inspired by The Amazing Spider-Man newspaper comic strip.
- Spider-Man makes a non-speaking cameo appearance in the X-Men: The Animated Series episode "The Phoenix Saga – Part V: Child Of Light".
- Peter Parker appears in the Fantastic Four: World's Greatest Heroes episode "Frightful", voiced by Sam Vincent. Johnny Storm hires him to take publicity stills of the Fantastic Four to maintain their reputation as heroes following the emergence of their counterparts, the Frightful Four. His appearance is uncredited as Sony Pictures owned the animated television rights to the character while the series was airing which prevented mention of his name and being established as Spider-Man.
- Spider-Man appears in The Avengers: Earth's Mightiest Heroes, voiced again by Drake Bell. Originally, Josh Keaton was intended to reprise his role from The Spectacular Spider-Man and had even recorded dialogue for the character, but was ultimately replaced and redubbed by Bell. Tasked as Peter Parker to take pictures for an interview with Captain America, whom he admires, he works with him to save civilians from the Serpent Society. Spider-Man reappears in the episode "New Avengers", as a member of the titular group. Later, he joins the Avengers as a reserve member. Spider-Man returns in the series finale "Avengers Assemble", aiding the Avengers in a battle against Galactus.
- Spider-Man appears in Marvel Disk Wars: The Avengers, voiced by Shinji Kawada in Japanese and Robbie Daymond in English.
- Spider-Man appears in Marvel Future Avengers, with Shinji Kawada and Robbie Daymond reprising their roles in Japanese and English dubbed versions from Marvel Disk Wars: The Avengers and the Spider-Man TV series and various Marvel media respectively.
- Hudson Thames voices Peter Parker / Spider-Man in the Marvel Cinematic Universe television series What If...? episode "What If... Zombies?!". Tom Holland, who portrays the character in the live-action films, could not reprise his role due to contractual conflicts regarding Sony Pictures.
- The 1994 series' iteration of Spider-Man makes non-speaking cameo appearances in the X-Men '97 three-part season finale "Tolerance is Extinction". In Part 1, he is among the witnesses to the electromagnetic pulse (EMP) wave sent throughout the world by Magneto to depower the Prime Sentinels upon escaping from Bastion's captivity. In Part 3, Parker is at an electronics store watching the news of Asteroid M's impending collision with Earth alongside Flash Thompson and Mary Jane Watson, who he has brought back to the present timeline.
- Spider-Man appears in Marvel Zombies which serves as a continuation for the storyline of the What If...? episode "What If... Zombies?!" in which he also appeared in, voiced again by Hudson Thames.

=== Marvel Animated Universe ===
- Spider-Man appears in Avengers Assemble, with Drake Bell reprising his role (excluding the episode "Vibranium Curtain" Pt. 2, where Robbie Daymond reprises the role). In "Hulk's Day Out", he is selling hot dogs. In "Avengers Disassembled", Spider-Man temporarily joins the Avengers as Captain America's replacement, but leaves the team near the end of the episode due to Captain America and Iron Man being unable to work together. In "Avengers Underground", Spider-Man is among the heroes the Squadron Supreme imprison, although in his case, he is occupied with one of their drones. In "Avengers World", Spider-Man appears at the end of the episode on a holographic globe as one of the heroes Iron Man and Captain America consider potential Avengers. Finally in "Vibranium Curtain" Pt. 2, Spider-Man shows up and works with Black Panther to fight Vulture.
- Spider-Man appears in Hulk and the Agents of S.M.A.S.H., voiced again by Drake Bell.
- Spider-Man appears in Guardians of the Galaxy, voiced by Robbie Daymond.

=== Television specials ===
- Spider-Man appears in Phineas and Ferb: Mission Marvel, voiced again by Drake Bell.
- Spider-Man appears in Lego Marvel Super Heroes: Maximum Overload, voiced by Drake Bell.
- Spider-Man appears in Lego Marvel Super Heroes: Avengers Reassembled, voiced again by Benjamin Diskin.
- Spider-Man appears in Lego Marvel Spider-Man: Vexxed by Venom, voiced again by Robbie Daymond.
- Spider-Man appears in Lego Marvel Avengers: Climate Conundrum, voiced by Cole Howard.

=== Mentions within Marvel animated series ===
- In the Iron Man animated series, when a hacker causes H.O.M.E.R., the Starks' artificial intelligence, to malfunction, he mentions Peter Parker.
- A small reference is made to Spider-Man in the X-Men: Evolution episode "On Angel's Wings", when Angel is seen reading the Daily Bugle, the place Spider-Man/Peter Parker usually works.
- Spider-Man is referenced several times in the animated series The Super Hero Squad Show. In the episode "Election of Evil", the Mayor of Superhero City (voiced by Stan Lee, one of the character's creators) references Spider-Man by saying that he tried to get superpowers by "getting bitten by a radioactive bug", and his campaign motto is "With great responsibility comes great power... and vice-versa". Spider-Man did not physically appear in the series as Sony Pictures owned the character's animated television rights while it was airing.
- In Iron Man: Armored Adventures, Spider-Man is alluded to. In "Iron Man 2099", a Maggia goon mistakes Hawkeye for Spider-Man after Hawkeye uses a web arrow to catch one of his cohorts.

=== Mentions within Marvel Cinematic Universe series ===
- In a flashback during season 1 of Daredevil to Matt and Foggy's time at Landman & Zack, Foggy mentions having "bumped into Morales", referring to Rio Morales, the mother of Miles Morales. In the 12th episode of Daredevil season 1, when Ben Urich is taking a drink from his glass and right before he realizes Wilson Fisk is there, a photograph of Spider-Man is visible in the newspaper posted on his pin-board to the far right of the center-top. In the 12th episode of season 3, when Karen Page is visiting a boxing gym, an old poster behind her advertises a fight between a "Parker" and a "Morales".
- In the 12th episode of Jessica Jones season 1, Spider-Man-themed ice pops are shown to be on sale when Jessica is tailing a Kilgrave-controlled courier through Central Park.
- At the end of the fourth episode of Iron Fist season 1, Ward Meachum compares Danny Rand's scaling of a building to "goddamned Daredevil" in the original release. In the Italian and German dubs of the show, Ward compares Danny to "goddamned Spider-Man".
- In the final episode of The Defenders, when Danny Rand unleashes his Iron Fist upon Madame Gao, the action is immediately accompanied by the Wu Tang Clan's song "Protect Ya Neck". The section of the song heard in the fight scene speaks of "Swingin' through your town like your neighborhood Spider-Man".
- In the Disney+ series Daredevil: Born Again, when Wilson Fisk had become Mayor of New York, he called out a couple of street level heroes, including Spider-Man as a "man who dresses in a spider outfit".

=== Miscellaneous ===
- Spider-Man guest-starred in the Adult Swim television series Robot Chicken in the sketches "Bloopers! Two", "Superheroes Tonight", "Goblin Aerobics", "Kid Venison", "Spider Sense", "Excelsior", "Spidey in the Bathroom", "April's Report on Town Hall", "J. Jonah Jameson's True Love", and "Nick Fury Kills Everybody", voiced by Seth Green and Andy Richter.
- A character named Agent Spider makes a minor appearance in the Invincible episode "I Thought You Were Stronger" voiced by Josh Keaton, depicted as a superhero from an alternate dimension encountered by Mark Grayson / Invincible during his multiverse-spanning fight with Angstrom Levy. For legal reasons, the character is a substitute for Spider-Man's role in Marvel Team-Up vol. 3 #14 (November 2005), during which Invincible ended up in the Marvel Universe under similar circumstances and helped Spider-Man fight Doctor Octopus. The latter is also implied in the episode through the stand-in character Prof. Ock, voiced by Chris Diamantopoulos.
