= Takekurabe =

Novella by Ichiyō Higuchi

- Short story by Ichiyō Higuchi
- Translator: W.M. Bickerton (1930); Edward Seidensticker (1956); Seizo Nobunaga; Robert Lyons Danly (1981)
- Language: Japanese

Publication
- Published in: Bungakkai
- Publication type: Magazine
- Publication date: 1895–96
- Publication place: Japan
- Published in English: 1930, 1956, 1981
- Media type: Print

Takekurabe (たけくらべ; lit. "Comparing heights"), English titles including Growing Up and Child's Play, is a novella by Japanese writer Ichiyō Higuchi, first published in 1895–96. It depicts a group of youths growing up in Shitaya Ryūsenji-chō, Yoshiwara, Meiji era Tokyo's red light district, over a span of four months.

== Characters ==
- Midori – a 14-year-old girl whose family lives in the Daikokuya brothel. Her older sister, Ōmaki, works as a popular courtesan. Midori was born in Kishū and does not have direct ties to either of the gangs because her family is not under the protection of the Senzoku Shrine, nor does her family belong to the Ryūgeji temple parish. She is a bright and delightful child who loves to play with her friends. Once she becomes older, she is to follow in her older sister's footsteps and become a courtesan at the Daikokuya brothel.
- Nobuyuki (Nobu) – a 15-year-old boy who is the son of the Ryūgeji temple's Buddhist priest. Nobu is a rather gloomy and introverted boy who is extremely devoted to his studies. He is Ryūgeji's heir but he is at odds with his family because he disagrees with his father's worldly ways and greedy profiteering, and does not intend to become a Buddhist priest.
- Chōkichi – leader of the "Back Street Gang". He is the son of a construction crew foreman. He is a callous, hot-headed, and ill-mannered boy who often looks to pick fights with Shōta. He causes many conflicts in the story.
- Shōta – leader of the "Main Street Gang" and son of the local pawnbroker. Shōta is a well-educated, but often naive and arrogant boy who was orphaned and has been raised by his grandmother. He appears to have grown up faster than all the other children as he takes on many adult responsibilities like collecting interest payments on the loans of clients. He is also Midori's best friend.
- Sangorō – a supporting character in the story. Sangorō is the son of a rickshaw man whose family lives in a house owned by Chōkichi's father. Since Chōkichi's family owns Sangorō's home, Sangorō gets dragged into a lot of Chōkichi's messes.

== Plot ==
The story takes place in the Meiji Restoration period in Tokyo, depicting the lives of a group of youths who live in Daionjimae, a fictional neighbourhood outside of the Yoshiwara red-light district. The story follows the characters Midori, Nobu, Chōkichi, and Shōta as they transition from adolescence into early adulthood. The events of the story are framed by two neighbourhood festivals: the Senzoku Shrine summer festival and the Ōtori Shrine Cock’s Fair (Tori no Ichi) in early winter.

On the eve of the Senzoku Shrine summer festival, Chōkichi, the "Back Street Gang" leader, intends to ambush Shōta, the "Main Street Gang" leader. However, Shōta never appears, and the ensuing brawl results in the beating of one of Shōta’s supporters, Sangorō, and Midori, Shōta’s best friend, being struck on the forehead by Chōkichi’s muddy sandal. Whilst all this chaos is brewing, Midori struggles with her identity and future as she is torn between her own freedom and her family’s wishes for her to become a courtesan like her older sister, Ōmaki. Midori takes an interest in Nobu, who hides his shyness behind dismissive behaviour towards her, which repels her. With Midori being slowly pushed towards becoming a courtesan and being caught in the crossfire of Chōkichi and Shōta’s feud, she finally makes a decision after Chōkichi fires a string of insults at her regarding her family’s background and her future as a “whore.”

The day after the festival, Midori leaves school. When Midori learns that Nobu may be working with Chōkichi, it comes as a huge shock to her because she had not thought that any of her peers were rivals. The flamboyant, lively, and beautiful Midori is too showy for the quiet, introverted Nobu to handle especially while he is dealing with the distasteful consumerism of his parents and sister. The two do not speak again before going their separate ways: Midori to the brothel to become a courtesan, and Nobuyuki to a seminary to train to become a priest, leaving their childhoods behind forever.

== Themes ==
=== Loss of Childhood ===
As can be gathered from the English translations of the story, Growing Up and Child's Play, the story depicts four youths as they transition into early adulthood. Some, like Shōta, take this transition a bit better than others. Except for Nobu, no other youngster in Takekurabe seems to be committed to his studies or has the desire to leave the little universe defined by the Yoshiwara and Daionjimae, the fictional neighbourhood in Takekurabe set just outside the licensed quarter. These characters, like children before the Restoration, never question the sense of inheriting their families' professions and places in society, since the ancient, plebeian Shitamachi area lacked from the beginning any stimuli that promoted hopes of personal growth for them.

=== Societal Pressure on Children ===
Takekurabe demonstrates the societal and familial pressure that is placed on children for them to become successful adults who are able to carry on a legacy. This is best shown through the characters of Midori and Nobu. Midori, who is a pleasant child full of love to play is sadly turned into a quiet woman by the end of the story as her freedom is stripped from her. She gives in to the path laid out before her and decides to become a courtesan like her older sister, despite not wanting to. Similarly, Nobu, who despises the lifestyle of his family, decides to train to become a priest like his father, preparing to take on his role as heir to Ryūgeji temple. Examples of this theme are best seen through the characters being labelled by their parents’ social status or occupations: ‘‘Shōta of the Tanakaya’’; ‘‘Nobuyuki of Ryūgeji’’; ‘‘Chōkichi, the Boss’s son,’’ etc.

== Publication & reception ==
Takekurabe was first published in the literature magazine Bungakkai in seven installments between January 1895 and January 1896. Higuchi's novella was read and commended by eminent literary figures including Mori Ōgai, Kōda Rohan and Saitō Ryokuu, who elevated Ichiyō Higuchi to the status of one of the era's most well-liked authors. It was complimented specifically for its in-depth and vivid account of Yoshiwara's distinctive traditions. The story and its adaptations were frequently utilized as literary works in primary and secondary schools to examine post-war society.

== Translations ==
Takekurabe was translated into English as They Compare Heights by W.M. Bickerton in 1930, as Growing Up by Edward Seidensticker in 1956, and as Child's Play by Robert Lyons Danly in 1981. A translation under the title Teenagers Vying for Tops was provided by Seizo Nobunaga in 1953 or 1960, depending on the source.

== Adaptations ==
=== Film ===
- 1924: Takekurabe, directed by Genjirō Saegusa
- 1955: Takekurabe, directed by Heinosuke Gosho

=== Manga ===
- 1995: Takekurabe, adapted by Takeda Masao

=== Television ===
- Takekurabe was also repeatedly adapted for Japanese television, including a puppet play version and an animated version (released as Growing Up in North America by Central Park Media).

== Bibliography ==
- Van Compernolle, Timothy J. (1996). The Uses of Memory: The Critique of Modernity in the Fiction of Higuchi Ichiyō. Cambridge (MA) and London: Harvard University Press. ISBN 978-0-674-02272-0.
