= Nakajima Utako =

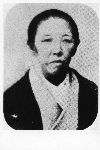
Nakajima Utako

Nakajima Utako (中島 歌子; 14 December 1844, Tokyo – 30 January 1903) was a Japanese waka and tanka poet and conservatory founder. Associated with Keien court poetry, she founded the Haginoya poetry school (萩の舎, "House of Bush Clover"), the most notable of the poetry conservatories during the Meiji period.

== Biography ==
Nakajima Utako was born in 1844 (or 1841), the second daughter of Nakajima Matazaemon (中島又左衛門). Her childhood name was Tose (とせ). As descendants of the statesman, Ōta Dōkan, the builder of Edo Castle, the Nakajimas were known for generations as village leaders. The house of Fukushima (福島), the mother's family, was also a powerful trading house and court supplier of the shōgun. The mother was active in the inner service of Kawagoe Castle and was able to establish close relations with the house of Nabeshima. When Nakajima was 10 years old, she became a maid of honor in the estate of the highest administrative officer of Matsudaira (松平) in Harima Province (in today's Hyōgo Prefecture). At the age of 18, she married a vassal of Mito-han, Hayashi Chūzaemon (林忠左衛門), and moved with him to Mito. But he was seriously injured in 1864, just before the Meiji restoration, and committed suicide. After the Meiji restoration, Nakajima returned to Edo (now Tokyo), where she received an education in waka and calligraphy under Katō Chinami (加藤千浪). As a poet of the old school, she gained prominence. Around the year 1877, she founded the school of Haginoya, where she mainly trained women of the upper and middle class. In total, more than 1,000 graduates attended the school. Among them were Higuchi Ichiyō and Miyake Kaho (三宅花圃). Her works include 近代の女性文学者たち (鎬を削る自己実現の苦闘; Kindai no josei bungakushatachi: shinogi o kezuru jiko jitsugen no kutō), 萩のしつく (中嶋歌子先生遺稿; Hagi no shizuku: Nakajima Utako Sensei ikō), 文学者の手紙. 5 (Bungakusha no tegami. 005), and 早稲穂のかつら (Wasaho no katsura).
