= Noboru Nakaya =

Japanese actor (1929–2006)

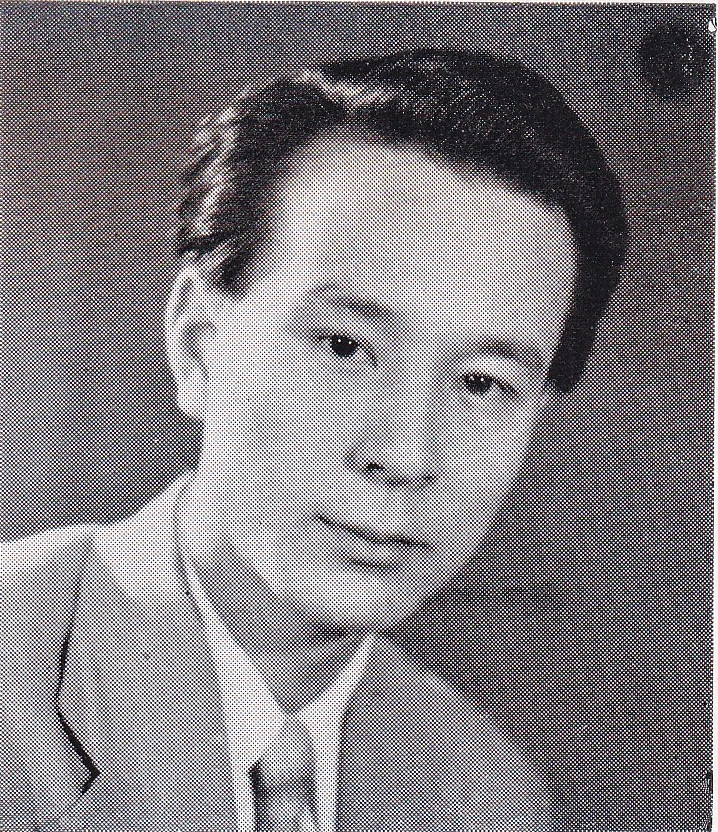
- Nakaya in 1954
- Born: May 4, 1929; Shiba, Tokyo, Empire of Japan
- Died: November 16, 2006 (aged 77); Minato, Tokyo, Japan
- Occupation: Actor
- Years active: 1950–2004
- Spouse: Kyōko Kishida (m. 1954; div. 1978)
- Children: 1

Noboru Nakaya (仲谷 昇, Nakaya Noboru; May 4, 1929 – November 16, 2006) was a Japanese actor. His career spanned over five decades in theater, film, and television, with more than 100 credits. Nakaya was best known internationally for his role as a ghost samurai in Kwaidan (1964), and also appeared in Hitokiri (1969) and Lady Snowblood (1973).

== Biography ==
Nakaya was born on May 4, 1929, in the Takanawa district of Shiba, Tokyo (now part of Minato, Tokyo). He initially enrolled in the Faculty of Law at Chuo University but dropped out to pursue a career in the performing arts. His passion for theater led him to join the Bungakuza Theatre Research Institute in 1950, where he trained as an actor, making his stage debut in Musashino Fujo (1950).

Dissatisfied with the troupe's direction, he departed Bungakuza. In 1975, Nakaya, Hiroshi Akutagawa, Isao Hashizume and Nobuo Nakamura left Gekidan Un to form the Theatrical group EN. Following Akutagawa's death in 1981, Nakaya assumed the role of representative director for both the group and its operating corporation, a position he held until his death. His theatrical contributions earned him a Kazuo Kikuta Theatre Award.

His film debut was An Inlet of Muddy Water in 1953. He soon transitioned into more prominent parts, particularly under the direction of Yasuzō Masumura, with whom he collaborated on several key films in the late 1950s and 1960s. He appeared in several other notable films thereafter. Internationally, Nakaya remains best recognized for his performance as a ghostly samurai in a segment of Masaki Kobayashi's anthology horror epic Kwaidan (1964). He was the subject of one of Andy Warhol's Screen Tests in 1964. Nakaya was married to actress Kyōko Kishida from 1954 until divorcing in 1978. The couple had only one child.

Nakaya was an avid horse racing and baseball enthusiast, also contributing to a serialized column in a horse racing magazine. A devoted fan of the Yomiuri Giants, he served as the ace pitcher of Bungakuza's company baseball team during his time with the troupe. Plagued by chronic respiratory issues, he required an oxygen tank in his dressing room in later years. Following a two-hour television drama appearance in 2004, he experienced repeated hospitalizations. He died on November 16, 2006, at a hospital in Minato, Tokyo, at the age of 77. The cause was chronic obstructive pulmonary disease, a condition exacerbated by years of smoking.

== Selected filmography ==
=== Films ===
- An Inlet of Muddy Water (1953) - debut
- Flowing (1956)
- Times of Joy and Sorrow (1957)
- Her Brother (1960)
- A Wanderer's Notebook (1962)
- Kwaidan (1964)
- Hitokiri (1969)
- Bakumatsu (1970)
- Lady Snowblood (1973)
- The Barren Zone (1976)
- A Tale of Sorrow and Sadness (1977)
- Spider-Man (1978)
- Nihon no Fixer (1979)
- G.I. Samurai (1979)
- Willful Murder (1981)
- Shosetsu Yoshida Gakko (1983), Nobusuke Kishi
- W's Tragedy (1984)
- Love Letter (1985)

=== Television series ===
- Hana no Shōgai (1963)
- Key Hunter (1968-1973)
- Ten to Chi to (1969)
- Kunitori Monogatari (1973), Toki Masayori
- Katsu Kaishū (1974), Takahashi Deishū
- Kaze to Kumo to Niji to (1976), Fujiwara no Tadahira
- Spider-Man (1978-1979)
- Kusa Moeru (1979), Tsuchimikado Michichika
- Dai Sentai Goggle-V (1982-1983)
- MegaBeast Investigator Juspion (1985)
- I'll Never Love Anyone Anymore (1991)
- The Abe Clan (1995)
