= An Inlet of Muddy Water =

1953 Japanese film

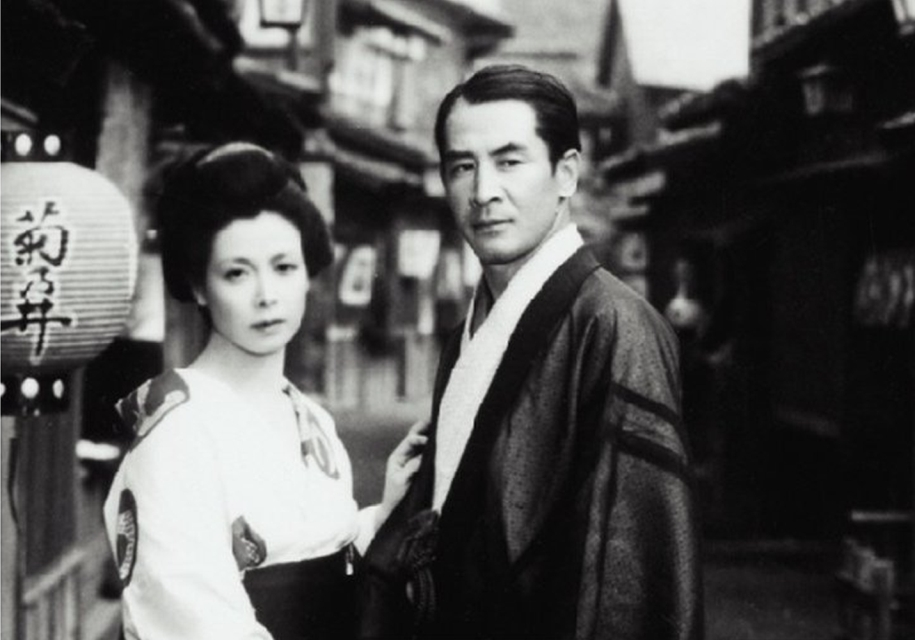
- Chikage Awashima and Sō Yamamura; in the episode "Troubled Waters"
- Kanji: にごりえ
- Directed by: Tadashi Imai
- Written by: Toshirō Ide; Yoko Mizuki
- Based on: Short stories by Ichiyō Higuchi
- Produced by: Takeo Itō; Chieko Yoshida; Shizue Miyamoto
- Starring: Ken Mitsuda; Yoshiko Kuga; Chikage Awashima; So Yamamura; Haruko Sugimura
- Cinematography: Shun'ichirō Nakao
- Music by: Ikuma Dan
- Distributed by: Shochiku
- Release date: 23 November 1953 (Japan)
- Running time: 130 minutes
- Country: Japan
- Language: Japanese

An Inlet of Muddy Water (Japanese: にごりえ, romanized: Nigorie), also titled Muddy Waters, is a 1953 Japanese drama film directed by Tadashi Imai. Based on three short stories by Ichiyō Higuchi, it received numerous national film prizes and is regarded as a major work of Imai by film historians.

== Plot ==
In three episodes, the film portrays the fate of women during the Meiji era:

Episode 1: "The Thirteenth Night": Young wife Seki turns up at her parents' house, announcing that she wants to divorce her abusive husband. Her father talks her into returning to her marital home, as her parents' welfare and the career of her brother depend on the marriage, also reminding her that she will have to leave her young son behind. On her way back home in a rickshaw, she discovers that the driver is Rokunosuke, a childhood friend who never got over their separation. They reminisce their once mutual affection, but part ways without an outlook to meeting again.

Episode 2: "On The Last Day Of The Year": Mine works as a maid in the strict household of Mrs. Yamamura, wife of a wealthy businessman. To help her sick uncle who is in debt, Mine asks her employer to lend her money. Mrs. Yamamura first agrees, but later withdraws her offer. Out of desperation, Mine steals money from a household drawer and gives it to her aunt. Moments before her misdemeanour is revealed, Mrs. Yamamura's carefree son Ishinosuke takes the remaining money to waste it on gambling and drinking, thus obliterating all traces of Mine's theft.

Episode 3: "Troubled Waters": Courtesan O-Riki is the "star" of a brothel in a red light district. To her disapproval, she is still being followed by her impoverished former patron Genshichi who spent all his money on her. O-Riki gets involved with a new client, Asanosuke, but is reluctant to the possible prospect of marriage, citing her profession and her poor upbringing as reasons. Meanwhile, Genshichi forces his wife and little son to leave him due to her constant complaints that he is unable to support the family. Afterwards, he waylays O-Riki, murders her and commits suicide.

== Cast ==
Episode 1: "The Thirteenth Night"

- Ken Mitsuda as Saito Kanae
- Akiko Tamura as Saito Moyo
- Hiro Kumon as Saito Inosuke
- Yatsuko Tanami as Harada Seki
- Hiroshi Akutagawa as Takasaka Rokunosuke

Episode 2: "On The Last Day Of The Year"

- Susumu Tatsuoka as Yamamura Kahee
- Teruko Nagaoka as Yamamura Aya
- Noboru Nakaya as Yamamura Ishinosuke
- Kyōko Kishida as Yamamura Shizuko
- Yoshiko Kuga as Mine
- Nobuo Nakamura as Yasubee
- Michiko Araki as Shin
- Shiro Inui as Minosuke
- Kazuo Kitamura as Rickshaw man

Episode 3: "Troubled Waters"

- Hisao Toake as Tobei
- Yoshie Minami as O-Yae
- Chikage Awashima as O-Riki
- Sō Yamamura as Asanosuke
- Seiji Miyaguchi as Genshichi
- Haruko Sugimura as O-Hatsu
- Maiko Hojo as O-Taka
- Natsuko Kahara

== Release ==
An Inlet of Muddy Water was shown in competition at the 1954 Cannes Film Festival.

== Literary source ==
An Inlet of Muddy Water is based on Ichiyō Higuchi's short stories The Thirteenth Night (Japanese: 十三夜, romanized: Jusan'ya, 1895), On the Last Day of the Year (Japanese: 大つごもり, romanized: Ōtsugomori, 1894), and Troubled Waters (also: Muddy Bay, Japanese: にごり江, romanized: Nigorie, 1895). Other than the film, Higuchi's original story Troubled Waters ends with the discovery of the bodies of O-Riki and Genshichi and the passersby's speculations whether the two committed shinjū (lovers' double suicide) or O-Riki fell victim to a crime, leaving it to the reader to decide.

== Legacy ==
An Inlet of Muddy Water was screened at the Museum of Modern Art in 2022 as part of its "Beyond Ozu: Hidden Gems of Shochiku Studios" retrospective.

== Awards ==
An Inlet of Muddy Water was awarded the Kinema Junpo Award, the Blue Ribbon Award and the Mainichi Film Award for Best Film. Two additional Mainichi Film Awards went to Imai for Best Direction and Haruko Sugimura as Best Supporting Actress (for An Inlet of Muddy Water and Tokyo Story).
