= Nigorie =

- Short story by Ichiyō Higuchi
- Translator: Hisako Tanaka (1958); Seizo Nobunaga; Robert Lyons Danly (1981)
- Language: Japanese

Publication
- Published in: Bungei kurabu
- Publication type: Magazine
- Publication date: 1895
- Publication place: Japan
- Published in English: 1958, 1981
- Media type: Print

Nigorie (Japanese: にごり江, Hepburn: Nigorie), translated into English as Troubled Waters and Muddy Bay, is a short story by Japanese writer Ichiyō Higuchi, written and published in 1895. It depicts the fate of a courtesan in the red light district of a nameless town during the Meiji era.

== Plot ==
Nigorie centers around Oriki, the most popular courtesan at the Kikunoi, a brothel in the red light district of an unspecified town, and a group of people connected to her, during the summer Obon festival.

Through her conversations with other prostitutes and Oriki's accounts in the presence of new customer Yūki Tomonosuke, the reader learns that a previous customer, Genshichi, a futon salesman of moderate affluence, was addicted to Oriki and spent all his money at the brothel. Now that Genshichi has been reduced to the hard labor of a construction worker, forced to move with his wife, Ohatsu, and his young son Takichi into a smaller flat in a run-down section of town, Oriki rejects seeing him despite his pleas.

Tomonosuke repeatedly questions Oriki during his visits. She reminisces about her poor upbringing, which she cites, together with her profession, as the reason for not wanting to marry, although she had contemplated the possibility. She recounts a childhood incident when she was seven years old, sent by her mother to buy rice for supper. On her way back, she slipped on the frozen ground, spilling the rice into the gutter, leaving the family starving for the day.

Meanwhile, Ohatsu scolds Genshichi for his ongoing obsession with Oriki and the family's poverty, which she tries to mitigate by doing piecework. When Takichi comes home with a piece of cake, which he received as a gift from Oriki (whom he refers to as "the demon-lady" (Note: Oni-nēsan (鬼姉さん) in the original, lit. "demon girl". The translation cited here is Robert Lyons Danly's, while Hisako Tanaka uses the term "demon girl". See section "Translations".)), Ohatsu angrily throws it away. Genshichi, furious about her ongoing accusations and behaviour, demands that she leave him. Ohatsu begs him to let her stay, as she has no relatives she can return to, but finally leaves, taking their son with her.

At the end of the festivities, the dead bodies of Oriki and Genshichi are found. While it seems obvious that Genshichi committed suicide by seppuku, the cause of Oriki's death remains unclear. The passersby speculate about her fate; while one assumes a shinjū (double love suicide), another one reasons that the wounds on Oriki's body make a murder after her attempted escape more plausible. It is left to the reader to determine the true circumstances of her death.

== Writing and publishing history ==
Nigorie was written by Higuchi in June–July 1895 and originally delivered to Ōhashi Otowa, the editor of Bungei kurabu magazine, with the final chapter missing. Higuchi sketched six different endings for the story, including one in which Tomonosuke takes Oriki away from the Kikunoi, before she chose the now existing ending, which she sent to Otowa in August. Nigorie was published in the September 1895 edition of Bungei kurabu.

Yoshie Wada, editor of Higuchi's diaries, suggested that the character of Tononusuke was based on novelist Tōsui Nakarai, her mentor and rumoured lover.

== Translations ==
Nigorie was translated into English in 1958 by Hisako Tanaka under the title Muddy Bay and in 1981 by Robert Lyons Danly under the title Troubled Waters. Seizo Nobunaga provided an English translation under the title In the Gutter (publication date 1953 or 1960, depending on the source).

Nigorie was also translated from classical Japanese language, in which all of Higuchi's works are written, into modern Japanese in 1996 by Hiromi Itō.

== Adaptations ==
An anthology film, An Inlet of Muddy Water, was made in 1953 by Tadashi Imai, based on Nigorie and the short stories The Thirteenth Night (Japanese: 十三夜, Hepburn: Jusan'ya), 1895, and On the Last Day of the Year (Japanese: 大つごもり, Hepburn: Ōtsugomori), 1894. It was entered into the 1954 Cannes Film Festival and won numerous national film prizes.

Nigorie has also repeatedly been adapted for Japanese television, including a version directed by Yasushi Sasaki in 1973 starring Ken Ogata.

== Bibliography ==
- Nigorie. Tokyo: Hakubunkan. 20 September 1895. pp. 106–142.
