= Yoshie Wada =

Japanese novelist and critic

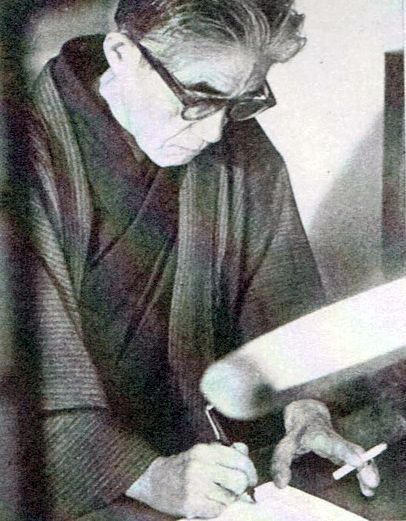
Wada in 1964

Yoshie Wada (和田 芳恵, Wada Yoshie; April 6, 1906 - October 5, 1977) was a Japanese novelist and critic.

Wada was born in Oshamambe, Hokkaidō, and graduated from Chuo University with a law degree. In addition to his novels in the naturalist tradition, he edited the diaries of Ichiyō Higuchi and Fumiko Hayashi. He received one of the 13th Japan Art Academy Prizes (1956) for Diary of Ichiyō Higuchi (一葉の日記, Ichiyō no nikki), the 50th Naoki Prize (1963下) for Chiri no Naka (塵の中), and the 26th Yomiuri Prize (1974) for Tsugiki no dai (接木の台).

== Selected works ==
- Higuchi Ichiyō, Chikuma Shobō, 1954
- Hayashi Fumiko, Chikuma Shobō, 1961
- Aijō no kiroku, Chikuma Shobō, 1969
- Ichiyō tanjō, Gendai Shokan, 1969
