= Ichiyō Higuchi =

Japanese writer (1872–1896)

- 樋口一葉
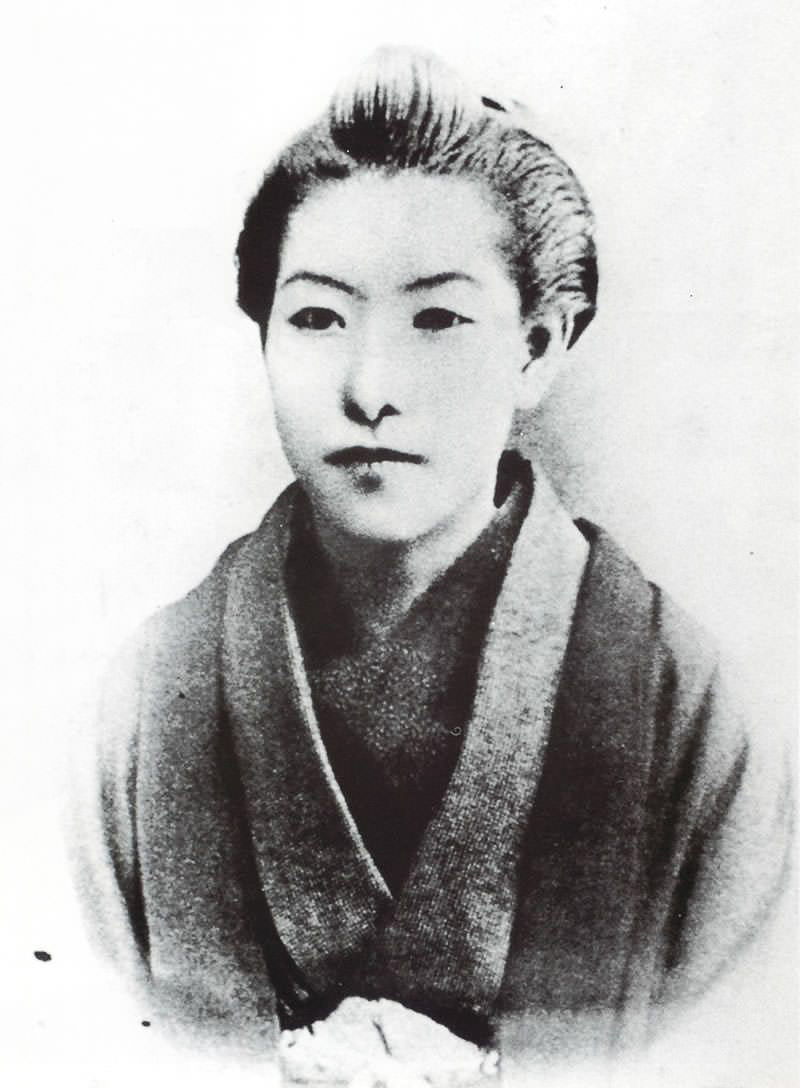
- Born: Natsuko Higuchi; 2 May 1872; Uchisaiwaichō, Chiyoda-ku, Tokyo, Empire of Japan
- Died: 23 November 1896 (aged 24); Tokyo, Empire of Japan
- Resting place: Tsukiji Hongan-ji Wadabori Cemetery, Suginami, Tokyo
- Occupation: Writer
- Writing career
- Pen name: Ichiyō Higuchi
- Period: Meiji

Natsuko Higuchi (Japanese: 樋口 夏子, Hepburn: Higuchi Natsuko; 2 May 1872 – 23 November 1896), known by her pen name Higuchi Ichiyō (樋口 一葉), was a Japanese writer during the Meiji era. She was Japan's first professional woman writer of modern literature, specializing in short stories and poetry, and was also an extensive diarist. Her portrait was used on the 5000 yen banknote in Japan.

== Biography ==
=== Early life ===
Higuchi was born in Tokyo on 2 May 1872 as the fourth child and second daughter of Noriyoshi Higuchi, a samurai, and Ayame "Taki" Furuya. Official documentation states her name as Natsuko Higuchi, though she would often refer to herself as Natsu Higuchi (樋口 奈津, Higuchi Natsu). Her parents were from a peasant community in nearby Yamanashi Prefecture, but her father had managed to procure samurai status in 1867. Despite only enjoying the position for a short time before the samurai caste was abolished with the Meiji Restoration, growing up in a samurai household was a formative experience for her.

In 1886, she began studying waka poetry at the Haginoya, a private school run by Utako Nakajima. There, she received weekly poetry lessons and lectures on Japanese literature. There were also monthly poetry competitions in which all students, previous and current, were invited to participate. Poetry taught at this school was that of the conservative court poets of the Heian period. She felt inferior and unprepossessing among the other students, the great majority of whom came from the upper-class.

Her compulsion to write became evident by 1891 when she began to keep a diary in earnest. It would become hundreds of pages long, covering five years left of her life. With her feelings of social inferiority, her timidity, and the increasing poverty of her family, her diary was the place where she could assert herself. Her diaries were also a place for her to assert objectivity and included her views on literary art as well as others' views on her work.

=== Efforts to become a writer ===
In 1889, two years after her oldest brother's death, her father died. Following a failed business investment by her father, finances were very tight. Her fiancé Saburō Shibuya (who later became a prosecutor, a judge, and the governor of Akita Prefecture) soon broke off their engagement. At the proposal of her teacher, she moved into the Haginoya as an apprentice, but left after a few months due to being unhappy with what she saw as an inordinate amount of household duties. Together with her mother and younger sister Kuniko, she moved to Hongō district, where the women earned their income by sewing and laundry work. Seeing the success of a classmate, Kaho Miyake, who had written a novel, Yabu no uguisu (lit. "Bush warbler in the grove", 1888) and received abundant royalties, Higuchi decided to become a novelist to support her family.

Her initial efforts at writing fiction were in the form of a short story. In 1891, she met her future advisor, Tōsui Nakarai, who she assumed would help connect her with editors. She fell in love with him without knowing that, at 31, he had a reputation as a womanizer, nor did she realize that he wrote popular literature which aimed to please the general public and in no way wished to be associated with serious literature. Her mentor did not return her love, and instead treated her as a younger sister. This failed relationship would become a recurrent theme in Higuchi's fiction.

In March 1892, she gave her literary debut with the story Yamizakura (Flowers at Dusk), published in the first issue of the magazine Musashino, under her pen name Higuchi Ichiyō. The stories from this first period (1892–1894) suffered from the excessive influence of Heian poetry. Higuchi felt compelled to demonstrate her classical literary training. The plots were thin, there was little development of character, and they were loaded down by excessive sentiment, especially when compared to what she was writing concurrently in her diary. However, her style developed rapidly. Several of her trademark themes appear: for example, the triangular relationship among a lonely, beautiful, young woman who has lost her parents, a handsome man who has abandoned her (and remains in the background), and a lonely and desperate ragamuffin who falls in love with her. Another theme Higuchi repeated was the ambition and cruelty of the Meiji middle class.

The story Umoregi (lit. "In Obscurity") signaled Higuchi's arrival as a professional writer. It was published in the prestigious journal Miyako no hana in November and December 1892, only nine months after she had started writing in earnest. Her work was noticed, and she was recognized as a promising new author.

=== Last years ===
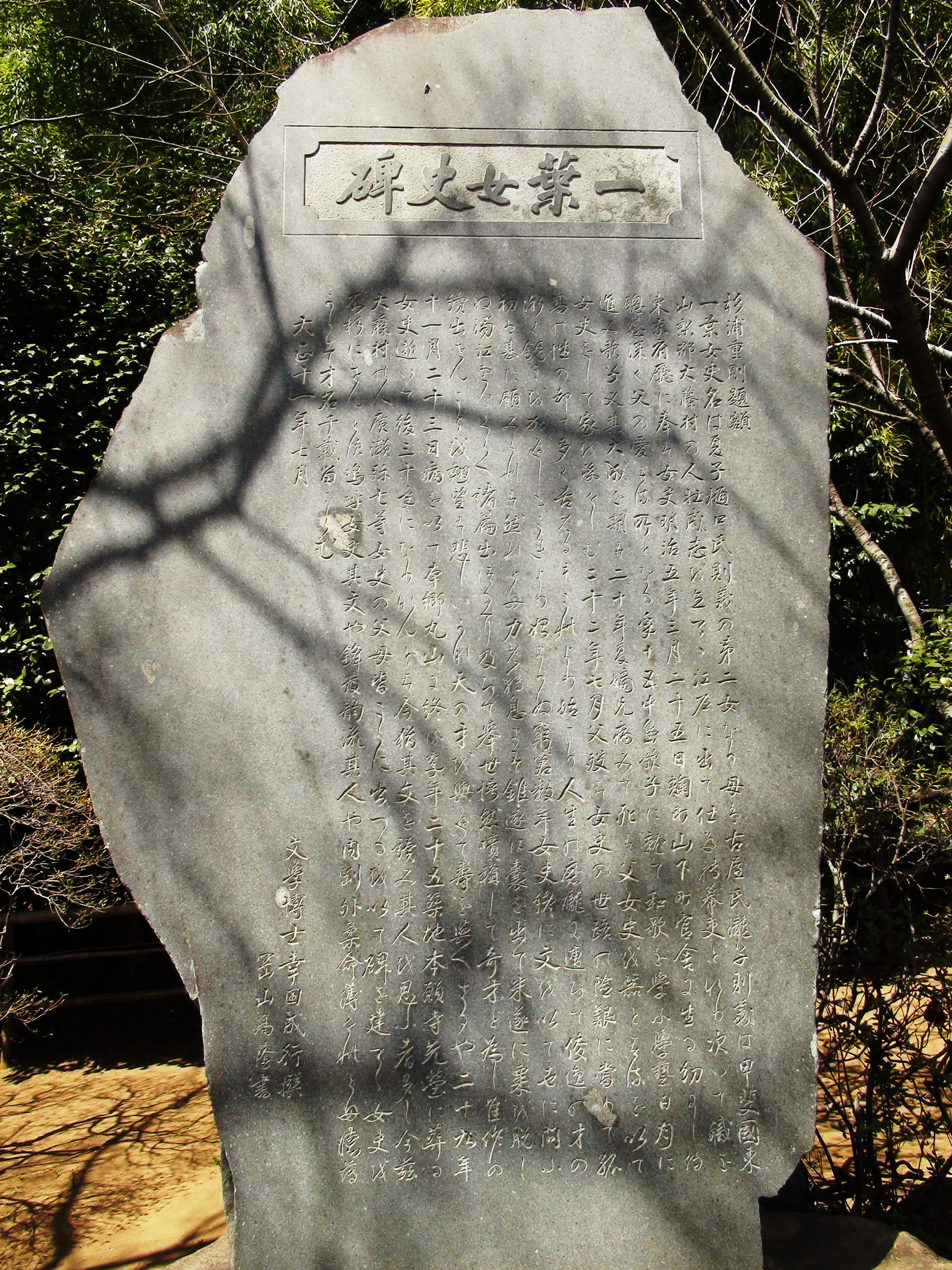
Monument of Higuchi Ichiyō in her hometown at the Jiunji or Jiun-ji Temple of Koshu

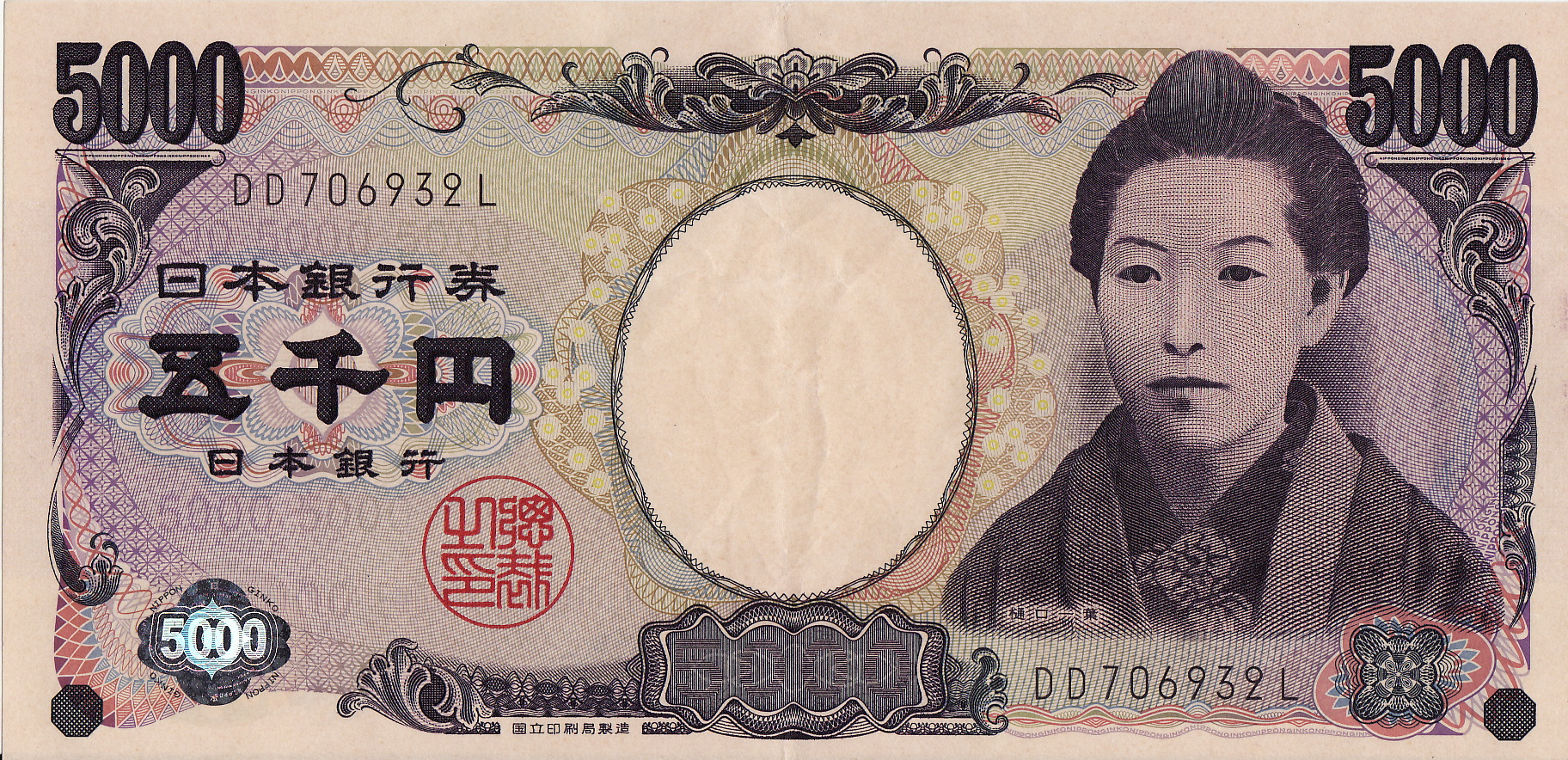
Higuchi on the 5,000 yen bill, established on 1 November 2004.

In 1893, Higuchi, her mother, and her sister abandoned their middle-class house and moved to a poor neighborhood where they opened a stationery store that failed. Their new dwelling was a five-minute walk from Tokyo's red-light district Yoshiwara. Her experience living in this neighborhood would provide material for several of her later stories, especially Takekurabe, (lit. "Comparing heights"; Child's Play in the Robert Lyons Danly translation, Growing Up in the Edward Seidensticker translation).

The stories of her mature period (1894–1896) were not only marked by her experience living near the red-light district and greater concern over the plight of women, but also by the influence of Ihara Saikaku, a 17th-century writer, whose stories she had recently discovered. His distinctiveness lay in great part in his acceptance of low-life characters as worthwhile literary subjects. What Higuchi added was a special awareness of suffering and sensitivity. To this period belong Ōtsugomori (On the Last Day of the Year), Nigorie (Troubled Waters), Jūsan'ya (The Thirteenth Night), Takekurabe, and Wakaremichi (Separate Ways).

With these last stories, her fame spread throughout the Tokyo literary establishment. She was commended for her traditional style and was called "the last woman of the old Meiji" in reflection of her evocation of the past. In her modest home, she was visited by other writers, students of poetry, admirers, critics, and editors requesting her collaboration. Due to constant interruptions and frequent headaches, Higuchi stopped writing. As her father and her oldest brother had before her, she contracted tuberculosis. She died on 23 November 1896 at the age of 24. She was buried in Tsukiji Hongan-ji Wadabori Cemetery in Suginami, Tokyo.

== Selected works ==
At the time of her death, Higuchi left behind 21 short stories, nearly 4,000 poems (which are regarded being of lesser quality than her prose), numerous essays and a multivolume diary. The year refers to the date of first publication.

=== Short stories ===
- 1892: Yamizakura (闇桜, Flowers at Dusk)
- 1892: Wakarejimo (別れ霜, Farewell Frost)
- 1892: Tamadasuki (玉襷, Jeweled Sleeve Band)
- 1892: Samidare (五月雨, Early Summer Rain or May Rain)
- 1892: Kyōzukue (経づくえ, Sutra Writing)
- 1892: Umoregi (うもれ木, In Obscurity)
- 1893: Akatsuki-zukuyo (暁月夜, Dawn Moonlit Night)
- 1893: Yuki no hi (雪の日, A Snowy Day)
- 1893: Koto no ne (琴の音, The Sound of the Koto)
- 1894: Hanagomori (花ごもり, Clouds in Springtime)
- 1894: Yamiyo (やみ夜, Encounters on a Dark Night)
- 1894: Ōtsugomori (大つごもり, On the Last Day of the Year or The Last Day of the Year)
- 1895: Takekurabe (たけくらべ, Child's Play, Growing Up, They Compare Heights or Teenagers Vying for Tops)
- 1895: Noki moru tsuki (軒もる月, The Eaves Moon)
- 1895: Yuku kumo (ゆく雲, Passing Clouds)
- 1895: Utsusemi (うつせみ, Temporary)
- 1895: Nigorie (にごりえ, Troubled Waters, Muddy Water or In the Gutter)
- 1895: Jūsan'ya (十三夜, The Thirteenth Night)
- 1896: Kono ko (この子, This Child)
- 1896: Wakaremichi (わかれ道, Separate Ways or The Parting of the Ways)
- 1896: Ware kara (われから, From Me)

== Translations ==
Higuchi's stories have been translated into a variety of languages. The first English translation dates back as early as 1903 (Ōtsugomori, as The Last Day of the Year, by Tei Fujio). In 1981, a selection of nine of her stories appeared with new translations provided by Robert Lyons Danly.

Some stories have also been translated from classical Japanese language, in which all of Higuchi's works are written, into modern Japanese, like Hiromi Itō's translation of Nigorie or Fumiko Enchi's translation of Takekurabe.

== Legacy ==
Higuchi's portrait adorns the Japanese 5000 yen banknote as of fall 2004, becoming the third woman to appear on a Japanese banknote, after Empress Jingū in 1881 and Murasaki Shikibu in 2000.

Her stories Ōtsugomori, Nigorie, Jūsan'ya and Takekurabe have been repeatedly adapted for film and television, notably An Inlet of Muddy Water (1953, dir. Tadashi Imai) and Takekurabe (1955, dir. Heinosuke Gosho).

A film based on Higuchi's life, Higuchi Ichiyō, was released in 1939, starring Isuzu Yamada and directed by Kyotaro Namiki. Higuchi was also the protagonist of a theatre play by Hisashi Inoue, Zutsuu katakori Higuchi Ichiyō, which was first performed in 1984.

A character from the Japanese anime and manga Bungo Stray Dogs was based on and named after Higuchi.
