= The Thirteenth Night =

- Short story by Ichiyō Higuchi
- Original title: Jūsan'ya
- Translator: Hisako Tanaka (1960–61); Robert Lyons Danly (1981)
- Language: Japanese

Publication
- Published in: Bungei kurabu
- Publication type: Magazine
- Publication date: 1895
- Publication place: Japan
- Published in English: 1960–61, 1981
- Media type: Print

The Thirteenth Night (Japanese: 十三夜, Hepburn: Jūsan'ya) is a short story by Japanese writer Ichiyō Higuchi first published in 1895. It follows Oseki Harada, a woman married to an abusive husband, who visits her parents to ask for their assent to a divorce.

== Plot ==
On the thirteenth night of the ninth month of the year, (Note: On the fifteenth night of the eighth month and the thirteenth night of the ninth month by the old lunar calendar, moon-parties were held and delicacies offered to friends and to the moon.) Oseki Harada stands outside her parents' lower-class house, and overhears her father telling her mother how lucky they are that they have such good children. Oseki has left her upper-class husband Isamu Harada's house in secret, leaving her young son Tarō behind, and intending to ask her parents for their assent to her divorcing her husband. Her father invites her in, and both parents express their gratitude towards Oseki's husband, who enabled a higher education for her younger brother Inosuke. They also ask her forgiveness for not visiting her in her home.

Oseki, reluctant and polite at first, eventually bursts into tears when she tells her parents of her unhappy marriage with Isamu, who treats her cruelly, always picking on her for her low education, and even humiliating her in front of the servants. She asks her parents to take her back, promising that she will take up any kind of work and support her brother. Oseki's mother takes the side of her daughter, outraged by Isamu's behaviour, reminding those present that it was Isamu who had insisted on her hand, and how they had said that Oseki was no match for a man of higher position and education like his, before finally giving in. Her father, although sympathetic to Oseki's suffering, states that it is a woman's duty to bear with her husband, also reminding her what Isamu does for the family, Inosuke in particular, and that a divorce would mean Oseki losing her son Tarō. Oseki is persuaded to agree with her father and announces she will go back to Isamu, but consider herself "dead" and a "spirit" who watches over Tarō. Upon entering a rickshaw to take her home, she hears her father crying inside the house.

Still far from their destination, the rickshaw man suddenly stops, insisting that he does not want to go any further. Oseki begs him to take her at least to Hirokōji where she can find another rickshaw. At this moment, she and the driver recognise each other – he is Roku Kōsaka, a close friend from childhood days. He apologises for his shabby appearance, telling her how he turned to an irresponsible lifestyle after her wedding, was himself talked by his mother into an unhappy marriage which did not last, and is now living in a cheap inn. While walking ahead with Roku, Oseki silently reminisces how he had been in love with her, and how she herself had fantasies of becoming his wife and working in his family's store, before her parents pressured her into the marriage with Isamu. In Hirokōji, they part ways, each returning to their own sad lives.

== Publication history ==
The Thirteenth Night first appeared in the December 1895 edition of Bungei kurabu magazine, a special issue devoted to female writers, which also contained a reprint of Higuchi's story Yamiyo. It received thoroughly positive reviews for its language and polished style.

== Translations ==
The Thirteenth Night was translated into English in 1960–61 by Hisako Tanaka and again in 1981 by Robert Lyons Danly.

== Adaptations ==
An anthology film, An Inlet of Muddy Water, was made in 1953 by Tadashi Imai, based on Higuchi's short stories The Thirteenth Night, On the Last Day of the Year (Japanese: 大つごもり, Hepburn: Ōtsugomori), and Nigorie (Japanese: にごり江), which won numerous national film prizes.

== Bibliography ==
- Davis, Paul; Harrison, Gary; Johnson, David M.; Crawford, John F., eds. (2009). The Bedford Anthology of World Literature. St. Martins Press. pp. 1124–1137. ISBN 978-0-312-44154-8.
- Winston, Leslie (2004). Female Subject, Interrupted in Higuchi Ichiyō's "The Thirteenth Night". Japanese Language and Literature. Vol. 38. American Association of Teachers of Japanese.
