= Spider-Man (Japanese TV series) =

Japanese tokusatsu television series (1978-79)

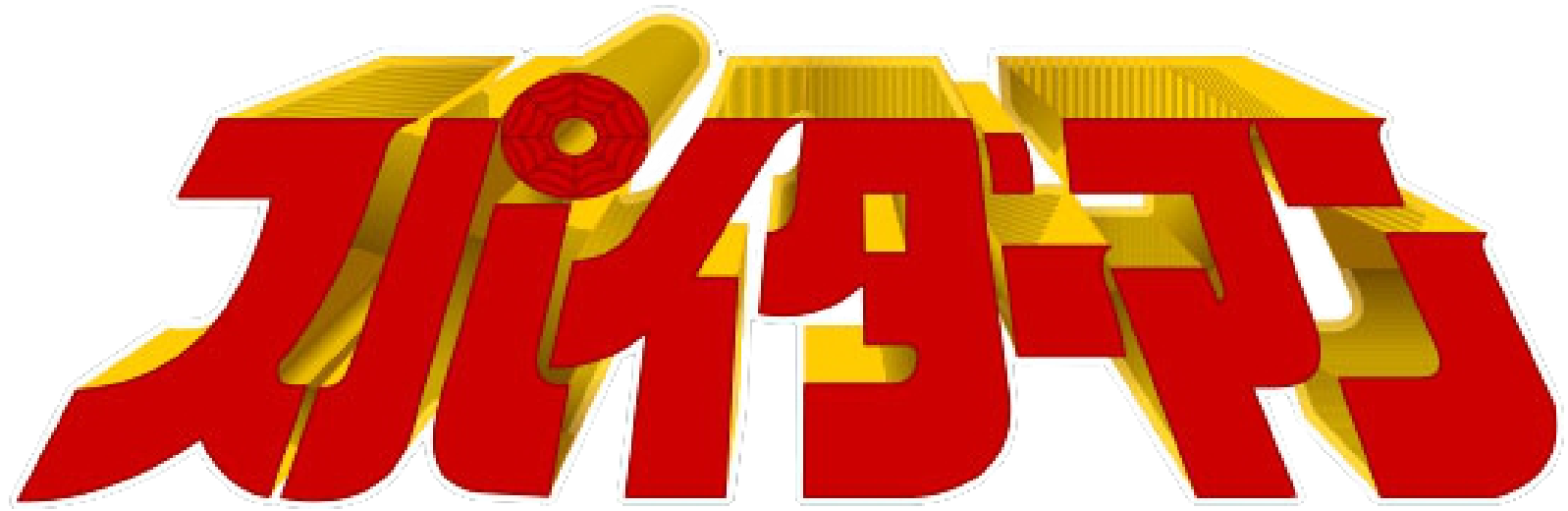
- Series logo
- Genre: Superhero
- Created by: Saburo Yatsude; Toei Company; Marvel Comics
- Based on: Spider-Man by: Stan Lee; Steve Ditko
- Written by: Shozo Uehara; Susumu Takaku
- Directed by: Koichi Takemoto
- Starring: Shinji Tōdō; Rika Miura; Mitsuo Andō; Yukie Kagawa; Izumi Ōyama; Yoshiharu Yabuki
- Narrated by: Tōru Ōhira
- Opening theme: "Kakero! Spider-Man" by Yuki Hide
- Ending theme: "Chikai no Ballad" by Yuki Hide
- Composer: Michiaki Watanabe
- Countries of origin: Japan
- Original language: Japanese
- No. of episodes: 41 (+ 1 film)

Production
- Running time: 24 minutes
- Production companies: Toei Company; Toei Advertising; Tokyo Channel 12

Original release
- Network: Tokyo Channel 12
- Release: May 17, 1978 – March 14, 1979

Related
- The Amazing Spider-Man; Spider-Man (1981 TV series); Super Sentai (Power Rangers)

Spider-Man (Japanese: スパイダーマン, Hepburn: Supaidāman), also referred to as Japanese Spider-Man or Toei Spider-Man, is a Japanese live-action tokusatsu superhero television series produced by Toei Company, loosely based on the Marvel Comics character of the same name through a contract negotiated by Gene Pelc. The series aired for 41 episodes on Tokyo Channel 12 from May 17, 1978, to March 14, 1979. A theatrical episode aired at the Toei Manga Matsuri film festival on July 22, 1978. From March 5 to December 24, 2009, Marvel uploaded English subtitled versions of the episodes to their website.

While Toei's version of the character, Takuya Yamashiro/Spider-Man (portrayed by Kōsuke Kayama (Shinji Tōdō), wore the same costume as his Marvel Comics counterpart and had similar powers, the series' storyline and the origin of his powers differed from the source material. In addition to fighting, he piloted the giant mecha Leopardon, which he would summon to fight off enlarged versions of the show's monsters; the giant robot concept would later be used in Toei's Super Sentai franchise. Yamashiro later appeared in the comic storylines Spider-Verse and Spider-Geddon.

== Plot ==
Motorcycle racer Takuya Yamashiro witnesses a UFO fall to Earth, a space warship called the Marveller. Takuya's father Dr. Hiroshi Yamashiro, a space archaeologist, investigates the case, but is killed upon finding the spaceship. The incident attracts the attention of Professor Monster and the evil Iron Cross Army (鉄十字団, Tetsu Jūji Dan), an alien group that seeks to rule the universe.

Takuya follows Hiroshi to the Marveller and discovers Garia, the last surviving warrior of Planet Spider, which was destroyed by Professor Monster and the Iron Cross Army, and was hunting Professor Monster. However, he needs someone to take up the fight and injects Takuya with some of his blood, giving him spider-like powers. He also gives him a bracelet that activates his spider protector costume, shoots web-lines, and controls the Marveller, which can also transform into the giant mecha Leopardon. Using his powers, Takuya fights Professor Monster and the Iron Cross Army as well as other threats to Earth under the name Spider-Man.

== Characters ==
=== Protagonists ===
Spider-Man

Spider-Man, striking his signature pose from the show

In the series, Spider-Man's civilian identity is 22-year-old motocross racer Takuya Yamashiro (山城 拓也, Yamashiro Takuya). He has the ability to sense threats from the Iron Cross Army with his spider-senses and fights them in order to avenge the death of his father Hiroshi. To hide his superhero identity, Takuya acts weak in front of his friends and is often made fun of for running away from danger and compared unfavorably to Spider-Man. As well, his financial income as a motorcycle racer decreases after becoming Spider-Man because he has less time to race, forcing him to help Hitomi with her job to make money.

Takuya assumes the identity of Spider-Man when he dons a protective suit called the Spider-Protector. He is genetically altered by the Spider-Extract that Garia injected into his body, giving him enhanced physical strength and spider-like abilities, such as the ability to cling to and climb walls and to sense the activities of nearby enemies through his Spider-Senses. However, he also shares some of the weaknesses of spiders, such as sensitivity to cold temperatures.

Spider-Man keeps his true identity a secret from the public, though he is well known as a defender of justice. From the movie and episode 11 onward, only Juzo Mamiya and the staff of the Interpol Secret Intelligence Division know his true identity and aid him in thwarting the schemes of the Iron Cross Army.

Spider-Man spends most of the series fighting Ninders, the foot soldiers of the Iron Cross Army, as well as the Machine BEMs. He usually cannot defeat the Machine BEMs alone because of their ability to grow in size, forcing him to summon Leopardon to fight them.

When Spider-Man confronts an enemy, he introduces himself while striking a pose, and a version of the show’s theme song plays as he begins to fight. Due to budget constraints, he rarely uses his web shooter to swing between buildings, instead relying on a car called the Spider Machine GP-7 and the Marveller for transportation. His web shooter fires rope rather than webbing, which he attaches to surfaces and uses to swing.

Venom

First and exclusively appear in 2025 crossover comic event Spider-Verse vs. Venomverse, the identity of the Venom Symbiote's host is Yaleo (ヤレオ, Yareo), the sole survivor of the Planet Spider, who then bonded with Venom, which in turn a survivor of its home planet. Afterwards, he and Venom are hellbent to get revenge on Iron Cross Army, and often clashes with Takuya for getting in their ways.

Yaleo was recruited by the Symbiote Hive-Mind to take part in a contest against the Spider-Totem avatars of the Web of Life and Destiny. However his main target is Takuya instead of fighting other Spiders.

Spider Bracelet

Spider Bracelets (スパイダーブレスレット) are bracelets worn by Spider-Man and Venom on their left wrists which can shoot webbing and store their respective costumes when not being worn. The Spider Bracelet's webbing takes the form of nets and strings made from Spider Fluid, which is stored in it. It is also equipped with a homing device that allows Spider-Man and Venom to summon their respective vehicles, such as Takuya's the GP-7 and the Marveller. A lighter version of the Spider Bracelet was built specifically for action scenes, as the one used in close-up shots was too heavy for the suit actor to wear during stunts.

- Spider Protector (スパイダープロテクター): Takuya's Spider-Man costume. Unlike his Marvel counterpart, Takuya stores the costume in the Spider Bracelet and only wears it when changing identities. When Takuya releases the Spider Protector from the Spider Bracelet, it instantly wraps around his body, allowing him to change into it quickly. It is a modified version of the costume used in the show's American counterpart, The Amazing Spider-Man, but with slanted lens rather than circular lens.
  - Takuya's suit later being upgraded by Web Weaver/Cooper Coen during the 2025 crossover comic event Spider-Verse vs. Venomverse, to completely differentiate than the costume wear by Peter Parker. The costume has white essences on body suits, neck scarf and boots, as black eyes lenses on his mask. The new Spider Protector also has red web-lined web wings.
- Venom Symbiote (ヴェノッウシムビオット): Yaleo's costume-like alien partner from a Symbiote planet, who is stored inside the Spider-Bracelet. Yaleo summons the Venom from the Bracelet to form a costume-like appearance. Like other Symbiotes, it can also bond to another host, such granting Takuya's new Spider-Protector suit a Symbiote armor.
- Spider Strings (スパイダーストリングス): A rope made of spider webbing shot from the Spider Bracelet, which can pull heavy objects.
- Spider Net (スパイダーネット): A net made of spider webbing shot from the Spider Bracelet, which can capture enemies.

Vehicles

- The Spider Machine GP-7 (スパイダーマシンGP-7, Supaidā Mashin Jī Pī Sebun): Spider-Man's flying car, which is equipped with machine guns and missile launchers in its hood and is usually stored inside the Marveller. The name GP-7 is a reference to producer Gene Pelc.

=== Giant Robots ===
Marveller / Leopardon

The Marveller (マーベラー, Māberā): The spacecraft in which Garia arrived to Earth. It is 45 meters (approx 150 feet) tall and weighs over 25,000 tons. It is usually stored underground and emerges when Spider-Man summons it. Its bridge is shaped like a leopard's head, which is where Leopardon's head is stored, and cracks left and right when transforming into robot mode called Leopardon (レオパルドン, Reoparudon). Because the Marveller is usually transformed into Leopardon when Spider-Man boards it, it is rarely seen in spacecraft mode, but can be used for transportation and is capable of flying to outer space at the speed of light. The Marveller is equipped with cannons on its bow, which can destroy most Machine BEMs.

Leopardon's size is over 60 meters (200 ft) tall and weighs over 25,000 tons.

Leopardon, Spider-Man's giant robot

Only the first few episodes of the series featured actual fight scenes between Leopardon and the giant-sized Machine BEMs. As the series progressed, it focused more on drama and fight scenes were shortened to keep up with the runtime, with some episodes not featuring Leopardon.

Leopardon and the giant-sized Machine BEMS rarely appeared together in the same shots; most giant-sized battles involved Leopardon in one shot and the Machine BEM in another launching. This was because the large Leopardon model was often bigger than the stuntmen in the Machine BEM suits. Due to structural problems, the Leopardon suit was difficult for the stuntman to move in and, over the course of the series, was damaged and later lost. As a result, future fight scenes with Leopardon could only be done using stock footage from previous fights.

Centurion

Venom's giant robot, first and exclusively appeared on Spider-Verse vs. Venomverse. Being powered with Symbiote cells, Centurion (センツリオン, Senturion) can use tendrils which can also be used to create weaponry.

=== Allies ===
Hitomi Sakuma (佐久間 ひとみ, Sakuma Hitomi)
Takuya's girlfriend, a 20-year-old freelance photographer.
Shinko Yamashiro (山城 新子, Yamashiro Shinko)
Takuya's 18-year-old younger sister, who takes care of household chores for the Yamashiro residence.
Takuji Yamashiro (山城 拓次, Yamashiro Takuji)
Takuya's 7-year-old younger brother.
Dr. Yamashiro (山城博士, Yamashiro-hakase)
Takuya's father. An astronomer who is killed during after his research leads to the discovery of the Iron Cross Army.
Garia (ガリア)
An alien from Planet Spider. 400 years prior to the events of the series, he pursued the Iron Cross Army seeking revenge after they destroyed his homeworld, but crash-landed on Earth and was imprisoned in a cave for centuries. After Takuya finds him and the Marveller, he injects him with the Spider Extract and gives him his powers, tasking him with continuing his fight before dying.
Juzo Mamiya (間宮 重三, Mamiya Jūzō)
An investigator in charge of Interpol's Secret Intelligence Division, who learns that Spider-Man is Takuya and asks for his assistance in their battle against the Iron Cross Army. After agreeing to help him, he gives Takuya a radio transmitter, allowing him and Interpol to communicate.

=== Iron Cross Army ===
The Iron Cross Army (鉄十字団, Tetsu Jūji Dan) are the main villains of the series. They are an alien army that has destroyed numerous galaxies in their path of conquest.

Professor Monster (モンスター教授, Monsutā-kyōju)
The leader of the Iron Cross Army, who was responsible for the destruction of Planet Spider 400 years ago and now seeks to conquer Earth. The blood of other lifeforms is the source of his immortality. In the final episode, he transforms into "Big Monster", but is defeated by Leopardon.
Amazoness (アマゾネス, Amazonesu)
The female commander of the Iron Cross Army, who is in charge of espionage and planning attacks. From the beginning of the series, she assumes the identity of Saeko Yoshida (吉田 冴子, Yoshida Saeko), the editor of Weekly Woman (週刊ウーマン, Shūkan-ūman) magazine. After Spider-Man sees through Saeko's true identity, she disappears from her job and Weekly Woman is discontinued soon afterward. Although she suspects that Takuya is Spider-Man, she is unable to prove this until the final episode.
Bella and Rita (ベラ＆リタ, Bera to Rita)
Ancient female warriors from an uncharted region of the Amazons whose mummified bodies are resurrected by Professor Monster. Bella wields a bow with poisoned arrows, while Rita wields a machine gun.
Ninders (ニンダー, Nindā; subtitled as Iron Cross Army henchmen on Marvel website)
The foot soldiers of the Iron Cross Army. They disguise themselves as humans while conducting undercover missions in public, but are identifiable by the exposed circuits behind their ears and their metallic hands.
Machine BEMs (マシーンベム, Mashīn Bemu)
Biological weapons created by the Iron Cross Army to carry out their plans or serve as bodyguards, which have the ability to change size at will. Their origins are not fully clarified, although some, such as Samson, are genetically modified humans, while others, such as the Monster Cat, are resurrected apparitions.

== Cast ==
- Takuya Yamashiro / Spider-Man: Shinji Tōdō
- Hitomi Sakuma: Rika Miura (episodes 1–12, 14, 15, 17, 18 & 20–41)
- Shinko Yamashiro: Izumi Ōyama (episodes 1-39 & 41)
- Takuji Yamashiro: Yoshiharu Yabuki (ep. 1–16, 18–24, 26, 27, 29–33, 35-39 & 41)
- Professor Monster: Mitsuo Andō (all episodes)
- Amazoness: Yukie Kagawa (all episodes)
- Garia: Toshiaki Nishizawa (episodes 1 & 2)
- Dr. Hiroshi Yamashiro: Fuyuki Murakami (episode 1)
- Jūzō Mamiya: Noboru Nakaya (episodes 11, 12 & 14 & Movie)
- Rita: Rie Rinehart (episodes 35–41)
- Bella: Tina Margo (episodes 35–38) Wanita Somaborudo (episodes 39–41)
- Narrator: Tōru Ōhira
- Spider-Man's suit actor: Hirofumi Koga (all episodes), Ryusuke Sakitsu (episodes 17 & 18)
- Voice of various Machine BEMs: Shōzō Iizuka (episodes 1–7, 13–21, 26 & 28-38 & Movie)
- Voice of various Machine BEMs: Hisako Kyōda (episodes 8 & 23)
- Voice of various Machine BEMs: Shin Aomori (episodes 24 & 25)

== Episode list ==
No.	Translated title/Dub title	Directed by	Written by	Japanese Airdate
1	"The Time of Revenge Has Come! Beat Down Iron Cross Group!!" "Fukushū no Toki wa Kitareri! Ute Tetsu Jūji Dan!!" (復讐の時は来たれり! 撃て鉄十字団!!)	Kōichi Takemoto	Shōzō Uehara	May 17, 1978
2	"Mysterious World! The Man Who Follows His Fate" "Kaiki no Sekai! Shukumei ni Ikiru Otoko" (怪奇の世界! 宿命に生きる男)	Kōichi Takemoto	Susumu Takaku	May 24, 1978
3	"Phantom Thief 001 VS. Spider-Man" "Kaitō Daburu-Ō Wan Tai Kumo-Otoko" (怪盗001vsくも男)	Katsuhiko Taguchi	Susumu Takaku	May 31, 1978
4	"The Terrifying Half Merman! The Miracle-Calling Silver Thread" "Kyōfu no Hangyojin! Kiseki o Yobu Gin no Ito" (恐怖の半魚人! 奇蹟を呼ぶ銀の糸)	Katsuhiko Taguchi	Shōzō Uehara	June 7, 1978
5	"Crash Machine GP-7! The Oath Siblings" "Gekitotsu Mashin Jī-Pī-Sebun! Kyōdai no Chikai" (激突マシンGP-7! 兄弟の誓い)	Kōichi Takemoto	Susumu Takaku	June 14, 1978
6	"Shuddering Laboratory! Devilish Professor Monster" "Senritsu no Jikkenshitsu! Akuma no Monsutā Kyōju" (戦慄の実験室! 悪魔のモンスター教授)	Kōichi Takemoto	Shōzō Uehara	June 21, 1978
7	"Fearful Hit Tune! Song Dancing Murder Rock" "Osoroshiki Hitto-Kyoku! Utatte Odoru Satsujin Rokku" (恐ろしきヒット曲! 歌って踊る殺人ロック)	Katsuhiko Taguchi	Shōzō Uehara	June 28, 1978
8	"A Very Mysterious Folktale: The Cursed Cat Mound" "Yo ni mo Fushigi na Mukashi-Banashi Noroi no Neko-Zuka" (世にも不思議な昔ばなし 呪いの猫塚)	Katsuhiko Taguchi	Susumu Takaku	July 5, 1978
9	"Motion Accessory Is a Loveful Beetle Insect Spy" "Ugoku Akusesarī wa Koi no Kabutomushi Supai" (動くアクセサリーは恋のカブト虫スパイ)	Takaharu Saeki	Shōzō Uehara	July 12, 1978
10	"To the Flaming Hell: See the Tears of the Snake Woman" "Honō Jigoku ni Hebi-Onna no Namida o Mita" (炎地獄にへび女の涙を見た)	Takaharu Saeki	Shōzō Uehara	July 19, 1978
Movie	"Spider-Man" "Supaidāman" (スパイダーマン)	Kōichi Takemoto	Susumu Takaku	July 22, 1978
11	"Professor Monster's Ultra Poisoning" "Monsutā Kyōju no Urutora Dokusatsu" (モンスター教授のウルトラ毒殺)	Kōichi Takemoto	Susumu Takaku	July 26, 1978
12	"Becoming Splendid: To the Murderous Machine of Transformation" "Karei Naru Satsujin Mashīn e no Henshin" (華麗なる殺人マシーンへの変身)	Kōichi Takemoto	Shōzō Uehara	August 2, 1978
13	"The Skull Group VS. The Devilish Hearse" "Dokuro Dan Tai Akuma no Reikyūsha" (ドクロ団対悪魔の霊柩車)	Kimio Hirayama	Susumu Takaku	August 9, 1978
14	"Dedicate to My Father the Song of a Brave Man Who Cannot Fight" "Chichi ni Sasageyo Tatakaenu Yūsha no Uta o" (父に捧げよ 戦えぬ勇者の歌を)	Kimio Hirayama	Shōzō Uehara	August 16, 1978
15	"The Promise of Our Lives" "Bokutachi no Inochi no Yakusoku" (ぼくたちの命の約束)	Kōichi Takemoto	Susumu Takaku	August 23, 1978
16	"Famous Dog, Run Back to Father!" "Meiken yo Chichi no Moto e Hashire" (名犬よ 父のもとへ走れ)	Kōichi Takemoto	Shōzō Uehara	August 30, 1978
17	"Pro Wrestler Samson's Tears" "Puro Resurā Samuson no Namida" (プロレスラー サムソンの涙)	Takaharu Saeki	Susumu Takaku	September 6, 1978
18	"In the Mother's Chest: Resurrect the Young Boys" "Haha no Mune ni Yomigaeru Shōnen" (母の胸に甦る少年)	Takaharu Saeki	Kuniaki Oshikawa	September 13, 1978
19	"The Boy Phantom: To the Villageless Map" "Maboroshi no Shōnen Chizu ni Nai Mura" (まぼろしの少年 地図にない村)	Kōichi Takemoto	Shōzō Uehara	September 20, 1978
20	"Riddle: Calling the Riddle of My Secret Birth" "Nazo ga Nazo o Yobu Watashi no Shuushō no Himitsu" (謎が謎を呼ぶ私の出生の秘密)	Kōichi Takemoto	Hirohisa Soda	September 27, 1978
21	"Fall to the Great Skies: Father's Love" "Ōzora ni Chiru Chichi no Ai" (大空に散る父の愛)	Kōichi Takemoto	Susumu Takaku	October 4, 1978
22	"Shedding Tears to the Dark Fate: Father and Child" "Kurai Unmei ni Nake Chichi to Ko" (暗い運命に泣け 父と子)	Takaharu Saeki	Susumu Takaku	October 11, 1978
23	"To the Love Academy of the Homeless Children" "Ie Naki Ko tachi ni Ai no Gakuen o" (家なき子たちに愛の学園を)	Takaharu Saeki	Hirohisa Soda	October 18, 1978
24	"Cockroach Boy: Great War" "Gokiburi Shōnen Dai Sensō" (ゴキブリ少年大戦争)	Hideo Tanaka	Susumu Takaku	October 25, 1978
25	"Treasure, Dog, and Double Grow Human" "Hihō to Inu to Fukusei-Ningen" (秘宝と犬と複成人間)	Hideo Tanaka	Mikio Matsushita	November 1, 1978
26	"To the Absolute Crisis: The Imitation Hero" "Zettai Pinchi no Nisemono Hīrō" (絶対ピンチのにせものヒーロー)	Kōichi Takemoto	Kuniaki Oshikawa	November 8, 1978
27	"Farewell War Buddy: Beloved German Shepherd" "Saraba Sen'yū Itoshi no Sepādo" (さらば戦友 愛しのセパード)	Kōichi Takemoto	Susumu Takaku	November 15, 1978
28	"The Front of the Alley: Boys' Detective Group" "Ekimae Yokochō no Shōnen Tantei Dan" (駅前横町の少年探偵団)	Yoshiaki Kobayashi	Mikio Matsushita	November 22, 1978
29	"Hurry, GP-7: Time of Stop Sign" "Isoge Jī-Pī-Sebun Jikan yo Tomare" (急げGP-7 時間よ止まれ)	Yoshiaki Kobayashi	Shōzō Uehara	November 29, 1978
30	"Good Luck, Beautiful Police Officer" "Ganbare Bijin Omawarisan" (ガンバレ美人おまわりさん)	Takaharu Saeki	Hirohisa Soda	December 6, 1978
31	"There Is No Child-Taking Detective Tomorrow" "Ashita Naki Kozure Keiji" (明日なき子連れ刑事)	Kōichi Takemoto	Shōzō Uehara	December 13, 1978
32	"Sweet Whispering Enchantress" "Amaku Sasayaku Yōjo" (甘くささやく妖女)	Takaharu Saeki	Mikio Matsushita	December 20, 1978
33	"The Boy Teases the Horrible Wild Girl" "Otokonoko o Ibiru Yasei no Sugoi Shōjo" (男の子をイビる野性の凄い少女)	Kōichi Takemoto	Susumu Takaku	December 27, 1978
34	"Surprising Camera: Murderous Event" "Bikkuri Kamera Satsujin Jiken" (びっくりカメラ殺人事件)	Kōichi Takemoto	Hirohisa Soda	January 10, 1979
35	"From the Unexplored Amazon: Here Comes the Mummified Beautiful Woman" "Hikyō Amazon kara Kita Mīra Bijo" (秘境アマゾンから来たミイラ美女)	Yoshiaki Kobayashi	Susumu Takaku	January 17, 1979
36	"The Onion Silver Mask and the Boys' Detective Group" "Tamanegi Tekkamen to Shōnen Tantei Dan" (たまねぎ鉄仮面と少年探偵団)	Yoshiaki Kobayashi	Shōzō Uehara	January 31, 1979
37	"From the Secret Messenger of Hell: Great King Enma" "Jigoku kara no Misshi Enma Daiō" (地獄からの密使 えん魔大王)	Takaharu Saeki	Susumu Takaku	February 7, 1979
38	"The First Tin Plate Evening Star and the Boys' Detective Group" "Buriki no Ichibanboshi to Shōnen Tantei Dan" (ブリキの一番星と少年探偵団)	Takaharu Saeki	Hirohisa Soda	February 14, 1979
39	"Sports World: One Great Meeting" "Kakutōgi Sekai-Ichi Taikai" (格闘技世界一大会)	Yoshiaki Kobayashi	Shōzō Uehara	February 21, 1979
40	"Farewell Zero Battle Tricks" "Saraba Zero-Sen no Nazo" (さらばゼロ戦の謎)	Yoshiaki Kobayashi	Mikio Matsushita	March 7, 1979
41	"The Hero's Shining Hot Blood" "Kagayake Nekketsu no Yūsha" (輝け熱血の勇者)	Yoshiaki Kobayashi	Shōzō Uehara	March 14, 1979

== Production ==
The show was the result of a three-year licensing agreement that allowed both companies to use each other’s properties. Toei initially planned to introduce Spider-Man as a supporting character in a proposed television series starring a fictionalized version of Yamato Takeru, who was sent to the present through a time warp. This version of Spider-Man was intended to be identical to the Marvel version. However, Toei decided to make Spider-Man the protagonist instead, and the character of Yamato Takeru was reworked into Garia, an alien who gives Spider-Man his powers. The resulting show departed almost entirely from the source material, retaining only Spider-Man’s costume and some of his superpowers and gadgets. Other Toei productions resulting from this licensing deal included ‘’Battle Fever J’’ (originally conceived as a show about a Japanese counterpart to Captain America) and an animated television film based on the comic book ‘’Tomb of Dracula’’. Marvel, in turn, used the main robots from two of Toei’s anime programs, ‘’Wakusei Robo Danguard Ace’’ and ‘’Chōdenji Robo Combattler V’’, in its comic book adaptation of the ‘’Shogun Warriors’’ toy line. A toy version of Leopardon, Spider-Man’s robot from the Toei series, was also sold in the United States as part of the Godaikin line.

Although the show's story was criticized by some for bearing almost no resemblance to the Marvel version, the staff at Marvel Comics, including Spider-Man's co-creator Stan Lee, praised the show for its special effects and stunt work, especially the spider-like movement of the character himself. While it is said that Marvel initially opposed the addition of Leopardon, the robot was viewed as a necessary gimmick to attract younger viewers and was ultimately kept. The show's mechanical designer, Katsushi Murakami (a toy designer at the time), expressed concern about Toei's capability to market Spider-Man to Japanese audiences and was given permission by producer Yoshinori Watanabe to take whatever liberties he deemed necessary. Murakami came up with the idea of giving Spider-Man an extraterrestrial origin, as well as a spider-like spacecraft that could transform into a giant robot (due to the popularity of the giant robot shows in Japan at the time).

The action figure version of Leopardon was initially sold as a part of the Chogokin toyline and became an unprecedented success in the market, which contributed to the TV series' popularity as well. The success of the show made Toei introduce the giant robot concept to their Super Sentai franchise in Battle Fever J (a show which they also co-produced with Marvel) and contributed to Spider-Man's popularity when Marvel began to export more of their properties to Japan during later years.

The head writer of the series was Shozo Uehara (Gorenger, JAKQ, The Return of Ultraman), who wrote 15 episodes, while Uehara's Sentai collaborator Susumu Takaku (who was head writer of the show alongside Uehara) wrote 15 episodes and the movie. There were many episodes in which the "monster of the week" (usually a "Machine BEM" created by the villain) was not relevant to the plot, as well as two episodes (ep. 12 and ep. 27) which featured no monsters at all. The show also featured a story arc in which the female antagonist Amazoness tries to uncover Spider-Man's secret identity.

Rather infamously, after the first 12 episodes of the series, every time Spider-Man's giant robot finished a monster, it always used the exact same shot only with a new monster composited in, but due to the nature of the splice, the very first monster of the series was always visible very briefly before exploding. Rumors persisted that the Leopardon suit had been stolen from the set and was the reason for the switch to stock footage. However, according to an account from Gene Pelc's son who had been on set, the suit had not been stolen and the switch to stock footage had been a budgetary measure. The Leopardon suit was later repurposed into Daidenzin, the main robot from Denshi Sentai Denjiman.

== Film ==
A theatrical version of Spider-Man was shown on the Toei Manga Matsuri film festival on July 22, 1978. It was directed by series director Kōichi Takemoto and written by Susumu Takaku. The film was the first appearance of the character of Juzo Mamiya, who subsequently appeared in three episodes of the series (11, 12 and 14). Because of this, the film takes place between episodes 10 and 11.

== Staff ==
- Producer: Susumu Yoshikawa (Toei), Hiroshi Ishikawa (Tokyo Channel 12)
- Creator: Saburo Yatsude (based on the Marvel Comics character Spider-Man created by Stan Lee and Steve Ditko)
- Music composer: Michiaki Watanabe
  - Music producer: Andante
  - Music performers: Colombia Percussion Ensemble (catalog number: Columbia Record CQ-7010)
- Character designer: Kikakusha 104, Muneo Kubo
- Costume production: Ekisu Production
- Screenplays: Shōzō Uehara, Susumu Takaku, Kuniaki Oshikawa, Hirohisa Soda, Mikio Matsushita
- Directors: Kōichi Takemoto, Katsuhiko Taguchi, Takaharu Saeki, Kimio Hirayama, Hideo Tanaka, Yoshiaki Kobayashi
- Stunt Coordinators: Osamu Kaneda, Junji Yamaoka (Japan Action Club)
- Special Effects Director: Nobuo Yajima (uncredited in the show)
- Assistant Directors: Masao Minowa and others
- Producing Companies: Toei, Toei Advertising, Tokyo Channel 12

== Theme songs ==
Opening theme

- "Kakero! Spider-Man" (駆けろ！スパイダーマン, Kakero! Supaidāman; Run! Spider-Man)
  - Lyrics: Saburo Yatsude
  - Composition & Arrangement: Michiaki Watanabe (listed as Chumei Watanabe)
  - Artist: Yuki Hide

Ending theme

- "Chikai no Ballade" (誓いのバラード, Chikai no Barādo; The Oath's Ballade)
  - Lyrics: Saburo Yatsude
  - Composition & Arrangement: Michiaki Watanabe (listed as Chumei Watanabe)
  - Artist: Yuki Hide

== Home media ==
7-DVD box set

Spider-Man was a Marvel property until 2009, when it was acquired by The Walt Disney Company, and in March 2023, Marvel Entertainment officially closed and folded into other divisions of Disney, of which Spider-Man is now part of Disney Publishing Worldwide as of March 29, 2023. Toei was not allowed to rebroadcast the series or use publicity stills of Spider-Man from the show without paying licensing fees to Marvel, and since 2009, Disney. Original characters and other elements exclusive to Toei's television series (such as the villains and the giant robot Leopardon) were exempt from these licensing issues, as these were creations of Toei.

As a result, only a single VHS collection of episodes (which featured episodes 1 and 31, and the movie) was released in Japan during the 1980s, and reprints of the official soundtrack had the original cover on the jacket replaced with an image of Leopardon. The rest of the series was unavailable on home video for many years. The 1995 superhero guidebook Chōjin Gahō (超人画報, The Super Heroes Chronicle) (published by Takeshobo) was the last time Toei was allowed to publish a photograph of Spider-Man. Every retrospective coverage of Toei's Spider-Man published since then was done without using photographs of the Spider-Man character himself.

In 2004, Toei began renegotiating with Marvel for the rights to release the series on DVD in Japan. The Region 2 DVD box set was released on December 9, 2005, and includes all 41 episodes and the movie on seven discs, as well as a 148-page booklet which features every publicity still of Spider-Man shot for the series. In July 2006, Bandai released a series of toys related to the Toei's Spider-Man TV series, such as the Soul of Chogokin GX-33 Leopardon toy robot (with a Spider-Man figure included), the "Soul of Soft Vinyl" Spider-Man action figure, and a Popynica Spider-Machine GP-7 toy car.

On March 5, 2009, Marvel began broadcasting the series to an international audience for the first time on their video streaming website. A different episode (including the movie version) was uploaded every week until the entire series was available on December 17 of the same year. These episodes were shown in their original Japanese audio with English subtitles. The episodes were later taken down following the acquisition of Marvel Entertainment by The Walt Disney Company, which owns rights to this series. Any distribution or production of this series would have to be authorised by Sony Pictures Home Entertainment, as the official agent of Buena Vista Home Entertainment, the official agency for Spider-Man as a Disney property.

== Legacy ==
Spider-Man: The Animated Series (Spider-Man TAS), which ran from 1994 to 1998, drew some influence from Japanese Spider-Man. The writer of Spider-Man TAS, John Semper, found Japanese Spider-Man to be the only previous Spider-Man adaptation that impressed him, as he thought it was a "great" show and "goofy fun". Japanese Spider-Man's giant robot influenced the final multi-part parallel universe arc where Spider-Man's wealthy alter-ego has a robot.

The massive success of the show and the sales for the Leopardon toys inspired Toei to integrate a Giant Robot to their Super Sentai series, which would not only lead it to become one of the most popular Tokusatsu franchises in Japan but also led to the success of Power Rangers.

=== In other media ===
Apart from the costume and powers of the main character, this TV series is unrelated to Ryoichi Ikegami's earlier manga adaptation of Spider-Man or the original Spider-Man comics. However, several manga adaptations of the Toei version were published by different magazines, such as TV Land, Tanoshī Yōchien, TV Magazine, and Bōken'ō.

Takuya Yamashiro and Leopardon appeared in several issues of the 2014 and 2018 comic book events Spider-Verse and Spider-Geddon, alongside other alternate universe versions of Spider-Man such as Miles Morales and Miguel O'Hara (Spider-Man 2099), thereby allowing Yamashiro to interact with his fellow Spider-Men for the first time in Marvel canon.

In a 2025 crossover comic event Spider-Verse vs. Venomverse, Yamashiro receives an upgraded suit created by Web-Weaver (Cooper Coen), in order to completely differentiate himself from the one worn by Peter Parker. Additionally, the said crossover event also introduces a Venom from the same universe as Yamashiro's, whose identity is Yaleo, with his robot companion Centurion.

A version of Spider-Man's giant robot, Leopardon, appears in Ernest Cline's novel Ready Player One.

== See also ==
- Spider-Man: The Manga
- Spider-Man J
