= Spider-Man (Takuya Yamashiro) =

Toei's Spider-Man character

Supaidaman
- Toei's Spider-Man character
- Kōsuke Kayama (Shinji Tōdō) as Spider-Man in Spider-Man (1978)
- First appearance: "The Time of Revenge Has Come! Beat Down Iron Cross Group!!"; Spider-Man; May 17, 1978
- Based on: Spider-Man by: Stan Lee; Steve Ditko
- Adapted by: Shozo Uehara; Susumu Takaku
- Portrayed by: Kōsuke Kayama (Shinji Tōdō)

In-universe information
- Alias: Takuya Yamashiro
- Nicknames: Japanese Spider-Man; Toei Spider-Man; Iron Cross Killer; Emissary of Hell; Man with Burning Passion; Destroyer of The Mushroom
- Species: Human mutate
- Occupation: Motocross driver; Photographer; Vigilante
- Affiliation: International Criminal Police Organization; Spider-Army/Web-Warriors
- Nationality: Japanese
- Homeworld: Earth-51778

Takuya Yamashiro (山城 拓也, Yamashiro Takuya), also known as Spider-Man (Japanese: スパイダーマン, Hepburn: Supaidāman) and colloquially as the Japanese Spider-Man, is a superhero portrayed by Kōsuke Kayama (Shinji Tōdō), based on the Marvel Comics character of the same name. He is the protagonist of Toei's 1978 Spider-Man television series, subsequently reappearing as a supporting character in the 2014–2015 Spider-Verse, the 2018 Spider-Geddon, the 2022–2023 End of the Spider-Verse, and the 2025 Spider-Verse vs. Venomverse comic storylines. The success of Yamashiro and his giant mecha robot Leopardon made Toei adapt the concept to their Super Sentai franchise in Battle Fever J, ultimately making the character the narrative forefather of the Power Rangers.

== Fictional character biography ==
Takuya Yamashiro was a motocross driver, son of the astrophysicist Dr. Hiroshi Yamashiro, and the man who would become his reality's Spider-Man. Whilst practicing on his motorbike, Takuya began to receive telepathic messages from an alien called Garia, who had been imprisoned in a cave by a vampiric warlord called Professor Monster. His sister Shinko and his girlfriend Hitomi Sakuma asked for Takuya's assistance in investigating the crashed Leopardon, but he refused as he had a race to compete in. As a result, Takuya's father, who had been searching for Garia, went with Shinko and Hitomi instead.

Before leaving for the contest, Takuya received more messages from Garia and decided to investigate. In the mountains he found Hitomi and Shinko, who told Takuya their father had been attacked. Takuya found his dying father, who had been mortally wounded by a creature working for Professor Monster called Boukunryu. After his father died, Takuya was attacked by the Iron Cross Army and gravely injured, falling into the cave where Garia was imprisoned. Garia saved his life by giving him a Spider Bracelet and Spider Extract, which altered his DNA to grant him spider-like abilities. He then informed Takuya of Professor Monster's planned invasion, as well as his personal history. Back at his house, Garia told Takuya of his new costume and abilities and tested them out, before discovering the Iron Cross Army had kidnapped Professor Fujita. Spider-Man set out to confront the group and freed the Professor. He was then attacked by Boukunryu and found himself unable to defeat the monster, until he summoned Leopardon and unleashed its Sword Vigor. This destroyed Boukunryu, and Spider-Man vowed to defeat the rest of the Iron Cross Army.

Takuya later found a message in his father's diary which read "always take responsibility for your actions". This inspired him to use his powers to become a superhero, fighting crime as well as the Iron Cross Army. After joining Interpol, Spider-Man eventually confronted and seemingly killed Professor Monster, finally avenging his father's death. He also gave a young orphaned boy named Ichiro Murakami superpowers through a blood transfusion.

== Comic appearances ==
Japanese Spider-Man's first full comic appearance, as he appears in The Amazing Spider-Man vol. 3 #12, art by Justin Ponsor.

=== Spider-Verse ===
During the "Spider-Verse" storyline, Takuya was brought from Earth-51778 into the war against the Inheritors by Earth-616's Spider-Man and Spider-Girl, as well as Earth-65's Spider-Woman. As soon as the group arrived in their former safe zone, Earth-13, Takuya, who was already piloting Leopardon, faced off against Solus, but the villain made quick work of the giant robot. Luckily, Takuya managed to escape the confrontation alive and join the rest of the Spider-People. Takuya stayed with the group and, during the final battle in Loomworld, he was reunited with Leopardon. Spider-Man 2099 and Lady Spider managed to fix the robot with "some future tech and some steam-power". After the Inheritors' defeat, Takuya safely returned to his world.

Takuya remained on Planet Spider, where he lived in a traditional Japanese house, and allowed Spider-Zero to stay with him until Miles Morales came. Soon after, Spider-Zero and Miles began their journey to repair the multiverse.

The Machine Bem Monsters that were created to stop Takuya attacked the new team of Spider-Men, and Takuya came through a portal from Planet Spider along with Leopardon. He participated in the final battle, and was later sent back to his home universe by Spiderling.

=== Spider-Geddon ===
During the "Spider-Geddon" storyline, Superior Spider-Man (Doctor Octopus' mind in a Proto-Clone body) and Spider-Man of Earth-1048 warn Takuya that the Inheritors have escaped. He talks with the alternate Spider-Men on how to defeat the Inheritors. He allows Superior Spider-Man to analyze the Multiverse to find new recruits to help fight the Inheritors like a Spider-Cop and a Tyrannosaurus. During the Spider-Army's attack on the Inheritors who are using the abandoned New U Technologies as a base, Takuya starts to have Leopardon transform until he is attacked by Daemos. When Miles Morales becomes the latest Captain Universe, he uses Leopardon's sword to attack Solus, Brix, Bora, and Daemos.

=== Spider-Verse vs. Venomverse ===
Prior to the Spider-Verse-related events, Takuya had an encounter with his universe's Venom, whose host is Yaleo, the sole survivor of Planet Spider, much like how the Venom symbiote is the sole survivor of its planet. Both are hellbent on getting revenge on the Iron Cross Army for what it did to their home planets, leading them to clash with Takuya.

During Spider-Verse vs. Venomverse, Takuya and Yaleo are chosen to compete in a battle between two teams composed of alternate versions of Spider-Man and Venom, respectively, where Yaleo's sole purpose is to defeat Takuya, no one else. Before the match starts, Takuya receives a new suit designed by Web-Weaver (Cooper Coen) to better differentiate himself from Peter Parker's iconic Spider-Man suit.

== Powers and abilities ==
As Spider-Man, Takuya Yamashiro's powers include superhuman strength, speed, accelerated healing, being able to cling to most surfaces, heightened eyesight, and X-ray vision. He ages slower than regular humans, and is a skilled practitioner of ninjitsu. He also has the ability to communicate with spiders, and like many other versions of Spider-Man, he possesses a spider-sense which warns him of danger, in addition to having precognitive dreams. Similarly, he uses his Spider Bracelet to shoot webs and nets, with the device also being able to magnetically unlock doors, identify aliens in disguise, and deflect lasers. The Spider Bracelet vanishes when it is not in use, in addition to being able to produce a spare version of his costume if his original is damaged. His powers can be transferred to other people via a blood transfusion.

== In other media ==
- In 2019, when asked on Twitter if Yamashiro was set to appear in a sequel to the film Spider-Man: Into the Spider-Verse, co-director Phil Lord confirmed that the character had been designed, but he did not appear in the second film, Spider-Man: Across the Spider-Verse. However, a third film, Spider-Man: Beyond the Spider-Verse, is also in development and is scheduled to be released on June 18, 2027; both the second and third films were originally written as one film before being split into two parts.
- A Takuya Yamashiro / Japanese Spider-Man Funko Pop Vinyl figure was released as a Previews exclusive in 2021, with a second Funko Pop Vinyl figure bundled with a soda drink becoming available in 2022.
- Apart from the costume and powers of the main character, this TV series is unrelated to Ryoichi Ikegami's earlier manga adaptation of Spider-Man or the original Spider-Man comics. However, several manga adaptations of the Toei version were published by different magazines, such as TV Land, Tanoshī Yōchien, TV Magazine, and Bōken'ō.

== See also ==
- Spider-Man in television
- Spider-Man in film
