= Spidey Super Stories =

- Genre: Superhero
- Based on: Spider-Man by: Stan Lee; Steve Ditko
- Starring: Danny Seagren
- Country of origin: United States
- No. of episodes: 29

Production
- Running time: 5 minutes
- Production company: Children's Television Workshop

Original release
- Network: PBS
- Release: October 1974 – 1977

Related
- Spider-Man (1967 TV series); The Amazing Spider-Man (TV series)

Spidey Super Stories is a recurring live-action skit on the original version of the Children's Television Workshop series The Electric Company.

== Overview ==
Episodes feature the Marvel Comics character Spider-Man, provided to the Children's Television Workshop free of charge. Spider-Man is portrayed (always in costume) by puppeteer and dancer Danny Seagren. The series premiered during the first episode of The Electric Company's fourth season (1974–1975), which was given the production number 391. It predates the pilot film of the series The Amazing Spider-Man by three years, becoming the first recorded live-action rendition of Spider-Man, and was the first recorded live-action rendition of a Marvel character in any medium since the Captain America serial of 1944. There was a live stage show travelling the country in 1972/1973, The Bullwinkle Show, produced by Jay Ward/Fun Time Productions, featuring costumed cartoon characters, including Spider-Man, which was the first entertainment featuring a live-action Spider-Man.

Stories involve the masked superhero foiling mischievous characters who are involved in petty criminal activities, although sometimes the crooks commit more serious crimes such as assault or larceny. The cast of The Electric Company plays the roles of the various characters in each story, with another serving as narrator. In many of these sketches, in keeping with Stan Lee's writing style, viewers were addressed as "true believers".

Unlike other live-action and cartoon productions of Spider-Man, this version of the web-slinging hero does not speak out loud, instead communicating only with word balloons in order to encourage young viewers to practice their reading skills. Due to the series' budget limitations, comic book panels are interspersed through each skit in lieu of special effects. Aside from Spider-Man himself, no characters from the comic series ever appeared on Spidey Super Stories.

== Theme song ==
The theme song that plays at the beginning and end of the shorts was written by Gary William Friedman. The lyrics are as follows:

Spider-Man, where are you coming from?
Spider-Man, nobody knows who you are!
Spider-Man, you've got that Spidey touch
Spider-Man, you are a web-slinging star!

== Episodes ==
Approximately one dozen "Spidey Super Stories" segments were produced during The Electric Company's 1974–1975 season, with another twelve or so during the 1975–1976 season, and further episodes during the series' final season.

A 4-DVD boxed set was released by Shout! Factory and Sony BMG Music Entertainment on February 7, 2006, named The Best of Electric Company. It features 20 episodes from 1971–1977 (D4D 34121), three of which contain Spidey segments.

A second 4-DVD boxed set with 20 shows from 1971–1976 was released on November 14, 2006 (82666-31014). Two of the episodes in this boxed set feature Spidey segments; however, in several of the other episodes, the Spider-Man segments were edited out to minimize the appearance of the character because of rights issues. Episode 60A, from season five, which features a Spider-Man sketch as the sketch of the day, was altered drastically from the version that originally aired on television.

Another DVD named The Best of the Best of Electric Company, a truncated version of the volume-one boxed set, was released on March 7, 2006 (DD 31006).

=== 1974–75 ===
A number of episodes from season 4 of The Electric Company feature Spidey battling the villain in the screenshot of the comic book cover. Others only had a stock picture of Spidey alone.

No.	Title	Narrator
1	"Spidey Meets the Spoiler"	Morgan Freeman
The first "Spidey Super Stories" segment. Spidey links clues to the Spoiler (Skip Hinnant), a mischievous villain who aims to spoil people's fun. Spidey defeats him, but the victory is bittersweet: a wall got spoiled when Spidey knocks the Spoiler through it. The opening shot cover features the Spoiler leaping at Spidey. NOTE: Spider-Man also appears in the opening sequence of the actual Season 4 premiere. In the scene, Easy Reader (Morgan Freeman) announces to J. Arthur Crank (Jim Boyd) that Spider-Man will be a new recruit on The Electric Company, but Crank finds the idea to be nonsense. However, Spider-Man appears and steals Crank's comic book from behind his back, leaving Crank to believe that Easy stole it.
2	"A Night at the Movies"	Skip Hinnant
Count Dracula (Morgan Freeman) plans to bite the neck of an unsuspecting moviegoer (Judy Graubart). Spidey is able to foil Dracula's plans. NOTE: Count Dracula (based on the Bram Stoker character) was a regular character on The Electric Company, appearing in skits with the Werewolf (Jim Boyd) and Frankenstein's monster (Skip Hinnant). It was episode 9B's sketch of the day.
3	"Spider-Man Meets the Evil Dr. Fly"	Morgan Freeman
Dr. Fly (Luis Avalos), a mutated half-human, half-fly plans to turn the world's inhabitants into the same type of mutant. He disguises himself as a vendor to distribute hot dogs laced with a formula of fleas, flies and other insects. Spidey saves a customer (Jim Boyd) from eating a tainted hot dog and traps Dr. Fly in his web, but gets a ticket from a police officer (Morgan Freeman) for operating Dr. Fly's pushcart without a license.
4	"Spidey Up Against the Wall"	June Angela
At a New York Mets baseball game, a mutated half-human, half-wall creature (Jim Boyd) sneaks up behind outfielder "Gumbo" Grace Ivy (Skip Hinnant) and causes him to miss a routine fly ball. The umpire (Morgan Freeman) is also knocked down. Spidey catches the Wall, but is ejected from the ballpark because spectators are not allowed on the field. The opening screenshot shows the Wall bumping Spidey. NOTE: This also aired as part of the last episode of The Electric Company (episode 130B).
5	"Spider-Man Meets the Can Crusher"	Morgan Freeman
Long ago, a young boy visited a soup factory, but lost his pet frog in a vat of tomato soup. As an adult, the Can Crusher (Jim Boyd, sporting a Don King-type hairdo, a large red nose and wearing a black jumpsuit) visits supermarkets to find the can where his beloved frog may be, smashing them with a large hammer, causing a disturbance and a food shortage whenever he destroys cans in his vain efforts. Spidey is called on to help, and the Can Crusher disguises himself as the store manager. Spider-Man initially smashes the Can Crusher into a can display, but the Can Crusher retaliates and returns the blow, knocking Spidey unconscious. After his victory, the Can Crusher tells the viewer his story as told above, then escapes. Spidey then comes to and begins to contemplate how to defeat the Can Crusher the next time.
6	"Spidey Meets the Funny Bunny"	Morgan Freeman
Once an ordinary girl until a bully sat on her Easter basket, a woman dressed in an Easter Bunny costume (Judy Graubart) sets out to steal other children's Easter baskets. She plans to disrupt the annual Easter Egg roll at the White House. Spidey is tipped off and sets a trap that catches her. NOTE: The role of the president is played by Melanie Henderson, who is believed to be one of the first African-American actresses to play the role of a U.S. president on television.
7	"Spidey Meets Dr. Fright"	Hattie Winston
Dr. Fright (Skip Hinnant) is a monster who has a face so frighteningly ugly that he conceals it beneath an oversized stovepipe hat. He uses this to terrify victims, robbing them when they become frozen in fright. He plans to freeze Spidey, but Spidey instead freezes Dr. Fright by holding up a mirror.
8	"Meet Mr. Measles"	Jim Boyd
Mr. Measles (Skip Hinnant), armed with a large bag of measles-causing spots, plans to spread a worldwide epidemic. He infects several people, but Spidey catches him before a large-scale outbreak happens. However, Spidey becomes ill with the measles himself. NOTE: This episode is included on the LP record adaptation of SSS, wherein Jim Boyd portrays both Peter Parker and Spider-Man. This version ends with Spidey commenting to himself, "...Looks like ten days in bed for me!"
9	"Spidey Jumps the Thumper"	Judy Graubart
The Thumper (Hattie Winston) was a spoiled little rich girl who did not get a yellow pony for her birthday. Turning to a life of crime after the cake and ice cream, the Thumper fancies herself as Napoleon Bonaparte. She assaults two citizens (Luis Avalos and Skip Hinnant) with an oversized boxing glove hidden inside her coat a la Napoleon's famous pose. Spidey catches her, but he too is thumped. He regains his senses and traps her in his web. The opening screenshot shows the Thumper landing a blow on Spidey.
10	"Spidey and the Queen Bee"	Morgan Freeman
A half-human, half-bee mutant named The Queen Bee (Hattie Winston) plots to rule the world. Her underlings are also mutated bee-humans (played by Skip Hinnant and Judy Graubart). She plots to release a deadly bee named Fang, which will sting to death whoever stands in her way. Spidey tracks Queen Bee down to her giant hive; there he webs her aide-de-camp, the Beekeeper (Luis Avalos). Her plans thwarted, "Queenie" releases Fang and then makes her escape...while the other mutated bee-humans sting Spider-Man repeatedly. Spidey, covered with sting marks, eventually escapes the hive. The story ends with him still in pursuit of Queen Bee and Fang. NOTE: This episode was included on the LP record of SSS. The audio version (wherein Judy Graubart portrays "Queenie") goes a step further; after Queen Bee "buzzes off", Spidey cures all her mutant-slaves with a web-swatter which he also uses to fight off the bees.
11	"Little Miss Muffett"	TBA
Based on the nursery rhyme. Spidey comes to the rescue of the title character (Hattie Winston) after a large spider terrorizes her. However, Spidey recognizes the spider (a large prop) as an uncle of his, and as they become friends, Miss Muffett leaves in disgust.
12	"The Bookworm"	Skip Hinnant
Easy Reader (Morgan Freeman) is helping his girlfriend, Valerie (Hattie Winston) sort books at the library, when they notice large holes in the books. They try to beat back a large bookworm (a purple and green-striped sock-puppet) by throwing books at it. Spidey arrives in time, but the Bookworm escapes his web. The opening screenshot shows Spidey attempting to stop the Bookworm from eating a book.

=== 1975–76 ===
No.	Title	Narrator
13	"The Birthday Bandit"	Luis Avalos
After two parents set up their son's birthday party, the villainous Birthday Bandit (Jim Boyd) sneaks in and steals all of the cake, ice cream, decorations, and presents, all while describing his actions in Dr. Seuss-style rhyme. When Spidey hears about the theft, he trails the Bandit to the location of his next crime. The Birthday Bandit notices the extra-large cake for the party and guesses that it's a fake that Spidey is using to hide, but the Bandit is bamboozled when the cake turns out to be real. Spidey appears behind him and captures him in his web, saving the birthday.
14	"Spidey Meets the Prankster"	Skip Hinnant
Spidey is visiting the Short Circus at their elementary school when a mysterious series of practical jokes occur--music books are filled with jumping snake puppets, chocolate pies made in Home Economics class are swapped with mud, and the model phone in Secretarial Skills is covered in glue. Spidey decides to alert Principal Prescott (Jim Boyd) of the prank wave, and discovers snakes, the missing pies, and a bottle of paste in his office, proving that Prescott is the Prankster. After being snagged in Spidey's web, the principal confesses, explaining that the kids of the school have played a prank on him every day for years, and he wanted them to get a taste of their own medicine. The chastised students agree to stop their own practical joking, only to subject Prescott to another prank. NOTE: This was also episode 60A's sketch of the day.
15	"Spidey Meets the Blowhard"	Janina Matthews
A man in a tuxedo and cape (Luis Avalos), who fancies himself as the Big Bad Wolf, plots revenge on Fargo North, Decoder (Skip Hinnant) after the detective foiled his plans to blow down Trenton, New Jersey. Meanwhile, Fargo's friends plan a surprise birthday party for him. Later, when Fargo is asked to blow out the candles, the Blowhard crashes the party. Spidey is quickly able to capture the villain, thanks to Paul the Gorilla smashing the birthday cake into the Blowhard's face as he prepares to blow. Spidey and Paul then venture out to buy another cake, since Paul used the original to stun the Blowhard.
16	"Who Stole the Show?"	Todd Graff
Winky Goodyshoes (Hattie Winston) is a has-been actress who bemoans her inability to find suitable work, whereas in her youth she gained captive audiences. As revenge, she decides to "steal the show"--literally--by grabbing the props and costumes from an auditorium where a dress rehearsal is in progress. Spidey catches Winky before she can move the show too far off-Broadway. However, the cast remembers the former child star and they offer her a chance to star in the show as the villain. NOTE: This sketch features a flashback scene of the villain's childhood, with Short Circus member Réjane Magloire making a cameo appearance as the young Winky.
17	"Spidey Meets the Yeti"	Todd Graff
An abominable snowman (Jim Boyd) becomes homesick after wandering away from his home in the Frozen North, and sits on various cold items to help him cope. Spidey sets a trap to catch the Yeti, after which a policeman (Morgan Freeman) wants to take him into custody. Spidey persuades the policeman to let him take the Yeti back home.
18	"Spidey Meets the Mouse"	Janina Mathews
A college student (Skip Hinnant) who does not receive cheese on his Big Mac sandwich dons a giant mouse costume and steals cheese from other cheeseburgers and the tops of pizzas. He then abducts the judge of a large cheese contest (Morgan Freeman) and, stealing his clothes, takes his place at the contest, but before he can run off with the grand prize, Spider-Man snares him in his web. NOTE: For his role as the Mouse, Skip wears the outfit he regularly wore for his character, "Mr. Mouse", who was a regular recurring Electric Company character.
19	"Spidey Meets the Sitter"	Jim Boyd
A burglar (Luis Avalos) uses an old lady's wig and dress in order to get access to people's homes by impersonating a baby sitter, then robbing the house after the kids are asleep. Spidey shows up to foil the faux-granny and sticks around to be an authentic babysitter.
20	"Spidey Fixes the Hum"	June Angela
An aspiring rock star named David Dinger (Luis Avalos) from rock 'n' roll's earliest days would hum his songs because he could not remember the words: critics dub him the Hum Dinger. By 1960, the hits stop coming and he works as an electronics repairman. He defrauds his customers by revealing phony hums in their equipment. Spidey investigates and tracks the Hum down at the home of a customer (Judy Graubart) and her son (Todd Graff), foiling him by leaving a radio turned on until the Hum could no longer maintain his hum.
21	"Spidey Nabs the Sandman"	June Angela
A burglar named the Sandman (Luis Avalos) dresses as sleepwalker Wee Willie Winkie. He sedates and robs his victims by sprinkling magic sand on them. The Sandman happens upon a grand gala with nearly the entire cast. He sprinkles sand on everyone. Spidey arrives and investigates a pile of sand and falls asleep. He awakens and tracks down the Sandman, nabbing him by using the Sandman's sand against him. NOTE: This is not the Sandman from the original Spider-Man comics.
22	"Spidey Meets the Tickler"	Hattie Winston
The Tickler (Luis Avalos) is a bitter failed comedian. He dresses as legendary William Tell and pesters pedestrians with his bad jokes, tickling his helpless victims with feathers and robbing them when they laugh. Spidey corners the Tickler, but he runs out of web. The Tickler tells Spidey jokes, and Spidey pretends to laugh. He tells more jokes until he finds himself arrested. NOTE: This episode contained the Tickler's joke which says: Q - Why does a duck have webbed feet? A - Because if he had a webbed head, he'd be Spider-Man!
23	"Spidey Gets the Old One-Two"	June Angela
Conk (Jim Boyd) and Bonk (Luis Avalos) were ordinary third graders until a bully stole their lunches. The duo dress in black suits and derbies and assault their victims: Conk with a large mallet to the head, Bonk with a boxing glove to the stomach, grabbing their victims' lunches before they can recuperate. With a good Samaritan's (Janina Matthews) help, Spidey uses a peanut butter and banana sandwich to set a trap. NOTE: Conk and Bonk were a parody of the Alka-Seltzer commercial running at the time: the personifications of headache (Conk) and upset stomach (Bonk) would assault people who had not been eating right, only to be defeated when the victims would take Alka-Seltzer.
24	"Spidey Meets Eye Patch"	Janina Matthews
Eye Patch (Skip Hinnant) is a pirate with an evil eye, concealed by a patch. Anyone who is exposed to Eye Patch's powers are prompted to do the last thing they would ever want to do. He causes trouble in town. He flashes his eye at Spidey who dances foolishly, allowing Eye Patch to escape. Eye Patch then flashes his eye at a peace-loving flower child (Judy Graubart) who punches him in the cursed eye (the last thing she ever wanted to do was hurt someone), taking away Eye Patch's power and giving him a whole new outlook on life (no pun intended) as he, Spidey, and the flower child walk off together.
25	"Spidey Meets Silly Willy"	Todd Graff
Similar to the Tickler, a failed clown named Silly Willy (Jim Boyd) takes out his frustrations with inane antics such as bopping himself over the head with a rubber chicken. As he causes passers-by (including Hattie Winston and Morgan Freeman) to respond with laughter, he robs them. Spidey captures the evil clown when he attempts his silly antics at a posh dinner party.
26	"The Uninvited"	TBA
As a youngster, the Uninvited (Luis Avalos) is the only child in his class to not be invited to a birthday party. He gets his revenge by inviting himself to parties to rob the guests. One of the Uninvited's victims is J. Arthur Crank (Jim Boyd, cameoing his signature role on The Electric Company) when the Uninvited invites himself to Crank's bath night, stealing his last dry towel and his rubber duckie: the one his friend Ernie gave him. Just as the Uninvited invites himself to steal a construction worker's (Judy Graubart) salary, Spidey extends a special invitation to the Uninvited: to jail, courtesy of his web.
27	"Spidey After the Fox"	Judy Graubart
The Fox (Hattie Winston) is a villain who wears a fox costume (what else?). She prowls the streets, ripping people off...down to and including their clothes. Spidey sets a trap for her, by standing on the street in a trenchcoat with hat and dark glasses. The Fox sneaks up on him and takes the bait. Revealed, Spidey captures her in a web. But then he's hauled off to jail, along with the Fox, for loitering and indecent exposure! "Is this all the thanks our hero gets...? Sometimes he gets less."
28	"Spidey Meets the Sack"	Rodney Lewis
A man dressed in a 100-pound flour sack (Jim Boyd) throws vegetables, cream pies and other food items at people for amusement; the Sack's costume enables him to hide amongst other large sacks, barrels, etc., undetected. Spidey and a local policeman (Morgan Freeman) track the Sack to a bakery, where Spidey believes he is hiding amongst sacks of flour. Spidey and the officer tear open several sacks, but fail to find the Sack as he makes his getaway.

=== 1976–77 ===
No.	Title	Narrator
29	"The Beastly Banana"	Luis Avalos
Jennifer of the Jungle (Judy Graubart) is worried about Paul the Gorilla's recent weird behavior, which she links to tainted bananas—the work of Morgan Freeman's signature Mad Scientist character, who plans to capture Paul and abuse him in a series of experiments. Spidey follows a trail of banana peels and catches up with Paul in the nick of time. Just as Paul is about to eat it, Spidey grabs the tainted fruit. The Mad Scientist tries to flee, but Spidey nails him in his web.

== In other media ==
=== Comics ===
From 1974 to 1982, Marvel Comics published a comic book called Spidey Super Stories, which was aimed at children ages 6–10. A total of 57 issues were produced, the first 15 of which were written by Jean Thomas (previously writer of Night Nurse). Jim Salicrup succeeded her as the series writer, and most issues were drawn by Win Mortimer. Thomas and Salicrup remarked that the comic was subject to an exceptionally high level of editorial scrutiny, as staff from both Marvel Comics and the Children's Television Workshop reviewed the stories to ensure they were faithful to the Electric Company and Marvel Comics casts, featured age-appropriate content and reading level and gave significant roles to female characters. Spider-Man signature artist John Romita, Sr. was the Marvel editor of the book and drew some of the covers. During the early years, a comic book version of one of The Electric Company Spidey skits was included. A truncated version also appeared in The Electric Company Magazine. In contrast to the live-action segments on The Electric Company, Spidey often appeared out of costume as Peter Parker.

Every issue of Spidey Super Stories features at least one story where Spidey teams up with an established Marvel Comics superhero and/or fight an established Marvel villain. This served to introduce other Marvel characters to new readers who were unfamiliar with the company's characters prior to seeing Spider-Man on The Electric Company. Most of these stories feature quick origins, usually taking up a single page or less, of both the featured hero and villain. Guest heroes include Iron Man, Captain America, Iceman, Doctor Strange, Spider-Woman, Nova, The Cat and Ms. Marvel. Guest villains include the Green Goblin, the Doctor Doom, Jack O'Lantern, and Thanos.

Other stories in the issue feature regular characters from The Electric Company, such as Easy Reader and detective Fargo North, Decoder, with Spidey as a supporting character. Conversely, The Electric Company characters sometimes appear as supporting characters in the Spidey-centric stories. Supporting characters from other Spider-Man comics made regular appearances as well, such as Peter Parker's girlfriend, Mary Jane Watson, and the staff of Parker's workplace, the Daily Bugle, most notably publisher and editor J. Jonah Jameson.

Marvel parodied Spidey Super Stories in a humorous issue of What If...? For two pages, an alternate universe is shown where Marvel had instead teamed up with the National Endowment of the Arts to produce Spidey Intellectual Stories, where Spider-Man defeats the Mad Thinker by debating philosophy. The Watcher notes that it "is for a [yawn] select audience, to be sure".

=== Film ===
A variant of Thumper, an original character, makes a brief visual cameo in Spider-Man: Across the Spider-Verse as a prisoner in the Spider-Society headquarters. A variant of The Wall was also supposed to appear, but he was cut along with many other villains and Spider-Man/Woman variants.

=== Record ===
Spidey Super Stories was adapted as an audio drama and released on a vinyl record from Peter Pan Records, licensed by Children's Television Workshop. Included on the record are two stories from The Electric Company: "Spidey Versus Mr. Measles" and "The Queen Bee". Other stories include Spidey versus an evil toy-wielding criminal called the Jester in "The Last Laugh", The Purple Pirates and Evil MacWeevil in "The Leader of the Pack" (which includes a cameo of Fargo North, Decoder), and Spidey's origin story. Three other stories feature Spidey with members of the Short Circus, and Pedro and his guard-plant Maurice fighting the Mole Man in "20,000 Feet Under the Ground"; and the group tackling more traditional Marvel Comics villains in "Deadly is the Doctor Called Doom" and "Spidey Versus the Sandman". Due to the lack of a visual presentation, Spidey/Peter Parker speaks, voiced by Jim Boyd. However, the album's artwork features the traditional Spidey-talking technique of having his words in word balloons. Elements such as Spidey's spider-sense and the spider-tracer are used in these stories as well.
