= Out to Lunch (TV program) =

1974 American ABC network TV special

- Written by: Christopher Cerf; Tom Dunsmuir; Clark Gesner; Bryan Joseph; Norman Stiles; Jim Thurman; Tom Whedon
- Directed by: Bill Davis
- Starring: Rita Moreno; Luis Ávalos; Hattie Winston; Morgan Freeman; Skip Hinnant; Judy Graubart; Jim Boyd; Elliott Gould; Barbara Eden; Carol Burnett; Bill Beutel
- Composer: Joe Raposo

Production
- Executive producer: David Connell
- Producer: Norton W. Wright
- Running time: 60 minutes
- Production companies: Children's Television Workshop; Henson Associates

Original release
- Network: ABC
- Release: December 10, 1974

Out to Lunch is a prime-time television special that was broadcast on December 10, 1974, on ABC, from 9 to 10pm ET. It mixed the Sesame Street Muppets and the cast of The Electric Company along with guest stars Elliott Gould, Barbara Eden and Carol Burnett. This is the first and one of the few Sesame Street-related productions directly produced by The Jim Henson Company, then-named Henson Associates (the others being the 1989 television special Sesame Street… 20 Years & Still Counting and the 1999 feature film The Adventures of Elmo in Grouchland).

A member of the Electric Company cast, Rita Moreno, received an Emmy nomination in 1975 for her participation in the show in the category of Outstanding Continuing or Single Performance by a Supporting Actress in Variety or Music.

== Plot ==
In the program, ABC News anchor Bill Beutel and his stage manager wrapped up a newscast and left the studio to take a lunch break. After they leave, the Muppets and the cast of The Electric Company take over the studio to fill an hour of programming on ABC while the studio staff is on break.

== Cast ==
- Luis Ávalos - Casino owner
- Bill Beutel - Himself
- Jim Boyd - Stage manager and gambler
- Carol Burnett - Herself
- Barbara Eden - Herself
- Morgan Freeman - Croupier
- Judy Graubart - Herself
- Elliott Gould - Divorced husband
- Skip Hinnant - Himself and spectator
- Rita Moreno - Herself, divorced wife, and spectator
- Gary Owens - Announcer
- Hattie Winston - Herself

=== Muppet performers ===
- Jim Henson - Kermit the Frog, Ernie, and Guy Smiley
- Richard Hunt - Various
- Jerry Nelson - Herry Monster, Count von Count, and Anything Muppet Dog
- Frank Oz - Bert, Cookie Monster, and Grover
- Caroll Spinney - Oscar the Grouch and Big Bird
