= The Adventures of Letterman =

1970s animated television series

The Adventures of Letterman is a series of animated shorts that was a regular feature on the 1970s PBS educational television series The Electric Company. A superhero spoof created by Mike Thaler, it debuted during the show's second season. Each episode was animated by John Hubley and Faith Hubley and pit the title character, voiced by Gene Wilder, against the "Spell Binder", voiced by Zero Mostel, with Joan Rivers as the narrator. Plots revolve around Spell Binder causing trouble by changing the letter of a word so it means something completely different, then Letterman restoring it. Sixty segments were produced from 1972 to 1976.

Frame from "In the Ink" showing Letterman about to save Timmy from dirty dinner hands by turning "ink" back to "sink".

== Plot ==
In each episode, Joan Rivers narrates the introduction:

Faster than a rolling "O" (running past a big red "O")
Stronger than silent "E" (removing the "e" at the end of "tube")
Able to leap capital "T" in a single bound! (a sign for Tessie's Diner resembling the "T")
It's a word, it’s a plan...it's Letterman!

Then the narrator describes a simple, everyday situation. The Spell Binder expresses disgust at what is occurring and uses his magic wand to change a key letter in a word causing havoc. For example, in one episode a group of people who are enjoying custard have it suddenly become mustard, causing them to turn red and feel burning in their mouths. Spell Binder then revels in his fun.

After the narrator expresses despair at the situation, Letterman—having observed the situation from afar—jumps into action. He replaces the incorrect letter with a more appropriate one that was conveniently placed on his varsity sweater (the narrator would say, for example, "Ripping a 'c' from his varsity sweater..."), after which time the situation was resolved and things went back to normal. Spell Binder expressed disgust and frustration that Letterman once again foiled his fun ("Curses" or some similar line), while Letterman was sometimes invited to join with the people he helped in whatever they were doing.

Sometimes three different words ("watch," "witch," and "itch") would be involved, with Letterman solving the problem created by Spell Binder's mischief by changing the operative word to a third alternative, rather than reinstating the original word.

== Characters ==
- Narrator (voiced by Joan Rivers)
- Letterman (voiced by Gene Wilder) — A a super-powered man wearing a varsity sweater, football helmet, and football socks and shoes. He can run very fast, jump very high and he can fly.
- Spell Binder (voiced by Zero Mostel) — Letterman's arch-enemy, dressed in a white coat and turban. He keeps a magic wand beneath his turban.

== Episodes ==
=== Regular episodes ===
1. The Corniest Concert – (horn, corn, horn)
2. Hands Full – (school bus, octopus, platypus)
3. In a Pickle – (pickle, tickle, pickle)
4. All Washed Up – (tub, tube, tub)
5. A Jarring Experience – (car, jar, car)
6. The Broken Bridge – (bridge, ridge, bridge)
7. Woman Bites Bear – (pear, bear, pear)
8. Monkey Business – (bassoon, baboon, balloon)
9. Sticky Finances – (money, honey, baloney)
10. Singing in the Train – (train, rain, train)
11. The Great Escape – (jail, pail)
12. The Roar of Rage – (cage, age, rage, age, cage)
13. Travels with an Ant – (ant, giant, ant)
14. A Mouse in the House – (mouse, moose, loose)
15. A Rolling Bun Gather No Seeds – (sun, bun, sun)
16. Bigger than Life – (flower, shower, tower)
17. His Just Desserts – (dessert, desert, dessert)
18. What a Dragon – (wagon, dragon, wagon)
19. In the Ink – (sink, ink, sink)
20. Dancing in the Dark – (light, night, light)
21. Custard's Last Stand – (custard, mustard, custard)
22. A Snake in the Grass – (rake, snake, cake)
23. Having a Ball – (gown, clown, crown)
24. Making Time Fly – (watch, witch, itch)
25. A Jolting Experience – (light, lightning, lightning rod)
26. Don't Toy With Me – (boy, toy, boy)
27. Going Ape – (grapes, apes, capes)
28. Far Out – (bars, stars, cigars, stars)
29. A Weighty Problem - (weight, freight, eight)
30. The Wigged Out Lady - (wig, pig, wig)
31. The Plummeting Plant - (plane, plant, plane)
32. The Chase - (car, cart, dart, tart)
33. Putting On Airs – (chair, air, hair)
34. Bookworms (shelves, elves, shelves)
35. The Lady and the Beagle – (beagle, eagle, beagle)
36. Getting Her Goat – (coat, goat, coat)
37. Town in a Jam – (dam, jam, dam)
38. Here Comes the Fudge – (judge, fudge, judge)
39. Putting His Foot In It – (feat, feet, feat)
40. A Shattering Experience – (class, glass, class)
41. - (box, ox, box)
42. A Bum Steer – (cow, plow, sow)
43. A Clean Sweep – (groom, broom, groom)
44. A Rolling Stone - (heels, wheels, heels, eels, heels)
45. (boat, coat, boat)
46. (soup, soap, soup)
47. (waiter, water, waiter)
48. Cool It – (nice, ice, nice)
49. Gone With the Wind – (win, wind, win)
50. Mighty Casey at the Bat – (batter, butter, batter)

=== Special episodes ===
Though nearly all episodes of the segment were stand-alone stories that followed the same general story line, there were some exceptions. One episode functioned as an origin story, portraying Letterman's childhood and growing up. The most notable episodes were the ones where Letterman himself, rather than some innocent victim(s), was the target of Spellbinder's torment. Examples are:

1. In the Beginning – (ball, wall, ball)
2. Silver Threads Among the Bold – (bold, old, bold) - The narrator declares Letterman to be our "bold" hero. Spellbinder removes the "b", leaving "old" and turning Letterman into an aged version of himself. The Spellbinder taunts the aged Letterman, but drops the "b" in the process; Letterman picks it up and re-adds it to the word to change it back to "bold", restoring him to his youthful condition.
3. - (hero, zero, hero)
4. Betterman OR It's Hard to Keep A Good Man Down - (Letterman, wetterman, betterman) – Spellbinder changes the "L" in "Letterman" to a "w" ("wetterman"), causing Letterman to struggle in a pool to keep from drowning. Letterman is somehow able to find a "b" and replace the "w" to make "Betterman" ("better man than he was before").
5. A Branch Office - (good, wood, good) - Letterman declares he feels "good". Spellbinder changes the "g" to a "w" for "wood", turning Letterman into a talking tree. Spellbinder then proceeds to get a drill to try to drill holes in Letterman. Before Spellbinder returns, Letterman is able to convince a small bird to take a "g" from his front and replace the "w", thereby turning him back into the "feeling-good" Letterman, just in time as Spellbinder attempts to drill into him. The drill breaks and engulfs Spellbinder in the twisted metal.
6. Small Talk - (trunk, junk, shrunk, hunk) – Spell Binder sneaks into Letterman's home in order to exact revenge for being foiled, time and time again. He spies upon Letterman, who happens to be packing away all of his letters into a trunk as he prepares to go on vacation. Spell Binder changes the "trunk" into "junk," then proceeds to shrink Letterman down to six inches tall by changing "junk" into "shrunk." However, Letterman takes action and removes the "s" and "r," changing "shrunk" into "hunk," which restores his college-football-player physique. Letterman defeats Spell Binder by bending his wand, rendering it useless and setting Spell Binder to breaking down and sobbing hysterically.
7. A Friend In Need – (fiend, friend) - a re-composed Spell Binder has been placed behind bars. The narrator of the episode declares, "This looks like the end of a fiend," which inspires Spell Binder to use his bent wand as a letter "r" to change "fiend" into "friend." A strange-looking monster appears and the narrator exclaims, "I didn't know he had any friends!" to which Spell Binder answers back: "We went to school together." The monster bends the bars of Spell Binder's prison cell, allowing him to slip out and escape.

== Parodies ==
Letterman was parodied as the live-action Litterman during the sixth season of The Electric Company. In the lone segment, the Spoil Binder changes a woman sitting on a park bench ("sitter") into a pile of garbage ("litter"). After the litter begins reeking, Litterman arrives to correct the situation.

In that one-time parody skit, Jim Boyd played the Spoil Binder and Skip Hinnant played Litterman.

== Criticism ==
Jack Shaheen, Professor Emeritus of Mass Communication at Southern Illinois University, criticized the Spell Binder as a negative racial stereotype "who resembles those turbaned Arabs in the escapist Arabian Nights films of the fifties and sixties." Shaheen finds these segments discontinuous with Sesame Workshop's realistic portrayals of other minorities.
