= J. Arthur Rank =

English industrialist (1888–1972)

The Right Honourable The Lord Rank
- Born: 22 December 1888; Kingston upon Hull, Yorkshire, England
- Died: 29 March 1972 (aged 83); Winchester, Hampshire, England
- Years active: 1932–1972
- Known for: Founder of the Rank Organisation

Joseph Arthur Rank, 1st Baron Rank (22 December 1888 – 29 March 1972) was an English industrialist who was head and founder of The Rank Organisation.

== Family business ==
Joseph Arthur Rank was born on 22 December 1888 in Kingston upon Hull to Joseph Rank, a miller and philanthropist, and Emily Rank (née Voase; c. 1855–1916).

He was educated at The Leys School in Cambridge. Joseph is reported to have told his son Arthur that he was "a dunce at school" and that the only way that he could succeed in life would be in his father's flour mill.

J. Arthur ventured on his own with Peterkins Self-Raising Flour, but when that business failed he returned to work for his father. That was the business (Joseph Rank Limited) that he later inherited and which became known as Rank Hovis McDougall (now owned by British food conglomerate Premier Foods).

== Religious challenge ==
Rank was a devout member of the Methodists and in his middle age he taught at Sunday School to which he began to show religious films. This practice expanded to other churches and schools and it led to his formation of the Religious Film Society in 1933 to which he then distributed films that he had also made. His first production was called Mastership.

When the Methodist Times newspaper began to complain about the negative influence that British and American films shown in Britain were having on family life, their editorial was answered by the London Evening News who suggested that instead of complaining, the Methodist Church should provide a solution. Rank took up the challenge and via an introduction by a young film producer named John Corfield, he discussed both the problem and a solution with Lady Yule of Bricket Wood. The net result of these meetings was the formation of the British National Films Company.

The first commercial production by this company was Turn of the Tide (1935), a film based upon a 1932 novel by Leo Walmsley called Three Fevers. Having created their film, British National then had to get it distributed and exhibited, but this proved to be more difficult. Some commercial screens began showing Turn of the Tide as a second feature, but this was not enough exposure for the company to make a profit.

== Pinewood Film Studios ==
Having first created a film production company and having made a movie at another studio, Rank, Lady Yule and John Corfield began talking to Charles Boot who had recently bought the estate of Heatherden Hall at Iver Heath, Buckinghamshire, for the purpose of turning it into a movie studio that would rival those in Hollywood.

In 1935, the trio became owner-operators of Pinewood Film Studios. Lady Yule later sold her shares to Rank while John Corfield resigned from its board of directors.

== Commercial challenge ==
The problems encountered in the distribution of Turn of the Tide were addressed when Rank discovered that the people who controlled the British film industry had ties to the American movie industry and that for all practical purposes he was shut out of his own domestic market. American films occupied 80% of British screen time during the era before World War II.

In 1935 Rank arrived at a solution to his distribution problems. Because the middlemen controlled the distribution pipeline from production to exhibition, he decided to buy a large part of both the distribution and exhibition systems. He began by forming a partnership with film maker C. M. Woolf to form General Film Distributors, which in 1936 was incorporated in Rank's General Cinema Finance Corporation but continued to handle all distribution for the Rank organisation until 1955, when it was renamed J. Arthur Rank Film Distributors.

== Rank Organisation ==
In 1939 Rank consolidated his film production interests in both the Pinewood Film Studios and the Denham Film Studios. In 1938 Rank bought the Odeon Cinemas chain and the Amalgamated Studios in Borehamwood, although the latter were never used as film studios by Rank. In 1941, it absorbed Gaumont-British, which owned 251 cinemas, and the Lime Grove Studios (later bought by BBC Television) and acquired the Paramount Cinemas chain, so that by 1942 the Rank Organisation owned 619 cinemas. Other interests were acquired (such as the Bush Radio company in 1949) which would be added to the interests in a few more years within a new company called the Rank Organisation. Rank retired as Chairman in 1962 and was succeeded by John Davis, who had been Managing Director since 1948.

It was then that Rank developed the special prism needed to make the Sodium Vapour Process of film matte special effects technique work. This analogue method used amber light to mask images so they could be placed over a different background. The prism caused light to be split into two beams where two film strips would record the same image on both black & white and colour film. There were only three of these prisms ever made and were licensed by Rank for use by Walt Disney Studios. This process was first used for the 1964 film Mary Poppins since it had superior colour and blur allowances. The last known film to use this process was Dick Tracy (1990).

== Films ==
During the 1940s, the companies Rank controlled produced some of the finest British films of the period, including: The Life and Death of Colonel Blimp (1943), Henry V (1944), A Matter of Life and Death (1946), Black Narcissus (1947), and The Red Shoes (1948). From the 1950s, fewer adventurous film projects were attempted and Rank concentrated on producing solidly commercial ventures, mainly aimed at the family market. These include the popular Norman Wisdom comedies and the Doctor... films. However some more serious films were produced during this era including: Carve Her Name With Pride (1958), A Night to Remember (also 1958) and Victim (1961), as well as a clutch of prestige topics such as the coronation of Elizabeth II in 1953 and filmed performances by The Royal Ballet.

== Core interests and legacy ==
Although his critics claimed that many of the films that he had produced under the name of Rank were not exactly in keeping with his original intention of producing "family-friendly" films (which John Davis had said was company policy) to challenge American competition, he nevertheless kept to his core beliefs. To that end in 1953 he set up the J. Arthur Rank Group Charity to promote Christian belief. The charity later became known as The Rank Foundation. He was a governor of The Peckham Experiment in 1949.

He has been described as "the Sunday school-teaching nepo baby whose passion for Britain and God led him to blow (or, rather, dent) his father’s mill owning-fortune on a film empire that aimed, and failed, to beat Hollywood at its own game."

In 1957, J. Arthur Rank was raised to the Peerage of the United Kingdom as The 1st Baron Rank, of Sutton Scotney in the County of Southampton (Sutton Scotney is a small village between Andover and Winchester in Hampshire).

=== Rank Foundation and prizes ===
Rank and his wife were philanthropists who performed a lot of charitable work, and in 1953 they founded the J. Arthur Rank Group Charity, now The Rank Foundation. The Foundation continues to support activities which encourage, develop and support young people, and other disadvantaged groups. It also supports activities promoting Christian principles through media such as film. As of July 2020 there are three chairpersons of the organisation: Rank's son-in-law, Robin Cowen, and his grandsons Fred Packard and Joey Newton.

Donations were made from The Rank Foundation to endow The Rank Prize Funds, established shortly before Rank's death, on 16 February 1972. The two Funds, the Human and Animal Nutrition and Crop Husbandry Fund and the Optoelectronics Fund, support sciences reflecting Rank's business interests through his "connection with the flour-milling and cinema and electronics industries", and also because Rank believed that they would be of great benefit to humanity. There are two Rank Prizes, and the Funds also recognise, support and foster excellence among young people in the two fields of nutrition and optoelectronics. The Rank Prize for Optoelectronics supports, encourages, and rewards researchers working at the cutting edge of optoelectronics research, initially (from 1976) awarded annually, now a biennial prize worth £30,000. The Rank Prize for Nutrition was awarded at various intervals since 1976, but now also awarded biennially, and worth £40,000.

The Arthur Rank Centre was founded in 1972 with the support of the Rank Foundation to provide resources, training, and advocacy for rural Christians, rural churches and the communities they serve, across England and Wales.

=== Rank Fellowship ===
Inspired by his personal knowledge of the Brazilian Fundação Estudar, the Rank Fellowship was created in 2003 by Rank's eldest grandson, Fred Arthur Rank Packard, who became Chairman of the Rank Foundation in 2000. Fred was one of the founders of the Brazilian investment banking firm Banco Garantia, along with Jorge Paulo Lemann, Marcel Telles and Carlos Alberto Sicuperia.

== Family ==
In 1917, Rank married Hon. Laura Ellen ("Nell"; 1890–1971), daughter of the publisher and newspaper distributor Horace Brooks Marshall, 1st Baron Marshall of Chipstead. They had two daughters, Shelagh (who was married first to Fred Packard who lived in Hollywood, and then to Robin Cowen) and Ursula (born 1920). When he died in March 1972, aged 83, his barony became extinct.

== In popular culture ==
J. Arthur Rank's name was parodied on the PBS children's educational TV show The Electric Company as "J. Arthur Crank" (voiced and later performed by Jim Boyd), a character wearing a plaid shirt, suspenders and a porkpie hat, who was in a perpetually cranky mood (hence his name) whenever he interrupted sketches to complain when spellings or pronunciations confused him or when he was mistaken for someone else.

The Lady Rank was honored by the Royal National Lifeboat Institution for the couple's charitable work in the naming of a Tyne-class lifeboat, The Lady Rank (ON 1114), stationed at Angle Lifeboat Station in Pembrokeshire, Wales from 1987 to 2008, due in part to generous donations by the Rank Foundation to the RNLI. Their daughter Shelagh Cowan (née Rank) served as sponsor of the boat.

"J. Arthur Rank" has also been used as cockney rhyming slang, both for "bank" and "wank" (slang for masturbation), typically shortened to "J. Arthur" or just "Arthur". In golf, especially in the United Kingdom, a "J. Arthur" is slang for a shank.

== Arms ==
Coat of arms of J. Arthur Rank
Crest In front of a griffin's head couped Argent and beaked Or three human hearts Gules. Escutcheon Ermine on a fess Sable double cottised Gules three lions rampant Or. Supporters On the dexter side a pointer dog and on the sinister a black labrador dog both Proper. Motto Fortiter Et Recte

Peerage of the United Kingdom
New creation	Baron Rank; 1957–1972	Extinct
