= Ned Blessing: The True Story of My Life =

1992 film

- Genre: Western
- Written by: William D. Wittliff
- Directed by: Peter Werner
- Starring: Daniel Baldwin; Luis Avalos; Chris Cooper
- Theme music composer: Basil Poledouris
- Country of origin: United States
- Original language: English

Production
- Executive producer: William D. Wittliff
- Producer: Paul D. Goldman
- Production locations: Austin, Texas; Spicewood, Texas
- Cinematography: Neil Roach
- Editor: Mark S. Westmore
- Running time: 97 min.
- Production companies: Wittliff / Pangaea; Hearst Entertainment Productions

Original release
- Network: CBS
- Release: April 14, 1992
- Release: August 18 – September 15, 1993

Ned Blessing: The Story of My Life and Times is a 1992 made-for-TV movie filmed near Austin, Texas starring Daniel Baldwin. The score was composed by Basil Poledouris.

The story is narrated by Ned, now a crusty old man who, fed up with the distortions of newspaper "scribblers" writing about the Southwestern United States, decides to take pen to paper and tell "the true story of my life". Crossing the Great Plains in Texas with his father (Chris Cooper), young Ned (Sean Baca) is kidnapped by a brutal gang of Comancheros and, fortuitously, placed in the care of a Mexican-Indian mystic named Crecencio (Luis Avalos). This wily sage teaches the boy how to survive—and how to lie and steal, so that he becomes known as the Texas boy bandit.

Young Ned will later find his father, being cared for by the equally young Jilly Blue (Taylor Fry), a barroom singer partial to ditties like "Beautiful Dreamer". Time passes, and the adult Ned, played by Daniel Baldwin, is now the sheriff of Plum Creek. His father is the local music teacher.

All seems peaceful again until Jilly (Julia Campbell), who had been kidnapped by her piano player, returns as an international singing star. What promises to be romantic fulfillment ends in disaster, including a bloody massacre that leaves Ned swearing revenge.

In 1993 there was a TV miniseries of the same name starring Brad Johnson as Ned Blessing. There were only four episodes made, which were shown on four consecutive Wednesdays after its initial premiere in 1993.
