= Rural Coalition (England) =

Alliance of English countryside organisations

The Rural Coalition is composed of thirteen organisations who have a shared outlook on how England should be developed to support those living and working in the countryside.

== Members ==
In March 2024 the coalition members were listed as:

- Action with Communities in Rural England
- Arthur Rank Centre
- Campaign to Protect Rural England, or CPRE the Countryside Charity
- Country Land & Business Association
- National Association of Local Councils
- National Farmers Union
- National Housing Federation
- Plunkett Foundation
- Royal Institution of Chartered Surveyors
- Royal Town Planning Institute
- Rural Services Network
- Town and Country Planning Association
- National Centre for Rural Health and Care

== Presidents ==
Helen-Ann Hartley, Bishop of Newcastle, was appointed president of the Rural Coalition in 2025, replacing the first president, Alan Smith, Bishop of St Albans.
