= Gregg Burge =

American tap dancer and choreographer (1957–1998)

- Born: November 14, 1957; Merrick, New York; U.S.
- Died: July 4, 1998 (aged 40); Atlanta, Georgia; U.S.
- Occupations: Dancer, Actor, Singer, Choreographer
- Years active: 1972–1998

Gregg Burge (November 14, 1957 – July 4, 1998) was an American tap dancer, choreographer, actor and singer.

== Early life ==
Burge was born in New York City and raised on Long Island, N.Y.

He chose a career in song and dance after seeing Sammy Davis Jr. on the Ed Sullivan Show. At age 7, he persuaded his parents to enroll him in tap classes at the Red Slipper Dance Studio in Merrick, N.Y. By age 10, he was winning local talent shows and was a three-time winner on ''The Ted Mack Amateur Hour'' on television. By 13, Burge was earning $30,000 a year.

Burge won a scholarship to study at the Juilliard School when he was 17. He graduated from New York's Fiorello H. LaGuardia High School of Performing Arts in 1975.

== Career ==
His credits ranged from television's The Electric Company to the film version of A Chorus Line (1985), for which he served as assistant to choreographer Jeffrey Hornaday and performed the role of Richie. He reprised his role of Richie on Broadway.

Television commercials followed, along with a job as a regular on ''The Electric Company'' and, at 13, a stint in the Off Broadway musical ''Bojangles.'' There he learned dance history firsthand, appearing with tap stars like Chuck Green, Rhythm Red and Mabel Lee, who taught him to improvise rather than simply dance steps. Mr. Burge received formal training in ballet and tap from the High School of the Performing Arts and the Juilliard School.

Burge was nominated for two Drama Desk Awards, twice won the Fred Astaire Award for his Broadway performances in Song and Dance and Oh, Kay!. He received a Tony Award nomination for his role in Oh, Kay!. He performed as the Scarecrow for four years in the Broadway production of The Wiz and appeared in the long-running Sophisticated Ladies.

Burge choreographed Michael Jackson's "Bad" music video with Jeffrey Daniel and a video for reggae band Steel Pulse. He operated a dance studio on Long Island.

== Death ==
Burge died of a brain tumor in Atlanta on July 4, 1998, at age 40.

== Filmography ==
Year	Title	Role
1985	A Chorus Line	Richie
1988	School Daze	Virgil Cloyd
1996	Soul of the Game	Bill Robinson
