= I Go Pogo =

- Publicity poster for 'I Go Pogo'
- Directed by: Marc Paul Chinoy
- Written by: Marc Paul Chinoy
- Produced by: Marc Paul Chinoy
- Starring: Jonathan Winters; Vincent Price; Ruth Buzzi; Stan Freberg; Jimmy Breslin; Skip Hinnant
- Cinematography: Robert W. Starbird
- Edited by: Michael Usher
- Music by: Gary Baker; Thom Flora
- Production companies: Stowmar Enterprises; Possum Productions Inc.
- Distributed by: 21st Century Film Corporation
- Release date: August 1, 1980
- Running time: 82 minutes
- Country: United States
- Language: English
- Budget: $2 million

I Go Pogo (also known as Pogo for President) is a 1980 American stop motion comedy film written and directed by Marc Paul Chinoy based on the comic strip Pogo by Walt Kelly.

== Plot ==
Pogo the Possum attempts to run for president with the help of his fellow animal friends.

== Cast ==
- Skip Hinnant as Pogo Possum
- Jonathan Winters as Porky Pine / Molester Mole / Wiley Catt
- Bob McFadden as Howland Owl
- Vincent Price as Deacon Mushrat
- Jimmy Breslin as P.T. Bridgeport
- Stan Freberg as Albert Alligator
- Ruth Buzzi as Miz Beaver / Miss Mam'selle Hepzibah
- Arnold Stang as Churchy LaFemme
- Len Maxwell as Bewitched Bat / Seminole Sam / Narrator
- Bob Kaliban as Bewitched Bat
- Marcia Savella as Miz Beetle
- Mike Schultz as Fremount the Boy Bug

== Production ==
The film was announced in January 1980. Kerry H. Stowell, president of Stowmar Enterprises, a film studio in Crystal City, Virginia that produced the feature-length picture on a budget of $2 million. The film was the first feature-length animation shot with a new technique called "flexiform," which involves the manipulation of three-dimensional plasticine figures Marc Paul Chinoy, an animator on TV commercials and letter segments on Sesame Street, introduced Stowell to the technique and became her partner in producing educational and industrial films. Shooting on the picture took about a year, but planning for it had taken more than a year before that with the two discussing possible applications for the "flexiform" technique when the two agreed on adapting Walt Kelly's Pogo comic strip The two contacted Kelly's widow, Selby Kelly, regarding the rights and after showing her the studio she was impressed enough that she broke off her negotiations with NBC and MGM regarding an animated TV adaptation. Kelly remained involved throughout production approving the models and suggesting changes. During the writing process, Chinoy used Kelly's strips as a guideline and didn't invent any new situations that didn't directly tie back to the source material.

Stephen Chiodo worked as an animation director on the film.

== Release ==
The film had been intended to be released three months before the 1980 United States presidential election with a $1 million marketing budget as well as a write-in campaign for "Pogo for President", but 21st Century Film Corporation never delivered on their promise and instead released the film on videocassette via Fotomat's video rental service on August 1, 1980.

Walt Disney Home Video would reissue the film in 1984 on VHS under the alternate title of Pogo for President; this was the first Walt Kelly-related product with involvement from Disney since Kelly left the company in 1941

Two versions of the film exist, one being the unaltered original and the other a re-edit with added narration.
