= Space Force (TV pilot) =

1978 American science fiction television pilot

- title card
- Genre: comedy / science fiction
- Written by: John Boni; Norman Stiles
- Directed by: Peter Baldwin
- Starring: Fred Willard
- Theme music composer: Artie Butler
- Country of origin: United States
- Original language: English
- No. of episodes: 1

Production
- Producers: John Boni; Norman Stiles
- Cinematography: Robert Hoffman
- Editor: Albert P. Wilson
- Running time: 24 mins
- Production company: Columbia Pictures Television

Original release
- Network: NBC
- Release: April 28, 1978

Space Force is a science fiction television pilot starring Fred Willard for the NBC television network. It aired as a one-off on April 28, 1978, but the series was not picked up. The pilot set up a scenario not unlike The Phil Silvers Show in which opportunistic Captain Thomas Woods (Willard) leads his starcraft crew in schemes under the nose of the overbearing Captain Leon Stoner and dotty station Commander Irving Hinkley (William Phipps). Actor Phipps stated the show was originally titled Fort Leo (after the name of the ship), and claimed it was passed over because of the short-lived series Buck Henry produced, Quark, which was cancelled even before Space Force was aired.

== Plot synopsis ==
Aboard space station Fort Leo Captain Thomas Woods (Willard) arranges a carnival to raise money for a children's hospital on planet Triton by selling unauthorized military equipment to civilians and joyrides on their starcraft. Meanwhile, Captain Leon Stoner presses station Commander Irving Hinkley to go to war with the planet Algon over the capture of a spy.

== Cast ==
- William Phipps as Commander Irving Hinkley
- Fred Willard as Captain Thomas Woods
- Larry Block as Private Arnold Fleck
- Jim Boyd as Captain Leon Stoner
- Hilly Hicks as Captain Robert Milford
- Maureen Mooney as Sergeant Eve Bailey
- Joseph G. Medalis as Lieutenant Kabar
- Richard Paul as D.O.R.C. (voice)
- Billy Braver as Berkovitz
- Deborah Harmon as Ship's Crier
- Zitto Kazann as War Minister Dalan
- Patricia Noble as Merivac (voice)

== Legacy ==
Fred Willard reprised his role from the pilot in a comedy sketch for Jimmy Kimmel Live! in 2018 and 2019. First, as interviewed by Kimmel after the announcement of the formation of the United States Space Force, and again in response to a media soundbite from Senator Ted Cruz about a need for the U.S. Space Force to battle "space pirates" in which Willard appears in a trailer for "Space Force 2 - Attack of the Space Pirates," a sequel to the failed 1978 series. Willard portrayed an unrelated character for the 2020 Netflix series Space Force.
