= Danny Seagren =

American actor and puppeteer (1943–2025)

- Born: Daniel Morley Seagren; November 15, 1943; Minneapolis, Minnesota, USA, U.S.
- Died: November 10, 2025 (aged 81); Little River, South Carolina, U.S.
- Occupations: Puppeteer; actor
- Years active: 1969–1996

Daniel Morley Seagren (November 15, 1943 – November 10, 2025) was an American puppeteer and actor.

== Life and career ==
Seagren was born in Minneapolis on November 15, 1943, the son of Morley R. Seagren and Carol C. (Linner).

Seagren was the first person to portray Spider-Man in recorded live-action, appearing in the Spidey Super Stories sketches in the 1970s children's television series The Electric Company, joining the main cast during its fourth season (1974-75) and stayed until the series end in 1977.

Seagren also portrayed Big Bird on Sesame Street for a number of episodes during the 1960s.

Seagren died on November 10, 2025, at the age of 81.
