= Love of Chair =

Recurring soap-opera parody sketch on the US TV show The Electric Company

Love of Chair was a recurring sketch on the television program The Electric Company. Written by actor Paul Dooley, it was seen primarily during the 1971–1972 season. The sketch was a parody of classic soap operas, and spoofed numerous aspects of these shows:

- The name of the sketch was based on the long-running TV soap opera Love of Life.
- The unseen announcer for the sketch was Ken Roberts, who at one time had been the announcer for Love of Life.
- The sketch featured background organ music similar in style to that of classic radio soap operas, including the use of dramatic strings during a key portion of the sketch.

== Format ==
The scene was always set in a room with bare featureless walls and floors, and focused on the actions of a boy (played by Skip Hinnant, age 30, dressed as a pre-teenaged child). In the early sketches, the only other visible objects in the room were a simple wooden chair in which the boy usually sat, and a paneled door in the background. Later sketches occasionally included one or two additional inanimate objects, but the chair would always be visible in the shot during each sketch. During the regular sketches, the boy never spoke; the only voice heard was that of the off-screen announcer.

The format of each sketch was very simple, and showed very little variation over the course of the first season (with the notable exception of the final episode). Each episode began with a brief introduction by the announcer (featuring a title card for the sketch), for example: "Love of Chair. Can a boy from a small chair in a big room find happiness as a top dog in a pet shop?" (Each episode had a different set of humorous "opposites": "an understudy in an overcoat," "a carhop at a bus stop," "a VIP in the FBI," etc. Later episodes began this introduction with "The drama that asks the question: Can a boy..." and later "The story that asks the question...") The introduction continued: "As our story begins (sometimes "When we last met the boy"), the boy is sitting", the shot would open on the boy in the room, with quiet organ music playing in the background. Initially, the boy would hold himself absolutely still while looking off-camera. After a moment's pause, the boy would move and/or perform a simple action (e.g., stand up, sit down, pick up the chair, etc.) and stop again. While the boy was motionless, the unseen announcer would use a short phrase to describe the boy's most recent action in the style of the old Dick and Jane primers, and in a dramatic tone of voice ("The boy stands up!"). After the announcer had completed this description, the boy would perform another movement or action, and would pause again while the announcer described that action.

After the boy had performed several actions and the announcer had described all of them, the background music became much more dramatic and the camera would zoom in on the motionless boy. The announcer would ask several rhetorical questions about what might happen to the boy, the chair, and sometimes the viewers, again in a very dramatic tone of voice: "Will the boy stand up again? Will the chair break? Will you break the chair?" The announcer's final question (punctuated with a sting of organ music) was always ”And...what about Naomi?“ (echoing a similar usage by Gary Owens on Rowan & Martin's Laugh-In). The announcer would then state, “For the answer to these and other questions” — after which the image would then briefly jump-cut outside of the featureless room to one of the other cast members of The Electric Company asking a quick non-sequitur (e.g., "Did the bell ring?", "Who needs it?", "You got a minute?"). The image would then jump-cut back to the room with the boy and the chair, with the announcer (apparently unaware of the interruption) concluding, "Tune in tomorrow for Love of Chair!" In the season 1 finale, the last question was posed by the boy, who asked the announcer what he did not say before by mentioning Naomi, "What about... what's her face?".

Selected scenes from "Love of Chair" served as the background for the Friday closing credits during the first season.

== Naomi ==
The Naomi mentioned in the segment refers to Naomi Foner, who was a producer on the show during the first two seasons and is the mother of actors Maggie Gyllenhaal and Jake Gyllenhaal.

== Final Love of Chair skit ==
In the final “Chair” sequence, which was shown only in season 2, the sketch started normally. However, right after the sketch started the boy turned to face the camera and angrily interrupted the announcer who just said as always, "As our story begins, the boy is sitting." to declare, "No, he isn't! The boy is quitting!" The background organ music suddenly stopped, and the camera changed to show the door in the background. The boy slammed down his baseball cap and quickly walked across the room and through the door, slamming it loudly behind him. After a moment's silence, the shocked announcer sputtered, "But...what about Naomi?" The scene then faded to black—and reopened on the entire cast of The Electric Company standing on a stage under a banner that read, "What about Naomi?" The cast sang a brief song that repeatedly asked "What about Naomi?" along with other questions about her ("Is she thin?" "Is she fat?"). The final lines of the song ran "What about Naomi? What about Naomi? We shall never know." This was one of the last two Love of Chair segments in which Hinnant spoke, and the song that played was never broadcast again.
