= Arthur Rank Centre =

Ecumenical christian charity

The Arthur Rank Centre is an ecumenical national charity which provides resources, training, and advocacy for rural Christians, rural churches and the communities they serve, across England and Wales. It was originally based at Stoneleigh Park in Warwickshire. before moving, and is now to be found in Barford, near Warwick.

It was established in 1972 shortly after the death of the benefactor and film producer J. Arthur Rank, who had been an active methodist teaching at Sunday schools.

The Arthur Rank Centre serves both the spiritual and practical needs of the rural community through resources for rural churches, including a comprehensive range of worship resources and rural stories. It has run a popular training course called "The Rural Mission and Ministry Course" for over 40 years, along with a more in-depth "Germinate Leadership" programme to develop rural church leaders across all Christian denominations.

Many charities have been formed and supported within the pool of the Arthur Rank Centre, including

  - The Rural Housing Trust,
  - The Farming Community Network (in partnership with the Agricultural Christian Fellowship),
  - The Rural Stress Information Network (now a part of FCN),
  - The National Churches Tourism Group,
  - The Addington Fund,
  - The Centre for Studies in Rural Ministry,
  - Eco-Congregation - now Eco-Church run by A Rocha,
  - Computers for Rural People, and
  - The National Care Farming Initiative later to become Care Farming UK and now Social Farms and Gardens (in association with Harper Adams University & The University of Essex)

There have been various CEO's for the charity including Revd Dr Gordon Gatward (1999-2013) awarded an OBE for services to the Farming communities, and later a Lifetime Achievement award from Farmers Weekly, Jerry Marshall (2013-2018), Revd Claire Maxim (2018-2022) and presently Revd Matt Jeffrey (2022-).

For many years, the Anglican, Methodist and URC National Rural officers were based within the charity. Most recently, these posts ceased, aside from the Rural Mission and Ministry Officer for the Methodist Church.

Resources are produced regularly

For many years, the charity produced a paid for magazine known as Country Way. In 2023, this switched to an online offering known as Country Way news and can be received free of charge..

It is also a member of the Rural Coalition along with 13 other national charities and organisations.
