= Mike Thaler =

American writer and illustrator (1936–2024)

Michael Charles Thaler
- Born: October 8, 1936; Los Angeles, California, U.S.
- Died: March 23, 2024 (aged 87); Yakima, Washington, U.S.
- Education: University of California

Michael Charles Thaler (October 8, 1936 – March 23, 2024) was an American author and illustrator of children's books. He published over 220 books between 1961 and 2020.

== Early life ==
Thaler was born at Queen of Angels Hospital in Los Angeles, California, United States, the son of Benjamin and Jean Thaler. He graduated in 1955 from Fairfax High School in Los Angeles, CA., and subsequently attended the University of California at Los Angeles and the Art Center College of Design, now located in Pasadena, California, majoring in English and Art.

== Career ==
In November 1960, Thaler wrote and illustrated a Christmas themed cartoon which he submitted to Harper's Bazaar called The Fallen Star. It was published in the December 1960 issue. That same month, he was asked to submit a manuscript for a children's book to Ursula Nordstrom, an editor at Harper and Brothers, after she read The Fallen Star. Nordstrom decided to publish his manuscript, called Magic Boy, in 1961. This was his first published book. Nordstrom selected three of Thaler's manuscripts to publish in 1962 and 1963: The Clown's Smile, Penny Pencil and Moon Boy. All were illustrated by Thaler.

== Death ==
Thaler died March 23, 2024, at the age of 87.

== Works ==
=== Children's books ===
For 28 years, from 1961 to 1989, 76 books by Thaler were published, including 37 riddle books illustrated by the author, who was dubbed "America's Riddle King" by the Arizona Republic newspaper.

In 1981, an editor at Avon Books, Jean Feiwel, paired Thaler with Jared Lee to illustrate Thaler's latest manuscript, A Hippopotamus Ate the Teacher. This partnership would eventually produce over 100 books.

=== Collaborations ===
Thaler also collaborated with many illustrators, producing the following works:

- My Little Friend, (1971) illustrated by Arnie Levin
- The Staff (1971) illustrated by Joseph Schindelman
- How Far Will A Rubber Band Stretch? (1974) illustrated by Jerry Joyner
- What Can A Hippopotamus Be?, (1975) illustrated by Robert Grossman,
- Owly,(1982) illustrated by David Wieser
- Hippo Lemonade (1986) illustrated by Maxie Chambliss (3-book series 1983, 1984 & 1986)
- Pack 109 (1988) illustrated by Normand Chartier
- Never Mail an Elephant, (1994) illustrated by Jerry Smath

=== Television ===
Between 1971 and 1973, Thaler met with PBS's The Electric Company's Television Animation Director, Edith Zornow, to present an idea for a new series called "The Adventures of Letterman". The show premiered during season two, animated by John and Faith Hubley. It featured a flying superhero in a varsity sweater and a football helmet, who repeatedly foiled the Spell Binder, an evil magician who makes mischief by changing or removing letters to make new words, i.e.HEELS became WHEELS. The Letterman segments featured the voices of Zero Mostel, Joan Rivers and Gene Wilder. (6b) Thaler wrote the scripts for the first two seasons; twenty episodes in total.

=== Jell-O Reading Rocket ===
In 1989, Thaler was chosen to launch the Jell-O Reading Rocket in Lansing, Michigan. This program was sponsored by General Foods USA and Jell-O Desserts. He visited elementary schools throughout the country as one of the authors for the Jello Reading Rocket program for one year.

=== The Black Lagoon series ===
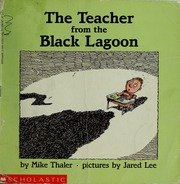
Front cover of "The Teacher from the Black Lagoon"

In 1989, a picture book entitled The Teacher From the Black Lagoon, written by Thaler and illustrated by Jared Lee, was published by Scholastic.

From 1989 to 2026, The Black Lagoon picture book series adds 21 more titles, with 3 of the titles receiving International Reading Children's Choice Awards: The Cafeteria Lady (1992), The Music Teacher (2001) & The Custodian (2002).

The series is made up of;

- Black Lagoon #01 - The Teacher from the Black Lagoon (1989)
- Black Lagoon #02 - The Principal from the Black Lagoon (1993)
- Black Lagoon #03 - The Gym Teacher from the Black Lagoon (1994)
- Black Lagoon #04 - The School Nurse from the Black Lagoon (1995)
- Black Lagoon #05 - The Librarian from the Black Lagoon (1997)
- Black Lagoon #06 - The Cafeteria Lady from the Black Lagoon (1998)
- Black Lagoon #07 - The School Bus Driver from the Black Lagoon (1999)
- Black Lagoon #08 - The Music Teacher from the Black Lagoon (2000)
- Black Lagoon #09 - The Custodian from the Black Lagoon (2001)
- Black Lagoon #10 - The Class from the Black Lagoon (2002)
- Black Lagoon #11 - The Art Teacher from the Black Lagoon (2003)
- Black Lagoon #12 - The Class Pet from the Black Lagoon (2003)
- Black Lagoon #13 - The Bully from the Black Lagoon (2004)
- Black Lagoon #14 - The New Kid from the Black Lagoon (2004)
- Black Lagoon #15 - The Dentist from the Black Lagoon (2005)
- Black Lagoon #16 - The Substitute Teacher from the Black Lagoon (2005)
- Black Lagoon #17 - The Book Fair from the Black Lagoon (2006)
- Black Lagoon #18 - The School Secretary from the Black Lagoon (2006)
- Black Lagoon #19 - The Computer Teacher from the Black Lagoon (2007)
- Black Lagoon #20 - The Vice Principal from the Black Lagoon (2007)
- Black Lagoon 25th Anniversary Special - The School from the Black Lagoon (2014)
- Black Lagoon #21 - The School Counselor from the Black Lagoon (2026), written by Matt Gorman

In 2002, Scholastic released the first Black Lagoon Chapter book, The Class Trip from the Black Lagoon.

Between 2002 and 2026, The Black Lagoon chapter book series grew to include 37 books, including;

- Black Lagoon Adventures #01 - The Class Trip from the Black Lagoon (2002)
- Black Lagoon Adventures #02 - The Talent Show from the Black Lagoon (2003)
- Black Lagoon Adventures #03 - The Class Election from the Black Lagoon (2003)
- Black Lagoon Adventures #04 - The Science Fair from the Black Lagoon (2004)
- Black Lagoon Adventures #05 - The Halloween Party from the Black Lagoon (2004)
- Black Lagoon Adventures #06 - The Field Day from the Black Lagoon (2005)
- Black Lagoon Adventures #07 - The School Carnival from the Black Lagoon (2005)
- Black Lagoon Adventures #08 - Valentine's Day from the Black Lagoon (2006)
- Black Lagoon Adventures #09 - The Christmas Party from the Black Lagoon (2006)
- Black Lagoon Adventures #10 - The Little League Team from the Black Lagoon (2007)
- Black Lagoon Adventures #11 - The Snow Day from the Black Lagoon (2008)
- Black Lagoon Adventures #12 - April Fools' Day from the Black Lagoon (2008)
- Black Lagoon Adventures #13 - Back-to-School Fright from the Black Lagoon (2008)
- Black Lagoon Adventures #14 - The New Year's Eve Sleepover from the Black Lagoon (2008)
- Black Lagoon Adventures #15 - The Spring Dance from the Black Lagoon (2009)
- Black Lagoon Adventures #16 - The Thanksgiving Day from the Black Lagoon (2009)
- Black Lagoon Adventures #17 - The Summer Vacation from the Black Lagoon (2010)
- Black Lagoon Adventures #18 - The Author Visit from the Black Lagoon (2010)
- Black Lagoon Adventures #19 - St. Patrick's Day from the Black Lagoon (2011)
- Black Lagoon Adventures #20 - The School Play from the Black Lagoon (2011)
- Black Lagoon Adventures #21 - The 100th Day of School from the Black Lagoon (2012)
- Black Lagoon Adventures #22 - The Class Picture Day from the Black Lagoon (2012)
- Black Lagoon Adventures #23 - Earth Day from the Black Lagoon (2012)
- Black Lagoon Adventures #24 - The Summer Camp from the Black Lagoon (2013)
- Black Lagoon Adventures #25 - Friday the 13th from the Black Lagoon (2013)
- Black Lagoon Adventures #26 - The Big Game from the Black Lagoon (2013)
- Black Lagoon Adventures #27 - The Amusement Park from the Black Lagoon (2014)
- Black Lagoon Adventures #28 - The Secret Santa from the Black Lagoon (2015)
- Black Lagoon Adventures #29 - Groundhog Day from the Black Lagoon (2015)
- Black Lagoon Adventures #30 - The Reading Challenge from the Black Lagoon (2015)
- Black Lagoon Adventures #31 - Trick or Treat from the Black Lagoon (2015)
- Black Lagoon Adventures #32 - The Pool Party from the Black Lagoon (2016)
- Black Lagoon Adventures #33 - The New Puppy from the Black Lagoon (2017)
- Black Lagoon Adventures #34 - The Spring Break from the Black Lagoon (2018)
- Black Lagoon Adventures #35 - The Slime from the Black Lagoon (2019)
- Black Lagoon Adventures #36 - The Magic Show from the Black Lagoon (2021)
- Black Lagoon Adventures #37 - The Birthday Party from the Black Lagoon (2026), written by Matt Gorman

Between 2015 and 2017, a Black Lagoon special edition series called Hubie Cool released three new books:

- Hubie Cool #1: Super Spy (2015)
- Hubie Cool #2: Vampire Hunter (2016)
- Hubie Cool #3: Super Hero (2017)

=== Other book series ===
The Bully Brothers: 1993–96 Thaler wrote a 4-book series called The Bully Brothers. In 1995, it received the IRA Children's Choice Award 1995. All 4 were illustrated by Jared Lee.

Happily Ever After: In 1997 Thaler wrote a series called Happily Ever After. The four fractured fairy tales, Hanzel and Pretzel, The Princess and Pea-ano, Schmoe White and the Seven Dorfs and Cinderella Bigfoot, illustrated by Jared Lee, won the 1998 International Reading Association (IRA) Children's Choice award, and #1 pick by USA Today. Cincinnati Enquirer commentator, Sara Pearce, dubbed Thaler and Jared Lee "The court jesters of children's literature".

Heaven and Mirth: Thaler worked with illustrator Dennis Adler on a nine-book series called Heaven and Mirth published by Cook Communications Ministries. (2000–2001)

Tales From the Back Pew: Zondervan Publishing releases an 8-book series called Tales from the Back Pew written by Thaler and illustrated by Jared Lee, which also included a riddle book and a joke book. (2009–2010)

- Tales from the Back Pew #1 - Preacher Creature Strikes on Sunday (2009)
- Tales from the Back Pew #2 - Mission Trip Impossible (2009)
- Tales from the Back Pew #3 - Easter Egg Haunt (2009)
- Tales from the Back Pew #4 - Church Summer Cramp (2009)
- Tales from the Back Pew #5 - Walking the Plank To The Baptism Tank (2009)
- Tales from the Back Pew #6 - Vacation Bible Snooze (2010)
- Tales from the Back Pew #7 - Church Harvest Mess-tival (2010)
- Tales from the Back Pew #8 - The Three Wise Guys (2010)
- In the Big Inning... Bible Riddles from the Back Pew (2010)
- Bible Knock-Knock Jokes from the Back Pew (2010)

=== Animated books ===
Produced by Weston Woods. Awarded Notable Children's Videos by American Library Association (ALA)

- 2004: The Teacher from the Black Lagoon
- 2008: The Librarian from the Black Lagoon
- 2009: The Gym Teacher from the Black Lagoon

=== Foreign language editions ===
- 1980 Japanese Bochibochi ikoka [What Can a Hippopotamus be?] ISBN 978-4-03-201610-9
- 1985 French: A Hippopotamus Ate the Teacher ISBN 9780380812738
- 1992 Japanese: Owly ISBN 4-566-00300-0
- 1996 Spanish: Las Tres Cabras Grunonas (3 Grunting Goats)ISBN 0-590-92798-1
- 2001 Spanish: Teacher from Black Lagoon: La Maestra del Pantano Negro ISBN 0-439-26362-X
- 2003 Korean: Teacher from Black Lagoon ISBN 978-89-6170-018-4
- 2015 Chinese: Owly ISBN 978-7-307-14988-5
- 2016 Chinese: How Far Can a Rubber Band Stretch? ISBN 978-986-6215-50-6
- 2017 Chinese: Set of Black Lagoon Chapter books #1 -23

=== Recordings ===
The Riddle King Tells His Favorite Riddles, Jokes, Stories, and Songs with Steve Charney, Caedmon (New York, NY), 1985.

The Riddle King's Riddle Song: Scholastic Songs with Steve Charney, Scholastic (New York, NY), 1987.

Other cassette recordings include These Are the Questions, My Blanket Is the Sky, and Sing Me a Rainbow.

=== ISBN list of all books ===
- 1961 Magic Boy, written & illustrated by Mike Thaler LCCN 61--15135
- 1962 Clown's Smile written & illustrated by Mike Thaler LCCN 62--7578
- 1963 Kings Flower written & illustrated by Mike Thaler LCCN 65--15063
- 1963 Penny Pencil written & illustrated by Mike Thaler LCCN 62--14317*
- 1964 Moonboy written & illustrated by Mike Thaler LCCN 64--12809*
- 1966 The Classic Cartoons Anthology by Mike Thaler & William Cole LCCN 66--21125
- 1966 Prince and the Seven Moons by Mike Thaler, illustrated by Ursula Arndt LCCN 66--11582
- 1967 Rainbow by Mike Thaler, illustrated by Donald Leake LCCN 67--16286
- 1971 My Little Friend by Mike Thaler, illustrated by Arnie Levin LCCN 76--14848
- 1971 Smiling Book by Mike Thaler, illustrated by Arnie Levin LCCN 79--11633
- 1971 The Staff by Mike Thaler, illustrated by Joseph Schindelman ISBN 0-394-82058-4
- 1974 How Far Can a Rubber Band Stretch? by Mike Thaler, illustrated by Jerry Joyner ISBN 0-8193-0766-1
- 1974 Magic Letter Riddles written & illustrated by Mike Thaler ISBN 0-590-09925-6
- 1975 Riddle Riot written & illustrated by Mike Thaler
- 1975 What Can a Hippopotamus Be? by Mike Thaler, illustrated by Robert Grossman ISBN 0-8193-0810-2
- 1975 Wuzzles written & illustrated by Mike Thaler ISBN 0-590-10164-1
- 1976 Funny Bones written & illustrated by Mike Thaler ISBN 0-440-92616-5
- 1976 Soup with Quackers written & illustrated by Mike Thaler ISBN 0-531-00344-2
- 1976 The Square Bear written by William Cole, illustrated by Mike Thaler
- 1976 Very Silly Puzzles written & illustrated by Mike Thaler
- 1977 Dazzles written & illustrated by Mike Thaler ISBN 0-448-12223-5
- 1977 Knock Knocks You've Never Heard Before written by William Cole illustrated by Mike Thaler ISBN 0-440-94593-3
- 1977 Never Tickle a Turtle written & illustrated by Mike Thaler ISBN 0-380-43364-8
- 1977 There's a Hippopotamus Under My Bed by Mike Thaler, illustrated by Ray Cruz ISBN 0-380-40238-6 Dodd, Mead
- 1978 Chocolate Marshmellowphant Sundae written & illustrated by Mike Thaler ISBN 0-531-02244-7
- 1978 Do you Give up? written by William Cole, illustrated by Mike Thaler ISBN 0-85166-769-4
- 1978 Knock Knocks, Most Ever written by William Cole, illustrated by Mike Thaler ISBN 0-531-02428-8
- 1978 Madge's Magic Show by Mike Thaler, illustrated by Carol Nicklaus ISBN 0-531-01450-9
- 1978 What's up Duck written & illustrated by Mike Thaler ISBN 0-380-53363-4
- 1979 Backwords written by William Cole, illustrated by Mike Thaler ISBN 0-394-62040-2
- 1979 Grin and Bear It written & illustrated by Mike Thaler ISBN 0-448-17042-6
- 1979 Nose Knows written & illustrated by Mike Thaler ISBN 0-448-17041-8
- 1979 Picture Riddles written & illustrated by Mike Thaler ISBN 0-394-62124-7
- 1979 Screamers written & illustrated by Mike Thaler ISBN 0-448-17038-8
- 1979 Steer Wars written & illustrated by Mike Thaler ISBN 0-448-17040-X
- 1979 Toucans on Two Cans written & illustrated by Mike Thaler ISBN 0-448-17039-6
- 1979 Unicorns on the Cob written & illustrated by Mike Thaler ISBN 0-448-17043-4
- 1980 Complete Cootie Book written & illustrated by Mike Thaler ISBN 0-380-76133-5
- 1980 Moose is Loose by Mike Thaler, illustrated Toni Goffe ISBN 0-590-31291-X
- 1980 My Puppy written by Mike Thaler, Illustrated Madeleine Fishman ISBN 0-06-026078-5 ISBN 0-06-026079-3
- 1980 What Can a Hippopotamus Be? Japanese edition by Mike Thaler, illustrated by Robert Grossman
- 1980 Yellow Brick Toad written & illustrated by Mike Thaler ISBN 0-671-56035-2
- 1981 A Hippo Ate the Teacher written by Mike Thaler, Illustrated by Jared Lee ISBN 0-380-78048-8 Dodd, Mead
- 1981 Moonkey by Mike Thaler, illustrated by Giulio Maestro ISBN 0-06-026124-2
- 1981 Oinkers Away written by William Cole, illustrated by Mike Thaler ISBN 0-671-43064-5
- 1982 Catzilla written & illustrated by Mike Thaler ISBN 0-671-73297-8
- 1982 Monster Knock Knocks Co-written by William Cole & Mike Thaler, illustrated by Mike Thaler ISBN 0-671-50810-5
- 1982 Moon and the Balloon by Mike Thaler, illustrated Madeleine Fishman 8038–4744–0
- 1982 Owly by Mike Thaler, illustrated by David Wiesner ISBN 0-06-026151-X
- 1982 Pacman Riddle and Joke Book written & illustrated by Mike Thaler ISBN 0-671-46185-0
- 1982 Paws written & illustrated by Mike Thaler ISBN 0-671-45287-8
- 1982 Scared Silly written & illustrated by Mike Thaler ISBN 0-380-80291-0
- 1982 Story Puzzles written & illustrated by Mike Thaler ISBN 0-590-32295-8
- 1983 Its Me, Hippo! by Mike Thaler, illustrated by Maxie Chambliss ISBN 0-437-90146-7
- 1983 Stuffed Feet written & illustrated by Mike Thaler ISBN 0-380-84673-X
- 1984 Come and Play Hippo by Mike Thaler, illustrated by Maxie Chambliss ISBN 0-06-026176-5
- 1985 Cream of Creature From the School Cafeteria by Mike Thaler, illustrated Jared Lee ISBN 0-380-89862-4 Dodd, Mead
- 1985 Funny Side Up written & illustrated by Mike Thaler ISBN 0-590-33288-0
- 1985 Montgomery Moose's Favorite Riddles by Mike Thaler, illustrated by Neal Mcpheeters ISBN 0-590-33430-1
- 1985 Record: Riddle King tells his favorite Riddles written & illustrated by Mike Thaler LCCN 84--74001
- 1986 Clowns Smile re-illustrated by Mike Thaler,& illustrated Tracey Cameron ISBN 0-06-026051-3
- 1986 Hippo Lemonade by Mike Thaler illustrated by Maxie Chambliss ISBN 0-06-026159-5
- 1986 King Kong's Underwear written & illustrated by Mike Thaler ISBN 0-380-89823-3
- 1986 Upside Down Day by Mike Thaler, illustrated by Jared Lee ISBN 0-380-89999-X
- 1987 Hink Pink Monsters by Mike Thaler, illustrated by Fred Winkowski ISBN 0-590-40697-3
- 1987 Mr. Banana Head at Home written & illustrated by Mike Thaler ISBN 0-590-33778-5
- 1987 Riddle King's Giant book of Jokes, Riddles & Activities written & illustrated by Mike Thaler ISBN 0-87449-326-9
- 1987 Riddle King's Jumbo book of Jokes Riddles & Activities written & illustrated by Mike Thaler ISBN 0-87449-328-5
- 1987 Riddle King's Super book of Jokes Riddles & Activities written & illustrated by Mike Thaler ISBN 0-87449-327-7
- 1987 Software: Minescape Riddle Magic by Mike Thaler, software designer Janet Pullen apple
- 1988 In the Middle of the Puddle by Mike Thaler, illustrated by Bruce Degen ISBN 0-06-443288-2
- 1988 Pack 109 by Mike Thaler, illustrated by Normand Chartier ISBN 0-525-44393-2
- 1989 Teacher from the Black Lagoon by Mike Thaler, illustrated by Jared Lee ISBN 978-0-545-06522-1 Dodd, Mead
- 1989 Frankensteins Panty Hose written and illustrated by Mike Thaler ISBN 0-380-75613-7
- 1989 Riddle King's Camp Riddles by Mike Thaler, illustrated by Paul Harvey ISBN 0-394-83995-1
- 1989 Riddle King's Food Riddles by Mike Thaler, illustrated by Paul Harvey ISBN 0-394-84041-0
- 1989 Riddle King's Pet Riddles by Mike Thaler, illustrated by Paul Harvey ISBN 0-394-83977-3
- 1989 Riddle King's School Riddles by Mike Thaler, illustrated by Paul Harvey ISBN 0-394-84004-6
- 1989 You Don't Scare Me by Mike Thaler, illustrated by Maxie Chambliss ISBN 0-663-51048-1
- 1990 Mole's New Cap by Mike Thaler, illustrated by Maxie Chambliss ISBN 0-15-337609-0
- 1990 Phonics Riddles: Fantastic Level A Book 1 by Mike Thaler, illustrated by Jerry Smath ISBN 0-8136-0855-4
- 1990 Phonics Riddles: Fabulous – Teacher's guide level B by Mike Thaler, illustrated by John K. Crum ISBN 0-8136-0866-X
- 1990 Phonics Riddles: Fabulous Level B Book 1 by Mike Thaler, illustrated by Bill Ogden ISBN 0-8136-0862-7
- 1990 Phonics Riddles: Fabulous Level B Book 2 by Mike Thaler, illustrated by Bill Ogden ISBN 0-8136-0863-5
- 1990 Phonics Riddles: Fabulous Level B Book 3 by Mike Thaler, illustrated by Bill Ogden ISBN 0-8136-0864-3
- 1990 Phonics Riddles: Fabulous Level B Book 4 by Mike Thaler, illustrated by Bill Ogden ISBN 0-8136-0865-1
- 1990 Phonics Riddles: Fantastic Level A Book 3 by Mike Thaler, illustrated by Jerry Smath ISBN 0-8136-0857-0
- 1990 Phonics Riddles: Fantastic Level A Book 4 by Mike Thaler, illustrated by Jerry Smath ISBN 0-8136-0858-9
- 1990 Phonics Riddles: Fantastic Level A Book 2 by Mike Thaler, illustrated by Jerry Smath ISBN 0-8136-0856-2
- 1990 Phonics Riddles: Fantastic- Teachers guide level A by Mike Thaler, illustrated by John K Crum ISBN 0-8136-0859-7
- 1990 Phonics Riddles: Phenomenal Level C Book 1 by Mike Thaler, illustrated by John Dearstyne ISBN 0-8136-0869-4
- 1990 Phonics Riddles: Phenomenal Level C book 2 by Mike Thaler, illustrated by John Dearstyne ISBN 0-8136-0870-8
- 1990 Phonics Riddles: Phenomenal Level C Book 3 by Mike Thaler, illustrated by John Dearstyne ISBN 0-8136-0871-6
- 1990 Phonics Riddles: Phenomenal Level C Book 4 by Mike Thaler, illustrated by John Dearstyne ISBN 0-8136-0872-4
- 1991 Seven Little Hippos by Mike Thaler, illustrated by Jerry Smath ISBN 0-671-89907-4
- 1992 Owly Japanese edition by Mike Thaler, illustrated by David Wieser 4-566-00300-0
- 1993 Principal from the Black Lagoon by Mike Thaler, illustrated by Jared Lee ISBN 978-0-545-06932-8
- 1993 Bully Brothers Trick the Tooth Fairy by Mike Thaler, illustrated by Jared Lee ISBN 0-448-40519-9
- 1993 Bully Brothers: Goblin Halloween by Mike Thaler, illustrated by Jared Lee ISBN 0-448-40158-4
- 1993 Cannon the Librarian by Mike Thaler, illustrated by Jared Lee ISBN 0-380-76964-6
- 1993 Cassette: Little Riddle Rhymers Mike Thaler, sung by Steve Chairney 914-679-7453
- 1994 Gym Teacher from the Black Lagoon by Mike Thaler, illustrated by Jared Lee ISBN 978-0-545-06931-1
- 1994 Camp Rotten Time by Mike Thaler, illustrated by Jared Lee ISBN 0-8167-6870-6
- 1994 Colossal Fossil by Mike Thaler, illustrated by Rick Brown ISBN 0-7167-6561-6
- 1994 Earth Mirth by Mike Thaler, illustrated by Rick Brown ISBN 0-7167-6521-7
- 1994 Fang the Dentist by Mike Thaler, illustrated by Jared Lee ISBN 0-8167-3021-0
- 1994 Miss Yonkers Goes Bonkers by Mike Thaler, illustrated by Jared Lee ISBN 0-380-77510-7
- 1994 My Cat is Going to the Dogs by Mike Thaler, illustrated by Jared Lee ISBN 0-8167-5208-7
- 1994 Never Mail an Elephant by Mike Thaler, illustrated by Jerry Smath ISBN 0-8167-3019-9
- 1994 Uses For Mooses by Mike Thaler, illustrated by Jerry Smath ISBN 0-8167-3302-3
- 1995 Bad Day at Monster Elementary by Mike Thaler, illustrated by Jared Lee ISBN 0-380-77870-X
- 1995 School Nurse from the Black Lagoon by Mike Thaler, illustrated by Jared Lee ISBN 978-0-545-08542-7
- 1995 Bully Brothers: Making the Grade by Mike Thaler, illustrated by Jared Lee ISBN 0-590-47801-X
- 1995 Cassette: The Backwards Song by Mike Thaler, sung by Steve Charney
- 1995 The Schmo Must Go On by Mike Thaler, illustrated Jared Lee ISBN 0-8167-3519-0
- 1996 Bully Brothers: At the Beach by Mike Thaler, illustrated by Jared Lee ISBN 0-590-47802-8
- 1996 I'm Dracula Who Are You? by Mike Thaler, illustrated by Jared Lee ISBN 0-8167-4116-6
- 1996 Imagine that! – play of 3 Billy Goats Gruff retold by Mike Thaler, illustrated by Vincent Andriani ISBN 0-590-49107-5
- 1996 Las Tres Cabras Grunonas retold by Mike Thaler, illustrated by Vincent Andriani ISBN 0-590-92798-1
- 1996 Love Stinks by Mike Thaler, illustrated by Jared Lee ISBN 0-8167-3906-4
- 1996 Moving to Mars by Mike Thaler, illustrated by Jared Lee ISBN 0-8167-3970-6
- 1996 Never Give a Fish an Umbrella by Mike Thaler, illustrated by Jerry Smath ISBN 0-8167-3904-8
- 1997 Make your Beds, Bananaheads by Mike Thaler, illustrated by Jared Lee ISBN 0-8167-4356-8
- 1997 Librarian from the Black Lagoon by Mike Thaler, illustrated by Jared Lee ISBN 978-0-545-06523-8
- 1998 Cafeteria Lady from the Black Lagoon by Mike Thaler, illustrated by Jared Lee ISBN 0-590-50493-2
- 1999 School Bus Driver from the Black Lagoon by Mike Thaler, illustrated by Jared Lee ISBN 0-439-06750-2
- 2000 Music Teacher from the Black Lagoon by Mike Thaler, illustrated by Jared Lee ISBN 0-439-18873-3
- 2000 Cinderquaker by Mike Thaler, illustrated by Dave Clegg ISBN 0-439-14068-4
- 2000 Heaven & Mirth: Adam and the Apple Turnover by Mike Thaler, illustrated by Dennis Adler ISBN 0-7814-3261-8
- 2000 Heaven & Mirth: Daniel Nice Kitty by Mike Thaler, illustrated by Dennis Adler ISBN 0-7814-3432-7
- 2000 Heaven & Mirth: David and Bubblebath-Sheba by Mike Thaler, illustrated by Dennis Adler ISBN 0-78143-511-0
- 2000 Heaven & Mirth: David God's Rocks Star by Mike Thaler, illustrated by Dennis Adler ISBN 0-78143-429-7
- 2000 Heaven & Mirth: Elijah by Mike Thaler, illustrated by Dennis Adler ISBN 0-78143-512-9
- 2000 Heaven & Mirth: Moses by Mike Thaler, illustrated by Dennis Adler ISBN 0-7814-3262-6
- 2000 Heaven & Mirth: Paul by Mike Thaler, illustrated by Dennis Adler ISBN 0-7814-3433-5
- 2000 Heaven & Mirth: Prodigal Son by Mike Thaler, illustrated by Dennis Adler ISBN 0-7814-3263-4
- 2001 Custodian from the Black Lagoon by Mike Thaler, illustrated by Jared Lee ISBN 0-439-18874-1
- 2001 La Maestra del Pantano Negro by Mike Thaler, illustrated by Jared Lee ISBN 0-439-26362-X
- 2001 Heaven & Mirth: John the Baptist by Mike Thaler, illustrated by Dennis Adler ISBN 0-78143-513-7
- 2001 Little Dinosaur by Mike Thaler, illustrated by Paige Miglio ISBN 0-8050-6213-0
- 2002 Class from the Black Lagoon by Mike Thaler, illustrated by Jared Lee ISBN 0-439-42926-9
- 2002 Class Trip from the Black Lagoon by Mike Thaler, illustrated by Jared Lee ISBN 0-439-42927-7
- 2002 Action Heroes of the Bible: The Sermonators by Mike Thaler, illustrated by Dennis Adler ISBN 0-7814-3649-4
- 2002 Heroines of the Bible; God's Fair Ladies by Mike Thaler, illustrated by Dennis Adler ISBN 0-7814-3651-6
- 2002 Prophets of the Bible; God's Anchormen by Mike Thaler, illustrated by Dennis Adler ISBN 0-7814-3650-8
- 2002 Imagination Biography written Mike Thaler, photo's by Sherry Shahan 1-57274-598-3
- 2003 Class Pet from the Black Lagoon by Mike Thaler, illustrated by Jared Lee ISBN 978-0-545-06930-4
- 2003 Art Teacher from the Black Lagoon by Mike Thaler, illustrated by Jared Lee ISBN 0-439-42925-0
- 2003 Class Election from the Black Lagoon by Mike Thaler, illustrated by Jared Lee ISBN 0-439-55716-X
- 2003 Talent Show from the Black Lagoon by Mike Thaler, illustrated by Jared Lee ISBN 0-439-43894-2
- 2004 Bully from the Black Lagoon by Mike Thaler, illustrated by Jared Lee ISBN 0-439-68072-7
- 2004 New Kid from the Black Lagoon by Mike Thaler, illustrated by Jared Lee ISBN 0-439-55719-4
- 2004 Halloween Party from the Black Lagoon by Mike Thaler, illustrated by Jared Lee ISBN 0-439-68075-1
- 2004 Science Fair from the Black Lagoon by Mike Thaler, illustrated by Jared Lee ISBN 0-439-55717-8
- 2005 Black Lagoon Favorites by Mike Thaler, illustrated by Jared Lee ISBN 0-7607-9539-8
- 2005 Dentist from the Black Lagoon by Mike Thaler, illustrated by Jared Lee ISBN 978-0-545-07783-5
- 2005 Substitute Teacher from the Black Lagoon by Mike Thaler, illustrated by Jared Lee ISBN 0-439-80074-9
- 2005 Dentist from the Black Lagoon by Mike Thaler, illustrated by Jared Lee ISBN 0-545-07783-4
- 2005 Field Day from the Black Lagoon by Mike Thaler, illustrated by Jared Lee ISBN 0-439-68076-X
- 2005 School Carnival from the Black Lagoon by Mike Thaler, illustrated by Jared Lee 1-439-80075-7
- 2006 Pig Little by Mike Thaler, illustrated by Paige Miglio ISBN 0-8050-6977-1
- 2006 Black Lagoon Adventures Special Edition Books 1-7 by Mike Thaler, illustrated by Jared Lee ISBN 0-439-85201-3
- 2006 Book Fair from the Black Lagoon by Mike Thaler, illustrated by Jared Lee ISBN 0-439-88348-2
- 2006 School Secretary from the Black Lagoon by Mike Thaler, illustrated by Jared Lee ISBN 0-439-80077-3
- 2006 Book Fair from the Black Lagoon by Mike Thaler, illustrated by Jared Lee ISBN 0-439-88348-2
- 2006 Christmas Party from the Black Lagoon by Mike Thaler, illustrated by Jared Lee ISBN 0-439-87160-3
- 2006 Valentines Day from the Black Lagoon by Mike Thaler, illustrated by Jared Lee ISBN 0-439-80076-5
- 2007 Computer Teacher from the Black Lagoon by Mike Thaler, illustrated by Jared Lee ISBN 978-0-439-87133-4
- 2007 School Riddles from the Black Lagoon by Mike Thaler, illustrated by Jared Lee ISBN 978-0-545-01758-9
- 2007 Vice Principal from the Black Lagoon by Mike Thaler, illustrated by Jared Lee ISBN 978-0-439-87132-7
- 2007 Little League Team from the Black Lagoon by Mike Thaler, illustrated by Jared Lee ISBN 0-439-87162-X
- 2008 Teacher from Black Lagoon by Mike Thaler, illustrated by Jared Lee Korean Translation Bomulchange Publishing
- 2008 April Fool's Day from the Black Lagoon by Mike Thaler, illustrated by Jared Lee ISBN 0-545-01767-X
- 2008 Back to School Fright from the Black Lagoon by Mike Thaler, illustrated by Jared Lee ISBN 0-545-07221-2
- 2008 Snow Day from the Black Lagoon by Mike Thaler, illustrated by Jared Lee ISBN 0-545-01766-1
- 2008 The New Year's Eve Sleepover from the Black Lagoon by Mike Thaler, illustrated by Jared Lee ISBN 0-545-07222-0
- 2009 Tales From the Back Pew: Walking the Plank To The Baptism Tank by Mike Thaler, illustrated by Jared Lee ISBN 978-0-310-71594-8
- 2009 Tales from the Back Pew: Church Summer Cramp by Mike Thaler, illustrated by Jared Lee ISBN 978-0-310-71592-4
- 2009 Tales from the Back Pew: Creature Preacher by Mike Thaler, illustrated by Jared Lee ISBN 978-0-310-71589-4
- 2009 Tales from the Back Pew: Easter Egg Haunt by Mike Thaler, illustrated by Jared Lee ISBN 978-0-310-71591-7
- 2009 Tales from the Back Pew: Mission Trip Impossible by Mike Thaler, illustrated by Jared Lee ISBN 978-0-310-71590-0
- 2009 Spring Dance from the Black Lagoon by Mike Thaler, illustrated by Jared Lee ISBN 0-545-07223-9
- 2009 Thanksgiving Day from the Black Lagoon by Mike Thaler, illustrated by Jared Lee ISBN 0-545-16812-0
- 2010 Tales from the Back Pew: Church Harvest Mess-tival by Mike Thaler, illustrated by Jared Lee ISBN 978-0-310-71595-5
- 2010 Tales from the Back Pew: In the Big Inning Bible Riddles by Mike Thaler, illustrated by Jared Lee ISBN 978-0-310-71597-9
- 2010 Tales from the Back Pew: The Three Wise Guys by Mike Thaler, illustrated by Jared Lee ISBN 978-0-310-71593-1
- 2010 Tales from the Back Pew: Vacation Bible Snooze by Mike Thaler, illustrated by Jared Lee ISBN 978-0-310-71596-2
- 2010 Author Visit from the Black Lagoon by Mike Thaler, illustrated by Jared Lee ISBN 978-0-545-27327-5
- 2010 Book Report from the Black Lagoon by Mike Thaler, illustrated by Jared Lee ISBN 978-0-545-29046-3
- 2010 Slimy Science Kit by Mike Thaler, illustrated by Jared Lee ISBN 978-0-545-27160-8
- 2010 Summer Vacation from the Black Lagoon by Mike Thaler, illustrated by Jared Lee ISBN 978-0-545-07224-3
- 2011 A Hippo Ate the Teacher- updated edition by Mike Thaler, illustrated by Jared Lee ISBN 978-0-545-35707-4
- 2011 School Play from the Black Lagoon by Mike Thaler, illustrated by Jared Lee ISBN 978-0-545-37324-1
- 2011 St. Patrick's Day from the Black Lagoon by Mike Thaler, illustrated by Jared Lee ISBN 978-0-545-27328-2
- 2012 100th Day of School from the Black Lagoon by Mike Thaler, illustrated by Jared Lee ISBN 978-0-545-37325-8
- 2012 Class Picture Day from the Black Lagoon by Mike Thaler, illustrated by Jared Lee ISBN 978-0-545-47666-9
- 2012 Earth Day from the Black Lagoon by Mike Thaler, illustrated by Jared Lee ISBN 978-0-545-47669-0
- 2012 Meatloaf Monster from the School Cafeteria by Mike Thaler, illustrated by Jared Lee ISBN 978-0-545-48570-8
- 2013 Big Game from the Black Lagoon by Mike Thaler, illustrated by Jared Lee ISBN 978-0-545-61639-3
- 2013 Friday the 13th from the Black Lagoon by Mike Thaler, illustrated by Jared Lee ISBN 978-0-545-61638-6
- 2013 Summer Camp from the Black Lagoon by Mike Thaler, illustrated by Jared Lee ISBN 978-0-545-55399-5
- 2014 Sticker Book from the Black Lagoon by Mike Thaler, illustrated by Jared Lee ISBN 978-0-545-77373-7
- 2014 Amusement Park from the Black Lagoon by Mike Thaler, illustrated by Jared Lee ISBN 978-0-545-61641-6
- 2014 School from the Black Lagoon by Mike Thaler, illustrated by Jared Lee ISBN 978-0-545-80587-2
- 2015 Black Lagoon Special: Hubie Cool: Super Spy by Mike Thaler, illustrated by Jared Lee ISBN 978-0-545-85076-6
- 2015 Groundhog Day from the Black Lagoon by Mike Thaler, illustrated by Jared Lee ISBN 978-0-545-78520-4
- 2015 Reading Challenge from the Black Lagoon by Mike Thaler, illustrated by Jared Lee ISBN 978-0-545-78521-1
- 2015 Secret Santa from the Black Lagoon by Mike Thaler, illustrated by Jared Lee ISBN 978-0-545-78519-8
- 2015 Trick or Treat from the Black Lagoon by Mike Thaler, illustrated by Jared Lee ISBN 978-0-545-85072-8
- 2015 Owly by Mike Thaler, illustrated by Qu Wei Chinese edition ISBN 978-7-307-14988-5
- 2016 Black Lagoon Special: Hubie Cool: Vampire Hunter by Mike Thaler, illustrated by Jared Lee ISBN 978-0-545-85075-9
- 2016 Pool Party from the Black Lagoon by Mike Thaler, illustrated by Jared Lee ISBN 978-0-545-85073-5
- 2017 Black Lagoon Special: Hubie Cool: Super Hero by Mike Thaler, illustrated by ISBN 978-1-338-17220-1
- 2017 My Puppy from the Black Lagoon by Mike Thaler, illustrated by Jared Lee ISBN 978-1-338-24461-8

== Cited references ==
- Harpers Bazaar Magazine Dec 1960 December, 1960 issue of Harper's Magazine (p. 90-91).
- Ursula Nordstrom
- Letterman Television show Library Journal volume 101 pg 1848
- Electric Co. & Joan Rivers
- (1978 vol 22, pg 63 Journal of reading/letterman creator Library Journal 94977-7: "Cartoon Monster Riddles Mike Thaler • Illustrations by the author ... That's when Victor notices that lizards are beginning to appear on various TV shows. ... in the form of awful puns — from the creator of "Letterman," the popular cartoon character seen on The Electric Company." The Adventures of Letterman
- Riddle King Arizona Republic Jan 31, 1983
- Jean Feiwel
- (10). ISBN listing of books published Books published ISBN registry
- Press Release: Lenora Kaplan/Lynn Cariou of M. Booth & Associates 225 W 34th St., New York, NY confirming Mike chosen to launch the Jell-o Reading Rocket program in Lansing. cc- letter received from Louise Botko, language arts consultant, Minneapolis public schools, 807 NE Broadway, Minneapolis, MN on April 21, 1989 to Gerry Bogatz, Jell-O Reading Rocket, 10 N Main St. Yardley, PA regarding March 23, 1989 visit to school by Mike Thaler. cc from Gloria Goldberg, Chapter 1 Reading Specialist 27th St School, Milwaukee, WI writes hand written 4 page letter complimenting Mike's visit to Jello Reading Coordinators.
- Jared Lee A Hippopotamus Ate the Teacher ISBN 0-380-78048-8 published by Scholastic 1981
- (16) Cincinnati Enquirer, March 18, 1997, Sara Pearce, review of titles in the "Happily Ever After" series, p. C5.
- BIOGRAPHICAL AND CRITICAL SOURCES: PERIODICALS Booklist, March 15, 1977, p. 1008; June 1, 1988, Beth Ames Herbert, review of In the Middle of the Puddle, pp. 1679–1680; September 15, 1990, p. 173; April 1, 1991, p. 1578. Bulletin of the Center for Children's Books, January, 1979, p. 90; July-August, 1982, Zena Sutherland, review of Owly, p. 216. Junior Bookshelf, February, 1978, p. 15. Kirkus Reviews, February 1, 1979, p. 131. Publishers Weekly, January 27, 1975, p. 285; December 2, 1983, review of It's Me, Hippo!, p. 86; March 8, 1993, p. 77; September 20, 1993, p. 30. School Library Journal, December, 1975, p. 49; April, 1977, p. 72; May, 1978, p. 82; March, 1979, p. 122; November, 1981, p. 83; September, 1982, p. 112; December, 1983, p. 80; December, 1988, p. 94; August, 1991, p. 156; November, 1991, p. 107. /62541793/enc_linkads
