= Ken Roberts (announcer) =

American announcer (1910–2009)

- Born: Saul Trochman; February 22, 1910; New York, New York, U.S.
- Died: June 19, 2009 (aged 99); New York, New York, U.S.
- Occupations: Radio announcer; television announcer
- Years active: 1928–1982
- Spouses: Norma Finkelstein (m. 1934; died 1984) Sydell Salzberg (m. 1998)

Ken Roberts (born Saul Trochman, February 22, 1910 – June 19, 2009) was an American radio and television announcer known for his work during the Golden Age of Radio and for his work announcing the daytime television soap operas The Secret Storm, Texas and Love of Life, each for a two-decade span.

== Early life and education ==
Roberts was born Saul Trochman on February 22, 1910, in Manhattan and grew up in The Bronx. His father, Nathaniel Trochman, an insurance salesman and English tutor from Latvia, and his mother, Fanny Naft, from present-day Ukraine, were both Jewish immigrants to the United States. Roberts graduated from DeWitt Clinton High School. He briefly attended law school and worked in Fiorello H. La Guardia's law office as an intern, but quit the unpaid position after the firm wouldn't cover his bus fare. He changed his name after entering the radio business so that it would not "sound so Jewish".

== Radio and television career ==
His first announcing job was at WMCA in New York lasting three weeks. Next at WLTH in Brooklyn. In an interview for the book The Great American Broadcast, Roberts told Leonard Maltin that he had started at the Brooklyn station in 1930, where his responsibilities included answering phones and sweeping the floors, in addition to on-air roles playing piano and reading poetry.

During the 1930s and 1940s, at the height of the radio era, Roberts' voice appeared widely in live programming to introduce programs, moderate game shows and do live reads for commercials. Despite his Errol Flynn-like good looks and the frequent broadcasts featuring his voice, as often as several times each day, few listeners knew who he was or would have recognized him in public.

Radio credits include The Shadow (including the 1937-38 season on the Mutual Broadcasting System with a 22-year-old Orson Welles starring in the role of Lamont Cranston), the comedy Easy Aces, along with soap operas Joyce Jordan, M.D. and This Is Nora Drake. He also announced or hosted a number of game shows, such as What's My Name? and the parody It Pays to Be Ignorant, in which he would pose questions to actors portraying contestants such as "Who came first: Henry I or Henry VIII?" that would be answered incorrectly. At various times, he performed on eponymous programs for Fred Allen, Milton Berle, Victor Borge and Sophie Tucker.

In 1941, he achieved his goal of hosting his own quiz show, with Quick As a Flash on the Mutual network. Among the elements of the program, Roberts would dramatize an historic event which contestants would have to correctly identify. Other prizes were awarded for identifying the common element in three songs played by the orchestra and for solving descriptions of staged crimes.

On television, he was the original announcer for Candid Camera and introduced popular soap operas Love of Life from 1951 to 1980, The Secret Storm from 1954 to 1974 and Texas from 1980 to 1982. On Jan Murray's comedy game show Dollar a Second, Robert's on-air duties included advertisements for sponsor Mogen David wines.

He parodied himself on the 1970s educational television program The Electric Company, in which his bits included announcing a supposed program called Love of Chair, a spoof of Love of Life, in which Roberts would describe the attachment of a boy and his chair (for example, "Can a boy from a small chair in a big room find happiness as a top dog in a pet shop?")ending each skit with the cliffhanger "And what about Naomi?" He had an off-screen role as an announcer in Woody Allen's 1987 film Radio Days, in which his son Tony Roberts appeared.

Radio historian Jim Cox described Roberts' voice as neither "Yankee, Southern, Western or anything else". It was a voice that didn't "irritate anybody" and that "you just naturally liked to hear", making him "one of the leading lights of radio". Steve Beverly of The Daily Game Show Fix described Roberts as having "what executives called a golden throat", with a familiar voice that was one of broadcasting's most-recognized anonymous voices. He also found time to narrate dozens of theatrical movie trailers and "intermission" segments for traditional and drive-in theaters during the 1940s and 1950s.

== Personal ==
Roberts married twice in his youth, his first marriage annulled after two weeks and the second ending in divorce after a few months. Roberts and his third wife, the former Norma Finkelstein, were married for 50 years until her death in 1984. He was married for a fourth time in 1998 to Sydell Salzberg.

In 1935, Roberts was one of the founders of the American Guild of Radio Announcers and Producers, one of the predecessors of the American Federation of Television and Radio Artists (AFTRA).

Roberts died in Manhattan's NewYork–Presbyterian Hospital at age of 99, on June 19, 2009, due to pneumonia following a stroke he had suffered five years before his death. His son described his father's voice as accentless with perfect tones, sounding to him "as though it came from God" and telling him "Don't be an actor", at least at first.
