= Bayn Johnson =

American actress (born 1958)

- Born: November 4, 1958 (age 67); New Orleans, Louisiana, U.S.
- Occupations: Actress, singer
- Years active: 1967–1978

Bayn Johnson (born November 4, 1958) is a former American actress, electric guitarist and singer. The high point of her career was the period from 1973 to 1975, during which she appeared as Kelly, a blonde member of the band the Short Circus, in the third and fourth seasons of the PBS children's television series The Electric Company.

== Early career ==
Johnson got her first career break in the late 1960s, appearing opposite Bernadette Peters as the title character in the off-Broadway musical Curley McDimple, a pseudo-satirical tribute to Shirley Temple movies. She recorded a Christmas novelty song entitled Christmas Teddy Bear. On December 18, 1967, and January 8, 1968, she appeared on The Merv Griffin Show. In 1969, she appeared as Happy Hollywood in the television show, What's It All About, World? and on December 30, she guest starred as Penny Rose in the twelfth episode of the second season of Lancer, 'Little Darling of the Sierras'. From 1969 to 1970, she made cameo appearances in the children's television series Sesame Street.

== The Short Circus ==
In 1973, 14-year-old Johnson became a member of the Short Circus on the PBS television show The Electric Company. As Kelly, she replaced the recently departed Denise Nickerson, ultimately appearing in 260 episodes of the show. Johnson left The Electric Company in 1975 and was replaced by Janina Matthews.

== Later career ==
After quitting The Electric Company, Johnson appeared on The Love Boat in 1977 and on Police Woman and Switch in 1978.
