= Curley McDimple =

Curley McDimple A Musical Valentine to the Thirties
- Music: Robert Dahdah
- Lyrics: Robert Dahdah
- Book: Robert Dahdah and Mary Boylan
- Productions: 1967 Off Broadway

Curley McDimple is a musical with music and lyrics by Robert Dahdah and book by Robert Dahdah and Mary Boylan. The play is a spoof of Depression-era Shirley Temple movies and was presented in a black and white design. This was one of two musicals in which Bernadette Peters appeared that spoofed some aspect of Hollywood—the other was Dames at Sea. "The Meanest Man in Town" is its best-known song.

== Production history ==
Curley McDimple opened at the off Broadway Bert Wheeler Theatre, New York City on November 22, 1967, and ran for 931 performances, closing on January 25, 1970. Robert Dahdah directed, musical numbers were staged by Lonnie Evans, and Bernadette Peters was featured as "Alice", a performer. Peters left the production in early 1968 for her next show, George M!. Butterfly McQueen, who was known for her performance in the film Gone with the Wind, joined the cast on May 9, 1968. In a new role written for her, she played a cook at the boarding house. The Colorforms company also made a dress-up doll set based on the title character after Shirley Temple Black refused to grant the company a license.

== Plot synopsis ==
In the 1930s, Curley (the Shirley Temple-like character) arrives at Sarah's Theatrical Boarding House, a shabby but homey theatrical boarding house in Manhattan, New York City, run by a nice Irish lady, Sarah. Curley is an optimistic eight-year-old and is looking for parents to adopt her; she settles on Alice and Jimmy. They are performers who are both boarders at the house—they fall in love with each other at first sight. The boarders aid Sarah, who is threatened with losing her house through foreclosure by the banker, Mr. Gillingwater, by putting on a benefit vaudeville show. A mean social worker, during the rehearsals for the benefit, steals Curley away, taking her to an orphanage in New Jersey. Curley is able to escape and she performs in the show, which is a hit and is picked up by Broadway. Curley finds out that Gillingwater is her grandfather and that he is a former sweetheart of Sarah's, and Jimmy and Alice get married.

== Characters and original cast ==
- Jimmy, a boarder and young song and dance man trying to become a star – Paul Cahill (replaced by Don Emmons)
- Bill, a "Bill Robinson" type tap dancer – George Hillman
- Sarah, Irish owner of the boarding house – Helen Blount
- Miss Hamilton, social worker, looking like the Wicked Witch – Norma Bigtree
- Alice, another boarder and performer – Bernadette Peters (replaced by Sandy Bigtree)
- Mr. Gillingwater, a wealthy banker – Gene Galvin
- Curley, eight–year-old child star – Bayn Johnson (replaced by Kathy Rich)

== Musical numbers ==
Act I

- Overture
- A Cup of Coffee – Jimmy
- I Try – Jimmy and Alice
- Curley McDimple – Curley, Jimmy, Alice, Sarah, Bill
- Love is the Loveliest Song – Alice
- Are There Any More Rosie O'Gradys? – Sarah, Jimmy, Alice, Curley, Bill
- Dancing in the Rain – Curley, Bill, Company
- At the Playland Jamboree – Curley, Company
- I've Got a Little Secret – Jimmy, Curley

Act II

- Stars and Lovers – Alice, Jimmy, Company
- The Meanest Man in Town – Alice, Jimmy, Company
- I Try (reprise) – Jimmy, Alice
- Something Nice Is Going to Happen – Curley
- Swing-a-Ding-a-Ling – Curley
- Hi de hi de hi, Hi de hi de ho – Sarah, Alice, Jimmy, Bill, Mr. Gillingwater, Miss Hamilton
- Swing-a-Ding-a-Ling (Reprise) – Curley, Company
- Something Nice Is Going To Happen (Reprise) – Miss Hamilton
- Love is the Loveliest Love Song (reprise) – Jimmy, Company
- Finale – Jimmy
