= Naomi Foner Gyllenhaal =

American screenwriter (born 1946)

- Born: Naomi Achs; March 4, 1946 (age 80); New York City, U.S.
- Education: Barnard College (BA); Columbia University (MA)
- Occupations: Screenwriter; director
- Spouses: Eric Foner (m. 1965; div. 1977) Stephen Gyllenhaal (m. 1977; div. 2009)
- Children: Maggie Gyllenhaal; Jake Gyllenhaal

Naomi Foner Gyllenhaal (née Achs; born March 4, 1946) is an American screenwriter and director. She received an Academy Award nomination for her Running on Empty (1988) screenplay. She is the mother of actors Maggie and Jake Gyllenhaal.

== Early life and education ==
Foner was born in Brooklyn, New York City, the daughter of doctors Ruth (née Silbowitz; 1920–1968) and Samuel Achs (1919–2014). Her parents were both of Jewish ancestry. Her aunt was Freda (Silbowitz) Hertz (1915–2013), a lawyer. She was raised in a family of "high-achieving New York Jews." Her Ashkenazi Jewish grandparents emigrated from Eastern Europe (Russia and Poland).

She attended Barnard College in New York City, graduating with a BA degree in English. She later earned an MA degree in developmental psychology from Columbia University.

== Career ==
She has written the screenplays for several feature films, including Running on Empty (for which she received an Academy Award nomination for Best Original Screenplay and won a Golden Globe Award for the same category), Losing Isaiah, and Bee Season. She was the Naomi referenced in the line "...what about Naomi?" at the end of each Love of Chair segment of The Electric Company, where she was an associate producer for two seasons.

In 2013, she made her directorial debut with Very Good Girls, starring Dakota Fanning and Elizabeth Olsen, which premiered at the 2013 Sundance Film Festival before attaining online and theatrical distribution in the U.S. with Tribeca Film. She collaborated on a script for an American-Chinese co-production titled Moon Flower of Flying Tigers, which was to be co-produced by Ann An and Paula Wagner and based upon the book by Gao Demin.

== Personal life ==
Naomi Foner's first husband was Eric Foner, a historian and Columbia University professor, whom she married in 1965 and divorced in 1977. Her second marriage was to film director Stephen Gyllenhaal, from 1977 until their divorce in 2009. They have collaborated professionally and have two children together, actors Maggie Gyllenhaal (b. 1977) and Jake Gyllenhaal (b. 1980).
