= The Electric Company =

American children's television series (1971–1977)

- The series title card
- Created by: Joan Ganz Cooney; Lloyd Morrisett; Paul Dooley
- Directed by: Robert Schwarz; Henry Behar; John Tracy
- Starring: Morgan Freeman; Judy Graubart; Skip Hinnant; Rita Moreno; Jim Boyd; Lee Chamberlin (1971–1973); Bill Cosby (1971–1973); Luis Ávalos (1972–1977); Hattie Winston (1973–1977); Danny Seagren (1974–1977) The Short Circus; June Angela; Irene Cara (1971–1972); Douglas Grant (1971–1973); Stephen Gustafson (1971–1975); Melanie Henderson (1971–1975); Denise Nickerson (1972–1973); Bayn Johnson (1973–1975); Gregg Burge (1973–1975); Janina Mathews (1975–1977); Réjane Magloire (1975–1977); Rodney Lewis (1975–1977); Todd Graff (1975–1977) The Adventures of Letterman; Gene Wilder (voice); Zero Mostel (voice); Joan Rivers (voice)
- Theme music composer: Joe Raposo
- Country of origin: United States
- Original language: English
- No. of seasons: 6
- No. of episodes: 780

Production
- Running time: 28 minutes
- Production company: Children's Television Workshop

Original release
- Network: PBS
- Release: October 25, 1971 – April 15, 1977

The Electric Company is an American educational children's television series produced by the Children's Television Workshop (CTW, now known as Sesame Workshop). It was created by Joan Ganz Cooney, Lloyd Morrisett, and Paul Dooley. The series aired on PBS for 780 episodes over the course of its six seasons from October 25, 1971, to April 15, 1977. The program continued in reruns until October 4, 1985. The Electric Company later reran on Noggin, a channel co-founded by the CTW, from 1999 to 2003. Noggin also produced a compilation special for the show.

The Workshop produced the show at Reeves Teletape Studios in Manhattan. The Electric Company employed sketch comedy and various other devices to provide an entertaining program to help elementary school children develop their grammar and reading skills. Since it was intended for children who had graduated from CTW's flagship program, Sesame Street, the humor was more mature than what was seen there.

The show was directed by Robert Schwarz (1971 and 1977), Henry Behar (1972–1975), and John Tracy (1975–1976). Writers included Dooley, Tom Whedon, Christopher Cerf (1971–1973), Jeremy Stevens (1972–1974), John Boni, and Amy Ephron (1972–1973).

In many areas, a preview special, Here Comes The Electric Company, was seen in syndication through sponsor Johnson Wax on many local commercial stations during the week before its 1971 debut.

== Performers ==
The original cast included Morgan Freeman, Rita Moreno, Bill Cosby, Judy Graubart, Lee Chamberlin and Skip Hinnant. Most of the cast had done stage, repertory, and improvisational work, with Cosby and Moreno already well-established performers on film and television. Ken Roberts (1971–1973), best known as a soap opera announcer (Love of Life; The Secret Storm), was the narrator of some segments during season one, most notably the parody of the genre that had given him prominence, Love of Chair.

Jim Boyd, who was strictly an off-camera voice actor and puppeteer during the first season, began appearing on-camera in the second season, mostly in the role of J. Arthur Crank. Luis Ávalos also joined the cast at that time.

Cosby was a regular in the first season, and occasionally appeared in new segments during the second season, but left afterward. Segments that Cosby had taped for the first two years were repeatedly used for the remainder of the series run. Similarly, Chamberlin was a regular for the first two seasons, and her segments were also repeatedly used throughout the show's run. As a result, they were billed as cast members throughout the whole series run.

Added to the cast at the beginning of season three (1973–1974) was Hattie Winston, actress and singer who later appeared on the sitcom Becker. Beginning in season four (1974–1975), Danny Seagren, a puppeteer who had worked on Sesame Street and also as a professional dancer, appeared in the role of Spider-Man; Marvel Comics published Spidey Super Stories that tied into Seagren's appearances as Spider-Man in character, who never spoke aloud or unmasked himself.

== Selected sketches ==
- "The Adventures of Letterman": Premiering during season two, "Letterman" featured the work of animators John and Faith Hubley, written by author Mike Thaler. The title character (a flying superhero in a varsity sweater and a football helmet) repeatedly foiled the Spell Binder, an evil magician who made mischief by changing words into new words. (In the "origin of Letterman" segment, "In The Beginning," the Spell Binder was given this motive: "He HATES words, and he hates people who USE them!") It featured the voices of Zero Mostel, Joan Rivers, who narrated the segments, and Gene Wilder. In his book The TV Arab, Jack Shaheen criticized the portrayal of the evil Spell Binder as a negative racial stereotype; he found this disappointing, as PBS shows such as Sesame Street gained a reputation for appropriate portrayals of ethnicities.
- "Five Seconds": Halfway through the show, viewers were challenged to read a word within a five- or ten-second time limit. In seasons three and four (1973 to 1975), in a send-up of Mission: Impossible, the word would self-destruct in a Scanimate animation sequence after the time expired. In seasons five and six (1975 to 1977), the viewers had to read the word before a cast member (or a group of children) did.
- "Giggles, Goggles": Two friends (usually Rita Moreno and Judy Graubart) conversed while riding a tandem bicycle or performing some other activity together. One would humorously misuse a word and the other would correct her, with the process being repeated several times until they returned to the original word.
- "Here's Cooking at You": A send-up of Julia Child's cooking shows, with Judy Graubart playing Julia Grown-Up.
- "Jennifer of the Jungle": A Borscht Belt-style parody of George of the Jungle (which itself was a send-up of Tarzan), with Judy Graubart as Jennifer and Jim Boyd as Paul the Gorilla.
- "The Last Word": Shown at the end of season one (1971 to 1972), a dimly lit incandescent bulb with a pull-chain switch was shown hanging; the voice of Ken Roberts would gravely state, "And now, the last word." A single word would appear, usually one that had been featured earlier in the episode. An unseen cast member would read the word aloud, reach his/her arm into the shot, and turn the light off by tugging the pull chain.
- "Love of Chair": A send-up of Love of Life in which Ken Roberts, who was also the announcer for Life, would read a Dick and Jane–style story about a boy (Skip Hinnant) sitting on a chair and doing simple things, concluding by asking questions in a dramatic tone (the announcer's final, portentous question was always ”And...what about Naomi?“) followed by "For the answer to these and other questions, tune in tomorrow for...'Love of Chair'." "Naomi" was an in-joke reference to Naomi Foner, a producer on the show during its first two seasons; Foner went on to become an Academy Award-nominated screenwriter (Running on Empty) and the mother of Maggie Gyllenhaal and Jake Gyllenhaal.
- "Mad Scientist": Monster parody with an evil scientist (Bill Cosby in season one; Morgan Freeman in seasons 2–6) and his Peter Lorre-esque assistant Igor (Luis Ávalos), who tried to read words associated with their experiments.
- "Monolith": Animated short, set in outer space and used to introduce segments involving a phonic. A large, rectangular pillar of rock (as seen in 2001: A Space Odyssey, but depicted white instead of the film's black depiction to avoid plagiarism concerns from MGM Studios, the rights holder at the time), was shown disturbed by aliens or astronauts, then shuddering and collapsing during a music bed of the entire opening fanfare of Richard Strauss' Also Sprach Zarathustra. The letters of the phonic would appear from the clearing dust, and a bass voice would pronounce it. Similar segments for "Me" and "Amor" were featured on Sesame Street. The "Monolith" segments were almost entirely animated and directed by Fred Calvert and produced at Fred Calvert Productions.
- "Pedro's Plant Place": Featured Luis Ávalos as a garden-shop proprietor who incorporated words into his planting tips, accompanied by the plant-language-speaking guard plant Maurice (Jim Boyd).
- "Phyllis and the Pharaohs": A 1950s-style doo-wop group, with Rita Moreno singing lead and the male adult cast on backup.
- "Road Runner": New cartoons featuring the Looney Tunes character and his pursuer, Wile E. Coyote, produced and directed by Chuck Jones, which reinforced reading skills with words on signs encountered by the characters; used occasional sound and verbal effects.
- "Sign Sing-Along": Often the last sketch on a Friday, these films featured signs with words accompanied by a sing-along song. They were sung once through; viewers supplied the lyrics the second time, while a trumpet-and-bassoon duo played the melody.
- "The Six-Dollar and Thirty-Nine-Cent Man": A parody of The Six Million Dollar Man in season six, with Jim Boyd as Steve Awesome, Luis Ávalos as Awesome's boss Oscar and Hattie Winston as the General; the other adult cast members played villains.
- "Slow Reader": Animated or live-action shorts in which a slow reader was given a message to read by a delivery man. Each message had advice that he needed to follow, but because of his inability to sound out the words, he often wound up in trouble.
- "Soft-Shoe Silhouettes": Two people in silhouette, one making the initial sound of a word and the other the rest of the word; the two then said the word in unison. The soft-shoe music itself was composed by Joe Raposo, one of the Children's Television Workshop in-house composers at the time.
- "Spidey Super Stories": Short pieces debuting during season four and featuring Spider-Man (played by Danny Seagren from 1974 to 1977) foiling petty criminals. Spidey was never seen out of costume as his alter ego, Peter Parker, and he spoke in speech balloons for the audience to read. A spin-off comic book, Spidey Super Stories, was produced by Marvel Comics from 1974 to 1982.
- "Vaudeville Revue": Skits and songs presented in variety-show style on stage, with music fanfare and canned applause; also called the Stage.
- "A Very Short Book": Sometimes the last sketch of the episode. A cast member read a nursery rhyme or story, turning the pages of a book that showed both the sentences and film footage of the action. The stories usually had a humorous ending that was different from the original.
- "Vi's Diner": Lee Chamberlin played the proprietor of a diner where customers read simple menus to place their orders.
- "Wild Guess": A game-show send-up (similar to You Bet Your Life) with announcer Ken Kane (Bill Cosby in season 1, Morgan Freeman in seasons 2–6) and host Bess West (Rita Moreno), in which the contestant would guess the day's secret word. When the word was not guessed, West would give three clues as to what the word was.

== Selected recurring characters ==
- The Blond-Haired Cartoon Man (Mel Brooks): a character who would read words appearing on screen. However, they often showed up in the wrong order or made no sense. Thus, the character would resort to correcting the words.
- The Blue Beetle (Jim Boyd): a bungling superhero who often made matters worse instead of better when he tried to help; he often challenged Spider-Man.
- Clayton: a claymation character, animated by Will Vinton during season six, who commented on the previous skit or introduced a new concept.
- The Corsican Twins (Skip Hinnant and Jim Boyd): twin swashbuckler brothers who taught phonics. Whenever either brother hurt himself, the other one felt the pain and reacted accordingly.
- Dr. Doolots (Luis Ávalos): a parody of Doctor Dolittle and Groucho Marx who used words to cure his patients.
- Easy Reader (Morgan Freeman): a smooth hipster who loves reading and is associated with Valerie the Librarian (Hattie Winston) and Vi (Lee Chamberlin) in her diner. The character's name was a pun on Easy Rider.
- Fargo North, Decoder (Skip Hinnant): an Inspector Clouseau-type detective who decoded scrambled word messages and phrases for clients. His name was a pun on Fargo, North Dakota.
- J. Arthur Crank (Jim Boyd): a plaid-wearing grouchy character, who interrupted sketches to complain when spellings or pronunciations confused him. His name is a reference to movie producer J. Arthur Rank.
- Lorelei the Chicken (Jim Boyd): an animated chicken who appeared in live-action scenes. She was a caricature of actress Carol Channing.
- Mel Mounds (Morgan Freeman): a disc jockey who introduced songs, usually by the Short Circus.
- The Monsters: Werewolf (Jim Boyd), Frankenstein (Skip Hinnant), and Dracula (Morgan Freeman).
- Millie the Helper (Rita Moreno): an eager-beaver trainee working at various jobs. She was the first to shout, "Hey, you GUYS!"—a phrase that was eventually incorporated into the opening credits. The character's name is likely a reference to a character on The Dick Van Dyke Show.
- Otto the Director (Rita Moreno): a short-tempered film director, a take-off of Otto Preminger, who tried in vain to get her actors to say their lines correctly, with the help of a cue card to highlight the word they kept missing.
- Pandora the Brat (Rita Moreno): Bratty-but-lovable blonde girl who tried to outwit the adults around her.
- Paul the Gorilla (Jim Boyd): the sidekick of Jennifer of the Jungle; named after head writer Paul Dooley.
- Vincent the Vegetable Vampire (Morgan Freeman): a send-up of Dracula who was obsessed with eating vegetables.

The adult cast also had recurring roles as Spider-Man (Danny Seagren) (seasons 4–6 (1974–1977)), J.J. (Skip Hinnant), Carmela (Rita Moreno), Brenda (Lee Chamberlin) (seasons 1–2 (1971–1973)), Mark (Morgan Freeman), Hank (Bill Cosby) (seasons 1–2 (1971–1973)), Roberto (Luis Ávalos) (seasons 2–6 (1972–1977)), Winnie (Judy Graubart), Andy (Jim Boyd), and Sylvia (Hattie Winston) (seasons 3–6 (1973–1977)).

== Short Circus ==
Another regular part of the show was the Short Circus (a pun on short circuit), a five-member singing band whose songs also facilitated reading comprehension. June Angela was the only Short Circus member to remain with the show during its entire six-year run. Others lasted anywhere from one to four years. Irene Cara appeared during the first season (1971–1972) and would go on to become a pop-music star. Cara was replaced in the second season (1972–1973) by Denise Nickerson, who previously appeared on the ABC daytime series Dark Shadows and was best known for her appearance as Violet Beauregarde in the 1971 film Willy Wonka & the Chocolate Factory.

The other three original members of the Short Circus were singer and guitarist Melanie Henderson; drummer and singer Stephen Gustafson; and singer, tambourinist, and guitarist Douglas Grant. For seasons three (1973–1974) and four (1974–1975), Grant and Nickerson were replaced by tap dancer Gregg Burge and Broadway actress Bayn Johnson.

With the exception of June Angela, who continued, a new Short Circus was cast for the show's fifth and sixth season (1975–1977). The new hires were Todd Graff, singer Rodney Lewis, Réjane Magloire, and singer Janina Matthews.

For the first season (1971–1972), a number of uncredited children were also used on-camera with the show's cast, as on Sesame Street, but this concept was dropped.

As on Sesame Street, the frequent reuse of segments, actors continued to appear on the show after their departures from the cast.

== The Short Circus members ==
- June Angela as Julie (tambourine)
- Irene Cara as Iris (keyboards 1971–1972)
- Stephen Gustafson as Buddy (drums 1971–1975)
- Melanie Henderson as Kathy (guitar 1971–1975)
- Douglas Grant as Zach (1971–1973; percussion 1971–1972; guitar 1972–1973)
- Denise Nickerson as Allison (1972–1973)
- Bayn Johnson as Kelly (guitar 1973–1975)
- Gregg Burge as Dwayne (bass 1973–1975)
- Janina Mathews as Gail (1975–1977)
- Réjane Magloire as Samantha (1975–1977)
- Rodney Lewis as Charlie (1975–1977)
- Todd Graff as Jesse (1975–1977; guitar 1976–1977)

== Guest appearances ==
The Electric Company also featured celebrity guest appearances, including the following:

- Woody Allen
- Big Bird (performed by Caroll Spinney) (1972)
- Victor Borge (1972)
- Carol Burnett (1972–1973)
- Barbara Eden (1972)
- Walt Frazier
- Peter Graves
- Lorne Greene (1972–1973)
- Grover (performed by Frank Oz)
- Elvin Hayes
- Diane Keaton
- Michael Landon (1972–1973)
- Dean Martin (1973)
- Dick Martin (1972)
- Greg Morris
- Joe Namath (1972)
- Carroll O'Connor (1972)
- Tony Orlando
- Oscar the Grouch (performed by Caroll Spinney) (1975)
- Gary Owens (1972–1973)
- Richard Paul (1976)
- Dan Rowan (1972)
- Jean Stapleton (1972)
- Lily Tomlin (1972)
- Willie Tyler

== Music ==
With the exception of Tom Lehrer, all the individuals listed below were Children's Television Workshop in-house composers.

- Joe Raposo, who was famous for his work on Sesame Street, was the music director of the series for Seasons 1–3 and wrote songs for the show during its entire run.
- Gary William Friedman, who wrote the music for the hit Broadway rock opera The Me Nobody Knows, was the music director and composer for Season 4, composer for an additional 260 episodes, and wrote some 40 songs, including the popular Spider-Man theme song.
- Tom Lehrer, a satirist and pianist, wrote 10 songs for the series. Two of those songs, "L-Y" and "Silent E" (whose visual segment was directed by Clark Gist and animated by Tony Benedict), were included as bonus tracks on the CD issue of his second live album, while the boxed set The Remains of Tom Lehrer included five songs from the show, with the original recordings of "L-Y", "Silent E", "O-U (The Hound Song)", and "S-N (Snore, Sniff, and Sneeze)", along with a new recording of "N Apostrophe T".
- Dave Conner was the music director for Seasons 5–6.
- Clark Gesner wrote several songs for the series, including most of the sign songs but never served as the show's official music coordinator, a position that fell to Raposo's ensemble percussionist Danny Epstein.
- Eric Rogers, who composed the music for the DePatie-Freleng cartoons in the '70s. He was the additional music composer for 260 episodes of The Electric Company, and wrote some new songs, including the arrangement from The Electric Company theme song.

The original soundtrack album, released on Warner Bros. Records, won a Grammy Award for the show's cast.

== Visuals ==
The series was notable for its extensive, innovative use of early computer-generated imagery, especially Scanimate, a then-state-of-the-art analog video-synthesizer system. They were often used for presenting words with particular sounds. Sometimes a cast member would be seen alongside or interacting in another way with a word animation.

== Show numbering ==
Comedian, actor and writer Paul Dooley created the series and served as head writer. A total of 780 episodes were produced in the show's six-season run, 130 per season. As with Sesame Street, each episode of The Electric Company was numbered on-screen instead of using traditional episode titles. Seasons One through Four were numbered 1–520 (1971–1975). Season five was numbered 1A–130A (1975–1976), while season six was numbered 1B–130B (1976–1977). The last two seasons were designated as such because they were designed as year-long curricula for schools.

Starting with season three, a show's number would be presented in the sketch-of-the-day teaser segment, a parody of soap-opera teasers, which would highlight a particular sketch that would be shown during that episode. The voice of a cast member would say a variant of, "Today on The Electric Company, the so-and so says, '(bleep)'," and the action would freeze as the graphic of the word of the day (or a card with the word of the day printed on it) became visible to viewers. The redacted words were replaced by a series of Minimoog sounds that roughly mimicked the modulation of the word or phrase in question so children could guess them. The still action would linger on the screen for several seconds, then fade to black, where the show number would become visible in a Scanimate animation in a random color. The music for this segment was a repetitive, funky instrumental groove featuring a call-and-response between horns and a scratchy wah-wah electric guitar.

The next-show teaser, which was introduced in season two without music, worked in the same way, and usually used a different take of the music heard during the sketch-of-the-day teaser, except that the voice said "Tune in next time, when...," and there was no show number shown.

In season one, however, after the title sequence, the sound of a striking match would be heard, and a fade-up from black would reveal a hand holding a lit match and "Show #x" handwritten on a piece of paper that was placed in such a way so that it could blend with the surrounding objects in-frame. Instead of the next-show teaser, Ken Roberts's voice could be heard, saying, "And now, the last word," and the trademark light bulb would be shut off by a hand doing whatever the last word was. In season two, after the opening sequence the words "The Electric Company" would disappear from the logo, and the show number would appear in its place through the use of a Scanimate animation and an electronic whooshing sound.

Notably, some episodes in seasons three through five had serious technical errors with either their sketch-of-the-day teaser segments or their next-show teaser segments, which was probably because of the failure of the linear analog video-editing equipment. Episodes that have these errors in their sketch-of-the-day teasers include 297, 390, 1A, 8A, and 15A—sometimes the music started too late, ended too early, or played too long; sometimes the errors are negligible, with the teaser music only playing a fraction of a second longer than usual.

For season six, because the teaser music was changed to a shorter, self-contained composition, these errors do not occur, with the exception of the teaser of 33B shown at the end of 32B (available on iTunes), where the teaser was accidentally cut by a fraction of a second.

== Cancellation ==
The Electric Company was canceled in 1977 at the height of its popularity. Unlike its counterpart Sesame Street, which licensed its Muppet characters for merchandising, The Electric Company never had a stand-alone brand or character that could have helped generate additional profits. The only significant items the show licensed were comic books and a Milton Bradley board game of the Fargo North, Decoder character. Licensing rights were also granted to Mattel Electronics for two educational-based video games for the Intellivision console in 1979. These games featured both the show's title logo on the game's packaging and label and the first several notes of the theme song played on the title screen of the games.

Also, the PBS stations and statewide networks that aired the show often complained of the Children's Television Workshop "soaking up so much money in public television", said veteran television producer Samuel Gibbon, who worked on the show. "The stations demanded that one of the programs—either Sesame Street or The Electric Company—be put into reruns to save money. By that time, Sesame Street was a cash fountain for the Workshop. The show was almost supporting itself by then with all the productions, books, records, and games. There was no way, it was felt, that they could reduce the number of original shows of Sesame Street. But the thought was that if we produce two final seasons of The Electric Company that were designed to be repeated, that would give the show four more years of life." Most PBS programs at the time were produced entirely by local stations, instead of being the work of independent producers like CTW. The final episode of The Electric Company featured a short musical and dance number featuring the final cast members (with the exception of Bill Cosby and Lee Chamberlin, who had had long since left the show, and Rita Moreno, who did not take part in this episode) including the then-current members of the Short Circus. The lyrics of the song summed up the closure of the series:

We're glad you came to call. We really had a ball. The show is done; we hate to run; we're sorry, but that's all.

After the last original episode on April 15, 1977, The Electric Company continued on PBS in reruns until early October 1985.

== Revivals ==
=== 1999 rebroadcast ===
The earlier shows resurfaced on February 2, 1999, when the Noggin network, which was partly owned by CTW at the time, rebroadcast the show as a result of its co-ownership of the network. Noggin created a two-hour compilation special to re-introduce the series to a new generation. The special was aired on TV Land as a way to promote Noggin.

Noggin ran 65 select episodes until mid-2003, when they were pulled from the program lineup because Sesame Workshop sold its half of the network to Viacom, which already owned the other half. The shows were cut subtly to fit Noggin's shorter running time and free up time for various interstitial segments produced for the network. These deletions included the episode numbers, the Scanimate word animations, the segments of up to 15 seconds, and the teasers of the next episodes (in seasons 2–6).

During the same period as the Noggin rebroadcasts, numerous fans of the program produced QuickTime and MP3 clips from the Noggin rebroadcasts, old over-the-air recordings, and, in some cases, from master recordings. These were hosted online at various places and received heavy attention from the blogosphere (e.g., Boing Boing) until a cease-and-desist letter took down the most prominent of these sites in 2004.

=== DVD releases ===
The series was not seen since it was pulled from Noggin's schedule until Sesame Workshop, under license to Shout! Factory, released a DVD boxed set on February 7, 2006, called The Best of the Electric Company that included 20 uncut episodes from throughout the show's run, including the first and last episodes, plus outtakes and introductions and commentary by Rita Moreno and June Angela.

Due to the overwhelming—and somewhat unexpected—popularity of the initial DVD release, a second boxed set was released on November 14, 2006 (The Best of the Electric Company: Volume 2). This second volume contained 20 episodes from seasons one through five plus a 30-minute documentary on the effects of in-school viewings of The Electric Company from 1975. Cast members Luis Ávalos, Jim Boyd, Judy Graubart, Skip Hinnant, and Hattie Winston provided commentary and reflected on their years on the show. However, the original content of nine episodes presented in this set were altered. In some cases, material that was originally broadcast in a particular episode was removed completely while material from other episodes was included. For example, 60A originally contained the Spider-Man episode "Spidey Meets the Prankster" and used a scene from that sketch as the opening teaser, which was removed completely (due to Marvel Entertainment licensing) after the opening credits, leaving only the episode number. Also removed after the Letterman sketch in this episode was the clip of the Short Circus singing "Stop!" and a Road Runner–Wile E. Coyote cartoon (due to Warner Bros. licensing). These altered episodes also contain special effects used to segue from one sketch to another that were not used in the show's original run. The other altered episodes are 197, 227, 322, 375, 35A, 57A, 77A, and 105A.

It is believed that these changes were probably made to avoid repeats of segments that were on the first DVD set, but it is more likely that it was due to ownership rights—the segments that were used to cover up the material not under Sesame Workshop's control (Spider-Man, Road Runner and Wile E. Coyote, etc.) were longer than the excised segments, so the episodes were cut further to get them down to their required 28-minute length.

An hour-long television show called The Electric Company's Greatest Hits & Bits was broadcast on many PBS stations in late 2006. It included interviews with cast members, voice talent, and creator-producer Joan Ganz Cooney. The special was produced by Authorized Pictures and distributed by American Public Television, and was designed to be seen during pledge drives. It was released on DVD on March 6, 2007.

=== iTunes ===
In early 2007, Apple Inc., through its iTunes service, started selling 15 previously unavailable episodes of The Electric Company. "Volume 1" contained Episodes 5, 13, 23, 128, 179, 249, 261, 289, 297, 374, 416, 475, 91A, 8B, and 32B.

In late 2007, another collection of 15 episodes dubbed "Volume 2" became available from iTunes. The new additions were Episodes 2, 36, 40, 75, 142, 154, 165, 172, 189, 218, 245, 290, 337, and 350. Repeated from Volume 1 was Episode 8B, erroneously labeled as 658, even though it is correct if the A–B designations were disregarded (1A–130A are 521–650, 1B–130B are 651–780).

It is unclear if these episodes were altered from the versions originally shown on television. Shout! Factory representatives indicated that it had no plans for another DVD set, implying that episodes distributed via iTunes would not be available in another format.

== International broadcasts ==
In Australia, The Electric Company aired on ABC in the mid-1970s and in 1979–80 on the Ten Network. It aired on SBS in 1984–89.

== See also ==
- Crashbox
