= Judy Graubart =

American actress and comedian

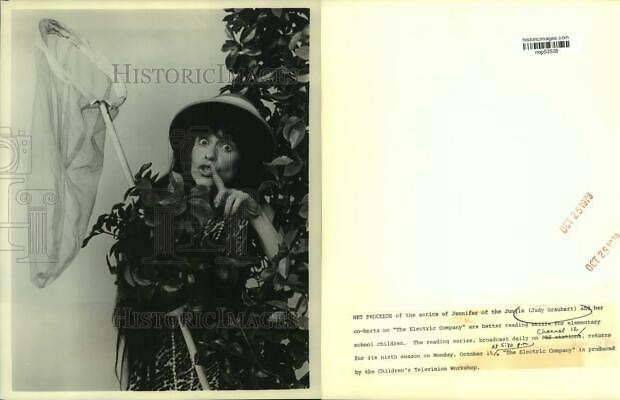
- Occupations: Actress, comedian
- Years active: 1970–1999

Judy Graubart is an American actress and comedian. She is best known for being a regular cast member of The Electric Company, the pioneering children's show from the 1970s produced by the Children's Television Workshop.

== Career ==
Graubart was in the Second City comedy troupe, appearing in the Chicago mainstage cast in the mid- to late 1960s with comic actors such as Fred Willard, Peter Boyle, Richard Libertini, Bob Dishy and Robert Klein. She was also a regular on Comedy Tonight, which aired during the summer of 1970 on CBS, along with Peter Boyle, Barbara Cason, Madeline Kahn, Robert Klein, and Jerry Lacy.

Graubart first made an uncredited appearance in Arthur Hiller's 1967 kidnap comedy The Tiger Makes Out, as a pedestrian with an umbrella whom mailman Eli Wallach attempts to kidnap. He lassos a fire hydrant instead. Graubart's fellow Second City actor Bob Dishy co-stars as the husband of Wallach's ultimate kidnap victim, Anne Jackson.

Graubart played hundreds of characters on the show during The Electric Company's original six-year run, with Jennifer of the Jungle being one of the most notable.

After her run with The Electric Company, she appeared in several films during the early 1980s, including Marshall Brickman's Simon and Author! Author! which starred Al Pacino. She reunited with Madeline Kahn for the 1999 film Judy Berlin, which was completed shortly before Kahn's death.

Throughout her career, Graubart was also a familiar face in television commercials for products such as the Chevrolet Vega, Cheer, Crunch 'n Munch, Shake 'n Bake and Miracle Whip, as well as extensive commercial voice over work. Graubart appeared, as did many other of the original cast members of The Electric Company, in interviews and episode introductions on the second volume of The Best of the Electric Company DVD boxed set that was released by Shout! Factory and Sony BMG Music Entertainment on November 14, 2006.

Graubart has also appeared in theater, appearing in Steppenwolf Theater's Off-Broadway production of Orphans in 1986.
