= Luis Ávalos =

Cuban character actor (1946–2014)

- Born: September 2, 1946; Havana, Cuba
- Died: January 22, 2014 (aged 67); Burbank, California, U.S.
- Resting place: Forest Lawn Memorial Park, Hollywood Hills
- Education: New York University (MFA)
- Occupation: Actor
- Years active: 1970–2008

Luis Ávalos (September 2, 1946 – January 22, 2014) was an American character actor. A Cuban-American, he made numerous film and television appearances, most notably in the 1971–1977 children's television show The Electric Company.

== Early years ==
After being born in Havana, Cuba, Ávalos came to the United States with his family when he was a child. He earned a degree in theater from New York University.

== Career ==
Ávalos acted with the Lincoln Center Repertory Theater. His Broadway credits include Narrow Road to the Deep North (1972), The Good Woman of Setzuan (1970), Beggar on Horseback (1970), and Camino Real (1970).

In 1972, Avalos was a cast member on the PBS children’s TV show The Electric Company, most notably playing Doctor Doolots (a play on Doctor Dolittle). He joined the show in its second season and stayed until the show’s cancellation in 1977. He was good friends with fellow Electric Company star Rita Moreno. His most notable movie role was as Ramon in the 1979 comedy Hot Stuff, in which he starred alongside Jerry Reed, Dom DeLuise, and Suzanne Pleshette.

Ávalos also starred as Jesse Rodriguez on the short-lived situation comedy Condo with McLean Stevenson and as Dr. Tomas Esquivel on the short-lived situation comedy E/R with Elliott Gould and Mary McDonnell. He played Dr. Sanchez on Highcliffe Manor on NBC in 1979 and Crecencio Salos in Ned Blessing: The True Story of My Life on CBS in 1993. Additionally, he starred as Stavi in the comedy The Ringer with Johnny Knoxville.

Avalos appeared on Barney Miller. He was in the episode "Chase" in 1977 and the episode "Bones" in 1982.

In 1989, Avalos made a guest appearance as a judge on Perry Mason: The Case of the Musical Murder.

In 2000, he founded the Americas Theatre Arts Foundation in Los Angeles to support Latin American-inspired dramatic productions.

== Death ==
Avalos died on January 22, 2014, of heart failure, after a heart attack. He was buried at Forest Lawn Memorial Park (Hollywood Hills) in Los Angeles at Burbank.

== Filmography ==
Film
Year	Title	Role	Notes
1973	Badge 373	Chico	
1979	Hot Stuff	Ramon	
1980	The Hunter	Poker Player #3	
1980	Sunday Lovers		(segment "Skippy")
1980	Stir Crazy	Chico	
1982	Love Child	Tony	
1986	Ghost Fever	Benny	
1989	Criminal Act	Coroner	
1991	Fires Within	Victor Hernandez	
1991	The Butcher's Wife	Luis	
1995	Lone Justice 2	Crecencio	
1996	Lone Justice: Showdown at Plum Creek	Crecencio	
1997	Jungle 2 Jungle	Abe	
1999	Love Stinks	Judge	
2002	Wishcraft	Mayor Phelan	
2003	Hollywood Homicide	Det. Willie Palmero	
2005	The Ringer	Stavi	
2008	Five Dollars a Day	Martinez	(final film role)
