= Jim Boyd (actor) =

American actor (1933-2013)

- Born: James Andrew Boyd; November 11, 1933; Philadelphia, Pennsylvania, US
- Died: January 2, 2013 (aged 79); New York City, US
- Known for: Actor on The Electric Company

James Andrew Boyd (November 11, 1933 – January 2, 2013) was an American actor.

== Life and career ==
Boyd spent four years in the Air Force and studied at the American Academy of Dramatic Arts.

He did voice work (along with Wayland Flowers and Cleavon Little) for puppets on The Surprise Show, a children's program that aired locally in the New York City area during the 1960s. The puppets used on the show, called Aniforms, had been developed by puppeteer Morey Bunin.

In 1971, the Children's Television Workshop (now Sesame Workshop) contacted Boyd because it wanted to use Aniforms in a television show that became known as The Electric Company. During the first season, Boyd's voice was used extensively, especially for the character J. Arthur Crank, who was just an angry voice on the telephone at the time. Boyd was unseen until season two, when he became a visibly regular cast member, appearing on-camera until the show stopped production in 1977. Other characters he played included Andy, Wolfman, Blue Beetle, Paul the Gorilla, Fred Baxter, Steve Awesome, and Lorelei Loverly.

Boyd also appeared in the 1974 TV movie Out to Lunch, a Children's Television Workshop production in which the Muppets and casts of Sesame Street and The Electric Company take over the ABC News when the newsroom staff takes a lunch break. In 1993, Boyd played the role of Howard Turner in the TV series Law & Order. In 2006, he appeared in the TV documentary The Electric Company's Greatest Hits & Bits, talking about his experience on The Electric Company in an interview.

Boyd was the on-camera talent or voiceover talent for a number of industrial videos for a large body of corporate training and communication videos during the 1990s.

== Death ==
Boyd died on January 2, 2013, following a short illness.

== Filmography ==
=== Television ===
Year	Title	Role	Notes
1971–1977	The Electric Company	Andy / J. Arthur Crank / Loreli Loverly / Max / Paul the Gorilla / Steve Awesome the $6.39 Man / The Blue Beetle / The Wolfman / The Wall	780 episodes
1978	Space Force	Captain Leon Stoner	TV movie
1993	Law & Order	Howard Turner	Episode: "Sweeps"; final role
