= Skip Hinnant =

American actor (1940–2026)

- Born: Joseph Howard Hinnant; September 12, 1940; Chincoteague Island, Virginia, U.S.
- Died: November 8, 2026 (aged 86); Denver, Colorado, U.S.
- Occupations: Actor; comedian; singer
- Years active: 1963–1990; 2006
- Children: 4
- Relatives: Bill Hinnant (brother)

Joseph Howard "Skip" Hinnant (September 12, 1940 – November 8, 2026) was an American actor, comedian and singer, best known for his work in children's television and musical theater. Hinnant's career spanned voice acting, stage performances, and singing, beginning in the 1960s. He also appeared in films and various theater productions, contributing to both entertainment and children's educational programming.

== Life and career ==
Hinnant's first major role was as Cathy's boyfriend, Ted, on The Patty Duke Show from 1963 to 1965. In 1967, he played Schroeder in the original off-Broadway cast of Clark Gesner's You're a Good Man, Charlie Brown, where his older brother, Bill Hinnant, played Snoopy.

Hinnant is best known as a featured performer on the children's show The Electric Company, which aired on the American educational television network PBS from 1971 to 1977. He was best known at that time as word decoder Fargo North, Decoder (a play on "Fargo, North Dakota") and as "The Boy" in the soap opera satire "Love of Chair."

Despite generally being known for acting in more family-friendly works, Hinnant also performed in adult animation, providing the voice of Fritz the Cat in both the 1972 animated film of the same name and its 1974 sequel, The Nine Lives of Fritz the Cat.

In 1977, he voiced the Easter Bunny in the Rankin/Bass made-for-television, stop-motion animated feature The Easter Bunny Is Comin' To Town, and in 1980, he provided the voice for the title character Pogo Possum in the direct-to-video feature film I Go Pogo (also done in stop-motion). His most recent acting roles were an appearance in the PBS science education show 3-2-1 Contact as Flash Jordan in the episode Measurement: How Fast? How Slow? on November 2, 1984, and a part in an episode of Kate & Allie as Bob Barsky's boss Brian Keyes in the episode "I've Got a Secret" on February 27, 1989. Then he retired from television acting and devoted his entire career to voice-over work at the beginning of the 1990s, but in 2006, he made appearances in two retrospectives of The Electric Company: one was a PBS pledge drive special, the other was The Best of the Electric Company: Vol. 2.

He was the longest-serving president of the New York branch of the Screen Actors Guild.

Hinnant died in Denver, Colorado, on November 8, 2026, at the age of 86.

== Filmography ==
- 1963–1965: The Patty Duke Show as Ted (6 episodes)
- 1966: The Plastic Dome of Norma Jean as Francis
- 1971–1977: The Electric Company as Jay Jay and Various characters (most notably Fargo North, Decoder)
- 1972: Fritz the Cat as Fritz the Cat (voice)
- 1974: The Nine Lives of Fritz the Cat as Fritz the Cat (voice)
- 1977: The Easter Bunny Is Comin' to Town as Sunny the Easter Bunny (voice)
- 1980: I Go Pogo as Pogo Possum (voice)
- 1984: 3-2-1 Contact as Flash Jordan (one episode)
- 1986: My Little Pony and Friends (various voices)
- 1988: As the World Turns as Mr. Leversee (one episode)
- 1989: Kate & Allie as Brian Keyes (one episode)
- 1990: Alexander and the Terrible, Horrible, No Good, Very Bad Day as Shoe Salesman (voice)
