= Bill Hinnant =

American actor (1935–1978)

- Hinnant as Homer in God Bless Coney (1972)
- Born: John Fletcher Hinnant Jr. August 28, 1935; Chincoteague Island, Virginia, U.S.
- Died: February 17, 1978 (aged 42); Dominican Republic
- Other name: William Hinnant
- Education: Yale University
- Occupation: Actor
- Years active: 1958–1978
- Relatives: Skip Hinnant (brother)

William Hinnant (born John Fletcher Hinnant, Jr.; August 28, 1935 – February 17, 1978) was an American actor. He is best known for playing Snoopy in the off-Broadway production You're a Good Man, Charlie Brown. His younger brother was actor and comedian Skip Hinnant.

== Biography ==
Hinnant was born John Fletcher Hinnant, Jr. in Chincoteague Island, Virginia. He attended Yale University, but left after his sophomore year in 1955 to originate the role of the navigator in the Broadway play No Time for Sergeants. He later returned to Yale, and graduated in 1959.

After completing college, Hinnant appeared in the Julius Monk revue Dressed to the Nines. In the late 1950s and early 1960s, he appeared in few theatre roles and guest starred on various television programs, including four episodes of the CBS sitcom, Pete and Gladys. He was cast as Bruce Carter, a 26-year-old college student (though he had already graduated from Yale in real life) who lives temporarily in Westwood, Los Angeles, California, with his aunt, Gladys (Cara Williams), and her husband, insurance salesman, Pete Porter (Harry Morgan). Hinnant also appeared on the long-running CBS game show, To Tell the Truth. He was cast in the Off-Broadway show, All Kinds of Giants and the revue Put it in Writing in 1962 and 1963.

Hinnant's most successful role came in March 1967, when he was cast as Snoopy in the off-Broadway production of Clark Gesner's You're a Good Man, Charlie Brown, after voicing the character on Gesner's ten-song concept album. Hinnant (whose younger brother Skip was cast as Schroeder in the same production) was praised as the "most strikingly talented of the cast" and won a Drama Desk Award for his performance. Theatre critic Steven Suskin wrote, "As in Snoopy's showstopper 'Suppertime' - you totally forgot the teensy scale. When Bill Hinnant leapt from atop his doghouse and went into a cakewalk, the spirit and the show soared."

After ...Charlie Brown, Hinnant appeared in the musical Love Match, based on the life of Queen Victoria and Prince Albert of Saxe-Coburg and Gotha in the role of Boy Jones. The show, written by David Shire and Richard Maltby, closed prior to opening on Broadway. He later appeared in Norman Kline's The American Hamburger League off-Broadway in September 1969. He then appeared in the 1971 Broadway musical Frank Merriwell. Though he was cast in the title role of the 1972 Broadway musical Hurry, Harry, he departed the show before opening, and another musical he appeared in the same year, God Bless Coney Off-Broadway, closed in less than a week.

When You're a Good Man, Charlie Brown was adapted for a Hallmark Hall of Fame television special in 1973, Hinnant reprised his role as Snoopy. Hinnant was the only member of the original off-Broadway cast to reprise his role in the special.

Hinnant died at age 42 on February 17, 1978. He drowned while vacationing in the Dominican Republic. In February 1990, archival footage posthumously showed Hinnant singing "Suppertime" in the Peanuts documentary You Don't Look 40, Charlie Brown!
