= Kite Eating Tree (disambiguation) =

The Kite-Eating Tree is a fictional tree featured in the Peanuts comic strip by Charles M. Schulz.

Kite Eating Tree may also refer to one of several Peanuts themed rides at Cedar Fair amusement parks in the United States:

- Kite Eating Tree, Kings Island#Planet Snoopy, Kings Mills, Ohio
- Kite Eating Tree, Cedar Point, Sandusky, Ohio
- Kite Eating Tree, Dorney Park & Wildwater Kingdom, Allentown, Pennsylvania
- Kite Eating Tree, Valleyfair, Shakopee, Minnesota
- Kite Eating Tree, Worlds of Fun, Kansas City, Missouri
