= You're a Good Man, Charlie Brown =

1967 musical comedy based on Charles Schulz's Peanuts

- 1971 Broadway windowcard for the John Golden Theatre
- Music: Clark Gesner
- Lyrics: Clark Gesner
- Book: John Gordon
- Basis: Comic strip Peanuts by Charles M. Schulz
- Productions: 1967 Off-Broadway; 1968 West End; 1968 U.S. Tour; 1969 U.S. Tour; 1970 U.S. Tour; 1971 Broadway; 1998 U.S. Tour; 1999 Broadway revival; 2016 Off-Broadway revival
- Awards: 1967 Outer Critics Circle Award for Best Production; 1999 Drama Desk Award for Outstanding Revival of a Musical

You're a Good Man, Charlie Brown is a 1967 musical with music and lyrics by Clark Gesner and (in a 1999 revision) Andrew Lippa. It is based on the characters created by cartoonist Charles M. Schulz in his comic strip Peanuts. The musical has been a popular choice for amateur theatre productions because of its small cast and simple staging.

== Background ==
John Gordon was credited with the book of the show, but according to Gesner's foreword in the published script, "John Gordon" is a collective pseudonym that covers Gesner, the cast members, and the production staff, all of whom worked together to assemble the script. The Guide to Musical Theatre notes that "John Gordon is a pseudonym for the staff and cast of the show. The original cast included Bob Balaban, Gary Burghoff, Bill Hinnant, Skip Hinnant, Karen Johnson and Reva Rose."

== History ==
During the early 1960s, Gesner had begun writing songs based on Charles Schulz's Peanuts characters, but was unable to get permission from United Feature Syndicate to use the characters in his songs. Eventually Gesner sent Schulz a demo recording of some of the songs and Gesner soon had permission to properly record them, which he did in 1966. Orson Bean sang the role of Charlie Brown, Clark Gesner sang Linus, Barbara Minkus sang Lucy, and Bill Hinnant sang Snoopy (he reprised his role in the Off-Broadway production).

At the time, Gesner had no plans for a musical based on this pre-production "concept album". However, producer Arthur Whitelaw, who would later go on to write another musical based on Peanuts entitled: Snoopy! The Musical, encouraged Gesner to turn the album into a musical.

The stage adaptation of the concept album, titled You're a Good Man, Charlie Brown, went into rehearsal in New York City on February 10, 1967. Prior to its opening, the musical had no actual libretto; it was several vignettes with a musical number for each one.

== Productions ==
=== Original New York productions and U.S. tours ===
Clark Gesner with director Joseph Hardy and the original 1967 cast of You're a Good Man, Charlie Brown

On March 7, 1967, the musical premiered off-Broadway at Theatre 80 in the East Village, featuring Gary Burghoff as Charlie Brown, Skip Hinnant as Schroeder, Reva Rose as Lucy, Bob Balaban as Linus, Karen Johnson as Patty (an early Peanuts character not to be confused with Peppermint Patty), and Bill Hinnant as Snoopy. Joseph Hardy directed and choreographer Patricia Birch was billed as "Assistant to the Director". Joe Raposo, later of Sesame Street fame, was billed as "Music Director" and composer of incidental music for the show. This production of You're A Good Man, Charlie Brown lasted 1,597 performances, closing on February 14, 1971.

The off-Broadway cast recording, originally released on MGM Records, was later remastered by Decca Broadway/Universal Classics and re-released on September 31, 2000. A 1970 U.S. tour lasted 202 performances on the road.

A Broadway production opened at the John Golden Theatre on June 1, 1971, and closed on June 27, 1971, after 32 performances and 15 previews. Directed by Joseph Hardy and with choreography by Patricia Birch, the new cast consisted of Carter Cole as Schroeder, Grant Cowan as Snoopy, Stephen Fenning as Linus, Liz O'Neal as Lucy, Dean Stolber as Charlie Brown, and Lee Wilson as Patty.

=== 1968 West End premiere ===
None of the cast is actually six years old. And they don't
really look like Charles Schulz' "Peanuts" cartoon
characters. But this doesn't seem to make that much
difference once we are into the play, because what
they are saying to each other is with the openness of
that early childhood time, and the obvious fact is that
they are all really quite fond of each other. — Clark Gesner

The musical opened in the West End in London on February 1, 1968, produced by Harold Fielding and Bernard Delfont, and directed by original 1967 director Joseph Hardy. It played at the Fortune Theatre for 116 performances, until closing on May 11, 1968. The whole original Toronto cast reprised their roles for West End. Don Potter, who portrayed Snoopy, reprised his role in the original San Francisco cast of Snoopy! The Musical.

=== 1998 U.S. tour and 1999 Broadway revival ===
A U.S. tour began on November 18, 1998, in Skokie, Illinois. The tour was expected to become a full-scale revival to open at the Longacre Theatre on Broadway, but was moved to the Ambassador Theatre after Bring in 'Da Noise, Bring in 'Da Funk's closing. After the tour ended on January 17, 1999, the revival opened on February 4, 1999, and closed on June 13, 1999, having played 14 previews and 149 performances. It featured new dialogue by Michael Mayer, who also directed, and additional songs and orchestration written by Andrew Lippa; choreography was by Jerry Mitchell and sets by David Gallo, Mayer's frequent collaborator.

In this revival, the character of Patty was replaced with Sally Brown, inspired by the same change Schulz made in the animated TV adaptation. The cast featured Anthony Rapp as Charlie Brown, B.D. Wong as Linus, Ilana Levine as Lucy, and Stanley Wayne Mathis as Schroeder. Also featured were Kristin Chenoweth and Roger Bart as Sally and Snoopy, with each winning the Tony award in the respective category. Kirsten Wyatt was the standby for Lucy and Sally.

The original Broadway revival recording was released by RCA Victor/BMG on March 9, 1999.

The 1999 cast appeared on The Rosie O'Donnell Show to promote the show, singing "Beethoven Day." O'Donnell joined in with the cast to close her show by performing the finale as the credits rolled.

=== 2008 Manhattan benefit concert ===
On December 15, 2008, a one-night-only benefit performance of Charlie Brown was staged at the Gerald W. Lynch Theater at John Jay College in Manhattan for the Make-A-Wish Foundation, directed by David Lefkowich. The cast featured Morgan Karr as Charlie Brown, David Larsen as Schroeder, Tom Deckman as Snoopy, Matt Crowle as Linus, Carmen Ruby Floyd as Lucy, and Kenita R. Miller as Sally.

=== 2016 Off-Broadway revival ===
The musical was revived at the Off-Broadway York Theatre Company. The revival used some young actors from Broadway productions. The six-member “Peanuts” gang featured Joshua Colley as Charlie Brown, Gregory Diaz as Schroeder, Aidan Gemme as Snoopy, Milly Shapiro as Sally, Mavis Simpson-Ernst as Lucy, and Jeremy T. Villas as Linus. Graydon Peter Yosowitz played the role of Charlie Brown from June 1–7. The production ran from May 24 – June 26, 2016.

=== 2023 Off-West End revival ===
The London revival opened at Upstairs at the Gatehouse on December 14, 2023. Produced by Chromolume, it was directed by Amanda Noar with Isaac Bernier-Doyle as assistant director and Harry Style as musical director. The cast comprised Jordan Broatch as Charlie Brown, Troy Yip as Schroeder, Jacob Cornish as Linus, Oliver Sidney as Snoopy, Eleanor Fransch as Lucy, and Millie Robins as Sally. It closed on January 14, 2024.

=== 2024 Chinese premiere ===
After closing in London, Chromolume's production transferred to Shanghai in August, 2024 opening at the FANCL Arts Centre in co-production with iMusical, Hangzhou Grand Theatre, and Singapore ULC Education Group. The creative team and cast remained largely unchanged with Joǎo Almeida taking over as Charlie Brown and Poppy Austen joining as Sally. This marked the show's debut in China.

=== 2027 New York City Center Encores! ===
In April 2026, it was announced that Charlie Brown would open the 2027 New York City Center Encores! season from February 3 to 14. The production will be directed by Sam Pinkleton (Oh, Mary!, The Rocky Horror Show) and will use the original 1967 book and orchestrations rather than the 1999 revival's. The cast will include Danielle Brooks as Lucy, Ayo Edebiri as Snoopy, Jin Ha as Linus, David Hyde Pierce as Charlie Brown, Rachel Dratch as Patty, and Jeff Hiller as Schroeder.

== Synopsis ==
=== Original ===
Act I

Charlie Brown and Linus van Pelt are together, as his friends provide exposition and give their various opinions of him ("Opening"). One morning, Charlie Brown wakes to his friends celebrating him as a "good man" with the potential to do anything ("You're A Good Man, Charlie Brown"). Linus's older sister Lucy expresses her deep infatuation with Schroeder and asks him what he thinks of the idea of marriage. Schroeder is aware of her feelings, but remains aloof as he plays his piano, much to her disappointment ("Schroeder").

Schroeder walks around in the sun, happy with all the peace and quiet. However, that is soon interrupted by Lucy screaming for a ball. Snoopy lies on top of his doghouse, daydreaming about all the children adoring him until birds start to poke his stomach; he then begins to daydream about being a wild jungle beast. He soon realizes his fear of heights in this fantasy and returns to his peaceful state ("Snoopy").

Linus enters, holding his blanket and sucking his thumb. Lucy and Patty show up and mock him for this habit. Lucy tries to pull away the blanket, but fails. Linus decides to abandon his blanket and move on, only to come running back to it in desperation. After the girls leave, Linus decides to relax with his blanket until he can outgrow it ("My Blanket and Me"). Charlie Brown tries to get his unusually stubborn kite to soar in the air. Eventually, he succeeds in doing this, and he enjoys a few minutes of triumph before the kite plummets to the ground ("The Kite").

Charlie Brown tries to find the right way to give his perennial crush, the Little Red-Haired Girl, her Valentine's Day card, but he ends up saying "Merry Christmas", making a fool out of himself. He finds Patty handing out valentines, and she drops a valentine with the initials C.B. Charlie Brown gives it back to Patty, but soon learns it was Craig Bowerman's valentine. He goes to see Lucy, who is at her psychiatrist booth. He tells her all the things he thinks of himself. Lucy then clears it up by saying that Charlie Brown is unique the way he is, then asks for the five cent price ("The Doctor Is In").

Lucy comes up to Schroeder again and talks about if they got married, and potentially having to survive poverty, annoying Schroeder yet again. Linus, Lucy, Schroeder, and Charlie Brown work on their Peter Rabbit book reports, each in his or her own way. Lucy simply rambles to fit the 100-word minimum requirement; Schroeder tries comparing the book to Robin Hood and ends up making his report mostly about the latter; Linus writes an overcomplicated psychological analysis, and Charlie Brown procrastinates out of panic ("The Book Report").

Act II

Snoopy, in his World War I flying ace uniform, climbs atop his doghouse and imagines himself as a pilot searching for the Red Baron. He is defeated by the Red Baron and returns to the aerodrome in France ("The Red Baron"). Charlie Brown describes to his pen pal the events of a recent baseball game, where after various mishaps they nearly won the game, only for him to strike out and lose ("T-E-A-M (The Baseball Game)").

Linus and Lucy arrive home. Linus starts to watch TV, but Lucy tells him to switch channels. Lucy tells Linus that when she grows up, she will become a queen. Linus denies, and Lucy decides to cultivate her life for her "natural beauty" ("Queen Lucy"). The next day, at lunchtime, Charlie Brown talks about his bad days. He then notices the Little Red-Haired Girl approaching and puts a paper bag over his head. It turns out it is Lucy and Patty, chatting together.

The friends for Schroeder's Glee Club and sing "Home on the Range". Unfortunately, a fight ensues between Lucy and Linus over a pencil, eventually leading to everyone except Schroeder and Snoopy becoming fed up and leaving ("Glee Club Rehearsal"). Later, Charlie Brown comes across Lucy teaching Linus about nature the way she views it, with "facts" such as bugs pulling the grass to make it grow or snow coming out of the ground in winter. Charlie Brown tries to correct her, but she retaliates with a false explanation, and Charlie Brown bangs his head against a tree in frustration ("Little Known Facts").

The next morning, Snoopy is puzzled why he has his supper in his red dish and water in his blue dish. While walking to school, Schroeder asks if Linus filled out the form that Ms. Othmar gave them. Linus puts down “Dr. Seuss“. Snoopy talks about how he hates cats, but he is also scared of them ("Peanuts Potpourri"). That evening, Snoopy complains that he hasn't been fed yet, and begins to overly complicate and dramatize the matter until Charlie Brown shows up with his dinner. Snoopy bursts into song about his craving for supper until Charlie Brown firmly tells him to eat his meal ("Suppertime").

That night, everyone looks at the stars in wonder. The next day, Charlie Brown discovers a pencil which has been dropped by the Little Red-Haired Girl. As he examines it, he discovers that it has teeth-marks and is overjoyed to learn that she is "human". As Charlie Brown expresses in song what makes him happy, everyone, touched by his love of life, begin to express what makes them happy as well ("Happiness"). Right then, he realizes being a "good man" means trying one's best and making the most of the things given in life. As his other friends leave the stage, Lucy turns to him and tells him one last time, "You're a good man, Charlie Brown."

=== Revised ===
The revised edition is mostly similar to the original, although Patty is replaced with Charlie Brown's younger sister Sally.

Act I

Charlie Brown's friends provide exposition and express their various opinions of him ("Opening"). As Charlie Brown heads to school, he takes in his friends referring to him as a "good man" and ponders what this really means ("You're a Good Man, Charlie Brown"). Alone one day, during lunch, Charlie Brown talks about his bad days. He then notices the Little Red-Haired Girl, his perennial crush, and decides to go sit with her. However, he cannot find the courage to do so, and puts a paper bag over his head. Lucy and Sally walk by and draw a dress on the paper bag. Charlie Brown eventually takes it off and bemoans his lack of confidence ("You're a Good Man, Charlie Brown" (reprise)). Lucy expresses her deep infatuation with Schroeder and asks him what he thinks of the idea of marriage. Schroeder ignores her, focusing on playing his piano ("Schroeder"). Sally is sad because her jump rope became entangled.

Snoopy lies on top of his doghouse, relaxing vacantly and peacefully. He begins to daydream about being a wild jungle beast when several birds poke at his stomach. This fantasy is interrupted by his fear of heights, and he returns to his peaceful state ("Snoopy"). Linus enters, holding his blanket and sucking his thumb. Lucy and Sally show up and mock him for this habit. Linus decides to abandon his blanket and move on, only to come running back to it in desperation. After the girls leave, Linus daydreams of a blanket fantasy where everyone can relax with their blankets ("My Blanket and Me"). Lucy later tells him that she would someday like to be a queen ("Queen Lucy"). However, Linus tells her that she can't and she threatens to punch him. Sally gets a C for her low-quality coat-hanger sculpture, but she questions how the teacher can grade art when its quality is subjective.

Charlie Brown tries to fly his kite and experiences a brief few minutes of triumph before it is eaten by the notorious Kite-Eating Tree ("The Kite"). Later, Charlie Brown tries to find the right way to give Lucy a Valentine's Day card, but he ends up saying "Merry Christmas", making a fool out of himself. He later learns that no one sent him a card, whereas everyone else, including Snoopy, got several. He goes to see Lucy, who is at her psychiatrist booth. He tells her all the things he thinks of himself. Lucy cheers him up by assuring him he is unique the way he is, then asks for the five cent price ("The Doctor Is In"). Schroeder spreads the word of Beethoven's birthday and pulls together a celebration ("Beethoven Day").

Sally wakes up Snoopy to go rabbit chasing, and they go into strange places, like the Sahara. Linus, Lucy, Schroeder, and Charlie Brown work on their Peter Rabbit book reports, each in his or her own way. Lucy simply rambles to fit the 100-word minimum requirement; Schroeder tries comparing the book to Robin Hood and ends up making his report mostly about the latter; Linus writes an overcomplicated psychological analysis, and Charlie Brown procrastinates out of panic, while Sally and Snoopy continue chasing rabbits ("The Book Report").

Act II

Snoopy, in his World War I flying ace uniform, climbs atop his doghouse and imagines himself as a pilot searching for the Red Baron. He is defeated by the Red Baron and returns to the aerodrome in France ("The Red Baron").

Sally, upset about a D her teacher gave her on her homework assignment, comes up with various new "philosophies", ignoring Schroeder's attempts to explain how philosophies actually work ("My New Philosophy"). Charlie Brown describes to his pen pal the events of a recent baseball game, where after various mishaps they nearly won the game, only for him to strike out and lose ("T-E-A-M (The Baseball Game)"). After Schroeder tells her she is a very crabby person, Lucy takes a crabbiness survey of all her friends to determine her crabbiness: Charlie Brown gives a waffling answer, while Sally is more definitive. Upon asking Linus, he refuses to answer until she promises not to punch him; when he gives her a score of ninety-five, though, she punches him anyway. After tallying the score, she realizes that she, in reality, is really very crabby and becomes depressed. Linus cheers her up by reminding her she has a little brother who loves her.

The friends gather for Schroeder's Glee Club and sing "Home on the Range". Unfortunately, a fight ensues between Lucy and Linus over a pencil, eventually leading to everyone except Schroeder and Snoopy becoming fed up and leaving ("Glee Club Rehearsal"). Charlie Brown comes across Lucy teaching Linus about nature the way she views it, with "facts" such as bugs pulling the grass to make it grow or snow growing out of the ground in winter. Charlie Brown tries to correct her, but she retaliates with a false explanation, and Charlie Brown bangs his head against a tree in frustration ("Little Known Facts"). Snoopy complains that he hasn't been fed yet, and begins to overly complicate and dramatize the matter until Charlie Brown shows up with his dinner. Snoopy bursts into song about his craving for supper until Charlie Brown firmly tells him to eat his meal ("Suppertime").

Charlie Brown discovers a pencil which has been dropped by the Little Red-Haired Girl. As he examines it, he discovers that it has teeth-marks and is overjoyed to learn that she is "human". As Charlie Brown expresses in song what makes him happy, everyone, touched by his love of life, begin to express what makes them happy as well ("Happiness"). He realizes being a "good man" means trying one's best and making the most of the things given in life. As his other friends leave the stage, Lucy turns to him, shakes his hand, and tells him one last time, "You're a good man, Charlie Brown."

A medley of "Happiness" and "You're a Good Man, Charlie Brown" is performed as the cast comes out for a final curtain call.

== Musical numbers ==
Original

Act I

- "Opening" – Company
- "You're a Good Man, Charlie Brown" – Company
- "Schroeder" – Lucy (sung over Beethoven's "Moonlight Sonata")
- "Snoopy" – Snoopy
- "My Blanket and Me" – Linus
- "The Kite" – Charlie Brown
- "The Doctor is In" (Dr. Lucy) – Lucy and Charlie Brown
- "The Book Report" – Company

Act II

- "Opening, Pt. 2" - Company
- "T-E-A-M (The Baseball Game)" – Charlie Brown and Company
- "The Red Baron" – Snoopy
- "Queen Lucy" – Lucy and Linus
- "Glee Club Rehearsal" – Company (sung over "Home on the Range")
- "Little Known Facts" – Lucy with Linus and Charlie Brown
- "Peanuts Potpourri" – Snoopy, Schroeder, and Linus
- "Suppertime" – Snoopy
- "Happiness" – Company
- Bows – Company (includes a reprise of "You're a Good Man, Charlie Brown")

Note: "Opening, Pt. 2", "Glee Club Rehearsal", and "Bows" was not included in the original cast recording.

Revised

Act I

- "Opening" – Company
- "You're a Good Man, Charlie Brown" – Company
- "You're a Good Man, Charlie Brown" (reprise) – Charlie Brown, Linus, and Sally
- "Schroeder" – Lucy (sung over Beethoven's "Moonlight Sonata")
- "Snoopy" – Snoopy
- "My Blanket and Me" – Linus and Company
- "Queen Lucy" – Lucy and Linus
- "The Kite" – Charlie Brown (optional company background)
- "The Doctor is In" (Dr. Lucy) – Lucy and Charlie Brown
- "Peanuts Potpourri" – Sally, Linus, Snoopy, Lucy, and Schroeder
- "Beethoven Day" – Schroeder and Company
- "Rabbit Chasing" - Sally and Snoopy
- "The Book Report" – Company

Act II

- "The Red Baron" – Snoopy
- "My New Philosophy" – Sally and Schroeder
- "T-E-A-M (The Baseball Game)" – Charlie Brown and Company
- "Glee Club Rehearsal" – Company (sung over "Home on the Range")
- "Little Known Facts" – Lucy with Linus and Charlie Brown
- "Suppertime" – Snoopy
- "Happiness" – Company
- Bows – Company (includes a partial reprise of "Happiness," and "You're a Good Man, Charlie Brown")

Note: The three new songs added to the show ("Beethoven Day", "Rabbit Chasing", and "My New Philosophy") are by Andrew Lippa. "You're a Good Man, Charlie Brown Reprise", "Queen Lucy", "Peanuts Potpourri", "Rabbit Chasing", and "The Red Baron" are not included in the 1999 revival Broadway cast recording.

== Instrumentation ==
The instrumentation varies greatly and three kinds exist.

In the original Off-Broadway production, the instrumentation was simply a piano (doubling on toy piano and melodica), a bass, and percussion. It can be heard on the original cast recording.

When Tams-Witmark acquired the rights to Charlie Brown, the orchestration was rewritten from the original version. The complete orchestration contained a piano, bass, guitar, percussion, five woodwind parts, two trumpets, horn, trombone, and strings. The piano player can also be doubled on celeste, toy piano, and melodica; the first woodwind plays flute and piccolo; the second is the second flute part; the third and fourth are the first and second clarinet parts respectively; the fifth on bass clarinet and tenor sax. Any guitar, horn, and string parts (excluding bass) were all optional.

When Charlie Brown was brought back to Broadway in 1999, the orchestration was deeply revised, containing a five-piece orchestra that consisted of a piano, bass, percussion, a woodwind player, and a violinist. The piano player can double on keyboard synthesizer and kazoo; the bass player doubles on electric and acoustic bass, tenor recorder, and kazoo (in the original Broadway pit the bass player also doubled on acoustic and electric guitar); the woodwind part doubles on piccolo, flute, clarinet, soprano and alto sax, soprano recorder, and kazoo; the violin part also doubles on viola, alto recorder, kazoo, and tambourine. The percussionist primarily plays drum set but doubles on vibraphone, bells, triangle, timpani, and xylophone, with the parts intended to be played with a synthesizer. This version is also available through Tams-Witmark.

== Casts ==
Character	Concept Album (1966)	Off-Broadway (1967)	Toronto and West End (1967/1968)	First US tour (1968)	Second US tour (1969)	Third US tour (1970)	Broadway (1971)	TV special (1973)	Fourth US tour and Broadway revival (1998/1999)	Off-Broadway revival (2016)
Charlie Brown	Orson Bean	Gary Burghoff	David Rhys-Anderson	Ken Kube	Alan Lofft	Richard Whelan	Dean Stolber	Wendell Burton	Anthony Rapp	Joshua Colley
Lucy van Pelt	Barbara Minkus	Reva Rose	Boni Enten	Ann Gibbs	Minnie Gaster	Cathy Wallace	Liz O'Neal	Ruby Persson	Ilana Levine	Mavis Simpson-Ernst
Linus van Pelt	Clark Gesner	Bob Balaban	Gene Kidwell	Joel Kimmel	Derek McGrath	Vic Vail	Stephen Fenning	Barry Livingston	BD Wong	Jeremy T. Villas
Patty	N/A	Karen Johnson	Courtney Lane	Linda Sherwood	Marylu Moyer	Marylu Moyer	Lee Wilson	Noelle Matlovsky	—N/a	—N/a
Sally Brown	—N/a	—N/a	—N/a	—N/a	—N/a	—N/a	—N/a	—N/a	Kristin Chenoweth	Milly Shapiro
Schroeder	N/A	Skip Hinnant	Gene Scandur	Jonathan Hadary	Dennis Phillips	Dennis Phillips	Carter Cole	Mark Montgomery	Stanley Wayne Mathis	Gregory Diaz
Snoopy	Bill Hinnant	Bill Hinnant	Don Potter	T. D. Johnston	Grant Cowan	Grant Cowan	Grant Cowan	Bill Hinnant	Roger Bart	Aidan Gemme

Notes: The character of "Sally" was added in the 1999 revival, replacing "Patty" from the original version. Sally was then used for the 2016 revival as well.
The characters of Patty and Schroeder do not appear on the concept album.

Articles about the 1999 revision while it was in previews noted that the one difference between the original production and the 1999 version was that the latter reflected the increased ethnic diversity of casting over the decades that had passed, with Schroeder being played by an African American actor (Mathis) and Linus by an Asian American (Wong).

== Response ==
The off-Broadway production was well received, with The Village Voice praising the simplistic set and "strikingly talented" cast. Walter Kerr in The New York Times called the show "a miracle", saying, "Almost everything works, because almost everything is effortless."

In reviewing the 1999 revival, Playbill's Steven Suskin found it "overblown and underwhelming. The scenic and musical enhancements were especially harmful, it seemed to me; the unassuming, child-size characters were overwhelmed… Which is not to say that the 1999 music department did a bad job; it's simply that the concept of a big, new 'You're a Good Man, Charlie Brown' worked against the inherent qualities of the material." In The New York Times, Ben Brantley wrote a lukewarm review:

The real problem is a matter of scale… there's an uncomfortable feeling of dead air that the cast must work much too hard to fill… Songs that were created as droll, low-key character portraits have been reconceived as showstoppers, and the frail, winsome little bodies of these numbers just aren't up to the job. When Linus sings a duet with his famous security blanket, which has been wired to dance on its own, the sequence has a flailing, improvised quality that is the stuff of actors' nightmares.

Brantley did praise some of the cast, saying, "Kristin Chenoweth's performance as Sally will be the part that should seal her reputation. This glow cast by a star-in-the-making gives a real Broadway magic to a show that otherwise feels sadly shrunken… And Roger Bart, in the plum role of Snoopy, the charismatic beagle, incorporates some delightful doglike mannerisms."

== Awards and nominations ==
=== Original Off-Broadway Production ===
Year	Award Ceremony	Category	Nominee	Result
1967	Drama Desk Award	Best Performer	Bill Hinnant	Won
1967	Drama Desk Award	Outstanding Director of a Musical	Joseph Hardy	Won
1967	Outer Critics Circle Award	Outstanding Off-Broadway Musical		Won
1967	Theatre World Award		Reva Rose	Won
1967	Clarence Derwent Award	Most Promising Female	Reva Rose	Won
1968	Grammy Award	Best Musical Show Album		Nominated

=== 1999 Broadway Revival ===
Year	Award Ceremony	Category	Nominee	Result
1999	Tony Award	Best Revival of a Musical		Nominated
1999	Tony Award	Best Featured Actor in a Musical	Roger Bart	Won
1999	Tony Award	Best Featured Actress in a Musical	Kristin Chenoweth	Won
1999	Tony Award	Best Direction of a Musical	Michael Mayer	Nominated
1999	Drama Desk Award	Outstanding Revival of a Musical		Won
1999	Drama Desk Award	Outstanding Featured Actor in a Musical	Roger Bart	Won
1999	Drama Desk Award	Outstanding Featured Actress in a Musical	Kristin Chenoweth	Won
1999	Drama Desk Award	Outstanding Director of a Musical	Michael Mayer	Nominated
1999	Drama Desk Award	Outstanding Set Design	David Gallo	Nominated
2000	Grammy Award	Best Musical Show Album		Nominated

== Adaptations ==
In 1973, the show was adapted for television in a Hallmark Hall of Fame TV special, broadcast on NBC. Actors featured in the adaptation included original 1967 cast member Bill Hinnant as Snoopy. Hinnant was the only member of the original off-Broadway cast to reprise their role in the special.

CBS aired a new prime-time animated TV special in 1985, based on the original musical. This version was the first animated depiction of Snoopy with comprehensible dialogue, voiced by Robert Towers, who previously portrayed the role in the 1967 Los Angeles production alongside Burghoff as Charlie Brown and Judy Kaye as Lucy.

Original cast albums have been released for all three versions of the stage show, however the 1973 Hallmark Hall of Fame recording on Atlantic Records is no longer in print.

== See also ==
- Dog Sees God: Confessions of a Teenage Blockhead
- Snoopy! The Musical
