= Little Known Facts =

"Little Known Facts" is a musical number in the Broadway musical comedy, You're a Good Man, Charlie Brown. The music and lyrics were written by Clark Gesner in 1966. The song was in the original Off-Broadway production of the show in 1967 and was also in the revival production in 1999, where it contained an extra stanza by Andrew Lippa.

== Basis ==
The song is based on several Peanuts comic strips written by Charles M. Schulz. The strips show Lucy van Pelt teaching her younger brother, Linus van Pelt childish facts, that are of course, false.

== Plot ==
During the scene of the show, the music begins as Charlie Brown is center stage as Linus and Lucy enter. Charlie Brown questions their doing, Linus replies that Lucy feels that as an older sister, she is responsible to teach Linus facts about nature. Linus finds Lucy very intelligent, for he is not aware the facts are incorrect. After each of most of Lucy's teachings, Linus agrees with Lucy and Charlie Brown tries to tell Lucy what she's telling Linus is not true. After Lucy explains about snow coming up, Charlie Brown objects, but then Lucy adds that when the snow comes up, it is blown around by wind, so it looks like it comes down. Charlie Brown, exasperated, exclaims "Oh good grief!", storms off and bangs his head on a tree, which Linus questions. Lucy explains about the bark, and, only in the revival, sings the ending line.

== False facts ==
Throughout the number, Lucy teaches Linus the following facts:

- Fir trees produce animal fur to be made into coats. During winter, they produce wool.
- Elm trees grow into oak trees as they get older and larger. You can also determine a young elm tree's age by counting its leaves.
- Clouds are the cause of blowing wind.
- The way grass grows involves insects tugging seedlings to the point that they grow to their adult state.
- A fire hydrant is like a plant and for reasons unknown, give off tremendous amounts of water.
- Lucy points to Woodstock says that it is an eagle but since it is still little, it is called a sparrow. Also, humans consume eagles as a meal for Christmas and Thanksgiving.
- Galactic forms, such as stars and planets are the cause of rain.
- Snow comes up out of the ground like grass and the wind blows it around to make it look like it's falling.
- If someone bangs their head on a tree, it is to loosen the bark for the tree to grow faster.
