= The Utter Glory of Morrissey Hall =

1979 musical by Clark Gesner and Nagle Jackson

- Music: Clark Gesner
- Lyrics: Clark Gesner
- Book: Clark Gesner; Nagle Jackson
- Productions: 1979 Broadway

The Utter Glory of Morrissey Hall is a musical with music and lyrics by Clark Gesner and a book by Gesner and Nagle Jackson. The production opened and closed on May 13, 1979 at the Mark Hellinger Theatre on Broadway after only seven previews and one regular performance.

== Synopsis ==
Act I

Morrissey Hall is a girls' school in England. The day has hardly begun when Headmistress Julia Faysle reads in an unflattering remark about the quality of girls produced by her school. The Sixth Form mistake her subsequent concern for their health and grooming as being a sign that they are all about to be sold into slavery. The Fifth Form, in turn, find the Sixth's newest behaviour very strange and prepare their own defenses. The headmistress' secretary, Elizabeth Wilkins, attempts to convey to the audience that she is indeed not any part of this madhouse, then returns to her duties. Meanwhile, the headmistress and her faculty chum, Foresta Studley, get carried away with jolly memories of their own girlhood at Morrissey Hall.

A letter arrives. It is for Helen Wells-Morton, from her boyfriend, Charles. The letter contains a key, and when a trunk arrives for Helen, Headmistress Faysle uses all her wiles to try to get the key so she can open and inspect the trunk. When it is finally opened, Charles leaps out and escapes to the upper reaches of the school. Early on in all this, a salesman, Richard Tidewell, has arrived to see the Headmistress. He has waited patiently in the outer office with Elizabeth for most of the Act, but now he must go. It is revealed that he and Elizabeth have fallen in love.

Act II

The Fifth Form, in a history competition, has won a Bumper Car ride, and the huge amusement park contraption is now set on the campus. The school loves the ride, but retaliation is obviously demanded. While Mrs. Delmonde rehearses a St. George and the Dragon pageant, the Bumper Car is attacked. It is obviously the beginning of the end. Miss Winkle, faculty leader of the Fifth Form and now drunk with power as commander of the Bumper Car, whips them around in the ride.

It has obviously been too much for the headmistress. She has, since the beginning of the Act, been sequestered in her office, seeing nobody, and having a lovely, quiet time pressing flowers and arranging them in an album. She is at peace. Helen, too, has found her dear if slightly reluctant Charles, and even manages to get him to sing with her on matters of the heart. But it is all too late. The Fifth and Sixth have been arming themselves from mail order catalogues, and even the Headmistress' perennial optimism seems tentative to say the least, just prior to the outbreak of full scale, all-school, hell-bent-for-leather war.

Soon, however, life at Morrisey Hall has gone back to normal. The Sixth Form graduates and life goes on. And that does seem to be the glory of such a place: that in spite of everything—the heartrending, overwhelming odds—they do, always and ever, go on.

== Musical numbers ==
Act I

- Overture - Orchestra
- Promenade - Company
- Proud, Erstwhile, Upright, Fair - Julia Faysle, Foresta Studley, Elizabeth Wilkins
- Elizabeth's Song - Elizabeth Wilkins
- Way Back When - Julia Faysle, Foresta Studley
- Lost - The Sixth Form
- Morning - Mrs. Delmonde, Dancing Class
- The Letter - Helen, Charles Hill, Company
- Give Me That Key - Julia Faysle, Helen, Elizabeth Wilkins
- Duet - Elizabeth Wilkins, Richard Tidewell, Company

Act II

- Interlude and Gallop - Orchestra, Students
- Oh Sun - Marjorie (St. George), Angela (Dragon), Helen, Frances, Mary (Dryads), Mrs. Delmonde
- You Will Know When the Time Has Arrived - Teresa Winkle, Carswell, Fifth and Sixth Forms
- You Would Say - Helen, Charles Hill, Fifth Form
- See the Blue - Julia Faysle, Flowers (Girls)
- Dance of Resignation - Mrs. Delmonde
- Reflection - Julia Faysle
- The War (Les Preludes by Franz Liszt) - Company
- Oh, Sun (reprise)/The Ending - Company

== Characters ==
Administration:

- Julia Faysle, Headmistress of Morrissey Hall
- Elizabeth Wilkins, Secretary

Staff:

- Foresta Studley
- Teresa Winkle
- Mrs. Delmonde
- Miss Newton
- Mr. Weybum, Groundskeeper

Sixth Form Students:

- Carswell
- Vickers
- Boody
- Dale
- Dickerson
- Haverfield

Fifth Form Students:

- Alice
- Helen
- Frances
- Angela
- Marjorie
- Mary

Visitors:

- Richard Tidewell
- Charles Hill
- Mr. Osgood

== Production history ==
The production had a well received engagement at the Pacific Conservatory of the Performing Arts in 1976, starring Jill Tanner as Headmistress Julia Faysle. Following a 1977 production at McCarter Theatre in 1977, Morrissey Hall began previews on Broadway at the Mark Hellinger Theatre on May 3, 1979. However, the show closed on opening night, May 13, 1979. Cast members included Celeste Holm as Julia Faysle and Taina Elg as Mrs. Delmonde. After the show closed, an original cast recording, featuring most of the show's musical numbers, was released. The creative team included direction by Jackson, lighting by Howard Bay, costumes by David Graden, and choreography by Buddy Schwab.

The show was staged again at The Lamb's Players Theatre in San Diego in 1992. Nancy Churnin of the Los Angeles Times said that "it is openly and unabashedly cartoonish", but that "nothing in the story of The Utter Glory of Morrissey Hall is new or special."
