= Mark Hellinger Theatre =

Former theater in Manhattan, New York

- Warner Bros. Hollywood Theatre (1930–1947); 51st Street Theatre (1936–1937, 1940–1941); Warner Theatre (1947–1948); Mark Hellinger Theatre (after 1948); Times Square Church (1989–present)
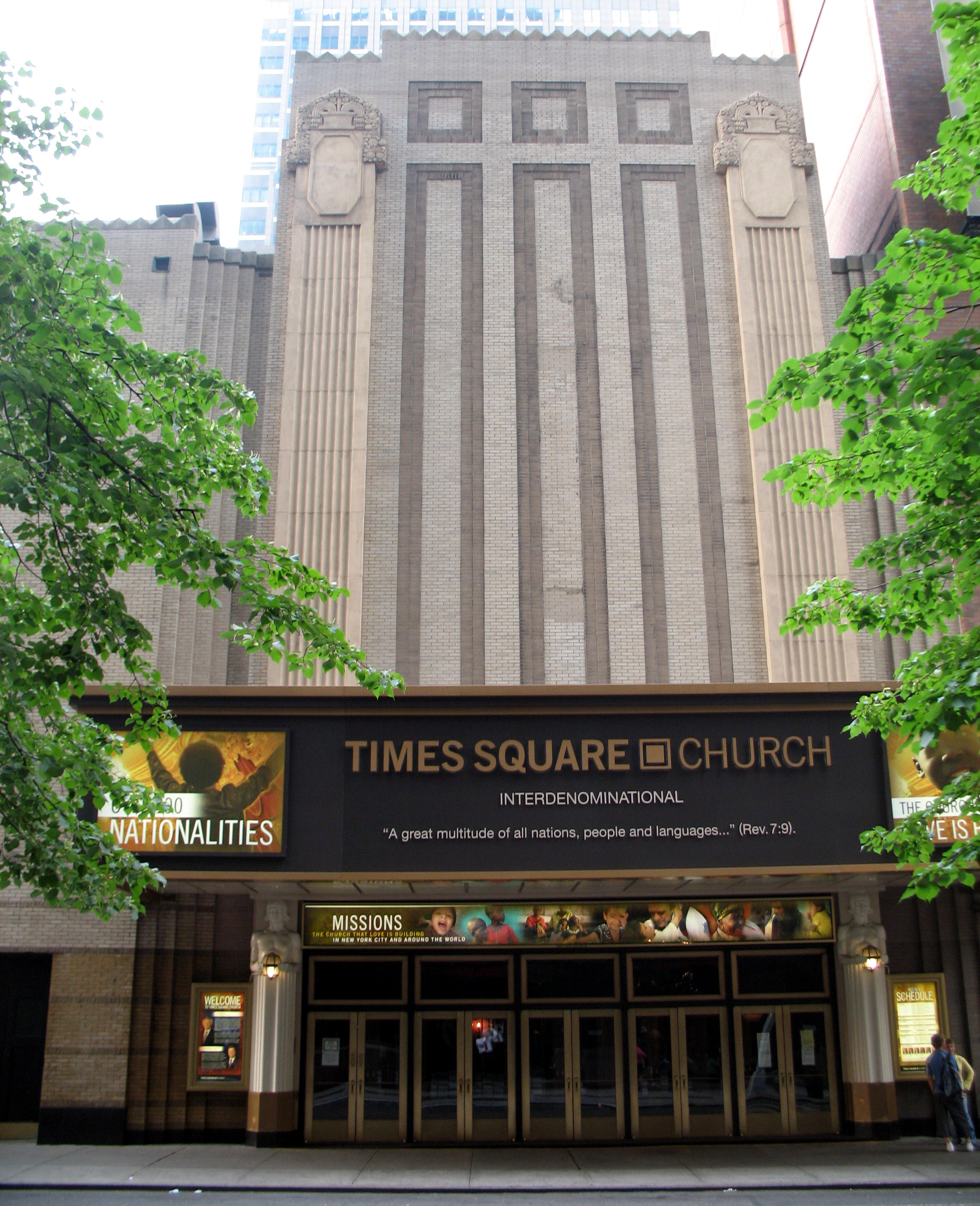
- The facade seen in June 2007
- Interactive map of Mark Hellinger Theatre
- Address: 237 West 51st Street; Manhattan, New York City; United States
- Coordinates: 40°45′45″N 73°59′03″W
- Owner: Times Square Church
- Capacity: 1,603
- Type: Church; Former Broadway theater and cinema
- Current use: Church

Construction
- Opened: April 22, 1930 (96 years ago)
- Closed: 1989 (as theater)
- Years active: 1930–1989
- Architect: Thomas W. Lamb

New York City Landmark
- Designated: January 5, 1988
- Reference no.: 1338
- Designated entity: Facade

New York City Landmark
- Designated: November 17, 1987
- Reference no.: 1339
- Designated entity: Lobby, basement lounge, and auditorium interior

The Mark Hellinger Theatre (formerly the 51st Street Theatre, Warner Theatre, and Hollywood Theatre) is a theater and church building at 237 West 51st Street in the Midtown Manhattan neighborhood of New York City, U.S. Opened in 1930, the Hellinger Theatre is named after journalist Mark Hellinger and was developed by Warner Bros. Pictures as a movie palace before later hosting Broadway productions. It was designed by Thomas W. Lamb with a 1930s–modern style facade and a Baroque interior. It has 1,603 seats across two levels and has been a house of worship for the Times Square Church since 1989. Both the exterior and interior of the theater are New York City landmarks.

The facade on 51st Street is constructed with golden and brown bricks. The stage house to the west and the auditorium at the center are designed as one unit, with a cornice above the auditorium. The eastern section, containing the building's current main entrance, includes statues flanking the doors, as well as an overhanging marquee. The 51st Street facade was originally a side entrance; the main entrance was originally at 1655 Broadway but was closed in the 1950s. The interior rotunda lobby contains eight fluted columns, a balcony, and a domed ceiling with several murals; a basement lounge exists under the lobby. The auditorium has a coved ceiling with murals, as well as boxes and a deep stage.

For the first two decades of the theater's existence, it largely served as a cinema under the Hollywood Theatre name. Vaudeville was presented in 1932, and some legitimate live-theatrical productions were shown intermittently from 1934 to 1942. The theater was briefly known as the 51st Street Theatre around 1936 and 1941 and as the Warner Theatre from 1947 to 1948. Anthony Brady Farrell bought the theater and renamed it after Hellinger, reopening it as a legitimate theater in 1949. The theater was subsequently acquired by the Stahl family in 1957 and the Nederlander Organization in 1976. The Hellinger hosted some hits from the 1950s to the 1970s, including My Fair Lady, but later productions such as Timbuktu! were mostly flops. By 1989, a lack of Broadway productions prompted the Nederlanders to lease the theater to the Times Square Church. The church's congregation, which bought the theater in 1991, continues to operate it.

== Site ==
The Mark Hellinger Theatre is at 237 West 51st Street, on the north sidewalk between Eighth Avenue and Broadway, in the Midtown Manhattan neighborhood of New York City. The irregular land lot covers 23,650 square feet (2,197 m^{2}), with a frontage of 225 feet (69 m) on 51st Street and a depth of 200 feet (61 m). The bulk of the theater exists on 51st Street, with a wing extending north to 52nd Street. The Mark Hellinger Theatre shares the block with the Neil Simon Theatre to the west and Gallagher's Steakhouse to the north. Other nearby buildings include the August Wilson Theatre to the north; the Broadway Theatre and 810 Seventh Avenue to the northeast; Axa Equitable Center to the east; the Winter Garden Theatre to the southeast; and Paramount Plaza (including the Circle in the Square Theatre and the Gershwin Theatre) to the south. An entrance to the New York City Subway's 50th Street station, serving the 1 train, is just south of the theater.

== Design ==
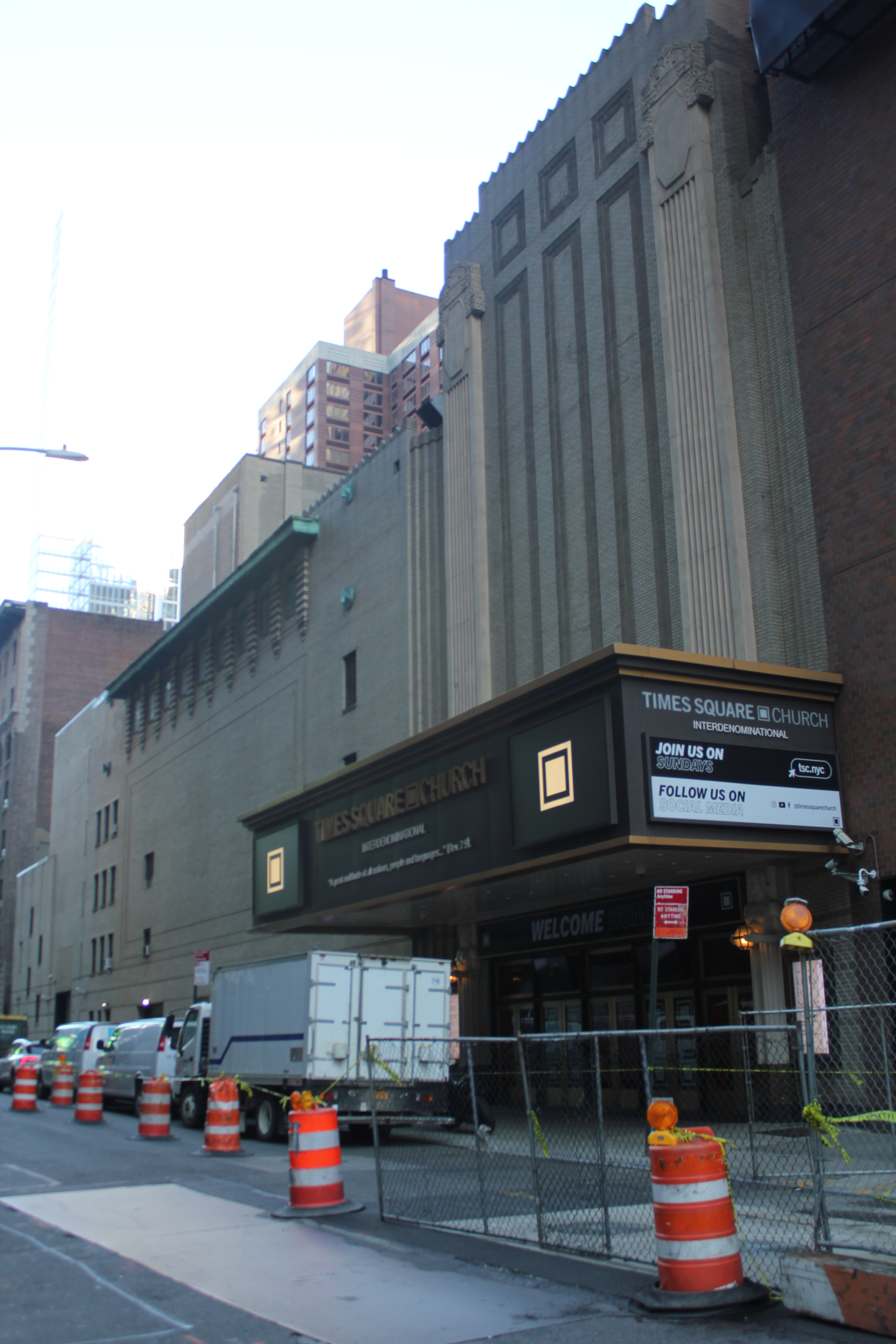
The theater's 51st Street facade as seen from the east

The Mark Hellinger Theatre, originally the Hollywood Theatre, was designed by Thomas W. Lamb and was constructed in 1930 as a movie palace for Warner Bros. While the interior was designed in a 16th-century Baroque style, the exterior was treated in a style that was contemporary for the 1930s.

=== Facade ===
==== Broadway (former) ====
The Hollywood Theatre's main entrance was originally at 1655 Broadway, with a narrow lobby leading to a grand foyer on 51st Street. (Note: William Morrison's book lists the original legal address as 1655 Broadway & 217–33 West 51st Street.) At the time of the theater's construction in 1930, cinemas that premiered films in the Times Square area typically had entrances on Broadway, regardless of the width. While the Broadway entrance was narrow, it contained a bright marquee and a huge lighted vertical sign. The Broadway entrance was closed in 1934 and converted to retail space before being demolished completely prior to the late 1990s.

The roof of the Hollywood Theatre's Broadway wing originally contained a V-shaped steel sign measuring 80 feet (24 m) tall and 210 feet (64 m) wide. Described in 1929 as "the largest electrical display in the world", the sign weighed 115 tons. A dedicated generator illuminated the sign's 20,000 bulbs, which were arranged so that 8-foot-tall (2.4 m) letters could be flashed.

==== 51st Street ====
The only surviving facade is on 51st Street and consists of two modern-style sections, both made of brick and designed with vertical motifs. The eastern section is a narrow tower containing the building's entrance. The other section, which contains the stage house and auditorium, is shorter but wider. Although the 51st Street facade serves as the building's current front entrance, this was originally a side entrance.

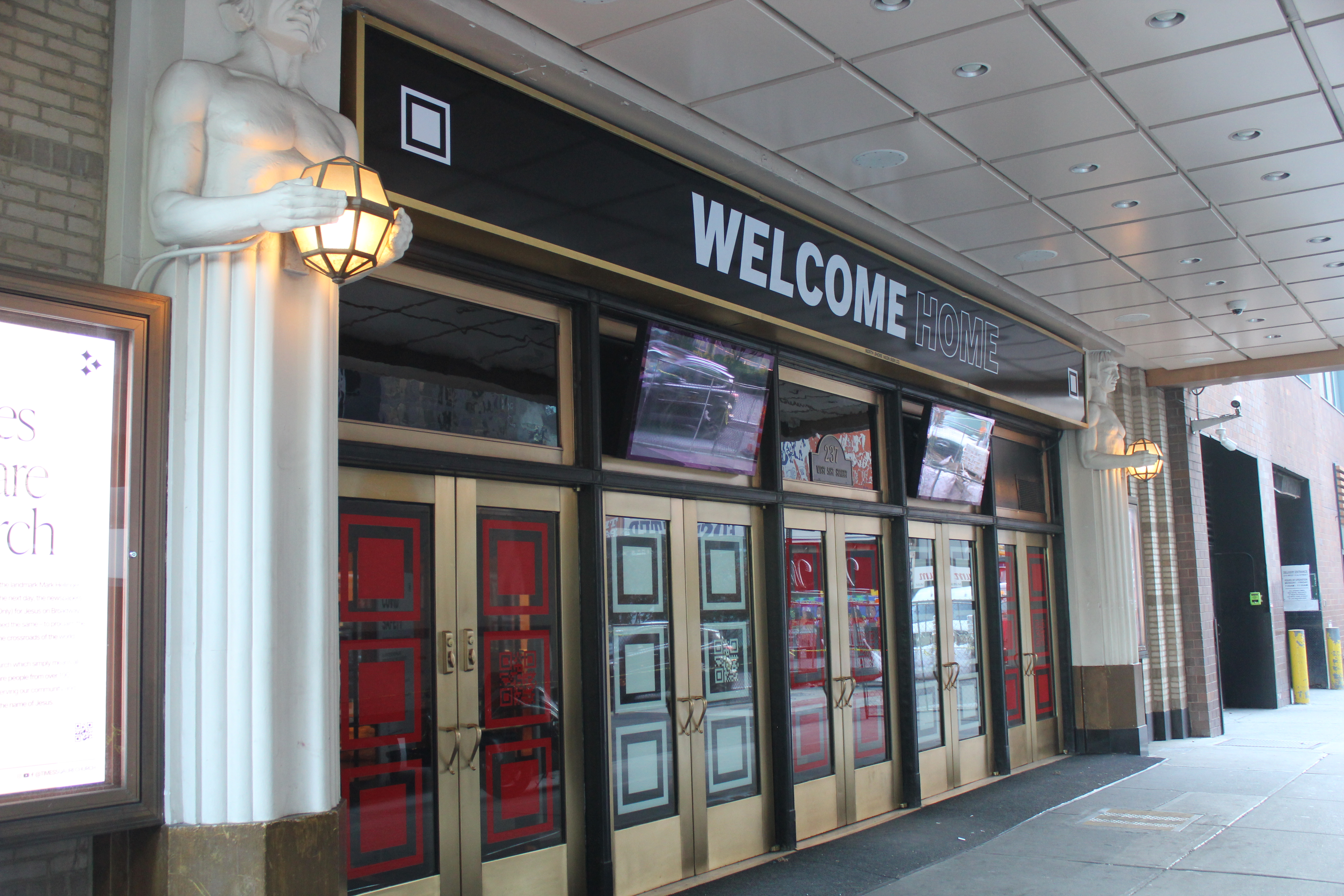
Entrance detail

The entrance section has a water table made of black granite. The entrance itself contains five double doors below transom windows, all made of glass with bronze frames. On either side are tall figures holding globe-shaped lanterns, as well as bronze display boxes. A modern marquee is mounted over the building's entrance. The facade is made of gold-colored brick, with three strips of brown-brick rectangles above the marquee, rising to a set of three brown-brick squares. On either side are fluted terracotta panels, topped by stylized urns that contain plant forms. On all stories, the theater's brick courses step outward to the left and right of the tower. The top of the entrance's facade contains a parapet with zigzag patterns.

The stage house to the west and the auditorium at the center share a facade, with gold-colored brick above a black-granite water table. Horizontal brown-brick strips run across the first story. The first floor also contains display boxes with brick headers around them, as well as an office door, a former stage door, and a wide garage door. On the upper stories, the central section (auditorium) contains a large brick panel surrounded by soldier courses. There are rectangular openings to the east (right) of this panel, with grilles above them. The top story of the auditorium contains stylized brick brackets, which support a decorative copper cornice; there are octagonal panels between the brackets. The stage house contains window openings between shallow brick piers. There is a setback on the stage house's upper stories, with plain brick behind it.

=== Interior ===
The Hellinger's rococo interior was similar to that of other 1920s movie palaces. The interior spaces were designed by Leif Neandross, chief designer of the Rambusch Decorating Company. The original decorative scheme was gold with highlights of red and blue.

==== Lobby ====
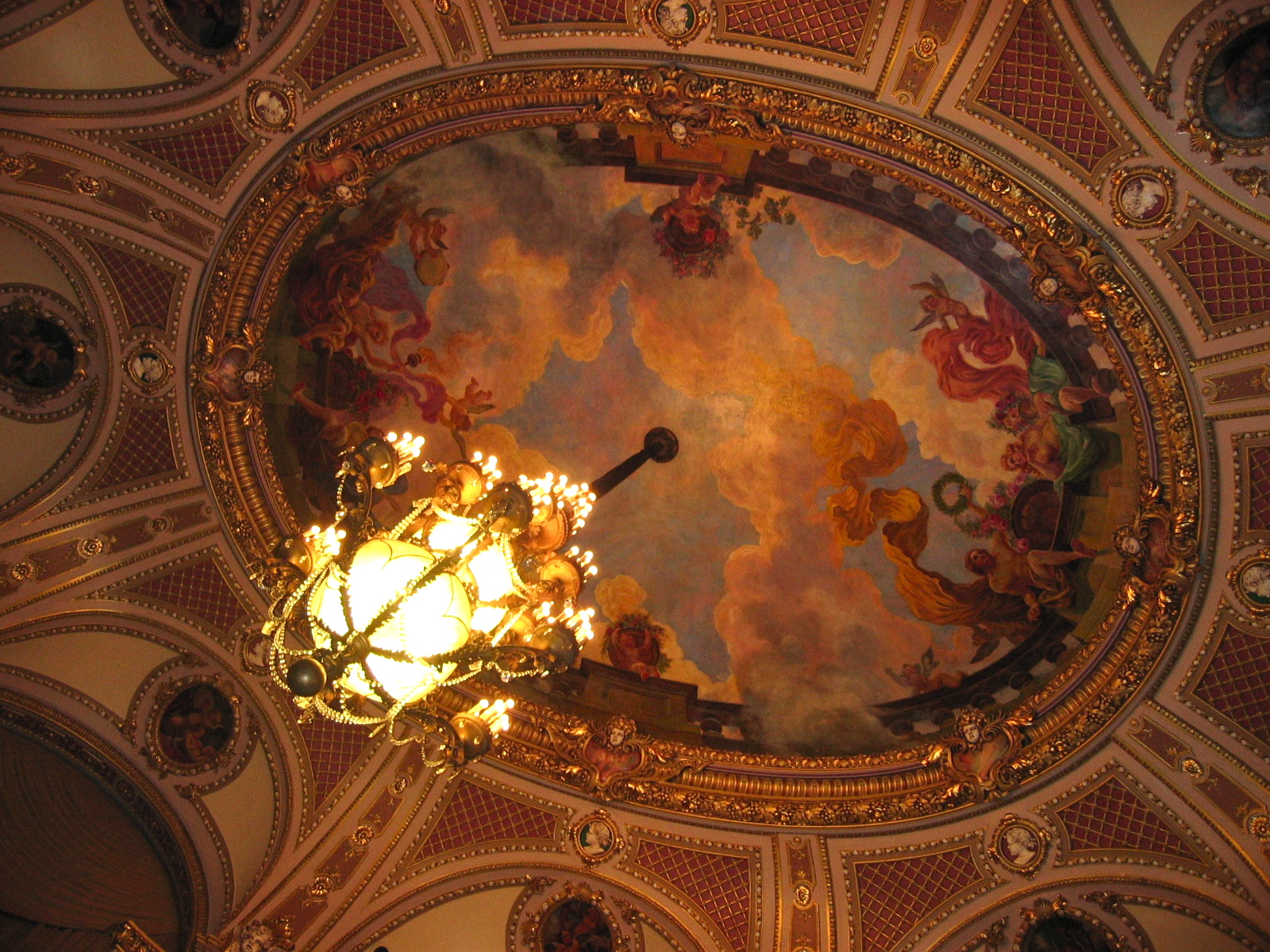
Rotunda ceiling

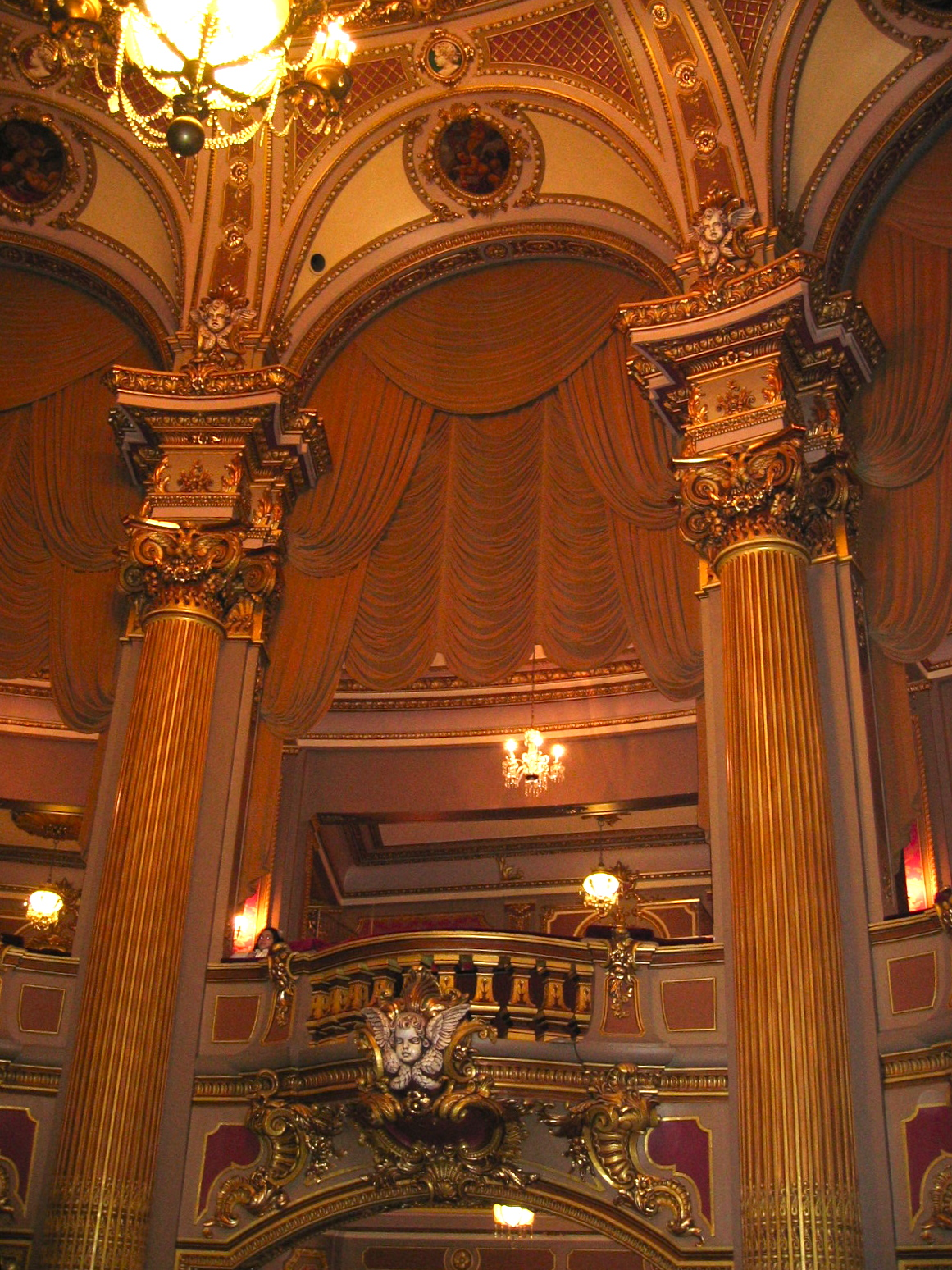
Rotunda column decorations

The original lobby from Broadway (since demolished) was designed in a modern French style. It was Art Deco in design and led to the present main lobby. According to a contemporary account, the Broadway lobby had mirrored walls with bronze and marble decorations, in addition to a plaster ceiling. The Broadway lobby was designed to potentially support a taller building that was canceled during the Great Depression.

The main lobby is a double-height oval rotunda with eight fluted columns holding up a domed ceiling. According to the New York City Landmarks Preservation Commission (LPC), the lobby's design is similar to the interior of the 18th-century Basilica of the Fourteen Holy Helpers in Germany. The Times Square Church uses the lobby to sell religious products such as books and CDs. The main lobby's columns are placed on marble pedestals, and they are topped by Ionic-style capitals. Above the columns is a marble entablature with cherubs. The ceiling has paneled arches and coves, which converge at a rope molding that surrounds the oval dome at the ceiling's center. A classical mural is painted in the middle of the ceiling; the mural was intended to symbolize arts and learning. A large multi-tiered candelabra hangs from the middle of the dome.

The lobby's walls contain marble bases, above which are panels surrounded by ornamental moldings. Lighting sconces are mounted onto the walls, and there are openings to the auditorium's orchestra level on the west wall. Doors on the south wall lead back to the ticket lobby. The north wall contains a grand staircase to a balcony at the auditorium's mezzanine level. Additional staircases connect to that level from the lobby's entrance.

The balcony overlooks the lobby. The staircases from the lobby contain wall panels with ornamental moldings as well as lighting sconces; there are also mirrors at the landings. Underneath the balcony, next to the columns on the north wall, are segmental arches that are supported by console brackets. The balcony itself has a balustrade with motifs of scallops and cherubs, while the underside of the balcony has moldings. The walls of the balcony also have panels with moldings; there are doorways decorated with cartouches and swags, which lead to lounges. Ribs divide the balcony's ceiling into panels, and there are moldings along the border of both the ribs and the panels. Candelabras and globe chandeliers are suspended from the balcony ceiling. There was originally furniture along the balcony.

==== Auditorium ====
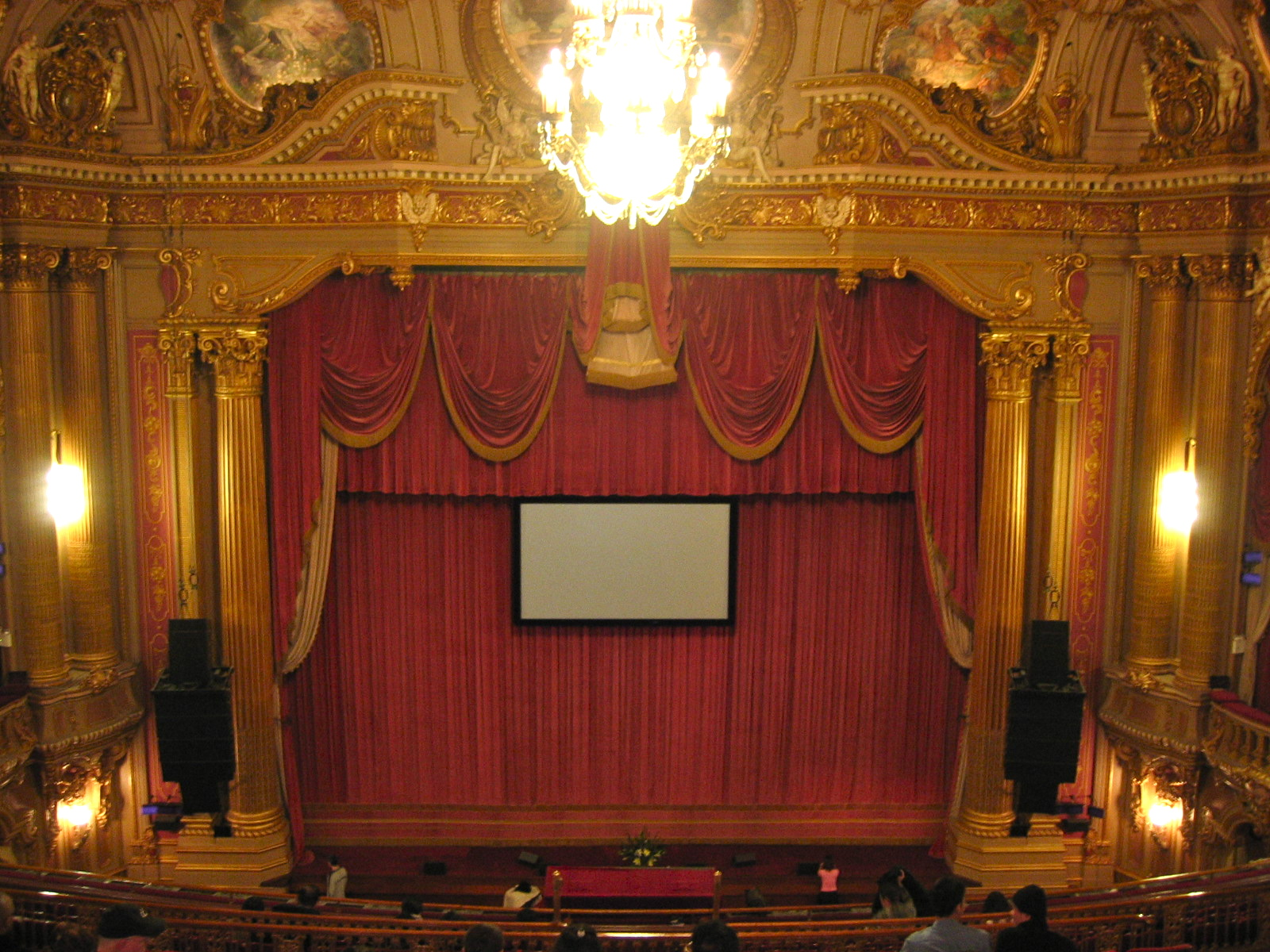
View of the proscenium from the balcony

The auditorium has an orchestra level, one balcony, boxes, and a stage behind the proscenium arch. The auditorium is slightly wider than its depth, and the space is designed with plaster decorations in low relief. The auditorium's seating capacity is 1,603, though historically it could fit 1,506 people. The orchestra alone could fit 900 people. The seats are upholstered in red velvet and finished in wood. From the outset, three hundred seats were equipped with "Warner Theatre-phones" to both amplify and clarify sound for hard-of-hearing users. Damask curtains were placed on the walls to increase insulation. The auditorium curves inward near the proscenium.

===== Seating areas =====
The rear (east) end of the orchestra contains a shallow, curving promenade. The walls of the orchestra promenade have doors, above which are exit signs with flanking volutes. Both the orchestra and the promenade contain flat pilasters on the walls, between which are panels with moldings on their borders. The orchestra is slightly raked, sloping down toward an orchestra pit near the stage.

The underside of the balcony, above the orchestra, contains globe-shaped light fixtures and three coves with scallops and foliation. Though the balcony is also raked, its underside is convex, preventing sound-deadening air pockets from accumulating at the orchestra's rear wall. The balcony also has a promenade at its rear, separated from the main balcony by decorated vertical piers. The balcony and promenade walls contain flat pilasters and panels with molded borders. The side walls contain arched doorways with molded frames. The rear wall has a standing rail and lighting sconces. The balcony level is divided into front and rear sections by a crossover aisle, which runs between metal railings on either side. The balcony's front railing has foliate motifs, which are aligned on a vertical axis. A projection room was placed at the rear of the balcony, measuring 30 feet (9.1 m) long and 12 feet (3.7 m) tall.

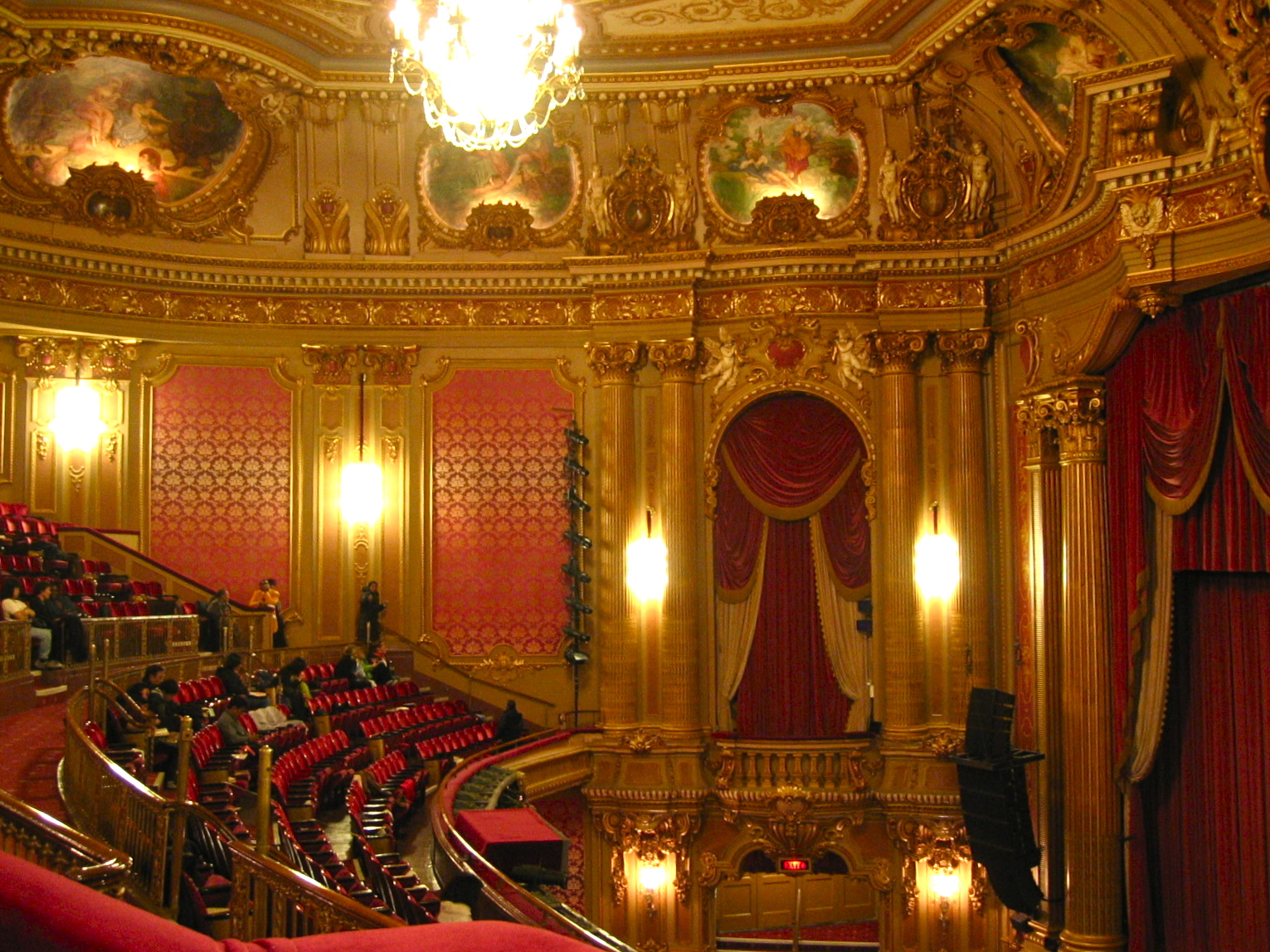
View from the right of the auditorium, looking toward the boxes and left wall

On either side of the proscenium is an archway with a single box that is curved outward. The balcony's front railing extends onto the box's front railing, supporting two fluted Corinthian columns on either side of each box. Underneath the front railing of each box is an arch at orchestra level, which contains a pair of console brackets with a cartouche at the center. There are also cartouches beside the arches, under each pair of columns; these in turn are flanked by brackets with cherubs and swags. Above each box is another arch, which rises from volutes atop the Corinthian-column pairs. Small pendant chandeliers are placed in front of the boxes' column pairs.

===== Other design features =====
Next to the boxes is an inverted proscenium arch. The proscenium arch contains Corinthian-style fluted piers and columns on either side, topped by console brackets. The top of the arch is designed as an ornate entablature. The center of the proscenium contains a large plaster-of-Paris crown, supported by a broken pediment with winged figures. The stage has a depth of 45 feet (14 m). Although the Hellinger was built as a cinema, the theater's large stage could also be used to present large musical shows.

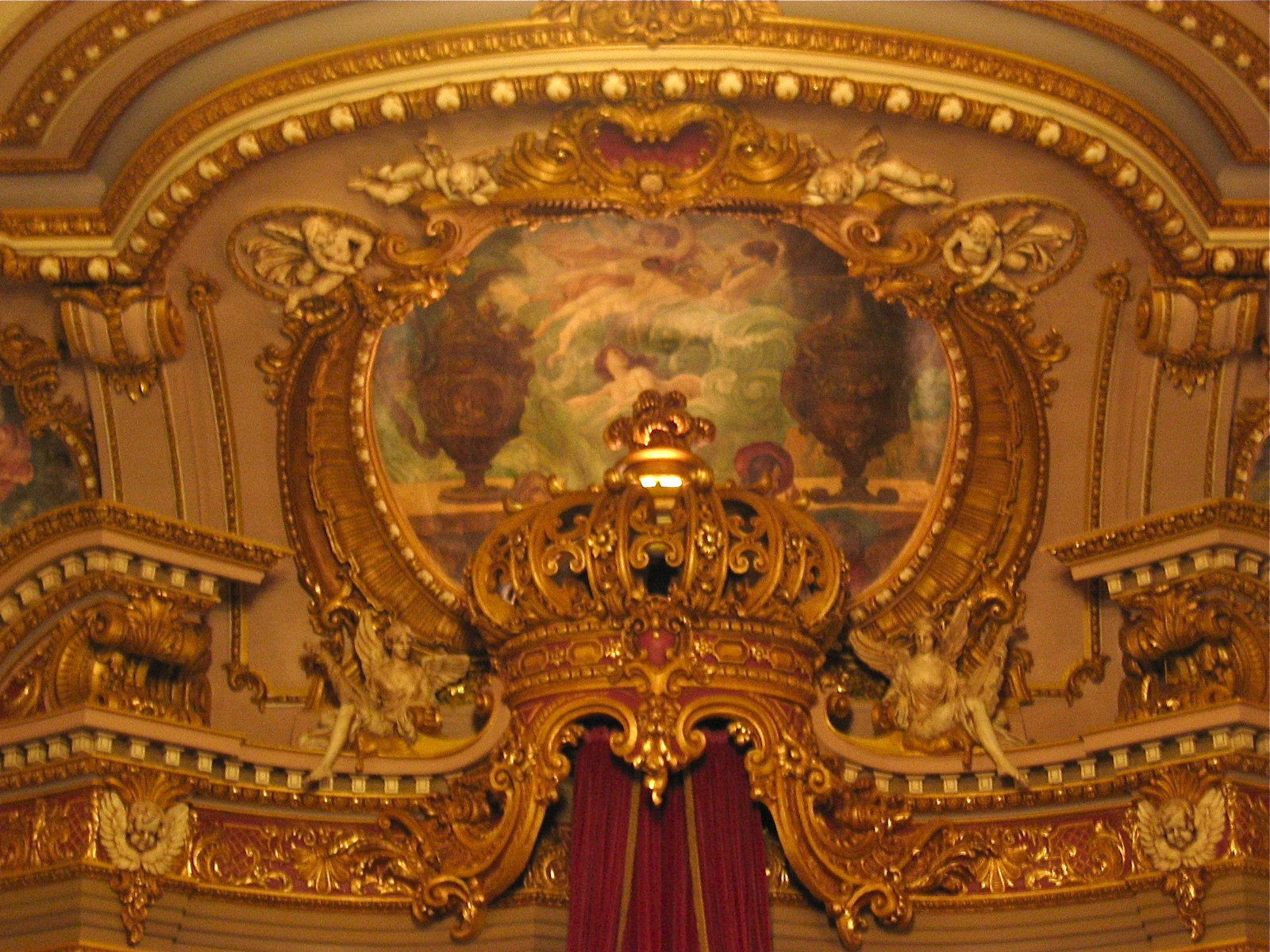
Proscenium cove

Below the ceiling, wrapping around the whole auditorium, is an entablature with a leaf molding. The edges of the ceiling are split into numerous coves, separated by console brackets with cartouches at their centers. Each of the coves contains a painted mural with a round frame and a cartouche above. There are twelve frames in total, which depict 18th-century French aristocratic scenes; each mural signifies a different part of the year. The main portion of the ceiling contains additional molded bands, which contain more murals and surround an oval panel at the center. The oval panel contains a fan design while the surrounding panels are designed in the Adam style. There are small pendant-style chandeliers hanging from the outer panels of the ceiling. A large globe-style chandelier hangs from the center of the oval panel.

==== Basement ====
Directly below the lobby is an oval basement lounge. There are eight pairs of imitation-marble columns, topped by Tuscan-style capitals. The walls contain panels with molded borders, and there are molded doorway openings with entablatures. One wall contains a fireplace, the mantelpiece of which consists of a shelf supported on console brackets. The immediate opposite wall has doorways to the women's and men's restrooms. The lounge formerly also had a bar, which was installed in the 1960s.

The ceiling dome is shallow and contains a central medallion with overlapping circles, from which hangs a large chandelier. The rest of the ceiling contains moldings and beams, which divide the ceiling into sections, each with a central medallion and a smaller globe-style chandelier. A staircase curves upward to the lobby and contains paneled walls with molded borders, as well as a paneled ceiling with suspended globe-style chandeliers.

== History ==
Movie palaces became common in the 1920s between the end of World War I and the beginning of the Great Depression. In the New York City area, only a small number of operators were involved in the construction of movie palaces. These theaters' designers included the legitimate-theater architects Thomas Lamb, C. Howard Crane, and John Eberson.

=== Hollywood Theatre ===
==== Development and opening ====
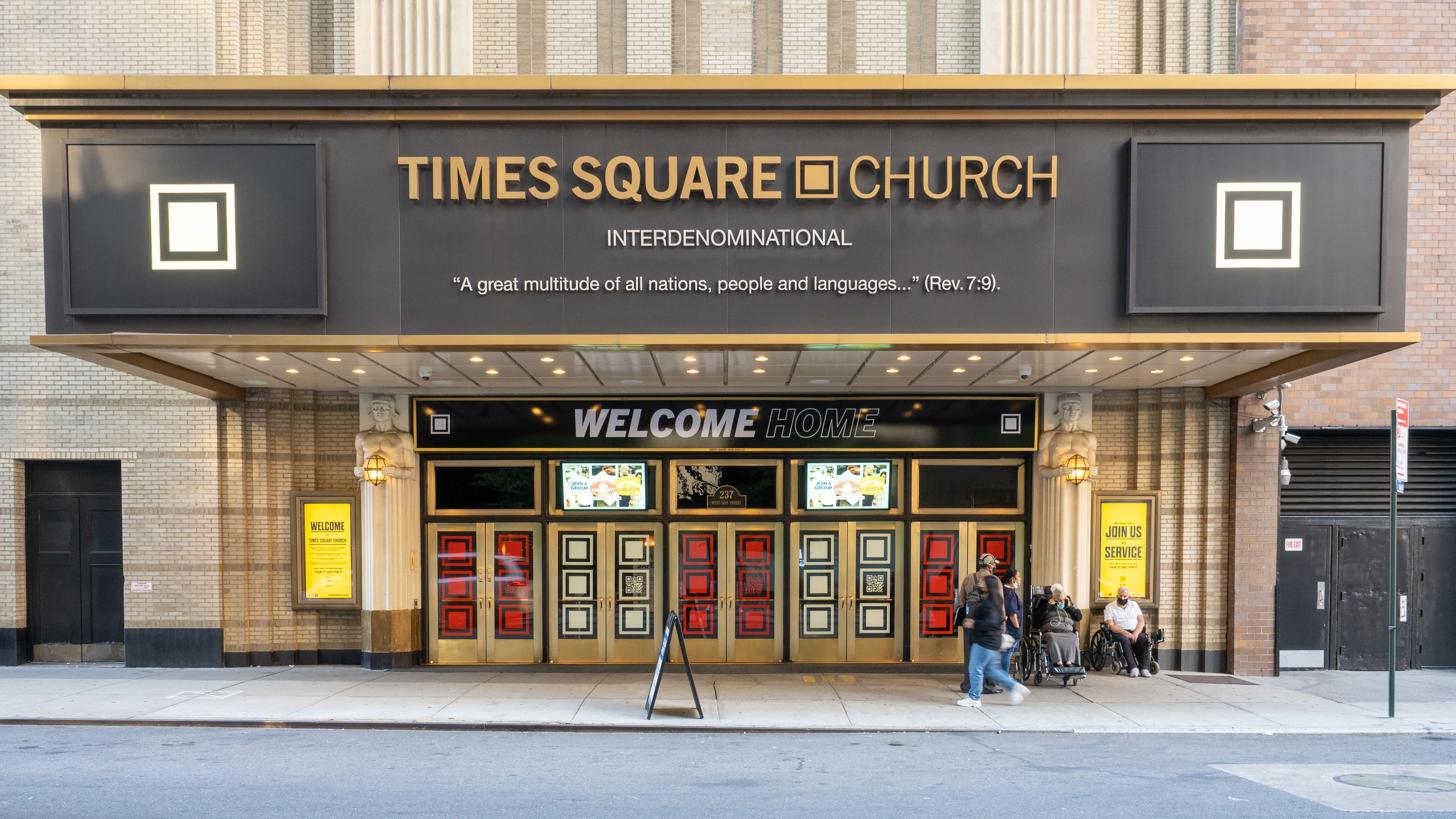
Marquee

In April 1929, Warner Bros. leased the lots at 217 to 233 West 51st Street and 234 West 52nd Street at an annual rate of $40,000. The lease was to run for 17 years, with options for two 21-year extensions. Warner Bros. immediately started planning a movie palace on the site. The company planned to build an entrance from Broadway, on the eastern end of the block. The theater was to have 1,600 seats on an orchestra and a balcony level, and it would be the first Broadway theater built specifically for films. Warner Bros. had chosen this site specifically because it was close to the established Theater District around Times Square. That area, by the 1920s, was starting to see the development of movie theaters alongside legitimate venues for live theater.

The Warner Bros. Hollywood Theatre opened on April 22, 1930, with the Warner Technicolor musical film Hold Everything, starring Winnie Lightner and Joe E. Brown. The storefronts on Broadway were leased out for uses such as a Lindy's restaurant. For its first two years, the Hollywood only screened films. These included Moby Dick and The Beggar of Bagdad in 1930, as well as Bought and The Mad Genius in 1931. Lou Holtz announced his intention in early 1932 to lease the theater for vaudeville. Holtz's vaudeville revues opened that February, but they stopped two months later because Holtz said his simultaneous acting and producing of these revues was "strenuous". Vaudeville returned in November 1932 when Arthur George Klein took over the theater for twice-a-day revue performances. By February 1933, the Hollywood was again dark, and the theater returned to hosting films afterward. During 1933, Warner Bros. acquired additional land at 235 to 239 West 51st Street from the Shubert brothers. Generally, the Hollywood's films were not successful, and the venue stood empty for long periods.

==== Alternating live shows and film ====
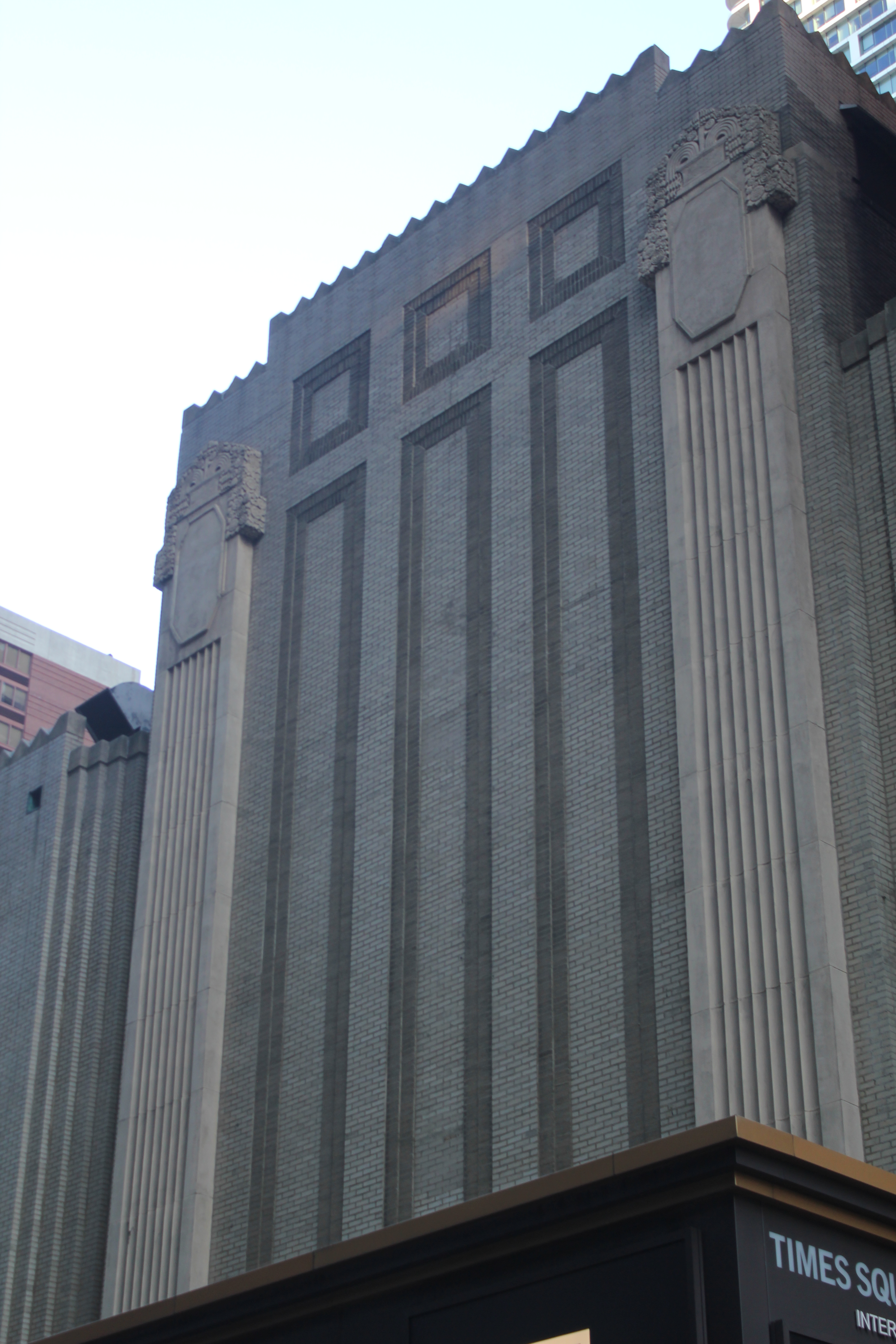
Top of the entrance

Warner Bros. announced in October 1934 that it would renovate the stage for theatrical use and add 32 dressing rooms. These changes were to accommodate Hollywood's first theatrical production: Calling All Stars, a musical revue with Martha Raye, which opened in December 1934 and ran 35 performances. In October 1935, the Hollywood hosted the premiere of the Warner Bros. film A Midsummer Night's Dream, starring James Cagney and Olivia de Havilland. The following March, Earl Carroll negotiated with Warner Bros. to rename the Hollywood Theatre for himself and stage musicals there. The theater was leased to George Abbott and renamed the 51st Street Theatre in late 1936. The theater's main entrance was relocated from Broadway to 51st Street, as Warner Bros. wished to use the Broadway entrance for films and the 51st Street entrance for legitimate productions. Abbott's play Sweet River opened that October and closed after five performances.

The 51st Street Theatre reverted to film in 1937; Warner Bros. planned to either host its own films or rent the theater out for screenings. The Hollywood Theatre name was restored in August 1937 with the screening of The Life of Emile Zola, the first premiere at the theater since A Midsummer Night's Dream. Further films followed until October 1938, when another live production opened, the Gilbert and Sullivan-themed musical Knights of Song. This was followed by the 1939 edition of George White's Scandals, a transfer from the Alvin Theatre, which ran for a month at the Hollywood. In 1940, the theater was again renamed the 51st Street Theatre, presenting a revival of Romeo and Juliet with Laurence Olivier and Vivien Leigh that May. Though the play had been highly promoted, it ran for only 36 performances. This was followed in October 1940 by a three-week performance by the Ballet Russe de Monte-Carlo, then in November by performances from Colonel Wassily de Basil's Original Ballet Russe.

The theater reverted to the Hollywood Theatre name and again began showing films. A renovation of the Hollywood Theatre was announced in mid-1941, when Eddie Cantor's musical Banjo Eyes was booked. Banjo Eyes opened in December 1941 and ran for 129 performances, ultimately closing after Cantor became ill. Following Banjo Eyes, the Hollywood returned to showing films exclusively for several years. The film Casablanca, which subsequently became a hit and a classic, premiered at the Hollywood in 1942. Among the films screened at the Hollywood in the mid-1940s were This Is the Army (1943), Old Acquaintance (1943), The Adventures of Mark Twain (1944), The Corn Is Green (1945), and Night and Day (1946). The Hollywood Theatre became the Warner Theatre in August 1947 with the premiere of the film Life with Father.

=== Mark Hellinger Theatre ===
==== Late 1940s and 1950s ====
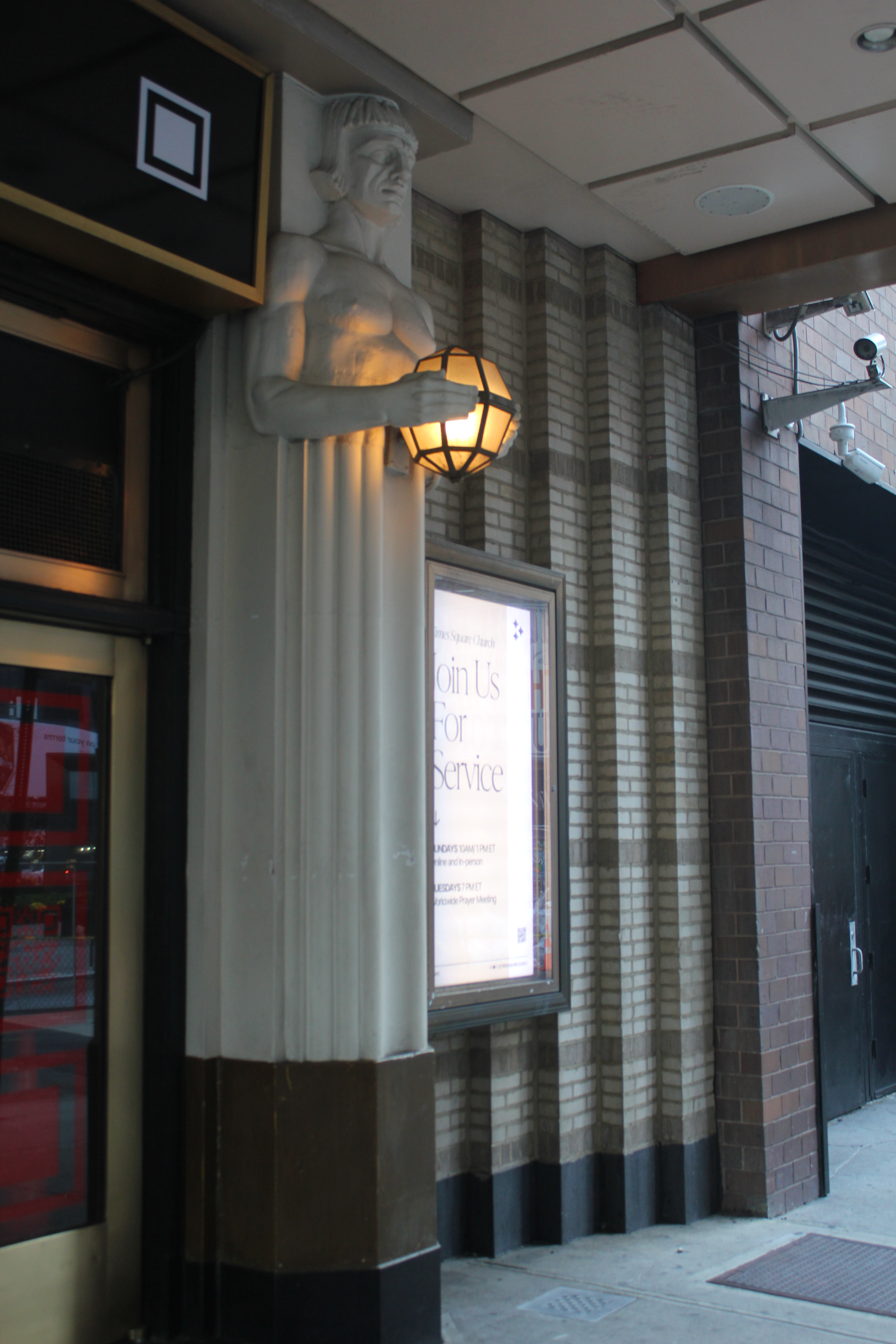
Signboard and brickwork to the east (right) of the entrance

The producer Anthony Brady Farrell agreed to purchase the Warner Theatre in June 1948 for about $1.5 million; the sale was finalized the next month. Farrell announced plans to rename the theater for Mark Hellinger, a Broadway journalist and critic who had died the year before, and he proposed renovating the theater for legitimate plays and musicals. The theater was dedicated under its new name on January 16, 1949, and Farrell's musical All for Love opened the next week on January 22, with Paul Hartman, Grace Hartman, and Bert Wheeler. All for Love lost money but ran 121 performances. This was followed by S. M. Chartock's three-week-long showcase of Gilbert and Sullivan productions in late 1949. Despite a string of early losses, as well as a weekly expenditure of $4,500 to $5,000 for the Hellinger's maintenance, Farrell was optimistic about the theater's potential to make money. Farrell's musical Texas Li'l Darlin', featuring Kenny Delmar, opened at the end of 1949. Texas Li'l Darlin' was the first hit in the Hellinger's history, running for 293 performances.

Tickets, Please! transferred from the Coronet Theatre in late 1950, followed by the Harold Rome revue Bless You All at the end that year. Premiering in 1951 was Two on the Aisle with Bert Lahr and Dolores Gray, which had 276 performances. Three Wishes for Jamie opened there the next year and ran for 92 performances, some at the Plymouth Theatre. Chartock returned in late 1952 with a four-week engagement of Gilbert and Sullivan productions, followed by Guthrie McClintic and the Greek National Theater with two plays by Sophocles. The musical Hazel Flagg by Jule Styne opened in 1953; The New York Times had reported by then that the Broadway entrance had been "discontinued". The Broadway lobby was then leased out to a clothier in late 1953.

The Girl in Pink Tights, the final show of the late composer Sigmund Romberg, premiered in 1954 and closed after 115 performances. The Ballets Espagnols also performed at the Hellinger that November for a four-week run. The Amish-themed musical Plain and Fancy opened in January 1955 and was a hit with 461 total performances, some at the Winter Garden Theatre. The same year, the Hellinger hosted Ankles Aweigh for 176 performances. The Hellinger had its greatest success with the musical My Fair Lady, with lyrics by Alan Jay Lerner and a score by Frederick Loewe. My Fair Lady opened in March 1956 and eventually ran more than 2,700 total performances across multiple theaters, becoming the longest-running Broadway production ever at the time. Prior to the success of My Fair Lady, there was a rumor in the theatrical community that the Hellinger was destined to never host a hit. A year after My Fair Lady opened, Farrell sold the Hellinger to Max and Stanley Stahl, who had already purchased the neighboring building on Broadway. The new owners chartered a company called Mark Hellinger Theatre Inc.

==== 1960s to mid-1970s ====
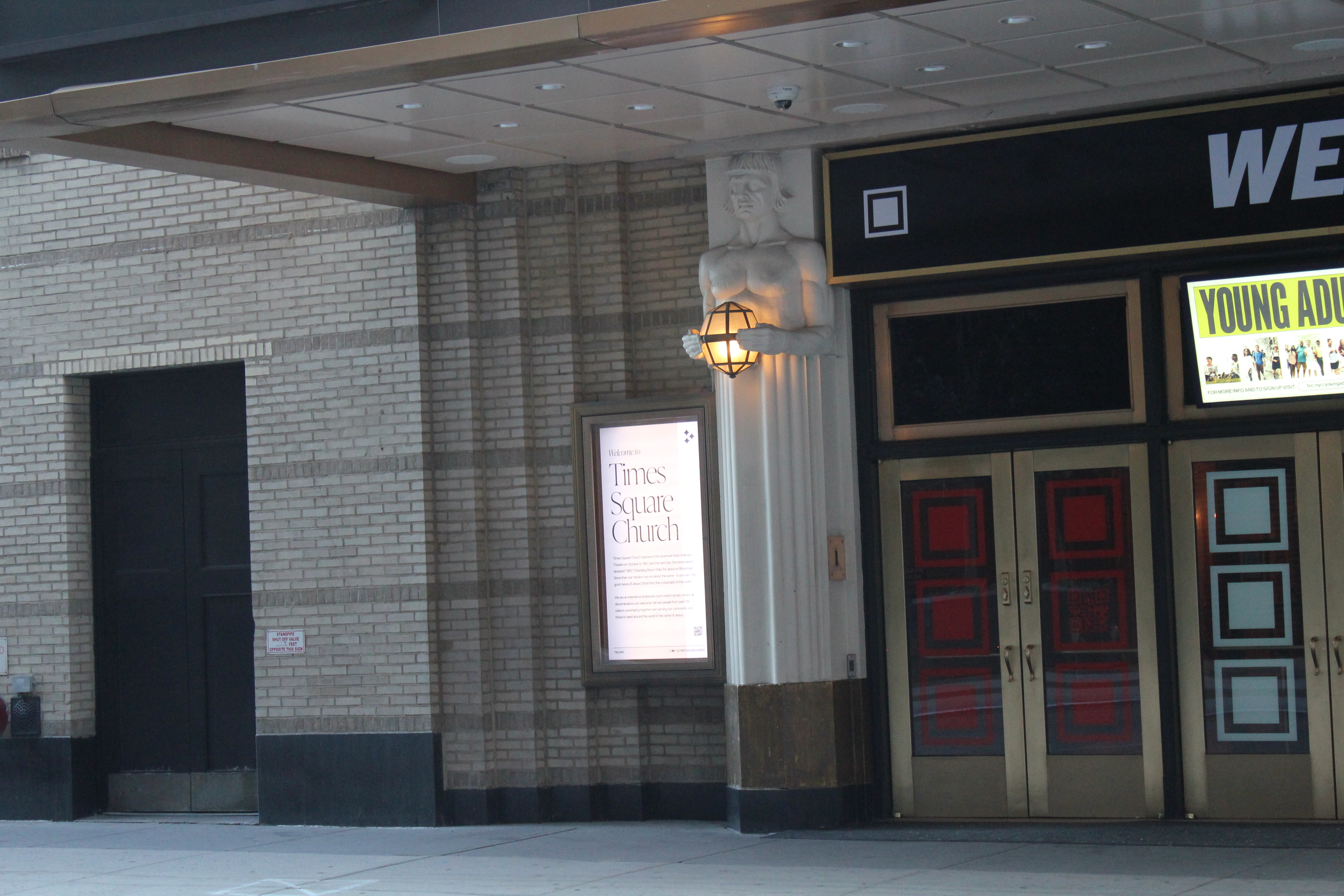
Statue and signboard to the west (left) of the entrance

In the 1960s, the Hellinger continued to host several popular musicals. Richard Rodgers and Samuel Taylor tried to stage their musical No Strings, but My Fair Lady's producer refused to move. The New York Supreme Court ruled in February 1962 that My Fair Lady had to relocate, but Rodgers and Taylor had booked another theater by then. The Rodgers and Hammerstein musical The Sound of Music then transferred to the Hellinger from the Lunt-Fontanne for the last seven months of the musical's run. The Italian-language Rugantino was staged in 1964 with live supertitles on the proscenium, though it flopped in spite of critical acclaim. Styne, Betty Comden, and Adolph Green's musical Fade Out – Fade In also opened in 1964, featuring Jack Cassidy and Carol Burnett. On a Clear Day You Can See Forever opened in 1965 with a score by Burton Lane and Lerner. The same year, a 40-foot-wide (12 m) bar counter was installed in the lounge's rotunda.

The late 1960s were characterized by several unsuccessful musicals. The musical A Joyful Noise in 1966, with choreography by Michael Bennett, ended after just 12 performances. The Martha Graham Dance Company had a limited engagement at the theater the next year. Also staged in 1967 was Illya Darling with Melina Mercouri, which ran 319 performances without turning a profit. A third flop followed in 1968, the Biblical musical I'm Solomon with Dick Shawn and Karen Morrow. The same year, the Hellinger hosted ballet performances from Les Ballets Africains; a premiere of the documentary New York City—The Most; and a limited concert engagement by Marlene Dietrich. Two productions followed in 1969: Jerry Herman's Dear World, featuring Angela Lansbury, and Lerner and André Previn's Coco, starring Katharine Hepburn in her only Broadway musical.

The Hellinger hosted its first Tony Awards ceremony in 1969; it also hosted the 1970 Tony Awards. The Hellinger next staged the flop Ari and the final performances of the long-running off-Broadway production Man of La Mancha in 1971. This was followed the same year by Andrew Lloyd Webber and Tim Rice's Jesus Christ Superstar, which ran for 720 performances (Note: Sometimes cited as 711 performances) over the next two years. A mixture of successes and failures followed. The Martha Graham Dance Company returned in 1974 and 1975 to critical acclaim. Conversely, the all-male revival of As You Like It (1974), The Skin of Our Teeth (1975), and 1600 Pennsylvania Avenue (1976) were all flops, with less than ten performances each. Meanwhile, the Stahls had unofficially put the Hellinger on the market by 1975, and the Nederlander Organization bought the theater the next year.

==== Late 1970s and 1980s ====
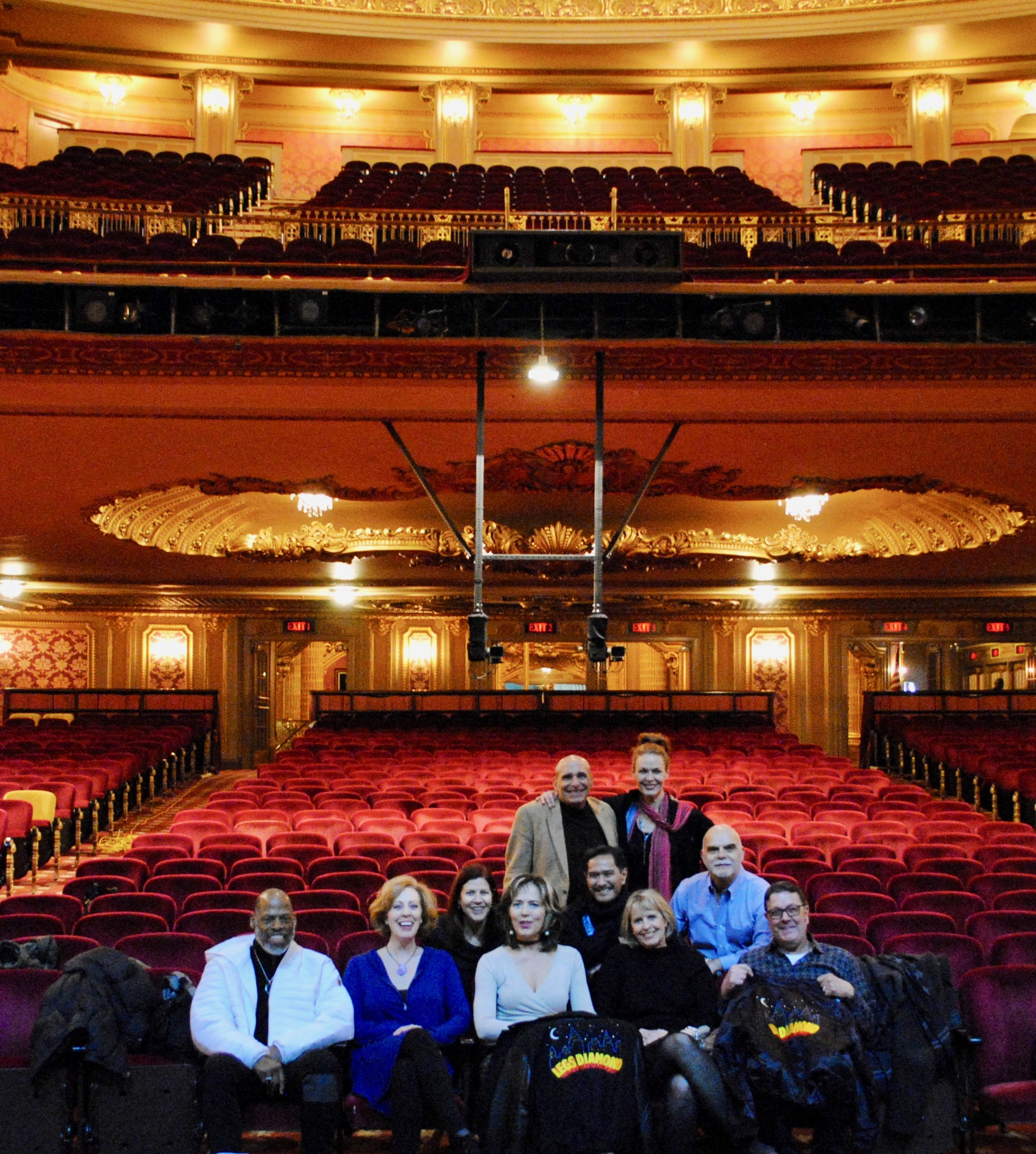
The cast of Legs Diamond posing at the theater, 2017

The Hellinger's 1978 productions of Timbuktu! with Eartha Kitt and Platinum with Alexis Smith were both short-lived. This was followed in 1979 by Saravá, a musical with a score by Mitch Leigh; the Joffrey Ballet, with Rudolf Nureyev as the featured artist; and The Utter Glory of Morrissey Hall, which closed on its opening night. The Hellinger finally hosted a successful show in late 1979 when Ann Miller and Mickey Rooney costarred in the burlesque Sugar Babies, which had 1,208 performances there over the next three years. The Tony Awards returned to the Hellinger in 1980 and 1981. After the closure of Sugar Babies in 1982, the Hellinger hosted the Comden and Green musical A Doll's Life, which closed after five performances. The magician Doug Henning costarred with Chita Rivera in the 1983 musical Merlin, which ran for 199 performances. Merlin ended to make way for Chaplin, a musical that never opened. Afterward, the British musical Oliver! had a short run at the Hellinger in 1984.

Michael Bennett negotiated to buy a half-interest in the theater's ownership in 1984, the same year that Jerry Weintraub purchased a stake in the operation of the Hellinger. In 1985, the Hellinger hosted Grind for 75 performances and Tango Argentino for about 200 performances. The 1985 film A Chorus Line was also partly filmed at the theater. Throughout the remainder of the 1980s, the Hellinger hosted short runs, solo shows, and industry event. The musical Rags ran for just four performances in 1986, and dance production Flamenco Puro appeared later the same year. The Hellinger then hosted the 1987 Tony Awards, as well as personal appearances from Smokey Robinson/Jean Carne, Virsky Company, Rodney Dangerfield, and the Georgian State Dance Company. The Hellinger hosted Shakespeare's Macbeth with Glenda Jackson and Christopher Plummer in early 1988. At the end of the year, the theater premiered its final legitimate production, Legs Diamond.

The New York City Landmarks Preservation Commission (LPC) had started to consider protecting the Hellinger as a landmark in 1982, with discussions continuing over the next several years. The LPC designated the Hellinger's interior as a landmark on November 17, 1987, followed by the facade in January 1988. This was part of the commission's wide-ranging effort in 1987 to grant landmark status to Broadway theaters. The New York City Board of Estimate ratified the designations in March 1988. The Nederlanders, the Shuberts, and Jujamcyn collectively sued the LPC in June 1988 to overturn the landmark designations of 22 theaters, including the Hellinger, on the merit that the designations severely limited the extent to which the theaters could be modified. The lawsuit was escalated to the New York Supreme Court and the Supreme Court of the United States, but these designations were ultimately upheld in 1992.

=== Times Square Church ===
==== Lease ====
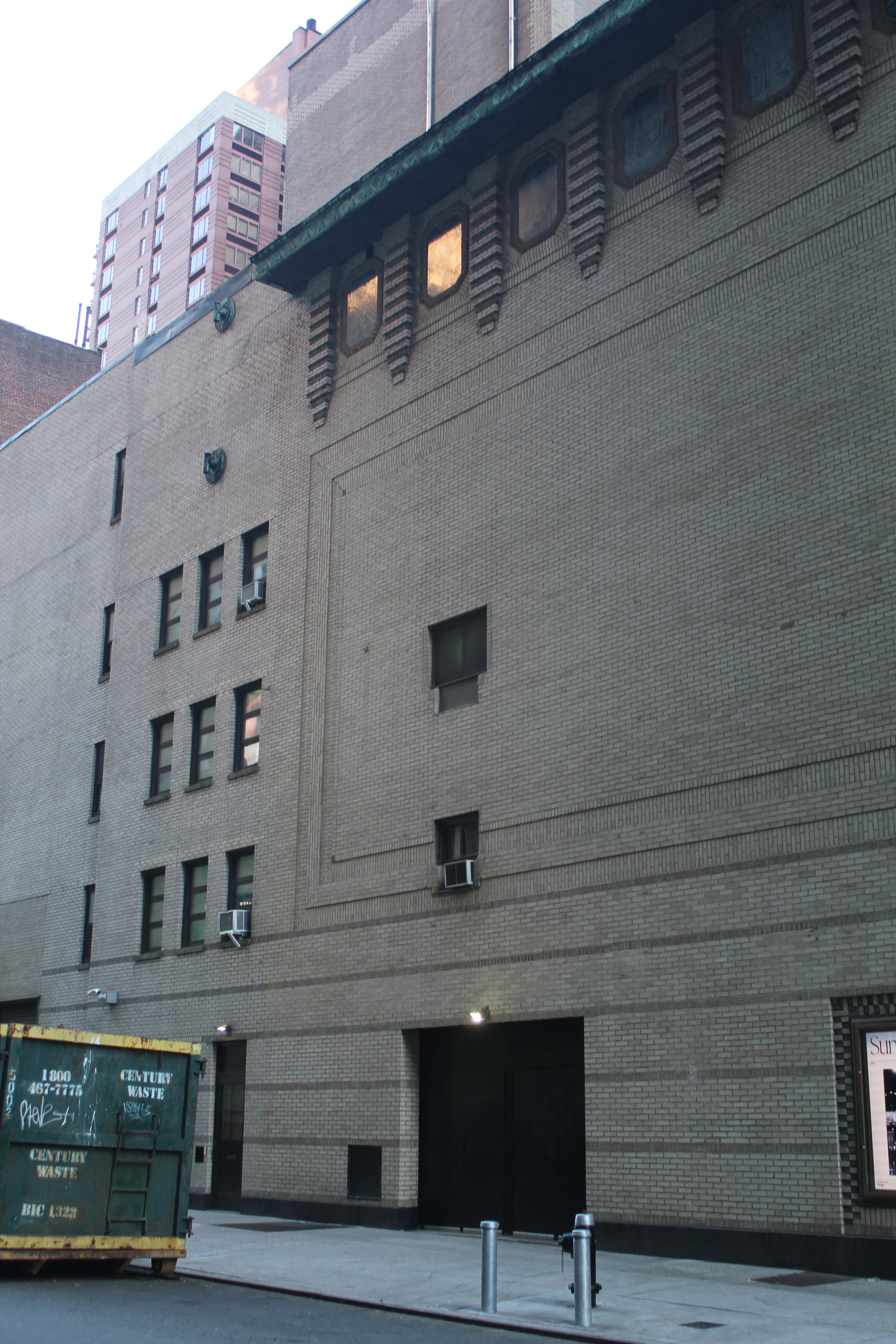
Stage house

In February 1989, the Nederlander Organization leased the Hellinger to the Times Square Church, headed by the Rev. David Wilkerson, for $1 million per year on a five-year lease. At the time, the church occupied the 1,150-seat Nederlander Theatre, which was at standing-room only capacity five days a week. In addition, the Broadway theatrical industry was struggling to stage works, and James M. Nederlander said: "It's a short-term lease—five years is short term for me. It'll pass before you know it." Had the Nederlanders retained the Hellinger as a legitimate venue, the organization could have rented the theater for large musicals at $1.04 million a year, but it would be far from a consistent income stream. Legs Diamond closed later the same month. According to The New York Times: "To many theater people, the leasing of the Hellinger, [...] which has long been considered one of the best and most beautiful theaters for musicals, was a sad symbol of both the state of Broadway and of the Nederlander organization."

The Times Square Church moved to the Hellinger in March 1989. That August, the LPC held a hearing on whether the westernmost 26-foot-wide (7.9 m) section of the theater could be demolished to make way for a hotel developed by Silverstein Properties. The planned hotel would have used air rights from above the theater, which would have necessitated restoring the Hellinger for legitimate use. The producer Cameron Mackintosh expressed interest in leasing the Hellinger for his production Miss Saigon in 1990, but he ultimately leased the nearby Broadway Theatre. Rocco Landesman of the rival chain Jujamcyn had also offered to buy the theater, but he said high maintenance costs precluded him or any other producer from offering more than $7 million.

==== Purchase and subsequent years ====
In December 1991, the Nederlanders sold the Hellinger to the church's congregation for a reported $17 million. Wilkerson then spent several years renovating the theater for his congregation. In the years after the Times Square Church's purchase, the church became so popular that the Hellinger could not accommodate all congregants, despite the theater's 1,600-seat capacity. The congregation at the theater numbered 4,000 in 1997 and doubled within the next year. As a result, in the late 1990s, an 800-person overflow room and eight secondary meeting rooms were leased in the neighboring Novotel hotel. (Note: The Novotel building was built in the early 1980s over the structure that formerly housed the theater's Broadway entrance.) By 2001, screens were installed both in the lobby and in a neighboring annex to allow additional congregants to view services.

Theatrical producers have made several unsuccessful attempts to buy the Hellinger from the Times Square Church. As early as 1993, Lloyd Webber had proposed acquiring the theater for his production of Sunset Boulevard. In addition to Mackintosh and the Bennett estate, offers were reportedly made by former Canadian impresario Garth Drabinsky, theatrical operator Shubert Organization, and corporate producers Disney and Clear Channel. As of 2026, the Times Square Church still occupied the Hellinger and did not plan to sell it.

The Times Square Church maintains the theater's interior decor and opens it to the public for regular services. The church also hosts tours of the theater, as during Christmas 2016, when it gave tours along with live performances of the Nativity play Bethlehem on Broadway.

== Stage productions ==
Productions are listed by the year of their first performance. This list only includes Broadway productions and live shows; it does not include films screened there.

Notable productions at the theater
Opening year	Name	Refs.
1934	Calling All Stars	
1936	Sweet River	
1938	Knights of Song	
1939	George White's Scandals	
1940	Romeo and Juliet	
1940	Ballet Russe de Monte-Carlo	
1940	Original Ballet Russe, Colonel de Basil's	
1941	Banjo Eyes	
1949	All for Love	
1949	Gilbert and Sullivan Series (four productions)	(Note: In both 1949 and 1952, The Mikado, Pirates of Penzance, H.M.S. Pinafore, and Trial by Jury were performed. Iolanthe was also performed in 1952.)
1949	Texas, Li'l Darlin'	
1950	Tickets, Please!	
1950	Bless You All	
1951	Two on the Aisle	
1952	Three Wishes for Jamie	
1952	Gilbert and Sullivan Series (five productions)	
1952	Electra	(Note: Presented by Guthrie McClintic and the Greek National Theater as part of their series of two Sophocles plays.)
1952	Oedipus Tyrannus	
1953	Hazel Flagg	
1954	The Girl in Pink Tights	
1954	Hit the Trail	
1955	Plain and Fancy	
1955	Ankles Aweigh	
1955	Antonio	
1956	My Fair Lady	
1962	The Sound of Music	
1964	Rugantino	
1964	A Funny Thing Happened on the Way to the Forum	
1964	Fade Out – Fade In	
1965	On a Clear Day You Can See Forever	
1966	A Joyful Noise	
1967	Martha Graham and Company	
1967	Illya Darling	
1968	Les Ballets Africains	
1968	I'm Solomon	
1968	Marlene Dietrich	
1969	Dear World	
1969	Coco	
1971	Ari	
1971	Man of La Mancha	
1971	Jesus Christ Superstar	
1973	Seesaw	
1974–1975	Martha Graham and Company	
1974	As You Like It	
1975	The Skin of Our Teeth	
1976	1600 Pennsylvania Avenue	
1976	Porgy and Bess	
1977	Shenandoah	
1977	Lou Rawls on Broadway	
1978	Timbuktu!	
1978	Platinum	
1979	Saravá	
1979	Homage to Diaghilev	
1979	The Utter Glory of Morrissey Hall	
1979	Sugar Babies	
1982	A Doll's Life	
1983	Merlin	
1984	Oliver!	
1985	Grind	
1985	Tango Argentino	
1986	Rags	
1986	Flamenco Puro	
1986	Smokey Robinson Plus Jean Carne	
1987	La serva padrona	
1987	Pulcinella	
1987	Il Berretto a Songali	
1987	Podrecca Puppet Theatre Company	
1987	La serva amorosa	
1988	Virsky's Ukrainian State Dance Company	
1988	Rodney Dangerfield on Broadway!	
1988	Macbeth	
1988	Georgian State Dance Company	
1988	Legs Diamond	

== See also ==
- List of Broadway theaters § Existing former Broadway theaters
- List of New York City Designated Landmarks in Manhattan from 14th to 59th Streets
