= Clark Gesner =

American composer and author (1938–2002)

- Gesner (center, with flower) with director Joseph Hardy and the original 1967 cast of You're a Good Man, Charlie Brown.

Background information
- Born: March 27, 1938; Augusta, Maine, U.S.
- Died: July 23, 2002 (aged 64) New York City, U.S.
- Occupations: Composer, author, actor

Clark Gesner (March 27, 1938 – July 23, 2002) was an American composer, songwriter, author, and actor. He is best known for composing the musical You're a Good Man, Charlie Brown, based on the Charles M. Schulz comic strip Peanuts.

None of his other musicals (most notably The Utter Glory of Morrissey Hall in 1979) had been able to match the success of ...Charlie Brown, though he had small success in regional productions (mostly Animal Fair in 1990).

Gesner's song "Happiness" became a hit standard in the 1960s, being recorded by various artists. The latter was also recorded in a smooth jazz version by David Benoit in May 2000, shortly after Charles M. Schulz's death, on an album entitled Here's To You, Charlie Brown: 50 Great Years! The album made it to #2 on the Top Jazz Albums chart.

== Early life ==
Born and raised in Augusta, Maine, and later moving to Brooklyn, New York, Gesner was born to H. Mortimer Gesner Jr., and Eleanor Clark Gesner. He attended high school in Plainfield, New Jersey, where he wrote and performed in theater productions. Gesner attended Princeton University and was a member of the Triangle Club, the university's theater group. There, he began writing and producing original musical comedies. Following his graduation from Princeton, Gesner kept close ties to his alma mater, serving as a member of the graduate board of the Triangle Club, and regularly patronizing performances by other groups on the Princeton campus, such as the Princeton University Players and Theatre Intime.

Drafted into the United States Army in 1961, Gesner spent his two-year military career at Governor's Island and in Manhattan selling theater tickets at the USO in Times Square, where he regularly attended Broadway theater productions. He subsequently joined ASCAP in 1962.

== Early work on television ==
Gesner found work in New York City as a writer and composer for the television programs Captain Kangaroo in 1955 and Mister Mayor in 1964. He later wrote for the shows Sesame Street and The Electric Company. For the latter, his music or writing was used in over 700 episodes.

== You're a Good Man, Charlie Brown ==
=== Concept album ===
During the early 1960s, Gesner had begun writing songs based on Charles Schulz's Charlie Brown comic strip characters but was unable to get permission from the United Features Syndicate to use the characters in his songs. Eventually Gesner sent Schulz a tape of some of the songs and Gesner soon had permission to record them, which he did in 1966.

At the time, Gesner had no plans for a musical based on this pre-production "concept album." However, producer Arthur Whitelaw, who would later go on to write another musical based on Peanuts, encouraged Gesner to turn the album into a musical.

=== Stage musical ===
The stage adaptation of the concept album, entitled You're a Good Man, Charlie Brown, went into rehearsal in New York City on February 10, 1967. Prior to its opening, the musical had no actual libretto; it was several vignettes with a musical number for each one. On March 7, 1967, the musical premiered Off-Broadway and was a big hit, running for 1,597 performances. Walter Kerr in The New York Times called the show "a miracle", saying, "Almost everything works, because almost everything is effortless."

Since its premiere, ...Charlie Brown has become an international success, spawning two Broadway productions (a 1971 transfer and a 1999 revival), over nine U.S. tours, a 1968 West End production, and a 2008 Manhattan concert performance, along with productions in Baltimore, Maryland, New Jersey, Toronto, and Altoona among others.

== Subsequent writing career ==
=== Musical theatre ===
Gesner's second Broadway musical, The Utter Glory of Morrissey Hall, was much less successful. It closed at the Mark Hellinger Theatre after seven previews and one regular performance.

The Jello Is Always Red, a musical revue of cabaret songs with book, music and lyrics by Gesner, was staged off-Broadway in New York in 1998 by The York Theatre Company. The show played from June 3 to 28, 1998 at the York Theatre, lasting 11 previews and 21 regular performances.

Animal Fair, a show with book, music and lyrics by Gesner, is a series of vignettes that depict everyday animals in human situations. It premiered in 1990 at the Denver Center Theatre and was subsequently produced by Brooklyn's Gallery Players in 2001.

The Bloomers, a musical with music and lyrics by Gesner, and book by Garet Scott based on The Letter by Somerset Maugham, was first produced in May 2000 at the off-off-Broadway Red Room.

Among Gesner's other works is a yet-to-be-produced musical based on the cartoon character Betty Boop. Gesner collaborated with Garet Scott on several off-off-Broadway movie parodies, including Down! Down! Down!, Thirty Seconds To Hell, A Town Called Shame, and Bongo Fever.

Some of Gesner's well known compositions include "The Ivy League Look", a song for the Triangle Club, and "Little Known Facts", a musical number from You're a Good Man, Charlie Brown.

As an actor, Gesner performed regionally in theatre productions, including 1776, Lend Me a Tenor, and Carnival!, among others. He sang on the original concept album of You're a Good Man, Charlie Brown as Linus van Pelt and sang with Barbara Minkus on four bonus tracks on the original cast recording of the Off-Broadway cast of You're a Good Man, Charlie Brown.

=== Television ===
Gesner wrote for NBC Experiment in Television in 1967, shortly before completing You're a Good Man, Charlie Brown. The 1968 television series The Ed Sullivan Show used Gesner's songs "You're a Good Man, Charlie Brown" and "Happiness", both of which had become hits at the time. The latter was also used in the TV special A Family Thing, also in 1968. Gesner then co-wrote the TV special Out to Lunch (1974). His music can be heard in The Electric Company (1977), You're a Good Man, Charlie Brown (1985), You Don't Look 40, Charlie Brown (1990), and Diva (2010).

=== Print ===
Gesner wrote theater reviews for the local weekly, the Brooklyn Heights Press (part of the Brooklyn Eagle chain).

== Death ==
Gesner died of a heart attack at age 64 on July 23, 2002, in downtown New York City. He was never married.

== Awards and nominations ==
Award	Show/Song	Result
New York Park Association Award for Best Song	Ode To a Park	Won
Outer Critics Circle Award for Best Production	You're a Good Man, Charlie Brown	Won
Grammy Award for Best Score from an Original Cast Show Album	You're a Good Man, Charlie Brown	Nominated
Grammy Award for Best Musical Show Album°°	You're a Good Man, Charlie Brown	Nominated

°°Nomination shared with Andrew Lippa
