= I'm Solomon =

- Music: Ernest Gold
- Lyrics: Anne Croswell
- Book: Anne Croswell; Dan Almagor
- Basis: original play "King Solomon and the Cobbler" by Sammy Gronemann; American adaptation in collaboration with Zvi Kolitz; Special material by David Finkle and Bill Weeden
- Productions: 1968

I'm Solomon is a 1968 musical with music by Ernest Gold, lyrics by Anne Croswell, and book by Croswell and Dan Almagor. It opened 23 April 1968 and closed 27 April after seven performances.

The play was profiled in the William Goldman book The Season: A Candid Look at Broadway. Goldman wrote, "The show advertised itself as 'A New Musical with a Cast of 60.' That's got to tell you something.
I mean, when movies have made "a cast of thousands" a cliché, what's "a cast of 60" supposed to do to your pulse? One peek at the program indicated more trouble: the set designer had a box around his name, and when the outstanding billing for a show goes to the set designer, you just know you're in for a bumpy crossing." Goldman estimated the musical lost between $700,000 and $800,000.

== Background ==
The musical (originally called In Someone Else's Sandals) was based on a 1938 German-language play, King Solomon and the Cobbler. It had been performed in Palestine and New York in Yiddish, and was turned into a 1964 folk musical which toured the world. A new book and score were written for the American production. The book was originally by Erich Segal and Anne Crosswell, although Segal had his name removed from it. The original director was Michael Benthall and the composer was Ernest Gold, whose work included the film score for Exodus.

Ken Mandelbaum wrote that the show "featured two of the most flop-prone performers of recent musical theatre history, Carmen Mathews (Zenda, Courtin' Time, The Yearling, Dear World, Ambassador, Copperfield) and Karen Morrow (I Had a Ball, A Joyful Noise, The Selling of the President,
The Grass Harp)." John Chapman of the New York News called it a "solemn and very colorful spectacle."

When the show closed in a week, coproducer Zvi Kolitz told the press I’m Solomon had been the 'victim of the arbitrariness, haughtiness, shallowness, and heartlessness of the television critics.' It lost over $700,000, making it and the then recent Darling of the Day the most expensive musical flops to date." Kolitz said the musical "had a couple of nice songs and an extremely silly book. But what places it firmly in the category of the bizarre was the absurdly overblown production it received... there were enormous sets, large choral numbers, harlots, concubines, and belly dancers, all swamping the slender plot, which might have been the basis for a cute off-Broadway musical."

== Premise ==
King Solomon and a lookalike peddler change places for the day.

== Original cast ==
- Mary Barnett as F'htar
- Salome Jens as Makedah
- Carmen Mathews as Bathsheba
- Karen Morrow as Na'Ama
- Fred Pinkard as Ranor
- Paul Reed as Ben-Hesed
- Kenneth Scott as Yoel
- Richy Shawn as Solomon/Yoni
- Barbara Webb as Princess Nofrit
