= Kite-Eating Tree =

Peanuts comic strip character

In one comic strip, Charlie Brown offers his kite to the Tree.

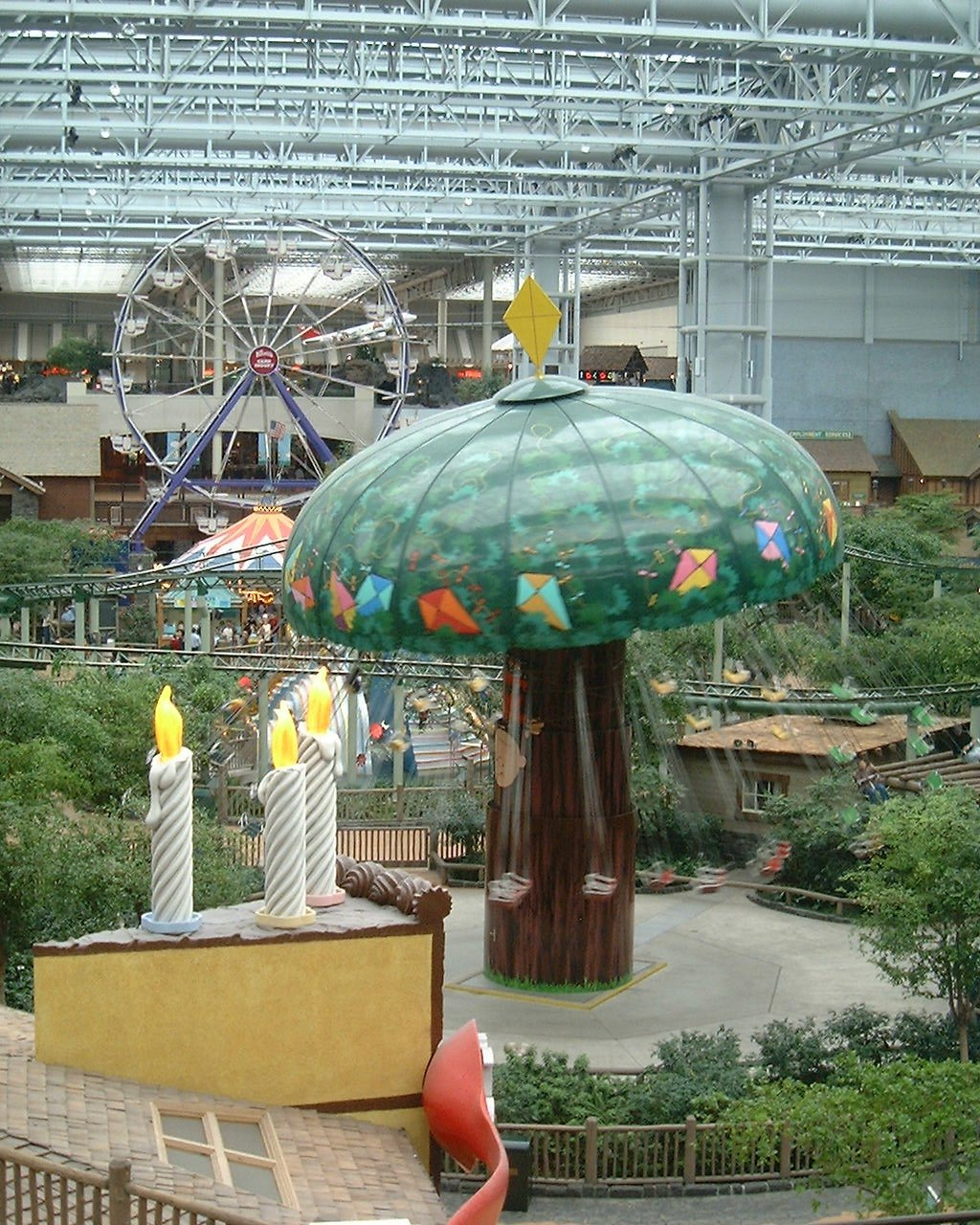
The Kite-Eating Tree was an attraction at Camp Snoopy in the Mall of America before the rebrand in 2006.

The Kite-Eating Tree is a fictional tree in the Peanuts comic strip created by Charles M. Schulz. In the comics, when Charlie Brown attempts to fly a kite, the kite always ends up tangled in the tree.

Schulz considered the tree one of the series' 12 major set pieces. He created the tree in response to his experiences with kites getting caught in trees, both as a child and when flying kites with his children. He stated that the kite "usually disappears over a period of several weeks. Now obviously the kite had to go someplace, so it seemed to me that the tree must be eating it."

In the first series featuring the Kite-Eating Tree, which ran in April 1956, Charlie Brown's anger is directed at the kite, with the punch line that he is satisfied only when he and the kite are both soaked in a downpour. This instance was cited as demonstrating that the "humor of Peanuts lies in the extremity of bad luck the characters" face. In a 1977 series, Charlie Brown bit the tree, after which he received a legal notification from the Environmental Protection Agency. In yet another series in January 1969, Lucy becomes so enraged at Schroeder continually ignoring her that she seizes his piano and throws it up into the tree, which proceeds to devour it. In later comics and animation the tree appeared with a visible mouth, at times grinning or reacting to Charlie Brown's tirades.

The Kite-Eating Tree has played a part in adaptations of the comic strip, including the musical You're a Good Man, Charlie Brown (1967) and The Peanuts Movie (2015). And it is featured as part of a ride at Camp Snoopy, the Peanuts-themed area within Knott's Berry Farm. At the Charles M. Schulz Museum and Research Center, a tree in the courtyard is designated as a representation of the Kite-Eating Tree.

== In popular culture ==
In the Robot Chicken episode "Vegetable Funfest" in the skit "The Time of the Great Pumpkin", a parody of It's the Great Pumpkin, Charlie Brown where Linus summons the Great Pumpkin using black magic which goes around killing the Peanuts characters in a horror movie fashion. The last survivor Charlie Brown flees to the Kite-Eating Tree which ends up eating the Great Pumpkin, saving Charlie Brown's life and ending the Great Pumpkin's rampage.

== Reception ==
In an editorial from 1964, the U.S. Catholic stated that Charlie Brown's encounters with the Kite-Eating Tree represent "defeat, but not capitulation" because Charlie Brown "refuses to concede that the impossible won't someday happen—that he will manage to get the kite in the sky, where it belongs."
