= List of animated Sesame Street characters =

This is a partial list of the more well known animated characters appearing on Sesame Street. Some are animated versions of Muppet characters, others appear only in animated segments.

Name	Animator(s) / Film Studio	Voiced by	Year(s)	Description
Abby Cadabby	Peter de Sève	Leslie Carrara-Rudolph	2006–present	Computer-generated version appearing in the stand-alone animation Abby's Flying Fairy School.
Alice Braithwaite Goodyshoes	Ken Snyder	Joan Gerber	1969–1973	Called by Sesame Street's early producers "an arrogant, sanctimonious know-it-all", she frequently opened her segments by announcing, "This is Alice Braithwaite Goodyshoes, the smartest girl in the whole world!"
Alligator King	Bud Luckey	Turk Murphy	1972	A King of alligators who challenged his seven sons to cheer him up. He was created by Bud Luckey.
Arnold	Craig Bartlett		1990	A boy who demonstrates his imagination, visiting exotic lands without ever getting up from his chair. Originally developed by Craig Bartlett in clay-animation in several short films, Arnold eventually transitioned into cel-animation to star in his own show Hey Arnold!, on Nickelodeon.
Batman	Filmation	Olan Soule	1970	An animated version of the DC Comics character who appeared in Sesame Street's first season.
Beetle Bailey	King Features Syndicate		1974	An animated segment featuring Beetle Bailey and his company was seen during the 1970s on Sesame Street, demonstrating to young viewers the concept of "first" and "last".
Bellhop	Michael Sporn		1988-1989	A bellhop who would almost complete a task that his boss, the hotel manager, asks for - 2 lost kids in the lobby; 8 steamer trunks on level 8; walking 10 tiny terriers; 12 wake-up calls; taking an elderly man's two heavy bags to Room 14; carrying the bags to Level 16; bringing a phone call for Table 18; and going to the grocery store for 20 grapefruits. In later years, the manager's voice was re-dubbed by Camille Bonora.
Bert	Misseri Studios	Eric Jacobson	2008–present	Clay animation version appearing in Bert and Ernie's Great Adventures.
The Big Bad Wolf		Jerry Nelson	2002 & 2007	A stop-motion paper-animated variant of the character of the same name, in a firefighter's gear, who sings "Get Out, Stay Out! Don't You Go Back In!", a song about fire safety and what you should do if there's a fire in your house, as he saves the Three Little Pigs from their own house fires, in an animated music video segment used in the 2002 video, Elmo Visits the Firehouse. The same music video segment was later reused in Episode 4145 in 2007.
Billy Jo Jive	Ray Favata		1978-1979	A prepubescent African-American detective (self-described "super crimefighting ace") who, along with his partner Smart Susie Sunset, would solve crimes in his city neighborhood. Produced by Shearer Visuals and former Terrytoons animator Ray Favata and animated by his production partner Ed Seeman.
Blögg	Peter de Sève	Joey Mazzarino	2009–Present	A troll/fairy creature who is one of Abby's classmates in the animated segment Abby's Flying Fairy School, which was created by the animation studio SpeakeasyFX.
Bob	David Wachtenheim & Robert Marianetti		2006	An animated man designed by David Wachtenheim. He introduced each episode of Sesame Street that appears on Old School Volume 1. In his introductions, he starts to talk about the show, and slowly starts talking about himself before an off-camera voice tells him to start the show. Bob is originally based on one of Poverty Pictures segments from 1969 in the Letters X lecture.
Bubbles Martin		Andrea Martin	2002–2006	Appearing on Elmo's TV in four animated segments of Elmo's World, she served a similar function as the Lecturer Lady, and was voiced likewise by Andrea Martin. She performed lively songs relating to the episode's subject. Her design is reminiscent of Betty Boop.
Bumble Ardy	Maurice Sendak	Jim Henson	1971	A young boy who invited 9 swine to his 9th birthday party in an animated short created by children's author Maurice Sendak.
Bugs Bunny	Warner Bros.	Noel Blanc	1992	The classic Looney Tunes character makes a surprise cameo in the music video for Yakiety Yak (Take it Back). He was voiced by Noel Blanc, who had taken over the role from his late father Mel Blanc
Cecille	Will Vinton Studios	Michele Mariana	1990	A singing Claymation orange ball with big red lips who turns into different shapes and sizes. She was created by Teresa Drilling and Barry Bruce.
Christopher Clumsy	Cliff Roberts	Jim Thurman	1972	A genial but clumsy character who debuted in a comic strip by Cliff Roberts. Situations frequently dealt with Clumsy's attempts to avoid falling into a hole. At other times, he attempted to demonstrate directional concepts or teach about shapes.
Computer		Jim Martin	2001	From the Elmo's World segment. Crayon-animated, Computer replaced the "Elmocam" home video portion of the segment.
Cookie Monster		Frank Oz, David Rudman	1972	Cookie Monster appeared in some animated segments, including a cameo in Number Elimination (eating the number 17).
C.T. Wordsworth			1971	A presenter of words ("Big ones, small ones, fat ones and tall ones!")
Dash	Karen Aqua		1991-1999	A white cartoon dog who appears in cartoons Dance to the Rhythm, Dancing with Elmo and Pass Along Alphabet.
Donnie Budd	Bud Luckey	Bud Luckey	1971-1972	A cartoon fiddler. Voiced, written and animated by Pixar's Bud Luckey.
Elmo		Kevin Clash	2009	Elmo appeared in some animated segments including Clay animation version appearing as a cameo in Bert and Ernie's Great Adventures.
Ernie	Misseri Studios	Steve Whitmire	2008–present	Clay animation version appearing in Bert and Ernie's Great Adventures which was created by Misseri Studio in Italy.
Feff	Mo Willems	Ruth Buzzi	1994–2002	The pet cat, who was originally named "Jeff", owned by Suzie Kabloozie.
Firefighter sand drawing			2002	A sand drawing of a firefighter, who is the primary character of the stop-motion animated sand drawing quiz segment in the 2002 video, Elmo Visits the Firehouse, and at the very end, springs to life and demonstrates his job by extinguishing a fire created by a fire-breathing dragon. His only line is "Just doin' my job."
Frances Fairy			1972	Frances Fairy, from the Land of Fork, makes the letter f do things that begin with f.
Frog	Karen Aqua		1990-2003	A green frog who appears in cartoons Animals on Parade, Pass Along Alphabet and The Rhyme Time Song.
Fruta Manzana	Irra Verbitsky / Don Duga	Damaris Carbaugh	1979	An animated Carmen Miranda spoof, she sang and danced, wore an oversized fruit hat, and also had a singing mirror. She was created by Irra Verbitsky and Don Duga.
Gerald	Len Glasser	Len Glasser	1981	A boy who imagines his dog Sparky's shadow is an alligator's shadow.
Gloria	Fred Crippen		1969	A young precocious girl who sang the alphabet (once in fast tempo with lower-case letters, and again in slow tempo, with upper-case letters) while continually being coached by an adult in voiceover (Bob Arbogast). Gloria later recited a poem about how to draw the letter W.
Gloria Globe		Michele Marianna	1990	A cheerful globe who appears as a magician attempting to pull a rabbit out of her hat, but ends up pulling an animal from another country (e.g., a kangaroo from Australia, and many others). Another installment had Gloria being sick due to littering. And another featured Gloria Globe trying to get shot out from a cannon; when that failed, she sang a song about her body parts (which represent the various countries of the earth).
Gonnigan	Peter de Sève	Jeremy Redleaf	2009–present	One of Abby's classmates in the animated segment Abby's Flying Fairy School. Whenever Gonnigan disappears and Mrs. Sparklenose asks where Gonnigan is, Abby Cadabby and Blögg would quote "He's gone again."
He, She and It	Whitney Lee Savage		1978-1979	A series of animated segments featuring a boy, Heathcliff (whose shirt has the word "HE" written on it), a girl, Sheila (whose shirt has the word "SHE" written on it), and a bear, called the "IT" (who has the word "IT" written on its fur). These segments focus on how a common object functions, with Heathcliff and Sheila giving silly explanations before the IT talks about how the object really works.
Hero Guy		David Rudman	2000-2007	Baby Bear's imaginary superhero friend brought to life by Baby Bear who draws a picture of him and sings his theme song. After springing to life as an animated character, he and Baby Bear embark on adventures together, but face unexpected challenges. Fortunately, Hero Guy never fails to save the day. Like Baby Bear, he is also a bear. His voice is nearly identical to Baby Bear's, which is perhaps to be expected given his status as Baby Bear's creation.
Jake	Buzzco Associates	Jim Thurman	1988	A green snake who demonstrates body parts.
Jasper and Julius	Cliff Roberts	Julius: Jim Thurman; Jasper: ?	1972	Animated comedy duo that formerly appeared in a comic strip by Cliff Roberts. Julius is short, squat, and wears a hat; Jasper is tall and thin.
Joker	Filmation	Casey Kasem	1970	An animated version of the DC Comics character who appeared in Sesame Street's first season.
Jughead	Filmation	Howard Morris	1971	A comic strip character from the Archie Comics who demonstrates a story about himself with words beginning with the letter J.
King Minus	Jeff Hale		1972	A parody of King Midas, who touches everything and makes it disappear, like magic subtraction; he demonstrates his ability with four dragons, in order to get into a castle and meet a fair maiden (who, alas, also disappears by his touch).
King of Eight	Jim Henson	Jim Henson	1971	A king, in a stop-motion animated short created by Jim Henson, who thought "8 is great".
Krazy Kat	King Features Syndicate		1974	An animated segment in which the comic strip character demonstrates the word LOVE by delivering a huge block of cheese to (or rather, on top of) his friend Ignatz Mouse; Ignatz later carves out the word "LOVE" from the cheese block.
The Lecture Lady	Joey Ahlbum	Andrea Martin	1998–2009	A woman in Elmo's World who originally looked and sounded like Edith Prickley from SCTV. In later episodes, she sounded more like Mrs. Falbo. She appeared on every channel on Elmo's TV during the Elmo's World segments which taught Elmo more about the subject.
Lillian	Craig Bartlett		1990	A young girl who talks about her parents bringing a baby sister into her home. Created by Craig Bartlett, in the same medium (clay-animation) as his character Arnold.
Luxo Jr.	John Lasseter		1991	An animated moving lamp created by John Lasseter from Pixar Animation Studios.
Martian Beauty	Bud Luckey		1971	A female martian with 9 hairs on her head (all tied up with "ribbons of red"), 9 eyes, 9 nostrils, 9 arms and 9 toes (on a single foot). Lyrics sung by Turk Murphy
Marty	Craig Bartlett	Martin P. Robinson	1986	A blue chair with bad vision keeps on bumping into things, until he finds his eyeglasses. He grabs a book and waves at us as he says "See ya later!" before exiting his home.
Marvelous Martha			1969	A girl who knows words that begin with "M".
Mrs. Sparklenose	Peter de Sève	Jessica Stone	2009–present	A fairy who is Abby Cadabby, Blögg, and Gonnigan's teacher in the animated segment Abby's Flying Fairy School.
Nancy	Tee Collins		1971	A young nanny goat who makes a "nincompoop" of herself by nibbling on her nails & noticing noodles.
Niblet	Peter de Sève	Tyler Bunch	2009	A Gerbilcorn (a gerbil that has a unicorn horn) who is the class pet in the animated segment Abby's Flying Fairy School.
Noodles & Nedd	John R. Dilworth		1997	A series of animated segments, which involved pantomime slapstick, featuring an eccentric man named Nedd, and his somewhat more intelligent cat named Noodles.
Number Guy	Loring Doyle	Jerry Nelson, Matt Vogel	1991	A man sitting on a chair playing guitar, asking how many of a specific animal would perform a task, to the tune of Blowin' in the Wind by Bob Dylan.
Operatic Orange	Jim Henson		1971	A stop-motion animated orange who sings "Habanera" from Carmen. Created by Jim Henson.
Peck	Peter de Sève	Tyler Bunch	2009	A fairy chicken who appears in minor roles in the animated segment Abby's Flying Fairy School.
Pink Panther	Friz Freleng		1971	An animated segment featuring the Pink Panther demonstrating karate making the Letter K out of huge block of stone.
Pronunciation Guy (or Sign Man)		Don Arioli	1978	An animated guy, looking a lot like Mr. Boffo, who is always coming across a sign with a word that is either jumbled up or separated, and he goes about making it right and trying to pronounce it. Occasionally the sign has two words on it spelled correctly and he just goes about trying to pronounce it. Once he pronounces it right in triumph, something funny happens afterwards relating to the sign.
The Ringmaster	Jeff Hale		1979-1980	An animated circus ringmaster who, with the swing of his whip, choreographs the change of visual numeric patterns in various groups of animals; in the case of two snakes (from out his own hat), the ringmaster produced a saxophone.
Robin	Filmation	Casey Kasem	1970	An animated version of the DC Comics character who appeared in Sesame Street's first season.
Rocket countdown announcer	Floyd Norman		1968-69	An announcer who counted down from 10 to 1 for a rocket launch, with spectators watching from behind. The launch was frequently beset by failure (falling over, spouting water, premature take-off, or either the announcer or spectators blasting off themselves).
Sand dragon		Stephanie D'Abruzzo	2002	A sand-animated green-spined fire-breathing dragon who appeared at the end of the stop-motion animated sand drawing quiz segment in the 2002 video, Elmo Visits the Firehouse to provide fire in order to help demonstrate how firefighters do their jobs. Its only line is "Thanks... for the drink."
The Simpsons	Matt Groening	Dan Castellaneta, Julie Kavner, Nancy Cartwright and Yeardley Smith	1991	The Simpsons family (Homer, Marge, Bart, Lisa and Maggie) made a surprise cameo appearance inside the picture frame among many celebrities in the celebrity version of "Monster in the Mirror" singing "Wubba Wubba!" In the end of that segment, Bart Simpson said "Hey! Wubba, Man!" to Grover.
Smart Susie Sunset	Ray Favata		1978-1979	sidekick to Billy Jo Jive, kid detective.
Solomon Grundy			1969	Washes one part of himself each day, and still winds up half dirty by the end of the week. Appeared in the premiere episode of Sesame Street.
Sparky	Len Glasser	Len Glasser	1981	A white dog who keeps his owner Gerald awake, dances, sings and pretends to be an alligator whenever Gerald's parents close the door.
Spot	Peter de Sève	Leslie Carrara-Rudolph	2009	A spot who is the class pet in the animated segment Abby's Flying Fairy School. Whenever the students have a problem, they call on Spot for an answer. They tell him "Fetch, Spot. Fetch!" The answer is shown inside him as a series of brief videos. He has dog-like behaviors such as barking and licking the students uncontrollably.
Superman	Filmation	Bud Collyer / Lennie Weinrib	1969-1970	An animated version of the DC Comics character who appeared in two animated inserts (test show #1, voiced by Bud Collyer, and episode #184, voiced by Lennie Weinrib)
Suzie Kabloozie	Mo Willems	Ruth Buzzi	1994–2002	A young girl who appeared in many Sesame Street inserts by Mo Willems.
Sweet Adeline	Maurice Sendak	Maddie Page	1971	Bumble Ardy's "put upon mom" in the series of short animations created by Maurice Sendak. Writer Louise A. Gikow further describes her as "sweet but addled".
Teeny Little Super Guy	Paul Fierlinger	Jim Thurman	1982	A typical problem solver created by Paul Fierlinger, this adult human character and his tiny kid friends lived in a live-action, regular sized kitchen setting, in which their traditionally animated 2-dimensional images existed on plastic cups, allowing them to interact with their environment stop-motion style, and deal with problems likewise.
Thelma Thumb	John Korty	Judith Kahan	1978-1979	The secret alter-ego of Marcia Middlewell, a seemingly average girl. Whenever impending trouble was afoot, Marcia would use her magic phrase, "Zapper jiffy squincher scrum, make me into Thelma Thumb!" to shrink down to a salt-shaker-sized superhero, who could fly to the rescue. Her size of choice enabled her to examine objects and places from a unique perspective.
TJ and Bernie the Dog	Magnetic Dreams		2004–2010	
The Three Little Pigs		Various actors	2002 & 2007	Stop-motion paper-animated variations of the characters of the same name, who are shown being saved from house fires by the Big Bad Wolf, in a firefighter's gear, as he sings "Get Out, Stay Out! Don't You Go Back In!", a song about fire safety, and what you should do if there's a fire in your house, in an animated music video segment used in the 2002 video Elmo Visits the Firehouse. The same music video segment was later reused in Episode 4145 in 2007.
Tiger	King Features Syndicate		1973	An animated version of the comic strip character, explaining to young viewers the concept of "school" (and how to write the word).
The Typewriter Guy	Jeff Hale		1975–1976; 1990s	An animated typewriter (with eyes, arms and wheels) who demonstrates letters of the alphabet by typing them out on his paper feed, then spelling out a word describing an object or action revealing itself. He also appears in Sesame Street: Old School, Volume 2, in which each episode features a special introduction by the Typewriter. He is known for his famous sung phrase, "Nooney-Nooney-Noo."
Uncle Edgar	Buzzco Associates		1987	A banjo-playing turtle who performs songs that he and the kids would easily sing. Animated by Buzzco Associates.
Velvet		Leslie Carrara-Rudolph	2012	A computer-animated front curtain that appears in the Elmo: The Musical segments.
Wanda	Tee Collins		1969	A witch who demonstrated several uses of the letter "W". Appeared in the first episode of Sesame Street. Comedian Carol Burnett would often appear after Wanda's segment and state, "Wow, Wanda the Witch is weird!"
Willie Wimple	Abe Levitow		1973	A careless, destructive youth who would throw garbage, chop down trees, and leak oil into the waters, with the jaunty "Flora Song" in the background. The chorus always pointed out how "if every kid did it, can't you see what an icky, messy, no-fun world it would be (yuck)," typically ending with a shot of a ruined earth. Willie's purpose was to demonstrate how one person's actions can harm the planet, since in fact individuals are seldom alone in their waste.
The Yakity Yak	Al Jarnow		1971	A talkative yak repeatedly lecturing about the words "yak," "you" and "yes" all beginning with "Y." After he is called a "yakity yakity yak," the yak goes nuts and charges toward the camera with frenzied eyes, smashing the screen. (Later reruns of this segment in the late 1990s modified the ending so the glass would shatter to reveal the next segment instead of a black screen.)
Zork	Mike Christy (aka ArtistMike)		1990	A green alien who lands on Earth and meets various people & animals (slick agent in California, kangaroo in Australia, etc.)
