= Square One Television =

American children's television program

- The Square One logo
- Starring: Reg E. Cathey; Larry Cedar; Cynthia Darlow; Toni DiBuono (1991–1992); Cristobal Franco; Arthur Howard; Joe Howard; Beverly Leech (1987–1990); Luisa Leschin (1987–1992); Priscilla Lopez (1992); Beverly Mickins
- Voices of: Bob Arbogast; Joan Gerber; Gene Moss; Gary Owens; Jim Thurman
- Narrated by: Cynthia Darlow
- Country of origin: United States
- No. of episodes: 230

Production
- Running time: 30 minutes
- Production company: Children's Television Workshop

Original release
- Network: PBS
- Release: January 26, 1987 – November 6, 1992

Square One Television (sometimes referred to as Square One or Square One TV) is an American children's television program produced by the Children's Television Workshop (now known as Sesame Workshop), with a mathematics theme.

The program was created and broadcast by PBS in the United States from January 26, 1987 to November 6, 1992. After the last episode aired, the show went into reruns until October 7, 1994. The show was revived for the 1995–96 PBS season as a teacher instruction program, Square One TV Math Talk.

From 1999 to 2003, Square One was shown in reruns on Noggin, a cable channel co-founded by Sesame Workshop.

== Development ==
Tom Lehrer, who had written several songs for Children's Television Workshop's previous series The Electric Company, recalled that in 1985, CTW approached him to compose a theme song for a proposed series That's Mathematics. Lehrer obliged, penning lyrics for a series using the melody of Arthur Schwartz's tune for the song "That's Entertainment!" Schwartz's estate and other interests in that song's trademarks and copyrights refused CTW permission to use the song or name, forcing the company back to "square one." (Lehrer would salvage the lyrics and compose a metrically compatible sound-alike melody for his proposed theme.)

The show was intended to address the math crisis among American schoolchildren and to teach mathematics and new abstract mathematical concepts to young viewers.

== Format ==
=== Sketches ===
Square One comprised short sketches that introduced and applied concepts in mathematics such as counting, combinatorics, simple fractions, estimation, probability, and geometry. The sketches featured regular characters and were mainly parodies of pop culture icons, popular television commercials or popular television shows. Sketches were presented in various formats, including music videos featuring a particular subject in mathematics and taught the subject through song (e.g., Roman numerals, obtuse and acute angles, percentages, negative numbers, etc.) or comedic sketches (e.g., General Mathpital, a parody of General Hospital; Nobody's Inn, a parody of Fawlty Towers; Late Afternoon with David Numberman, a parody of Late Night with David Letterman, I Love Lupy, a parody of I Love Lucy, The Phoneymooners, a parody of The Honeymooners; etc.). "Patterns", a polka about patterns that can be detected in daily life, was performed by "Weird Al" Yankovic. Since Yankovic did not write this song, it is unavailable on any of his records, though bootleg versions have circulated. The Judds appeared on Square One Television many times, as they performed various songs.

Mathcourt was a regular segment that parodied television shows of the day set in courtrooms, presided by Judge Sandra Day O'Crater (played by Cynthia Darlow), who showed zero tolerance for unacceptable behavior from the audiences (and the announcer, with the judge sometimes not knowing who it was), frequently telling the gallery she'd have them do time or punish them in another extreme way if they didn't shut up and stop the interruptions (she even threatened to have them all hanged on one occasion). In all cases, a district attorney was prosecuting a defendant for a math crime the defendant did not commit. The judge was sometimes quick to issue a verdict, but in the end always ruled the defendant innocent after the defendant was able to prove it, leaving the district attorney very embarrassed.

Mathman was a regular segment as a parody of Pac-Man. The skit helped viewers learn to recognize common mistakes while solving math problems, such as forgetting to carry a digit, or making errors with negative numbers. A blue tornado character named "Mr. Glitch", a parody of the Ghosts, was Mathman's enemy and would eat him if he got the wrong answers.

Pauline's Perilous Pyramid was another sketch that spoofed arcade games. The heroine Pauline would jump around a pyramid similar to the one used in the game Q*bert. Each square had either a positive or negative number on it. Her objective was to get to the very top of the pyramid, keeping the total of the squares she landed on between 25 and -25.

Backstage with Blackstone featured math-related magic tricks and performances by Harry Blackstone, Jr. Each segment involved two cast members at a time (either Larry Cedar and Cynthia Darlow, Cris Franco and Luisa Leschin or Arthur Howard and Beverly Mickins; Reg E. Cathey portrayed Blackstone's assistant). After performing a trick, Blackstone explained how the trick worked.

Other animated segments included The Further Adventures of Zook & Alison; and Fax Headful, a parody of Max Headroom.

=== Game shows ===
Several segments featured child contestants competing to win prizes.

- But Who's Adding?/But Who's Multiplying?: the show's first original game, hosted by Larry Cedar. Two players captured spaces on a gameboard by adding or multiplying two digits at a time, trying to be the first to complete a row/column/diagonal of three squares in their assigned color.
- But Who's Counting?: hosted by Monty Carlo (played by Arthur Howard), with Reg E. Cathey as announcer. Two pairs of players (mainly Cynthia Darlow and Cris Franco vs. Larry Cedar and Luisa Leschin, except for one episode in which real kids were the contestants; season 1)/two players (seasons 3-4) (played by the cast members) tried to make the smallest/largest five-digit number possible (seasons 1 and 3), smallest/largest pair of fractions in season 4, placing one digit at a time as it was spun on a carnival wheel. Also in season 1, Beverly Mickins played assistant Amber Jeannette.
- Piece of the Pie (Introduced in season 2, lasted until season 4): a survey-based game similar to Family Feud, using pie charts and teaching percentages. The game was hosted by Cris Franco in seasons 2 and 3, (with Arthur Howard as co-host in season 2) who was replaced by Beverly Mickins in season 4. The set was designed like a hole-in-the-wall pie shop for Season 2, and in Seasons 3 and 4, it was designed like a diner.
- Close Call: a game about estimation, using "how many beans are in this big jar"-type of questions, and bearing a similarity to The Price Is Right. Arthur Howard was the original host, replaced at the beginning of Season 4 by Luisa Leschin (who was co-host the previous season). Leschin's co-host was Reg E. Cathey. The game was originally played as a direct-knockout tournament; it was later changed to a game played for points.
- Triple Play: players spun wheels to choose two digits, then had to add/multiply them in order to match numbers on the gameboard, trying to complete a triangle. The game was hosted by Cynthia Darlow, and only lasted one season (Season 2).
- Square One Squares: a tic-tac-toe game similar to Hollywood Squares and To Tell the Truth. The game was later replaced by Square One Challenge, which was played for points, but kept the correct/bluffing elements of Hollywood Squares and To Tell the Truth. Both were hosted by Larry Cedar.

All game shows featured Reg E. Cathey as announcer, except for But Who's Adding/But Who's Multiplying?, which had Cynthia Darlow announcing.

Season 5 did not feature any game show segments.

== Episodes ==
=== Season 1 ===
| No. | Title | Original release date |
|---|---|---|
| 1 | "101" | January 26, 1987 |
Infinity, Mathman, "The Square Brothers", Bureau of Missing Numbers, Mathnet
| 2 | "102" | January 27, 1987 |
American Blandstand, "The Rappin' Judge", Backstage with Blackstone, Tilley's, Mathnet
| 3 | "103" | January 28, 1987 |
The Adventures of Spade Parade, Mathman, Less than Zero, But Who's Counting?, Mathnet
| 4 | "104" | January 29, 1987 |
"The Mathematics of Love", Frank Lloyd Wrong, The Shoemaker and the Elves, Comedy Right Now!, Mathnet
| 5 | "105" | January 30, 1987 |
Percents, What Do More Quacks Recommend?, But Who's Counting?, Mathnet
| 6 | "106" | February 2, 1987 |
Sir Guy vs. Robin, Cabot and Marshmallow, Person on the Street, But Who's Counting?, "Angle Dance", Mathnet
| 7 | "107" | February 3, 1987 |
Zero's Identity Crisis, "8% of my Love", Harry's Hamburger Haven, Cartablanca, Mathnet
| 8 | "108" | February 4, 1987 |
Suds, Cabot and Marshmallow, Country & Western Music Duo, "Tessellation", But Who's Multiplying?, Mathman, Mathnet
| 9 | "109" | February 5, 1987 |
The Phoneymooners, Backstage with Blackstone, "Sign of the Times", Mathman, Mathnet
| 10 | "110" | February 6, 1987 |
The Adventures of Superguy, The Misteaks, Ice Cream Store, Mathnet
| 11 | "111" | February 9, 1987 |
Cabot and Marshmallow, Wheel o'Chance, "Ghost of a Chance", Wild Wild World of Sports You've Never Heard Of, Backstage with Blackstone, Mathnet
| 12 | "112" | February 10, 1987 |
The Paper Race, "Burger Pattern" (The Fat Boys), But Who's Counting?, Mathnet
| 13 | "113" | February 11, 1987 |
Samurai Mathematician, 40% Diet Drink, Mathman, Good Sports, Mathnet
| 14 | "114" | February 12, 1987 |
Cabot and Marshmallow, Whither Weather, "Square Song", Person on the Street, Backstage with Blackstone, In Search of the Giant Squid, Mathnet
| 15 | "115" | February 13, 1987 |
Daddy Knows Different, "Apple Rap", But Who's Counting?, Mathnet
| 16 | "116" | February 16, 1987 |
I Love Lupy, "Rhythm", Mathman, Backstage with Blackstone, Mathnet
| 17 | "117" | February 17, 1987 |
Bandanas, The Math Mimes, "Superspy", But Who's Adding?, Mathnet
| 18 | "118" | February 18, 1987 |
"Perfect Squares", Masterworks Theatre presents The Trojan Pie, The Groaning Wall, But Who's Multiplying?, Mathnet
| 19 | "119" | February 19, 1987 |
Round Off!, Cabot and Marshmallow, "Round It Off", Backstage with Blackstone, Mathnet
| 20 | "120" | February 20, 1987 |
Callous, Bureau of Missing Numbers, Le Prime Club, Mathman, Mathnet

=== Season 2 ===
| No. | Title | Original release date |
|---|---|---|
| 76 | "201" | September 19, 1988 |
Square One Squares, The Math Brigade, "One Billion Is Big" (The Fat Boys), Mathnet
| 77 | "202" | September 20, 1988 |
The Math Brigade, "Estimation", Close Call, Mathman, Mathnet
| 78 | "203" | September 21, 1988 |
Backstage with Blackstone, The Math Brigade, Piece of the Pie, "Combo Jombo", Mathman, Mathnet
| 79 | "204" | September 22, 1988 |
Triple Play, The Math Brigade, Mathnet
| 80 | "205" | September 23, 1988 |
Math Brigade, Mathman, Backstage with Blackstone, Combinatorics (Dweezil Zappa), "Time Keeper" (Tempestt Bledsoe), Mathnet
| 81 | "206" | September 26, 1988 |
Math Brigade, Mathman, Close Call, "Prime Numbers", Mathnet
| 82 | "207" | September 27, 1988 |
Math Brigade, Backstage with Blackstone, Square One Squares, Mathman, Mathnet
| 83 | "208" | September 28, 1988 |
Triple Play, Math Brigade, Common Multiple Man, Mathman, "Archimedes", Mathnet
| 84 | "209" | September 29, 1988 |
Math Brigade, "Count on It", Spot the Hexagons, Piece of the Pie, Cabot and Marshmallow, Mathnet
| 85 | "210" | September 30, 1988 |
Math Brigade, Backstage with Blackstone, International House of Bologna, Mathman, Mathnet

== "Mathman" ==
"Mathman" is a video game segment on Square One TV.

=== Segment format ===
A parody of Pac-Man, "Mathman" was a fictional arcade game starring a character of the same name. "Mathman"'s objective was to run around a Pac-Man-like maze board (the traditional dots were replaced with + and - signs) and eventually encounter a number or polygon. He would then have until the count of three to determine if that number/polygon was consistent with a given category (see examples below), and if so, eat it. If he made a mistake, his enemy Mr. Glitch (a parody of the multi-colored Ghost enemies of Pac-Man) would eat him, ending the game.

If Mathman was able to eat all the correct numbers/polygons, he was awarded a free game. However, Mathman accomplished this feat only a handful of times (i.e., "Multiples of 3," "Factors of 24," "Symmetrical Polygons," "Rectangles" and "Fractions Greater than 1"). On at least one such occasion, a giant Mr. Glitch ate Mathman as soon as the free game began.

During season 4, the format of the game was changed so that Mathman would have to decide if a certain statement (read aloud by the game's announcer) was true or false, and then eat the letter T or F. He would then have until the count of seven to make his decision. These were usually general-knowledge statements about math (e.g., "True or False? Mathematics and arithmetic are the same thing") rather than questions that required actual problem-solving skills. He had until the count of seven to make a decision in this version, but sometimes lost because he wasted too much time explaining his rationale for his decision before making it. Usually two or three correct answers would win a free game.

Occasionally, Mathman did not play the game himself, making Mr. Glitch the contestant. If he answered incorrectly, he would be eaten by Mathman (or on one occasion, Mathman's dog Mathdog). On one occasion, Mr. Glitch got away with an incorrect answer, but on the second incorrect answer, he was eaten by a giant Mathman.

==== Common categories ====
- Polygons (e.g., symmetrical polygons, pentagons, etc.)
- Multiples or factors of a certain number
- Inequalities (involving either numbers or formulae)
- Even numbers or odd numbers
- True or false questions

=== Characters ===
==== Mathman ====
Mathman was a green, Pac-Man-like character with a big mouth, a winged football helmet (patterned after that of the University of Michigan Wolverines, as a significant number of the show's staff were U-M alumni), and a single foot on which he walked around the game maze. When he moved around the maze, he would repeat the phrase "Mathman, Mathman, Mathman," similar to Pac-Man's familiar "wakka-wakka-wakka". In a few episodes, Mathman was delayed arriving at the beginning so The Announcer gave the mission to Mr. Glitch. Mathman arrived later in Mr. Glitch's role as the nemesis.

==== Mathdog ====
Mathdog was Mathman's flatulent pet dog and wore a football helmet like that of Mathman. When he went around the maze, he would say "Mathdog, Mathdog, Mathdog."

==== Mr. Glitch ====
Mathman's nemesis was Mr. Glitch, a cranky tornado who was always described with a different negative adjective. He was a parody of the multi-colored Ghost enemies of Pac-Man and would appear whenever Mathman had to make a decision. If Mathman ate an incorrect number or polygon, answered a question incorrectly, or used up too much time, Mr. Glitch would "power up" (with lightning bolts and thunder crashing), chase after Mathman, and then eat him. He won this right the majority of the times the game was played, only being defeated a handful of times. Mr. Glitch took over Mathman's role in a few episodes when Mathman was delayed arriving at the beginning.

==== The Announcer ====
At the beginning of each sketch, an off-screen voice told either Mathman or Mr. Glitch what his mission would be. Then, a warning was issued to the playing character stating "He will eat you if you are wrong." He also congratulated Mathman and awarded him a free game if he finished the game perfectly.

== Dirk Niblick of the Math Brigade ==
The "Dirk Niblick of the Math Brigade" segment was an animated cartoon.

The title character, Lt. Dirk Niblick, is tasked in each segment with helping friends through practical dilemmas through the use of mathematics. Episodes frequently center on outsmarting scam artists who use deceptive language to attempt to trick the protagonists out of money or property. Most episodes also feature Dirk having one or more telephone conversations with his mother. Supporting characters on the show include Dirk's two young friends, the brother-and-sister pair Fluff and Fold Noodleman, and Dirk's neighbor, Mr. Beasley. The Dirk Niblick segments are similar in appearance to the 1965 cartoon Roger Ramjet; Fred Crippen animated for both, and Gary Owens voiced both title characters.

=== Cast ===
- Gary Owens – Dirk Niblick
- Bob Arbogast – Mr. Wallace C. Beasley, additional voices
- Joan Gerber – Fluff Noodleman, additional voices
- Gene Moss – Fold Noodleman, additional voices
- Jim Thurman – additional voices

== Music videos ==
Square One Television featured at least one music video per episode. They were original songs and featured popular artists such as Kid 'n Play and The Fat Boys. The series reran over 20 videos over 7 seasons.

== Mathnet ==
Each episode featured a closing segment titled Mathnet, starring Joe Howard as George Frankly and Beverly Leech as Kate Monday. A parody of Dragnet, the storyline of each skit featured the detectives attempting to solve a crime by using math. Each Mathnet story line spanned five episodes, or one complete broadcast week (Monday through Friday). Originally set in Los Angeles, the skit was later moved to New York City.

Leech left the show after the third season; she was replaced by Toni DiBuono, playing Pat Tuesday.

== International broadcast ==
- United States
  - PBS
- United Arab Emirates
  - Dubai 33
- Kuwait
  - KTV2
- Saudi Arabia
  - Saudi 2
- Hong Kong
  - TVB Pearl
- Jordan
  - Channel 2
- Zimbabwe
  - ZBC TV
- Canada
  - CBC
- Philippines
  - I Channel
- Australia
  - ABC TV
- New Zealand
  - TVNZ 2
