= Betsy's Kindergarten Adventures =

American animated series by Polka Dot Productions

- Genre: Children's
- Created by: Betsy M. Quinn
- Developed by: Michael Pietrzak (co-creator)
- Directed by: Fred Crippen
- Voices of: Daveigh Chase; Nancy Cartwright; Richard Steven Horvitz; Vicki Lewis; Cree Summer; Sally Struthers; Fred Willard; Tom Bosley; Bess Armstrong
- Music by: Craig Dobbin; Brian Mann
- Opening theme: "Betsy's Kindergarten Adventures"
- Country of origin: United States
- Original language: English
- No. of seasons: 1
- No. of episodes: 26 (2 unaired)

Production
- Executive producers: Dale Scales; Venice Clementi; Reed Clevenger
- Producer: Michael Pietrzak
- Running time: 30 minutes
- Production company: Polka Dot Productions (Note: Animation production by Pantomime Pictures.)

Original release
- Network: PBS Kids
- Release: January 12 – September 27, 2008

Betsy's Kindergarten Adventures is an American animated television series intended for preschoolers aged 2-7. The show aired on PBS Kids from January 12, 2008 to September 27, 2008.

== Premise ==
The show follows a five-year-old girl named Betsy as she starts her school days. The show's grand premiere episode shows Betsy facing the uncertainty of her first day of school and the adjustments she must make as she meets her new teacher and classmates, encounters unfamiliar rules and routines, and finds herself in an entirely new environment. Subsequent episodes focus on Betsy's excitement and sense of adventure as she adjusts to the new experiences of kindergarten.

== Characters ==
- Betsy (voiced by Daveigh Chase) is a five-year-old girl who is the titular main protagonist of the show.
- Billy (voiced by Nancy Cartwright) is Betsy's best friend, who enjoys playing in the dirt.
- Scott (voiced by Richard Steven Horvitz) is a smart boy with glasses who is very interested in science.
- Molly (voiced by Vicki Lewis) is an elitist girl.
- Sarah (voiced by Cree Summer) is an African-American girl who likes sports.
- Kenji (also voiced by Nancy Cartwright) is an intelligent boy of Japanese descent who enjoys dancing.
- Maria (also voiced by Cree Summer) is a quiet girl of Cuban descent who liked all of art. She wishes to be an actress when she grows up.
- Newton (also voiced by Richard Steven Horvitz) is a new student whose episode's first episode appearance is in "Newton the New Kid".
- Mrs. O'Connor (voiced by Sally Struthers) is an adult-aged kindergarten teacher.
- Bus Driver Bob (voiced by Fred Willard), the loyal school bus driver.
- Mr. Richard Warner (voiced by Tom Bosley) is a principal at Lakeshore Elementary.
- Kevin (also voiced by Nancy Cartwright) is Betsy's infant brother.
- Betsy's mother (voiced by Bess Armstrong) is a homemaker who takes care of her daughter Betsy and her infant son Kevin. She is a stay-at-home mother and does not seem to have any outside job as of yet, if ever at all.
- Betsy's father (also voiced by Richard Steven Horvitz) is an aircraft pilot who speaks to Betsy in "airplane-talk." He appears to be the family's only breadwinner.
- Farmer Thomas Warner (also voiced by Tom Bosley) is Richard Warner's brother and the owner of the family farms.
- Gracie is Betsy's family's domesticated pet dog.
- Kitty is Betsy's family's domesticated pet cat.
- Sydney is a pet salamander that belongs to Mrs. O'Connor's kindergarten class.

== Episodes ==
No.	Title	Written by	Original release date
1	"How It All Began" "Lost and Found"	Betsy M. Quinn Evelyn A. R. Gabai	January 12, 2008
"How It All Began": Betsy is scared enough on her first day of kindergarten; she doesn't need the responsibility of taking care of the class salamander, Sydney. But when Betsy loses Sydney, and she wants to tell her teacher, Mrs. O’Connor, that she'll try to come back next year for school, her new friends come to her aid, then Betsy takes responsibility and tries to find Sydney. "Lost and Found": Betsy and her classmates visit a local hands-on museum. Betsy's curious friend, Billy, decides to check out another part of the museum that they were forbidden to go to, and both are lost. They quickly learn about why they should never take off without telling an adult, and the rest of the class also learns about how fun where museums and field trips in general can be.
2	"The Farmyard Field Trip" "Betsy's Green Thumb"	Joey D'Auria John Semper	January 19, 2008
"The Farmyard Field Trip": When Mrs. O'Connor's kindergarten class goes on a field trip to a nearby farm, the class learns all about how cows are milked, what types of food the animals eat, and other things about farms. Betsy, though, is embroiled in the mystery of the missing chicks. Every time she goes back to see the cute baby chicks that just hatched, another one disappears. "Betsy's Green Thumb": The whole class visits a nursery and begins to grow their own plants. Betsy's plant, however, is the only one that won't grow. Betsy learns all sorts of different ways to help plants grow, and finally, Betsy's plant blooms into something truly unique after all. She learns never doubt herself and that things that may not look so special may grow into something very beautiful.
3	"Boots, Boots, Boots" "Team Player"	Joey D'Auria Bill Matheny	January 26, 2008
"Boots, Boots, Boots": It's Betsy's turn to be the class "Weather Watcher" for the week, and she's hoping it rains so she can wear those new, animal rain boots that her grandmother sent her. "Team Player": Everyone in the class must show their way to play and get exercise, but Betsy's not sure in which sport or activity she plays best.
4	"Camping Out" "The Tooth Chart"	Michael Mauer Joey D'Auria	February 2, 2008
"Camping Out": Betsy is afraid to go out in her backyard at night, but when her friends are invited over for a camping sleepover, she is forced to face her fears. In the end, Betsy learns that there was nothing to be afraid of, and she also has learned some good lessons about the Solar System. "The Tooth Chart": Betsy discovers that she has a loose tooth. After initially not wanting to lose her baby tooth to make way for an adult tooth, Betsy quickly changes her mind when Mrs. O'Connor announces that everyone who has lost a tooth can put their name on the "tooth chart." Now the tooth is overstaying its welcome. Betsy learns about her ever-changing body and that good nutrition is required to help her bones - and teeth - grow.
5	"The Spy Who Taught Me" "Show and Tell"	Michael Mauer Evelyn A. R. Gabai	February 9, 2008
"The Spy Who Taught Me": Betsy and her classmates suspect Mrs. O’Connor is a spy, so they go on an adventure to find out the truth, only to let their plans go awry. "Show and Tell": It's "Show and Tell" week at school, and Betsy can't decide what she wants to share with the class.
6	"Betsy Buys a Vowel" "Follow These Directions"	Joey D'Auria	February 16, 2008
"Betsy Buys a Vowel": Betsy is excited to play Mrs. O'Connor's spelling game, although she does not want to get stuck with the feared letter "U" - she doesn't think any words contain that letter. After trying to push the letter onto her classmates, she soon realizes that a large number of words contain the letter "U". Betsy learns a lesson not only about spelling, but how to blend vowel and consonant sounds to correctly say different words. "Follow These Directions": Bus Driver Bob is in charge of making pancakes for Lakeshore School's Pancake Breakfast, and he has lost Principal Warner's pancake recipe. Lucky for him, Betsy remembers the directions of her grandmother's pancake recipe. Everyone learns that the skill of following directions is not only important in the classroom, but also in life in general, and for people of any age.
7	"Borrowed Time" "Happy Earth Day"	Michael Ryan Joey D'Auria	February 23, 2008
"Borrowed Time": Betsy and her classmates visit a library and learn how it works. They learn all of the rules and regulations of the library as well. So when Betsy thinks she loses her library book, she fears incoming consequences. "Happy Earth Day": Mrs. O'Connor's class learns all about protecting the environment on "Earth Day". Betsy shows the class how to reuse things that they may think are garbage.
8	"Frisky Business" "Yesterday, Today, and Tomorrow"	Michael Mauer Joey D'Auria	March 1, 2008
"Frisky Business": When Betsy's father's new birdbath decoration turns up missing, everyone suspects their dog, Gracie. But using their five senses, Betsy, Billy, and Molly solve the mystery and discover the true culprit. Everyone learns that guessing isn't as good as facts and that we are innocent until proven guilty. "Yesterday, Today, and Tomorrow": Betsy is worried that no one will be able to come to her birthday party because they all have things to do this week. She isn't sure exactly how everyone's schedule will impact her party, but, fortunately for Betsy, Mrs. O'Connor teaches her all about calendars. She learns how to measure time with a calendar and the proper order of the days of the week.
9	"Tickets, Please" "Have You Got the Time?"	Bill Matheny Joey D'Auria	March 8, 2008
"Tickets, Please": The class puts on a carnival. Betsy and Scott run the Prizes Booth, but Betsy soon has trouble counting the tickets she receives so the other students can claim their prizes. "Have You Got the Time?": Betsy and her mother seem to be late for everything lately. Good thing Mrs. O'Connor teaches Betsy and her class about the concept of time and reading a clock. Betsy soon learns how to use her time more wisely.
10	"Growing, Growing Gone" "The Treasure of the Sierra Betsy"	Bill Matheny Joey D'Auria	March 15, 2008
"Growing, Growing Gone": When the class learns about measurements and begin to measure their growth, Billy worries that he has stopped growing because he hasn't grown any taller in awhile. "The Treasure of the Sierra Betsy": The class learns all about the concept of money. Betsy decides she wants to buy her Mom a hairclip, but she needs to figure out how to get money to buy it.
11	"Introducing the Post Office" "A Berry Sore Stomach"	Joey D'Auria Michael Ryan	March 22, 2008
"Introducing the Post Office": Mrs. O'Connor invites a Postman to the classroom to describe how the Post Office works. Afterwards, the children give out "love day" cards in the classroom just as the Post Office would. "A Berry Sore Stomach": Mrs. O'Connor teaches the class about basic food nutrition. Betsy and Billy decide that they will only eat blueberries, because they taste good and are good for everyone. But after a weekend of nothing but blueberries, the children realize they have to eat well-balanced meals in order to stay healthy.
12	"Lyrtle the Turtle" "The Great Gingerbread Man Mystery"	Betsy M. Quinn Joey D'Auria	March 29, 2008
"Lyrtle the Turtle": Mrs. O'Connor teaches the class about animals. The first featured animal is a turtle. They learn a valuable lesson in responsibility and what it takes to care for pets. "The Great Gingerbread Man Mystery": The children learn to develop an awareness of the world around them as well as development of their imaginations and the ability to recognize landmarks and locations. When their freshly baked "Gingerbread Man" disappears, they need to use all these skills to solve the mystery and find their "Gingerbread Man".
13	"Molly's First Bike Ride" "An Awfully Frightening Lightning"	Bill Matheny Michael Ryan	April 5, 2008
"Molly's First Bike Ride": When the class has a bike parade coming up, Molly admits to Betsy that she doesn't know how to ride a bike. With the help of Kenji and Betsy, Molly finally learns how to ride her bike and stars in the parade. "An Awfully Frightening Lightning": After Kenji says giants are causing the sound of thunder, Betsy and her classmates become extremely scared when a storm comes through. Mrs. O'Connor eases their fears with the truth about thunder and lightning and how it really works.
14	"Newton the New Kid" "A Colorful Encounter"	Joey D'Auria Joie Albrecht	April 12, 2008
"Newton the New Kid": Lakeshore Elementary welcomes a new student from New York City, Newton. But when Newton seems scared and nervous, Betsy takes it on herself to show him around and introduce him to all the students. "A Colorful Encounter": The children need to find "the secret of the primary colors" while making an art project. They cannot decide on what to make, so the children split up into separate groups and make two separate art projects.
15	"A Whole Lotta Hot Air" "The Fire Department"	Michael Ryan Joey D'Auria	July 26, 2008
"A Whole Lotta Hot Air": When Betsy and her friends are playing with helium-filled balloons, Betsy mistakenly thinks her baby sibling floated away. "The Fire Department": Mrs. O'Connor's class visits a local firehouse. On their way back to school, Betsy thinks she sees a fire and reports it.
16	"Responsibilities" "Rules of the Road"	Joey D'Auria	August 2, 2008
"Responsibilities": Mrs. O'Connor teaches the class all about responsibilities. After Billy gets an important responsibility, he thinks he will disrupt the assignment to never get another one again. But after a talk from Betsy, Billy decides to do his best when given a responsibility. "Rules of the Road": After the children misbehave on the bus ride to school, Mrs. O'Connor decides to take them back to Bus Driver Bob to learn the rules they should follow on the bus.
17	"To Tree or Not to Tree" "Something Fishy"	Joey D'Auria Betsy M. Quinn	August 9, 2008
"To Tree or Not to Tree": The children perform a stage play about animals and nature. Betsy is let down when she has to play a tree, but the children make her realize that trees are just as important as anything else, and possibly more important. "Something Fishy": The class visits a local aquarium and learn all about ocean animals. Kenji is extremely scared with all of the animals, as he is unfamiliar with them. But with Betsy's help, Kenji comes to realize there's nothing to be afraid of at the aquarium.
18	"The Police Department" "A Visit from the Doctor"	Joey D'Auria	August 16, 2008
"The Police Department": A police officer visits the class and teaches the students all about what the police do. He also teaches Betsy all about detective work, which she uses to solve the mystery of who stole Kevin's teddy bear. "A Visit from the Doctor": Mrs. O'Connor teaches the class about how to stay healthy and invites Dr. Andersen to class. Betsy realizes that healthy foods are very tasty, too.
19	"Homework Rules" "Bread and Butterflies"	Michael Pietrzak Joey D'Auria	August 23, 2008
"Homework Rules": Betsy is excited when a Super Fun Sandy Mega Play Set is coming out in stores, but Mrs. O'Connor has just given the class homework. Betsy decides the right thing to do is follow the homework rules and finish her work before she goes out and gets the new toy, but it may not be available if she gets to the store too late. "Bread and Butterflies": Mrs. O'Connor brings caterpillars into the class. They learn all about the life cycle of a butterfly and then Mrs. O'Connor lets the class decide what to do with the beautiful butterflies after they're full grown.
20	"All Washed Up" "Mrs. O' Connor's Space Rangers"	Joie Albrecht Joey D'Auria	August 30, 2008
"All Washed Up": The class learns about personal hygiene and germs. Betsy gets a little carried away and learns its best to do everything in moderation. "Mrs. O' Connor's Space Rangers": When the class is learning about space, Mrs. O'Connor takes them on a field trip to visit a planetarium.
21	"Manners Please" "Mystery at Lakeshore Farm"	Betsy M. Quinn Joey D'Auria	September 6, 2008
"Manners Please": The class has to get ready for "Parents Day Tea Party", so they all have to learn how to have proper manners. Molly thinks she knows it all, but actually she seems to have very bad manners. "Mystery at Lakeshore Farm": The class learns about sorting and classifying. Mrs. O'Connor takes the class on a field trip back to Lakeshore Farms where things are disappearing. Betsy and her friends solve the mystery by sorting and classifying.
22	"Big and Little" "Computer Fun"	Joey D'Auria Betsy M. Quinn	September 13, 2008
"Big and Little": The class learn the difference between big and little. Bus Driver Bob thinks his bus has shrunk into a tiny toy bus when someone moves his bus and it is replaced by Newton's toy bus. "Computer Fun": Mrs. O'Connor has a surprise for the class in the library. Computer stations have been set up for everyone! The kids have fun learning the basic instructions on how to use a computer.
23	"Making Instruments" "Dinosaur Dynasty"	Joey D'Auria Betsy M. Quinn	September 20, 2008
"Making Instruments": Betsy has a rare assignment to make her own musical instrument, but everything she thinks of is already taken by another member of the class. During a visit to Lakeshore Zoo, she discovers an instrument with her father's help and the whole class plays a nice medley together. "Dinosaur Dynasty": The class goes on a field trip to a Dinosaur Museum. Not only do they learn about dinosaurs, but also about what a paleontologist does. They have such fun while exploring within the museum digging pit as well as at home, digging up things in the backyard of Betsy's house.
24	"Treasure Hunt" "Betsy in Charge"	Daniel Cieplinski Bill Matheny	September 27, 2008
"Treasure Hunt": The class learn about directions of a map. They learn how to use a compass and nature to complete Mrs. O'Connor exercise to find the treasure. "Betsy in Charge": The class get the chance to really understand what it takes to run the school. They each get a set of responsibilities in different departments. Betsy and Newton are the principals. They each come to realize how much work and responsibility goes into running the school and being an adult.
25	"When I Grow Up" "Tell Me a Story"	Joey D'Auria TBA	Unaired
"When I Grow Up": Betsy is unsure about who she wants to be when she grows up. "Tell Me A Story": The class learns the difference between fiction and non-fiction.
26	"Election Day" "Happy to Be Me"	TBA	Unaired
"Election Day": The class learns about Election Day. Meanwhile, Billy and Sarah want to lead the Election Day parade. "Happy to Be Me": Scott learns about self-confidence, after he feels bad about being the smallest in the class.
