= Linus the Lionhearted =

- 1964 vinyl record
- Genre: Animated; Comedy
- Created by: Ed Graham Jr.
- Developed by: Gene Schinto
- Directed by: Ed Graham Jr.
- Voices of: Sheldon Leonard; Ed Graham Jr. Carl Reiner; Ruth Buzzi; Bob McFadden; Jesse White; Jonathan Winters; Gerry Matthews "Bashful Bigshots"
- Theme music composer: Johnny Mann
- Opening theme: "Roar For Linus"
- Ending theme: "Linus and His Friends Must Go"
- Country of origin: United States
- Original language: English
- No. of seasons: 2
- No. of episodes: 39 (list of episodes)

Production
- Producer: Ed Graham Jr.
- Running time: 30 minutes (with commercials)
- Production companies: Ed Graham Productions; General Foods

Original release
- Network: CBS (B&W); ABC (color)
- Release: September 26, 1964 – December 11, 1965

Linus the Lionhearted is an American Saturday morning animated television series that aired on CBS from September 26, 1964 to December 11, 1965, originally airing in black and white. Color versions of the episodes started airing on CBS in 1965, and continued in reruns on ABC, until September 7, 1969. It was an early Saturday morning cartoon. The show follows a jungle-dwelling lion king who rules from his personal barber's chair.

The character was created in 1959, by the Ed Graham advertising agency, originally as a series of ads for General Foods' Post Cereals. At first, Linus the lion was the spokesman for the short-lived Post cereal "Heart of Oats" (a Cheerios imitation). Eventually, the lion was redesigned and reintroduced in 1963, to sell Crispy Critters, which featured Linus on the box. The ads were so popular that a television series was created in 1964, with General Foods as sponsor. The show ran on the CBS network until 1966, and reruns aired on ABC from 1966 to 1969.

As of September 2025, Linus the Lionhearted airs on MeTV Toons.

== History ==
In addition to Linus, a rather good-natured "King of the Beasts" who ruled from his personal barber's chair and was voiced by Sheldon Leonard, there were other features as well, all based on characters representing other Post breakfast cereals. The best-known of these was Sugar Bear (Sugar Crisp), who sounded like Dean Martin or Bing Crosby and was voiced by actor Gerry Matthews. There was also a postman named Lovable Truly (Alpha-Bits), a young Asian boy named So-Hi (Rice Krinkles), and Rory Raccoon (Post Toasties).

A long-play record album was released as a premium tie-in in the year of the show's debut, featuring the characters (voiced by the same stars as the animated cartoon) singing familiar songs such as "Jimmy Cracked Corn" with rewritten lyrics. A coloring book was also published which detailed the adventures of So-Hi going on a scavenger hunt in order to break a curse on a two-headed bird, who is then transformed into a human boy due to So-Hi's dedication.

== Vocal talent ==
The show was perhaps best noted for its abundance of well-known vocal talent. In addition to Leonard, Carl Reiner voiced several characters, most notably Linus' friend Billy Bird; Ruth Buzzi (later of Rowan & Martin's Laugh-In) voiced an old witch who had befriended Lovable Truly, as well as Sugar Bear's sometime nemesis, Granny Goodwitch; and veteran Bob McFadden voiced So Hi, Rory and Lovable Truly. Jonathan Winters made a number of guest appearances, as did Jerry Stiller and his wife Anne Meara. Also credited was the later "Maytag Repairman," Jesse White.

== End theme ==
As opposed to the cartoon's jaunty, upbeat, fast-paced opening, which promoted "Linus the King, Linus the Star, Linus the Lionhearted," the end theme, likely by the Johnny Mann Singers, was slow and melancholy in tone. As it played, the cartoon's five principal characters—Linus, Lovable Truly, Rory Raccoon, So Hi, and Sugar Bear were depicted loading the series' "props" into a trunk under a spotlight. As the song progressed and with the trunk filled, closed, and now in Linus' hand, the characters, with big tears in their eyes, were all sadly forced to wave goodbye, turned, and faded away into darkness as they walked out of the spotlight. As the song concluded, Billy Bird "mopped up" the white spotlight circle of tears until it faded to black for the week:

"Linus and his friends must go, so we leave you with a song.

We're all kind of sad to part, glad at heart it won't be long.

Lion-hearted friendships don't end, we'll all be back, and then

Linus and his friends will go on with the show again!"

== Broadcast history ==
The series was initially shown every Saturday morning on CBS from fall 1964 to summer 1966, with the series originally being broadcast in black and white until it began broadcasting in color in fall 1965. Beginning in September 1966, weekly reruns of the show would air on ABC, after negotiations to have the series continue to air reruns on CBS failed. During the series' broadcast on ABC, many of the Rory Raccoon segments were dropped from the episodes due to the declining popularity of the Sugar Sparkled Flakes cereal associated with Rory.

An FCC ruling in 1969 forbade children's show characters from appearing in advertisements on the same program. ABC was consequently forced to pull the series' reruns. After the ruling, the series was then distributed for syndication to various local stations without the Post sponsorship and character cereal commercials, where reruns continued to be broadcast until the series completely disappeared from local stations by the early 1980s.

After the show left the local airwaves, Linus continued to appear in balloon form in the Macy's Thanksgiving Day Parade, making his final appearance in 1991.

The series was also exported to Japan under the name "ずこっけライオン大将" (General Zukokke Lion), which it was broadcast on NET (now TV Asahi) from July 21 to September 25, 1969. The Post sponsorship was also removed from broadcast due to Post not having a presence in Japan. One of the Japanese voices was Masashi Amemori.

The series began airing on MeTV Toons in 2025, marking the first broadcast of the show in the United States since local reruns of the series ended in the early 1980s.

== Home media ==
MPI Media Group acquired the rights to the series and will be releasing the restored cartoons on DVD.

== Restored cartoons ==
According to MeTV Toons' listing for Linus the Lionhearted, 40 restored episodes of the series have been packaged for broadcast on that channel which vary from the production schedule of 39 episodes listed in this article.

== Episode list ==
=== Segments ===
- C = The Company (i.e., wraparound segment)- 39 segments
- LK = Linus, King of Beasts- 39 segments
- LT = Lovable Truly- 35 segments
- R = Rory Raccoon, Hometown Hero- 19 segments
- SH = So-Hi- 37 segments
- SB = Sugar Bear- 22 segments

=== Season 1 (1964–65) ===
Nº	Ep	Originally broadcast segments	Air date
1	1	"Mocking Bird" (C) / "The Gallant Grouse" (LK) / "Truly Chewy" (LT) / "Bye, Bye, Bad Bird" (R) / "So-Hi and the Bamboo Stalk" (SH) / "Room for One More" (SB)	September 26, 1964
2	2	"Adrift on the Rapids" (C) / "Swami Bird" (LK) / "Beware of the Dog Catcher" (LT) / "Samples from Mars" (R) / "King Midas" (SH) / "Bad Apple" (SB)	October 3, 1964
3	3	"Linus Plays, Linus Says" (C) / "Rocky Road to Riches" (LK) / "Truly Scarey" (LT) / "Faults of the Toreador" (R) / "Sleeping Beauty" (SH) / "Which Is Witch?" (SB)	October 10, 1964
4	4	"Water Skiing" (C) / "Birds Gotta Swim" (LK) / "It's a Dog's Life" (LT) / "Winter Blunderland" (R) / "The Night Before Christmas" (SH) / "Cry Wolf" (SB)	October 17, 1964
5	5	"Macy's Thanksgiving Day Balloon" (C) / "Hiccups" (LK) / "Frank Pfaff Streetcleaner" (LT) / "Circus Stars" (R) / "So-Hi and the Ugly Duckling" (SH) / "Water, Water, Everywhere" (SB)	October 24, 1964
6	6	"Sugar Bear, Linus Says" (C) / "Hidden Talent" (LK) / "Wrong Dog" (LT) / "Rory Takes a Vacation" (R) / "When So-Hi Called Wolf" (SH) / "Picture Me in Pictures" (SB)	October 31, 1964
7	7	"Cheering of the Grouse" (C) / "Exercise" (LK) / "Dog Gone" (LT) / "Make Someone Happy" (R) / "Casey at the Bat" (SH) / "Stop the Magic" (SB)	November 7, 1964
8	8	"Joke Day" (C) / "A Gift for Linus" (LK) / "Dog Pound" (LT) / "Rory's Circus Act" (R) / "The Bear Who Danced Too Well" (SH) / "Granny's Broom" (SB)	November 14, 1964
9	9	"Hide and Seek" (C) / "Who Am I" (LK) / "One for the Book" (LT) / "World's Worst Caddy" (R) / "The Tortoise and the Hare" (SH) / "A Cake for Benjie" (SB)	November 21, 1964
10	10	"Suggestion Box" (C) / "Help! Save the Mocking Bird!" (LK) / "My Fuzzy Fugitive" (LT) / "Beautiful Baby Contest" (R) / "The Fisherman and the Wishes" (SH)	November 28, 1964
11	11	"Musical Chairs" (C) / "Talking Rock" (LK) / "A Visit to a Toy Store" (LT) / "Vincent Van Crow, Artiste" (R) / "So-Hi and the Knight" (SH)	December 5, 1964
12	12	"National Linus Admirers Day" (C) / "The Reflection Pool" (LK) / "Be Kind to Dogs Week" (LT) / "Big Chief Rain In the Face" (R) / "So-Hi and the Singing King" (SH)	December 12, 1964
13	13	"It's Rhyme Time" (C) / "Flyin' Lion" (LK; Pilot) / "One Way" (LT) / "This Means Total War" (R) / "The Princely Toad" (SH)	December 19, 1964
14	14	"Old Car" (C) / "Linus' Coronation" (LK) / "Making Movies" (LT) / "C. Claudius Dreams" (R) / "The Prince Who Wasn't Charming" (SH)	December 26, 1964
15	15	"Flying High" (C) / "The Birds" (LK) / "Puncture Time" (LT) / "Some Total" (R) / "Little Red So-Hihood" (SH)	January 2, 1965
16	16	"The Picnic" (C) / "Remember the Birds" (LK) / "Flop Flop" (LT) / "Rory Goes Skiing" (R) / "The Giant with Two Glass Jaws" (SH)	January 9, 1965
17	17	"Mountain Climbing" (C) / "Fishing for Relaxation" (LK) / "Ups and Downs" (LT) / "Numbskull and Crossbones" (R) / "The Business-Like Witch" (SH)	January 16, 1965
18	18	"Treasure Hunt" (C) / "Missing—One Throne" (LK) / "What's Up" (LT) / "The World's Greatest Hypnotist" (R) / "The Wolf Who Changed His Spots" (SH)	January 23, 1965
19	19	"Cross Jungle Race" (C) / "Helping Hands" (LK) / "United We Stand" (LT) / "Rest Cured" (R) / "CinderSo-Hi" (SH)	January 30, 1965
20	20	"The Voyage" (C) / "Dinny's Sydney Special" (LK) / "A Visit to Dizzyland" (LT) / "The Too-Particular Princess" (SH)	February 6, 1965
21	21	"The Hand Gernade" (C) / "Travel Is Broadening" (LK) / "Keep Off the Grass" (LT) / "E.R. Jack Rumplestiltskin" (SH)	February 13, 1965
22	22	"The Bicycle" (C) / "Billy's Sydney Special" (LK) / "It's a Bird Dog" (LT) / "The Jester Who Took Himself Serious" (SH)	February 20, 1965
23	23	"The Tank" (C) / "Crocodile Tears" (LK) / "Double Trouble" (LT) / "Huffy Miss Muffet" (SH)	February 27, 1965
24	24	"The Box" (C) / "The Sinking Island" (LK) / "The Flying Dog Catcher" (LT) / "The Walrus and the Carpenter" (SH)	March 6, 1965
25	25	"Coconut Harvest" (C) / "Surprise" (LK) / "The Poet Bandit" (SH)	March 13, 1965
26	26	"The Sky Race" (C) / "That Winning Smile" (LK) / "The Cat Who Looked at a Queen" (SH)	March 20, 1965

=== Season 2 (1965) ===
Nº	Ep	Originally broadcast segments	Air date
27	1	"Underwater" (C) / "Linus to the Rescue" (LK) / "Truly Heroic" (LT) / "Thieves Who Fell Out" (SH) / "Mervyn Meets His Match" (SB)	September 18, 1965
28	2	"The Lost Kingdom" (C) / "Shadow Thief" (LK) / "Truly Explosive" (LT) / "Magic Pig" (SH) / "Benjie, the Apprentice" (SB)	September 25, 1965
29	3	"Hand Car" (C) / "No News Is Good News" (LK) / "The Counterfeiter" (LT) / "Genie Who Got His Wish" (SH) / "Rich Witch" (SB)	October 2, 1965
30	4	"Skateboard" (C) / "Surprise Attack" (LK) / "The Spy" (LT) / "King's Canary" (SH) / "Singing Toad" (SB)	October 9, 1965
31	5	"Albino Gorilla" (C) / "Leaping Lizard" (LK) / "Truly to the Rescue" (LT) / "Twin Witches" (SH) / "Mervyn's Museum" (SB)	October 16, 1965
32	6	"Space Capsule" (C) / "Jungle Rot" (LK) / "Carnival Cars" (LT) / "The Giant Who Liked People and Birds" (SH) / "Benjie's Revenge" (SB)	October 23, 1965
33	7	"Linus Submarine" (C) / "Nephew Norman" (LK) / "Trestle Trouble" (LT) / "The Dragon Who Went Home To His Mother" (SH) / "Mervyn's Genie" (SB)	October 30, 1965
34	8	"The Man Eating Plant" (C) / "The Census" (LK) / "Pony Express Postman" (LT) / "The Scaredy Cat" (SH) / "Trick Banjo" (SB)	November 6, 1965
35	9	"Twin Gorillas" (C) / "Booby Traps" (LK) / "Truly Monstrous" (LT) / "The Fast Sword" (SH) / "Head Over Heels" (SB)	November 13, 1965
36	10	"The Peculiar Tree" (C) / "What's on Third" (LK) / "Playing the Trains" (LT) / "Jolly Roger" (SH) / "Granny's Phone Booth" (SB)	November 20, 1965
37	11	"Ivory Tower" (C) / "Winner and Still King" (LK) / "The Flying Dog" (LT) / "The Princess Who Held On to her Hand" (SH) / "Perilous Picnic" (SB)	November 27, 1965
38	12	"Pre-Historic Perils" (C) / "Around the World in 80 Gags" (LK) / "Mervyn's Elevator" (SB)	December 4, 1965
39	13	"Cool Cousin" (C) / "The Disappearing Act" (LK) / "Mervyn's Songbook" (SB)	December 11, 1965

== Credits ==
=== Season 1 ===
- Supervising Director: Irv Spector
- Production Supervision: Lew Irwin
- Character Models: George Cannata
- Head Writer: Bill Schnurr
- Associate Producer: Rick Herland
- Produced and Directed by Ed Graham, Jr.
- Animation Directors: John Freeman, Clyde Geronimi, Rube Grossman, Ed Rehberg, George Singer, Marvin Woodward, T. Hee
- Layouts: Corny Cole, Bob Dranko, Burt Freund, Dave Hanan, Homer Jonas, Tony Rivera, Sam Weiss, Osmond Evans, Bob Singer, Gerard Baldwin, Fred Crippen, Mordicai Gerstein, Alex Ignatiev, Victor Haboush, Elmer Plummer, Ray Jacobs, Ron Maidenberg, Marty Murphy
- Storyboards: Tom Dagenais, Art Diamond, Bob Givens, Cal Howard, Bob Kurtz, Mike Smollin, Dave Detiege, Jim Mueller, Ken Mundie, Jack Miller
- Backgrounds: Bill Butler, Boris Gorelick, Erv Kaplan, Bob McIntosh, Lorraine Morgan, Curt Perkins
- Editors: Hank Goetzenberg, Jerry MacDonald, George Mahana
- Sound Engineer: Gil Arion
- Ink and Paint by Connie Crawley, Dea Shirley
- Character Layouts: Stan Green
- Special Music Arrangements: Johnny Mann
- Production Assistants: Ruth Kennedy, Armand Shaw
- Animators: Ray Abrams, Frank Andrina, Gerard Baldwin, Tom Baron, Warren Batchelder, Bob Bentley, Dan Bessie, Frank Braxton, Brad Case, Fred Crippen, Jim Davis, Ed Friedman, Bob Goe, Frank Gonzales, Manny Gould, Bill Hajee, Ken Hultgren, Tom McDonald, Dan Mills, Chic Otterstrom, Amby Paliwoda, Manuel Perez, Virgil Ross, Frank Smith, Ed Solomon, Russ von Neida, Ray Young, Rudy Zamora

=== Season 2 ===
- Direction: Gerard Baldwin, Clyde Geronimi, George Singer, Marvin Woodward
- Music: Hoyt Curtin
- Head Writer: Bill Schnurr
- Character Models: George Cannata Jr.
- Production Supervision: Lew Irwin
- Production Assistants: Henry Hof III, Ruth Kennedy, Armand Shaw
- Film Editing: Hank Gotzenberg, George Mahana
- Sound Engineer: Gil Arion
- Inking & Painting: Connie Crawley
- Storyboards: Tom Dagenais, Tom Henderson, Lee Mishkin, Irv Spector
- Layout: Stan Green, Burt Freund, Don Jurwich, Tony Rivera, Sam Weiss
- Animation: Bob Bentley, Ted Bonnicksen, Herm Cohen, Ed Friedman, Bob Goe, Manny Gould, Bill Hajik, Ken Hultgren, Fred Madison, Amby Paliwoda, George Rowley, Ed Solomon, John Walker, Rudy Zamora
- Background: Erv Kaplan, Curt Perkins
- Associate Producer: Rick Herland
- Produced and Directed by Ed Graham Jr.

=== Voices ===
- Carl Reiner - Billy Bird, Dinny Kangaroo, Sasha Grouse, and Crocodile
- Sheldon Leonard - Linus the Lionhearted
- Bob McFadden - So Hi, Rory Raccoon, Lovable Truly, Richard Harry Nearly, Benjie Wolf, and Cousin Zeke
- Gerry Matthews - Sugar Bear
- Jesse White - Claudius Crow
- Ruth Buzzi - Granny Goodwitch
- Paul Frees - various supporting characters
- Ed Graham Jr. - Mockingbird
- "Bashful Bigshots" (various big name guest stars, usually not credited)
  - Jonathan Winters
  - Tom Poston
  - Stiller & Meara- additional voices for the So-Hi cartoons
