= Jim Thurman =

American actor (1935–2007)

- Jim Thurman as the pilot on Sesame Street Goes to Hawaii in 1978.
- Born: James George Thurman; March 13, 1935; Dallas, Texas, United States
- Died: April 14, 2007 (aged 72); Sheffield, Massachusetts, United States
- Education: University of Michigan
- Occupations: Actor; screenwriter; director; producer; cartoonist
- Years active: 1960–2007

James Frederick Thurman (March 13, 1935 – April 14, 2007) was an American actor, screenwriter, and director. He is best known for the writings of TV gags for the likes of Bob Hope, Bob Newhart, Carol Burnett, Bill Cosby, and Dean Martin.

== Career ==
Born in Dallas, Texas but raised in Vicksburg, Michigan, Thurman completed a degree at the University of Michigan. He began his career as a copywriter at various advertising agencies in Los Angeles, and San Francisco. Later he moved to Los Angeles with his writing partner Gene Moss, where they formed a boutique advertising agency, "Creative Advertising Stuff".

Moss and Thurman scripted all 156 installments of the 1965 cartoon series Roger Ramjet as well as the puppet comedy series Shrimpenstein, where Thurman voiced the title character for satirical children's television program.

In 1967 Thurman teamed up with Carol Burnett to begin writing gags for The Carol Burnett Show, scripting running gags and writing whole skits. In 1969, Thurman joined the writing team for Sesame Street, scripting both street and Muppet scenes as well as producing many animated sketches. He also played Digby Dropout's sidekick "Dunce" in The Man from Alphabet, a detective show which appeared in Sesame Street's pilots but was not used in the actual series due to poor testing results.

In 1972, Thurman teamed up with Bob Newhart to begin writing gags for The Bob Newhart Show, scripting both therapy and regular scenes. One year later in 1973 Thurman did the voice of Christopher Clumsy for a Cliff Roberts-produced cartoon about shapes as well as Jake the Snake in 1988 (also for Sesame Street). In 1977 Jim worked as a consultant for Warner Cable's innovation Qube system in Columbus, Ohio. He was on the creative team for the interactive "Columbus Alive" news magazine program. In 1982, Thurman teamed up with Paul Fierlinger to create, write, and voice Teeny Little Super Guy for Sesame Street.

He also wrote sketches for Jim Henson's The Muppet Show in the fourth season. Thurman subsequently worked on most of CTW's other series, as a staff writer and cartoon voiceover on The Electric Company and 3-2-1 Contact, Fat Albert and the Cosby Kids, and as head writer/senior producer for Square One TV; on the later series, he provided the voice of Mr. Glitch and the off-screen announcer for Mathman, scripted the Mathnet segments, and Dirk Niblick of the Math Brigade. Thurman co-created the Math Talk package with Dave Connell, as senior producer. Thurman also wrote for Muppet Babies. In recent years Jim continued to write, do voice work, and also wrote a weekly column for his local paper, the Berkshire Record. Thurman also wrote and voiced several animated sexual education specials for Buzzco Associates, Inc. He has also done voice work for home video releases such as the Richard Scarry Learning videos and the Dr. Seuss Beginner Book Video series. In 1994–95, Thurman voiced the worm and wrote a few Dr. Seuss stories in Playtoons series. In 2006, he wrote wraparound material and voiced Bob for the Old School Volume 1 DVD. Also in 2006, he wrote Books by You. In 2007, he last voiced SingStar POP Bundle on April 3 (so you can use your microphone).

He died in Sheffield, Massachusetts after a brief illness on April 14, 2007, one month after his 72nd birthday.

== Filmography ==
- Roger Ramjet (1965) (also writer)
- Shrimpenstein (1965)
- The Man from Alphabet (1969)
- Christopher Clumsy (1973)
- Out to Lunch (1974) (also writer)
- The Jean Marsh Cartoon Special (1975) (also writer)
- A Walking Tour of Sesame Street (1979) (also writer)
- Teeny Little Super Guy (1982) (also writer)
- Dirk Niblick of the Math Brigade (1987) (also writer)
- Jake the Snake (1988)
- The Quitter (1988) (also writer)
- P. D. Eastman: Are You My Mother? (1991) (also writer)
- Marsupilami (1993) (as the three baby monkeys in "Hey, Hey, They're the Monkeys!")

== Television work ==
- Sesame Street (also writer 1969–2007)
- The Electric Company (also writer 1971–1977)
- The Bob Newhart Show (also writer 1972–1978)
- Fat Albert and the Cosby Kids (also writer 1972–1984)
- The Muppet Show (also writer 1976–1981)
- 3-2-1 Contact (also writer 1980–1988)
- Muppet Babies (also writer 1984–1991)
- Square One TV (also writer 1987–1992)
- Mathnet (also writer 1987–1992)
- Turkey Television (voice actor 1985–1986)

== Home video work ==
- Best ABC Video Ever! (1989)
- Best Counting Video Ever! (1989)
- Dr. Seuss Beginner Book Video (1989–1997)
- Sing Yourself Silly! (1990)
