= Amby Paliwoda =

American animator (1909–1999)

Ambrozi "Amby" Paliwoda (December 20, 1909 – June 9, 1999) was an American animator, character designer, and layout artist, best known for his extensive work with Walt Disney Animation Studios. He contributed to numerous classic films, including Snow White and the Seven Dwarfs (1937), Fantasia (1940), Cinderella (1950), and Sleeping Beauty (1959).

== Early life and education ==
An American of Ukrainian descent, Paliwoda grew up in the Tremont neighborhood of Cleveland, Ohio.

Paliwoda graduated with honors from the Cleveland Institute of Art. He contributed a painting, Out of the Past, the Present, Out of the Material, the Spiritual, to the Cleveland Public Library's Jefferson branch through the Works Progress Administration arts program. He spent the next year touring Europe on an art scholarship.

== Work with Disney Studios ==
Paliwoda moved to Los Angeles in 1935. His first job there was painting nudes on the ceiling of a restaurant. He applied for a job at Disney in Hollywood. Although there was great competition for jobs at Disney, he was hired by Don Graham, who had taught at the Cleveland Institute of Art, because of his fine arts background. The studio had begun work on Snow White which needed more realism, and thus knowledge of bodies and movement, than earlier cartoons. He worked from 1935 to 1960 at Walt Disney Studios, first as an assistant animator and later as an animator. His first film work was on Snow White and the Seven Dwarves (1937).

== World War II ==
Paliwoda served in the United States military during World War II. After completing Basic training at Fort Dix, N.J., he was assigned to the Tank Destroyers at Fort Hood, TX, where he designed the famous "Black Panther" Tank Destroyers Shoulder Patch. Because of his artistic background, he was later transferred to the Signal Corps, where he was assigned to the Training Films Unit located in Culver City, CA, to help produce animated segments of U.S. Army training films. He trained with the Signal Corps and worked on Army training films. In his leisure time, played Gin Rummy with Fess Parker and Jeff York, and played chess with Milt Kahl.

== Later cartoon work ==
After leaving Disney, Paliwoda worked for other studios, including Hanna-Barbera, Format Films, Ed Graham Productions, Filmation, Bakshi-Krantz, Fred Calvert, Sanrio, and Duck Soup Producktions. He was the supervising animator on Bill Cosby's Fat Albert and the Cosby Kids. At Duck Soup Producktions he worked primarily on animated advertisements for products such as Levi jeans and Froot Loops cereal.

== Awards and honors ==
For his lifetime of work in the animation field, Paliwoda received the Animation Guild's Golden Award in 1985.

== Later life and death ==
Paliwoda, a resident of Manhattan Beach, California, died on June 9, 1999. Ralph Bakshi's short 2015 film Last Days of Coney Island was dedicated to the memory of Paliwoda (and others).

== Filmography ==
=== Film ===
- Snow White and the Seven Dwarfs (1937) (animator – uncredited)
- The Standard Parade (1939) (animator – uncredited)
- Pinocchio (1940) (assistant animator – uncredited)
- Fantasia (1940) (animator – uncredited)
- Bambi (1942) (animator – uncredited)
- Elementary and Pylon Eights (1944) (animator – uncredited)
- The Story of Menstruation (1946) (animator – uncredited)
- Sleeping Beauty (1959) (animator – uncredited)
- Goliath II (1960) (Short) (character animator)
- One Hundred and One Dalmatians (1961) (character animator)
- The Man from Button Willow (1965) (animator)
- The Shooting of Dan McGrew (1965) (animator)
- The Lone Ranger (1966) (animator – 1966)
- Funny Is Funny (1966) (animator)
- Hey, Hey, Hey, It's Fat Albert (TV movie) (1969) (animator/layout artist)
- Shinbone Alley (1970) (animator)
- Aesop's Fables (TV movie) (1971) (supervising animator)
- Journey Back to Oz (1972) (supervising animator)
- Heavy Traffic (1973) (animator – uncredited)
- Treasure Island (1973) (animator)
- Oliver Twist (1974) (animator)
- Coonskin (1974) (sequence animator)
- Metamorphoses (1978) (sequence director)

=== Television ===
- The Magical World of Disney (1956–1957) (animator – 3 episodes)
- The Alvin Show (1962) (animator – 1 episode)
- The Flintstones (1962) (animator – 2 episodes)
- Courageous Cat and Minute Mouse (1961–1962) (21 episodes) (director)
- Sinbad Jr. and His Magic Belt (1965–1966) (3 episodes) (director)
- Archie's Funhouse (1970) (animator)
- Archie's TV Funnies (1971) (supervising animator)
- Fat Albert and the Cosby Kids (1972) (supervising animator)
- Linus the Lionhearted (1964–1965) (animator – 3 episodes)
- Journey to the Center of the Earth (1967) (animator – 17 episodes)
- Aquaman (1967–1969) (animator – 18 episodes)
- Will the Real Jerry Lewis Please Sit Down (1970) (animator – 1 episode)
- Groovie Goolies (1970) (animator – 16 episodes)
- The ABC Saturday Superstar Movie (1972) (supervising animator – 1 episode)
- The Brady Kids (1972–1973) (supervising animator – 22 episodes)
- Emergency +4 (1973) (animator – 11 episodes)
