= Edith Zornow =

American television producer and author

Edith Zornow (March 21, 1919 – November 13, 1991) was an American television producer and author. She won an Emmy in 1964 for The Art of Film, a show hosted by Stanley Kauffmann.

== Career ==
She was a producer at WNDT-TV. In 1970, she joined the Children's Television Workshop. She started work during the first season of Sesame Street where she "helped to define the look of the show, which relies heavily on animation.”

She was the animation producer for Sesame Street and The Electric Company. She was producer for Teeny Little Super Guy.

== Books ==
- With Ruth M Goldstein, The Screen image of youth: movies about children and adolescents (Scarecrow Press, 1980)
- With Ruth M Goldstein, Movies for kids: a guide for parents and teachers on the entertainment film for children (Ungar, 1980)
- With Ruth M Goldstein, Movies for kids: a guide for parents and teachers on the entertainment film for children 9 to 13 (Discus Books, 1973)
