= Mathnet =

- Genre: Children's crime-drama
- Created by: David D. Connell; Jim Thurman
- Developed by: Janette Webb; George E. Swink
- Written by: David D. Connell; Jim Thurman
- Directed by: Charles S. Dubin; James F. Golway; Karl Epstein; Jesus Salvador Treviño; Bill Schreiner
- Starring: Beverly Leech (1987–1990; 19 episodes); Joe Howard (1987–1992; entire series); Toni DiBuono (1991–1992; 11 episodes); James Earl Jones (1987–1988, 1991; 5 episodes); Emilio Del Pozo (1990–1992; 16 episodes); Mary Watson (1987–1990; 13 episodes); Bari K. Willerford (1990–1992; 16 episodes)
- Opening theme: "Danger Ahead"
- Composers: Gerald Fried; John Rodby (conducted and arranged by)
- Country of origin: United States
- No. of seasons: 5
- No. of episodes: 30

Production
- Production locations: Los Angeles (1987–1990); New York City (1990–1992)
- Editor: Ed Brennan
- Camera setup: Film (principal photography); Videotape (post-production); Single-camera setup
- Running time: Varies
- Production companies: Children's Television Workshop; The Webb Organization; Turtleback Productions

Original release
- Network: PBS
- Release: January 26, 1987 – October 23, 1992

Kate Monday (Beverly Leech) and George Frankly (Joe Howard)

Mathnet is a segment on the children's television show Square One Television that follows the adventures of pairs of police mathematicians. It is a pastiche of Dragnet.

== Premise ==
Mathnet is a pastiche of Dragnet, in which the main characters are mathematicians who use their mathematical skills to solve various crimes and mysteries in the city, usually thefts, burglaries, frauds, and kidnappings. Each segment of the series aired on one episode of Square One, a production of the Children's Television Workshop (CTW) aimed at teaching math skills to young viewers. Five segments made up an episode (one for each weekday), with suspense building at the end of each segment. Instead of guns, the detectives carry calculators.

== Characters ==
- George Frankly (Joe Howard) – The partner of Kate Monday (and later Pat Tuesday), George takes his job seriously but is frequently prone to fits of comical mishaps and immature reactions. He appears in all five seasons. He has a wife named Martha whom he often mentions but who is never seen or heard.
- Kate Monday (Beverly Leech) – A pastiche of Jack Webb's Dragnet character Joe Friday, Kate usually remains stoic when on the job and tackles almost every situation with a calm and rational mind. She appears in the first three seasons.
- Pat Tuesday (Toni DiBuono) – George's second partner, appearing in Seasons 4 and 5 to replace Kate. Like Kate, Pat shares the deadpan mannerisms and no-nonsense attitude of Joe Friday.

=== Los Angeles cast ===
- Thad Green (James Earl Jones) – The chief of the Los Angeles Police Department. He briefly appears in Season 4.
- Debbie Williams (Mary Watson) – Technical analyst at the LAPD division where Kate and George work, she is frequently called upon to process data obtained during Mathnet investigations.

=== New York City cast ===
- Joe Greco (Emilio Del Pozo) – Captain of the New York City precinct, he is the man who George, Kate, and later Pat report to when they move to New York City starting in Season 3.
- Benny Pill (Bari K. Willerford) – An undercover NYPD officer, he is Mathnet's semi-regular backup support.

== Guest stars ==
A number of well-known actors and actresses made guest appearances on this show. Among them were:

- Bob Arbogast
- Julie Bennett
- Betty Buckley
- Maddie Corman
- Paul Dooley
- Jonathan Freeman
- Andre Gower
- Tammy Grimes
- Estelle Harris
- Billie Hayes
- John Michael Higgins
- Russell Johnson
- Henry Jones
- James Karen
- Wayne Knight
- Al Lewis
- Geoffrey Lewis
- Kenneth Mars
- Kevin McCarthy
- Eve McVeagh
- Jayne Meadows
- Lara Jill Miller
- Melba Moore
- John Moschitta Jr.
- Ron O'Neal
- Rex Reed
- Jack Riley
- Dick Sargent
- Ronnie Schell
- Madge Sinclair
- Yeardley Smith
- Arnold Stang
- McLean Stevenson
- Guy Stockwell
- Nedra Volz
- Marcia Wallace
- Dick Wilson
- William Windom
- Edward Winter
- "Weird Al" Yankovic

In addition, real-life LAPD officers Sam Salazar and Steve Fellman appeared as themselves; head writers David D. Connell and Jim Thurman also appeared as various characters.

== Math and science ==
Real principles of math and science and mathematical tools used by the detectives to solve crimes include:

- Alphanumerics ("The Case of the Unnatural")
- Fibonacci sequence and modular arithmetic (see also Pisano period) ("The Case of the Willing Parrot")
- Kinematics ("The Problem of the Missing Baseball")
- Chromatic scale ("The Problem of the Passing Parade")
- Displacement of fluids ("The Problem of the Trojan Hamburger")
- Hamiltonian path ("The Case of the Smart Dummy")
- Process of elimination ("The Case of the Great Car Robbery", "The View from the Rear Terrace")
- Number patterns ("The Case of the Missing Air")
- Bar charts and line charts ("The Case of the Purloined Policies", "The Case of the Great Car Robbery")
- Triangulation ("The Case of the Map With a Gap")

== Development and production ==
After a successful first season, production began on six new episodes for the second season. By the time production ended on the third season and its six episodes in 1989, Beverly Leech (Kate Monday) left, and was replaced by a new character named Pat Tuesday, played by Toni DiBuono. Production on the first six episodes with the new character commenced in 1990, and ended in 1991, in time for Square One TV's fourth season. Production on the final season and its five episodes began taping in 1991, and the last episode aired in 1992.

During production, the background music also changed. Originally, it had a synth score. Gradually, as the series progressed, it was replaced with an orchestral score.

The exterior shots of the Los Angeles police station were filmed at the former LAPD Highland Park Police Station, which had closed in 1983. It now houses the Los Angeles Police Museum and is located at 6045 York Boulevard.

The exterior shots of the New York City police station for seasons 3 and 4 were filmed at the Alexander Hamilton U.S. Custom House in Lower Manhattan. It now houses the George Gustav Heye Center of the National Museum of the American Indian and is located at 1 Bowling Green. Exterior shots for the fifth and final season were filmed at the Brooklyn Borough Hall.

== Logo and motto ==
The Mathnet logo and motto

The Los Angeles seal, of which the Mathnet logo is a parody

The Mathnet logo is a pastiche of the Los Angeles city seal. The symbols representing the city were replaced with mathematics iconography. The founding date is the year the pilot episode was filmed.

The Mathnet motto "to cogitate and to solve" is a pastiche of the LAPD motto "to protect and to serve".

At the conclusion of each episode, a title screen displays the Mathnet logo and motto against a blue background. The logo and motto were also featured on the doors of the police cars used in the Los Angeles episodes, mimicking the appearance of actual LAPD police cars.

Despite having their origins in Los Angeles, the show continued to use the logo and motto even after the setting of the show moved to New York City.

== Home media and syndication ==
In 1991, GPN released five episodes from the first two seasons on VHS ("The Problem of the Missing Baseball", "The Trial of George Frankly", "The Problem of the Dirty Money", "The Case of the Missing Air", and "The View from the Rear Terrace").

Around the same time, select PBS stations combined parts of an episode to air in primetime. This was done primarily for seasons 3-5 (New York City era), although at least one omnibus from the Leech era was also broadcast. These versions were re-edited so that they would come in at just under an hour long, featured other segments from Square One TV as "commercials", and newly created end credits, among other differences. Two of the primetime airings were also commercially released as VHS tapes from Republic Pictures in 1994 ("Despair in Monterey Bay" (retitled to "Treasure in Monterey Bay") and "The Case of the Unnatural").

Both Mathnet and Square One went off the air in 1994 (it was rerun until then after the final 1992 season was completed), reappearing from 1999 to 2003 on the cable television network Noggin, a joint venture of Nickelodeon and CTW. However, only 65 episodes were leased by the Noggin network. Mathnet segments also aired on Phred on Your Head Show (one of Noggin's original programs).

== Other media ==
A Mathnet comic briefly appeared in 3-2-1 Contact magazine.

Six Mathnet books, based on episodes of the show, were published:

1. Casebook 1: The Case of the Unnatural (based on Season 4, Episode 1)
2. Casebook 2: Despair in Monterey Bay (based on Season 4, Episode 2)
3. Casebook 3: The Case of the Willing Parrot (based on Season 2, Episode 1)
4. Casebook 4: The Map With a Gap (based on Season 2, Episode 6)
5. Casebook 5: The Case of the Mystery Weekend (based on Season 5, Episode 1)
6. Casebook 6: The Case of the Smart Dummy (based on Season 5, Episode 2)

== Episodes ==
=== Season 1 (1987) ===
All episodes this season were directed by Charles S. Dubin.

No. overall	No. in season	Title	Original release date	Prod. code
1	1	"The Problem of the Missing Monkey"	January 26, 1987 – January 30, 1987	11031–11035
A gorilla named Grunt escapes from the zoo, while a suspect dressed as a gorilla is being used to frame Grunt. With the help of a gorilla handler (Yeardley Smith), the Mathnetters eventually find Grunt (whom they mistakenly believe to be the suspect) climbing the Hollywood Sign. Later they apprehend the suspect at the zoo.
2	2	"The Problem of the Missing Baseball"	February 2, 1987 – February 6, 1987	10540–10760
Pilot episode. (Filmed in 1985.) A very important baseball has to be found at a house, but the house has been stolen by a helicopter. The house is eventually located, and the baseball is found in the fireplace.
3	3	"The Problem of the Passing Parade"	February 9, 1987 – February 13, 1987	11011–11015
A parade was to be featured until the main attraction, Steve Stringbean (a parody of Bruce Springsteen), gets kidnapped. Stringbean tries to communicate the kidnapper's phone number to the Mathnetters in a short piece of music in a proof-of-life message left on an answering machine. He is later found in a musician's house.
4	4	"The Trial of George Frankly"	February 16, 1987 – February 20, 1987	11021–11025
A security video appears to show George robbing a bank. He claims that he was on vacation at that time, and needs proof to back his claims that an imposter stole his identity. During the trial, Kate presents definitive proof a witness was lying, then George exposes the imposter.
5	5	"The Problem of the Dirty Money"	February 23, 1987 – February 27, 1987	11051–11055
Tons of excavated dirt are being stolen from construction sites. As it turns out, a fortune stolen from a "Sphinx" (Brinks) armored truck many years ago was buried in the dirt. The prime suspect has died in jail, but his partner is eventually located.
6	6	"The Mystery of the Maltese Pigeon"	March 2, 1987 – March 6, 1987	14081–14085
In a spoof of The Maltese Falcon, Maureen O'Riley puts a valuable bird sculpture from Malta on display at a museum, but it disappears without a trace. A young Maltese man who belongs to an ancient society helps Mathnet find the truth.
7	7	"The Problem of the Trojan Hamburger"	March 9, 1987 – March 13, 1987	11041–11045
A clown is reported abducted, while a diamond is stolen by a thief who used a secret trick to get in and out. The clown finds his way home. The Mathnetters find that the clown actually staged the kidnapping to steal the diamond.

=== Season 2 (1988) ===
No. overall	No. in season	Title	Directed by	Original release date	Prod. code
8	1	"The Case of the Willing Parrot"	Charles S. Dubin	September 19, 1988 – September 23, 1988	20030–20034
A talking parrot named Little Louie recites the Fibonacci sequence as a clue to the location of a deceased celebrity's inheritance. A thief is also looking for it as well. The parrot goes missing but is found at the suspect's home.
9	2	"The Case of the Great Car Robbery"	James F. Golway	September 26, 1988 – September 30, 1988	20010–20014
20,000 cars have been stolen over a two-month period. Kate and George investigate and meet a teenage girl whose mother's car was also stolen. The cars are eventually found after the Mathnet crew rent a car to use as bait for the car thieves. They lead the Mathnet crew to a chop shop and apprehend the owner as he is crushing the rental car.
10	3	"The Case of the Deceptive Data"	Charles S. Dubin	October 3, 1988 – October 7, 1988	20340–20344
Television show host Mike Pliers asks Kate and George for some help on why his high-rated show got unexpectedly canceled. After visiting viewers who are part of the survey, the ratings devices are discovered to be altered to make it seem as if the show's replacement is being watched.
11	4	"The View from the Rear Terrace"	Charles S. Dubin	October 10, 1988 – October 14, 1988	20320–20324
In this spoof of Rear Window, George investigates seemingly harmless pranks at banks on his own, while Kate is at home with an injury. Kate's neighbor is making bombs, though George doesn't believe her at first.
12	5	"The Case of the Missing Air"	Karl Epstein	October 17, 1988 – October 21, 1988	20020–20024
Kate and George need to figure out the common factors to a chain of robberies, in which the thief was talking like a duck. The thief turns out to be a controversial radio talk show host who robs stores that pulled their ads from his station.
13	6	"The Case of the Map With a Gap"	James F. Golway	October 24, 1988 – October 28, 1988	20000–20004
Kate and George go out to the desert with a young cowboy to find a buried treasure of gold, using the help of angles and mirrors.

=== Season 3 (1990) ===
No. overall	No. in season	Title	Directed by	Original release date	Prod. code
14	1	"The Case of the Ersatz Earthquake"	Jesus Salvador Treviño	January 15, 1990 – January 19, 1990	30001–30005
A self-proclaimed seer appears to have correctly predicted when and where an earthquake in a building would strike, and extorts the city for the time a "Big One" will strike next, but the Mathnetters find out there was a trick to making the ground shake. After this case, the Mathnetters are called to New York City.
15	2	"The Case of the Swami Scam"	Charles S. Dubin	January 22, 1990 – January 26, 1990	30011–30015
Kate and George begin their first assignment in New York City, where retired lawyers are being scammed by a swami who claims to have the right predictions of horse races and lotteries.
16	3	"The Case of the Parking Meter Massacre"	Charles S. Dubin	January 29, 1990 – February 2, 1990	30021–30025
The city's parking meters are being abused and cut off. In a departure for the series, there are two suspects not affiliated with each other. One suspect simply stole the entire meters and the other suspect was looking through quarters, searching for a small valuable object mixed in among them.
17	4	"The Case of the Unkidnapping"	Charles S. Dubin	February 5, 1990 – February 9, 1990	30131–30135
The main star of the broadway musical Anything Went gets kidnapped. But it was revealed that the kidnapping was a hoax to steal money from the show and to frame her co-star, who happens to know Kate when they were in college.
18	5	"The Case of the Strategic Weather Initiative"	Charles S. Dubin	February 12, 1990 – February 16, 1990	30031–30035
A weather plane gets stolen and Kate and George try to find answers to where the plane might have landed. This problem becomes more troubling as the airplane's cooling system requires it to fly before it explodes, putting a limited time on solving the case.
19	6	"The Case of the Masked Avenger"	Charles S. Dubin	February 19, 1990 – February 23, 1990	30081–30085
The Masked Avenger is being used by the mob to make him throw his wrestling match. Guest starring Lara Jill Miller as The Masked Avenger's daughter, Terri.

=== Season 4 (1991) ===
No. overall	No. in season	Title	Directed by	Original release date	Prod. code
20	1	"The Case of the Unnatural"	Jesus Salvador Treviño	September 30, 1991 – October 4, 1991	40121–40125
George's new partner Pat Tuesday is introduced here. In a parody of The Natural, a baseball prospect is kidnapped and replaced by a mechanical imposter. The real player is eventually found and the robot's creator is apprehended.
21	2	"Despair in Monterey Bay"	Jesus Salvador Treviño	October 7, 1991 – October 11, 1991	40101–40105
The Despair Diamond from the "Trojan Hamburger" case is stolen again, this time by a gentleman thief. The Mathnetters return to Los Angeles to solve the case.
22	3	"The Case of the Calpurnian Kugel Caper"	Jesus Salvador Treviño	October 14, 1991 – October 18, 1991	40071–40075
A counterfeiter is ruining the monetary unit of a tiny Monaco-like kingdom ruled by a teenager. The ruler would rather be a game show host than a king, evident by his desires to be one and his obsession with the genre.
23	4	"The Case of the Galling Stones"	Bill Schreiner	October 21, 1991 – October 25, 1991	40111–40115
Pat Tuesday is suspected of stealing an expensive bracelet. But then, she and George find out that there's more to this mystery than a stolen bracelet. Finally they learn that a dictator of a small country framed Pat and stole jewels for an icon.
24	5	"The Case of the Poconos Paradise"	Charles S. Dubin	October 28, 1991 – November 1, 1991	40091–40095
Vacationers to the Poconos and other places are being robbed. A woman who owns a mail company in Bayonne, New Jersey, is the suspect.
25	6	"The Case of the Purloined Policies"	Charles S. Dubin	November 4, 1991 – November 8, 1991	40081–40085
Someone is bankrupting an insurance company with an old-fashioned insurance fraud. A bike gets stolen and a new one has to be made. Finally, the chief manages to find the culprit by identifying his handwriting.

=== Season 5 (1992) ===
No. overall	No. in season	Title	Directed by	Original release date	Prod. code
26	1	"The Case of the Mystery Weekend"	Bill Schreiner	September 21, 1992 – September 25, 1992	50021–50025
Pat and George go to an old house to attend a "Mystery Weekend" game. They soon find out that they've walked right in to a real mystery, as six guests get kidnapped one by one.
27	2	"The Case of the Smart Dummy"	Bill Schreiner	September 28, 1992 – October 2, 1992	50231–50235
A ventriloquist's suitcase containing one of two dummies was switched with another containing $1,000,000.
28	3	"The Case: Off the Record"	Bill Schreiner	October 5, 1992 – October 9, 1992	50011–50015
A record company was producing hit records... ALL BAD! Pat & George go undercover as a music band to find out what's going on.
29	4	"The Case of the Bermuda Triangle"	Jesus Salvador Treviño	October 12, 1992 – October 16, 1992	50251–50255
A young girl with the help of the Mathnetters goes on a treasure hunt to try to clear her old relative's name.
30	5	"The Case of the Piggy Banker"	Bill Schreiner	October 19, 1992 – October 23, 1992	50241–50245
Pat's friend, the daughter of a clown, claims her father is accused of embezzlement at the Bank of Legume and it's up to the Mathnetters to clear his name and find out who really did do it.
