= Crispy Critters =

Breakfast cereal made by Post

Crispy Critters was a breakfast cereal manufactured by Post Cereals starting in 1963. The sweetened cereal, made of oats, consisted of animal-shaped pieces similar to animal crackers. Television commercials featured a cartoon lion, Linus the Lionhearted, voiced by Sheldon Leonard, with the slogan "The one and only cereal that comes in the shape of animals.", sung to the tune of "Trepak" from Tchaikovsky's The Nutcracker ballet. The next year, Linus was spun off into a Saturday-morning cartoon show, which ran for two years on the CBS network, then rerun on the ABC network for three more until 1969. After a decline in popularity, the cereal was discontinued.

Post made an unsuccessful revival attempt of the cereal in 1987. This time, the commercials featured a puppet mascot named "Crispy" with pom-pom antennae, a pom-pom tail and a furry yellow body, resembling a moose. Crispy used an impersonation of Jimmy Durante (provided by Rich Little) including the nonsense phrase "Ah-cha-cha-cha". This puppet interacted with a child actor and was accompanied by smaller puppets that resembled the individual pieces of cereal. Together, these puppets spoke the cereal's tagline: "It's indubitably delicious."

== See also ==
- List of defunct consumer brands
