= Roger Ramjet =

American superhero animated television series (originally aired 1965–69)

- Genre: Comedy; Superhero
- Created by: Fred Crippen
- Written by: Gene Moss; Jim Thurman
- Directed by: Fred Crippen
- Voices of: Gary Owens; Bob Arbogast; Dick Beals; Gene Moss; Jim Thurman; Joan Gerber; Paul Shively; Ken Snyder
- Narrated by: David Ketchum
- Theme music composer: Charles Koren (music); Paul Shively (lyrics)
- Composer: Ivan Ditmars
- Country of origin: United States
- Original language: English
- No. of seasons: 5
- No. of episodes: 156

Production
- Executive producer: Kenneth C. T. Snyder
- Producer: Fred Crippen
- Editor: Dee Futch
- Camera setup: Roger Brown; Jerry Smith; Larry Hogan
- Running time: Around 5 minutes 20 seconds
- Production companies: Pantomime Pictures; Hero Entertainment

Original release
- Network: NBC
- Release: 1965 – 1969

Roger Ramjet is a 1965–1969 American superhero animated television series, starring Roger Ramjet and the American Eagle Squadron. The show was known for its simple animation, frenetic pace, and frequent references to pop culture which appealed to adults as well as children. During its original run, the show aired on NBC.

== Plot ==
Roger Ramjet is a patriotic and highly moral hero who is typically out to save the world with help from his Proton Energy Pills ("PEP"), which give him "the strength of twenty atom bombs for a period of twenty seconds". The world is invariably saved by defeating the various recurring criminals who populate the series.

Ramjet encounters various nemeses during his missions, assigned by General G.I. Brassbottom. Typically, he is caught and must be rescued by his crew of sidekicks, the American Eagles: Yank, Doodle, Dan, and Dee (a play on "Yankee Doodle dandy", which also is the tune of the theme song). His Eagles appear to be children, yet each of them flies his own individual ramjet aircraft expertly (except for Dee), and they are obviously much savvier than their leader.

The various recurring criminals include:

- Pint-sized gangster Noodles Romanoff and his evil organization N.A.S.T.Y. (National Association of Spies, Traitors, and Yahoos). Noodles wears dark glasses, a fedora, and a trench coat. His hands are always jammed into his jacket pockets. Noodles has several lookalike henchmen clad in hats and coats who simultaneously utter incomprehensible phrases of agreement to whatever he says.
- The Solenoid Robots, green, metal gas-mask-faced evildoers from outer space who have a wheel instead of legs and talk in barely understandable electronic voices.
- Red Dog the Pirate, a redheaded squat scourge of the seven seas with an eye patch, peg-leg and a wise-cracking parrot named Carl Bob for a sidekick.
- Jacqueline Hyde (a play on Jekyll and Hyde) is a blond, long-nosed, Zsa Zsa Gabor-accented foreign spy femme fatale who is aided by other spies and gangsters. She tries to get information on plans and documents for her foreign government agency.
- Dr. Frank N. Schwine, a Boris Karloff sound-alike mad scientist who is helped by his purple propeller beanie-wearing assistant Sidney. The two create hulking Frankenstein-style monsters, only to have Roger defeat them and turn them into American football players.
- Count Batguy, a bald Count Orlok-style vampire from Transylvania with a Bela Lugosi accent.
- Dr. What, internationally feared evil genius.
- Sexy senorita Tequila Mockingbird (play on To Kill a Mockingbird) who teams up with her bandito boyfriends the Enchilada Brothers, Beef and Chicken, to stir up revolution in the tiny Latin American country of San Domino.

== Episodes ==
=== Season one (1965) ===
1. "Dr. Ivan Evilkisser"
2. "The Sheik"
3. "Bat Guy"
4. "The Shaft"
5. "Kokomo"
6. "Baseball"
7. "The Cowboy"
8. "Dee Kidnap"
9. "Drafted"
10. "TV Crisis"
11. "Miss America"
12. "The Pirates"
13. "Revolution"
14. "Torture"
15. "The Race"
16. "Jack the Nipper"
17. "Ma Ramjet"
18. "The Cockroaches" – this episode is a parody of the Beatles
19. "Moon"
20. "Hi Noon"
21. "Bank Robbers"
22. "Sun Clouds"
23. "Football"
24. "Bullfighter"
25. "Bathysphere"
26. "Skydiving"
27. "Monkey"
28. "Dr. Frank N. Schwine"
29. "The Martins and the Coys"
30. "Planets"
31. "Orbit"
32. "Tennis"

=== Season two (1966) ===
1. "Werewolf"
2. "Flying Saucers"
3. "Skateboards"
4. "Scotland Yard"
5. "Long Joan Silver"
6. "Moonshot"
7. "Treasure in Sierra's Mattress"
8. "Tarzap"
9. "Comics"
10. "Jet Boots"
11. "Little Roger"
12. "Cycles"
13. "Air Devil"
14. "Spy in the Sky"
15. "Hollywood"
16. "Track Meet"
17. "Surf Nuts"
18. "Dry Dock"
19. "Machines"
20. "Coffee"
21. "Stolen"
22. "Assassins"
23. "Genie"
24. "Airplane"
25. "Woodsman"
26. "K.O. at the Gun Fight Corral"
27. "Mars"
28. "Puck"
29. "Pirate Gold"
30. "Fox"
31. "Super Mother"
32. "Dr. What"

=== Season three (1967) ===
1. "Party"
2. "Large Leslie"
3. "Gamey"
4. "Time Machine"
5. "Horse"
6. "Pool"
7. "Ancestors"
8. "Hoop-dee-Doo"
9. "Big Woof"
10. "Robot Plants"
11. "Robot Plot"
12. "Turkey"
13. "Fishing"
14. "Purloined Pinky"
15. "Snow"
16. "Ripley"
17. "Monster Masquerade"
18. "Lompoc Diamond"
19. "School"
20. "Vaudeville"
21. "Coffee House"
22. "Pirate Games"
23. "Horse Race"
24. "Missing"
25. "Dentist"
26. "Rip Van Ramjet"
27. "Desert Ox"
28. "Ad Game"
29. "Lotsa Pizza"
30. "Land Rush"
31. "Show Business"
32. "The Catnapper"

=== Season four (1968) ===
1. "Opera Phantom"
2. "Pies"
3. "Small World"
4. "Cousin"
5. "Doodle League"
6. "Ark"
7. "Sauce"
8. "Whale"
9. "For the Birds"
10. "Abominable Snowman"
11. "Hero Training"
12. "Lompoc Cannonball"
13. "Safari"
14. "Tiger"
15. "Rodeo"
16. "Dumb Waiter"
17. "Blast Off"
18. "Twas the Night Before"
19. "Portrait of Roger"
20. "Prince and the Doodle"
21. "Water Sucker"
22. "Volcano"
23. "Limberlost"
24. "General Kidnap"
25. "Drought"
26. "How's Your Pass?"
27. "Rabbit Man"
28. "Pill Caper"
29. "Three Faces of Roger"
30. "Private Eye"
31. "Espionage Express"
32. "Winfield of the Infield"

=== Season five (1969) ===
1. "Branch Office"
2. "Wedding Bells"
3. "Bunny"
4. "Hypnochick"
5. "Doctor"
6. "Jolly Rancher"
7. "Little Monster"
8. "Flying Town"
9. "Daring Young Man"
10. "Crown Jewels"
11. "April Fool"
12. "Dry Sea"
13. "Pay Cut"
14. "Killer Doodle"
15. "Polar Bear"
16. "Ruggers"
17. "Nut"
18. "The Law"
19. "Hassenfeffer"
20. "Manhole"
21. "Blockbuster"
22. "Sellout"
23. "Scout Outing"
24. "Love"
25. "Decorator"
26. "Lompoc Lizards"
27. "Blunderosa"
28. "General Doodle"

== Cast and crew ==
- Gary Owens – Roger Ramjet
- David Ketchum – Narrator
- Bob Arbogast – General G. I. Brassbottom, Ma Ramjet, additional voices
- Dick Beals – Yank and Dan of the American Eagles
- Gene Moss – Doodle of the American Eagles, Noodles Romanoff
- Joan Gerber – Dee of the American Eagles, Lotta Love, Jacqueline Hyde
- Paul Shively – Lance Crossfire, Red Dog the Pirate
- Jim Thurman – additional voices
- Ken Snyder – additional voices
- Gene Moss and Jim Thurman were the writers of the series.
- Paul Shively wrote the lyrics for the show's theme song.

== Airdates ==
In the United States, Roger Ramjet first aired on NBC from 1965 to 1969, and later on Cartoon Network from 1996 to 1998. It also aired on KTV from 2017 to 2019.

Roger Ramjet was also broadcast on the BBC and ITV from 1979 to 1994 in the United Kingdom and Europe-wide on Sky Channel from 1985 to 1989 and Bravo from 1992 to 1993. In Australia, the show was aired on the ABC in 1966 in the afternoon and was broadcast until 2003. The series was also screened in several other countries including ZNBC in Zambia, Dubai 33 in the United Arab Emirates, SABC1 in South Africa, KBC in Kenya, and NZBC, South Pacific Television, TV One and TV2 in New Zealand, and on PTV in the Philippines.

Selected "minisodes" of Roger Ramjet are available to stream free on Sony's Crackle.

== Production notes ==
- The creators of the series were from Lompoc, California and worked in many references to the town into the series, including setting several episodes there. Invariably, the name of the town was mispronounced.
- The name "Roger" came about after producer Fred Crippen had an interview with a reporter named Roger Smith. Smith asked Crippen about his new TV show and then joked that the main character should be named Roger.
- The theme song's lyrics are sung to the melody of "Yankee Doodle".
- Many of the production personnel would go on to be involved with Sesame Workshop after Roger Ramjet's run.

== Other credits ==
- Associate Producers: Dick Reed, Paul Shively
- Production Coordinator: Fred Calvert
- Animation: Don Schloat, Alan Zaslove, Bill Hutton, George Nicholas, Fred Crippen
- Background: Jack Heiter
- Layout: Rosemary O'Connor, Sam Weiss, Joe Bruno, Dave Hanan, Bob Kurtz
- Sound Effects: Phil Kaye
- Ink and Paint: Constance Crawley
- Checking: Dottie Mullens
- Sound: TV Recorders, Western Recorders

== DVD release ==
On February 8, 2005, Classic Media (distributed by Sony Wonder) released Roger Ramjet: Hero Of Our Nation (Special Collector's Edition), a three-disc box set containing 119 of the 156 episodes of the series (although the box incorrectly states that 120 episodes are included). Another company, Image Entertainment, previously issued two single-disc DVDs (Roger Ramjet: Hero Of Our Nation and Roger Ramjet: Man Of Adventure), each including 15 cartoons not featured in the three-disc set. This leaves seven cartoons unreleased on DVD (as of November 2007): #36 (Scotland Yard), #125 (Bunny), #128 (Jolly Rancher), #152 (Air Devil), #154 (Dry Dock), #155 (Machines), and #156 (Stolen).

== Soundtrack ==
RCA Victor released a soundtrack album in 1966.
