= Teeny Little Super Guy =

1984 American television film short

- Directed by: Paul Fierlinger
- Written by: Jim Thurman
- Produced by: Edith Zornow
- Starring: Jim Thurman
- Cinematography: Paul Fierlinger; Dave Connell
- Edited by: Patrick McMahon
- Music by: Larry Gold
- Distributed by: Children's Television Workshop
- Release date: February 17, 1984
- Running time: 3 minutes
- Country: United States
- Language: English

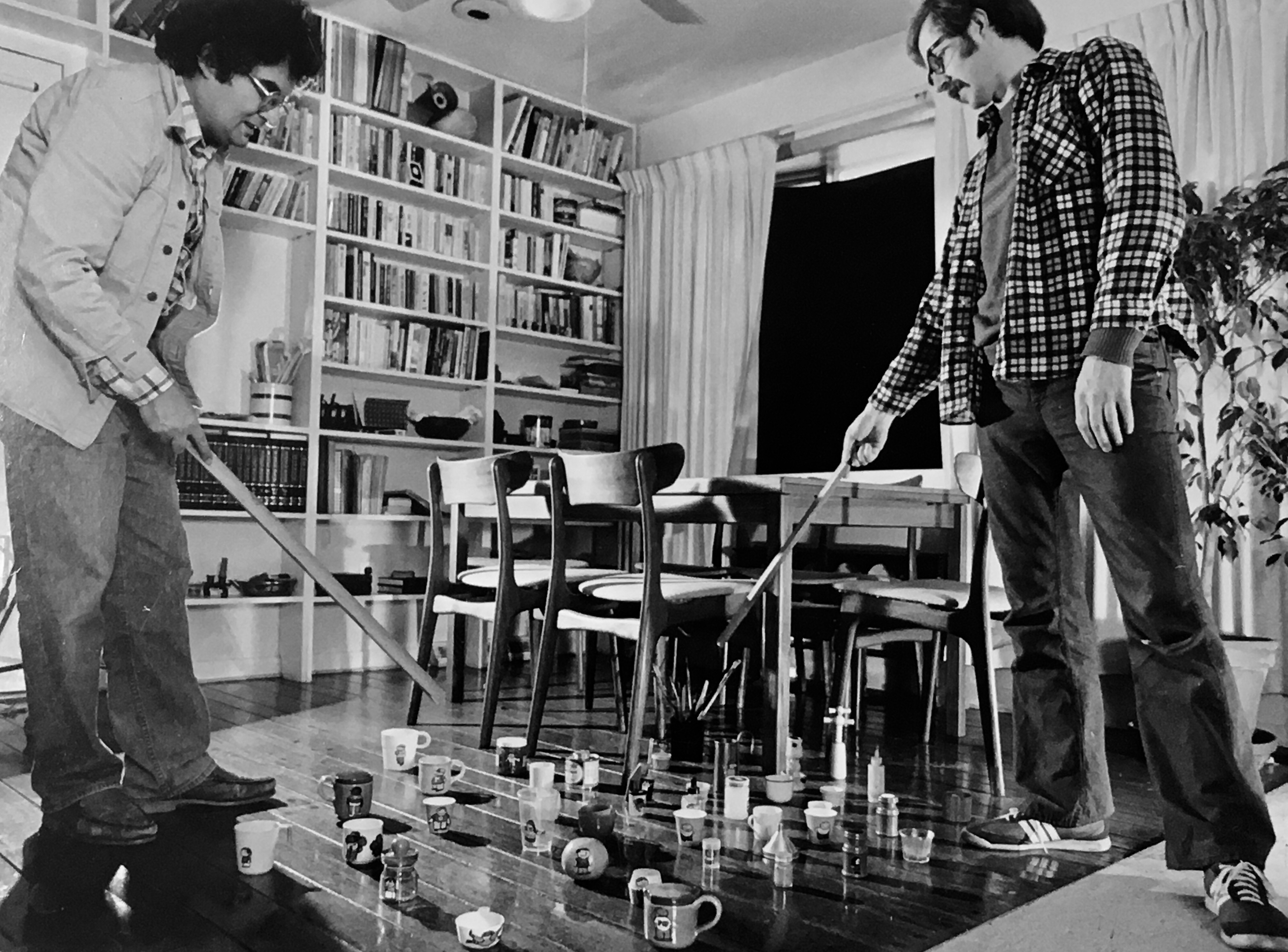
Paul Fierlinger and Tom Sloan animating cups for the SCHOOL episode. 1982

Teeny Little Super Guy was an animated short featured on PBS's Sesame Street. The shorts featured a small animated man, the Teeny Little Super Guy, who resides in a live-action, regular-sized kitchen. He is a small, bald man who wears a yellow hat, a yellow long-sleeved shirt, red pants and black shoes. He also lives attached to a clear plastic cup. Robert W. Morrow described the shorts as including "parables of childhood conflict and striving."

== Background ==
Teeny Little Super Guy (TLSG) was created by animator Paul Fierlinger as a series of 13 installments for PBS's Sesame Street in 1982. The first Teeny Little Super Guy cartoon took two months to create. The series of segments were frequently shown on Sesame Street for several years. However, in the late 1990s the segments were shown sporadically (eventually not appearing on the show at all from 1997 to 2000). The segments reappeared briefly on Sesame Street in 2001 and a short clip (a part of the theme song only) was shown on Sesame Street's 35th anniversary special, The Street We Live On (2004). The shorts have not appeared on Sesame Street since 2002.

== Production ==
The production for Teeny Little Super Guy started in May 1982 with Paul Fierlinger, Larry Gold, Jim Thurman, Tom Sloan, Stuart Horn, Ondre Oceanas, and Edith Zornow. In August 1982, the production for the shorts developed more seriously into filming the first two shorts. On February 17, 1984, the first short premiered on Sesame Street. Composer Larry Gold wrote the theme song, with lyrics by Stuart Horn. Actor and longtime Sesame Street writer Jim Thurman performed all character voices. The production started filming in Philadelphia, Pennsylvania at Paul Fierlinger's house in the Philadelphia suburbs. It ran periodically on Sesame Street from 1984 until 2001.

As of 2009, one of the Teeny Little Super Guy cups, along with a picture of Fierlinger rotating the cups, was inside the public display case at the Brooklyn Public Library along with the other Sesame Street contributors. The display also includes another picture of the character with a yellow balloon. The plaque at the library mentions that "Teeny Little Super Guy," an instant hit two seasons later in 1984, was shot by stop-motion filmmaker Fierlinger using common household objects. Most of the animation was done by Tom Sloan along with Ondre Ocenas and Helena Fierlinger. In Episode 4196 of Sesame Street, Luis was inspecting Leela's troubled washing machine. He managed to extract seven items, including the famous Teeny Little Super Guy.

The filming was done primarily in Fierlinger's house and his studio next door. It was filmed using a 16mm Bolex with an electric motor drive giving a shutter speed of about 1/6 of a second. This allowed for higher f-stops and therefore having the 3D objects to be in better focus. Some of the scenes used early video assist to see how the scene looked on a TV monitor.

== Segments ==
Airdate	Theme	Episode	Description
February 17, 1984	Social Skills	Baseball	Teeny Little Super Guy notices that his friend Alice wants to join a baseball game. He encourages her to go over there and ask them whether she can play.
March 22, 1984	Health & Safety	The Red Hat	R.W. Shipshape gets a "really good hat" for his birthday, and it blows into the street. R.W. remembers not to cross the street without an adult; Teeny Little Superguy helps him across.
November 19, 1984	Social Skills	School	Teeny Little Super Guy reminisces to his friend Eugene, who starts kindergarten tomorrow, about his own first day at school.
November 20, 1984	Sharing	Swing of Cooperation	Two boys are fighting over a swing. Teeny Little Super Guy shows them how to share.
November 26, 1984	Health & Safety	Danger	Teeny Little Super Guy talks about the time he learned the importance of safety.
November 27, 1984	Practice	Practice Riding Eggbeaters	Teeny Little Super Guy finds his friend Janey giving up on learning how to ride an eggbeater (as one would ride a bicycle) because she keeps falling off. Teeny Little Super Guy tells her that it takes practice to be good at something and gives her a set of training beaters to help keep her balance.
December 17, 1984	Pets	Pet Spoon	R.W. learns how to care for a pet.
March 12, 1985	Health & Safety	Sleep	Teeny Little Super Guy shows his friend Harry the importance of sleep. *Note: This episode is shown either with or without the closing theme sequence.
1987	N/A	Cereal	An ID for Nickelodeon. Teeny Little Super Guy dances around a cereal box with a Nickelodeon stripe, before pouring the cereal into the bowl. The cereal box turns into the Nickelodeon logo and the bowl melts.

== Cast ==
=== Voices ===
- Jim Thurman performed all voices for the short

=== Music ===
- Theme and all incidental music - Larry Gold
- Theme vocals - Essra Mohawk
- The voice of the Teeny Little Super Guy - Jim Thurman
- Lyrics - Stuart Horn
