= Paul Fierlinger =

Czech director and artist (1936–2025)

- Born: Pavel Fierlinger; March 15, 1936; Ashiya, Hyōgo, Japan
- Died: April 4, 2025 (aged 89); Penn Wynne, Pennsylvania, U.S.
- Citizenship: Czechoslovakia; United States
- Occupation: Animator

Paul Fierlinger (born Pavel Fierlinger; March 15, 1936 – April 4, 2025) was a Czech-American creator of animated films and shorts, especially animated documentaries. He was also a part-time lecturer at University of Pennsylvania School of Design.

== Early life ==
Paul Fierlinger was born on March 15, 1936, in Ashiya, Japan. His father, Jan Fierlinger, was a Czechoslovak diplomat, and his uncle Zdeněk Fierlinger was a prominent figure in the Czechoslovak communist regime from 1948 until 1968. He spent the World War II years in the United States. He studied at a boarding school in Poděbrady, where his schoolmates included Miloš Forman, Ivan Passer, and Václav Havel. There, at age 12 Fierlinger created his first animated film by shooting drawings from his flipbook with a 16 mm Bolex camera. His experiences of youth and the difficulties of adapting to life in the United States and then returning to Czechoslovakia are documented in his biopic animated film Drawn from Memory.

== European career ==
In 1955, he graduated from the School of Applied Arts in Bechyně. After two years of military service, he freelanced in Prague as a book illustrator and gag cartoonist for cultural periodicals under the pen name Fala. Fierlinger established himself in 1958 as Czechoslovakia's first independent producer of animated films, providing 16 mm films from his home studio in Prague for Czechoslovak Television and the 16 mm division of Kratký Film. Fierlinger was one of the first animators in all of the communist countries across the Eastern Bloc to get away with privately producing animated films, which he sold to many state-run film and television studios across Czechoslovakia. Thus, he created approximately 200 films, ranging from 10-second station breaks to 10-minute theatrical releases and TV children’s shorts.

In 1967, Fierlinger moved from communist Czechoslovakia to the Netherlands for freedom, where he pitched for a number of station breaks for Dutch television in Hilversum. He then went to Paris, France to work for a short stint as a spot animator for Radio Television France and ended up in Munich, West Germany for half a year, having been offered the job of key animator on a feature film at Linda Films, The Conference of the Animals. In West Germany, before his departure to the United States, he married Helena Straková, a Czechoslovak compatriot and photographer.

== AR&T ==
In the United States Fierlinger formed AR&T Associates Inc., his own animation house, in 1971. It produced animated segments for ABC's Harry Reasoner specials and PBS' Sesame Street, including the popular Teeny Little Super Guy series; a network ID for TVPaint; Nickelodeon; and more. Since 1971, AR&T produced over 700 films, of which several hundred were television commercials. Many of these films received considerable recognition, including a nomination for the Academy Award for Best Animated Short Film for It's So Nice to Have a Wolf Around the House. His other awards include some from the Ottawa International Animation Festival for And Then I'll Stop, a 1989 film on drug and alcohol abuse. At that time, Paul and Helena divorced.

== 1990s and beyond ==
Fierlinger became a steady provider of many TV commercials and sales films for US Healthcare (now Aetna), winning a variety of international awards. At this time he met and married Sandra Schuette, a fine-arts painter and printmaker at the Museum of Fine Arts School in Boston and the Pennsylvania Academy of the Fine Arts. Together they developed a small series of interstitials for Nickelodeon called Amby & Dexter: The Way of Silent; a Sesame Street series called Alice Kadeezenberry; and a twenty-minute film of children’s songs for the Children's Book of the Month Club called Playtime.

During this time, Fierlinger received a commission from PBS' American Playhouse to create a one-hour-long autobiography, called Drawn from Memory.

In 1997, Fierlinger received a PEW Fellowship in the Arts award for the body of his work.

In the late 1990s, ITVS, an agency of the Corporation for Public Broadcasting, commissioned Fierlinger to create a half-hour PBS special called Still Life with Animated Dogs. This film, about dogs and other things of a divine nature, premiered on PBS on March 29, 2001 and later aired on Independent Lens. The film went on to win First Prize at the 2002 International Festival of Animation in Zagreb and the Peabody Award in April 2001.

At the end of 1999, production on Still Life had to be interrupted for several months so that the Fierlingers could develop and begin the production of an animation series for Oxygen Network, Drawn from Life: two-minute films that feature the voices and simple stories of real-life women. That series won the Grand Prix of 2000 at the Ottawa International Animation Festival in Ottawa, Ontario, Canada.

The Fierlingers' own production of My Dog Tulip, based on the book of the same title by British author J. R. Ackerley, featured the voice talents of Christopher Plummer, Lynn Redgrave, and Isabella Rossellini.

Paul and Sandra Fierlinger lived Penn Wynne, Pennsylvania, where they maintained a home studio. Paul Fierlinger died at home in Penn Wynne on April 4, 2025, at the age of 89.

== Selected filmography ==
- Rainbowland (1978)
- It's So Nice to Have a Wolf Around the House (1979)
- And Then I’ll Stop (1989)
- Drawn from Memory (1995)
- Still Life with Animated Dogs (2000)
- My Dog Tulip (2009)
- Me... Jane (2014, animator, director and painter)
- Slocum at Sea with Himself (2015)
