= Fred Crippen =

American animator (1928–2018)

Fred Crippen (January 8, 1928 – March 22, 2018) was an American animator, director and producer known for his work in early television animation. He began his career in New York in the early 1950s before joining United Productions of America (UPA), where he directed numerous segments for The Boing Boing Show (1956) and became associated with a highly stripped-down visual style. Around 1959 he co‑founded the studio Pantomime Pictures, which he led for more than five decades and where he produced a wide range of commercial and entertainment projects for television and film. He was the creator of 1960s animated series Roger Ramjet (1965)
