= Bob Arbogast =

American actor (1927–2009)

- Born: April 1, 1927; Bellingham, Washington, U.S.
- Died: March 21, 2009 (aged 81); Fresno, California, U.S.

Robert "Bob" Arbogast (April 1, 1927 – March 21, 2009) was an American radio broadcaster, voice actor, and television host.

== Early life and education ==
Bob was born in Bellingham, Washington, the only child of Lewis, a champion tennis player, stockbroker, World War One veteran under an assumed name, and World War Two Coast Guard volunteer and Christine Arbogast, a champion tennis player. Bob attended John Marshall High School in Los Angeles where he was on the league-champion tennis team and was graduated in 1944. Upon graduation, he enlisted in the navy. His unit was awarded the Presidential Unit Citation and Bronze Star for bravery for a multi-ship raid into Tokyo Bay. He was demoted from Signalman 3rd class to Seaman 1st class when his commanding officer told him to hop to it and Bob proceeded to jump up and down on the deck of the USS Brush. At the train station in Atwater Village (Glendale), upon his return from the South Pacific theater, he saw the coffins of many of his classmates from Marshall High who had died, and did not live to see a world without war. When the war ended, he attended Los Angeles City College and then the University of Arizona on the GI bill. A radio program director from WHB in Kansas City heard Arbogast's nighttime show on the university's radio station and hired him immediately.

== Career ==
Arbogast and Pete Robinson paired at AM radio station KOPO in January 1950, but the station cancelled them after one show, when a possible advertiser complained about a skit. They switched to KCNA, where they performed until May. After almost signing with the Mutual Broadcasting System, they signed with WHB in Kansas City, in September 1950, for The Arbogast Show. Bob went to Chicago's WMAQ where he worked with Robinson from 1951 to 1953 (using as a theme song a charming version of Sicilian Tarantella played on an ocarina) before moving to Los Angeles for a time, then returning to Illinois where he worked at WEAW in Evanston, Illinois. Then he went to New York where he wrote for two shows, one featuring Tom Poston and another Peter Marshall. Then he worked at San Francisco's KSFO and KFRC. He later worked at many stations in Los Angeles including KMPC from 1962 to 1967, KLAC in 1967, KFI in 1968, and KGBS in 1969.

At KMPC, he wrote for Dick Whittinghill and Gary Owens, and he wrote with and was the partner of Jack Margolis at KLAC and KGBS. Their radio talk show at KLAC had the highest rating of any radio program in LA history up until that time (and perhaps still), with a 14.5 percent share of the audience. Due to a concentrated letter-writing campaign, they were fired for their objection to the Vietnam war and their pro-choice stance. They may have been among the last fired due to the McCarthy dealings of the 1950s. The pair also hosted a TV show on KTTV for a while.

Arbogast created the Question Man in Kansas City in 1951 and used it on the Poston Show in NY. It was later a feature on The Steve Allen Show, to the surprise of Bob and Steve - as Allen acknowledged in his book, The Question Man. The concept lived on in Johnny Carson's Carnac the Magnificent and Jeopardy!.

In 1958, Arbogast teamed with Stanley Ralph Ross to write and perform the hit 45 rpm single "Chaos, Parts 1 and 2," which when it came out (on Liberty Records #55197), sold 10,000 copies in three days, and then was banned from radio play on the fourth day - when stations realized that it satirized "Top 40" radio. Dr. Demento has kept "Chaos" alive. In addition, they co-wrote the album of parody songs titled My Son, the Copycat (a take on Allan Sherman's albums) and the book Speak When You Hear the Beep.

Arbogast had numerous screen credits for cartoons and commercials and had appeared on television shows and in movies. He did frequent uncredited voiceovers for Sesame Street segments. He was the voice for the original "What would you do for a Klondike Bar?" advertising campaign and of the animated Granny Goose for the Granny Goose potato chip campaign (What is Granny's secret? I won't say...") Among hundreds, Arbogast is perhaps most famous for his voicings of General G.I. Brassbottom, Noodles Romanoff, and Ma Ramjet in the Roger Ramjet cartoon, Jack Wheeler in the Hot Wheels cartoon, and Snogs on the Hanna-Barbera animated series Monchhichis. He also voiced several characters in the Hanna-Barbera series The Jetsons. Not to be forgotten were Arbo's stylings of Barry Bear and Drummy Drummer, popular seventies pull-string toys - "I'm Barry Bear, like to meet my paw?" "I'm Drummy Drummer. I went to school at the school of hard knocks." - and his renditions of hamburgers in early McDonald's commercials. While in elementary school at Franklin Avenue in Los Angeles, his son John was scolded when asked by his teacher, Mrs. Horowitz, what his father does for a living. John replied, "he is a bear." Refusing to recant, a meeting with the teacher, principal, and Bob resulted in free hot dogs on "Hot Dog Wednesday" for John for a year. John also has many voices still running on Sesame Street. In 1966 he appeared in the campy horror film "Batwoman".

One of his most popular bits was his portrayal of little old lady Emily Norton for KMPC, including on the program Emily Norton's Juke Box.

Among his many TV and radio commercial partners were Pat Harrington, Harry Morgan, Doris Roberts, Joan Gerber, Edie McClurg, Bob Elliott, Albert Brooks, Shelley Berman, Tim Conway, Lorenzo Music, Gene Moss and Casey Kasem. He was friends with Bob Einstein.

Arbogast won an Emmy as a writer for Stars of Jazz in 1958 and a Clio in the '70's, for the Highland Appliance Co. of Detroit. He wrote for Sesame Street, Jay Ward live action special The Nut House!! (1963), and The Pat Paulsen Show. He also has the dubious distinction of writing for the shortest-lived television show ever, Turn-On, which was canceled after one night because it satirized, among others, the Pope. He co-starred (had two lines and 6 minutes on camera) with Timothy Hutton and Sean Penn in the motion picture The Falcon and the Snowman and he drove the bus in Linda Lovelace for President.

Arbogast was a jazz aficionado, Chicago Cubs and UCLA Bruins fan, and animal lover. He and his wife, Jan, lived in Mariposa, California, tending to their garden, caring for their pets, and the pleasures of the internet, satellite radio and television. With his previous wife, Joanna, he raised a daughter and three sons. His oldest son Peter is the radio voice of USC Trojan football. His middle son John is a USC honors grad, a decorated Coast Guard officer, retired Los Angeles city park ranger, history teacher, city champion pole vault coach and assistant track and field coach at John Marshall High School. His youngest son Jerry is a UCLA graduate and a retired physical education teacher and tennis coach in the Los Angeles Unified School District. His daughter Paula retired in June 2006 from her position as a teachers' union representative. With his first wife, Tobi, he had a son, Robert Jr. (Ted), an accomplished musical director and band leader, and the technology coordinator for Terlingua High School in Texas. Bob is also survived by six grandchildren and six great-grandchildren. Arbogast died March 21, 2009 at the age of 81 at the Saint Agnes Medical Center in Fresno.
