= Fine Arts Films =

Animation Studio

Fine Arts Films was a production studio based in Northern England and Hollywood. It was founded in 1955 by the animator John David Wilson as a means to preserve the notion of animation as an art form. It shut down in 1996.

== History ==
The company's first production was Tara, the Stonecutter, which won high praise and many awards including the New York Golden Eagle, the London Film Festival Award and the Edinburgh Film Festival Award. The next production was the groundbreaking animated music special Petroushka (based on Stravinsky's ballet) for NBC's Sol Hurok Music Hour. It was noted for being one of the first animated shows on television and for being what could be called the first music video. Stravinsky himself conducted the Los Angeles Philharmonic.

Fine Arts Films sought to raise the bar on children's entertainment by creating educational and illuminating shorts, many of which were shown in schools during class. These shorts were also broadcast as part of NBC's show Exploring and won the Peabody Award. Wilson additionally has seven Golden Eagle Awards for this work.

Wilson was given the chance by Australian television to set up shop in Melbourne. He later returned to the United States to work on his only feature film, Shinbone Alley, based on the hit Broadway musical of the 1950s. Shinbone incorporated the talents of some of the original cast, including Eddie Bracken as Archie the Cockroach, Carol Channing as Mehitabel, and John Carradine as Tyrone T. Tattersol.

One of the studio's more notable achievements was for the 1960 Seattle World's Fair. The film, Journey to the Stars, used cutting-edge technology and was seen by over seven million people. It was the first 70mm Fulldome presentation, a precursor to IMAX.

Other noteworthy credits include opening titles and many music videos for The Sonny and Cher Show, the animated opening sequence for Grease, an animated trailer for Billy Wilder's Irma La Douce and the ABC-TV half-hour animated special, Stanley, the Ugly Duckling. He directed The Seventh Brother for Family Films, Fox Network-TV's Peter Pan and the Pirates, Fraggle Rock, Muppet Babies, Jem and The Specialists for MTV. In 1971 Fine Arts produced an animated video for the song "One Tin Soldier" by Coven which was the theme for the movie Billy Jack and aired on the Sonny & Cher Show and becoming a chart hit twice in 1971 and 1973. The video also aired occasionally as part of local TV Saturday Morning cartoon packages in Canada into the 1980s.

=== Film highlights ===
- Tara, the Stonecutter (1955) (New York Golden Eagle, London Film Festival Award, Edinburgh Film Festival Award)
- Journey to the Stars (film) (1960) (shown at the 1962 Seattle World's Fair)
- Shinbone Alley (film) (1970) (Golden Phoenix)
- Grease (film) (1978)

=== Television highlights ===
- Petrushka (segment on Sol Hurok Music Hour) (1956)
- Exploring (1964-1966)
- The Sonny and Cher Show (TV series) (1970–73)
- The Carol Burnett Show (TV series) (1972–76)
- COS w/Bill Cosby (TV series) (1974)
- Stanley, the Ugly Duckling (TV show) (1982)
- The Specialists (TV show) (1992)

=== Home video and commercial video release ===
Video Gems, a home video company, released at least two anthologies of short-form animation films by John Wilson, John Wilson's Animation Wonderland and John Wilson's Mini Musicals (also known as The Fantastic All-Electric Music Movie).

- Animation Wonderland was released on VHS in the early 1980s. It includes over 15 animation shorts by Wilson that were produced for NBC TV in the US. The video is over 100 minutes in length. The animation works, based on famous children stories and folklore, included were Casey at the Bat, Gulliver's Travels, The Salty Sea, The Early Birds, The Tinder Box and Voyage to the Moon.
- John Wilson's Mini Musicals or The Fantastic All-Electric Music Movie included 16 short-form animation music videos that were originally produced for The Sonny and Cher Show and broadcast on CBS TV from the early-to-mid-1970s. Some of the music videos were animated to the popular songs of the day. many featuring renditions by Sonny Bono and Cher. Included on this video release are two music videos for the Joni Mitchell songs "Big Yellow Taxi" and "Both Sides Now". Another short form animated music video Sonny and Cher performing "Bad, Bad Leroy Brown" and "Higher Ground". All 16 animated music videos were produced and created by Wilson's Fine Arts Films.
