= Reuben H. Fleet =

American aviation pioneer

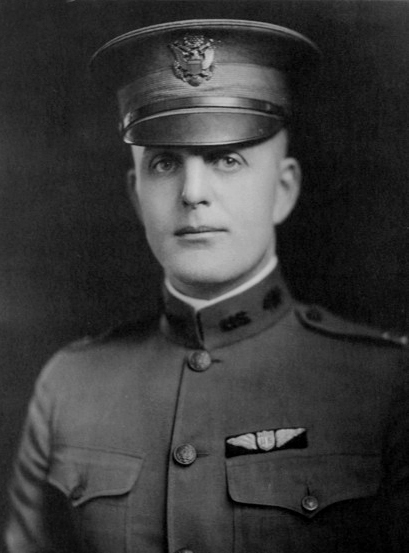
- Born: Reuben Hollis Fleet; March 6, 1887; Montesano, Washington, US
- Died: October 29, 1975 (aged 88); San Diego, California, US
- Resting place: Fort Rosecrans National Cemetery, Point Loma, San Diego
- Education: Culver Military Academy

Reuben Hollis Fleet (March 6, 1887 – October 29, 1975) was an American aviation pioneer, industrialist and army officer. Fleet founded and led several corporations, including Consolidated Aircraft.

== Birth and early career ==
Fleet was born on March 6, 1887, to Lillian Waite and David Fleet in Montesano, Washington. The Fleets were a prosperous family; David Fleet was city engineer and county auditor for Montesano, and owned large tracts of land in the Washington Territory. He also served as the city clerk. Reuben grew up in Grays Harbor, Washington. The Panic of 1893 wiped out the land holdings of the Fleets and the family lived in much diminished conditions from the time Reuben was six until he was thirteen.

At 15, Fleet attended Culver Military Academy where his uncle, Alexander Fleet, was superintendent. He spent his fourth and final year at the academy as the editor-in-chief of the cadet newspaper, the C.M.A. Vedette. Culver provided the equivalent of an associate degree, and after his graduation Fleet intended to continue his education at Stanford University.

Deciding against going to Stanford immediately, in 1907 Fleet returned home, where he took the state teachers examination and began teaching all grades from first through eighth. After a number of months, Fleet set himself up as a realtor and resigned from teaching. It was also during this time that Fleet joined the Washington National Guard, as captain.

In 1908, with a loan from Montesano State Bank for $1500, Fleet began investing in local real estate, which would eventually culminate in Fleet owning large tracts of timberland which he would subdivide and parcel out, often for railroad right-of-way or logging, for substantial profit.

In March 1911, Fleet, a captain of a National Guard company, was ordered with his men to quell a civil disturbance organized by the Industrial Workers of the World, a militant labor organization. Later, from April through May Fleet and three other officers were assigned to San Diego, California, to keep track of the agitators who had moved south from Washington and Oregon, heading to Mexico. So impressed was Fleet with San Diego and its climate that he told himself that he would arrange to have his business in San Diego if he could. The promise was kept 24 years later when he relocated the Consolidated plant to San Diego from Buffalo, New York.

== Army career ==
Anticipating the entry of the United States into World War I Fleet closed his office in March 1917 and reported to the training facility of the Aviation Section of the Signal Corps, United States Army, in San Diego. Commissioned in the Army as a major, Fleet graduated Junior Military Aviator No. 74. He was then assigned as acting commanding officer of the 18th Aero Squadron, Training.

During the war in Europe Fleet was the executive officer for Flying Training, Signal Corps Aviation Section, stationed in Washington, D.C., with temporary duty in England. His commanding officer was Colonel 'Hap' Arnold.

In May 1918 Fleet was tasked with setting up the first scheduled U. S. Air Mail between New York and Washington, D.C., the Aerial Mail Service being jointly operated by the Department of War and U.S. Post Office Department. Fleet was appointed Officer-in-Charge of the Aerial Mail Service in addition to his duties as executive officer for Flying Training. Fleet successfully petitioned President Wilson personally to suspend the expansion of the air mail service to Boston until better equipment and facilities were created.

Fleet was in charge of the airmail service in 1918 when the famous 24-cent Inverted Jenny postage stamp was printed in error. It became one of the rarest collector stamps of United States postage. In 2013 the United States Postal Service commemorated this issue by printing 2,182,000 Souvenir sheets. Each had six of the stamps (repriced at $2) surrounded by period images. Dressed as a World War I-era aviator, Fleet appears in the lower left quadrant of the sheet.

Fleet's next assignment was as the Army Air Service's chief aviation contracting officer, part of the Engineering Division, based at McCook Field. There he played key roles in the development of the turbocharger for aero applications and the testing of a number of other aviation innovations, including the Loening PW-2A, the first American pursuit monoplane, and the de Bothezat helicopter. Fleet performed some of the flight testing himself.

Fleet was awarded the Distinguished Service Medal for his service at McCook Field. With post-war budgets slashed and commissioned officers being reduced one rank Fleet felt he'd gone as far as he could in military aviation. On 30 November 1922, Thanksgiving Day, Fleet, his superior officer and the chief of the Power Plant Section announced to the press that they were resigning.

== Consolidated years ==
Upon resigning his commission Fleet accepted a position with Gallaudet Aircraft Company. Fleet arranged the merger between Gallaudet Aircraft Company and Dayton-Wright Company to create his own company, Consolidated Aircraft Company, in 1923. He hired Isaac Machlin Laddon, who had been in charge of design of heavy aircraft at McCook Field. One of his first goals was to secure the contract to design a twin-engine night bomber for the Army. Teaming with Sikorsky, they failed to win the competition with their S-37 design. Consolidated then went on to a long line of successful designs and lucrative contracts for seaplanes for the Navy. Starting with their XPY-1 of 1928, the company's string of successes culminated in one of the most numerous and successful seaplanes, the Consolidated PBY Catalina.

Exploiting Fleet's experience in Army flight training, Consolidated produced a popular military training aircraft, the PT-11 (Consolidated Model 21) primary/advanced trainer. Leading Consolidated, Fleet founded or acquired a number of subsidiaries, including Fleet Aircraft to market civilian designs, Tonawanda Products Corporation to supply components, and Hall-Aluminum Aircraft Corporation. Among the companies acquired by Fleet during time was the Thomas-Morse Aircraft which was failing yet had outstanding contracts to deliver. Fleet selected San Diego, California, to relocate Consolidated from Buffalo, New York, where winter weather restricted seaplane operations. The move occurred in 1935.

In November, 1941 Fleet elected to sell a majority of his shares in Consolidated to Vultee Aircraft. The resulting company, Consolidated Vultee Aircraft Corporation, became known as Convair. He continued on in the role of adviser and consultant for five more years. He also became a private consultant for Franklin D. Roosevelt.

Consolidated went on to become a key supplier of heavy bombers with the widely produced B-24 Liberator playing a key role in the Allied strategic bombing campaigns, and the Convair B-36—the world's largest piston-engined bomber—filling a crucial gap in the Cold War years until jet-powered bombers became widely available.

In August 1946, Fleet and his sister, Lillian, bought a parcel of land in Montesano and donated it to the city for use as a park named in honor of their parents. The city subsequently renamed Second Street to Fleet Street in their honor.

== Retirement and philanthropy ==
Leaving Consolidated, Fleet divided his time between his landmark home in Point Loma, California, the "Spanish Castle", and his residence in Palm Springs, California. During this time Fleet served on the California State Highway Commission. He was also active in the Institute of the Aeronautical Sciences (IAS), the professional society for aeronautical engineers and researchers in related fields. IAS was founded in 1932 and was the predecessor of today's AIAA.

In 1961 Fleet founded the San Diego Aerospace Museum to commemorate President Kennedy's commitment to land a man on the moon within this decade.

In 1965 Fleet was invested in the International Aerospace Hall of Fame, and his portrait now hangs along with the other inductees' in the Hall of Fame's gallery within the San Diego Air and Space Museum. In 1967, Fleet's son, Sandy, founded the Fotomat Corporation.

In the early 1970s, Fleet largely funded construction of The Bishop Center for Performing Arts at Grays Harbor College in Aberdeen, Washington, in honor of E. K. "Ned" and Lillian Fleet Bishop. Lillian was Fleet's sister, and "Ned" Bishop, a logging tycoon in western Washington state, was an early investor in Consolidated Aircraft. The Bishops left their fortune to a foundation that funds operation of the Bishop Center.

The Reuben H. Fleet Space Theatre, now the Fleet Science Center, was established in San Diego in 1973 after an initial gift by his son Preston Fleet and the rest of the Fleet family. It was the first science museum to combine interactive science exhibits with a planetarium and very large screen theater based on the IMAX film format, setting the pattern that most major science museums have since adopted.

In 1975, Reuben was inducted into the National Aviation Hall of Fame in Dayton, Ohio.

== Personal life ==
Fleet married Elizabeth Girton on April 29, 1908, and they settled in Montesano, Washington. They had two children, Phyllis Fleet and David Girton Fleet; David later became an executive with Consolidated and a real estate developer, creator of the upscale Fleetridge neighborhood in San Diego. Fleet and Elizabeth were divorced in 1920. In 1931 he married Dorothy Mitchell, and they had three children, Preston "Sandy" Fleet, Dorothy Fleet, and Nancy Fleet. Preston Fleet went on to found the Fotomat Corporation. Fleet and Dorothy were divorced in 1944. He married Eva May VanDenburgh in 1947.

Fleet died in San Diego on October 29, 1975, at age 88 from injuries related to a fall. He was buried at Fort Rosecrans National Cemetery, Point Loma, San Diego, California.
