= Archy and Mehitabel =

Fictional characters created by Don Marquis

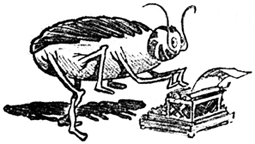
The first illustration of Archy. Seen in an advertisement in the New-York Tribune on September 11, 1922, introducing the new column.

Archy and Mehitabel (styled as archy and mehitabel) are fictional characters created in 1916 by Don Marquis, a columnist for The Evening Sun newspaper in New York City. Archy, a cockroach, and Mehitabel, an alley cat, appeared in hundreds of humorous verses and short stories in Marquis's daily column, "The Sun Dial". Their exploits were first collected in the 1927 book archy and mehitabel, which remains in print today, and in two later volumes, archys life of mehitabel (1933) and archy does his part (1935). Many editions are recognized by their distinctive illustrations by George Herriman, the creator of Krazy Kat.

== History ==
Marquis introduced Archy into his daily newspaper column at New York's Evening Sun. Archy—whose name was always written in lower case in the book titles, but was upper case when Marquis would write about him in narrative form—was a cockroach who had been a free verse poet in a previous life, and took to writing stories and poems on an old typewriter at the newspaper office when everyone in the building had left. Archy would climb up onto the typewriter and jump on one key at a time, laboriously typing out stories of the daily challenges and travails of a cockroach. Archy's best friend was Mehitabel, an alley cat, who thought of herself as a reincarnated Cleopatra and one of "King Tut-ankh-amen's favorite queens." The two of them shared a series of day-to-day adventures that made satiric commentary on daily life in the city during the 1910s and 1920s.

Due to his small size, Archy was unable to operate the shift key on the typewriter and thus wrote his stories entirely in lowercase, with no punctuation. When Marquis wrote in his own persona, though, he always used correct capitalization and punctuation. As E. B. White wrote in his introduction to The Lives and Times of Archy and Mehitabel, it would be incorrect to conclude that, "because Don Marquis's cockroach was incapable of operating the shift key of a typewriter, nobody else could operate it."

There was at least one point in which Archy happened to jump onto the shift lock key, a chapter titled "CAPITALS AT LAST".

Pete the Pup is another of Marquis' characters. Pete is a Boston Terrier with a passion for life and devotion to his "master". Like Marquis' other animal characters, Pete types his poetry at night on the author's typewriter (seldom capitalizing or using punctuation). Unlike many of the other characters' contributions, Pete writes about his uncomplicated life without strong political or social references.

== Publications ==
Collections of the "Archy" stories have been published and re-printed numerous times over the years, usually with all-lowercase titles. Titles in the series include:

- archy and mehitabel (1927)
- archy's life of mehitabel (1933)
- archy does his part (1935)
- the lives and times of archy and mehitabel (1940) (introduction by E. B. White)
- Archyology (1996)
- Archyology II (1998)
- The Annotated Archy and Mehitabel (2006)
- The Best of Archy and Mehitabel (2011)

Archyology and Archyology II were compiled and published for the first time in the late 1990s, with new illustrations by Ed Frascino. The Annotated Archy and Mehitabel was released in July 2006, edited by Michael Sims. The Best of Archy and Mehitabel is an abbreviated version of The Lives and Times of Archy and Mehitabel.

== Adaptations in other media ==
A musical version of the Archy and Mehitabel materials was recorded July 7, 1953, and April 9, 1954, entitled archy and mehitabel with Carol Channing as Mehitabel and Eddie Bracken as Archy, and narrated by David Wayne, with Percival Dove as Bill, the fierce tomcat. It was followed by echoes of archy, narrated by David Wayne, recorded August 31, 1954. The credits read: Words—Joe Darion, Music—George Kleinsinger. It was originally released as Columbia Masterworks ML 4963 in 1955, and was re-released on CD, combined with the unrelated work Carnival of the Animals, featuring Noël Coward reading the Ogden Nash poems, as part of the Columbia Masterworks series.

The music and lyrics from the album were the basis of a short-lived 1957 loud and brassy Broadway musical titled Shinbone Alley, starring Eddie Bracken as Archy and Eartha Kitt as Mehitabel. It was based on the columns and on the Columbia Masterworks album, but with additional music by Kleinsinger and dialogue by Mel Brooks.

On May 16, 1960, an abridged version of the musical was broadcast under the original title archy & mehitabel as part of the syndicated TV anthology series Play of the Week presented by David Susskind. The cast included Bracken, Tammy Grimes, and Jules Munshin.

Some of the songs from the album were used in 1971 in an animated film, also called Shinbone Alley. Directed by John Wilson, produced by Preston M. Fleet (the creator of Fotomat and Omnimax), and starring Eddie Bracken and Carol Channing, it was not a commercial success.

Actor Jeff Culbert toured a solo show to fringe festivals across North America during 2009 to 2011. The show, archy and mehitabel, was based on Archy's writings and involved Culbert playing the characters of Archy and Mehitabel.

American actor, singer, and clown Gale McNeeley traveled the United States in 2016 with his Archy and Mehitabel 100th Anniversary Tour. McNeeley's show featured in the introduction to editor Michael Sim's The Annotated Archy and Mehitabel by Penguin Classics. Lisa Dunseth, Program Manager of Book Arts & Special Collections at San Francisco's Main Library said of McNeeley, "His 100th Anniversary Tour is the perfect opportunity to become a fan, if you aren't already, and enjoy the still-funny and sometimes wicked humor of Don Marquis's famous cockroach and infamous cat."

Composer Gabriel Lubell wrote a work for baritone, clarinet, cello, and piano called Archy Speaks (2009). The work sets four of the original poems to music.

== In popular culture ==
- In the 3 August 2007 issue of the academic journal Science, an editorial was run claiming to be written by Mehitabel commenting on a recent paper about the domestication of cats.
- American singer-songwriter Jolie Holland included a song titled "Mehitabel's Blues" on her 2006 album Springtime Can Kill You.
- Montreal indie rock band Parlovr features a song titled "Archy and Mehitabel" on its eponymous 2008 album.
- Archy and Mehitabel make an appearance of sorts in the Preston & Child novel Verses for the Dead featuring Agent Pendergast, released 31 December 2018.
- In the fantasy TV series Once Upon a Time, Storybrooke character Jiminy Cricket is the town psychologist (as in the conscience), and his name is Archie Hopper, both a tribute to this Archy and that he's a cricket.
- In the 2004 novel The Grim Grotto by Lemony Snicket, Archy and Mehitabel are mentioned as parts of a set of submarines named after writers and literary characters.
- In Dafydd ab Hugh and Brad Linaweaver's 1995 novelization of the video game Doom, the main character Fly quoted Mehitabel as having said to Archie "wotthehell, wotthehell".
- The American poet Marge Piercy refers to the characters in her poem "Mehitabel & me".
- The 1960 Nero Wolfe mystery novel Too Many Clients, by Rex Stout, features a scene where Wolfe's assistant Archie Goodwin considers sending out Christmas cards signed “Archie and Mehitabel,” implying that his (non-existent) wife's name is Mehitabel.
- Mehitabel is mentioned in a conversation between Mutt and Jeff in Kim Stanley Robinson’s 2017 speculative fiction novel New York 2140
- The 2026 DC Comics limited series Batman and Robin Year One - Dynamic Duos introduces a street cat belonging to Catwoman named Mehitabel wich inspires a young thief girl to pick up the same name.
