= Voyage to the Outer Planets =

Early multimedia experiment

Voyage to the Outer Planets was an early multimedia experiment, first presented in 1973, combining Omnimax film, 70 mm film and planetarium special effects. The special effects and stills on standard and zoom equipped slide projectors were provided by the Reuben H. Fleet Space Theater, and their Spitz Space Transit Simulator (STS). The large format footage was provided by Graphic Films. The presentation was mostly multimedia, with short clips of the planets and spacecraft.

The production was to portray a crewed mission to the outer planets in the year 2348, a year in which the planets would be in a favorable alignment permitting such a three-year journey of exploration.

It transpired that the Space Theater was still under construction, with equipment months from installation, and there was no way of viewing finished or full format test footage before the theater opened. Beyond that, it was infeasible to film in directly the Imax format which would be used for projection. The crew were therefore obliged to film in smaller format (65 mm eight-perf) for later optical blowup and projection to a screen image magnification 600 times the size of the camera negative.

== Credits ==
Executive Producer	Preston Fleet
Director of Planetarium Media	Michael Sullivan
Producers	Lester Novros and George Casey
Written and directed by	Colin Cantwell
Planetarium Production	Joseph Herrington, George Marchyshyn, John P. Mulligan, Greg Paris
Music	Paul Novros
Artwork	Don Moore
Camera	James Connor
Special Effects Camera	John Dykstra
Models	Colin Cantwell
Optical printing	Film Effects
Narration	Gene McGarr
Surround Mix	Glen Glenn Sound
