= Shinbone Alley =

- Music: George Kleinsinger
- Lyrics: Joe Darion
- Book: Joe Darion; Mel Brooks
- Basis: Don Marquis's New York Tribune columns Archy and Mehitabel
- Productions: 1957 Broadway; 1960 US television 2005 Melbourne, Australia; 2006 Musicals, Tonight; 2026 Philadelphia Fringe Festival

Shinbone Alley (sometimes performed as archy & mehitabel) is a musical with a book by Joe Darion and Mel Brooks, lyrics by Darion, and music by George Kleinsinger. Based on the album Archy and Mehitabel: A Back-Alley Opera, which in turn was based on archy and mehitabel, a series of New York Tribune columns by Don Marquis (illustrated by Krazy Kat author George Herriman), it focuses on poetic cockroach Archy (who wasn't strong enough to depress the typewriter's shift-key), alley cat Mehitabel, and her relationships with theatrical cat Tyrone T. Tattersall and tomcat Big Bill, under the watchful eye of the newspaperman, the voice-over narrator and only human being in the show.

== Productions and background ==
The project began in 1954 as a Columbia Records concept album with Marquis' original title, featuring Eddie Bracken, Carol Channing, and David Wayne. That same year a concert version was presented by the Little Orchestra Society at The Town Hall in New York City. With an expanded book, the addition of several lengthy ballet sequences, and a cast of animal characters, the rechristened Shinbone Alley preceded Cats by a couple of decades and was a precursor of the far more successful Andrew Lloyd Webber hit. It was one of the first Broadway shows to feature a fully integrated cast.

The original Shinbone Alley was in Manhattan.

With neither an out-of-town tryout nor a preview period, the Broadway production opened on April 13, 1957, at The Broadway Theatre, and closed on May 25, 1957, after 49 performances. Following "creative differences" with the writers and producers, original director Norman Lloyd requested that his name be removed from the credits. The production was supervised by Sawyer Falk and choreographed by Joe and Rod Alexander, with production design by Eldon Elder, costumes by Motley, and lighting by Tharon Musser. The cast featured Bracken, reprising his role as archy, Eartha Kitt as mehitabel, Erik Rhodes as tyrone, and George S. Irving as big bill. Supporting players included Cathryn Damon, Jacques d'Amboise, Ross Martin, Lillian Hayman, and Allegra Kent. Relative newcomer Chita Rivera was Kitt's standby. The show's sole Tony Award nomination was for Best Costume Design. In lieu of a cast album recorded in a studio, a tape of a live performance was transferred to acetate and released on the Legend label.

In 2005 the musical had its Australian premiere in Melbourne, under the name archy & mehitabel. Produced by Magnormos, it was directed by Aaron Joyner and starred Jane Badler in the role of mehitabel, and Michael Lindner as archy. The "Musicals Tonight!" series presented a staged concert version in November 2006 in New York City. The musical will be presented also under the archy & mehitabel title as part of the 2026 Philadelphia Fringe Festival on September 19, 2026, starring Jayson Borenstein as archy (who is also producing and directing) and Julia Germer as mehitabel.

=== Current licensing ===
Licensing and performance rights are being held by Music Theatre International, under the archy & mehitabel title.

== Film and TV adaptations ==
On May 16, 1960, an abridged version of the musical was broadcast under the original title archy & mehitabel as part of the syndicated TV anthology series Play of the Week presented by David Susskind. The cast included Bracken, Tammy Grimes, and Jules Munshin.

Bracken and Channing reunited to provide the voices for the Allied Artists animated feature film in 1971, Shinbone Alley, directed by John David Wilson for Fine Arts Films.

== Characters ==
- archy: The cockroach with a soul. Often worrisome to the point of pessimism. Must follow his calling to write. Acts as a sort of protective, father-figure to Mehitabel out of his love for her.
- mehitabel: The Queen of Shinbone Alley. A free soul who loves life, she is tough and short tempered. Boy crazy but secretly longs to find that one special companion.
- Big Bill: Tough. Mean. Brave. The one-eyed terror of Shinbone Alley who falls in love with Mehitabel and then leaves her when she is pregnant.
- Tyrone T. Tattersall: The actor cat. A big ham and true artist who thinks the tradition of theatre and art is dying. Snobbish, pompous, and easily annoyed.
- The Newspaperman: The narrator of the story and Archy's boss at the newspaper. This unseen character both prompts and provokes Archy. An omniscient voiceover.

== Casts ==
	Concept Recording (1954)	Concert Debut (1954)	Broadway (1957)	Television Special (1960)	Concert Revival (1969)	Australia (2005)	Musicals Tonight! (2006)	Philadelphia Fringe Festival (2026)
archy	Eddie Bracken	Jonathan Anderson	Eddie Bracken		William Diehl	Michael Lindner	Lee Zarrett	Jayson Borenstein
mehitabel	Carol Channing	Mignon Dunn	Eartha Kitt	Tammy Grimes	Joanna Simon	Jane Badler	Allyson Tucker	Julia Germer
Big Bill	Percival Dove	Richard Sharretts	George S. Irving	Michael Kermoyan		Matt Hetherington	Trent Armand Kendall	Jordan Chall
Tyrone T. Tattersall			Erik Rhodes	Jules Munshin		David Gauci	Justin Sayre	Connor Shields
The Newspaperman	David Wayne	George Kleinsinger	Julian Barry	Quentin Reynolds	Henry Morgan	Robert Grubb		Kevin Naddeo
Rusty			Cathryn Damon	Sondra Lee				
Broadway			Ross Martin					

== Songs ==
=== Original Broadway ===
Act I

- Dance of the Cockroach - archy
- What Do We Care? - mehitabel and Ensemble
- Toujours Gai - mehitabel
- Queer Little Creature - mehitabel and archy
- Big Bill - Big Bill and Girls
- True Romance - mehitabel and Big Bill
- The Lightning Bug Song - archy
- I Gotta Be - Broadway and archy
- Dog And Cat Ballet - Ensemble
- Flotsam and Jetsam - archy and mehitabel
- Come to Mee-ow - Tyrone T. Tattersall
- Suicide Song - archy
- Shinbone Alley - Big Bill and Company

Act II

- The Song of the Moth - archy
- Vacant Lot Ballet - Ensemble
- A Woman Wouldn't Be A Woman - mehitabel and Ensemble
- The Lullaby - mehitabel and Girls
- Mehitabel's A House Cat - archy, Big Bill, Tyrone T. Tattersall
- Pretty Kitty - mehitabel and Girls
- Be a Pussycat - mehitabel
- The Lady Bug Song - Lady Bugs
- Flotsam and Jetsam (Reprise) - archy and mehitabel
- Shinbone Alley Finale - Company

=== Licensed Version ===
Act I

- Dance of the Cockroach - archy
- What Do We Care? - mehitabel and Ensemble
- Toujours Gai - mehitabel
- Queer Little Creature - mehitabel and archy
- The Song of the Bragging Flea - archy
- True Romance - mehitabel and Big Bill
- The Lightning Bug Song - archy
- Flotsam and Jetsam - archy and mehitabel
- Come to Mee-ow - Tyrone T. Tattersall
- Suicide Song - archy
- The Actor Cat - Tyrone T. Tattersall
- Shakespeare to a Beat - mehitabel and Tyrone T. Tattersall

Act II

- The Lullaby - mehitabel and Girls
- Pretty Kitty - mehitabel and Girls
- Quiet Street - archy
- The Lady Bug Song - Lady Bugs
- The Song of the Moth - archy
- Toujors Gai (Reprise) - archy and mehitabel
- Finale - mehitabel and Company

== Awards ==
=== Original Broadway Production ===
Year	Award	Category	Nominee	Result
1958	Tony Award	Best Costume Design	Motley Theatre Design Group	Nominated
