= Lester Novros =

American film director

- Born: January 27, 1909; Passaic, New Jersey, U.S.
- Died: September 10, 2000 (aged 91); Sherman Oaks, California, U.S.
- Other name: Les Novros
- Occupations: animator, teacher, artist
- Known for: animation
- Children: David Novros

Lester Novros (January 27, 1909 – September 10, 2000) was an American artist, animator, and teacher.

== Early life ==
Lester Novros was born in Passaic, New Jersey, on January 27, 1909. Novros studied painting at the National Academy of Design in New York City, was an active member of the Art Students League of New York and studied at the Prado Museum in Madrid, Spain.

== Career ==
His curiosity in the study of movement lead to an interest in motion pictures. In 1936, he was recruited by the Walt Disney Company to come to Hollywood to work on feature animation projects. Novros was an "inbetweener" on the 1937 Disney animated film Snow White and the Seven Dwarfs, and received a credit for art direction for the "Night on Bald Mountain" sequence of Fantasia (1940).

In 1941, Novros left Disney to form his own production company, Graphic Films. That same year, he joined the faculty of the Cinema Department of the University of Southern California. Thousands of students took his course on "Filmic Expression" before his retirement in 1984.

Novros taught USC filmic writing students.

Graphic Films found immediate success producing training films for the military during World War II. As the United States Air Force and NASA emerged in the post war period, Graphic's expertise in animating the visual dimensions of space exploration played a key role in interesting the United States Congress and the general public in supporting the country's first forays into space.

Among his many achievements, Novros may be most remembered as a pioneer in the large format and special venue film industries. Included in his filmography are numerous specialty films produced for World Fair Expositions, including several titles for the 1964 New York's World Fair, including Chemical Man for Abbott Laboratories, Reaching for the Stars for Lockheed Corporation, and Voyage to America for the United States Pavilion. However, it was the 10-perf, 70mm film To the Moon and Beyond, (produced for Cinerama Corporation) that caught the attention of filmmaker Stanley Kubrick, who soon enlisted the creativity of Novros and his special effects team in the creation of 2001: A Space Odyssey (1968).

Novros's interest in large format film technology led him to produce some of the first Imax/Omnimax films, for the Reuben H. Fleet Space Center in San Diego, California, including Voyage to the Outer Planets, Cosmos: the World of Loren Eisley and Tomorrow in Space (1982). In 1976, Novros won national acclaim and an Academy Award nomination for his documentary film Universe.

Novros's much sought after course at USC helped young filmmakers understand the relationship of color, light, movement and form as they specifically related to the film medium. Upon his retirement from USC, he continued to assemble his lectures into a textbook. Former student and friend George Lucas penned these words for the introduction of the manuscript: "The first time I truly understood the unique quality of film was when I took Les Novros' class. Stressing that film is a kinetic medium, Les has kept the Eisensteinian flame burning at USC, and it is a tradition that has strongly influenced my work."

== Death ==
At the age of 91, Novros died on September 10, 2000, in Sherman Oaks, California, after an extended illness. He was survived by his wife Esther (née Susswein) Novros and his children, including son David Novros.
