= Fox Photo =

Defunct American photography store chain

Fox Photo Inc. was an American chain of photo stores, which sold cameras, photographic equipment, and developed film.

The Fox company started as a small photo studio by a man named Arthur C. Fox in San Antonio, Texas. Carl Newton, a Canadian, moved to San Antonio and purchased the studio at the end of 1909 for $700 (equivalent to $21,111 in 2021), as amateur photography was in its infancy. Newton began what by 1920 was the largest mail order photofinishing business in the world.

Through acquisitions and mergers Fox Photo became Fox-Stanley Photo Products Inc. when it merged with the Stanley company in 1961. Carl Newton Jr. along with Stanley Wurtz of Stanley Photo (St. Louis based) expanded their primarily photofinishing based company to 23 states and eventually traded the public company stock on the NYSE.

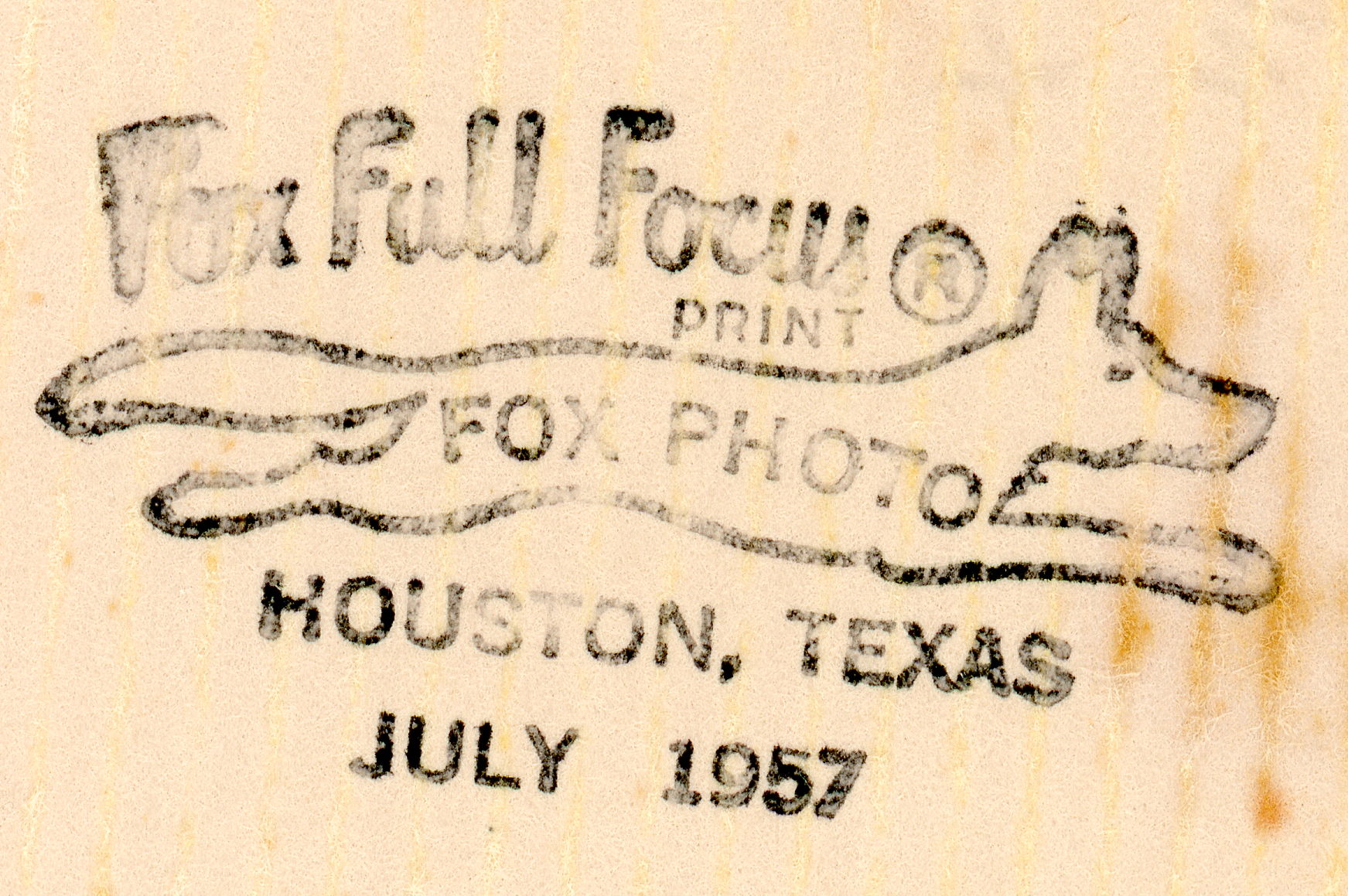
A Fox Photo label, on the back of a studio print, depicting the famous Fox logo.

Fox Photo operated retail stores and large commercial photofinishing plants where many large retail companies, including Wal-Mart, Target, K-Mart, and Walgreens along with many small drug stores sent their customers' photos to be processed.

Perhaps the most visible consumer-level facet of Fox Photo was the chain of one-hour processing booths that were established in shopping mall parking lots in the early-to-mid-1980s. These competed directly with the photo booths of Fotomat. In the chase scene(s) in Back to the Future, the Libyan terrorists crash their van into a Fox Photo booth at the Twin Pines/Lone Pine Mall.

Fox Stanley Photo Products Inc. was sold to Kodak in 1986. In 1987 Kodak sold the retail stores to interests whose principal was Carl Newton III. The large photofinishing plants were retained by Kodak and spun off to a Kodak company named Qualex.

Carl Newton III ran the retail stores branded as Fox Photo and continued the transition from camera stores and small drive up photo kiosks to Fox Photo One Hour Labs.

In 1991, Fox Photo was sold to St. Louis based CPI Corporation. CPI ran a division of retail one hour photo lab locations named, CPI Photo Finish.

CPI continued to operate locations under both names until 51 percent of this CPI division was sold to Kodak in 1999. The new company was named Fox Photo Inc. Kodak secured the remainder of the company from CPI Corp. one year later, only to sell Fox Photo to Wolf Camera of Atlanta Georgia, in 2001.

The name Fox Photo vanished when all of the stores were re-branded to Wolf Camera.

Wolf Camera went bankrupt in 2001 and was purchased by Beltsville, MD based Ritz Camera.

Ritz Camera filed for bankruptcy and was sold to a group of investors under the name RCI (Ritz Camera & Image) in 2009 and re-organized to a fraction of their stores, which once numbered at well over 1,000.
