= Universe (1976 film) =

1976 film

- Directed by: Lester Novros
- Written by: Lester Novros
- Produced by: Lester Novros
- Narrated by: William Shatner
- Cinematography: Ray Bloss; James Connor
- Edited by: David Elliott
- Music by: Paul Novros
- Distributed by: National Aeronautics and Space Administration
- Release date: 1976
- Running time: 27 minutes
- Country: United States
- Language: English

Universe is a 1976 American short documentary film directed by Lester Novros and narrated by William Shatner. It was nominated for an Academy Award for Best Documentary Short.
