= Albert Hibbs =

American mathematician and physicist (1924–2003)

Albert Roach Hibbs
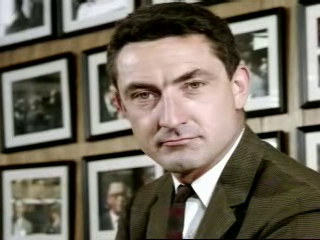
- Born: October 19, 1924; Akron, Ohio, U.S.
- Died: February 24, 2003 (aged 78); Pasadena, California, U.S.
- Education: California Institute of Technology (BS, PhD); University of Chicago (MS)
- Known for: "Voice of JPL" in 1960s, 1970s and 1980s
- Awards: Peabody Award (1963); Thomas Alva Edison Foundation National Media Award (1962, 1965); NASA Exceptional Service Medal (1984)
- Scientific career
- Fields: Mathematics, Physics, Science Communication
- Workplaces: NASA, JPL, U.S. Arms Control and Disarmament Agency (ACDA)
- Doctoral advisor: Richard Feynman

Albert Roach Hibbs (October 19, 1924 – February 24, 2003) was an American mathematician and physicist affiliated with the Jet Propulsion Laboratory (JPL). He was known as "The Voice of JPL" due to his gift for explaining advanced science in simple terms. He helped establish JPL's Space Science Division in 1960 and later served as its first chief. He was the systems designer for Explorer 1, the USA's first satellite, and helped establish the framework for exploration of the Solar System through the 1960s. Hibbs qualified as an astronaut in 1967 and was slated to be a crew member of Apollo 25, but he ultimately did not go to the Moon due to the Apollo program ending after the Apollo 17 mission in 1972.

== Education ==
Hibbs earned bachelor's degree in physics from the California Institute of Technology (Caltech) in 1945, having attended Caltech under the sponsorship of the US Navy's V-12 program. He then obtained a master's degree in mathematics from the University of Chicago in 1947.

While working as a staff member at JPL, in 1955 Hibbs received a PhD in physics from Caltech with a thesis on "The Growth of Water Waves Due to the Action of the Wind". His thesis advisor was the Nobel laureate Richard Feynman. Hibbs became close friends with Feynman and together they published the textbook Quantum Mechanics and Path Integrals (McGraw-Hill, 1965), which is still a standard reference on the path integral formulation.

== Career ==
Hibbs joined the Jet Propulsion Laboratory (JPL) in 1950. He became head of JPL's Research and Analysis Section, and in this role, he was the systems designer for America's first successful satellite, Explorer 1, in 1958. After NASA took over JPL in 1958, Hibbs worked to establish the framework for planetary missions for the next decade.

In 1960, Hibbs was placed in charge of forming and leading the Space Science Division at JPL. As the division became successful, Hibbs emerged as the "Voice of JPL".

From 1962 to 1967, Hibbs left JPL to work on special assignment as staff scientist for the Arms Control Study Group (ACSG) of the U.S. Arms Control and Disarmament Agency (ACDA), studying how arms-control treaties could be monitored from space.

From the late 1960s to the 1980s, he became the authoritative source of information on JPL missions, including: the Ranger and Surveyor missions to the Moon; the Mariner missions to Venus, Mars, and Mercury; the Viking missions to Mars; and the Voyager missions to the outer planets.

By the age of five, Hibbs had decided that he wanted to go to the Moon. He qualified as an astronaut in 1967, despite being 7 years over the age limit, and he was slated to be a crew member of Apollo 25. The Apollo program ended after Apollo 17, denying him his dream. Nevertheless, he has reflected that: "Even though I didn't make it to the moon, my machines did."

== Awards and honors ==
Hibbs hosted and produced several radio and television programs for adults and children. He won a Peabody award for the children's series Exploring, as well as two Thomas Alva Edison Foundation National Media Awards. He was also given NASA's Exceptional Service Medal, "for his outstanding achievements in explaining the complexities and significance of space exploration to the general public via radio and television," and the NASA Achievement Award.

As a prominent member of the Southern California Skeptics, Hibbs was awarded a Fellowship from the Committee for the Scientific Investigation of Claims of the Paranormal (CSICOP).

Hibbs also had an asteroid named after him (2441 Hibbs) in honor of Al Hibbs and his wife Marka as an acknowledgement of the role they played in introducing her to Space Science at Caltech.

== Other activities ==
In 1947, Hibbs and Roy Walford took time off from graduate and medical school, respectively, to go to Reno and Las Vegas to beat the casinos at roulette. Studying biases in the roulette wheels, they made profits variously estimated between $6,500 and $42,000. According to Hibbs himself, during an episode of You Bet Your Life on which he was a contestant and won $250, he made "about $12,000" from his roulette exploits. The pair used the profits to spend over a year sailing around the Caribbean aboard a 40-foot sailboat, Adonde.

While working for JPL, Hibbs appeared on You Bet Your Life where he talked about his adventures in roulette.

Hibbs was a member of the project review committee for Biosphere 2 from 1987 to 1992 and was involved in artist Tom Van Sant's Geosphere Project from 1989 to 1995 as a member of the Eyes on Earth Board of Directors. In his retirement, Hibbs pursued underwater photography at sites all over the world.

Hibbs enjoyed making kinetic sculpture as a hobby and was fascinated by miniaturised, independently operating machines—a field where he once again collaborated in a well known idea-experiment of Feynman's. According to Feynman, it was Hibbs who originally suggested to him (circa 1959) the idea of a medical use for Feynman's theoretical micromachines (see nanotechnology). Hibbs suggested that certain repair machines might one day be reduced in size to the point that it would, in theory, be possible to (as Feynman put it) "swallow the doctor".

== Personal life ==
Hibbs first married in 1950, to Florence Pavin, with whom he had two children. He was widowed in 1970. In 1971, he married Marka Oliver.

He died in February 2003 from complications following heart surgery at Huntington Memorial Hospital in Pasadena, California.
