= Stanley, the Ugly Duckling =

- Written by: Norman Martin; Lee Pockriss
- Directed by: John David Wilson
- Starring: Susan Blu; Jack DeLeon; Wolfman Jack; Brian Cummings; Lee Thomas; Rick Dees; Julie McWhirter
- Theme music composer: Norman Martin; Lee Pockriss
- Country of origin: United States
- Original language: English

Production
- Executive producer: Steve Binder
- Producer: John David Wilson
- Running time: 27 min.
- Production company: Fine Arts Films

Original release
- Network: ABC
- Release: May 1, 1982

Stanley, the Ugly Duckling, a.k.a. Stanley, is an animated American television special that was produced by Fine Arts Films and aired on May 1, 1982 as part of ABC's Weekend Special lineup followed by a primetime airing later that night. It is loosely based on the 19th-century fairy tale The Ugly Duckling by Hans Christian Andersen.

== Voices ==
- Susan Blu - Stanley
- Jack DeLeon - Nathan the fox
- Wolfman Jack - Eagle One
- Rick Dees - D.J.

=== Additional voices ===
- Brian Cummings
- Lee Thomas
- Julie McWhirter

== Songs ==
- "Not a Duck" – Sung by Stanley
- "A Little Traveling Music Please" – Sung by Nathan and Stanley
- "Do Something Terrible Today" – Sung by Eagle One and the Hell's Eagles
- "I Like Myself" – Sung by Nathan and Stanley

== Home video releases ==
Stanley was given its first American VHS release by Image Magnetic Associates in 1984. It was later re-released in 1992 by Family Home Entertainment, and more recently in 2005 by Lionsgate Home Entertainment.
