= To the Moon and Beyond =

Film

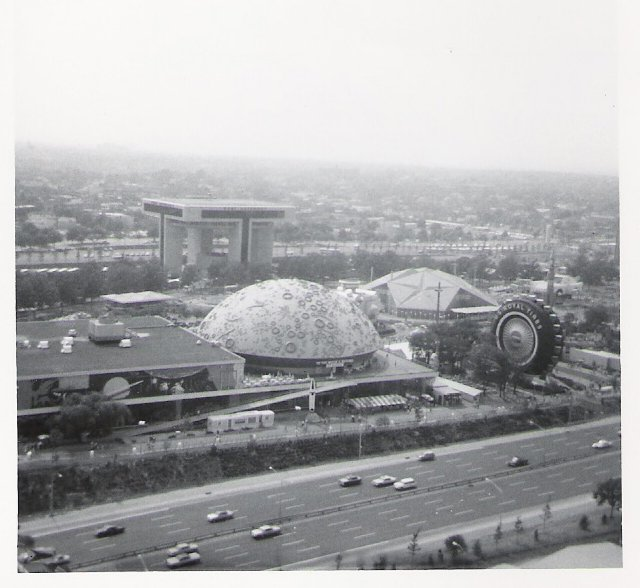
1964 New York World's Fair with the "Moon Dome" of To The Moon and Beyond in the foreground

To The Moon and Beyond is a special motion picture produced for and shown at the 1964/1965 New York World's Fair. It depicted traveling from Earth out to an overall view of the universe and back again, zooming down to the atomic scale. It was filmed in a Cinerama process using a camera with a single fisheye lens and projected onto a dome screen.

== Description ==
The film was made in a format called "The New CINERAMA - 360 Process" It was shown in a 96-foot-high "Moon Dome" that was part of Transportation and Travel building (Pavilion No. 123) in the Transportation section of the Fair and was presented by KLM Royal Dutch Airlines. The film was narrated by Rod Serling.

== Production ==
Felix Bednarz designed the Cinerama 360 lens for Fairchild-Curtis (US 3,230,826 [1961])

The film was created using Cinerama 360° - a process that recorded on 70mm film at 18 fps using a fish-eye wide angle lens. It was projected in a domed theater using a similar wide angle projector. The film was made by Graphic Films Corporation, a company run by former Disney animator Lester Novros who had been making technical films for NASA, the US Air Force, and various aerospace clients.

== Influences on 2001: A Space Odyssey ==
Stanley Kubrick saw the film at the Fair and was so impressed by its special effects and accurate depiction of scientifically based material that he hired Graphic Films as a design consultant on a film he already had in pre-production, 2001: A Space Odyssey. Graphic Films' Lester Novros, Con Pederson, and background artist Douglas Trumbull would air-mail research based concept sketches and notes covering the mechanics and physics of space travel to Kubrick in England during pre-production. They would go on to create storyboards for a portion of the space flight sequences seen in the film. Trumbull would eventually leave Graphic Films to become a special effects supervisor on 2001.
