= Preston Fleet =

Preston Mitchell Fleet (February 26, 1934 – January 31, 1995), nicknamed Sandy, was the founder of Fotomat. Fotomat was a once-widespread retail chain of photo development drive-thru kiosks located in shopping center parking lots. He was a son of aerospace pioneer Reuben H. Fleet.

Fleet co-founded WD-40 in 1953, then went on to co-found Fotomat in San Diego, California, in 1965; the first kiosk was opened in Point Loma in 1965). The company went public in 1971 and was listed on the New York Stock Exchange (NYSE) in 1977. At its peak around 1980 there were over 4,000 Fotomats throughout the United States, primarily in suburban areas. Fotomats were distinctive for their pyramid-shaped gold-colored roofs and signs with red-lettering, usually positioned in a large parking area, such as a supermarket or strip mall, as the Fotomat huts required a minimal amount of land and were able to accommodate cars driving up to drop off or pick up film.

He was a co-founder of San Diego's Reuben H. Fleet Science Center and Space Museum. He helped design the Science Center to have a special movie projector, Omnimax, housed in a dome wall and ceiling that makes the audience feel as if they are moving like the camera did when filming. A decade earlier he had been a founding director of the San Diego Air and Space Museum.

Fleet's hobbies were aviation and playing theater organs. He was for a time the president of the American Theatre Organ Society.

Film Credits

- Chronos (Consulting Producer)
- Shinbone Alley (Producer)
- Run If You Can (Executive Producer)
- Cabaret (film) (Producer)
- The Man Who Would Be King (Producer)
