= Shinbone Alley (film) =

- Theatrical release poster
- Directed by: John David Wilson
- Screenplay by: Joe Darion
- Based on: Archy and Mehitabel by Don Marquis; Shinbone Alley by Joe Darion Mel Brooks George Kleinsinger
- Produced by: Preston M. Fleet
- Starring: Carol Channing; Eddie Bracken; Alan Reed; John Carradine; Hal Smith; Joan Gerber; Ken Sansom; Sal Delano
- Narrated by: Byron Kane
- Edited by: Warner E. Leighton
- Music by: George Kleinsinger
- Production company: Fine Arts Films
- Distributed by: Allied Artists
- Release dates: June 26, 1970 (ATLFF); April 7, 1971
- Running time: 85 minutes
- Country: United States
- Language: English

Shinbone Alley is a 1970 American independent animated musical comedy film based on the Joe Darion, Mel Brooks, and George Kleinsinger musical of the same name as well as the original Archy and Mehitabel stories by Don Marquis. It was directed by John David Wilson. Eddie Bracken reprised his role from the Broadway musical; Carol Channing played the starring role originally performed by Eartha Kitt.

== Plot ==
A New York City poet named Archy (Eddie Bracken) attempts suicide, only to come back as a cockroach. As he learns how to write poetry by hopping on typewriter keys, he grows used to his new life and becomes infatuated with Mehitabel (Carol Channing), a singing alley cat who goes out with tomcat Big Bill (Alan Reed). When Big Bill dumps Mehitabel, Archy confronts her about her wild ways in general and her affinity for bad-boy tomcats in particular. She momentarily agrees, but self-appointed theatre maestro cat Tyrone T. Tattersall (John Carradine) promises to make her a star and becomes her next lover. Archy attempts and fails suicide again. In the theater, Mehitabel holds up her end of the deal in getting food for Tyrone, but he kicks her off the stage. Archy and Big Bill watch her, and Mehitabel gets back together with Big Bill. Back to his typewriter, Archy channels his frustration by calling the other insects and spiders to revolution. He immediately drops the scheme when he hears the news that Mehitabel has kittens and that Big Bill has left the scene again. It's a rainy evening, and Archy points out to Mehitabel that her kittens, who are inside a coverless trash can, are floating away from her; the two rescue the kittens, but moody Mehitabel chases Archy away for interfering with her private business. Archy persuades Mehitabel to give up her life as an alley cat and support the kittens with a "job" as a house cat in an upscale residence.

Later, however, when Archy comes to visit her, she is visibly changed by the experience. She reminds him that social class now separates them from being friends, and she kicks him out—regretting it later. Archy gets drunk and meets several ladybug street walkers who find his love poems about Mehitabel. Big Bill makes fun of him. One day, Mehitabel returns to Shinbone Alley and sings and dances again like her old self. After having tried to reform her, Archy realizes he liked Mehitabel for her wild ways all along and accepts her for "being what she has to be," content to be just friends. Meanwhile, Mehitabel and Big Bill playfully chase each other.

== Voice cast ==
- Carol Channing ... Mehitabel
- Eddie Bracken ... Archy
- Alan Reed ... Big Bill
- John Carradine ... Tyrone T. Tattersall
- Hal Smith ... Freddie the Rat / Prissy Cat
- Joan Gerber ... Penelope the Fat Cat / Ladybugs of the Evening
- Ken Sansom ... Rosie the Cat
- Julie Dawn Cole ... Sally the Cat
- Sal Delano... Beatnik Spider
- Byron Kane ... Newspaperman

== Production ==
In 1968, the film began pre-production, with meetings between the producers (Preston Fleet & John Wilson) and the writers (Dick Kinney, Marty Murphy, & David Detiege), they decided to take heavy inspiration from the writing and illustrations of Archy and Mehitabel, to set up a "visual jazz experience". But to them, this presented a problem, and midway into pre-production the thought occurred to modernize the George Herriman illustrations in a contemporary style. Storyboards were drawn by Richard Kinney and Marty Murphy. In 1969, the designs of the characters were finalized, and animation and voice acting soon began.

In 1970, a year before the film's theatrical release, it was screened at the Atlanta Georgia International Film Festival and won a Golden Phoenix Award.

The film's theatrical trailer from 1970

== Reception ==
Shinbone Alley did not fare well at the box office. However, New York magazine critic Judith Crist called it "a blend of literature, musical comedy and fine arts... pure sophisticated entertainment for all, and a refreshment for moviegoers." Vincent Canby, in his New York Times review, wrote: "'Shinbone Alley' is a little like the old mehitabel. It suffers from split personality being based, as it is, on works that must go over the heads of 8-year-olds .. but it's executed in a mostly juvenile style that's not too far removed from what the children see on television. It's a very mixed bag and this, in case you hadn't guessed, is a very mixed review."
