= John David Wilson =

English artist, animator and producer

- Born: 7 August 1919; Wimbledon, London, England
- Died: 20 June 2013 (aged 93); Blackpool, Lancashire, England
- Occupations: Animator; Producer
- Website: http://www.fineartsfilms.com/

John David Wilson (7 August 1919 – 20 June 2013) was an English artist, animator and producer. He owned his own production studio, Fine Arts Films.

== Early years ==
Wilson was born on 8 August 1919 in Wimbledon, England. He was educated at the Watford Grammar School for Boys, Harrow Art School and the Royal College of Art; among his teachers was Robin Darwin.

== World War II ==
During World War II, Wilson served with the London Rifle Brigade. He was badly wounded in the African Campaign in 1941; while recuperating in Cairo he spent time drawing cartoons. Some of these were brought to the attention of a printer in Durban who offered him a job; due to the seriousness of his injury he was discharged from the army and accepted the job.

== Death ==
He died in Blackpool, England in 2013. In his last years, he had suffered from Alzheimer's disease.

== Credits ==
=== Film ===
- Great Expectations (1946)
- Peter Pan (1953)
- Lady and the Tramp (1955)
- Journey to the Stars (shown at The 1962 Seattle World's Fair) (1962)
- The Early Birds (1968)
- Shinbone Alley (1970)
- Casey at the Bat (1976)
- Grease (1978) (titles)
- You Gotta Serve Somebody (1983)
- FernGully: The Last Rainforest (1992)

=== Television ===
- Mr. Magoo (TV series) (1953)
- Petrushka (segment on Sol Hurok Music Hour) (1956)
- Exploring (1964–1966)
- The Sonny and Cher Show (TV series) (1970–73)
- The Carol Burnett Show (TV series) (1972–76)
- COS w/Bill Cosby (TV series) (1976)
- Stanley, the Ugly Duckling (TV show) (1982)
- Peter Pan and the Pirates (TV show) (1990)
- Space Cats (TV show) (1991)
- The Specialists (TV show) (1992)
- Madeline (TV show) (1994)
