= Exploring (TV series) =

Production
- Production company: NBC News

Original release
- Network: NBC
- Release: October 13, 1962 – April 9, 1966

Exploring is a Saturday morning children's educational series in color that appeared on NBC television on Saturday afternoons from October 13, 1962 to April 9, 1966. The NBC News series, which was nominated for an Emmy Award in 1964 and won a Peabody Award in 1963, featured segments about science and the arts. The series was hosted by Dr. Albert Hibbs, a scientist and educator.

Mary Ritts and Paul Ritts were puppeteers on the show; Paul performed Albert, Calvin and Sir Geoffrey, while Mary played Magnolia.

Besides the Ritts puppets, the series also featured short films, animated versions of famous legends (by John David Wilson), and music Millard Research Associates produced a printed copy of their survey results which found over 600,000 Exploring Teachers Guides were requested for teachers in major school districts all across the country (they were free). A Millard survey found 86% of the teachers requesting the Guides were assigning the Saturday morning program for family viewing. This was the first instance of proving you could change ratings with Teachers Guides. This was done again on CBS with the Teachers Guides to the 21st Century (Young and Rubicon researched this) and later on PBS.
