= The Specialists (TV series) =

Animated television series

The Specialists is an animated television series that appeared on the second season of MTV's Liquid Television in 1992. It was created and directed by Joe Horne, creator of the previous MTV series The Adventures of Stevie and Zoya and a director on The Boondocks.

== Overview ==
The feel of The Specialists was described as "a dual takeoff on Japanese anime and Mission: Impossible". The plot revolved around three "invincibly inept" detectives for hire: the group's leader Mastermind, who wore a white Nehru jacket and as his name implied was the brains of the operation; Kitka, a female escape artist who wore a skintight blue tuxedo and had blue hair and skin; and Samson, a large, muscular man in a black suit. Their many foes during the 10 three-minute episodes included an evil clown, an intergalactic poodle conspiracy, an evil genius (and rival of Mastermind's) named Dr. Raoul Dendrite and his schoolgirl-uniformed assistant Delilah, and Negator, who subdued his opponents with a highly sarcastic wit (and aided by a Don Rickles mask).

== Series credits ==
As they appeared on the second season closing credits of Liquid Television:

- Artists: Kathee Boyle, Bob Bransford, Rachel Brenner, Rudy Cataldi, Consuelo Cataldi, Charlotte Clark, Christian Coey, Allyn Conley, Josephine Contreras, Laura Craig, Fred Crippen, Else Cruz, Kikki Elder, Derek Eversfield, David Fassett, Adrianna Galvez, Karen Hansen, Nicolette Harley, Joe Horne, Carlos Huante, Chris Jenkyns, James Krembs, Karen Locke, Max Madrid, Kent Newberry, Lisa O'Loughlin, Georgia Patterson, Walt Peregoy, Rumen Petkov, Peggy Pickett, Greg Ray, Dan Reed, Dene Ann Ross, Debrah Rykoff, Penelope Sevier, Cynthia Surage, Albert Taylor, Richard Williams, Bianca Wilson, John Wilson
- Everybody Else: Fifun Amini, Anderson Video, Walter Barnett, John Capodice, Brian Chin, Matt Crippen, Chayse Dacoda, Devonshire Studios, Andrew Dimitroff, J. Francis, Lisa Fuson, Ron Harris, Stefanie Harris, James Hong, Tony Lark, Thierry Laurin, Mike Mancini, Richard Nesbitt, Pantomime Pictures, Jim Pollack, Riverton Studios, Beau Starr, Mike Starr, Studio Z Productions, Chris Takami, Joe Trueba, Kurt Weldon, Josh Winget, Donald Zappala
