= Qualex =

Photographic processing company

Qualex Inc. was the largest wholesale and on-site photographic processing company in the world. It was formed in March 1988 as a joint venture between Eastman Kodak and Fuqua Industries, but became a wholly owned subsidiary of Kodak in 1994. It was headquartered in Durham, North Carolina. Qualex operated a large network of commercial and in-store labs throughout the United States and Canada.

Qualex's business slowed from the overall decline in traditional film photography in favor of digital photography. Qualex once operated 53 photo processing laboratories; that number had shrunk to 22 by June 2004, and the company saw further consolidation. Qualex, however, continued to service over 13,000 on-site retail processing locations. On December 18, 2008, Qualex announced that it was shuttering all of its film processing facilities, essentially ending send-out film developing by Kodak. However, their Event Imaging Solutions division remained.

March 27, 2009 was the company's last day for send-in photofinishing, while March 30, 2009 was the last day for Internet orders, and that day marked the end of Qualex's photofinishing.
