= Fotomat =

Drive through photo developing business

Fotomat Corporation
- Company type: Subsidiary
- Founded: 1965; 61 years ago in San Diego, California
- Founder: Preston Fleet
- Parent: Konishiroku Photo Industry (1986–2002); Viewpoint Corporation (from 2002)

Fotomat was an American retail chain of photo development drive-through kiosks located primarily in shopping center parking lots. Fotomat Corporation was founded by Preston Fleet in San Diego, California, in the 1960s, with the first kiosk opening in Point Loma, California, in 1965. Fotomat became a public company in 1971 and was listed on the New York Stock Exchange (NYSE) in 1977.

At its peak around 1980, there were over 4,000 Fotomats throughout the United States, primarily in suburban areas. Fotomats were distinctive for their pyramid-shaped gold-colored roofs and signs with blue and red lettering. Usually positioned in a large parking area, such as a supermarket or strip mall, the Fotomat huts required a minimal amount of land and were able to accommodate cars driving up to drop off or pick up film.

The service became increasingly obsolete by the late 1980s, and the kiosks went out of business. Many former Fotomat huts still exist, several having been converted into drive-thru coffee kiosks and other businesses.

== Photography services ==
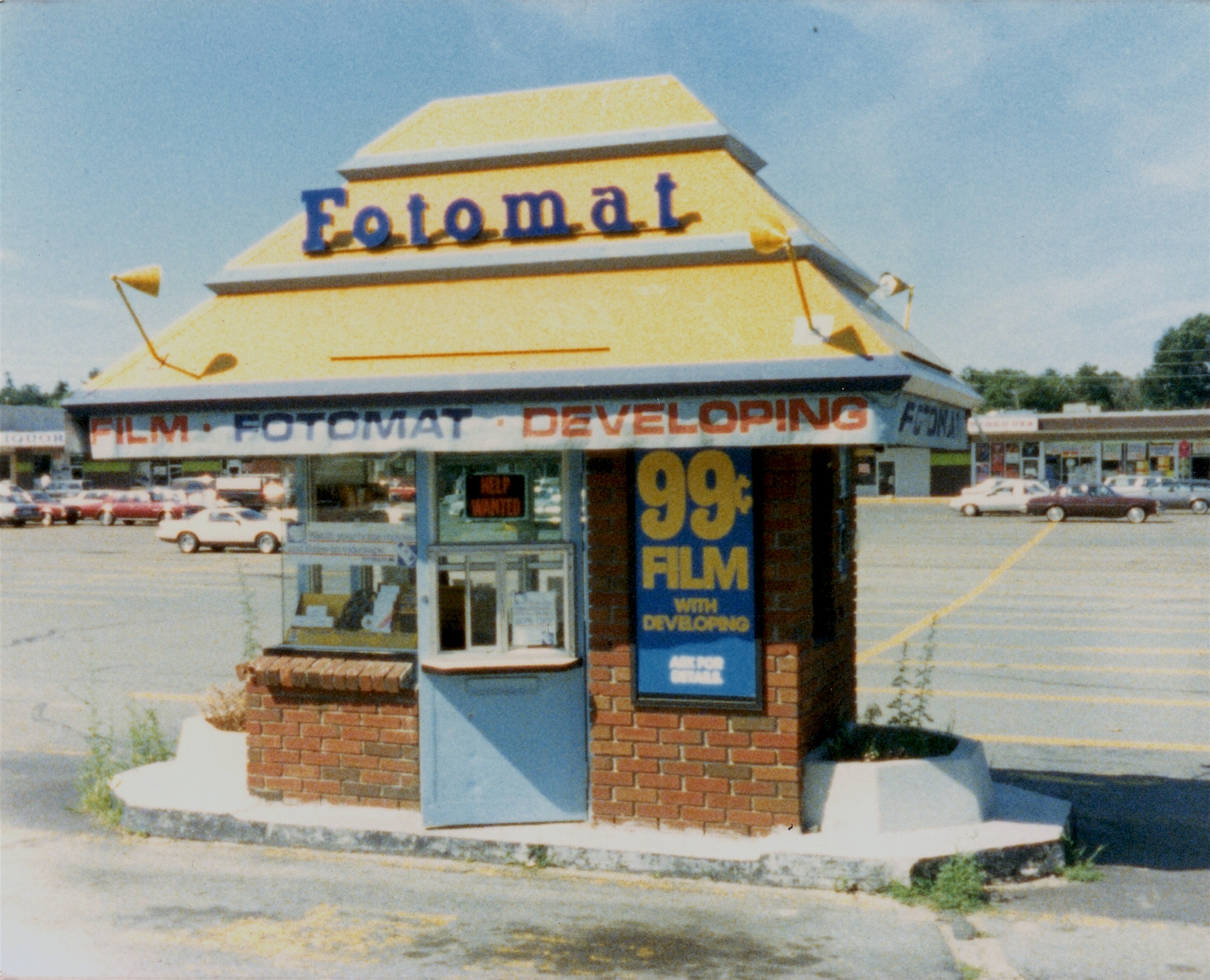
A Fotomat kiosk in Massachusetts in 1987

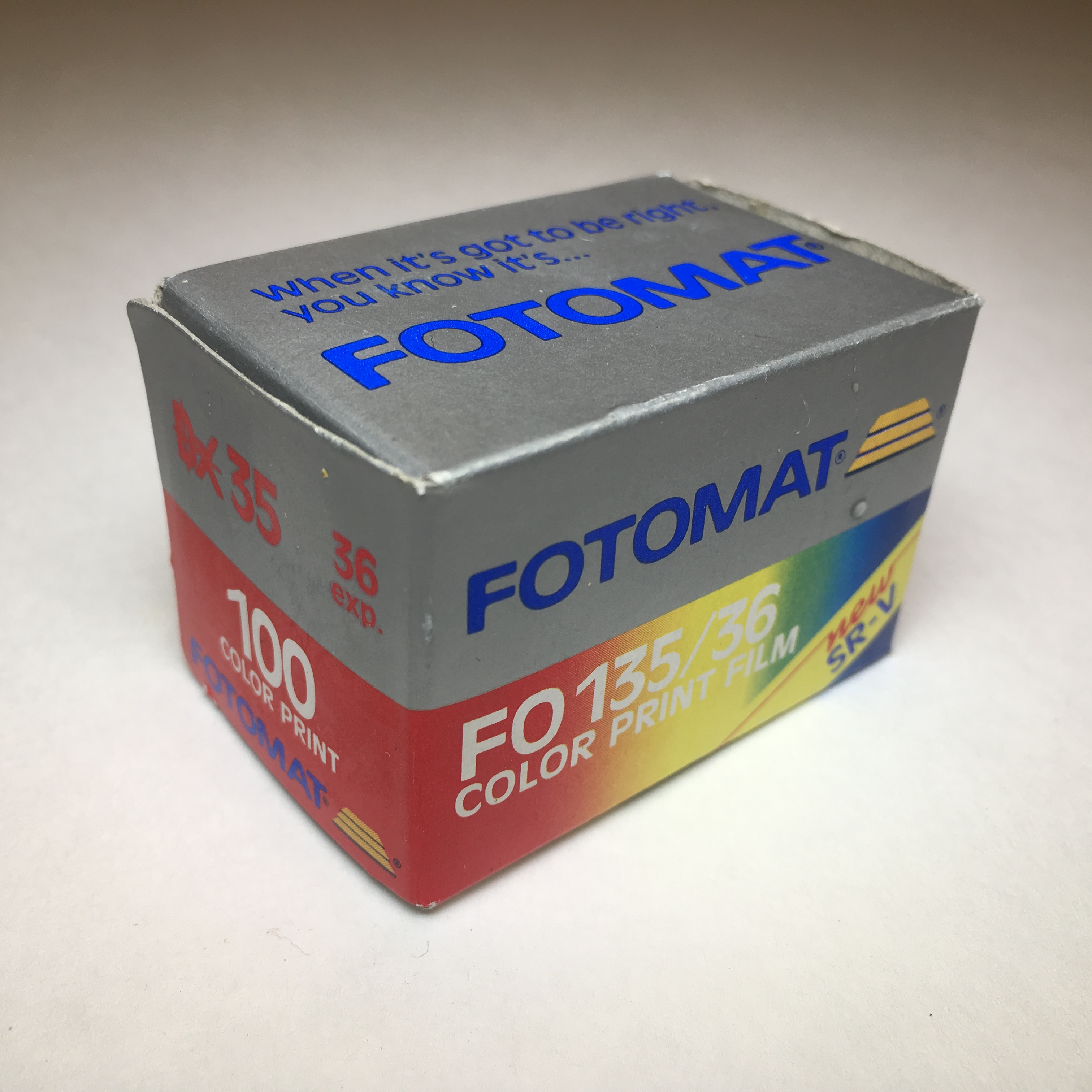
35mm Fotomat brand film, 1980s

Fotomat sold Kodak and Fotomat brand film, as well as other photography-related products, and offered overnight photo finishing. Many people assumed Fotomat was owned by Kodak, because of the yellow roofs and font similar to Kodak packaging. Fotomat also made filmstrips (35mm single frame) for school. When teachers wanted to have a custom captioned or sound filmstrip made, the teacher could use the Fotomat filmstrip development service, but teachers would have to take the pictures on blank 35mm single frame film and record the soundtrack on a cassette tape, then they would take them to the Fotomat booth, and the film and cassette tape would be sent to the Fotomat Lab to be produced.

Fotomat had both company-owned stores and franchises. This led to lawsuits between Fotomat and its franchisees over territories. Competitors of Fotomat included Foto Hut, Fox Photo, and Kodak itself.

Fotomat Corporation was acquired by Konishiroku Photo Industry Ltd., also known as Konica Photo Imaging, in 1986. Eventually, it was sold to Viewpoint Corporation in 2002.

The company's main product, overnight film development, was rendered noncompetitive by the early 1980s development of the minilab, which provided one-hour photo development and could be installed on-site without a large capital investment. After the introduction of digital cameras, overnight service eventually became obsolete, and Fotomat switched to online digital imaging at Fotomat.com where users could edit and store their images. This site ceased operations on September 1, 2009.

== Video rental service ==
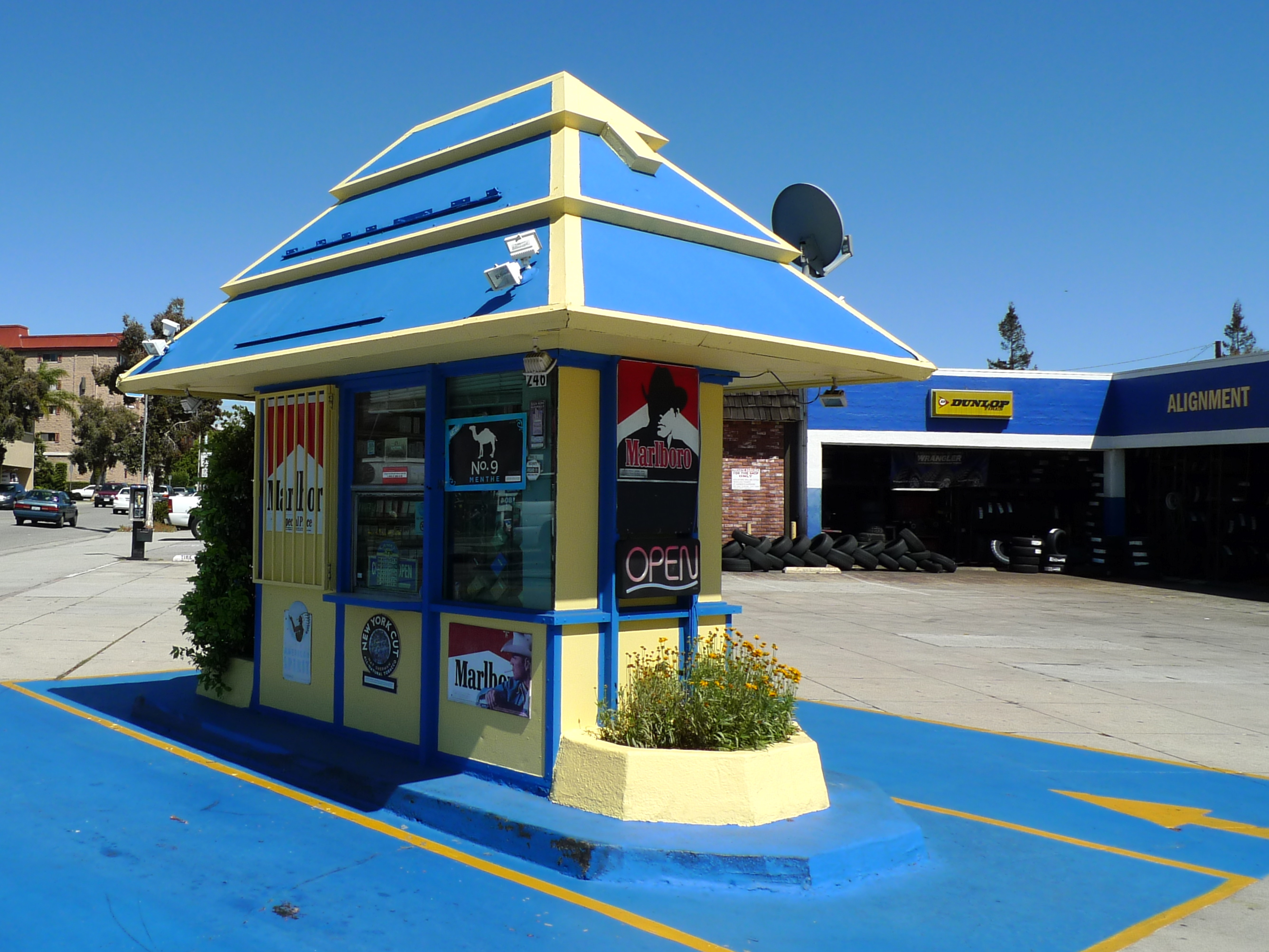
A former Fotomat kiosk in California, repainted and selling cigarettes in 2010

In addition to photo developing, Fotomat was one of the first companies to offer movies for rent on videocassette—a new concept then—starting in December 1979. Customers would browse through a small catalog, call a number, and order the movie or movies of their choice. The following day, the customer would pick up the cassette at the Fotomat kiosk of their choice. The rental cost was $12 per title (equivalent to $53 in 2025), and the customer could keep it for five days. The price was later reduced to $9.95 for a five-day rental. The service was called "Fotomat Drive-Thru Movies."

Initially, only Paramount Pictures entered into an agreement with the chain to offer their movies for rent. Fotomat also offered lesser-known titles from smaller distributors such as Brandon Chase's Group I Releasing and VCI from Tulsa, Oklahoma (one of the first independent video labels at the dawn of the format), but these releases would not be as prominently credited to these sources as the Paramount titles. Fotomat also carried certain exclusive releases, such as I Go Pogo. These titles were distributed directly by Fotomat and were of a uniform design with a black, die-cut cardboard case and a black label that included a white title (as well as Paramount's stylized logo for their films), but otherwise no artwork or color. In addition, a Fotomat logo accompanied by a four-tone sound would play before the start of each movie. The logo included an artistic representation of the company's yellow mansard roof.

On March 4, 1980, Walt Disney Home Entertainment began offering their first videos for rental through Fotomat. Later on, MCA struck a deal with Fotomat to distribute its titles through rental.

By 1982, local video stores had begun to offer customers cheaper video rentals without the overnight wait time, and Fotomat discontinued the service.
