= Fleet Science Center =

Science museum and planetarium in San Diego, United States

Coordinates: 32.730812°N 117.146971°W

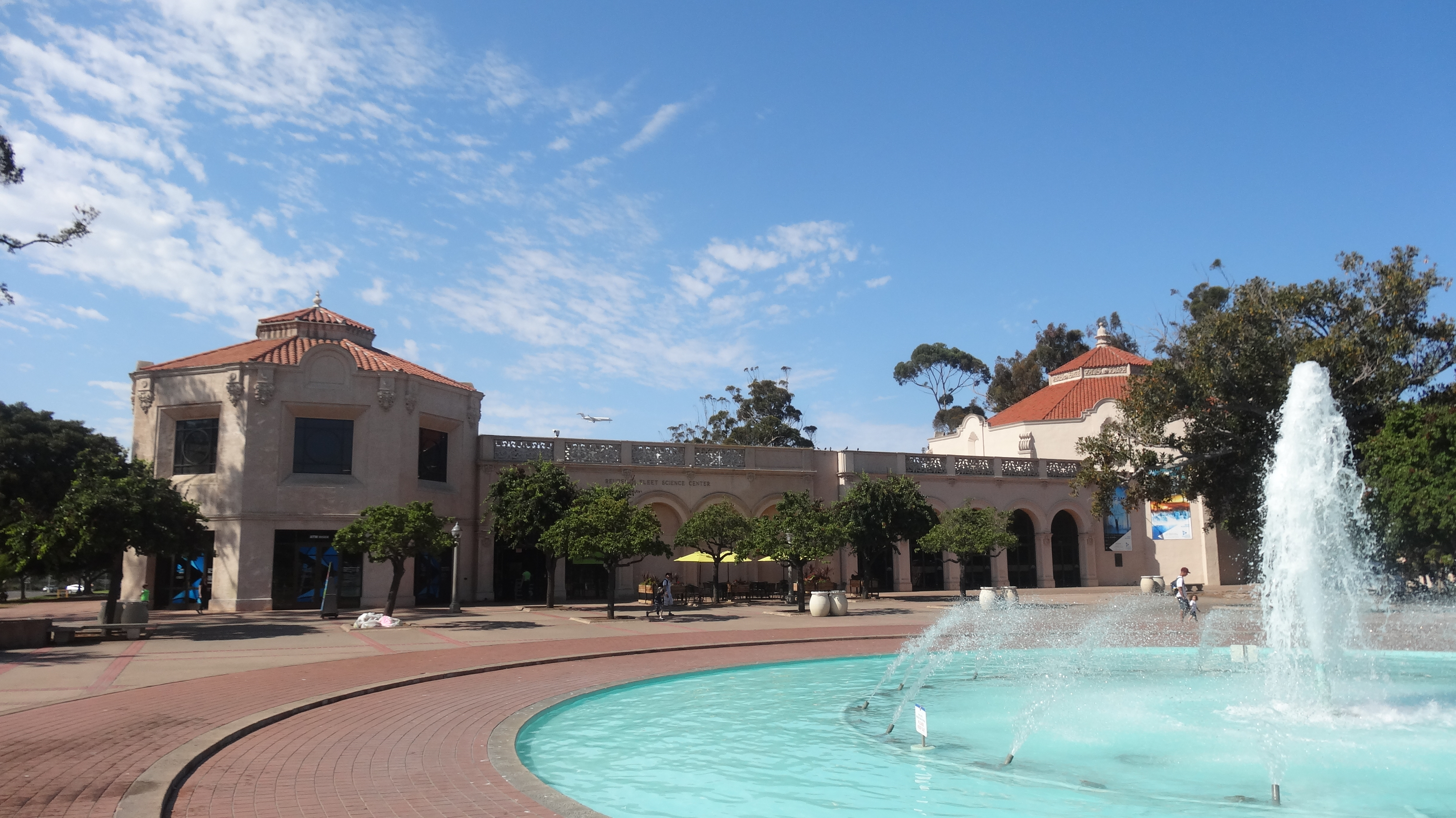

- Location within San Diego Location within California Location within the United States
- Established: 1973
- Location: 1875 El Prado Drive, Balboa Park, San Diego, California 92101
- Director: Steve Snyder
- Public transit access: SDMTS Buses: Local#7, Rapid#215, Trolley: City College Stop, transfer to #7
- Website: fleetscience.org

The Fleet Science Center is a science museum and planetarium in Balboa Park in San Diego, California. Established in 1973, it was the first science museum to combine interactive science exhibits with a planetarium and an IMAX Dome (OMNIMAX) theater, setting the standard that most major science museums follow today. It is located at the east end of the El Prado Drive walkway, next to the Bea Evenson Fountain and plaza in central Balboa Park.

== History ==
The facility is named for aviation pioneer Reuben H. Fleet, who founded the U.S. Air Mail service. Fleet's San Diego-based company, Consolidated Aircraft, built several of the famous aircraft of World War II, including the B-24 Liberator and PBY Catalina. Fleet and his family made the initial gift which established the Science Center.

=== Planetarium ===
Throughout the 1960s, the San Diego Hall of Science (later known as the San Diego Space and Science Foundation) was planning a new planetarium for San Diego's Balboa Park, with the possibility of an adjacent science hall. The site on Laurel Street opposite the San Diego Natural History Museum was reserved in 1963.

Original Spitz Laboratories planetarium projector array in Fleet Theater (installed 1974).

The planetarium incorporated several innovative features. It was to be used for both large-format film presentations and traditional planetarium shows. The 76-foot-diameter (23 m) dome would be tilted 25 degrees. The audience would be placed in tiered rows facing outward into the tilted dome to give the feeling of being suspended in space and looking forward, rather than looking upward into an overhead dome. The founders also wanted to eliminate the large dumbbell-shaped star projector used in traditional planetariums, which juts from the center of the room and blocks part of the view, and would interfere with the movies being projected onto the dome.

Current pair of Global Immersion GSX dual 4K projectors, for both planetarium shows and digital movies in Heikoff Dome Theater (installed 2012).

The San Diego Hall of Science approached Spitz Laboratories to create a new type of star projector that would not obstruct the view for part of the audience or interfere with the movie projection system. Spitz created a servo-controlled "starball" that became the centerpiece of the system, dubbed a "Space Transit Simulator" (STS). The spherical star projector and a number of independent planet projectors maintained a low profile while projecting a realistic sky for the astronomy presentations. These elements, along with a number of slide projectors and lighting systems, were all controlled by a PDP-15 minicomputer.

Unlike conventional planetariums, which are limited to showing the night sky as it appears from various points on the surface of the Earth at various dates, the STS could show the sky as it would appear from anywhere within about 100 astronomical units of Earth (about three times the radius of Pluto's orbit). A joystick even allowed the operator to "fly" the theater through space, showing the resulting apparent movement of planets through the sky, though in practice the planetarium presentations were always pre-programmed.

==== First IMAX Dome theater ====
The Fleet is also home to the world's first IMAX Dome Theater, presenting the biggest films on the planet. In addition to planetarium shows, the museum's founders wanted to use a large-format film projection system to show movies on the dome's interior. The San Diego Hall of Science approached IMAX to adapt their large-screen format, but the existing IMAX system was not designed for filling a hemispherical screen.

The system adopted was a modification of IMAX's 65mm format and was named OMNIMAX. The cameras would use a fisheye lens, taking in nearly a 180 degree field of view but with a highly distorted image on the film. When projected on the dome through another fisheye lens, the distortion would be reversed, and the original panoramic view would be recreated. The audience would have a view that was like being at the original scene, occupying nearly the entire field of vision. (IMAX has since renamed this system "IMAX Dome", but some dome theaters retain the old name.)

The theater opened in 1973 as the Reuben H. Fleet Space Theater and Science Center showing two features, Voyage to the Outer Planets ( a combined planetarium show and OMNIMAX film produced by Graphic Films) and the OMNIMAX film Garden Isle (by Roger Tilton Films) on a double bill.

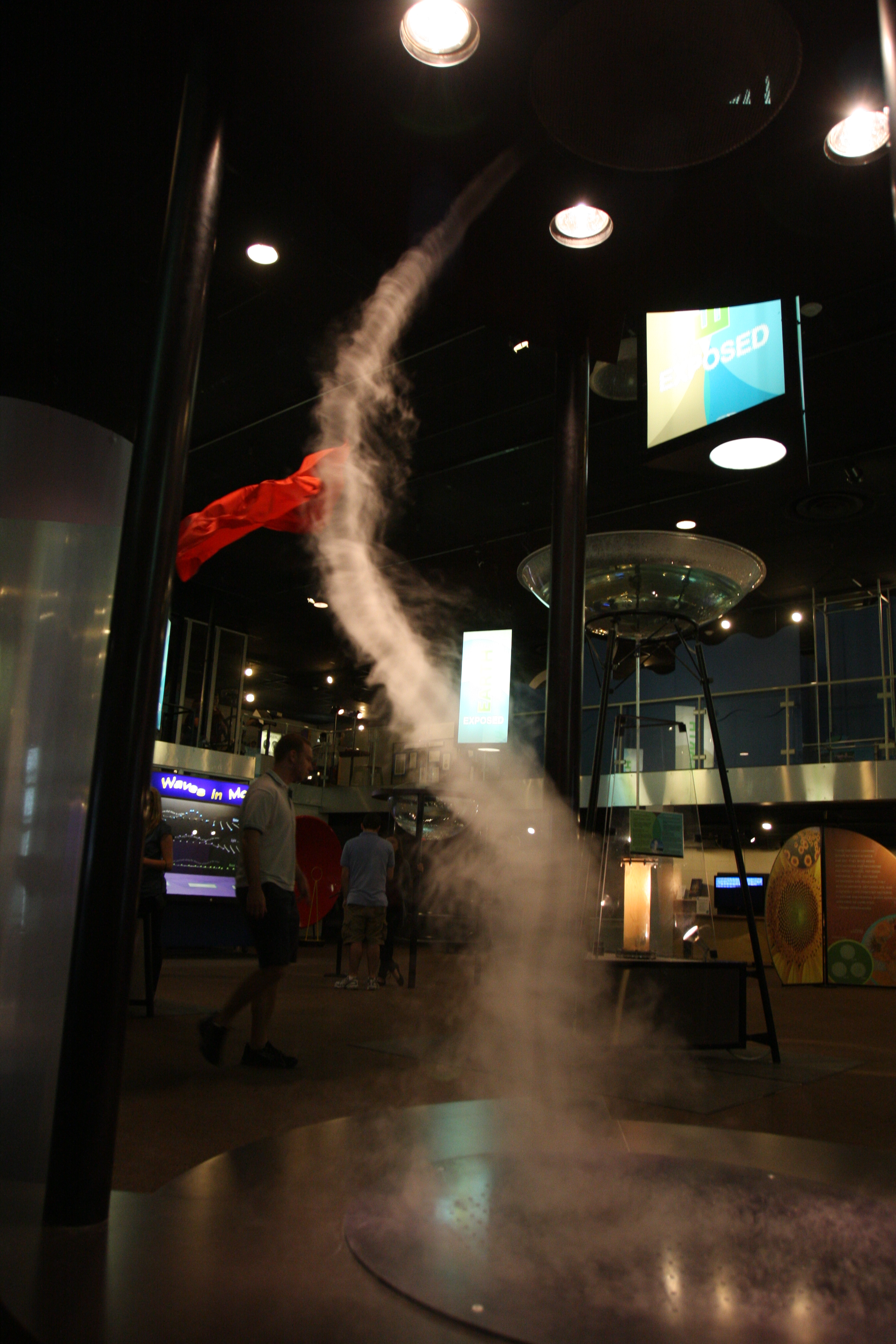
Interactive tornado exhibit in the museum.

=== Science center ===
In addition to setting a new standard for planetariums, the science center was a pioneer in modern science museums. Following the example set four years earlier by the Exploratorium in San Francisco, all exhibits in the science center were required to have something for visitors to manipulate or otherwise participate in. The combination of a planetarium, IMAX Dome theater and interactive science exhibits is now a common thread with most major science museums.

=== Later developments ===
By the late 1990s the science center had become small and outdated compared to newer science museums. In 1998 the science center was expanded (into space freed by moving the offices and construction shops to another site) and modernized to include rides such as the Virtual Zone, a motion-simulator offering virtual rides with a scientific bent. The scientific and interactive exhibits then dwarfed the planetarium/theater, so the name was changed to the Reuben H. Fleet Science Center and re-branded in late 2016 as the Fleet Science Center.

The STS was used for many years but was replaced by an Evans and Sutherland Digistar II in 2001. The facility has been cited as a leading example of energy efficiency and sustainability.

==== Heikoff Dome Theater ====
In 2012 the theater was renamed the Eugene Heikoff and Marilyn Jacobs Heikoff Dome Theater, after receiving a large grant from the Irwin Jacobs family for a major renovation. The planetarium projection system was improved again, and currently uses two Global Immersion GSX systems, each containing two Sony SRX 420 4K video projectors.

The renovation include improving the dome's screen with the world's first NanoSeam Dome screen in an IMAX Theater. This system is used for both live planetarium presentations and digital movies. IMAX Dome movies are still shown using the original film projector and fisheye lens.

At the same time, in-house production of various scientific topics began using video software designed for the dome screen.

In 2021, the Fleet Science Center received a $1,200 grant from Pfizer to support programming on COVID-19 vaccines.

== Museum features ==
All of the Fleet Science Center's exhibits, galleries, and a Heikoff Dome Theater show are included in a daily admission ticket. Features include more than 100 interactive science exhibits in 8 galleries, traveling exhibitions, Kid City (especially for kids five and under), Studio X (interactive create and invent place), the North Star Science Store, Craveology cafe, and the Giant Dome Theater.

"Residents' Free Day" for San Diego County residents is the first Tuesday of each month. Other museums and attractions in Balboa Park offer Residents Free Days on different days each month.

=== Exhibits ===
It has a program for both Visiting Exhibitions and Permanent Exhibitions in the galleries.

Permanent exhibits in the Science Center include Design Zone; Illusions; It's Electric; Kid City; Nano; Power Play San Diego; Pulseworks VR Transporter; San Diego's Water; So Watt!; Space Gallery; Studio X; Sun, Earth, Universe.

Recent temporary exhibitions include "The Art of the Brick, The World's Largest Display of LEGO Art Made Out of Millions of LEGO Bricks", "Taping Shape, Explore an Unexpected Indoor Landscape", and "Science Fiction, Science Future" .

=== Theater shows ===
The Heikoff Dome Theater usually features three IMAX films at one time; current films shown are Deep Sky, Sea Otters: A Wild Family Adventure, and Lost Wolves of Yellowstone. There are also occasional one-time digital shows including both science-oriented productions and music-and-light shows.

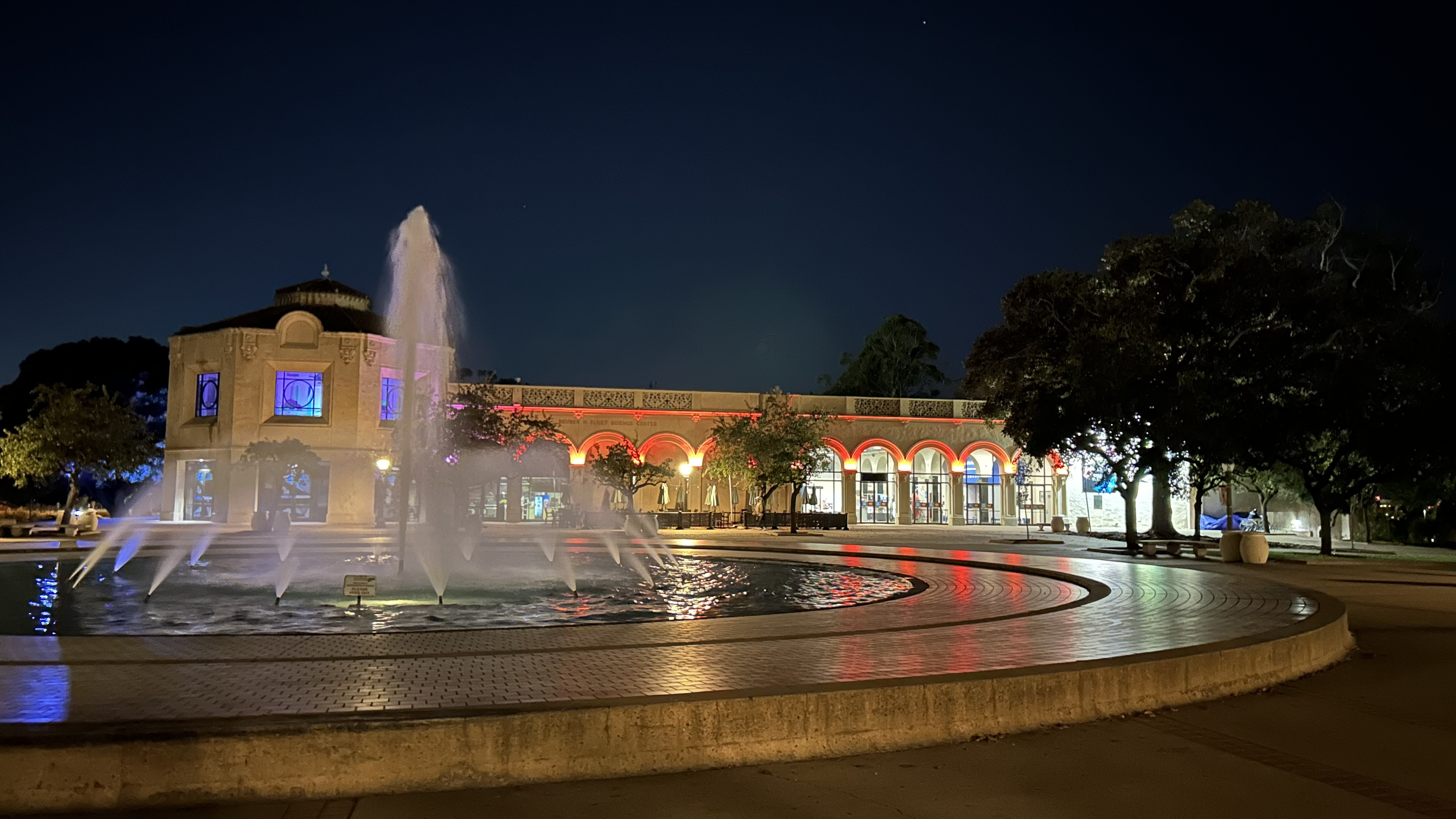
Fleet Science Center

The planetarium show is normally held the first Wednesday of every month. Called "The Sky Tonight" and hosted by the Fleet's astronomer-in-residence, it focuses on the current appearance of the sky or on current topics in astronomy. It is followed by free outdoor telescope viewing courtesy of the San Diego Astronomy Association.
